= Alla Nazimova =

Russian-American actress (1879–1945)

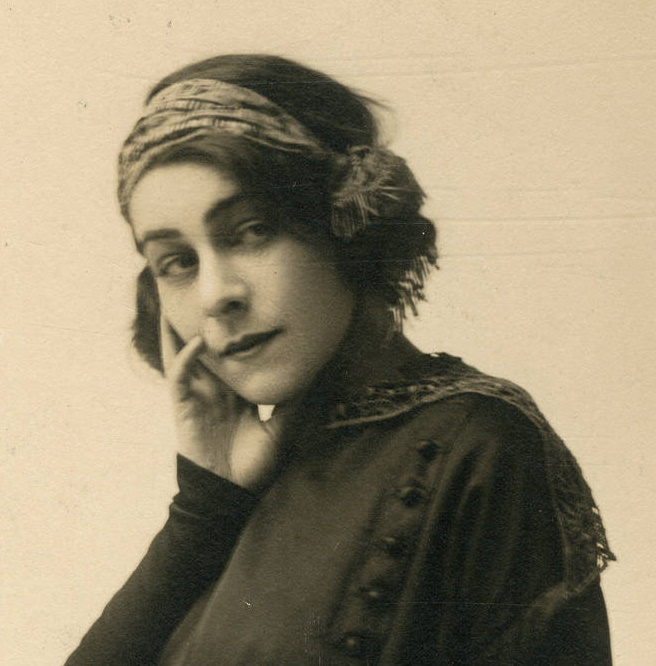
- Nazimova in 1913
- Born: Marem-Ides Leventon (Russian name: Алла Александровна Назимова or Adelaida Yakovlevna Leventon); June 3, 1879 [O.S. May 22] Yalta, Taurida Governorate, Russian Empire
- Died: July 13, 1945 (aged 66); Los Angeles, California, U.S.
- Other names: Nazimova; Alia Nasimoff
- Occupations: Actress; producer; screenwriter
- Years active: 1903–1944
- Known for: Salomé; Ghosts
- Spouse: Sergei Golovin (m. 1899; div. 1923)
- Partner(s): Charles Bryant (1912–1925); Glesca Marshall (1929–1945)
- Relatives: Val Lewton (nephew)
- Website: allanazimova.com

Alla Aleksandrovna Nazimova (Russian: Алла Александровна Назимова; born Marem-Ides Leventon; 3 June [O.S. 22 May] 1879 – July 13, 1945) was a Russian-born American actress. Hailed by modern scholars as the "founding mother of Sapphic Hollywood", Nazimova was a celebrated nonconformist artist who appeared in more than 20 films. She is widely regarded as one of the most influential figures of early 20th-century theater and silent cinema.

Trained at the Moscow Art Theatre under Konstantin Stanislavski, Nazimova rose to international fame for her intense, psychologically driven performances and for introducing modern acting techniques to American audiences. On Broadway, she was noted for her work in the classic plays of Ibsen, Chekhov and Turgenev. After achieving major success on Broadway in the 1910s, Nazimova became one of the highest-paid actresses in the United States and transitioned to silent films, where she exercised an unusual degree of creative control. Through her independent production company, she produced and starred in visually experimental adaptations of literary classics, including Camille (1921), A Doll's House (1922), and Salomé (1923).

Although many of her most daring films were commercial failures at the time of release, Nazimova's work has since been reassessed as groundbreaking for its embrace of avant-garde design, feminist themes, and early expressions of queer identity. Openly bisexual within Hollywood's private social circles, she was a central figure in early LGBTQ cultural history. She also created the Garden of Alla Hotel which became a retreat for many celebrities of the time. Nazimova's legacy endures as one of the most influential figures of early 20th-century theater and silent cinema.

== Early life ==
Nazimova was born Marem-Ides Leventon (Russian name: Adelaida Yakovlevna Leventon) in the resort town of Yalta, in Crimea, Russian Empire. Her accepted birth year is 1879, but other sources have mentioned 1876 as a possible birth year. Her stage name Alla Nazimova was a combination of Alla (a diminutive of Adelaida) and the surname of Nadezhda Nazimova, the heroine of the Russian novel Children of the Streets. She was widely known as just Nazimova. Her name was sometimes transcribed as Alia Nasimoff. The youngest of three children born to Jewish parents Yakov Abramovich Leventon, a pharmacist, and Sarah Leivievna Gorowitz (later known as Sofia or Sophie Lvovna Gorovitz/Horovitz/Herowitz), who moved to Yalta in 1870 from Kishinev, Nazimova grew up in a dysfunctional family. After her parents divorced when she was eight, she was shuffled among boarding schools, foster homes and relatives.

As a teenager, she began to pursue an interest in the theatre and took acting lessons at the Academy of Acting in Moscow. She joined Constantin Stanislavski's Moscow Art Theatre using the name of Alla Nazimova for the first time. She studied with Vladimir Nemirovich-Danchenko, co-founder of the Moscow Art Theater.

== Career ==
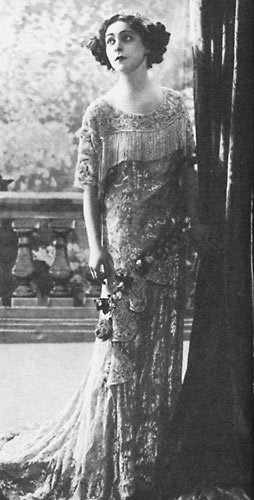
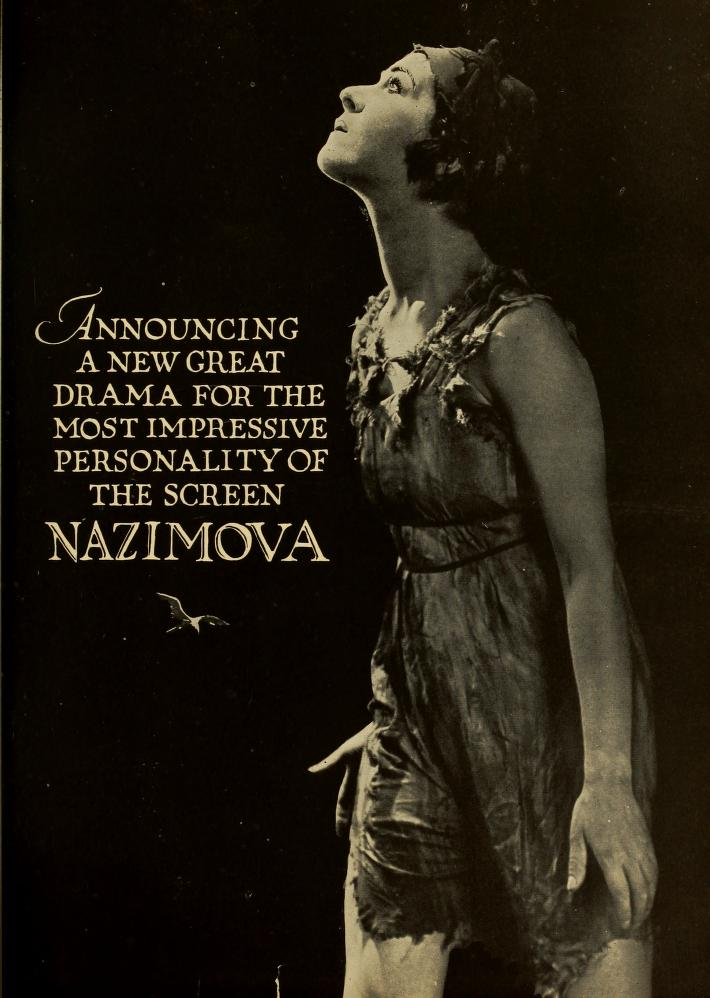
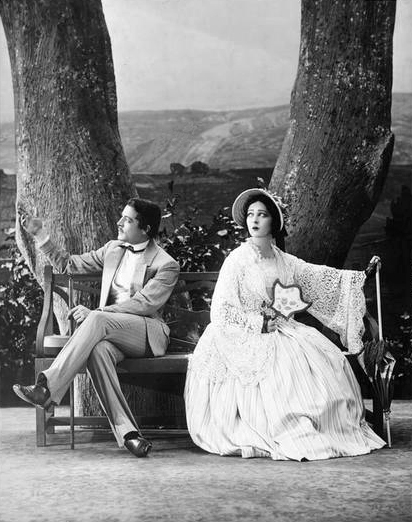
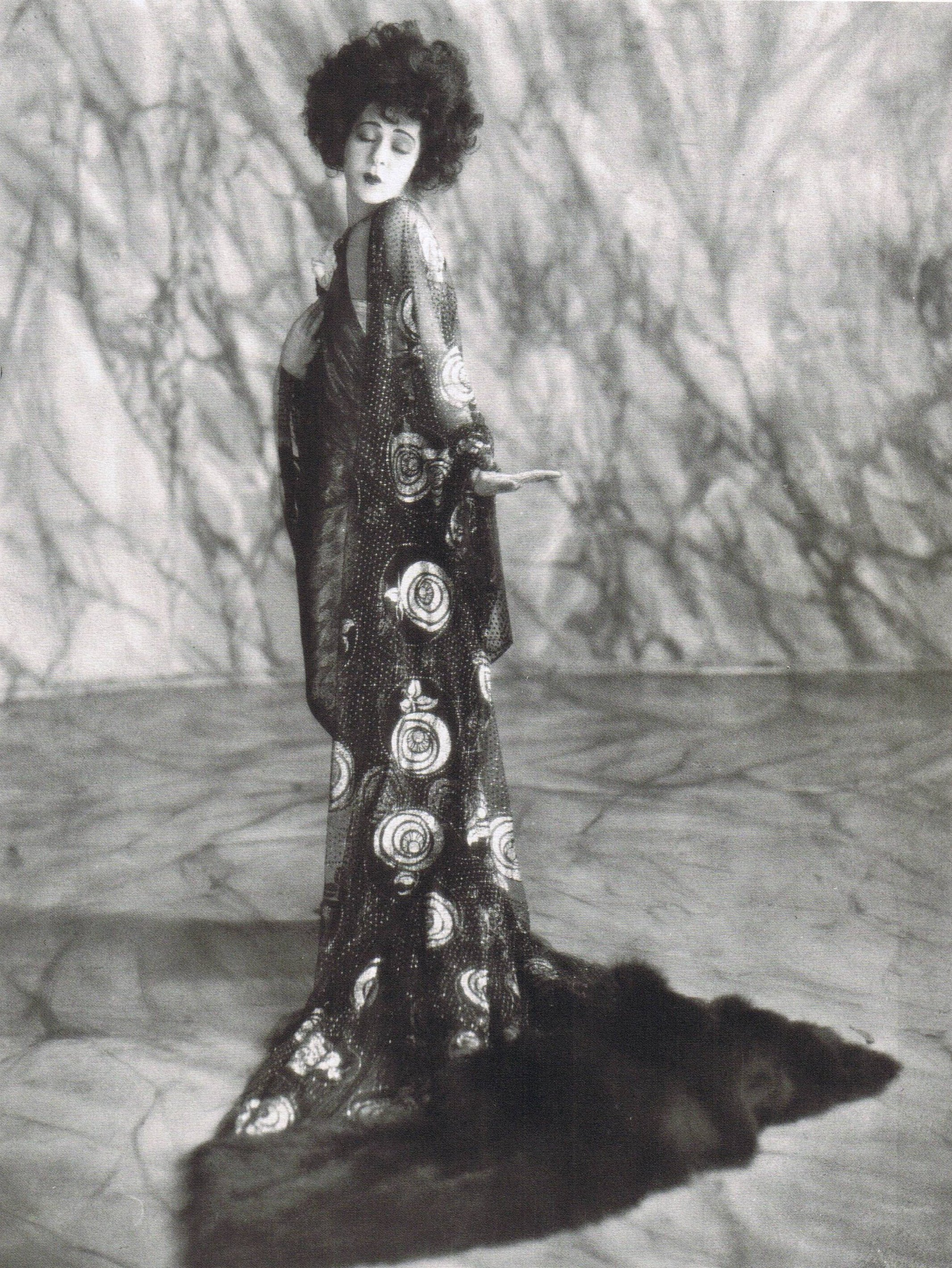
Alla Nazimova. Clockwise from upper left: in the 1911 Broadway play The Marionettes, in an ad for a film, as Marguerite Gautier in Camille, and with Elliot Cabot in A Month in the Country (1930).

Nazimova's theater career blossomed early, and by 1903, she was a major star in Moscow and Saint Petersburg. She toured Europe, including London and Berlin, with her boyfriend Pavel Orlenev, a flamboyant actor and producer. In 1905, they moved to New York City and founded a Russian-language theater on the Lower East Side. The venture was unsuccessful, and Orlenev returned to Russia while Nazimova stayed in New York.

She was signed by the American producer Henry Miller and made her Broadway debut in New York City in 1906 to critical and popular success. Her English-language premiere in November 1906 was in the title role of Hedda Gabler. She reportedly learned English in five months. She quickly became extremely popular (Nazimova's 39th Street Theatre was named after her) and remained a major Broadway star, often starring in works by Ibsen and Chekhov. Dorothy Parker described her as the finest Hedda Gabler she had ever seen.

Nazimova's film career began when she was 37 years old. Due to her notoriety in a 35-minute 1915 play entitled War Brides, Nazimova made her silent film debut in 1916 in the filmed version of the play, which was produced by Lewis J. Selznick. She was paid $1,000 per day, and the film was a success. A young actor with a bit part in the movie was Richard Barthelmess, whose mother, Caroline W. Harris, had taught Nazimova English. Nazimova had encouraged him to try out for movies and he later became a star.

In 1917, she negotiated a contract with Metro Pictures, a precursor to MGM, that included a weekly salary of $13,000. She moved from New York to Hollywood, where she made a number of highly successful films for Metro that earned her considerable money.

She created and worked under Nazimova Productions from 1917 to 1921. She filled many roles in film production, outside of acting. She served as a director, producer, editor, and lighting designer, and received credit for costume design for the 1918 film Revelation. She collaborated closely with designer Natacha Rambova to create a distinctive modernist aesthetic marked by stylized sets, symbolic costuming, and fantasy staging.

Nazimova wrote screenplays under the pseudonym Peter M. Winters. She directed films credited to the name of her partner Charles Bryant. In her film adaptations of works by such notable writers as Oscar Wilde and Ibsen, she developed filmmaking techniques that were considered daring at the time. Her film projects, including A Doll's House (1922), based on Ibsen, and Salomé (1923), based on Wilde's play, were critical and commercial failures. Salomé, however, has become a cult classic, regarded as a feminist milestone in film. In 2000, the film was added to the National Film Registry. By 1925, she could no longer afford to invest in more films, and financial backers withdrew their support.

In 1927, she became a naturalized citizen of the United States. Left with few options in Hollywood, she returned to New York to perform on Broadway, notably starring as Natalya Petrovna in Rouben Mamoulian's 1930 New York production of Turgenev's A Month in the Country and having an acclaimed performance as Mrs. Alving in Ibsen's Ghosts. Critic Pauline Kael described this as the greatest performance she had ever seen on the American stage.

In the early 1940s, Nazimova returned to films, playing Robert Taylor's mother in Escape (1940) and Tyrone Power's mother in Blood and Sand (1941). This late return to motion pictures fortunately preserves Nazimova and her art on sound film.

== Personal life ==
=== Marriages ===
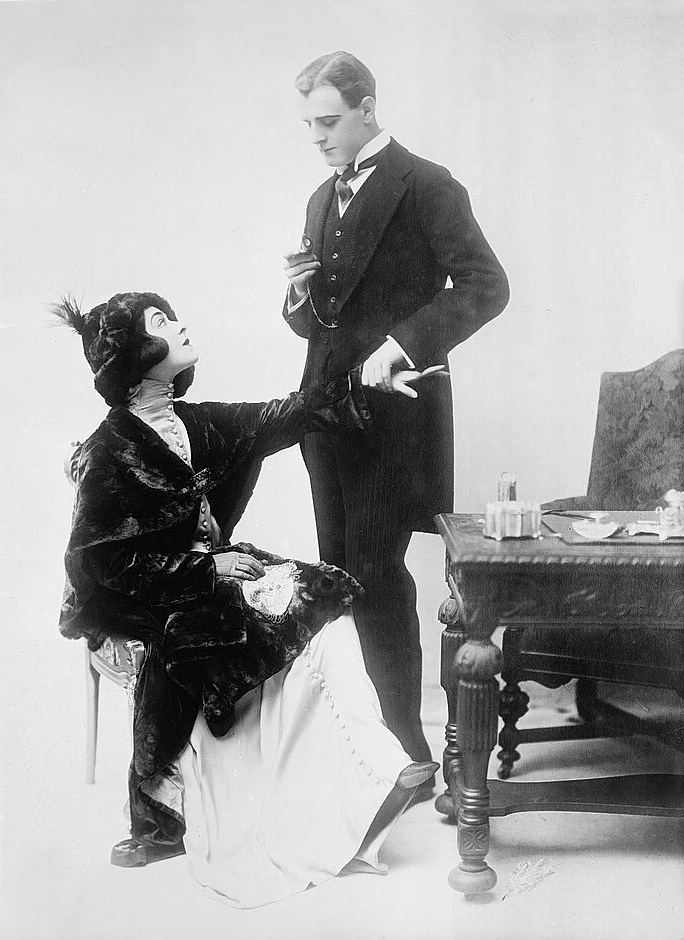
Nazimova and actor Charles Bryant in 1912

In 1899, she married Sergei Golovin, a fellow actor. From 1912 to 1925, Nazimova maintained a lavender marriage with Charles Bryant (1879–1948), a British-born actor. To bolster this arrangement with Bryant, Nazimova kept her marriage to Golovin secret from the press, her fans, and even her friends. In 1923, she arranged to divorce Golovin without traveling to the Soviet Union. Her divorce papers, which arrived in the United States that summer, stated that on May 11, 1923, the marriage of "citizeness Leventon Alla Alexandrovna" and Sergius Arkadyevitch Golovin, "consummated between them in the City Church of Boruysk June 20, 1899", had been officially dissolved. A little over two years later, on November 16, 1925, Charles Bryant, then 43, surprised the press, Nazimova's fans, and Nazimova herself by marrying Marjorie Gilhooley, 23, in Connecticut. When the press uncovered the fact that Charles had listed his current marital status as "single" on his marriage license, the revelation that the marriage between Alla and Charles had been a sham from the beginning embroiled Nazimova in a scandal that damaged her career.

=== Relationships with women ===
From 1917 to 1922, Nazimova wielded considerable influence and power in Hollywood. She helped start the careers of both of Rudolph Valentino's wives, Jean Acker and Natacha Rambova. Although she was involved in an affair with Acker, it is debatable as to whether her connection with Rambova ever developed into a sexual affair. Nevertheless, there were rumors that Nazimova and Rambova were involved in a lesbian affair, but those rumors have never been confirmed. Nazimova lived together with Glesca Marshall from 1929 until Nazimova's death in 1945.

The list of those Nazimova is confirmed to have been romantically involved with includes actress Eva Le Gallienne, film director Dorothy Arzner, writer Mercedes de Acosta, and Oscar Wilde's niece Dolly Wilde. Bridget Bate Tichenor, a Magic Realist artist and Surrealist painter, was rumored to be one of Nazimova's favored lovers in Hollywood during 1940–1942. The two had been introduced by the poet and art collector Edward James, and according to Tichenor, their intimate relationship angered Nazimova's longtime companion Glesca Marshall. Nazimova also had an affair with French cameraman Paul Ivano, who admitted that "Alla preferred women most of the time."

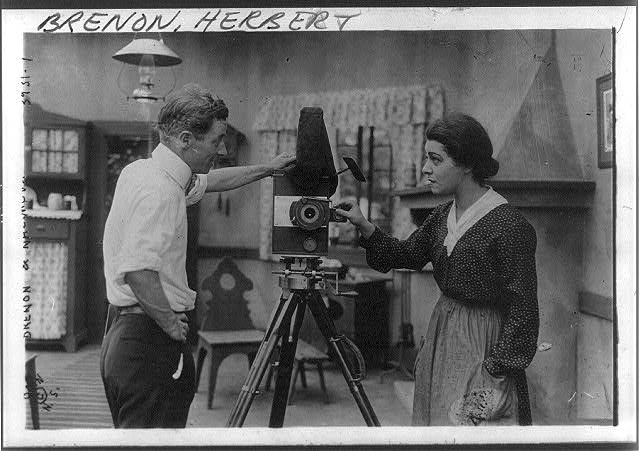
Nazimova with Herbert Brenon, 1916

It is believed that Nazimova coined the phrase "sewing circle" as code to refer to lesbian or bisexual actresses of her day who concealed their true sexuality.

=== Friends and relations ===
Edith Luckett, a stage actress and the mother of future U.S. First Lady Nancy Reagan, was a friend of Nazimova, having acted with her onstage. Edith married Kenneth Seymour Robbins, and following the birth of their daughter Nancy in 1921, Nazimova became her godmother. Nazimova continued to be friends with Edith and her second husband, neurosurgeon Loyal Davis, until her death. She was also the aunt of American film producer Val Lewton.

=== Garden of Alla ===
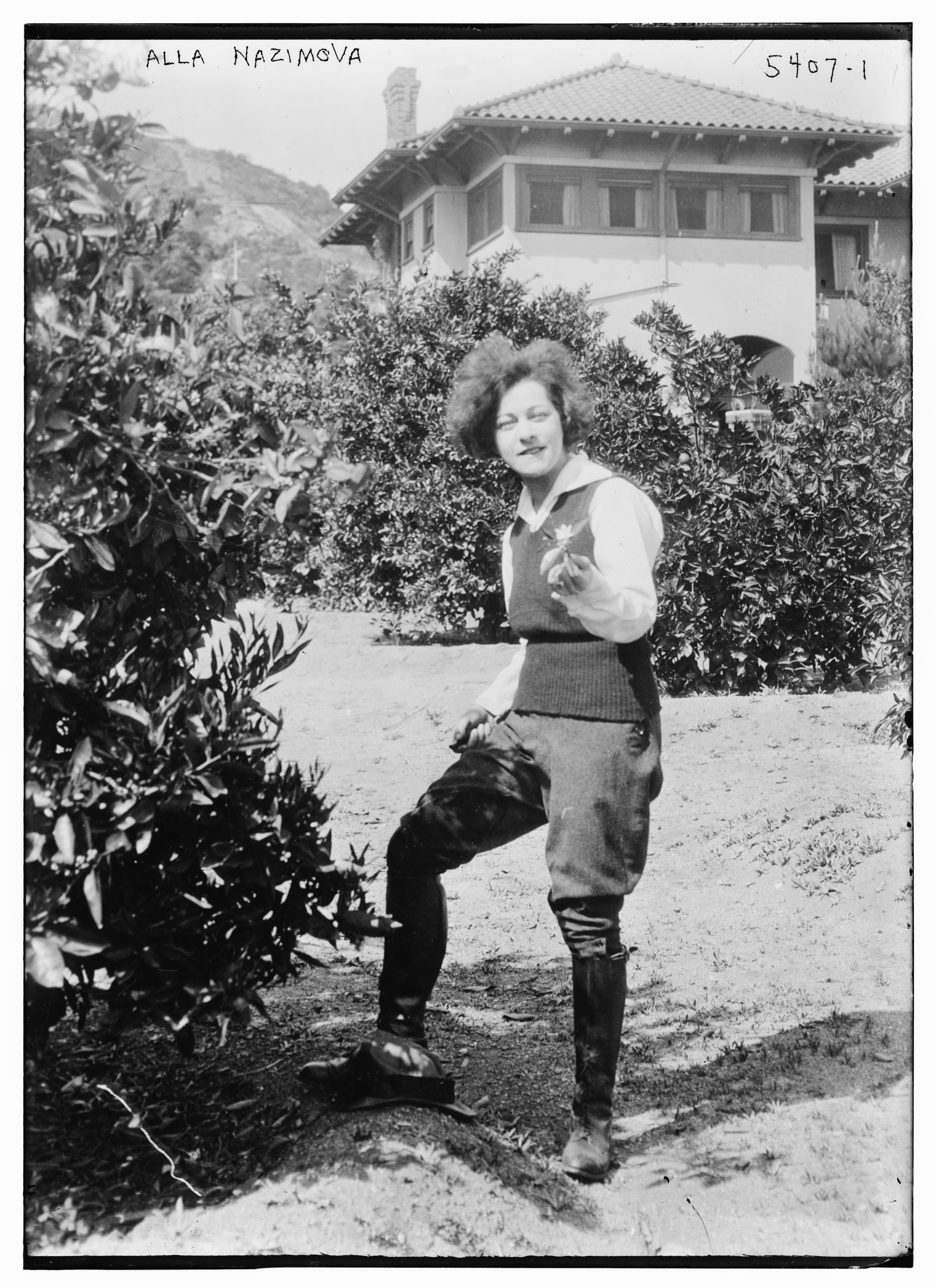
Nazimova on the grounds of the Garden of Alla

Nazimova's private lifestyle gave rise to widespread rumors of outlandish and allegedly debauched parties at her mansion on Sunset Boulevard in Hollywood, California, known as The Garden of Alla, which she leased in 1918 and bought outright the next year. Facing near-bankruptcy in 1926, she converted the 2.5-acre estate into a hotel by building 25 villas on the property. The Garden of Alla Hotel opened in January 1927. But Nazimova was ill-equipped to run a hotel and eventually sold it and returned to Broadway and theatrical tours. By 1930, the hotel had been purchased by Central Holding Corporation, which changed the name to the Garden of Allah Hotel. When Nazimova moved back to Hollywood in 1938, she rented Villa 24 at the hotel and lived there until her death.

== Death and memorials ==
On July 13, 1945, Nazimova died of a coronary thrombosis, at age 66, in the Good Samaritan Hospital in Los Angeles. Her ashes were interred in Forest Lawn Memorial Park Cemetery in Glendale, California.

== Legacy ==
Her contributions to the film industry have been recognized with a star on the Hollywood Walk of Fame.

Nazimova has been depicted a number of times in film and onstage. The first two were biographical films about Rudolph Valentino: The Legend of Valentino (1975), in which she was portrayed by Alicia Bond; and Valentino (1977), in which she was portrayed by Leslie Caron. She was featured in two 2013 silent films about Hollywood's silent movie era: Return to Babylon, in which she was played by Laura Harring, and Silent Life, based on the life of Rudolph Valentino, where she was played by Sherilyn Fenn.

The character of Nazimova also appears in Dominick Argento's opera Dream of Valentino, in which she also played the violin. Nazimova was also featured in make-up artist Kevyn Aucoin's 2004 book Face Forward, in which he made up Isabella Rossellini to resemble her, particularly as posed in a certain photograph.

Actress Romy Nordlinger first portrayed Alla Nazimova in The Society for the Preservation of Theatrical History production of Stage Struck: From Kemble to Kate staged at the Snapple Theater Center in New York City in December 2013. In Fall 2016, PLACES, a multimedia solo show about Alla Nazimova, supported by the League of Professional Theatre Women's Heritage Program, written and performed by Romy Nordlinger debuted at Playhouse Theatre for a limited run.

The Garden of Allah cabaret was an influential LGBTQ+ cabaret venue in the mid-20th century that took its name and inspiration from Nazimova's original Garden of Alla.

Nazimova also appears in Medusa's Web, a novel by fantasy-fiction writer Tim Powers.

== Filmography ==
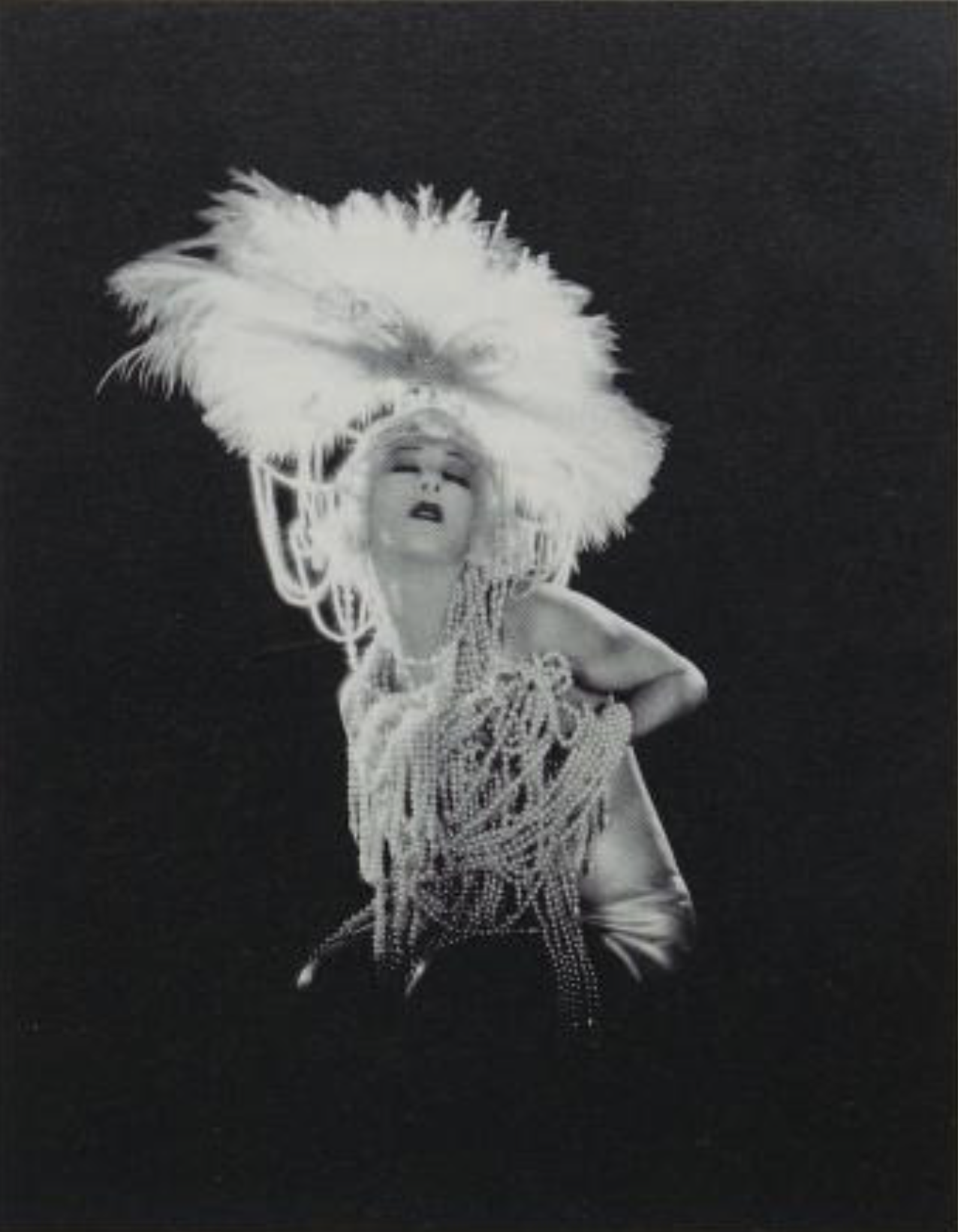
Alla Nazimova in Salomé.

Year	Film	Role	Notes
1916	War Brides	Joan	Lost film
1918	Revelation	Joline	
1918	Toys of Fate	Zorah/Hagah	
1918	A Woman of France		
1918	Eye for Eye	Hassouna	Lost film Also producer and co-director
1919	Out of the Fog	Faith & Eve	Lost film
1919	The Red Lantern	Mahlee & Blanche Sackville	Available to watch on YouTube
1919	The Brat	The Brat	Also producer and writer Lost film
1920	Stronger Than Death	Sigrid Fersen	Also producer
1920	The Heart of a Child	Sally Snape	Also producer Lost film
1920	Madame Peacock	Jane Gloring/Gloria Cromwell	Also producer and writer (adaptation)
1920	Billions	Princess Triloff	Also writer (titles) and editor Lost film
1921	Camille	Marguerite Gautier/Manon Lescaut in Daydream	Available to watch on YouTube
1922	A Doll's House	Nora Helmer	Also producer and writer Lost film
1922	Salomé	Salomé	Also producer, writer and co-director Available to watch on YouTube
1924	Madonna of the Streets	Mary Carlson/Mary Ainsleigh	Lost film
1925	The Redeeming Sin	Joan	Lost film
1925	My Son	Ana Silva	Lost film
1940	Escape	Emmy Ritter	
1941	Blood and Sand	Señora Angustias Gallardo	
1944	In Our Time	Zofya Orvid	
1944	The Bridge of San Luis Rey	Doña Maria – The Marquesa	
1944	Since You Went Away	Zofia Koslowska	

== See also ==
- List of American film actresses
- List of film producers
- List of Jewish actors
- List of people from California
- List of people from New York City
- List of people from Ukraine
- List of Russian people
- List of women writers

== Sources ==
- Robinson, Harlow (2007). Russians in Hollywood, Hollywood's Russians: Biography of an Image. UPNE. ISBN 978-1-55553-686-2.
