= Breast contouring =

Breast contouring may refer to:

- making breasts appear more prominent through makeup, see contouring
- medical procedures that reshape breasts, see body contouring
