= Out of the Fog (1919 film) =

1919 film by Albert Capellani

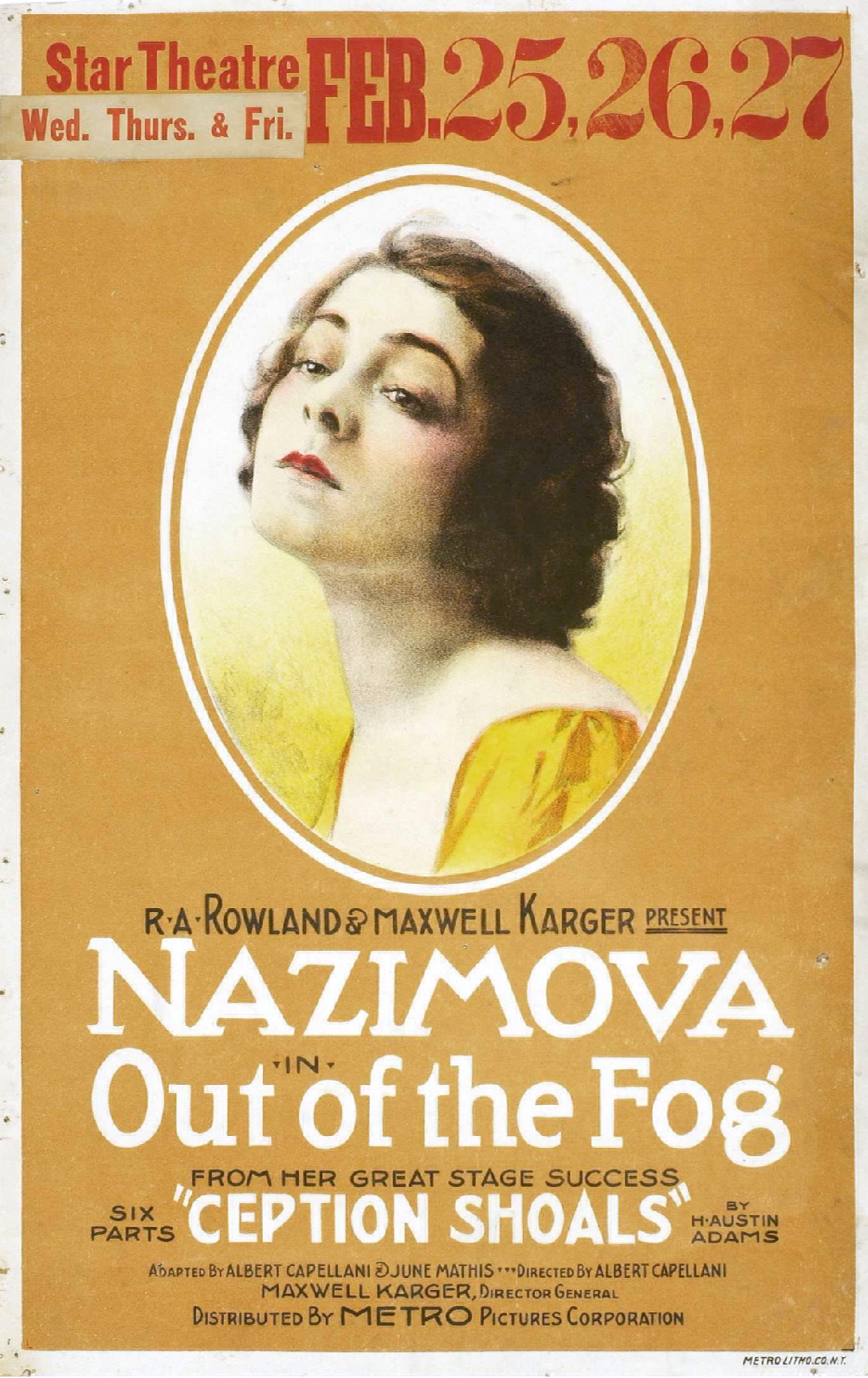
- Film poster
- Directed by: Albert Capellani
- Written by: June Mathis
- Based on: Ception Shoals; 1917 play by H. Austin Adams
- Produced by: Richard A. Rowland; Maxwell Karger
- Starring: Alla Nazimova
- Cinematography: Eugene Gaudio; Eugene Morin
- Production company: Nazimova Productions
- Distributed by: Metro Pictures
- Release date: February 8, 1919
- Running time: 7 reels
- Country: USA
- Language: Silent.. English titles

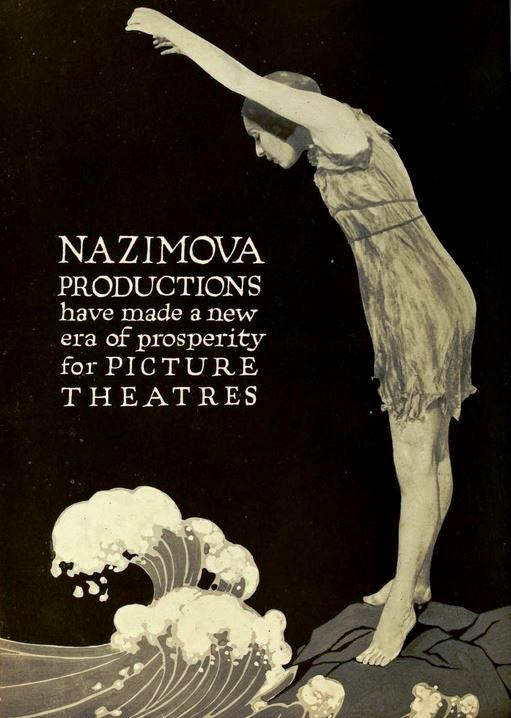
trade image.

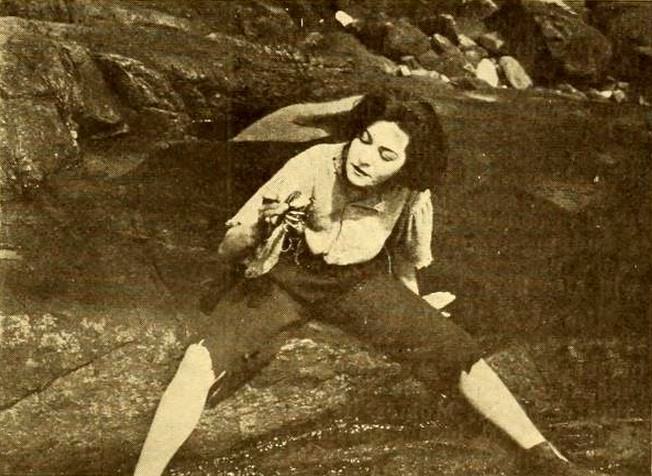
scene from the film.

Out of the Fog is a lost 1919 silent film drama directed by Albert Capellani and starring Alla Nazimova billed as Madame Nazimova. It was produced by Nazimova, Richard A. Rowland and Maxwell Karger with distribution through Metro Pictures.

The project originated from Nazimova's desire to adapt the play Ception Shoals, where she could revive her youthful image - as a 16-year-old girl in a bathing suit - something she had previously explored in Toys of Fate. June Mathis, known for her melodramatic screenplays and bold themes, structured the film with a prologue that allowed Nazimova to play dual roles: mother and daughter, thereby deepening the theme of female oppression under fanatical religious patriarchy.

== Plot summary ==
The story begins with Faith, the sister of a puritanical lighthouse keeper, who is seduced, impregnated, and abandoned by a sailor. After giving birth to her daughter, Eve, Faith endures a brutal reprimand from her brother, who condemns her for the "mortal sin". In despair, she throws herself from the lighthouse during a storm. The narrative then jumps forward 16 years, showing Eve emerging from the same ocean that claimed her mother, suggesting a cyclical repetition of suffering. Mathis added a disturbing layer by hinting at the lighthouse keeper’s incestuous fixation on his sister—a bold element for the time.

== Cast ==
- Alla Nazimova - Faith & Eve
- Charles Bryant - Philip Blake
- Henry Harmon - Job Coffin
- Nancy Palmer - Maude Standish
- T. Morse Koupal - Luke Allen
- George Davis - Brad Standish
- Charles Smiley - Elijah Allen
- Tom Blake - Jim Smooth
- Hugh Jeffrey - Constable
- Dorothy Smoller - Dancer
- Marie Grant - Fisher Folk
- Ada Scovill - Fisher Folk
- J. O'Connor - Fisher Folk
- Amelia Burleson - Fisher Folk
- Harry Wise - Fisher Folk

== Critical reception ==
Released in New York on February 9, 1919, the film received mixed reviews. The New York Times praised Nazimova's "strength and subtlety" in both roles, noting that despite being 40 years old, she managed to make the teenage daughter as convincing as the mother. Capellani's direction was celebrated for its atmospheric work, particularly in the exterior scenes filmed along the Massachusetts coastline, captured by cinematographer Eugene Gaudio. However, some critics found the story overly melodramatic.

In her book Star Attractions: Twentieth-Century Movie Magazines and Global Fandom, Tamar Jeffers McDonald analyzes how critics perceived Nazimova's performance in Out of the Fog. According to McDonald the reviewer from The Moving Picture World described her as "the great Russian artist" who contributed "something big and significant to the art of acting". The author emphasizes how the critical acclaim Nazimova received for her role, while also noting how contemporary media often framed her identity in terms of her perceived "Russian" mystique.
