= Milla Davenport =

American actress

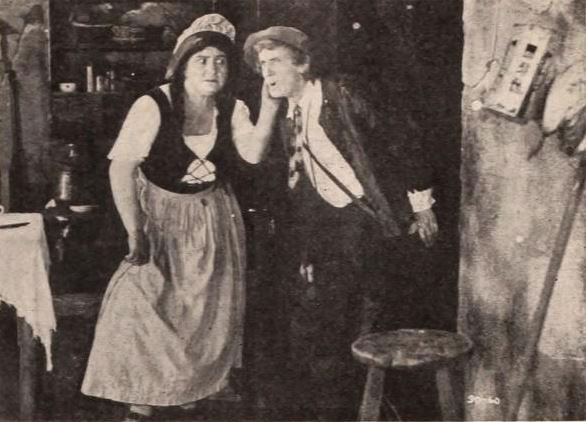
- Davenport and Thomas Jefferson in Rip Van Winkle (1921)
- Born: February 4, 1871; Zurich, Switzerland
- Died: May 17, 1936 (aged 65); Los Angeles, California, US

Milla Davenport (February 4, 1871 in Zurich – May 17, 1936) was an American stage and film actress who first appeared with the repertory company of her husband, actor Harry J. Davenport (1870–1929), for fifteen years.

Davenport then began a career in motion pictures in the silent film Trapping the Bachelor (1916). She was in Daddy-Long-Legs (1919) with Mary Pickford, The Brat (1919) with Nazimova, Sins of the Fathers (1928) with Emil Jannings, and The Wedding Night (1935). Davenport continued to make movies well into the sound film era. Her last film credits are for roles in The Defense Rests (1934), Here Comes Cookie (1935), and an uncredited part in Human Cargo (1936).

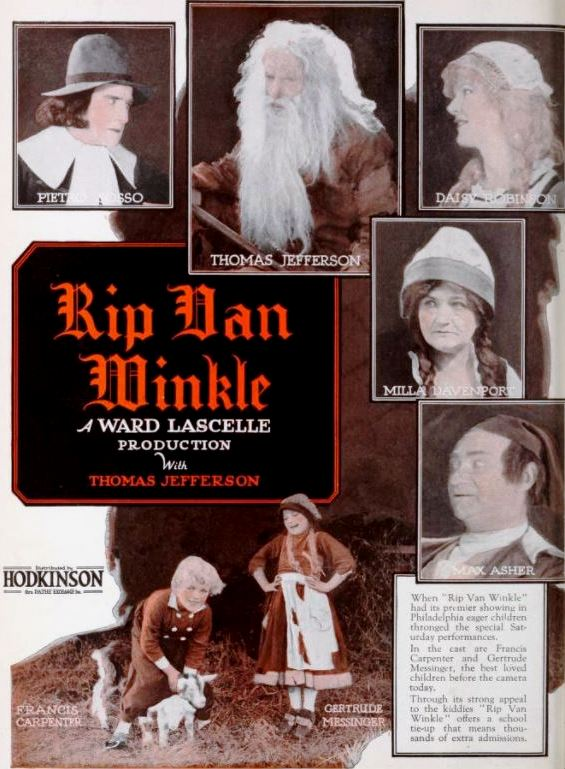
Advertisement for Rip Van Winkle (1921) including an image of Davenport in her role

Davenport died in Los Angeles, California in 1936, aged 65. She was buried in the Hollywood Forever Cemetery.

== Partial filmography ==
- Social Briars (1918)
- Daddy-Long-Legs (1919)
- The Brat (1919)
- In Mizzoura (1919)
- Stronger Than Death (1920)
- The Forbidden Woman (1920)
- You Never Can Tell (1920)
- She Couldn't Help It (1920)
- Rip Van Winkle (1921)
- The Man from Lost River (1921)
- Patsy (1921)
- Why Trust Your Husband? (1921)
- The Worldly Madonna (1922)
- Dulcy (1923)
- Daddies (1924)
- The Right of the Strongest (1924)
- The Red Lily (1924)
- Dangerous Innocence (1925)
- Wild West (1925)
- The Road to Glory (1926)
- Crazy like a Fox (1926)
- Crossed Signals (1926)
- Hey! Hey! Cowboy (1927)
- The Danger Rider (1928)
- Sins of the Fathers (1928)
- The Girl from Woolworth's (1929)
- The Wedding Night (1935)
- Here Comes Cookie (1935)
