= Dorothy Smoller =

American actress

Dorothy Smoller (c.1898 – 9 December 1926) was an actress and dancer known for the 1919 film Out of the Fog. She was also featured on the 1919 US Vogue cover in a photograph taken by photographer Adolph de Meyer.

== Early life and career ==
Early in her career, she was a dancer at the Palace and St. Francis hotels in San Francisco and in 1914 she toured internationally, demonstrating the tango. She then studied dance with Ruth St. Denis. In 1915, she was engaged as a solo dancer at the Panama–Pacific International Exposition, where she "danced a bacchanale with such grace that it created a sensation". She then spent two years as a support dancer with Anna Pavlova during her tour of South America and on her return to New York. In 1919 and 1920, she had dancing roles in several plays and musicals, including See-Saw (produced by Henry W. Savage), What's In a Name (produced by John Murray Anderson), and Checkerboard, and also appeared in operetta in 1921, at the Orpheum Theatre, San Francisco, and on tour. In 1919, she appeared as a dancer in the film Out of the fog, and was featured on the cover of the December 1919 issue of Vogue magazine, photographed by Adolphe de Meyer.

== Illness and death ==
Smoller was diagnosed with severe pulmonary tuberculosis in 1923. She spent two years at the Cragmor Sanitarium in Colorado Springs to seek treatment, where she met Benjamin Strong, who was also suffering from tuberculosis. Against the advice of doctors, she went back to New York to resume her dancing career, but suffered a hemorrhage during rehearsal for the Broadway play "Howdy, King". She committed suicide on December 9, 1926, in her room at the Hotel Shelton, New York City, four days before the play's opening, writing letters addressed to her mother, Mrs Rose Smoller, and to Benjamin Strong. The cause of death was suicide by drinking liquid shoe polish which contained potassium cyanide. A New York newspaper speculated that another factor contributing to her suicide was her "failure to get work in the films .. Miss Smoller had a screen test at the Famous Players studio .. and .. was informed she "would be considered".
