= Rip Van Winkle (1921 film) =

1921 film

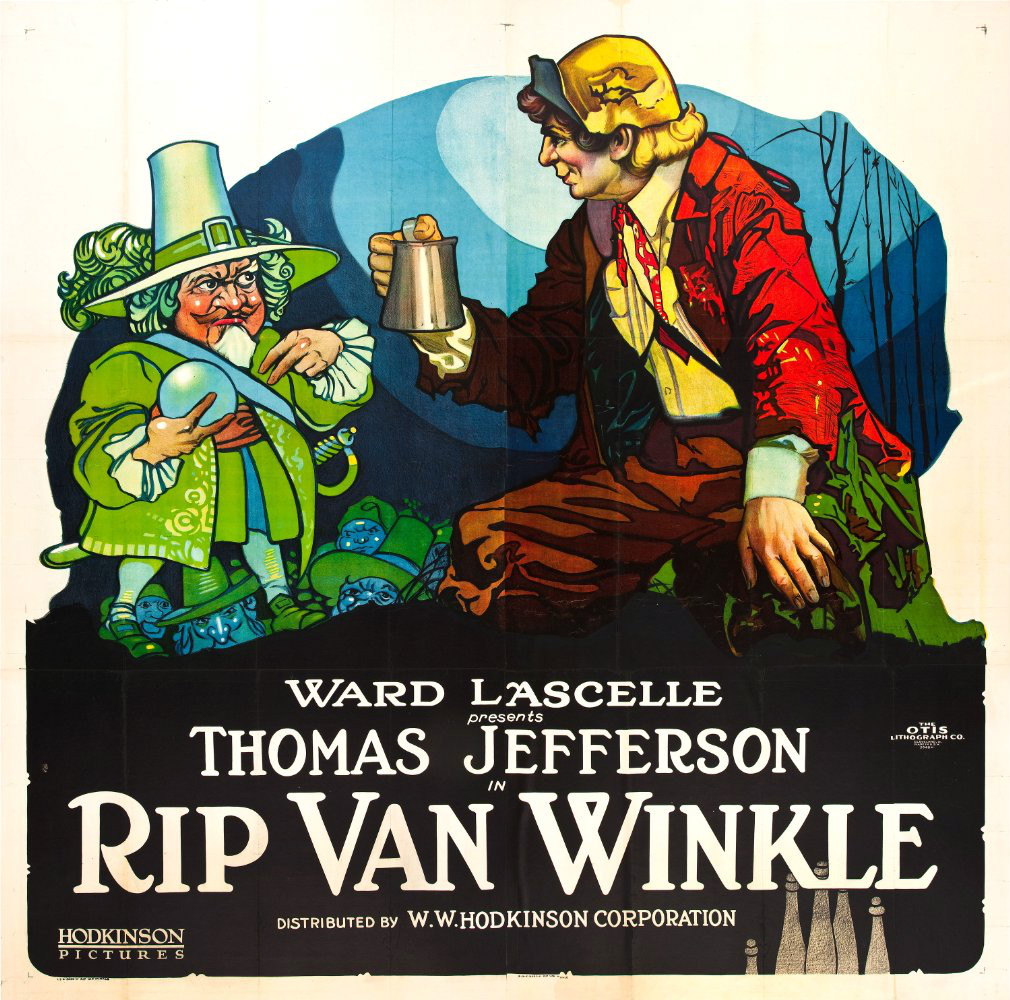
- Lobby poster
- Directed by: Edward Ludwig
- Written by: Edward Ludwig (adaptation); Agnes Parsons (scenario)
- Based on: "Rip Van Winkle" by Washington Irving and "Rip Van Winkle" (play) by Dion Boucicault and Joseph Jefferson
- Produced by: Ward Lascelle Productions
- Starring: Thomas Jefferson; Milla Davenport
- Cinematography: David Abel
- Distributed by: W. W. Hodkinson Corporation
- Release date: October 2, 1921 (USA)
- Running time: 58 minutes
- Country: United States
- Language: Silent (English intertitles)

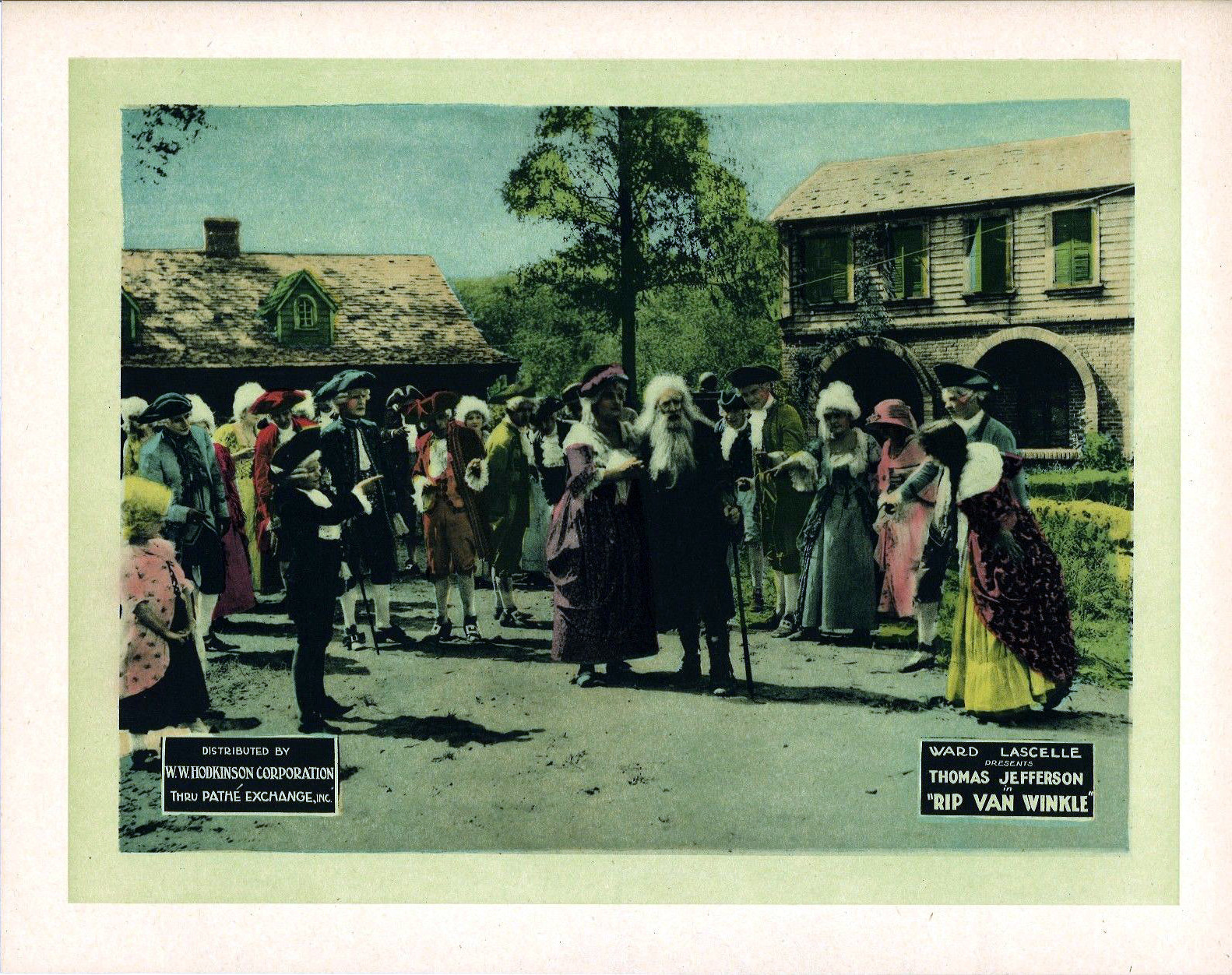
lobby card

Rip Van Winkle is a 1921 American silent fantasy film, directed by Edward Ludwig. Starring Thomas Jefferson and Milla Davenport in the oft-filmed 1819 Washington Irving short story about Rip Van Winkle who falls asleep and wakes up 20 years later. It was made famous in the 19th century as a play by Thomas Jefferson's father, Joseph Jefferson, and Dion Boucicault. T. Jefferson had starred in a 1914 feature-length version of the story, which was re-released in 1921 just as this film was premiering. However, the two should not be confused as the same film, they are two different films starring the same actor.

== Plot ==
As described in a film magazine, after swearing off drinking time and time again and familiarly discounting the next drink after each resolution, Rip Van Winkle (Jefferson) is finally driven out of the house by his wife Gretchen (Davenport).

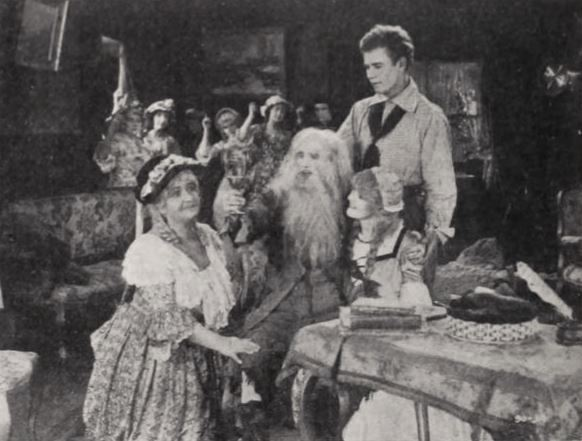
Movie still

On his journey into the hills, he meets a little man from the Catskill Mountains who is carrying a keg. After drinking the strange concoction, Rip's slumber for twenty years follows. When he returns to his village, everything and everyone has changed. His wife has married the unscrupulous Derrick Van Beckman (Sosso), who has designs on the Van Winkle's property. Rip arrives just in time to prevent a forced marriage of his daughter Meenie (Daisy Jefferson) to Derrick's nephew, and reclaims his land. Rip and Gretchen are reunited and she promises him that he can become tipsy as often as he pleases in the future. Meenie marries her childhood sweetheart, who has returned after being believed to have been lost at sea.

== Cast ==
- Thomas Jefferson as Rip Van Winkle
- Milla Davenport as Gretchen Van Winkle
- Daisy Jefferson as Meenie Van Winkle
- Gertrude Messinger as Meenie Van Winkle, as a child
- Pietro Sosso as Derrick Van Beckman
- Max Asher as Nick Vedder
- Francis Carpenter as Hendrick Vedder
