= Revelation (1918 film) =

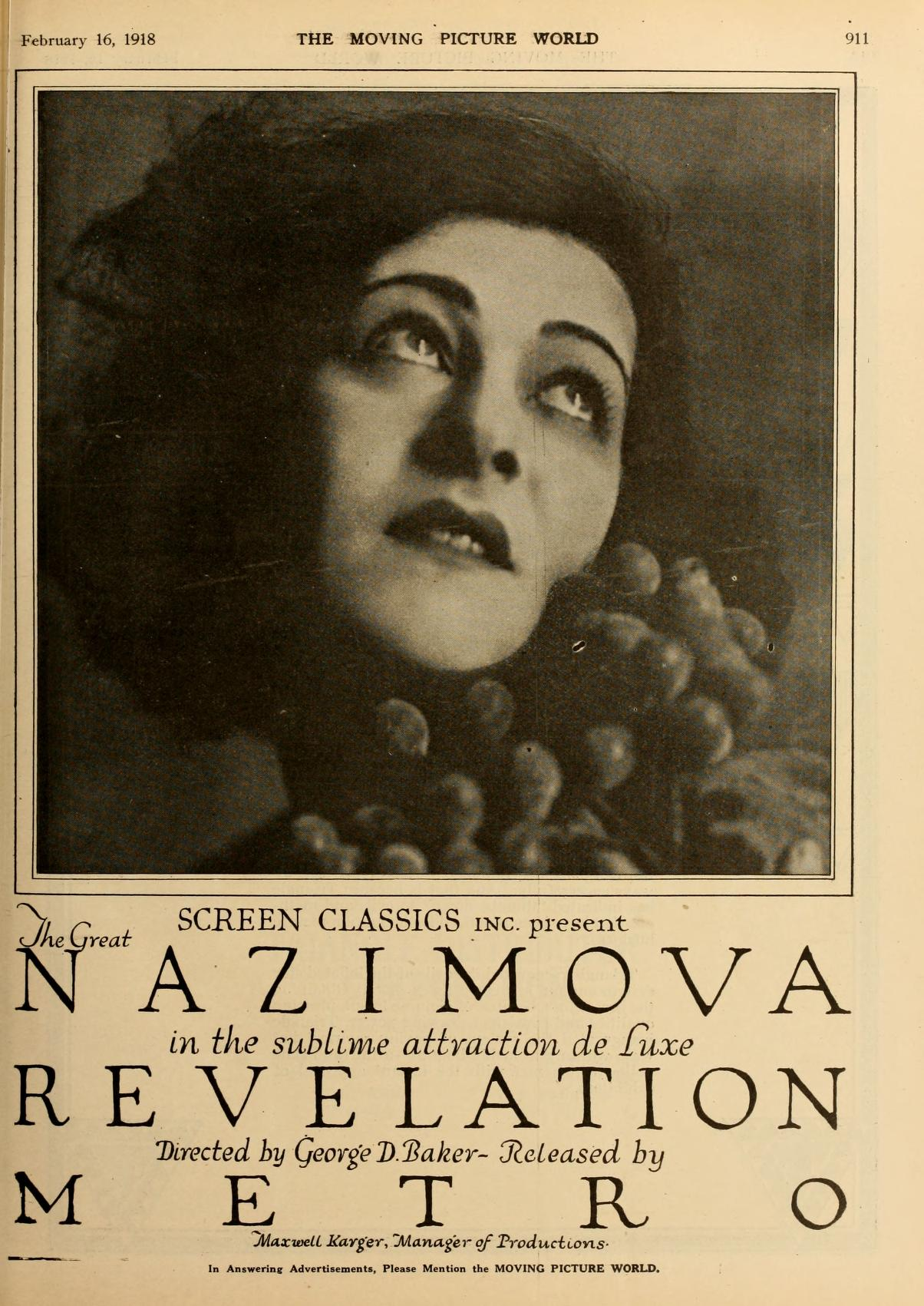
- Directed by: George D. Baker
- Written by: Ethel Browning (scenario); George D. Baker (scenario)
- Based on: The Rose Bush of a Thousand Years by Mabel Wagnalls
- Starring: Alla Nazimova
- Cinematography: Ray Smallwood; Eugene Gaudio
- Production company: Metro Pictures
- Distributed by: Metro Pictures
- Release date: February 17, 1918
- Running time: 70 minutes
- Country: United States
- Language: Silent (English intertitles)

Revelation is a 1918 American silent drama film directed by George D. Baker and starring Alla Nazimova. The film was produced and distributed through Metro Pictures.

A print of the film has been preserved.

== Plot ==
As described in a film magazine, Joline (Nazimova), a young dancer, attracts the attentions of a young artist, Paul (Bryant), and she consents to pose for him. He receives a commission to paint a picture of the Madonna beside a sacred rose bush at a monastery. Events bring Joline to a realization of her useless life and she leaves Paul to devote the rest of her life to a good cause. The war reunites the two lovers when Paul, a soldier, is wounded and Joline is called on care for him.

== Cast ==
- Charles Bryant as Paul Granville
- Alla Nazimova as Joline
- Frank Currier as The Prior
- Syn De Conde (Brazilian dancer and actor) as Duclos
- Bigelow Cooper as Count Adrian de Roche
- John Martin as Fra Augustine
- Eugene Borden as Pierre
- Phil Sanford as Mestaire (credited as Philip Sanford)
- True James as The Monastery Gatekeeper
- D.H. Turner as German Officer (credited as Dave Turner)
- Fred Radcliffe as Patin
- A.C. Hadley as Fochard
- Hazel Washburn as Madeleine Brevort
