= Stronger Than Death (1920 film) =

1920 film by Herbert Blaché

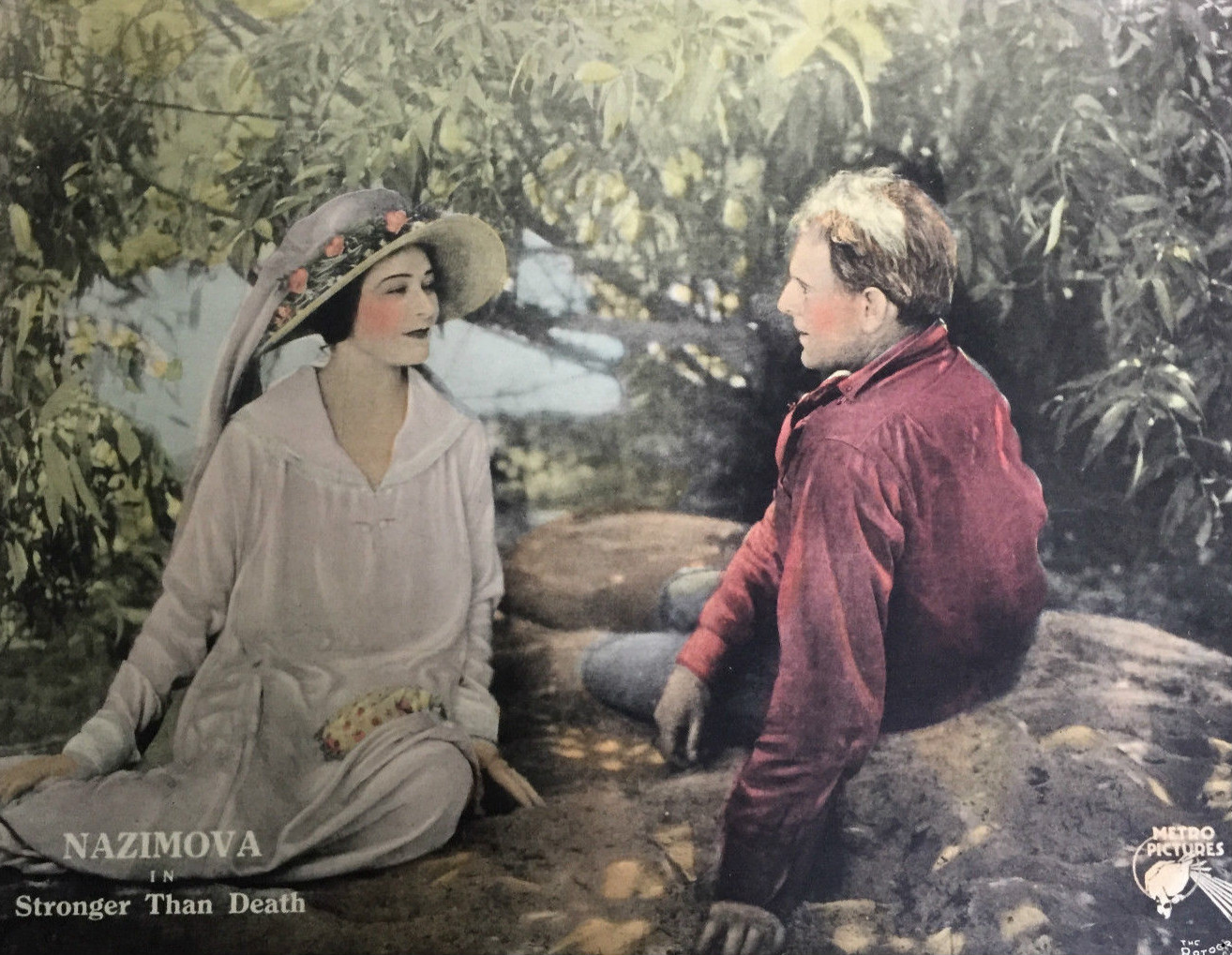
- Lobby card
- Directed by: Herbert Blaché; Charles Bryant; Robert Z. Leonard
- Written by: Charles Bryant; I. A. R. Wylie
- Produced by: Richard A. Rowland; Maxwell Karger; Alla Nazimova
- Starring: Alla Nazimova
- Cinematography: Rudolph Bergquist
- Distributed by: Metro Pictures
- Release date: January 11, 1920
- Running time: 70 minutes; 7 reels
- Country: United States
- Language: Silent (English intertitles)

Stronger Than Death is a 1920 American silent romantic drama film directed by Herbert Blaché and produced by and starring Alla Nazimova. It was distributed by Metro Pictures.

This movie was preserved by MGM, the inheritor of Metro Pictures library, with a print in the George Eastman Museum Motion Picture Collection.

== Plot ==
As described in a film magazine, Major Tristam Boucicault (Bryant) endeavors to get his father Colonel Boucicault (French) to aid him in fighting the cholera in the distant city of Bjura, where he is the lone physician fighting the disease. The colonel refuses and the son, angered, leaves in an ugly mood. His attention is arrested by Sigrid Fersen (Nazimova), who is being entertained by the officers and their wives. She promises to aid him and follows the major to Bjura. She raises a large sum at a bazaar. Here she refuses the hand of James Barclay (Prior), a wealthy half-breed that the elite have refused to recognize socially. Sigrid overhears a conversation between James and the high priest of a temple during which it is disclosed that the colonel is in reality James' father. James is planning the ruin of Colonel Boucicault. In an altercation between the colonel and major, Tristam strikes his father down. James sees the fight and under penalty of disclosing the facts forces Sigrid to marry him that night. At the wedding dinner, Colonel Boucicault denounces James for attempting to incite a mutiny in the camp, and James swears vengeance upon him as his father. Sigrid is urged to go to the temple and dance for the natives to keep them from joining the mutiny, while the major goes to collect the colonel's troops and surround the temple. James shoots the high priest as he is about to plunge a dagger into Sigrid, and the natives fall upon James and kill him. Major Boucicault takes the exhausted dancer to his hut where she recovers consciousness and determines to live for the love that is stronger than death.

== Cast ==
- Alla Nazimova as Sigrid Fersen
- Charles Bryant as Major Tristam Boucicault
- Charles K. French as Colonel Boucicault
- Margaret McWade as Mrs. Boucicault
- Herbert Prior as James Barclay
- William Orlamond as Rev. Mr. Meredith (credited as William H. Orlamond)
- Milla Davenport as Mrs. Smithers
- Bhowgan Singh as Ayeshi
- Henry Harmon as Vahana
- Dagmar Godowsky
