= A Doll's House (1922 film) =

1922 film by Charles Bryant

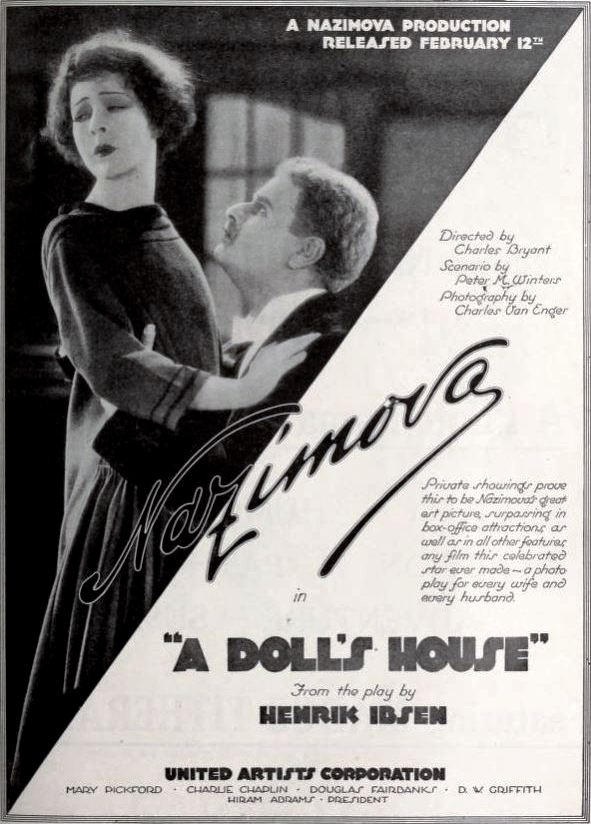
- Movie poster
- Directed by: Charles Bryant
- Written by: Peter M. Winters (aka Alla Nazimova) (scenario)
- Based on: A Doll's House by Henrik Ibsen
- Produced by: Alla Nazimova
- Cinematography: Charles Van Enger
- Edited by: Lou L. Ostrow
- Distributed by: United Artists
- Release date: February 12, 1922
- Running time: 7 reels; 6,650 feet
- Country: United States
- Language: Silent (English intertitles)

A Doll's House is a 1922 American silent drama film produced by and starring Alla Nazimova and directed by her husband Charles Bryant. The couple released the film through United Artists. It is based on the 1879 play A Doll's House by Henrik Ibsen with the scenario written by Nazimova under the pseudonym Peter M. Winters. The film was the fourth silent version filmed of the play, being preceded by a 1918 Paramount film directed by Maurice Tourneur. The film is classified as being lost.

== Plot ==
As described in a film magazine, in a slightly modernized version of the story that could take place in any town, Torvald Helmer is ill at home, and is ordered by his physician Dr. Rank to a southern clime. His wife Nora Helmer forges her father's name to a bank note to raise money to save her husband's life.

Six years later, when she has but one payment left on the note, Nils Krogstad threatens to expose her unless she intercedes and prevents her husband from discharging him from the bank. Nora begs her husband to have Krogstad remain.

Torvald learns her reason for her request and accuses Nora unjustly. When Krogstad returns Nora's note marked "paid," Torvald is overjoyed that his own reputation is saved, and agrees to overlook the past. Nora, however, decides that her first duty is to be a human being and leaves her husband and children. She walks out into the storm and declares that it is "the end and the beginning."

== Cast ==
- Alan Hale as Torvald Helmer
- Alla Nazimova as Nora Helmer
- Nigel De Brulier as Dr. Rank
- Elinor Oliver as Anna
- Wedgwood Nowell as Nils Krogstad
- Clara Lee as Ellen
- Florence Fisher as Mrs. Linden
- Philippe De Lacy as Ivar
- Barbara Maier as Emmy
