= Billions (film) =

1920 film

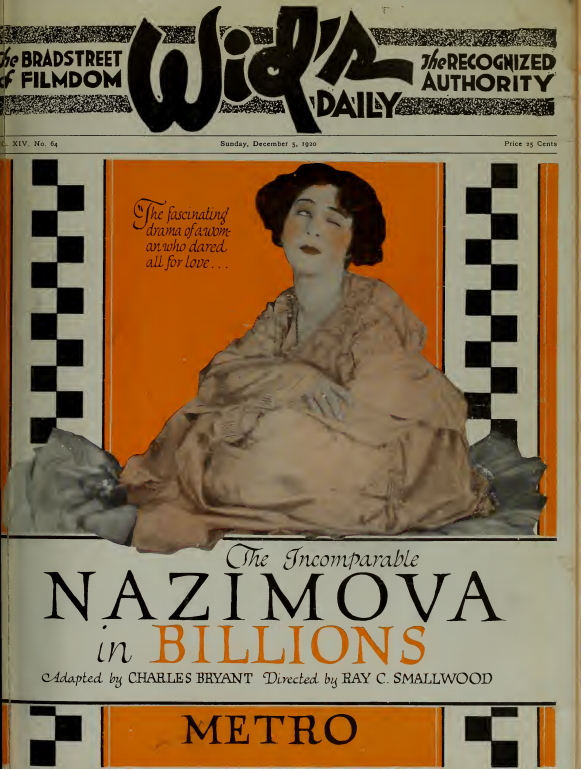
- Directed by: Ray C. Smallwood
- Written by: Charles Whittaker (adaptation of play); Charles Bryant (scenario); Alla Nazimova (intertitles)
- Based on: L'Homme riche by Jean Jose Frappa; Henry Dupuy-Mazuel
- Produced by: Alla Nazimova
- Starring: Alla Nazimova
- Cinematography: Rudolph J. Bergquist
- Edited by: Alla Nazimova
- Distributed by: Metro Pictures
- Release date: December 6, 1920
- Running time: 6 reels
- Country: United States
- Language: Silent (English intertitles)

Billions is a lost 1920 American silent comedy film produced by and starring Alla Nazimova and distributed by Metro Pictures. Ray Smallwood directed. It is based on a French play, L'Homme riche, by Jean Jose Frappa and Henry Dupuy-Mazuel.

== Cast ==
- Alla Nazimova - Princess Triloff
- Charles Bryant - Krakerfeller / Owen Carey
- William J. Irving - Frank Manners
- Victor Potel - Pushkin
- John Steppling - Isaac Colben
- Marian Skinner - Mrs. Colben
- Emmett King - John Blanchard
- Eugene H. Klum - The Bellboy
