= The Brat (1919 film) =

1919 film by Herbert Blaché

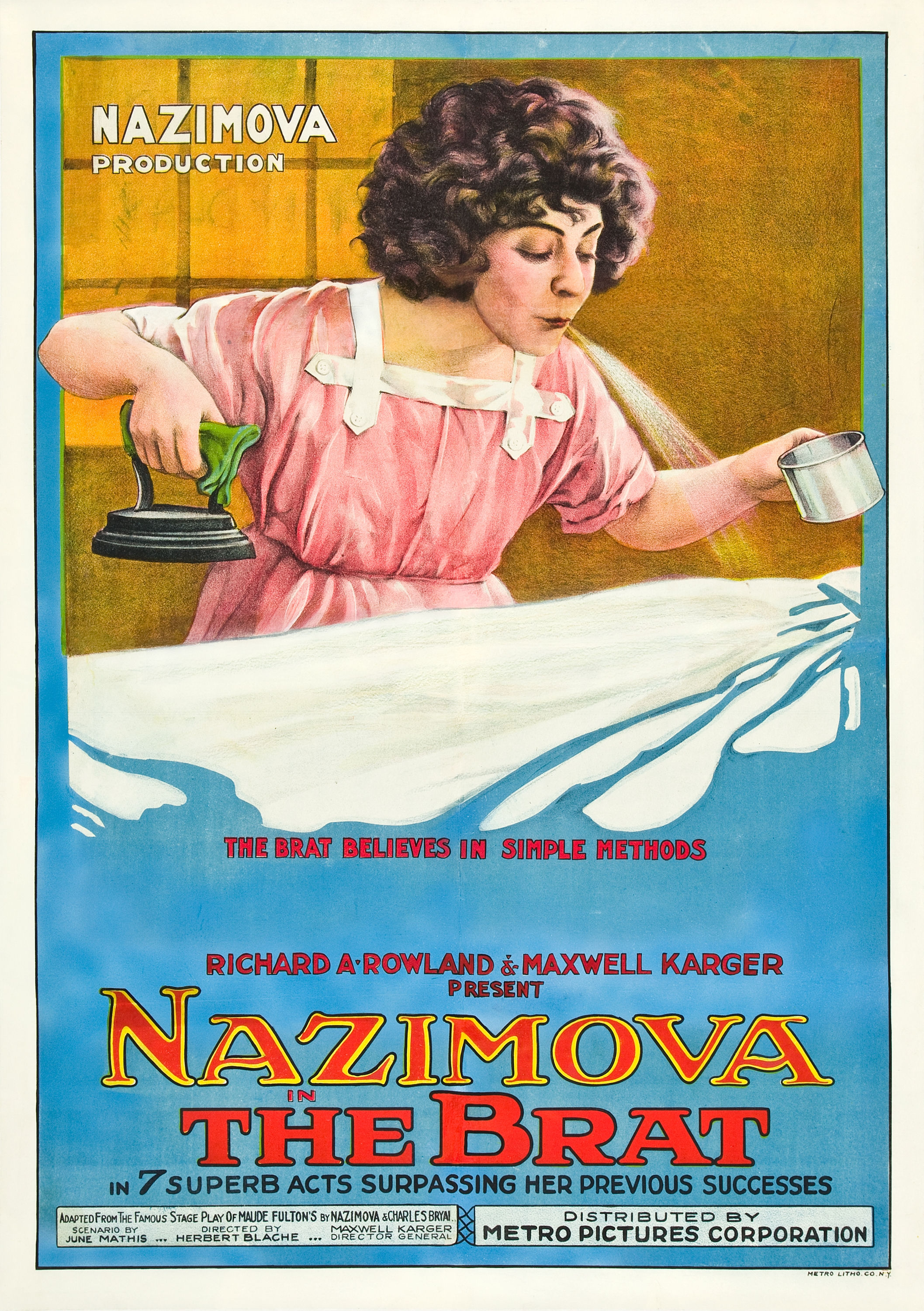
- Lobby poster
- Directed by: Herbert Blache
- Written by: June Mathis (scenario, titles); Charles Bryant (writer); Alla Nazimova (writer)
- Based on: The Brat by Maude Fulton
- Produced by: Alla Nazimova; Richard Rowland; Maxwell Karger
- Starring: Alla Nazimova
- Cinematography: Eugene Gaudio
- Distributed by: Metro Pictures
- Release date: September 1, 1919
- Running time: 7 reels
- Country: United States
- Language: Silent (English intertitles)

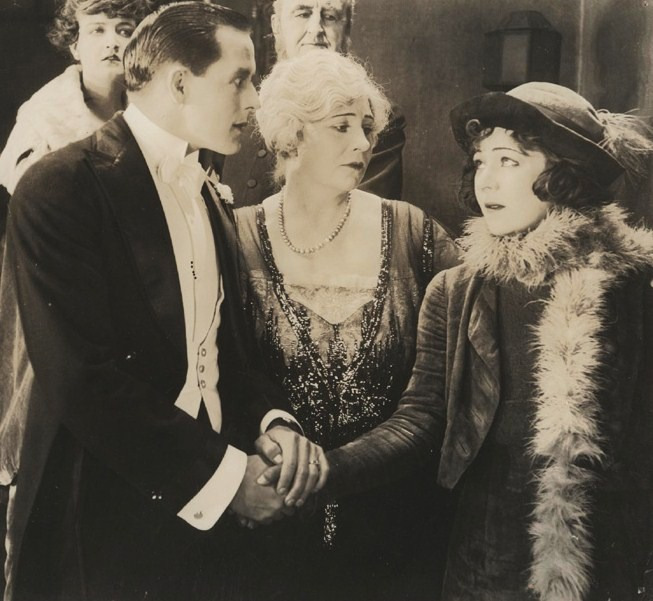
Film still with Charles Bryant, Amy Veness, and Alla Nazimova.

The Brat is a 1919 American silent drama film produced by and starring Alla Nazimova and directed by Herbert Blache. The film was released by Metro Pictures, who had Nazimova under contract, and is based on Maude Fulton's 1917 Broadway play in which she starred. It was remade as the 1931 film The Brat with Sally O'Neil in the lead role. The film is lost.

== Plot ==
As described in a film magazine, the Brat, a chorus girl known by no other name, is discharged from the Summer Garden chorus when she refuses to submit to the advances of Stephen Forrester, a young waster. He follows her down the street and quarrel ensues, after which she is arrested.

At court she is found by MacMillan Forrester, her prosecutor's elder brother, who is a novelist in search of an underworld character to study. The judge allows her to go to his home to live for that purpose. Here her unvarnished manner cause Forrester's fiancée and her father, as well as Mrs. Forrester, much uneasiness.

The Brat keeps Stephen's record a secret out of respect for his brother. When the novel is finished and the Brat is about to leave, Stephen attempts to rob MacMillan's safe and the Brat takes the blame.

Stephen then makes a clean breast of the affair which exonerates the Brat, and MacMillan's fiancée releases him to marry the woman he has learned to love.

== Cast ==
- Alla Nazimova as The Brat
- Charles Bryant as MacMillan Forrester
- Amy Veness as Mrs. Forrester
- Frank Currier as The Bishop
- Darrell Foss as Stephen Forrester
- Bonnie Hill as Angela
- Milla Davenport as The Brat's Aunt
- Henry Kolker as A Dandy
- Ethelbert Knott as Butler
