= Kevyn Aucoin =

American make-up artist and photographer

- Aucoin in 2000
- Born: Kevyn James Aucoin; February 14, 1962; Shreveport, Louisiana, U.S.
- Died: May 7, 2002 (aged 40); Valhalla, New York, U.S.
- Resting place: Holy Mary Mother of God Cemetery
- Occupations: Makeup artist, photographer, author
- Years active: 1983–2002
- Website: kevynaucoin.com

Kevyn James Aucoin (/oʊˈkwæ̃/; February 14, 1962 – May 7, 2002) was an American make-up artist, photographer and author. He authored several books with makeup techniques including facial contouring, which was relatively unknown in popular culture at the time, but pioneered and used in drag culture and stage makeup for decades prior.

== Early life ==
Aucoin was born in Shreveport, Louisiana and grew up in Lafayette, Louisiana. Born to a teenage single mother, he was adopted as an infant by Isidore Adrian Aucoin and Thelma (née Melancon) Aucoin. His three siblings, Carla, Kim, and Keith, were adopted as well.

Aucoin was interested in makeup from the time he was a child, and frequently did his sisters' makeup and photographed the results with a Polaroid camera—something he'd do throughout his career. Afraid to buy makeup, he would shoplift it. The guilt of stealing and fear of getting caught made him stop.

He realized he was gay at age six. His parents were unaware of their son's sexual orientation; his mother later said, "I didn't think Kevyn was a sissy; I just thought he was a gentle child." Years later, his parents became staunch advocates for LGBTQ rights, and started a chapter of P-FLAG in Lafayette.

Aucoin was relentlessly bullied in school. In one instance, a teacher spanked his bare buttocks in class, which Aucoin later regarded as sexual abuse. The bullying escalated in high school. When he was chased by some classmates in a truck, he dropped out. He then enrolled in cosmetology school to take a makeup class. Instead, his self-taught skills resulted in his becoming the instructor at age 18.

Aucoin then worked in a small corner of an exclusive women's store in Lafayette. But women were uncomfortable with a man doing their makeup. His mother Thelma recalled, "It was $30 for a makeup lesson, and these were women who paid $3,000 for a dress, but they'd never let him."

In 1982, Aucoin moved to Baton Rouge, Louisiana, thinking a larger city could help build his career as a makeup artist. He soon experienced the homophobia he'd endured in Lafayette. Kevyn and two male friends went to Godchaux's, a local department store, to browse the newest makeup. A security guard approached them and said "upstairs or downtown"—meaning they could be taken to the store's security office or be arrested. All three men opted for the security office, where they were beaten by security personnel. Fearing for his life if he stayed in Louisiana, he moved to New York City with his then-boyfriend Jed Root, who sometimes posed as his manager.

== Career ==
The first year he was in New York, Aucoin did makeup on test models for free to build up his portfolio. He and Root were broke, living in an apartment that often had no heat. Word of his makeup skills began circulating, and he was contacted by Vogue. For the next year and a half, he worked daily with Vogue photographer Steven Meisel. In the three years following his first Vogue shoot, he did a total of 18 more. In 1984, he collaborated on Ultima 2 Nakeds line, the first line based solely on skin tones. However, his Vogue cover shoot with emerging supermodel Cindy Crawford in 1986 skyrocketed his career. During 1987–89, he did nine Vogue covers in a row, and an additional seven Cosmopolitan covers. He became one of the best-paid celebrity makeup artists in history. Unlike most makeup artists at the time, he would refuse to do makeup on models he felt were too young.

Aucoin's philosophy was that every woman is beautiful within, and makeup was simply his tool for helping her discover that beauty. He wrote a regular column about this philosophy for Allure. A comment he made in a 2000 column, calling members of the National Rifle Association of America (NRA) "morons", drew a record amount of mail and a few death threats.

In 1983, Revlon hired Aucoin, at the age of 21, as Creative Director for their prestige Ultima II line of cosmetics. A year later, Aucoin would launch The New Nakeds (later renamed The Nakeds), a cosmetics line that was a strong counterpoint to those available at the time. Linda Wells, editor of Allure magazine, said of the line: "It may not seem like it, but it was a powerful moment. Before, there were makeup lines for white women and others for black women. But he worked to design makeup for all skin tones. The idea was to empower a woman by revealing her natural beauty, and not to cover her up with layers of product."

The New Nakeds embraced a radically different aesthetic than the norm of the time: foundations that featured a yellow undertone, instead of pink or peach; eyeshadows, lipstick and blushes were brown-based, neutral tones that were free of the pastel, vivid, or sparkly colors. Although Ultima II (and all of Revlon's beauty divisions) were in a decline at the time, the New Nakeds resuscitated interest in the brand and helped re-establish Ultima II as a viable competitor in the prestige arena.

=== Inoui cosmetics ===
Later, Aucoin would work with Japanese cosmetics giant Shiseido on their Inoui line.

== Celebrity work, writing, and appearances ==
Aucoin worked with hundreds of celebrities, including Jennifer Lopez, Madonna, Whitney Houston, Cher, Tori Amos, Diana Ross, Jewel, Julianne Moore, Sharon Stone, Julia Roberts, Mary Tyler Moore, Brooke Shields, Christina Ricci, Isabella Rossellini, Cheri Oteri, Gina Gershon, Winona Ryder, Demi Moore, Kim Basinger, Liza Minnelli, Janet Jackson, Tina Turner, Gwyneth Paltrow, Lisa Marie Presley, Courtney Love, and Vanessa L. Williams.

He began publishing his creations in books: The Art of Makeup, Making Faces, and Face Forward, two of which became Time magazine best sellers; Making Faces debuted at number one. Face Forward was widely noted for introducing makeup sculpting and contouring to the general public for the first time.

In 1999 he received an honorary diploma from Harvey Milk High School for his support of gay and transgender youth.

== Personal life ==
Aucoin eventually found his birth parents, and was able to personally meet them and his half-siblings.

He was in a long-term relationship with Eric Sakas, who remained a close friend after their breakup. Sakas later became president and creative director of Kevyn Aucoin Beauty.

Aucoin began dating Jeremy Antunes in 1999. They married in Hawaii in 2000, in an unofficial ceremony since same-sex marriage was not legally recognized at the time. Aucoin's 15-year-old niece, Samantha, lived with them after Aucoin obtained legal guardianship.

== Death ==
In September 2001, after increasing amounts of back pain and headaches, Aucoin was diagnosed with a rare pituitary tumor. He had been suffering from acromegaly resulting from the tumor for much of his life, but it had gone undiagnosed. He underwent a successful surgery and had the tumor removed, but continued to experience pain.

Aucoin began taking increasing amounts of prescription and non-prescription painkillers to ease his physical and mental suffering. Antunes implored Aucoin to get help, and Aucoin made many attempts to recover, but could not stop the drug use entirely. Antunes went to Paris for a week to be alone. That same week, Aucoin's health rapidly declined and he was hospitalized. Antunes' leaving Aucoin for what became the last week of his life created animosity between Aucoin's family and Antunes, resulting in Antunes being locked out of the home he shared with Aucoin.

Aucoin died on May 7, 2002, at Westchester Medical Center in Valhalla, New York of kidney and liver failure due to acetaminophen toxicity, caused by prescription painkillers. His mother Thelma died soon afterwards in October 2002, ostensibly from grief. Despite his instructions that his ashes be scattered in Hawaii, at the site where he and Antunes married, Aucoin's ashes are interred with his mother in Louisiana. The Kevyn Aucoin Beauty brand has remained in business since his death.

== Posthumous media ==
Kevyn Aucoin: A Beautiful Life—The Success, Struggles, and Beauty Secrets of a Legendary Makeup Artist was published in 2003 by Atria Books and Simon and Schuster. The book was edited by Kerry Diamond and reviewed Aucoin's career through celebrity interviews, his beauty tips and techniques, and over 250 photographs.

Kevyn Aucoin: Beauty & The Beast In Me, a documentary directed by Lori Kaye, features Aucoin's own personal videos taken throughout his life. It premiered as the documentary centerpiece at Outfest in July 2017 and had its TV debut on Logo TV on September 14, 2017. The film was also featured in the 125th anniversary (September 2017) issue of Vogue Magazine.

Larger Than Life: The Kevyn Aucoin Story is feature-length documentary directed by Tiffany Bartok. The film focuses on the rise his career and the legacy he left behind. The film also highlights Aucoin's LGBTQ activism, from his struggle to live openly as a young gay man in his hometown, to marrying his partner and creating a family of his own. It also addresses the issues behind Aucoin's untimely death. It premiered at the 25th Hamptons International Film Festival in October 2017, and its New York City premiere was featured in Doc NYC in November 2017. Aucoin's former partner, Eric Sakas, is an associate producer of the film.

== In popular culture ==
The Tori Amos song "Taxi Ride" from her 2002 album Scarlet's Walk is a partial homage to Aucoin. He made a cameo appearance in a fourth season episode (Episode 2: "The Real Me") of the long-running HBO series Sex and the City. He was a major fan of the Comedy Central show Strangers With Candy and appeared in an episode alongside Amy Sedaris and Stephen Colbert as a funeral makeup artist (Season 2, Episode 4: The Goodbye Guy). In the show Fat Actress debut episode "Big Butts", Kirstie Alley's female hair and makeup artist goes by the name Kevyn after her inspiration Kevyn Aucoin.

== Books authored ==
- The Art of Makeup, Harper-Collins Publishers. 1994. 176p. illus. (ISBN 0-060-17186-3)
- The Art of Makeup, Perennial Currents. 1996. 176p. illus. (ISBN 0-062-73042-8)
- Making Faces, Little, Brown. 1999. 160p. illus. (ISBN 0-316-28686-9, ISBN 0-316-28685-0)
- Face Forward, Little, Brown. 2000. 175p. illus. (ISBN 0-316-28644-3, ISBN 0-316-28705-9)
