= Eye for Eye (film) =

1918 film

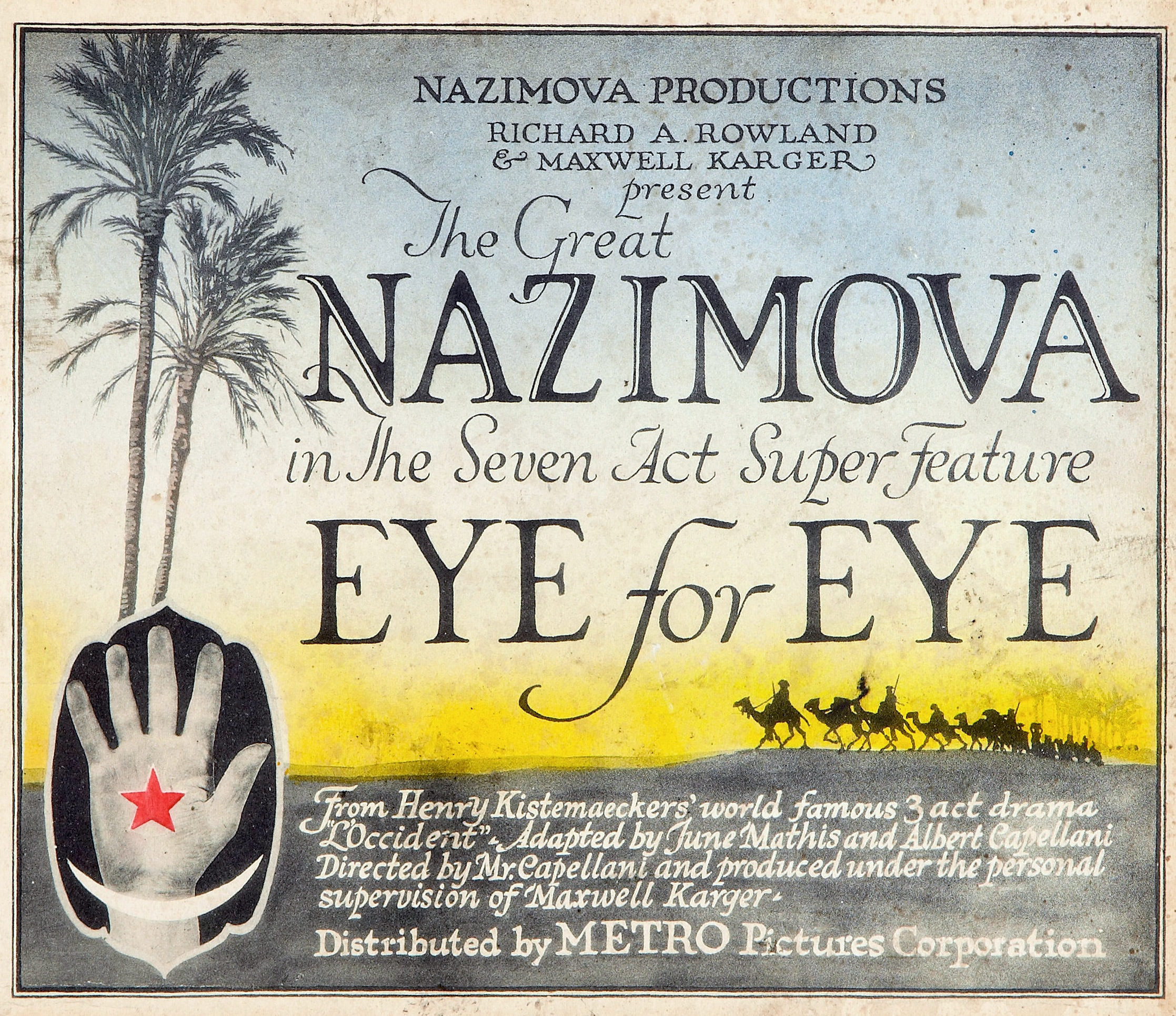
- Lobby card
- Directed by: Albert Capellani
- Written by: Henry Kistemaeckers (play); June Mathis; Albert Capellani
- Produced by: Richard A. Rowland; Maxwell Karger; Alla Nazimova
- Starring: Alla Nazimova
- Cinematography: Eugene Gaudio
- Distributed by: Metro Pictures
- Release date: December 22, 1918
- Running time: 7 reels
- Country: United States
- Language: Silent (English intertitles)

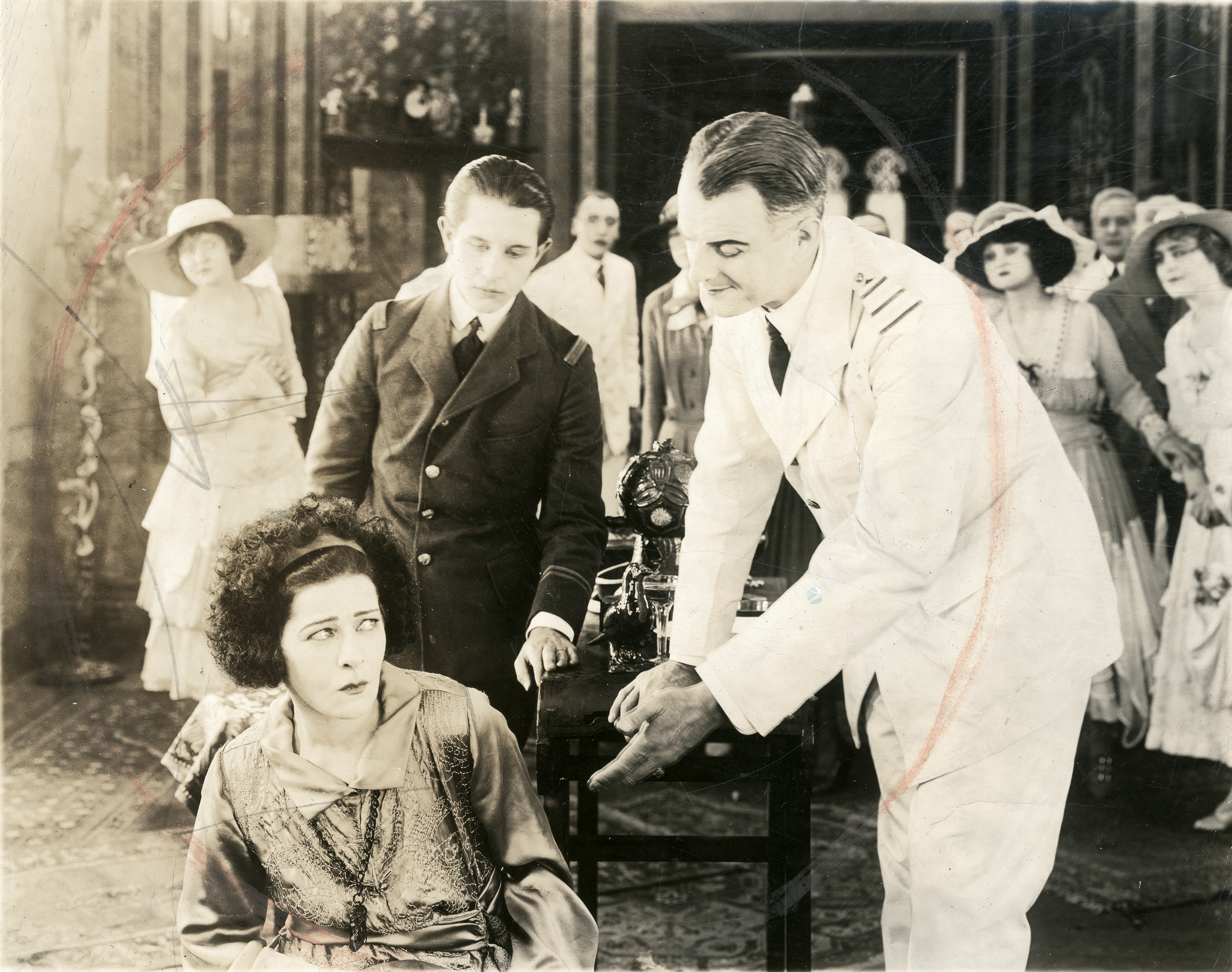
Scene from the film.

Eye for Eye is a lost 1918 American silent drama film directed by Albert Capellani. It was produced by Richard A. Rowland and Alla Nazimova and distributed by Metro Pictures. Nazimova is also the star in a production scripted by June Mathis. A trailer of the film is currently held in the Library of Congress, and evidence has arisen that a copy may exist in Gosfilmofond in Russia.

== Plot ==
As described in a film magazine, Arabs have captured the French Captain de Cadiere (Bryant), but he escapes with the help of Hassouna (Nazimova), a young Bedouin woman of the desert. She is abandoned to die by the irate sheik (Stern), is captured by marauders of the desert sands, and is sold in slavery to the manager of a small French circus. The Captain, at a show near a small town where his ship is anchored, finds the Bedouin woman and takes her to his home. After hearing that the Captain's detachment has killed all of her tribe in the desert, she vows vengeance upon the Frenchman. However, she fails in the execution of her threat due to his love for her.

== Cast ==
- Alla Nazimova as Hassouna
- Charles Bryant as Captain de Cadiere
- Donald Gallaher as Ensign Arnauld
- Sally Crute as Madame Helene de Cadiere
- E. L. Fernandez as Taieb
- John Reinhardt as Paul Lecroix
- Louis Stern as The Sheik
- Charles Eldridge as Tootit, the Clown
- Hardee Kirkland as Rambert, Circus Proprietor
- Miriam Battista as Hassouna's Little Sister
- William A. Cohill (unidentified role)
- William T. Carleton (unidentified role)

uncredited

- Anita Brown
- Barry Whitcomb

== Reception ==
Like many American films of the time, Eye for Eye was subject to restrictions and cuts by city and state film censorship boards. For example, the Chicago Board of Censors required a cut, in Reel 3, of the kissing between the wife and her lover, Reel 4, the lover kissing the woman on her shoulder, kissing between the married woman and lover at door, Reel 7, the vision of the party, and the nude woman on the couch.

== See also ==
- The West (1938)
