= The Heart of a Child (1920 film) =

1920 film

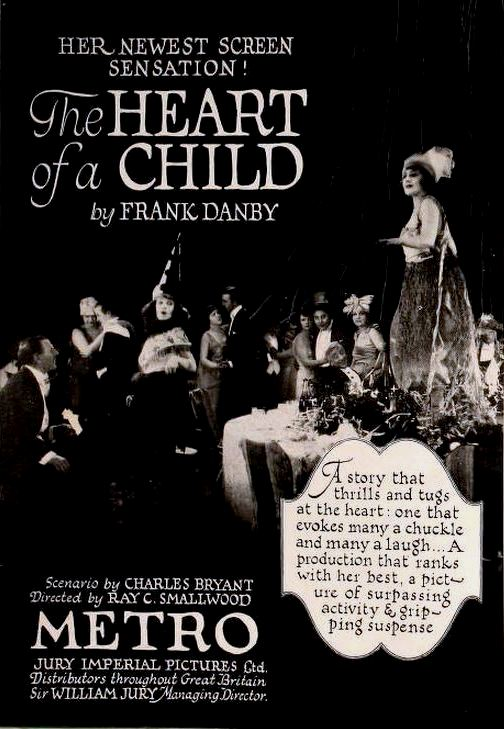
- Directed by: Ray Smallwood
- Written by: Charles Bryant
- Based on: The Heart of a Child by Frank Danby
- Produced by: Alla Nazimova
- Starring: Alla Nazimova; Charles Bryant
- Cinematography: Rudolph Bergquist
- Distributed by: Metro Pictures
- Release date: April 11, 1920
- Running time: 70 mins
- Country: USA
- Language: Silent...English intertitles

The Heart of a Child is a lost 1920 silent film drama directed by Ray Smallwood with Alla Nazimova as star. It was scripted by Charles Bryant, Nazimova's husband and co-star. Metro Pictures distributed.

== Cast ==
- Alla Nazimova - Sally Snape
- Charles Bryant - Lord Kidderminster
- Ray Thompson - Johnny Doone
- Nell Newman - Mary Murray
- Victor Potel - Charley Peastone
- Eugene Klum - Alf Stevens
- Claire DuBrey - Lady Dorothea
- Jane Sterling - Lady Fortive
- William Irving - Perry
- Myrtle Rishell - Miss Blaine
- Joseph Kilgour - Lord Fortive
- Rafael Icardo - Bit role
