= Garden of Allah Hotel =

Coordinates: 34°5′52.77″N 118°21′59.65″W

General information
- Type: Hotel
- Location: 8152 Sunset Boulevard (on the Sunset Strip); Hollywood, California
- Construction started: 1926; 100 years ago
- Completed: 1927; 99 years ago
- Opening: January 1927; 99 years ago
- Demolished: 1959; 67 years ago

The Garden of Allah was a famous hotel in West Hollywood, California, United States (then an unincorporated area of Los Angeles which was usually considered a part of Hollywood), at 8152 Sunset Boulevard between Crescent Heights and Havenhurst, at the east end of the Sunset Strip.

Originally a 2.5-acre (1.0 ha) estate called Hayvenhurst, it was built in 1913 as the private residence of real estate developer William H. Hay. Actress Alla Nazimova acquired the property in 1919. She converted it into a residential hotel in 1926 by adding 25 villas around the residence, which opened as the "Garden of Alla Hotel" in January 1927.

In 1930, new owners renamed it the "Garden of Allah Hotel" (adding an 'h'). The property operated under a succession of owners for three decades until the last, Bart Lytton, owner of Lytton Savings & Loan, demolished the hotel in 1959 and replaced it with his bank's main branch. The Lytton Savings main branch was later demolished, along with a strip mall next to it, to make way for a mixed-use development designed by Frank Gehry.

== History ==
=== Hayvenhurst ===
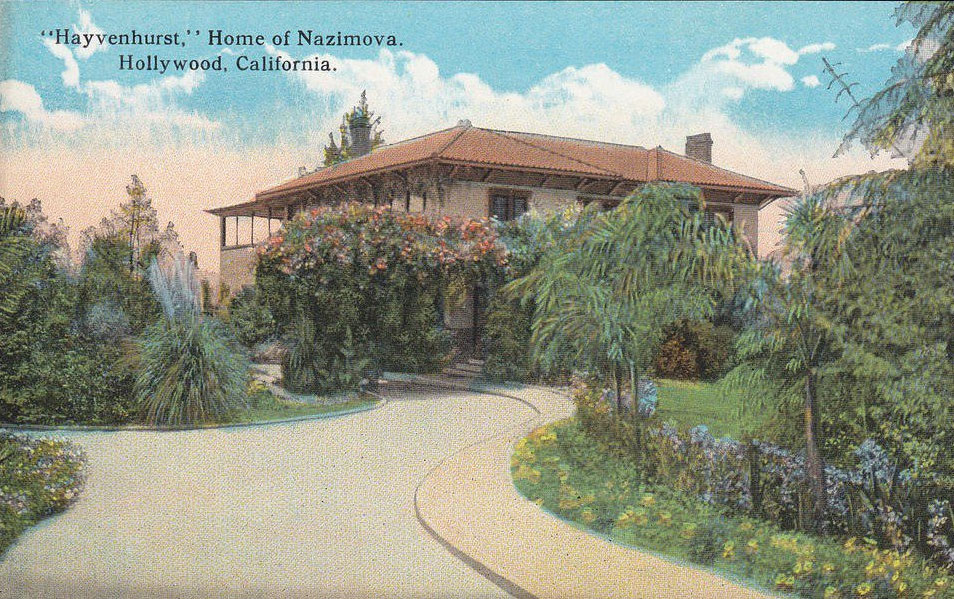
Hayvenhurst, an estate built by Canadian born William Hamilton Hay (1865–1946) in 1913 and later purchased by Alla Nazimova, who converted it into a hotel in 1927

The estate that later became the Garden of Allah Hotel was built in 1913 by real estate developer William H. Hay in the northwest corner of the Crescent Heights neighborhood, a 160-acre (65 ha) tract bounded by Sunset Boulevard on the north, Santa Monica Boulevard on the south, Crescent Avenue (later renamed Fairfax Avenue) on the east and Sweetzer Avenue on the west, which Hay had subdivided and developed starting in 1905.

The estate's original address was 8080 Sunset Boulevard but was later changed to 8152. It occupied a 2.5-acre (1.0 ha) lot that fronted Sunset Boulevard and was bounded by Crescent Heights Boulevard on the east and Hayvenhurst (now spelled Havenhurst) Drive on the west. The property's southern boundary was also the border between the Hollywood district of the city of Los Angeles and the then-unincorporated area that later became the city of West Hollywood.

Hay and his wife Katherine personally supervised construction of the estate. The house had twelve rooms and four bathrooms. The finishes were all in Circassian walnut that the Hays had collected on a trip to the Philippines in 1912. The interior walls were covered in canvas and hand-painted. The garage had bays for two cars—a rarity in those days—with rooms upstairs for live-in servants. Construction and landscaping cost an estimated $30,000.

The Hays' stay at Hayvenhurst was short-lived. Within a few years they had built and moved into a new house a few blocks east, at 7920 Sunset Boulevard, the site today of the Directors Guild of America headquarters. William Hay also purchased Encino Ranch, a large tract of land in the San Fernando Valley that he would later develop into the upscale Encino neighborhood of Los Angeles. Hayvenhurst reportedly stood unoccupied for several years.

=== Garden of Alla ===
Stage and screen actress Alla Nazimova leased Hayvenhurst from William Hay not long after she moved to Los Angeles from New York in 1918. She purchased it outright in 1919. Nazimova jokingly called her new home "The Garden of Alla", which was a reference to her own name and the best-selling 1904 novel The Garden of Allah, by British author Robert S. Hichens.

Faced with a financial crisis in the mid-1920s after her screen career derailed, Nazimova put her property to work generating an income by building a complex of 25 rental "villas" around the original house. The opening party for "The Garden of Alla Hotel" was held on January 9, 1927. She found her role as a hotel manager unsuitable and discovered that her partners in the enterprise had nearly bankrupted her, so in 1928 she sold out her remaining interest in the property, auctioned off most of her furniture and other household goods, and went back to the Broadway stage. By 1930, the owners had normalized the spelling in the hotel's name to "Allah".

After Nazimova's renewed Broadway success was cut short by illness in 1938, she returned to Hollywood and rented Villa 24, where she lived until her death in 1945.

=== Garden of Allah Hotel ===
Catering to both short-term and long-term guests, the hotel soon gained a reputation as a place where the famous could enjoy living in a quaint, cozy, village-like setting, conveniently located yet shielded from tourists and autograph seekers by discreet security patrols, under a management that was not inclined to probe, judge or interfere with the private—and sometimes public—activities of its often unconventional patrons.

The Garden of Allah became home to many celebrities and literary figures. F. Scott Fitzgerald lived there for several months in 1937–38 at the beginning of his final stay in Hollywood. He wrote himself a postcard while there: "Dear Scott — How are you? Have been meaning to come in and see you. I have living [sic] at the Garden of Allah. Yours, Scott Fitzgerald." Fitzgerald's biographer and lover Sheilah Graham later wrote a book about the place, titled simply The Garden of Allah.

Humorist and actor Robert Benchley was a frequent resident. An array of Golden Age Hollywood stars and featured players, ranging from Greta Garbo to Ronald Reagan, stayed there at least briefly, and so did classical music giants Sergei Rachmaninoff (who was musically assaulted there by an annoyed Harpo Marx), Igor Stravinsky and Jascha Heifetz. Humphrey Bogart lived in villa 8, where Errol Flynn stayed when Bogart was out of town. Gloria Stuart and Arthur Sheekman lived at villa 12. Dance band leaders Benny Goodman and Artie Shaw and vocalist Frank Sinatra were among the pop music personalities. Kay Thompson, then designing musical numbers for Judy Garland and her own nightclub act with The Williams Brothers, lived there; Thompson later wrote about a little girl who also lived in a hotel, Eloise.

=== Purchase by Lytton Savings and the site today ===
Although celebrities such as Errol Flynn were still calling it home as late as 1957, land values were rising, historic preservation was still an eccentric notion, and "redevelopment" was a popular civic buzzword.

On April 11, 1959, Bart Lytton, president of Lytton Savings and Loan, announced that he had purchased the Garden of Allah Hotel from Beatrice Rosenus and Morris Markowitz for $755,000. Lytton's plans for the property included razing the hotel to make way for a new main branch for his bank, which had formerly been headquartered in the Canoga Park neighborhood in the San Fernando Valley.

On August 22, 1959, Lytton hosted a farewell party on the grounds of the hotel. Among the attendees was silent film star Francis X. Bushman, who had been at the opening party in 1927. Some other guests came costumed as old-time stars. In a nod to the hotel's creator, Nazimova's experimental 1923 silent film Salomé was shown on a large poolside screen. On August 30, an on-site public auction liquidated all the furnishings, fixtures and equipment, along with odds and ends valuable only as souvenirs. Demolition permits were issued on November 2. Within days, all traces of the hotel were gone and construction of the bank building, designed by the Los Angeles-based architect Kurt Meyer in the Brutalist architectural style, had begun. The bank building was completed by 1960. By 1962, the bank building received an adjacent addition consisting of a museum and an auditorium called the Lytton Center. By 1968, only eight years after the bank building's completion, Lytton Savings was forced to declare bankruptcy, resulting in the closure of the bank building. The adjacent Lytton Center was closed the following year and converted into a strip mall. By the time the 2010s rolled around, the building was now home to a Chase bank. In 2016, the building was designated a Los Angeles Historic-Cultural Monument. However, in the same year, real estate developer Townscapes Partners secured approvals for a mixed-use development designed by architect Frank Gehry, which would require the razing of the former bank building. In response to this, the Los Angeles Conservancy and Friends of Lytton Savings advocacy group waged a preservation campaign to help prevent the building's demolition but ultimately, it was unsuccessful. By April 2021, the building was demolished while the adjacent strip mall (formerly Lytton Center) was demolished much later. As of 2023, the redevelopment of the site failed to push through, leaving the site nothing but an empty lot.

=== Miniature model ===
In 1960, the Garden of Allah reappeared on the site in the form of a detailed miniature model of the complex. For many years, this was on display outside Lytton's building, in a small plaza at the corner of Sunset and Crescent Heights, sheltered from the elements in a sort of shrine with a lofty domed pavilion. It was later moved indoors and eventually disappeared. It resurfaced in private hands in the early 2010s, architecturally intact and with its built-in miniature electric lighting system restored.

== Source of the name ==
The hotel's name was not a direct reference to Islam but rather to Nazimova's first name and the title of a 1905 novel, The Garden of Allah, by British writer Robert S. Hichens. The novel was adapted into a play first produced in London in 1909. Mary Mannering acted in the play in 1910. The novel also served as the basis for three movies, the final one of which starred Marlene Dietrich, who was once a resident of the hotel.

== Quotes about the Garden of Allah ==
It reminds me of Hollywood.

— George S. Kaufman, on why he liked living at the Garden of Allah.

I'll be damned if I'll believe anyone lives in a place called the Garden of Allah.

— Thomas Wolfe, a letter to F. Scott Fitzgerald, July 26, 1937

Nothing interrupted the continual tumult that was life at the Garden of Allah. Now and then the men in white came with a van and took somebody away, or bankruptcy or divorce or even jail claimed a participant in its strictly unstately sarabands. Nobody paid any mind.

— columnist Lucius Beebe, a frequent Garden resident

A light-hearted, unrealistic place.

— Sheilah Graham, The Garden of Allah

There is no place for a Garden of Allah that, for one brief moment, was Camelot. It was inevitable that Hollywood as we knew it, and its satellite, Alla's garden, should disappear together.

— Sheilah Graham, The Garden of Allah

Hollywood's and thus America's most unconventional hotel, actually "notorious" would be a more descriptive word.

— David Wallace, Lost Hollywood

In that lavish heyday of the parvenu, when everything was built to look like something it wasn't, a bungalow court with accommodations indistinguishable from a hundred other bungalow courts came to be called the Garden of Allah

— Budd Schulberg, The Disenchanted

== Famous residents and guests ==
A representative list of the Garden of Allah Hotel's famous guests:

- Lauren Bacall
- Tallulah Bankhead
- John Barrymore
- Donn Beach
- Lucius Beebe
- Robert Benchley
- Humphrey Bogart
- Clara Bow
- Louis Bromfield
- Louise Brooks
- Edgar Rice Burroughs
- Charles Butterworth
- Louis Calhern
- John Carradine
- Virginia Cherrill
- Mickey Cohen
- Buster Collier
- Ronald Colman
- Marc Connelly
- Gary Cooper
- Joan Crawford
- Jean Dalrymple
- Lili Damita
- Vic Damone
- Florence Desmond
- Marlene Dietrich
- F. Scott Fitzgerald
- Errol Flynn
- Greta Garbo
- Ava Gardner
- Dorothy Gish
- Jackie Gleason
- Jimmy Gleason
- Elinor Glyn
- Benny Goodman
- Frances Goodrich
- Ruth Gordon
- Sheilah Graham
- D.W. Griffith
- Albert Hackett
- Jon Hall
- Jed Harris
- Jascha Heifetz
- Lillian Hellman
- Ernest Hemingway
- Woody Herman
- Madeline Hurlock
- Garson Kanin
- George S. Kaufman
- Buster Keaton
- Muriel King
- Eartha Kitt
- Alexander Korda
- Elsa Lanchester
- Charles Laughton
- Frank Lawton
- Lila Lee
- John Loder
- Anita Louise
- Bessie Love
- Ernst Lubitsch
- Charles MacArthur
- Frances Marion
- Harpo Marx
- Zeppo Marx
- Groucho Marx
- Sam Marx
- Glesca Marshall
- Somerset Maugham
- Patty McCormack
- Ward Morehouse
- Nita Naldi
- Ramon Novarro
- Alla Nazimova
- David Niven
- John O'Hara
- Maureen O'Hara
- Walter O'Keefe
- Maureen O'Sullivan
- Clifford Odets
- Laurence Olivier
- Dorothy Parker
- Johnny Roselli
- S.J. Perelman
- Roland Petit
- Tyrone Power
- Sergei Rachmaninoff
- Ronald Reagan
- Flora Robson
- Ginger Rogers
- Harry Ruby
- Natalie Schafer
- Leon Shamroy
- Artie Shaw
- Mildred Shay
- Arthur Sheekman
- Robert E. Sherwood
- Frank Sinatra
- Red Skelton
- Everett Sloane
- Barbara Stanwyck
- John Steinbeck
- Donald Ogden Stewart
- Leopold Stokowski
- Igor Stravinsky
- Gloria Stuart
- Margaret Sullavan
- Kay Thompson
- Whitney Tower
- Forrest Tucker
- H.B. Warner
- Orson Welles
- Dame May Whitty
- Herbert Wilcox
- Hugh Williams
- Hope Williams
- John Hay "Jock" Whitney
- Alexander Woollcott
- Vincent Youmans

== In popular culture ==
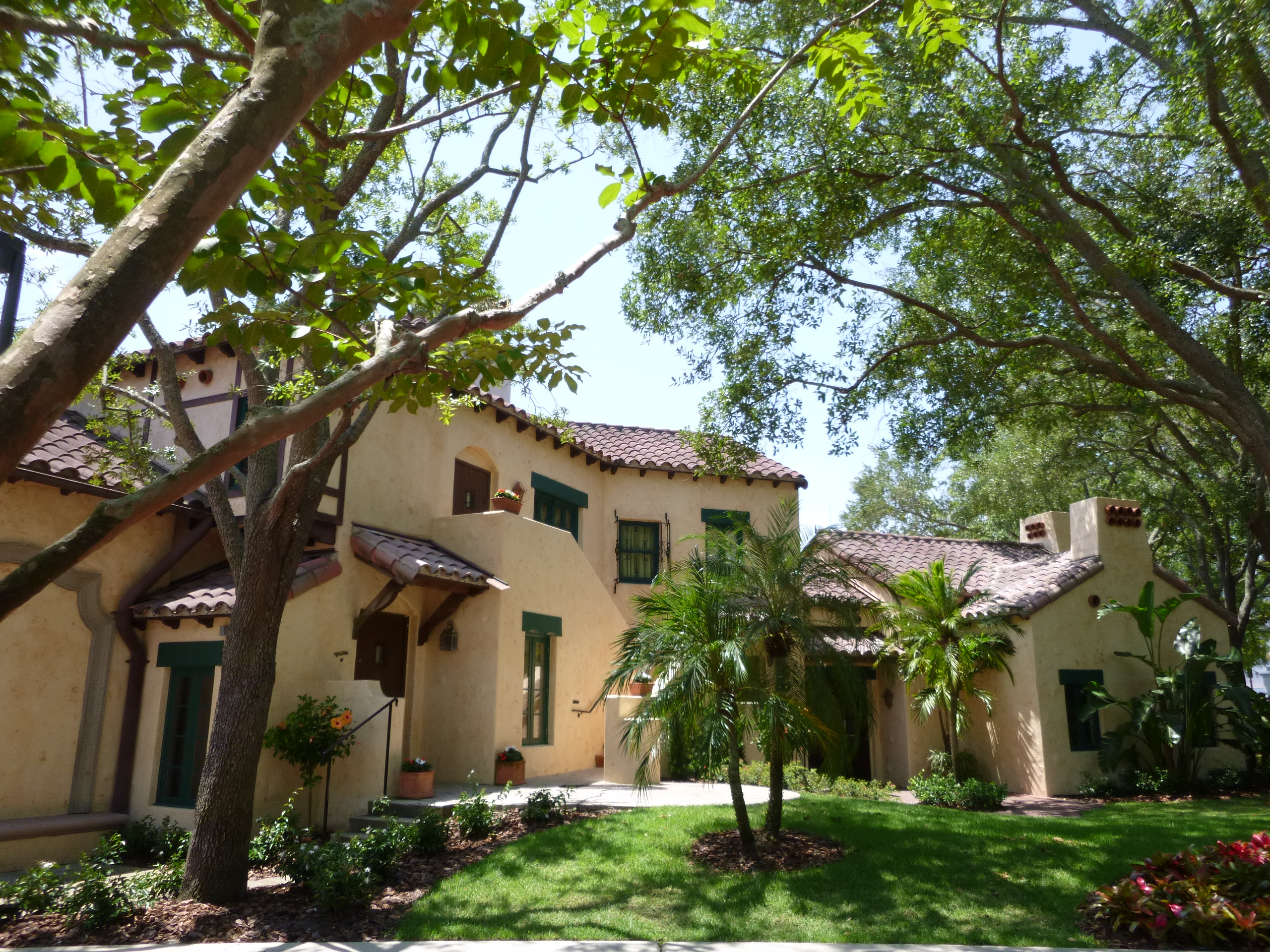
Garden of Allah villas at Universal Studios Florida inspired by the hotel.

- In 1956, just a few years before its demise, the Garden of Allah was one of the settings for Pamela Moore's novel Chocolates for Breakfast, the story of a teenage girl growing up with an actress mother.
- The Garden of Allah Hotel is mentioned in chapter 2 of the Ronald Reagan biography Killing Reagan by Bill O'Reilly. In the late 1940s it was where "Reagan reaches bottom when he wakes up one morning at the Garden of Allah Hotel on Sunset Boulevard and does not know the name of the woman lying next to him".
- Herman Wouk called the Garden "Rainbow's End" in Youngblood Hawke, his novel about a successful writer who goes to Hollywood.
- It is apparently an urban legend that the bulldozing of the Garden of Allah in 1959 inspired the line in Joni Mitchell's song "Big Yellow Taxi", "They paved paradise and put up a parking lot". Indeed, Mitchell later lived in the Laurel Canyon neighborhood in the hills north of the site. However, in an interview in the early 1970s, Mitchell stated that the lyrics were inspired in 1970 by her first trip to Hawaii, where she was struck by a jarring juxtaposition of nature and modern civilization. Also, the next line after "They paved paradise and put up a parking lot" is "With a pink hotel, a boutique and a swinging hot spot", which does not reflect what happened to the Garden of Allah site itself, on which a bank building was erected. There was, however, also a large parking lot on the site to serve that building; the nearby Chateau Marmont hotel and at least one other big, pinkish and even nearer residential building overlooked it; boutiques abounded on the Sunset Strip; and the "swinging", politically hot Pandora's Box nightclub was directly across Crescent Heights in the 1960s. The existence of a secondary source of inspiration has apparently not been explicitly denied in Mitchell's published comments.
- A 1985 play Across from the Garden of Allah by Charles Wood starred Glenda Jackson and Nigel Hawthorne. It was a marital drama set in a hotel across the street from the Garden of Allah.
- The hotel is the setting for a series of historical novels by Martin Turnbull that began with The Garden on Sunset (2012).
- In the 2013 film Gangster Squad, a signboard reading "Garden of Allah" is seen outside the apartment in which Ryan Gosling's character resides, just before the scene in which he wakes up with Emma Stone.
- The location of the Garden of Allah, which is now a bank building, is prominently displayed in a comical scene from the 1987 movie Barfly starring Mickey Rourke.
- Former Eagles singer and drummer Don Henley released the 1995 song Garden of Allah in honor of the hotel.
- Jonathan Winters, then appearing on The Tonight Show with Johnny Carson, described getting drunk one time with Johnny Carson at the hotel, years before becoming sober.
