= Highlighter (cosmetics) =

Type of cosmetic product that reflects light

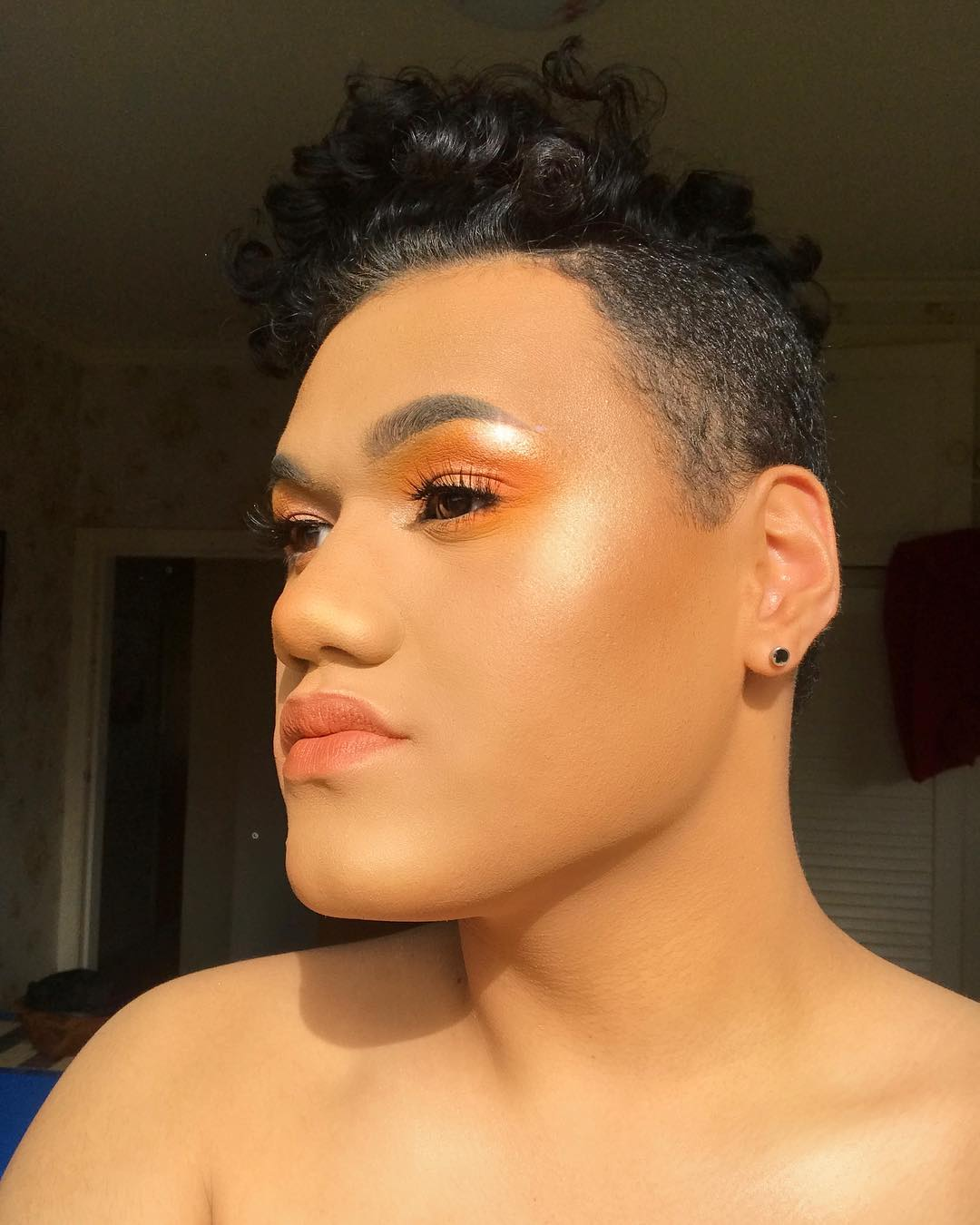
This person is wearing highlighter on their cheekbones and their outer browbone, beneath the eyebrow

Highlighter is a type of cosmetic product that reflects light. Often used for contouring, it can be applied to the face or other parts of the body to brighten the skin on a given area, create the perception of depth and angles. The product can come in a variety of forms, including powder, liquid, cream, gloss, solid stick and jelly.

Highlighters became a significant tool among theater and film actors shooting or performing indoors, where natural light was not available to define facial features like cheekbones, nose, and jawline. Highlighter also offers the possibility of heightening or diminishing a given feature to suit the character portrayed, as well as aesthetic trends.

Highlighters are usually made in the colour of white or champagne but can be in many other colours as well, including blue, pink, and rainbow, to suit certain makeup looks.

MAC Cosmetics Strobing Cream is credited as the first highlighter product to be made available to commercial consumers.

A long-time tool among makeup artists, highlighter sales saw significant gains among consumers in 2016. Some industry experts have attributed the growth in sales of highlighters and related products to the rise of social media usage, given the popularity of YouTube makeup tutorials and the proliferation of snapshot self-portraits.

== See also ==
- Bronzer
- Rouge (cosmetics)
