= Glesca Marshall =

American actress (1906–1987)

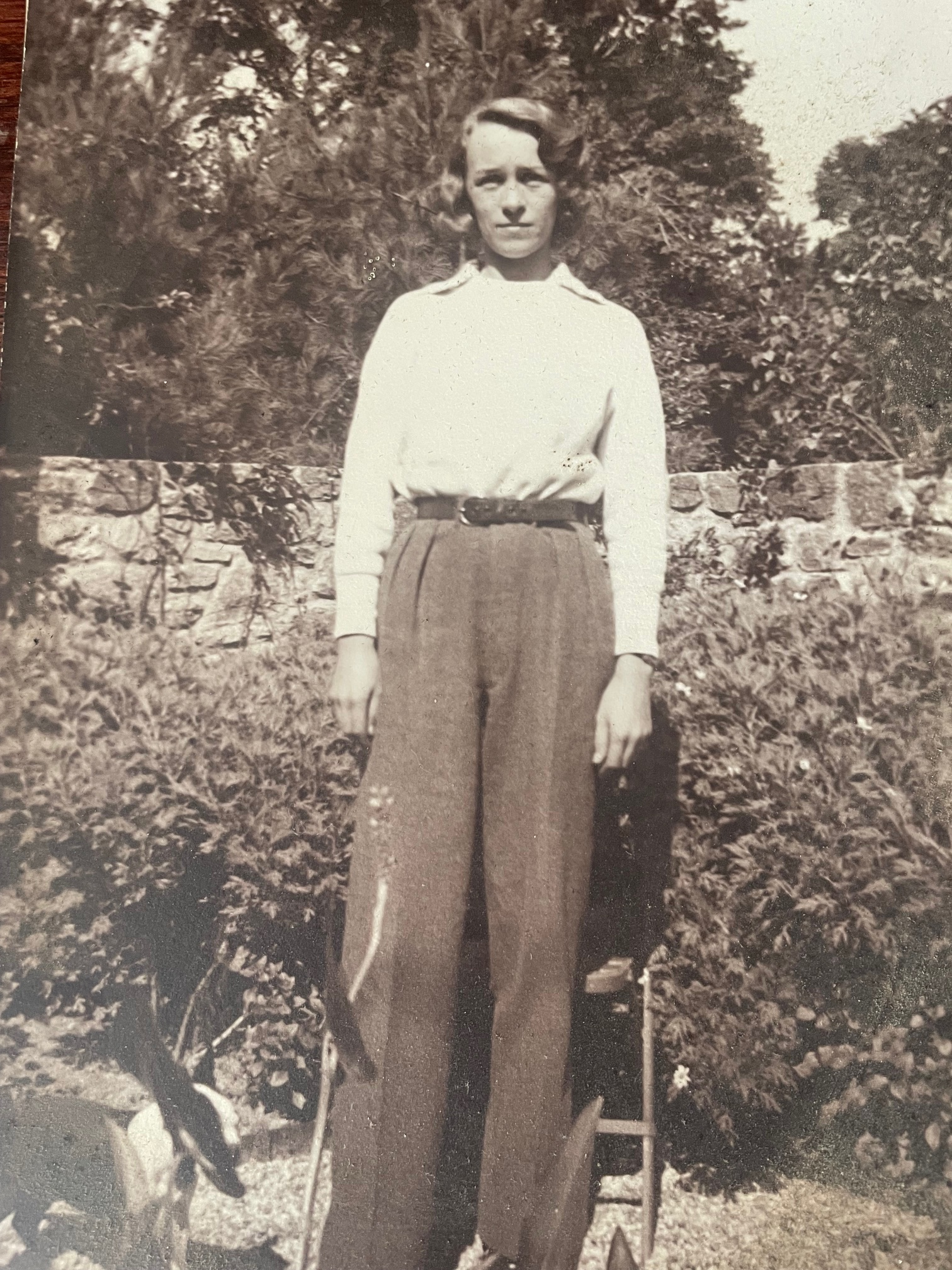
- Born: Catherine Glesca Marshall; September 19, 1906
- Died: August 21, 1987 (aged 80)
- Partner(s): Alla Nazimova; Emily Woodruff

Catherine Glesca Marshall (September 19, 1906 – August 21, 1987) was an American actress and theatrical benefactor who was known primarily as the most enduring lover of Alla Nazimova, silent screen actress and a legend of her time. Glesca met Nazimova when both were cast in a production at the Civic Repertory Theater.

Glesca later lived with Nazimova at the Garden of Allah Hotel on Sunset Boulevard near the Sunset Strip in Hollywood. In the silent film era, the hotel had been an estate that was Nazimova's home. Glesca lived there in a villa on the grounds until Nazimova's death in 1945.

Glesca was also the longtime companion of Emily Woodruff, theatrical benefactor and main patron of the Springer Opera House in Columbus, Georgia. Emily was married to Hume Cronyn, though they never lived together and Emily insisted the marriage remain a secret. Marshall and Woodruff are buried together at Parkhill Cemetery, Columbus, Georgia.
