= Charles Bryant (actor) =

British actor and film director (1879–1948)

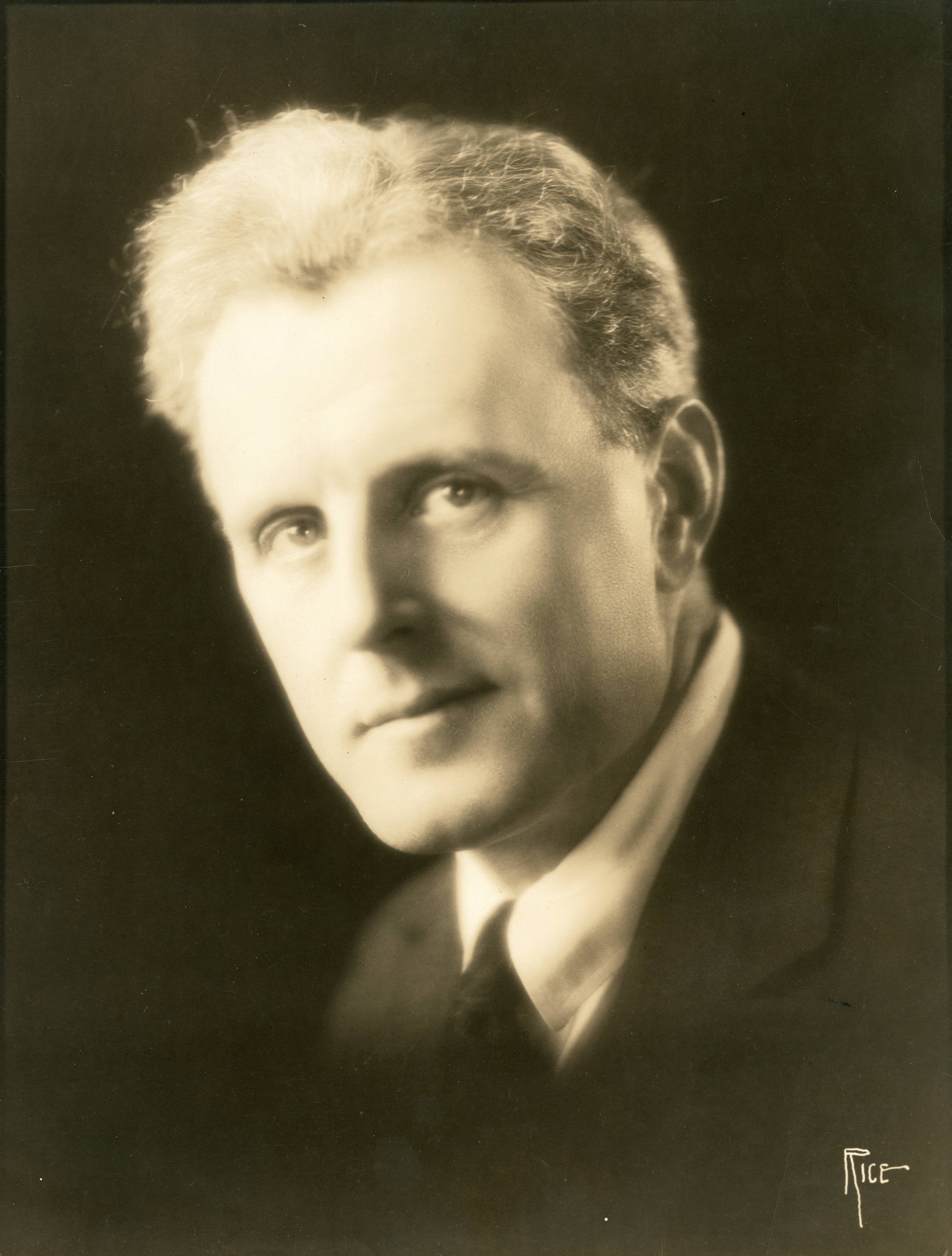
- Bryant in 1922
- Born: 8 January 1879; Hartford, Cheshire, England
- Died: 7 August 1948 (aged 69); Mount Kisco, New York, United States
- Occupations: Actor; film director
- Spouse: Marjorie Gilhooley (m. 1925; div. 1936)
- Partner(s): Alla Nazimova (1912–1925)

Charles Bryant (8 January 1879 – 7 August 1948) was a British actor and film director.

== Life ==
Bryant was born in Hartford, Cheshire, on 8 January 1879. He was educated at Ardingly College in Sussex. He left school at the age of 14 to become a stage actor. Three years later, he traveled to the United States to begin working on Broadway, starring in The First Born in 1897.

Bryant starred in A Train of Incidents (1914) and War Brides (1916). This was the first film of Alla Nazimova. Bryant and Nazimova signed with Metro Pictures in 1918 and starred alongside each other in a number of films, including Revelation, Out of the Fog, and Billions.

In 1918, Nazimova founded Nazimova Productions. It was there that Bryant began directing, with the pair creating a film adaptation of Oscar Wilde’s play Salome in 1923. Bryant and Nazimova's pairing was short-lived. Salomé was notably too far ahead of its time and failed at the box office, bankrupting Nazimova Productions.

Bryant never worked in film again, instead returning to Broadway. He and Nazimova separated shortly after. Their partnership was apparently only one of convenience, as she was lesbian. They no longer thought it necessary.

== Marriages and children ==
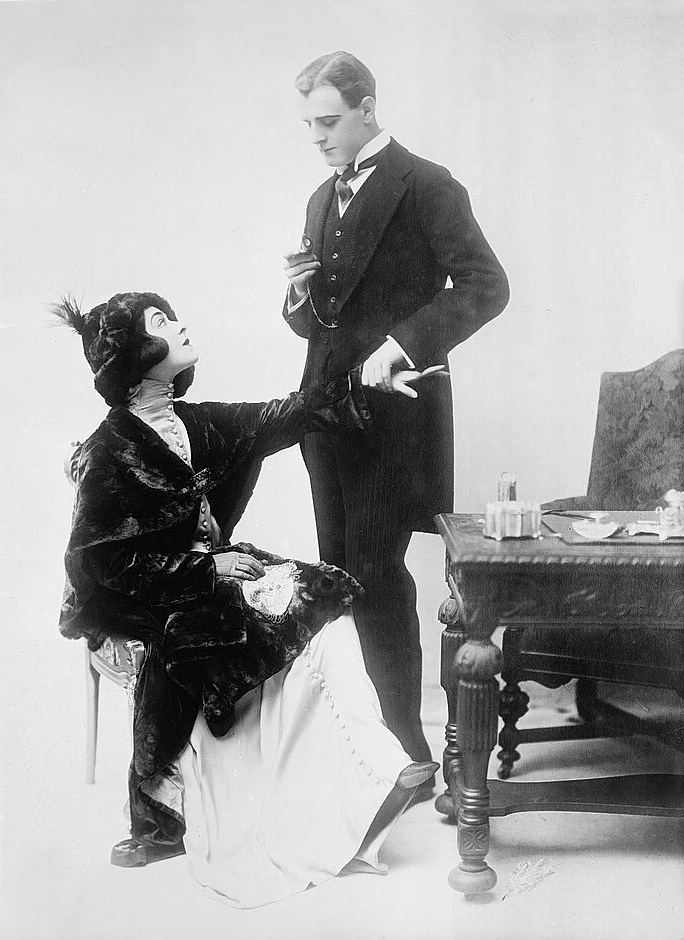
Bryant and Nazimova in 1912

He claimed to have married Alla Nazimova on 5 December 1912, but the marriage never was consummated.

On 16 November 1925, Bryant, 43, surprised the press, Nazimova, and Nazimova's fans by marrying Marjorie Gilhooley, 23, in Connecticut. When the press learned that Bryant had recorded his current marital status as "single" on his marriage licence, the revelation that the marriage between Alla and Charles had been a sham from the beginning embroiled Nazimova in a scandal that damaged her career. Charles and Marjorie divorced in 1936.

Bryant had two children with Gilhooley, Charles Bryant Jr. and Sheila Bryant. On 8 June 1948, Sheila married American novelist Richard Yates.

== Death ==
Bryant died on 7 August 1948 in Mount Kisco, New York at age 69.

== Partial filmography ==
- Eye for Eye (1918)
- Revelation (1918)
- The Red Lantern (1919)
- The Brat (1919)
- Stronger Than Death (1920)
- The Heart of a Child (1920)
- Billions (1920)
- A Doll's House (1922) (directed)
- Salomé (1923) (directed)
