= Face Forward =

- Author: Kevyn Aucoin
- Cover artist: Kevyn Aucoin
- Language: English
- Subject: cosmetics
- Publisher: Little, Brown
- Publication date: October 4, 2000
- Publication place: United States
- Pages: 176
- OCLC: 0316286443
- Preceded by: Making Faces (1999)

Face Forward is a cosmetics book written by Kevyn Aucoin. It was a New York Times bestseller. The book was widely noted for introducing makeup sculpting and contouring to the general public for the first time.

Aucoin's portrait subjects include Julia Roberts, Sharon Stone, Martha Stewart, Tori Amos and Aucoin's own mother. Little, Brown and Company reported a 275,000-copy first printing (compared to 164,000 for his last book, Making Faces), and the publishing company had already ordered three more press runs by the end of the month, for a total of 425,000 copies.

== Promotion ==
A 12-page excerpt from the book ran in the October 2000 issue of InStyle magazine. The same month, Oprah Winfrey devoted a full episode of her chat show to the book and Aucoin appeared on the Today Show.
