= Jed Root =

American businessman

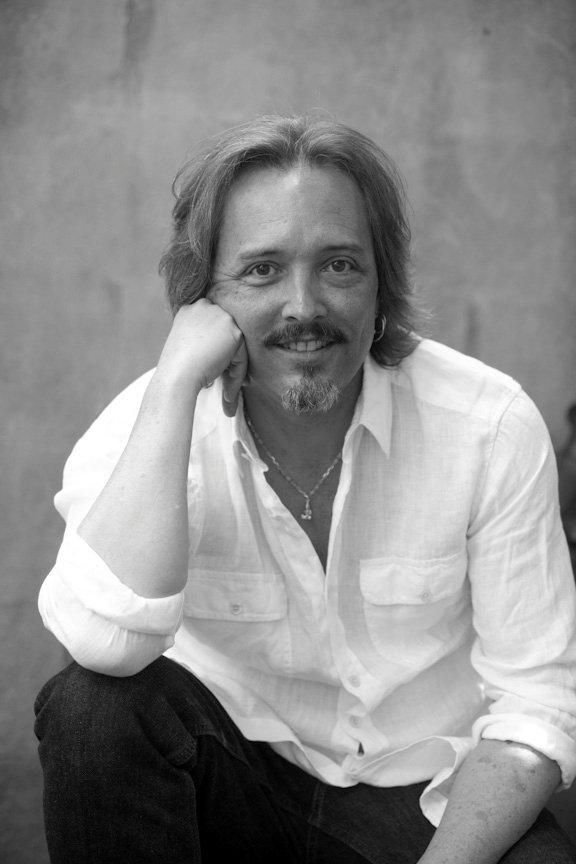
- Occupations: President and Owner of Jed Root, Inc.
- Website: Jed Root

Jed Root is an American businessman, and founder of Jed Root Inc, an artist management agency founded in 1989.

== Early life ==
Root moved to New York City in 1981. He began his career in fashion with temporary jobs as an assistant to hair stylists, makeup artists, and wardrobe stylists. After five years of freelance work, he became an agent for three years at Name Model Management, a boutique modeling agency.

Initially working from his apartment in East Village in 1989, Jed Root, Inc. eventually had over 50 employees and offices in New York, Los Angeles, London, Paris, Tokyo, and Manila representing over 200 individuals.

== History of Global Offices ==
In 1998 he formed an alliance with Chisato Kohno Management of Tokyo as a satellite office. In 2000 he assembled Jed Root Europe in Paris, and in 2006 Jed Root Limited in London. In 2005 he created a syndication department for the license and resale of photography and illustration, and in 2009 added fashion illustrators and prop and set stylists to his roster. In 2010, Root created Root Management, a modeling and talent agency in New York City. Soon after, he opened Jed Root Los Angeles, Inc. in the Luckman Plaza building on Sunset Boulevard, which focuses primarily on hair stylists, make up artists, manicurists, wardrobe stylists, and set designers.
