= Contouring =

Makeup technique

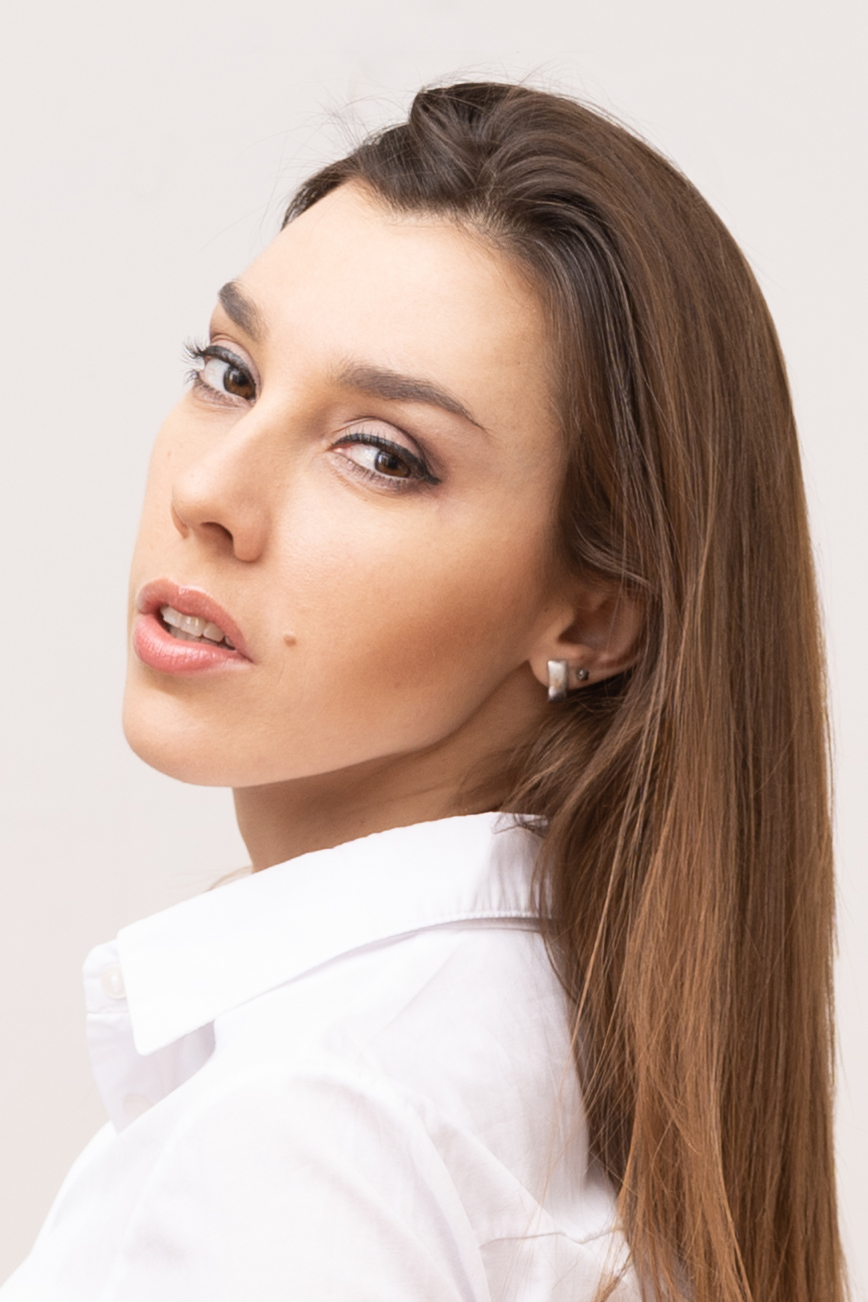
Example of contouring the cheekbone with makeup.

Contouring is a makeup technique that uses cosmetics to define, enhance and sculpt the structure of the face or other body parts, such as breasts.

Contouring is usually produced by placing a warm or cool toned color that is one or two shades darker than the skin color in areas such as in the hollows of the cheeks, on the side of the nose, and on the temples to give a shadow and a slimming effect. It can be complemented with a highlighter that is one or two shades lighter than the skin color on areas of the face that are more prominent such as on the apples of the cheeks and the tip of the nose or the t-zone (forehead, nose, and chin). This technique can also be referred to as strobing, which generally uses only lighter powders and shades and little to no darker ones.

== History ==
In the 16th century, contouring was used by Elizabethan stage actors, who would apply chalk and soot to their faces to help audience members read their facial expressions.

In the late 1800s, when electricity was invented and lights were widely used, soot was no longer an option. Instead of soot, actors would use greasepaint to help audience members decipher their emotions. In 1800s–1900s, Queen Victoria deemed makeup as vulgar, as only stage actors and prostitutes wore makeup. Makeup could only be purchased in costume stores.

In the 1920s and 1930s, contouring could be seen in the film world. German actress Marlene Dietrich would contour her face for her films. She would accentuate the natural lines of her face with shading and sculpting.

In 1934, makeup artist Max Factor Sr. was famous for applying makeup for stage actors. He added shading to the face so that it would not appear flat on film. In 1945, he presented the first tutorial on how to contour the face, for different face shapes.

In 1944, Ben Nye, a famous makeup artist, did the makeup for characters in Gone with the Wind and Planet of the Apes. He then created his own makeup line, which is still popular today.

In the 1950s, a time of Old Hollywood glamour, features were subtly contoured and shaded. This method was used by actresses such as Audrey Hepburn, Marilyn Monroe, and Elizabeth Taylor.

In the 1990s, makeup artist Kevyn Aucoin was wholly responsible for the sculpted, chiseled look of many celebrities and top models, including Cher, Madonna, Gwyneth Paltrow, Cindy Crawford, and Janet Jackson. In October 2000, he published his industry defining cosmetics book, Face Forward, which became a New York Times bestseller. The book was widely noted for introducing makeup sculpting and contouring to the general public for the first time.

In the 2000s, the practice of "body contouring" – the application of contouring to other parts of the body than the face, such as shinbones or breasts ("boob contouring") – became more widely noticed as a result of the increasing number of images of celebrities appearing in social media.

In the 2010s, contouring became even more intense as makeup techniques advanced. While contouring has existed for centuries to some extent, the technique was revolutionized by celebrities, such as Kim Kardashian and makeup artists incorporating it even more into their looks. The trend of contouring has taken over beauty brands by prompting the sale of items meant specifically for contouring and strobing, its lighter counterpart. Contouring developed from only people in the public eye practicing it, to more affordable and accessible brands manufacturing products so all people can use the technique. The practice is often used by drag queens to emphasize feminine features and soften masculine ones. Contouring is used largely to not only accentuate features present on the face, but also to hide or change features that are unwanted. Products often used include powder contour, which can come in palettes with both light and dark colors for highlighting and contouring, as well as cream contour products that can create a more emphasized look.
