= Helen Gilmore (magazine editor) =

American actress and journalist

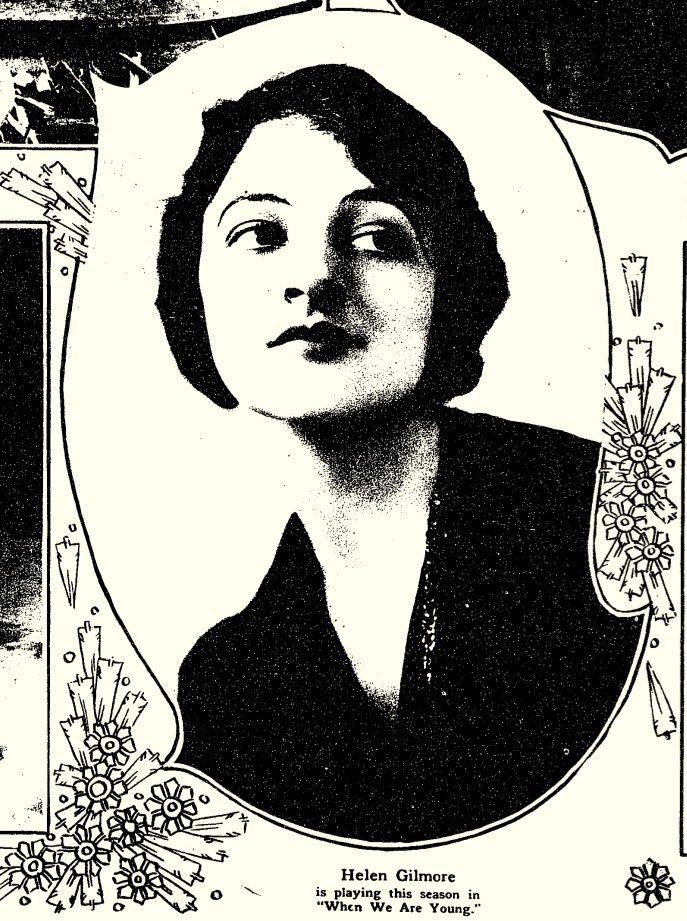
- Gilmore in 1921
- Born: Stella Helen Gilmore; 1900; Chicago, Illinois, U.S.
- Died: October 8, 1947 (aged 47); New York, New York, U.S.
- Occupations: Actress, journalist
- Years active: 1920–1947
- Known for: Editor at Photoplay
- Political party: Democrat
- Spouse: Richard Florac

Stella Helen Gilmore (1900 – October 8, 1947) was an American stage actress, composer, lyricist and magazine editor from Chicago, Illinois.

== Stock company player ==
Gilmore came to New York City in 1917 and studied for a time at Columbia University. On November 22, 1920, she made her acting debut in When We Are Young with Henry Hull. She appeared with the stock company of George Cukor in Providence, Rhode Island. On tour she acted in support of Bette Davis, William Hodge, Spencer Tracy, and other stars.

== Magazine editor ==
Gilmore left the theater in 1933. She became affiliated with Liberty. In 1938 she was appointed editor of Movie Mirror Magazine, a Macfadden publication. She became editor of Photoplay in 1941 after the periodical merged with Movie Mirror. Her career as an editor lasted approximately a decade.

Gilmore died of acute leukemia at Mt. Sinai Hospital, New York in 1947. She was 47 years old.

== Theatre performances ==
Year	Play	Author	Character	Venue or Company	Notes
1920	When We Are Young	Kate L. McLaurin	Marcet Blair	Broadhurst Theatre	November 22, 1920 – ?
1921	A Little Journey			Liberty Theater	May 15, 1921 – May 21, 1921
1923	The Invisible Guest	Victor E. Lambert		The Majestic Theatre	January 8, 1923 – ?
1923	Ladies Must Love	Lajos Bartok		Lyric Theatre	February 23, 1923 – ?
1924	Undercover		"second leading lady"	Alhambra Stock Players	September 15, 1924 – ?
1925	Playthings	Frederic and Fanny Hatton		Wilkes Orange Grove	August 9, 1925 – ?
1926	The Show-Off	George Kelly			July 1926
1928	Yellow	George M. Cohan		Cukor-Kondolf Stock Company	October 29, 1928 – November 3, 1928;
1928	Tommy	Howard Lindsay, Bert Robinson	minor role	Cukor-Kondolf Stock Company	November 5, 1928 – November 10, 1928.
1928	Cock o' the Roost	Rita Johnson Young	minor role	Cukor-Kondolf Stock Company	December 3, 1928 – December 8, 1928.
1928	Queen High	Buddy DeSylva, Lewis Gensler, Laurence Schwab, Edward Peple		Cukor-Kondolf Stock Company	December 10, 1928 – December 15, 1928.
1928	Kongo	Chester De Vonde, Kilbourn Gordon	Ann Whitehall	Cukor-Kondolf Stock Company	December 17, 1928 – December 22, 1928.

== Compositions ==
Except where otherwise noted, all words and music by Stella Helen Gilmore.

- "Honolulu"
- "Syncopated Lullabye"
- "Wy-ree-woo"
- "Swing Me"
- "Inconsistency"
- "Examination Blues"
- "Spanish Infanta"
- "Cause It's You" (w - Sidney Levy)
- "The Gift"
- "I Want to Say"
- "When I Come Riding Home"
- "Where Syringa Trees Blow"
- "Ye Who Have Lifted Your Hearts"
- "My Crossword Puzzle Girl" (as Helen Gilmore; w – Cecil Owen)
