= A. H. Fischer Features =

Film production company

A. H. Fischer Features was a film production company. B. A. Rolfe worked on some of its films. Charles A. Logue was the company's secretary.

The company used a former Thanhouser studio space in New Rochelle, New York. Rolfe also filmed the company's productions in the Adirondacks.

Fischer was from Montreal and the brother of Meyer Fischer.

== Filmography ==
- A Screamin the Night (1919)
- The Red Virgin (1919)
- The Amazing Lovers (1919), based on stories by Robert W. Chambers
- Man and Woman (1920)
- Even as Eve (1920), based on the 1901 novel The Shining Band by Robert W. Chambers
- Man and Woman (1920)
- Miss 139 (1921)
