= Man and Woman (film) =

1920 film

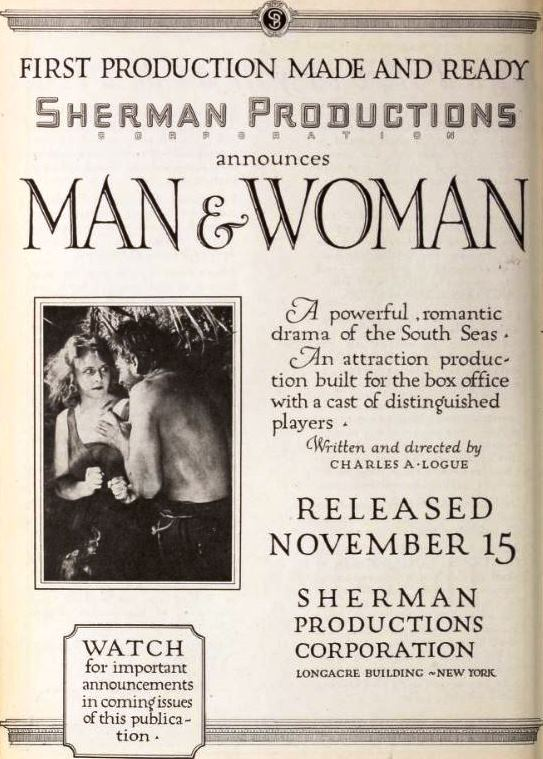
- Advertisement
- Directed by: Charles A. Logue; B.A. Rolfe
- Written by: Charles Logue
- Starring: Diana Allen; Joe King; Eddie Sturgis
- Cinematography: Gene O'Donnell; Conrad Wells
- Production company: A. H. Fischer Features Inc.
- Distributed by: Sherman Productions Corporation
- Release date: November 15, 1920
- Running time: 6 reels
- Country: United States
- Language: Silent (English intertitles)

Man and Woman is a 1920 American silent drama film produced by A. H. Fischer, Inc. The film was directed by Charles A. Logue and B. A. Rolfe. Logue also wrote the story and the screenplay. Gene O'Donnell and Conrad Wells (credited as Abe Fried) served as cinematographers.

== Plot ==
A young Civil engineer builds a bridge that later collapses which causes him to mentally collapse. He retreats to a South Pacific Ocean island and becomes a beachcomber. Later one of his former engineering supervisors comes to the island with his daughter to repair a lighthouse. She bets the local Governor that she can dress up a beach bum to pass as a society swell. She picks the young former engineer. He decides to teach her a lesson and takes her to a leprosy colony where she is "treated like dirt". She learns her lesson and her father gives him a job at the lighthouse.

== Cast ==
- Diana Allen as Diana Murdock
- Joe King as Joe
- Eddie Sturgis as The Flash
- John L. Shine as Greasy
- Tatjana Irrah as The Duchess
- Eleanor Cozzat as The Waif
- G. H. Carlyle as The Beast
- A. C. Milar as Murdock
- Gordon Standing as Bradley
- James Alling as Bishop Graham
- Herbert Standing as Governor-General
- Pat Jennings as The First Mate
- Dorothea Fischer as Perkins
- Pat Fischer as Perkins
- Harry F. Millarde

== Preservation ==
In February of 2021, Man and Woman was cited by the National Film Preservation Board on their Lost U.S. Silent Feature Films list and is therefore presumed lost.
