= The White Raven (1917 film) =

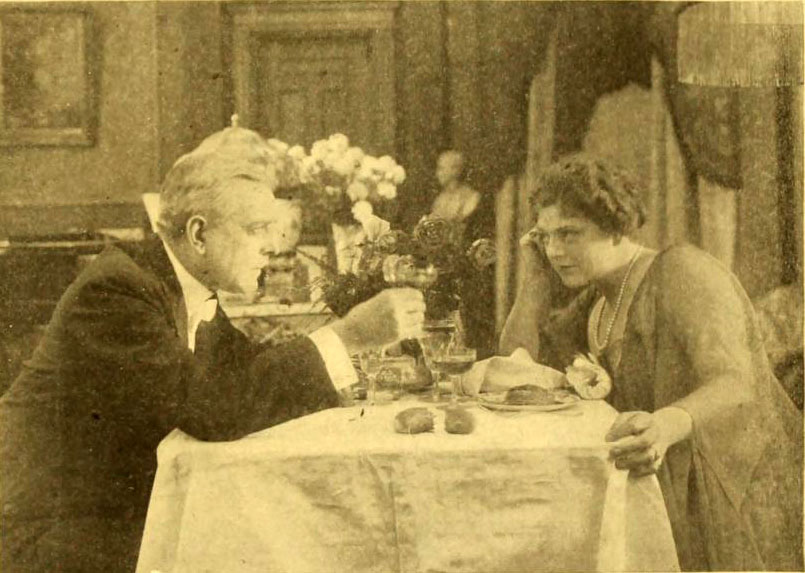
- Directed by: George D. Baker
- Written by: Charles A. Logue (screen story); George D. Baker (scenario)
- Produced by: Rolfe Photoplays
- Cinematography: Arthur Martinelli
- Distributed by: Metro Pictures
- Release date: January 14, 1917
- Running time: 5 reels
- Country: United States
- Language: Silent (English intertitles)

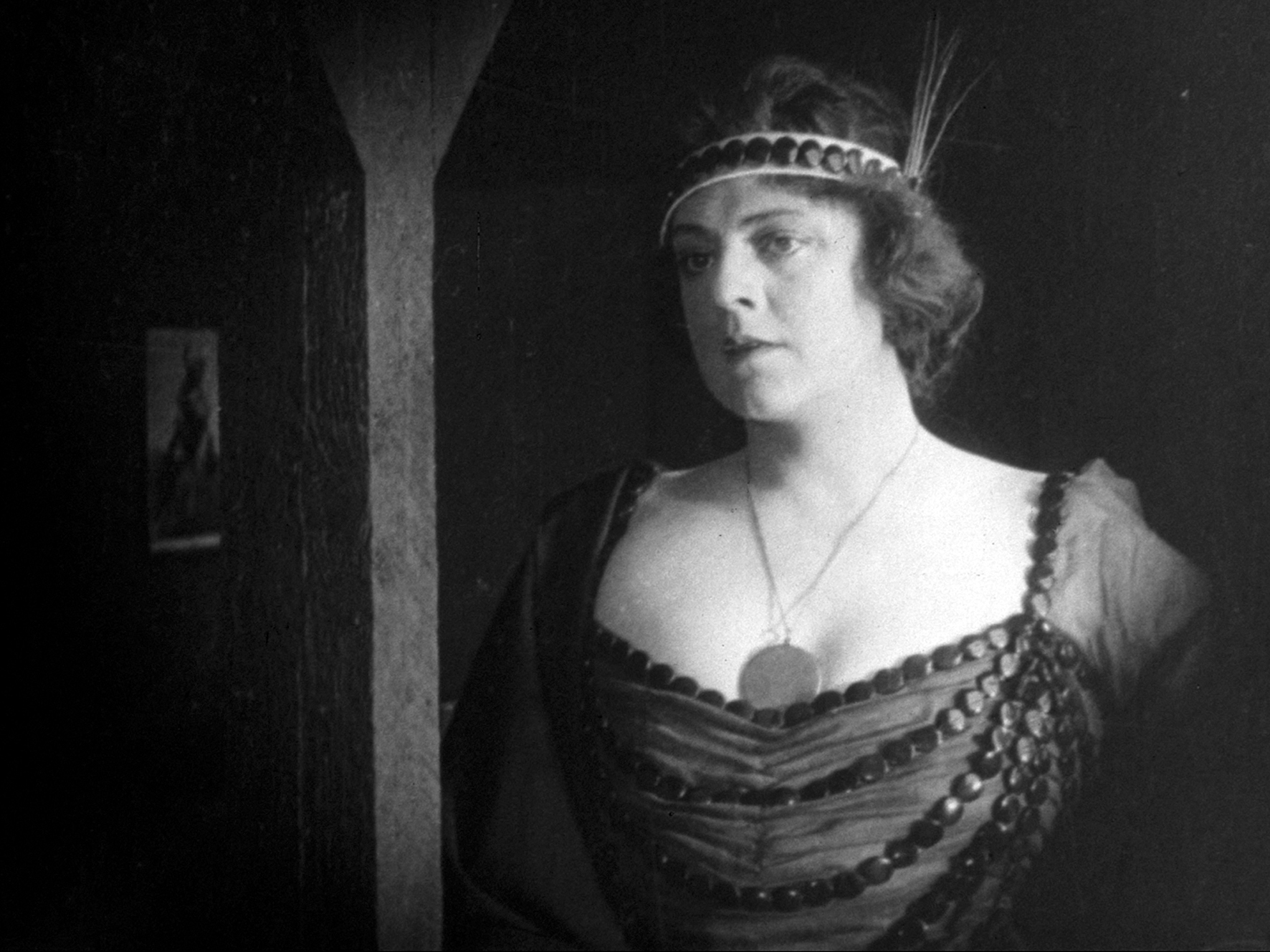
Scene from the film.

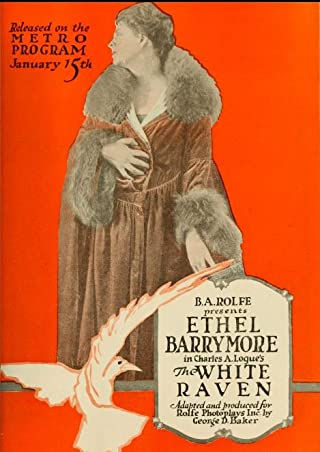

The White Raven is a 1917 American silent drama film produced by B. A. Rolfe's Rolfe Photoplays and distributed by Metro Pictures. This drama stars Ethel Barrymore in an original screen story.

A copy of the film is preserved at George Eastman Museum.

== Cast ==
- Ethel Barrymore - Nan Baldwin
- William B. Davidson - The Stranger
- Walter Hitchcock - John Blaisdell
- George A. Wright - Arthur Smithson
- Viola A. Fortescue - Mrs. Smithson
- Herbert Pattee - 'Bill' Baldwin
- Mario Majeroni - The Opera Impresario
- Phil Sandford - The Dance Hall Proprietor
- Ethel Dayton - Sylvia Blaisdell
- Ned Finlay - The Miner
