= Madonnas and Men =

1920 film directed by B. A. Rolfe

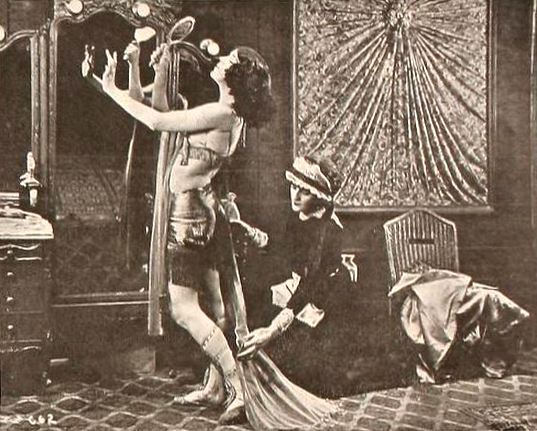
- Directed by: B.A. Rolfe
- Written by: Carey Wilson; Edmund Goulding; Violet Clark
- Starring: Anders Randolf; Edmund Lowe; Gustav von Seyffertitz
- Cinematography: Arthur A. Cadwell
- Edited by: J.J. Kiley
- Production company: Rolfe Photoplays
- Distributed by: Jans Film Service
- Release date: June 1920
- Country: United States
- Languages: Silent; English intertitles

Madonnas and Men is a 1920 American silent drama film directed by B.A. Rolfe and starring Anders Randolf, Edmund Lowe and Gustav von Seyffertitz.

== Cast ==
- Anders Randolf as Turnerius / Marshall Turner
- Edmund Lowe as Gordion / Gordon Turner
- Gustav von Seyffertitz as Grimaldo / John Grimm
- Raye Dean as Laurentia / Laura Grimm
- Evan Burroughs Fontaine as Nerissa / Ninon
- Blanche Davenport as Mrs. Grimm
- Faire Binney as Patsy

== Bibliography ==
- Langman, Larry. American Film Cycles: The Silent Era. Greenwood Publishing, 1998.
