= Miss 139 =

1921 film

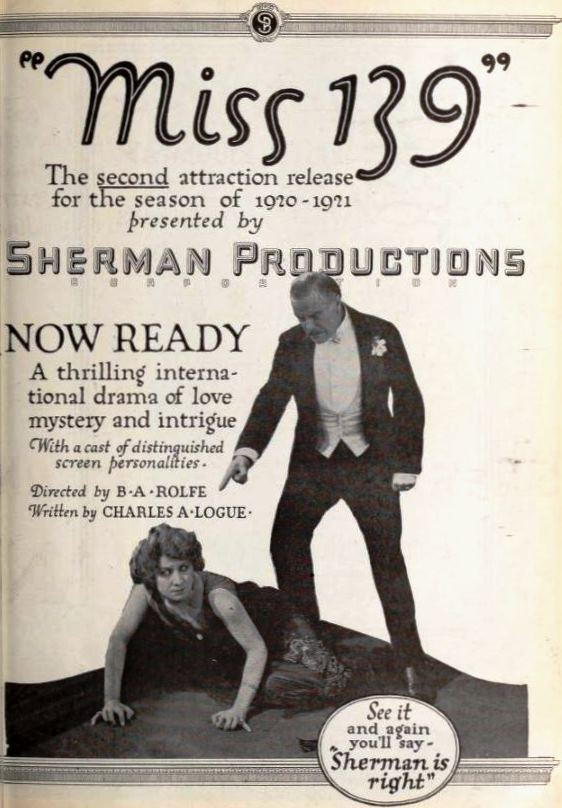
- Film poster
- Directed by: B. A. Rolfe
- Written by: Charles Logue
- Produced by: A. H. Fischer
- Starring: Diana Allen; Marc McDermott; Eugene Strong
- Production companies: A. H. Fischer, Inc.
- Distributed by: Jans Film Service, Sherman Productions Corporation
- Release date: September 15, 1921
- Running time: 5 reels
- Country: United States
- Language: Silent (English intertitles)

Miss 139 is a 1921 American silent crime drama film produced by A. H. Fischer and distributed by Jans Film Service and Sherman Productions Corporation. B. A. Rolfe was the director and Charles A. Logue wrote the story and the screenplay. Its Swedish-born star Diana Allen had been a Ziegfeld girl.

The film is now lost.

== Cast ==
- Diana Allen as Yvonne La Rue
- Marc McDermott as Professor John Breede
- Eugene Strong as Captain Marlowe
- E. J. Ratcliffe as Martin Cardine
- Tatjana Irrah as The squirrel
- Sally Crute as Vera Cardine
- John L. Shine as Professor Apollo Cawber
- Gordon Standing as La Gendre
- James Ryan as Operative

== Production ==
Likely finished in 1920 but not released until the next year, the film was retitled as Amazing Lovers for its 1921 release.
