= Dorian's Divorce =

1916 film by Oscar A. C. Lund

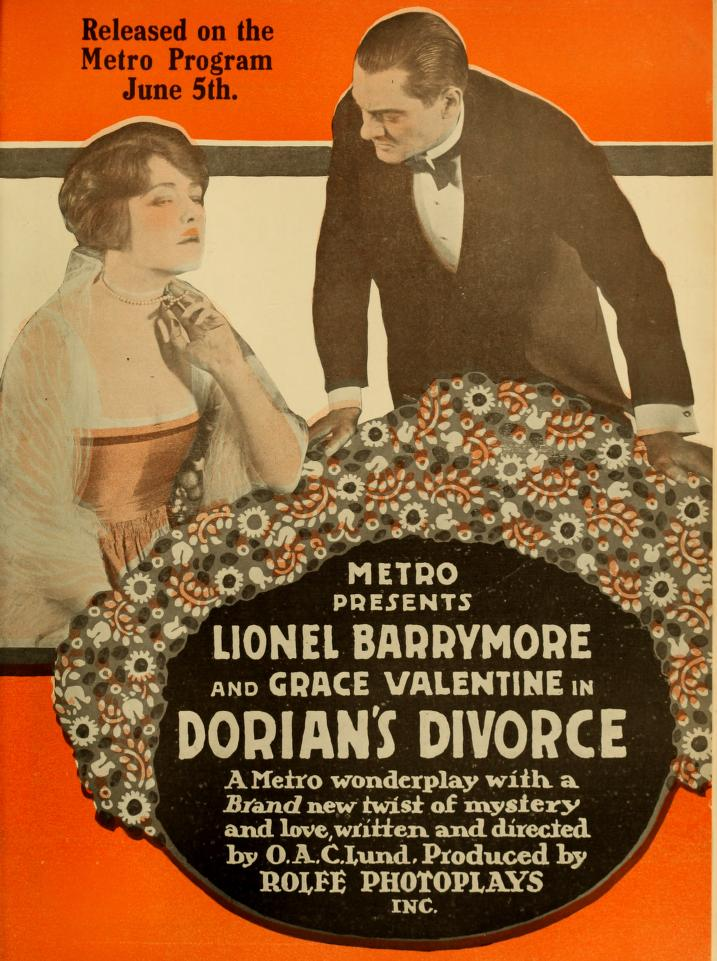
- Lobby poster
- Directed by: O. A. C. Lund
- Written by: O. A. C. Lund
- Produced by: B. A. Rolfe
- Starring: Lionel Barrymore; Grace Valentine
- Cinematography: William Wagner
- Production company: Rolfe Photoplays
- Distributed by: Metro Pictures
- Release date: June 5, 1916
- Running time: 5 reels
- Country: United States
- Language: Silent (English intertitles)

Dorian's Divorce is a 1916 American silent drama film directed by O. A. C. Lund and starring Lionel Barrymore and Grace Valentine. B. A. Rolfe produced for distribution through Metro Pictures.

== Cast ==
- Lionel Barrymore as Richard Dorian
- Grace Valentine as Mrs. Dorian
- Edgar L. Davenport as Theodore Sanders
- William B. Davidson as (credited as William Davidson)
- Louis Wolheim as Captain Ross (credited as L. Robert Wolheim)
- Lindsay J. Hall as B. G. Holding
- Bert Starkey as Puck (credited as Buckley Starkey
- John Leach
- Jerome N. Wilson (credited as Jerome Wilson)

== Preservation status ==
The film is preserved Cinémathèque française.
