= The Master Mystery =

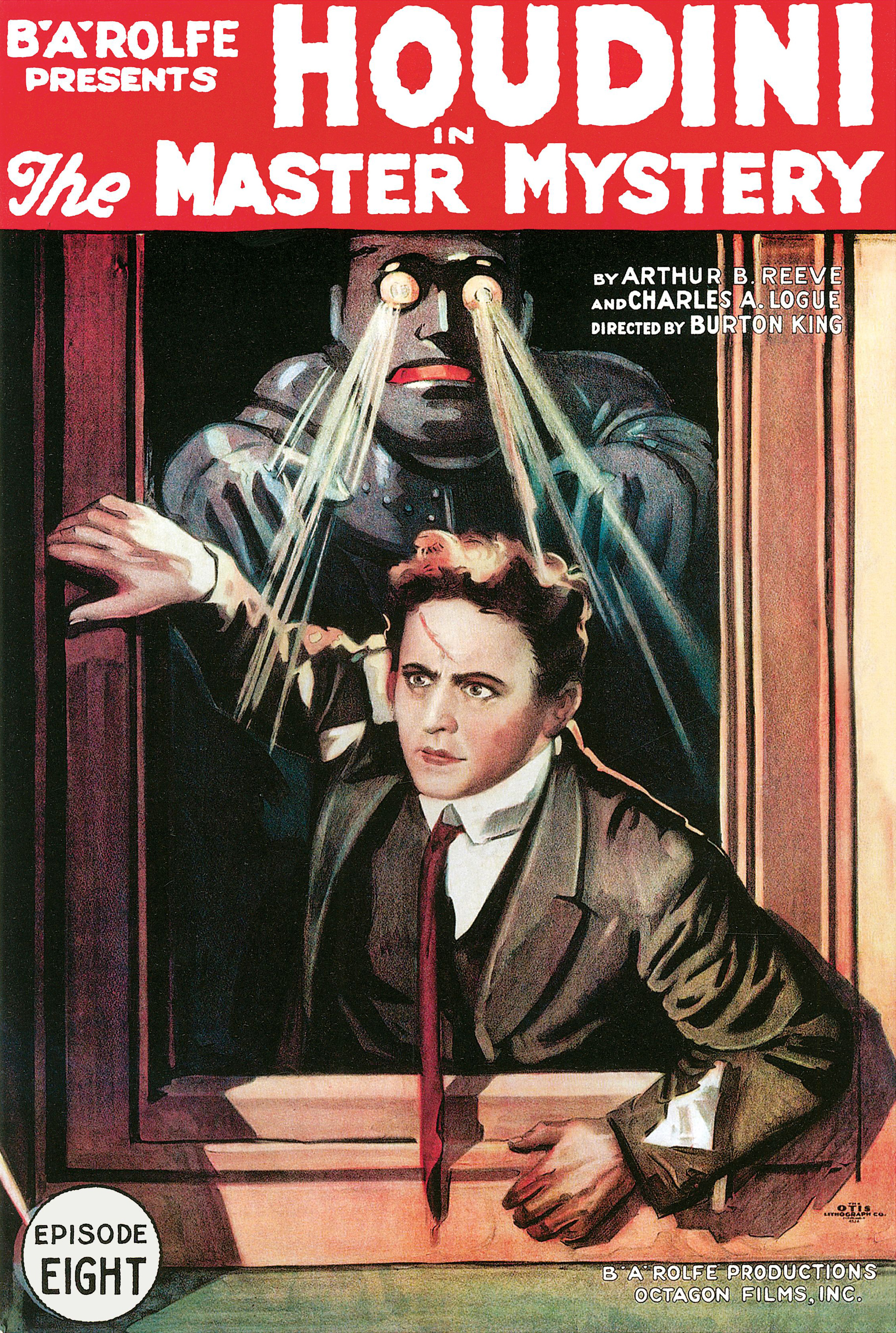
- Episode eight poster
- Directed by: Harry Grossman; Burton L. King
- Screenplay by: Arthur B. Reeve; Charles Logue
- Produced by: B. A. Rolfe
- Starring: Harry Houdini; Marguerite Marsh; Ruth Stonehouse; Edna Britton; William Pike; Charles Graham
- Music by: Michael Mortilla
- Production company: Rolfe Photoplays
- Distributed by: Octagon Films
- Release date: November 18, 1918
- Country: United States
- Language: Silent (English intertitles)

The Master Mystery is a 1918 American mystery silent serial film told in 15 installments. The film was directed by Harry Grossman and Burton L. King and written by Arthur B. Reeve and Charles Logue. The film stars Harry Houdini, Marguerite Marsh, Ruth Stonehouse, Edna Britton, William Pike, and Charles Graham. Episode 1 was released on November 18, 1918, by Octagon Films.

== Plot ==
Justice Department agent Quentin Locke is investigating a powerful cartel that is protected by The Automaton, a robot. However, it uses a gas weapon known as The Madagascan Madness.

== Cast ==
- Harry Houdini as Quentin Locke
- Marguerite Marsh as Eva Brent
- Ruth Stonehouse as Zita Dane
- Edna Britton as De Luxe Dora
- William Pike as Paul Balcom
- Charles Graham as Herbert Balcom
- Floyd Buckley as Q the Automaton
- Jack Burns as Peter Brent

== Episodes ==
1. Living Death
2. The Iron Terror
3. The Water Peril
4. The Test
5. The Chemist’s Shop
6. The Mad Genius
7. Barbed Wire
8. The Challenge
9. The Madagascan Madness
10. The Binding Ring
11. The Net
12. The Death Noose
13. The Flash of Death
14. The Tangled Web
15. Bound at Last; or, Unmasking of the Automaton

== Production and Reception ==
In October 1919, Houdini sued the Octagon Film Corporation, Grossman, and Rolfe for a share of the film's profits. In 1922, Houdini was awarded $32,795.18.
