= The Three of Us =

The Three of Us may refer to:

- The Three of Us, a 1906 play by Rachel Crothers
  - The Three of Us (1914 film), an American silent film directed by John W. Noble, based on Crothers' play
- The Three of Us (1940 film), a Swedish film directed by Schamyl Bauman
- The Three of Us (1984 film), an Italian film directed by Pupi Avati
- The Three of Us (2015 film) or All Three of Us, a French film directed by Kheiron

== See also ==
- Three of Us
