= A Woman's Business =

1920 silent film

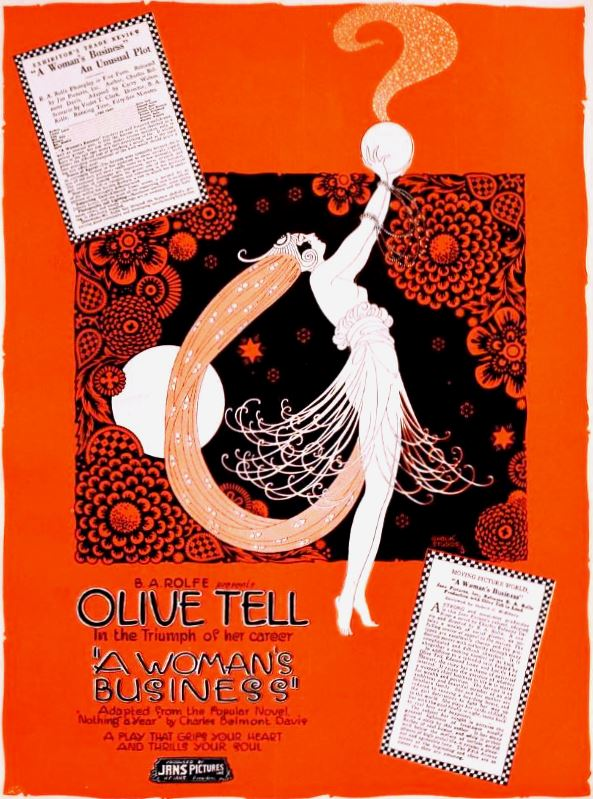
- Directed by: B. A. Rolfe
- Written by: Charles Belmont Davis (novel); Violet Clark; Carey Wilson
- Produced by: B. A. Rolfe
- Starring: Olive Tell; Edmund Lowe; Donald Hall
- Cinematography: Arthur A. Cadwell
- Production company: Rolfe Photoplays
- Distributed by: Jans Film Service
- Release date: June 1, 1920
- Running time: 50 minutes
- Country: United States
- Languages: Silent; English intertitles

A Woman's Business is a 1920 American silent drama film directed by B.A. Rolfe and starring Olive Tell, Edmund Lowe and Donald Hall.

== Cast ==
- Olive Tell as Barbara
- Edmund Lowe as Johnny Lister
- Donald Hall as Ellis
- Lucille Lee Stewart as Mrs. Ellis
- Warner Richmond as Brookes
- Annette Bade as Mrs. Brookes
- Stanley Walpole as David

== Bibliography ==
- Goble, Alan. The Complete Index to Literary Sources in Film. Walter de Gruyter, 1999.
