= Chester M. De Vonde =

American actor and director

Chester M. De Vonde (October 7, 1872 - January 10, 1928) was an actor, writer, and director of theatrical productions and films.

He wrote the play A Widow's Son. It was described as a Masonic passion play.

== Filmography ==
- Cinderella Husband (1917), director
- Adam and Some Eves (1918), director
- Even as Eve (1920), co-directed with B. A. Rolfe
- Voices (1920), wrote and directed
- West of Zanzibar (1928), wrote play film was adapted from
- Kongo (1932), wrote play film was adapted from
