= A Wife by Proxy =

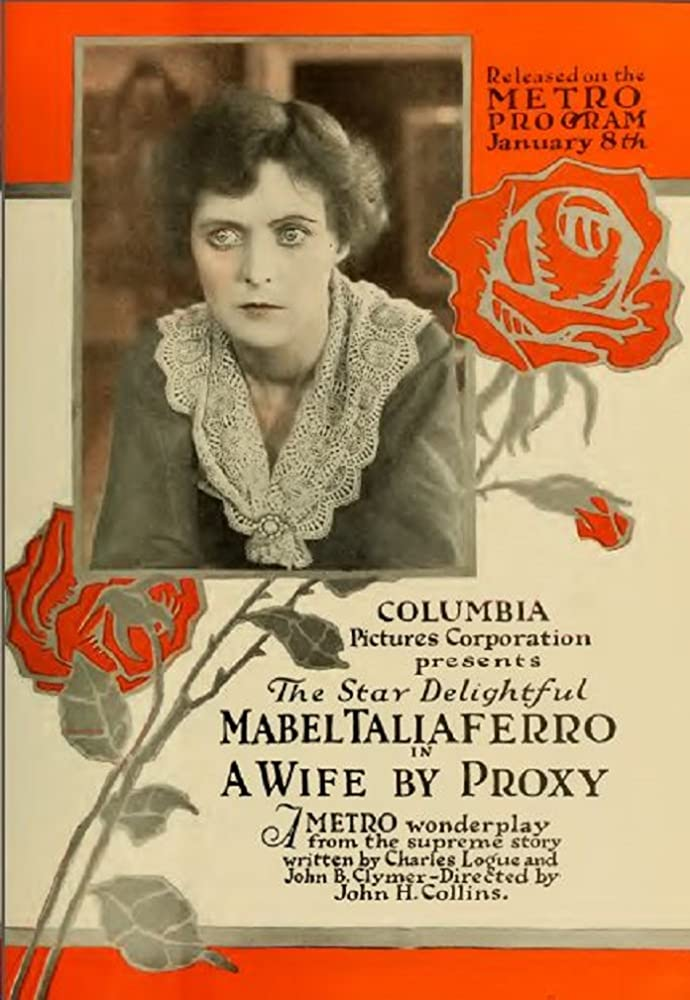
- Directed by: John H. Collins
- Written by: John H. Collins; Charles A. Logue; June Mathis
- Starring: Mabel Taliaferro; Robert Walker; Sally Crute
- Cinematography: Arthur A. Cadwell
- Production company: Columbia Pictures
- Distributed by: Metro Pictures
- Release date: January 6, 1917
- Running time: 50 minutes
- Country: United States
- Languages: Silent; English intertitles

A Wife by Proxy is a 1917 American silent drama film directed by John H. Collins and starring Mabel Taliaferro, Robert Walker and Sally Crute.

== Cast ==
- Mabel Taliaferro as 'Jerry' McNairn
- Robert Walker as Norton Burbeck
- Sally Crute as Beatrice Gaden
- Fred Jones as Frederick Gaden
- Yale Benner as Howard Curtis
- George D. Melville as Timothy McNairn
- Ricca Allen as Scraggs (housekeeper)
- Jerome N. Wilson as Guyler (Burbeck's lawyer)
- Edward Mack as Flynn (the butler)

== Bibliography ==
- Lowe, Denise. An Encyclopedic Dictionary of Women in Early American Films: 1895-1930. Routledge, 2014.
