= The Garter Girl =

1920 silent film

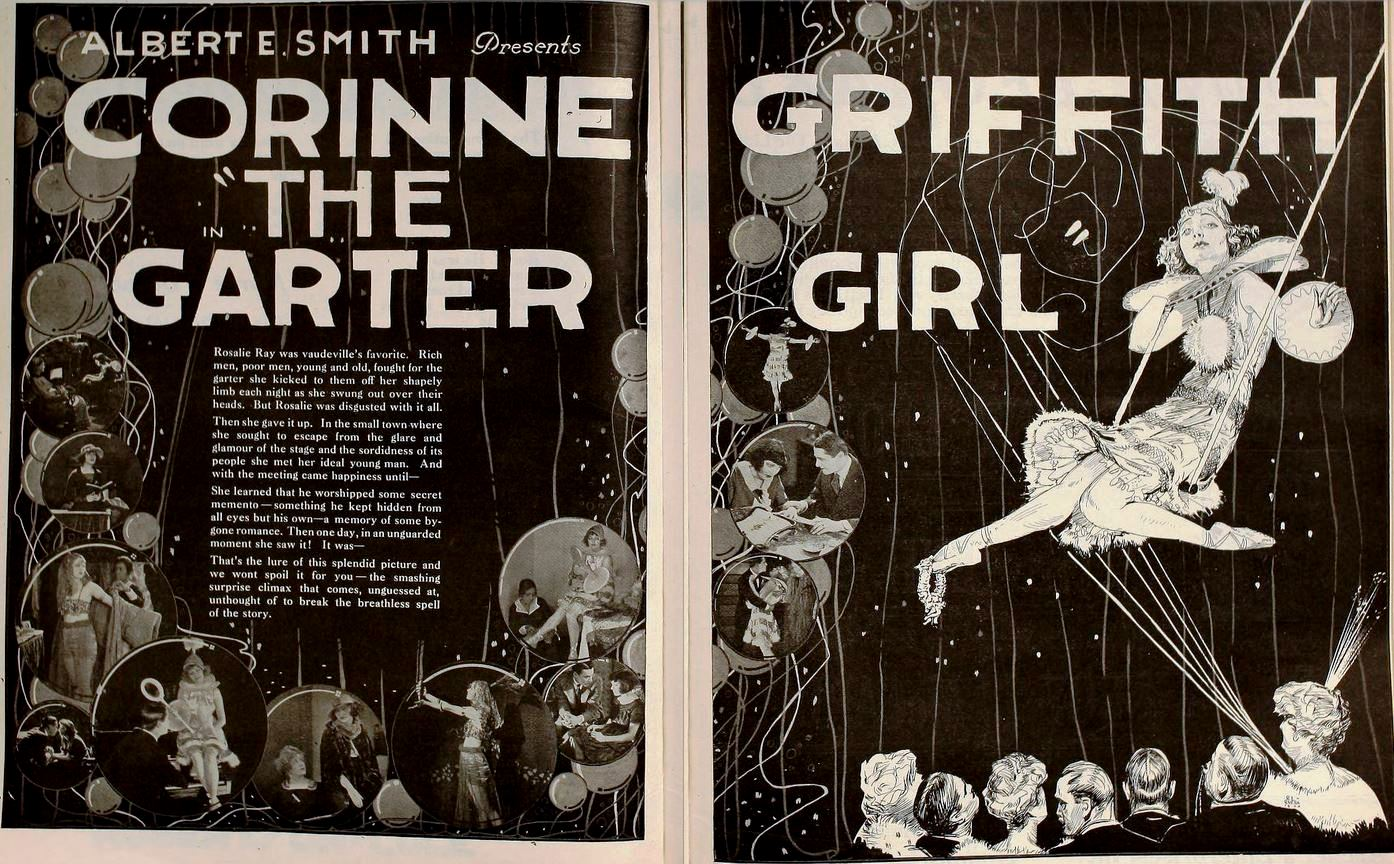
- Directed by: Edward H. Griffith
- Written by: O. Henry (story); William B. Courtney; Lucien Hubbard
- Produced by: Albert E. Smith
- Starring: Corinne Griffith; Sally Crute; Earl Metcalfe
- Production company: Vitagraph Company of America
- Distributed by: Vitagraph Company of America
- Release date: May 1920
- Running time: 50 minutes
- Country: United States
- Languages: Silent; English intertitles

The Garter Girl is a 1920 American silent drama film directed by Edward H. Griffith and starring Corinne Griffith, Sally Crute and Earl Metcalfe. Some scenes for the film were shot on location at the Irving Place Theatre in New York City and in Saugerties, NY.

== Cast ==
- Corinne Griffith as Rosalie Ray
- Sally Crute as Lynette
- Earl Metcalfe as Brad Mortimer
- Rod La Rocque as Arthur Lyle
- James Tarbell

== Preservation ==
The Garter Girl is currently presumed lost. In February of 2021, the film was cited by the National Film Preservation Board on their Lost U.S. Silent Feature Films list.

== Bibliography ==
- Langman, Larry. American Film Cycles: The Silent Era. Greenwood Publishing, 1998.
