= The Inner Man =

1922 silent film

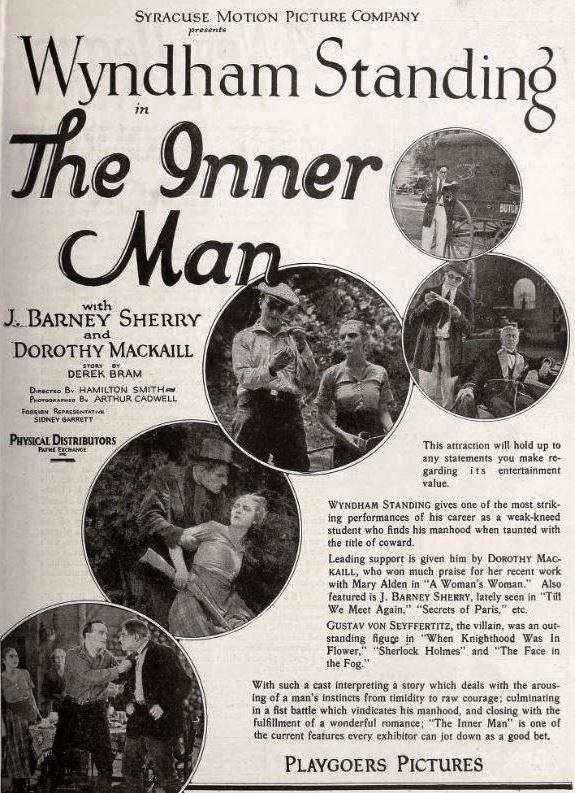
- Directed by: Hamilton Smith
- Written by: Charles Mackay
- Starring: Wyndham Standing; J. Barney Sherry; Dorothy Mackaill
- Cinematography: Arthur A. Cadwell
- Production company: Syracuse Motion Pictures Company
- Distributed by: Playgoers Pictures
- Release date: December 3, 1922
- Running time: 50 minutes
- Country: United States
- Languages: Silent; English intertitles

The Inner Man is a 1922 American silent comedy film directed by Hamilton Smith and starring Wyndham Standing, J. Barney Sherry and Dorothy Mackaill.

== Cast ==
- Wyndham Standing as Thurlow Michael Barclay Jr
- J. Barney Sherry as Thurlow Michael Barclay Sr
- Louis Pierce as Old Man Wolf
- Leslie Hunt as Bob
- Dorothy Mackaill as Sally
- Gustav von Seyffertitz as Jud Benson
- Arthur Dewey as Randall
- Martin Kinney as Ned Sawyer
- Kathryn Kingsley as Margaret Barclay
- Nellie Parker Spaulding as Mrs. Wolf
- Arthur Cadwell Jr. as Ben Wolf

== Bibliography ==
- Munden, Kenneth White. The American Film Institute Catalog of Motion Pictures Produced in the United States, Part 1. University of California Press, 1997.
