= Three of Us =

Three of Us may refer to:

- Three of Us (film), a 2023 Indian film
- 3 of Us, a 2023 EP by Flo
- "Three of Us", a 2014 song by Toy from Da Capo

== See also ==
- The Three of Us
