= The Three of Us (1914 film) =

1914 silent American film directed by John Willock Noble

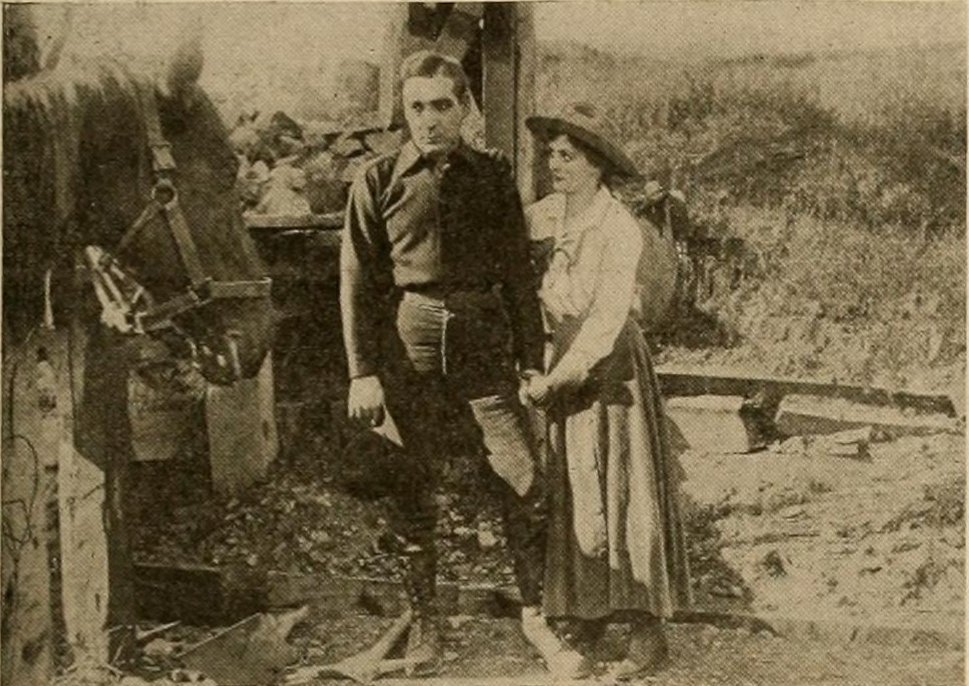
- Directed by: John W. Noble
- Based on: the play, The Three of Us by Rachel Crothers
- Produced by: B. A. Rolfe
- Starring: Mabel Taliaferro; Creighton Hale; Master Stuart
- Cinematography: H. O. Carleton
- Production company: B. A Rolfe Photo Plays
- Distributed by: Alco Film Corp.
- Release date: December 14, 1914 (US)
- Running time: 5 reels
- Country: United States
- Language: English

The Three of Us is a lost 1914 American silent drama film directed by John W. Noble, produced by B. A. Rolfe, and starring Mabel Taliaferro and Creighton Hale. It was based on a 1906 play The Three of Us by Rachel Crothers. The films was released in 5 parts.

== Plot ==
According to a film magazine, "Rhy MacGhesney and her two brothers, Clem and Sonnie, live with their father and servant, Maggie, in a small boom mining town in Colorado. The boom has passed to the camps further on. leaving their little camp practically deserted. Rhy still has faith in the claim her father worked up to the time he was killed, some five years before, but her brother hates the life of the camp, and wants to sell for what they can get and go back to New York, where he feels he can have a chance to make something of himself. Their neighbor across the street is Lewis Beresford, whose obvious mission in the camp is one of pleasure, but who is in reality a mining expert, connected with big mining interests. He has ingratiated himself into the affection of the people of this little camp, and shows a great liking for Rhy and her brothers. Steve Towney, the former mine superintendent for "The Three of Us,' is in love with Rhy and is jealous of Beresford, as he has been accepted as suitor for Rhy's hand, up to the time of Beresford's coming.

Mr. and Mrs. Bix, Rhy's closest friends in the camp, give a Hallowe'en dinner, which is to be the biggest event of the year. On the day that the dinner is to be given, Steven strikes, by accident, mineral. This assures the success of the mine on which he holds an option, and which adjoins "The Three of Us." Overjoyed, he rushes to Rhy to tell the good news, informing her it will be impossible for him to attend the Bix dinner, as his option expires the next day at noon. Rhy confesses her love for him, and asks him to wait until next morning. She will then go with him. He consents, giving her the option and samples of ore. Clem overhears the conversation. He is bribed by Beresford to reveal it. The latter thus has an opportunity to make an attempt to gain possession of the mine. He is at the recording office waiting to establish a claim the moment that the option to Towney's mine expires. But Rhy saves the mine and proves her loyalty to Steve by a thrilling ride over the mountains. This is shown in a series of exciting pictures. A great explosion for the breaking of ground for a smelter for the two successful mines ends the picture."

== Cast ==
- Mabel Taliaferro - Rhy MacChesney
- Creighton Hale - Clem
- Master Stuart - Sonny
- Edwin Carewe - Steve Towney
- Irving Cummings - Louis Beresford
- Madame Claire - Maggie
- Mayme Kelso - Mrs. Bix
- Harry Smith - Mr. Bix

== Reception ==
Moving Picture World reviewer Hanford C. Judson gave the film a positive review, saying it was "well conducted in all its vigorously alive scenes, ably conducted in its love story scenes, and acceptably conducted in those scenes in which the background characters appear."

== Preservation ==
With no holdings located in archives, The Three of Us is considered a lost film.
