= Gustav von Seyffertitz =

German actor (1862–1943)

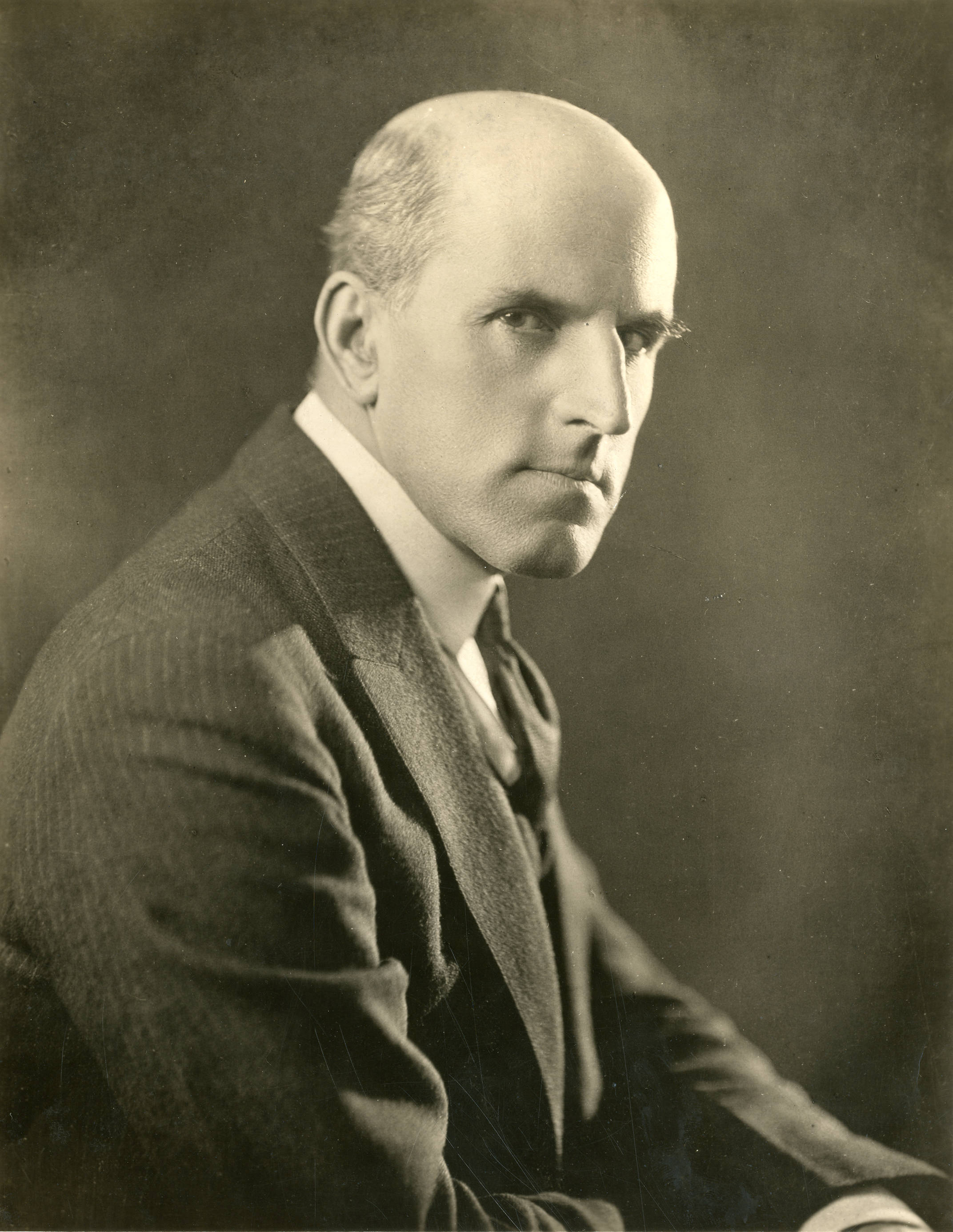
- Seyffertitz in 1922
- Born: Gustav Carl Viktor Bodo Maria von Seyffertitz; 4 August 1862; Haimhausen, Kingdom of Bavaria, German Confederation
- Died: 25 December 1943 (aged 81); Los Angeles, California, United States
- Occupation: Actor
- Years active: ca. 1880–1939
- Spouse(s): Katharina Hoffmann (1886); Toni Creutzburg (1894); Frieda; Eugenie von Mink; Nelly Thorne
- Children: Wilhelm (1882); Joan Goodridge

Gustav von Seyffertitz (4 August 1862 – 25 December 1943) was a German film actor and director. He settled in the United States. He was born in Haimhausen, Bavaria, and died in Los Angeles, California, aged 81.

== Biography ==
Gustav von Seyffertitz was born into an aristocratic family as the son of Guido Freiherr von Seyffertitz and his wife Anna Gräfin von Butler Clonebough zu Haimhausen. His family expected him to start a military career, but was shocked when he said that he wanted to be an actor. He was a member of the Meiningen Court Theatre and also appeared in operas. He emigrated to the United States in 1896, after being asked by the Austrian-American theatre director Heinrich Conried. Despite his thick German accent, he was successful on Broadway where he worked as a stage actor and director during the 1900s and 1910s. He appeared as an actor in such lavish productions as The Brass Bottle in 1910. This play was turned into several films and was the idea for the television show I Dream of Jeannie in the 1960s. He made his film debut in 1917, appearing with Douglas Fairbanks in Down to Earth.

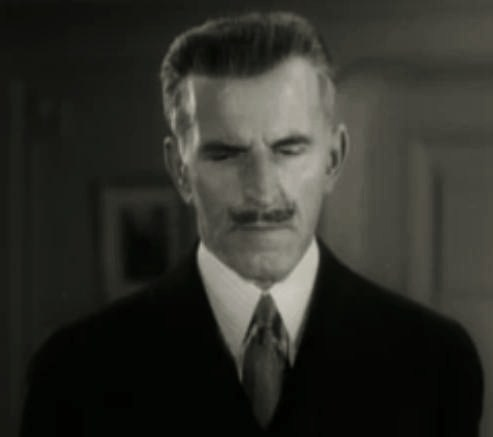
Seyffertitz in Mystery Liner (1934)

In his films, the dignified-looking Seyffertitz often played the "very embodiment of the Hideous Hun - America's notion of the merciless, atrocity-happy German military officer". One of his most successful film roles was Professor Moriarty in 1922's Sherlock Holmes with John Barrymore. He also played the antagonist to Mary Pickford in Sparrows (1926) and appeared as Ramon Novarro's uncle, the king of a small German state, in Ernst Lubitsch's The Student Prince in Old Heidelberg (1927). He continued his career into the sound film and portrayed supporting roles in the Josef von Sternberg-Marlene Dietrich films Dishonored (1931) and Shanghai Express (1932). Among his later film roles was a parody on Sigmund Freud in Frank Capra's film classic Mr. Deeds Goes to Town (1936). He appeared in 118 films between 1917 and 1939.

Seyffertitz was married five times and had numerous children.

== Filmography ==
=== As actor ===
- Down to Earth (1917) as Dr. Jollyem
- The Countess Charming (1917) as Jacob Vandergraft
- The Little Princess (1917) as Mr. Carrisford
- The Devil-Stone (1917) as Stephen Densmore
- Stella Maris (1918) as The Surgeon (uncredited)
- Rimrock Jones (1918) as Stoddard
- The Widow's Might (1918) as Horace Hammer
- The Hidden Pearls (1918) as Senator Joseph Benton
- Amarilly of Clothes-Line Alley (1918) as Surgeon (uncredited)
- The Whispering Chorus (1918) as Mocking face
- His Majesty, Bunker Bean (1918) as Professor Balthasar
- Mr. Fix-It (1918) as Doctor (uncredited)
- Old Wives for New (1918) as Melville Bladen
- To Hell with the Kaiser! (1918)
- Less Than Kin (1918) as Endicott Lee
- Till I Come Back to You (1918) as Karl von Drutz
- The Source (1918) as Ekstrom
- Sic 'Em, Sam (1918, Short)
- Swat the Kaiser (1918, Short) as The Kaiser
- The Roaring Road (1919) as Minor Role (uncredited)
- The Dark Star (1919) as German Spy
- The Vengeance of Durand (1919) as Henri Durand
- Even as Eve (1920) as Amasu Munn
- Slaves of Pride (1920) as John Reynolds
- The Sporting Duchess (1920) as Major Roland Mostyn
- Madonnas and Men (1920) as Grimaldo / John Grimm
- Dead Men Tell No Tales (1920) as Señor Joaquin
- Sherlock Holmes (1922) as Professor Moriarty
- When Knighthood Was in Flower (1922) as Grammont
- The Face in the Fog (1922) as Michael
- The Inner Man (1922) as Jud Benson
- Mark of the Beast (1923) as John Hunter
- Unseeing Eyes (1923) as Father Paquette
- Under the Red Robe (1923) as Clom
- Yolanda (1924) as Oliver de Daim
- The Lone Wolf (1924) as Wetheimer
- The Bandolero (1924) as Marques de Bazan
- The Hooded Falcon (1924)
- Grounds for Divorce (1925) as Labell
- The Goose Woman (1925) as Mr. Vogel
- A Regular Fellow (1925) as Prime Minister
- Flower of Night (1925) as Vigilante leader
- The Eagle (1925) as Court Servant at Dinner (uncredited)
- The Danger Girl (1926) as James
- Red Dice (1926) as Andrew North
- Sparrows (1926) as Mr. Grimes
- The Dice Woman (1926) as Datto of Mandat
- The Bells (1926) as Jerome Frantz
- Don Juan (1926) as Neri the alchemist (uncredited)
- The Lone Wolf Returns (1926) as Morphew
- Unknown Treasures (1926) as Simmons
- Diplomacy (1926) as Baron Ballin
- My Official Wife (1926) as Grand Duke
- Private Izzy Murphy (1926) as Cohannigan
- Going Crooked (1926) as Mordaunt
- Anything Once! (1927, Short) as Chancellor Gherkin
- The Price of Honor (1927) as Peter Fielding
- Birds of Prey (1927) as Foxy
- Barbed Wire (1927) as Pierre Corlet
- The Magic Flame (1927) as The Chancellor
- The Student Prince in Old Heidelberg (1927) as King Karl VII
- Rose of the Golden West (1927) as Gomez
- The Gaucho (1927) as Ruiz the usurper
- The Wizard (1927) as Prof. Paul Coriolos
- The Little Shepherd of Kingdom Come (1928) as Nathan Cherry
- Vamping Venus (1928) as Jupiter
- Yellow Lily (1928) as Kinkelin
- The Mysterious Lady (1928) as General Boris Alexandroff
- The Red Mark (1928) as De Nou
- The Docks of New York (1928) as "Hymn Book" Harry
- The Woman Disputed (1928) as Otto Krueger
- Me, Gangster (1928) as Factory Owner
- The Case of Lena Smith (1929) as Herr Hofrat
- The Canary Murder Case (1929) as Dr. Ambrose Lindquist
- Come Across (1929) as Pop Hanson
- Chasing Through Europe (1929) as Phineas Merrill
- His Glorious Night (1929) as Krehl
- Seven Faces (1929) as M. Pratouchy
- Dangerous Paradise (1930) as Mr. Jones
- The Case of Sergeant Grischa (1930) as General Schieffenzahn
- The Bat Whispers (1930) as Dr Venrees
- Are You There? (1930) as Barber
- Dishonored (1931) as Austrian Secret Service Chief
- The Front Page (1931) as Professor Max J. Engelhoffer (uncredited)
- Ambassador Bill (1931) as Prince de Polikoff
- Safe in Hell (1931) as Larson
- Shanghai Express (1932) as Eric Baum
- The Roadhouse Murder (1932) as Charles Spengler
- Doomed Battalion (1932) as Austrian General
- Almost Married (1932) as Pringle's Doctor
- Afraid to Talk (1932) as Attorney Harry Berger
- The Penguin Pool Murder (1932) as Von Donnen / Dr Max Bloom
- Rasputin and the Empress (1932) as Dr. Franz Wolfe (uncredited)
- The Silver Cord (1932) as German Doctor (uncredited)
- When Strangers Marry (1933) as Van Wyck
- Captured! (1933) as German Military Judge (uncredited)
- Queen Christina (1933) as General
- Mystery Liner (1934) as Inspector Von Kessling
- All Men Are Enemies (1934) as Baron (uncredited)
- Change of Heart (1934) as Dr. Nathan Kurtzman
- Murder on the Blackboard (1934) as Dr. Max Von Immen
- The Moonstone (1934) as Carl von Lucker
- Little Men (1934) as Schoolmaster Page (uncredited)
- The Night Is Young (1935) as Ambassador (uncredited)
- She (1935) as Billali (uncredited)
- Remember Last Night? (1935) as Professor Karl Jones
- Mr. Deeds Goes to Town (1936) as Doctor Emile von Haller (uncredited)
- Murder on a Bridle Path (1936) as Doctor Bloom
- Mad Holiday (1936) as Hendrick Van Mier
- In Old Chicago (1938) as Dutch
- Paradise for Three (1938) as Lawyer (uncredited)
- Swiss Miss (1938) as Gardener (uncredited)
- Marie Antoinette (1938) as King's Confessor (uncredited)
- King of Alcatraz (1938) as Bill Lustig (uncredited)
- Cipher Bureau (1938) as Albert Grood
- Son of Frankenstein (1939) as A burgher #1
- Hotel Imperial (1939) as Priest (uncredited)
- Never Say Die (1939) as Chemist (uncredited)
- Nurse Edith Cavell (1939) as President of Court
- The Mad Empress (1939) as Ambassador Metternich

=== As director ===
- The Secret Garden (1919)
- Princess Jones (1921)
- Closed Doors (1921)
- Peggy Puts It Over (1921)
