= The Tents of Allah =

1923 film

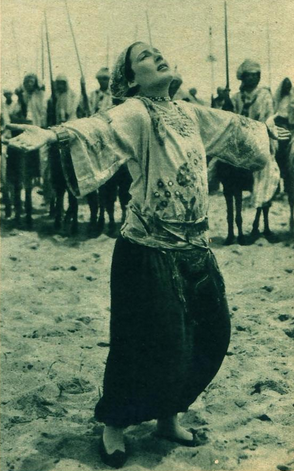
- Directed by: Charles A. Logue
- Written by: Charles Logue
- Produced by: Edward A. MacManus
- Starring: Monte Blue; Mary Alden; Frank Currier
- Cinematography: Gene O'Donnell; Conrad Wells
- Production company: Encore Pictures
- Distributed by: Associated Exhibitors
- Release date: March 4, 1923
- Running time: 70 minutes
- Country: United States
- Language: Silent (English intertitles)

The Tents of Allah is a lost 1923 American silent drama film written and directed by Charles A. Logue and starring Monte Blue, Mary Alden, and Frank Currier.

== Synopsis ==
While visiting her uncle, the American consul in Tangier, Morocco, a young woman offends a powerful Sultan whose henchman kidnap her.

== Cast ==
- Monte Blue as Chiddar Ben-Ek
- Mary Alden as Oulaid
- Frank Currier as Abou Ben-Ek / American Consul
- Mary Thurman as Elaine Calvert
- Amalia Rivera as Chala
- Martin Faust as Ahleef
- Macey Harlam as The Sultan
- Charles Lane as Commander Millgrate
- Sally Crute as Cynthia Wheeler

== Preservation ==
With no prints of The Tents of Allah located in any film archives, it is a lost film.

== Bibliography ==
- Munden, Kenneth White. The American Film Institute Catalog of Motion Pictures Produced in the United States, Part 1. University of California Press, 1997.
