= Conrad Wells =

American cinematographer and film editor

- Born: Abraham Fried; June 27, 1901; New York City, US
- Died: January 2, 1930 (aged 28); Santa Monica, California, US
- Occupation: Cinematographer
- Years active: 1919–1930

Conrad Wells (June 27, 1901 – January 2, 1930) was an American cinematographer and film editor.

== Biography ==
Wells began his film career as a camera assistant, becoming a full cameraman in 1919. He specialized in outdoor cinematography often on Westerns and action-adventure films. Conrad Wells was born as Abraham Fried but began using "Conrad Wells" in 1927.

On January 2, 1930, while filming aerial scenes for the film Such Men Are Dangerous, he was killed in a plane crash over the Pacific Ocean along with 9 others: pilot Walter Ross Cook, cameraman George Eastman, assistant director Ben Frankel, assistant director Max Gold, Tom Harris, Harry Johannes, Otho Jordan, director Kenneth Hawks, and pilot Halleck Rouse. The planes that crashed into each other were identical Stinson SM-1F Detroiters; temporary blindness from sun glare was listed as a probable cause.

He is buried at the Home of Peace Memorial Park in East Los Angeles, California.

== Filmography ==
- The Lost Battalion (1919)
- Even as Eve (1920)
- The Good-Bad Wife (1920)
- Man and Woman (1920)
- The Man from Hell's River (1922)
- The Woman Who Fooled Herself (1922)
- The Tents of Allah (1923)
- The Galloping Fish (1924)
- His Forgotten Wife (1924)
- Three in Exile (1925)
- With This Ring (1925)
- Wreckage (1925)
- The Silent Guardian (1925)
- The Phantom Express (1925)
- Rustling for Cupid (1926)
- The Midnight Kiss (1926)
- The Country Beyond (1926)
- Bertha, the Sewing Machine Girl (1926)
- The Brute (1927)
- The Black Diamond Express (1927)
- The Swell-Head (1927)
- The Desired Woman (1927)
- Dressed to Kill (1928)
- Chicken a La King (1928)
- Dry Martini (1928)
- Romance of the Underworld (1928)
- Captain Lash (1929)
- True Heaven (1929)
- New Year's Eve (1929)
- The Woman from Hell (1929)
- Behind That Curtain (1929)
- The Sky Hawk (1929)
- Let's Go Places (1930)
- Such Men Are Dangerous (1930)
