= Cora (film) =

1915 film by Edwin Carewe

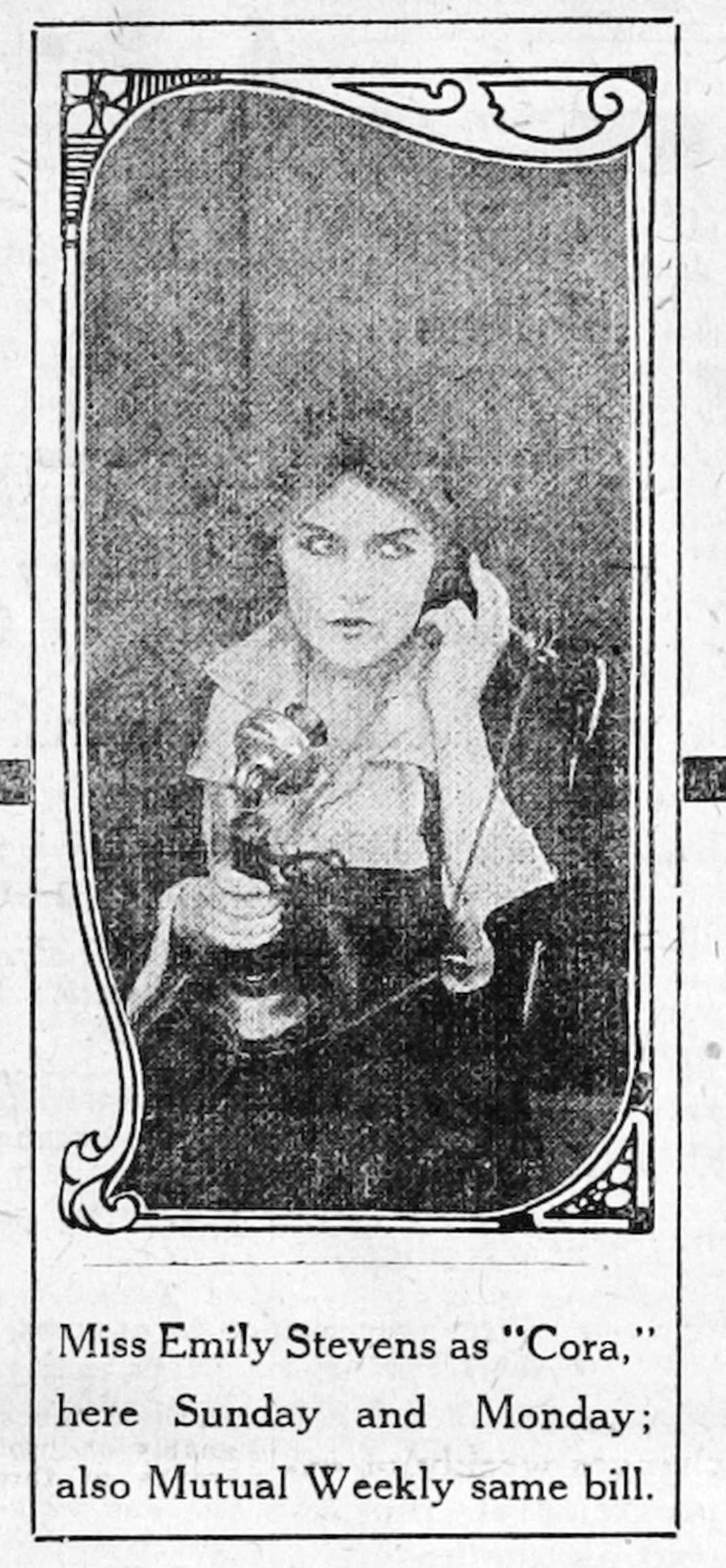
- Newspaper publicity photo
- Directed by: Edwin Carewe
- Written by: Fred De Gresac (play)
- Produced by: B. A. Rolfe
- Starring: Emily Stevens; Edwin Carewe; Ethel Stewart
- Production company: Rolfe Photoplays
- Distributed by: Metro Pictures
- Release date: May 9, 1915
- Running time: 50 minutes
- Country: United States
- Languages: Silent; English intertitles

Cora is a 1915 American silent drama film directed by Edwin Carewe and starring Emily Stevens, Edwin Carewe and Ethel Stewart. Cora was Stevens' film debut.

== Plot ==
Cora, the daughter of a famous opera star, moves with her mother from Paris to the United States, before her mother suddenly passes away. Cora goes to live with Marie, a model for artist George Garnier. George is engaged to the wealthy Helen Van Brooks, while Helen is in love with Carl Wilson, a "club man". Despite his engagement, George and Cora fall in love. Eventually, Helen and Carl elope and Cora and George decide to marry.

== Cast ==
- Emily Stevens as Cora
- Edwin Carewe as George Garnier
- Ethel Stewart
- Frank Elliott

== Preservation ==
With no prints of Cora located in any film archives, it is considered a lost film.

== Bibliography ==
- Goble, Alan. The Complete Index to Literary Sources in Film. Walter de Gruyter, 1999. ISBN 978-1-85739-229-6.
