= Even as Eve =

1920 film

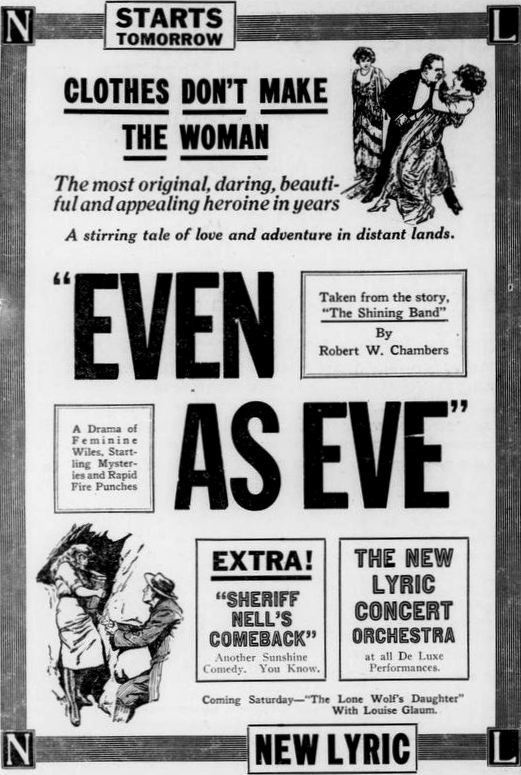
- Newspaper advertisement
- Directed by: Chester De Vonde; B. A. Rolfe
- Written by: Charles Logue
- Produced by: B. A. Rolfe
- Starring: Grace Darling
- Cinematography: Arthur A. Cadwell, Conrad Wells
- Production companies: A. H. Fischer Features, Inc.
- Distributed by: Associated First National Pictures
- Release date: January 15, 1920
- Country: United States
- Language: Silent (English intertitles)

Even as Eve is a 1920 American silent drama film by A. H. Fischer Features and distributed by Associated First National Pictures. Produced by B. A. Rolfe, the film was directed by Rolfe and Chester De Vonde, with Arthur A. Cadwell and Conrad Wells (as A. Fried) as cinematographers. It was filmed at the former Thanhouser Company studios in New Rochelle, New York. Some exterior scenes were filmed in the New York Adirondack Mountains and on a Long Island estate. It was based on the short story "The Shining Band" by Robert W. Chambers, and adapted by Charles Logue.

== Plot ==
Eileen O’Hara lives with her father as part of a religious cult known as the Shining Band, based in a compound in the Adirondack Mountains. Her father remains embittered by her mother's infidelity years earlier. Peyster Sproul, president of the Sagamore Club, seeks to buy the O’Hara land to develop it into a summer resort. Sproul is the man with whom Eileen's mother had the affair, and when Mr. O’Hara recognizes him, the two argue, leading to Mr. O’Hara's death. Sproul then bribes Amasu Munn, the dishonest cult leader, to obtain an illegitimate claim on the property. Sproul tries to steal the deed from Eileen but is thwarted by young Dr. Lansing who has become enamored with Eileen. She then marries Dr. Lansing.

== Cast ==
- Grace Darling as Eileen O'Hara
- Ramsey Wallace as Dr. Lansing
- E. J. Ratcliffe as Peyster Sproul
- Sally Crute as Agatha Sproul
- Marc McDermott as O'Hara
- Gustav von Seyffertitz as Amasu Munn
- John Goldsworthy as De Witt Courser
- John L. Shine as Colonel Hyssop
- Robert Paton Gibbs as Major Brent
- Diana Allen
