= The Woman Who Fooled Herself =

1922 film

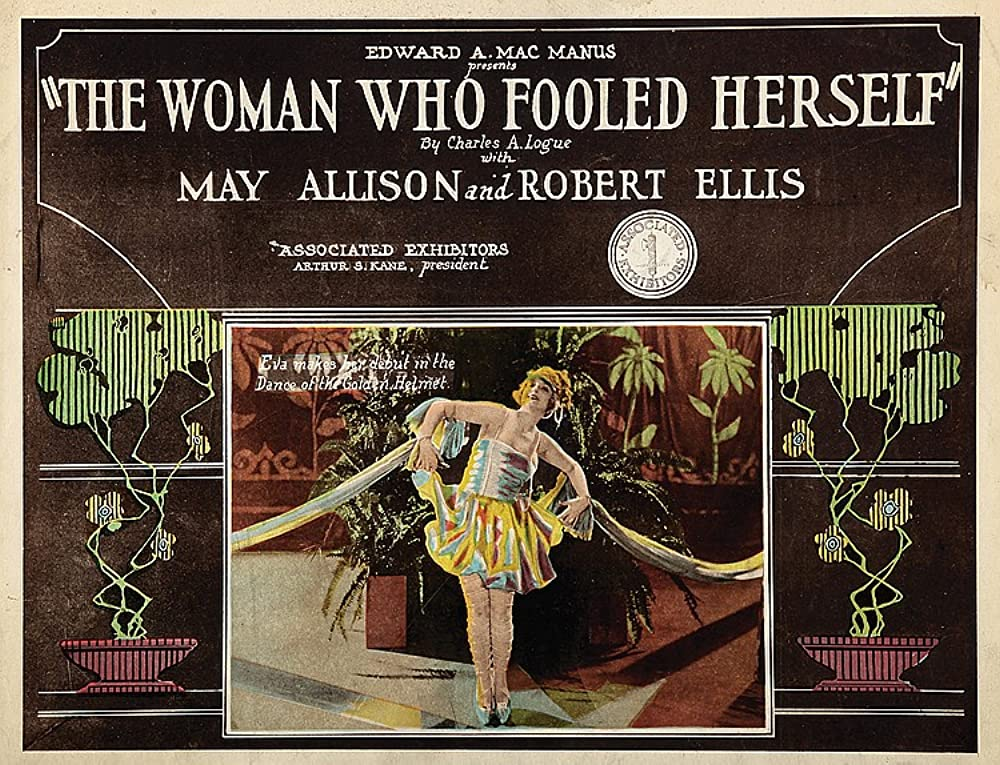
- Directed by: Charles A. Logue
- Written by: Charles A. Logue; Robert Ellis
- Produced by: Edward A. MacManus
- Starring: May Allison; Robert Ellis; Frank Currier
- Cinematography: Conrad Wells
- Production company: Edward A. MacManus Productions
- Distributed by: Associated Exhibitors
- Release date: October 29, 1922
- Running time: 60 minutes
- Country: United States
- Languages: Silent; English intertitles

The Woman Who Fooled Herself is a 1922 American silent romantic drama film directed by Charles A. Logue and starring May Allison, Robert Ellis and Frank Currier.

== Cast ==
- May Allison as Eva Lee
- Robert Ellis as Fernando Pennington
- Frank Currier as Don Fernando Casablanca
- Bessie Wharton as Doña Marie Pennington
- Robert Schable as Cameron Camden
- Louis Dean as Eban Burnham
- Rafael Arcos as The Padre

== Bibliography ==
- Munden, Kenneth White. The American Film Institute Catalog of Motion Pictures Produced in the United States, Part 1. University of California Press, 1997. ISBN 978-0-520-20969-5.
