= Woman (1918 film) =

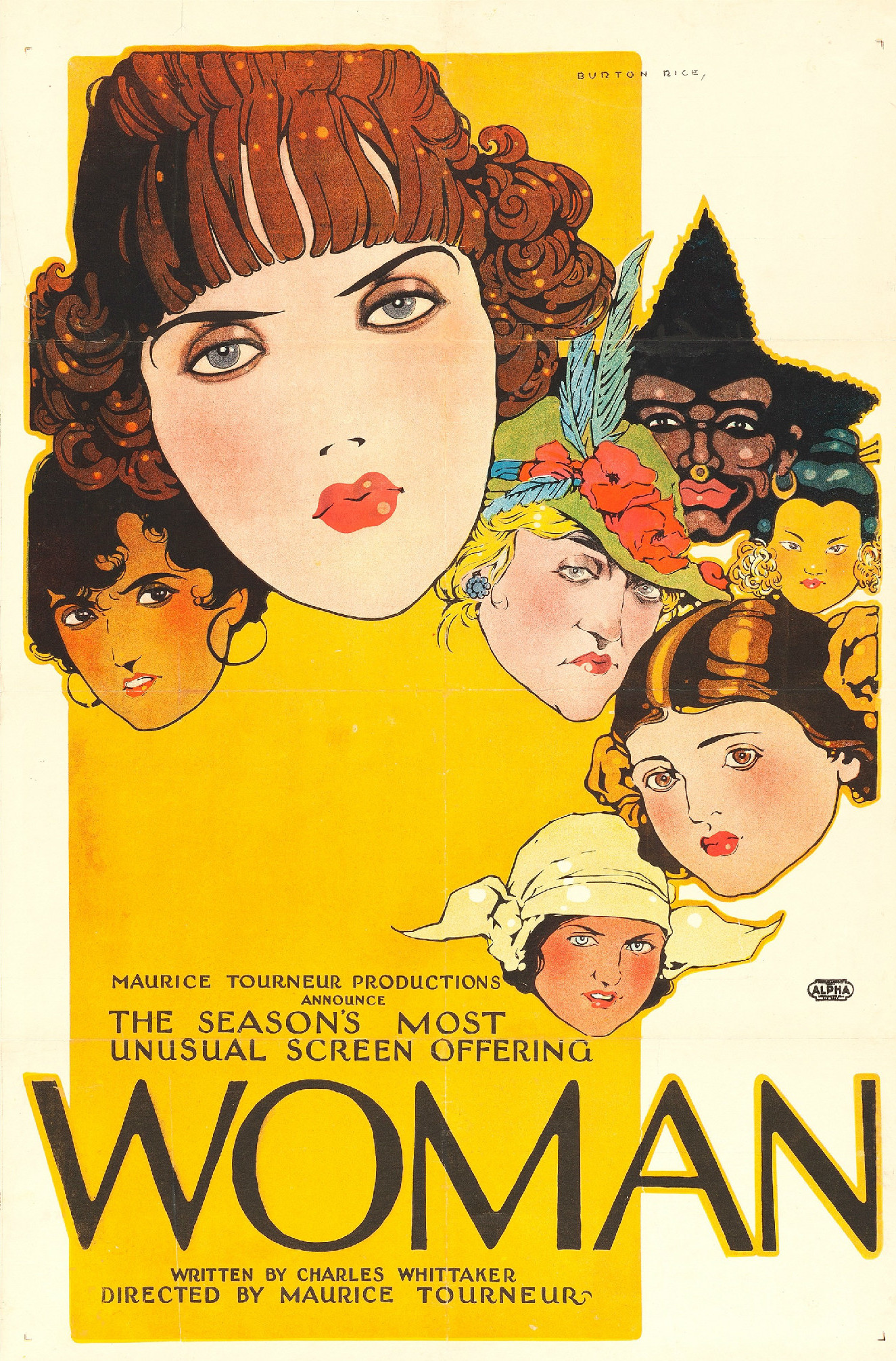
- Film poster
- Directed by: Maurice Tourneur
- Written by: Charles E. Whittaker
- Produced by: Maurice Tourneur
- Starring: Florence Billings; Warren Cook
- Cinematography: John van den Broek; René Guissart
- Music by: Hugo Riesenfeld; Edward Falck
- Distributed by: State Rights: Hiller & Wilk
- Release date: October 27, 1918
- Running time: 70 minutes; 7 reels
- Country: United States
- Language: Silent (English intertitles)

Woman, also known by its French title L'Éternelle Tentatrice is a 1918 American silent drama film directed by Maurice Tourneur, an allegorical film showcasing the story of women through points in time. Popular in its day, the film was distributed in the State's Rights plan as opposed to a major distributor, like Paramount Pictures or Universal Pictures.

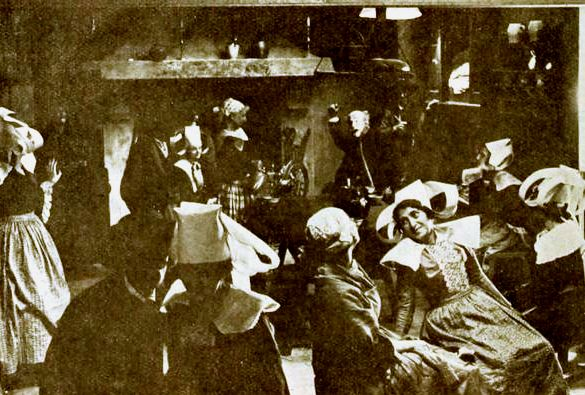
Film still

Some scenes were shot at Bar Harbor, Maine. It was here that one of Tourneur's cameramen, John van den Broek, lost his life while filming a scene close to the raging Atlantic Ocean. His body was swept out to sea and never found.

== Plot ==
As described in a film magazine, a modern man and woman quarrel and, in reaction to his wife, the husband recalls all the women in history who have failed their husbands or lovers. Being in an unpleasant state, he recalls Adam in the garden with a very vain Eve who disports herself in a Broadway fashion and causes the downfall of caveman-like Adam.

Then he dwells on the hideous betrayal of Claudius by an unfaithful Messalina. Next he recalls the useless ruination of Abelard by the charming Heloise. Following this episode he remembers Cyrene (Story that seems to be inspired from Selkies) and the fisherman, where the wife basely deserted her husband and children to swim once more in her seal skin that had been hidden from her for many years.

A particularly disagreeable episode in which a young woman during the American Civil War sacrifices a wounded soldier for a bauble. After this the modern woman returns and pins up a Red Cross poster, and the modern man sees the many women of today as more or less uninspiring.

An epilogue noted how World War I made men realize the true value of women, and that women are working towards victory through good works in the Red Cross and other jobs.The film ends with the martyrdom in Europe of nurse Edith Cavell.

== Cast ==
- Florence Billings as The Woman
- Warren Cook as The Man
- Ethel Hallor as Eve
- Henry West as Adam
- Flore Revalles as Messalina
- Paul Clerget as Claudius
- Diana Allen as Heloise
- Escamillo Fernandez as Abelard
- Gloria Goodwin as Cyrene
- Chester Barnett as The Fisherman
- Faire Binney as The Girl
- Warner Richmond as The Officer
- Lyn Donaldson
- Rose Rolanda

== Preservation ==
Prints of this film are held at Cineteca Del Friuli, Germona, the Museum of Modern Art, New York, and Gosfilmofond of Russia, Moscow, and in private collections.

== See also ==
- List of films and television shows about the American Civil War
