= Arthur A. Cadwell =

American cinematographer (1882–1937)

- Born: Arthur Albert Cadwell; October 8, 1882; Indianapolis, Indiana, USA
- Died: February 17, 1937 (aged 54); Lewisburg, Pennsylvania, USA
- Occupation: Cinematographer
- Spouse: Florence Vincent

Arthur A. Cadwell (often credited as A.A. Caldwell) was an American cinematographer and race car driver who worked in Hollywood in the 1910s and 1920s.

== Biography ==
Arthur was born Indianapolis, Indiana, to Ethan Cadwell and Lida Haney. He married actress Florence Vincent; the pair had a son, Arthur Jr., who would become a child actor.

He began shooting films around 1913, working primarily with Thanhauser and then the California Motion Picture Company during those early years. During this decade, he was also known for racing cars in Southern California.

In 1925, he and writer/director Hamilton Smith banded together to launch the Asheville Motion Pictures Corporation with the intent of developing a film industry in North Carolina. Little seems to have come from this venture.

== Selected filmography ==
- The Inner Man (1922)
- Fine Feathers (1921)
- Clothes (1920)
- Madonnas and Men (1920)
- A Woman's Business (1920)
- Even as Eve (1920)
- A Scream in the Night (1919)
- Three Black Eyes (1919)
- The Lost Battalion (1919)
- As a Man Thinks (1919)
- Too Fat to Fight (1918)
- Laughing Bill Hyde (1918)
- A Wife by Proxy (1917)
- The Sunbeam (1916)
- The Dawn of Love (1916)
- The Child of Destiny (1916)
- The Kiss of Hate (1916)
- A Royal Family (1915)
- Salomy Jane (1914)
- Cymbeline (1913)
- Won at the Rodeo (1913)
- The Idol of the Hour (1913)
- An Honest Young Man (1913)
- Her Neighbor (1913)
- His Heroine (1913)
- The Way to a Man's Heart (1913)
- When Dreams Come True (1913)
- The Pretty Girl in Lower Five (1913)
- Some Fools There Were (1913)
