= Eddie Wittstein =

Eddie Wittstein (February 22, 1885 – December 22, 1975) was an American bandleader popular in New Haven, Connecticut and Yale University in the first half of the 20th century.

Wittstein grew up in New Haven, and was performing professionally in a band by the time he was 14. He was awarded a music scholarship to Yale in 1904, and was concertmaster for the Yale Symphony Orchestra. He started an orchestra that played for silent films after graduation.

Wittstein and his orchestra began performing regularly in the Yale dining hall during meals. In 1910, he debuted Cole Porter's "Bingo Eli Yale," a Yale fight song which is still sung. Wittstein also conducted the annual proms at Yale for 52 years, starting around 1912.

A 1924 newspaper profile credited Wittstein for launching the careers of opera singer Rosa Ponselle, dancer Allyn King, and actress/dancer Diana Allen. According to the story, after Wittstein started playing violin for Yale students about 20 years prior. Ponselle was a cashier in the restaurant which hired Wittstein to play, and brought her on to sing. Allen was then brought on as a performer for Wittstein's budding "cabaret". After those two left for New York, Wittstein brought on King. Broadway composer Harold Rome also played for piano for Wittstein's band while attending Yale in 1927.

Wittstein, still conducting at age 89, was highlighted in a 1974 article in The New York Times about a revival of Yale's annual prom. He died in December 1975.
