= Sally Crute =

American silent film actress

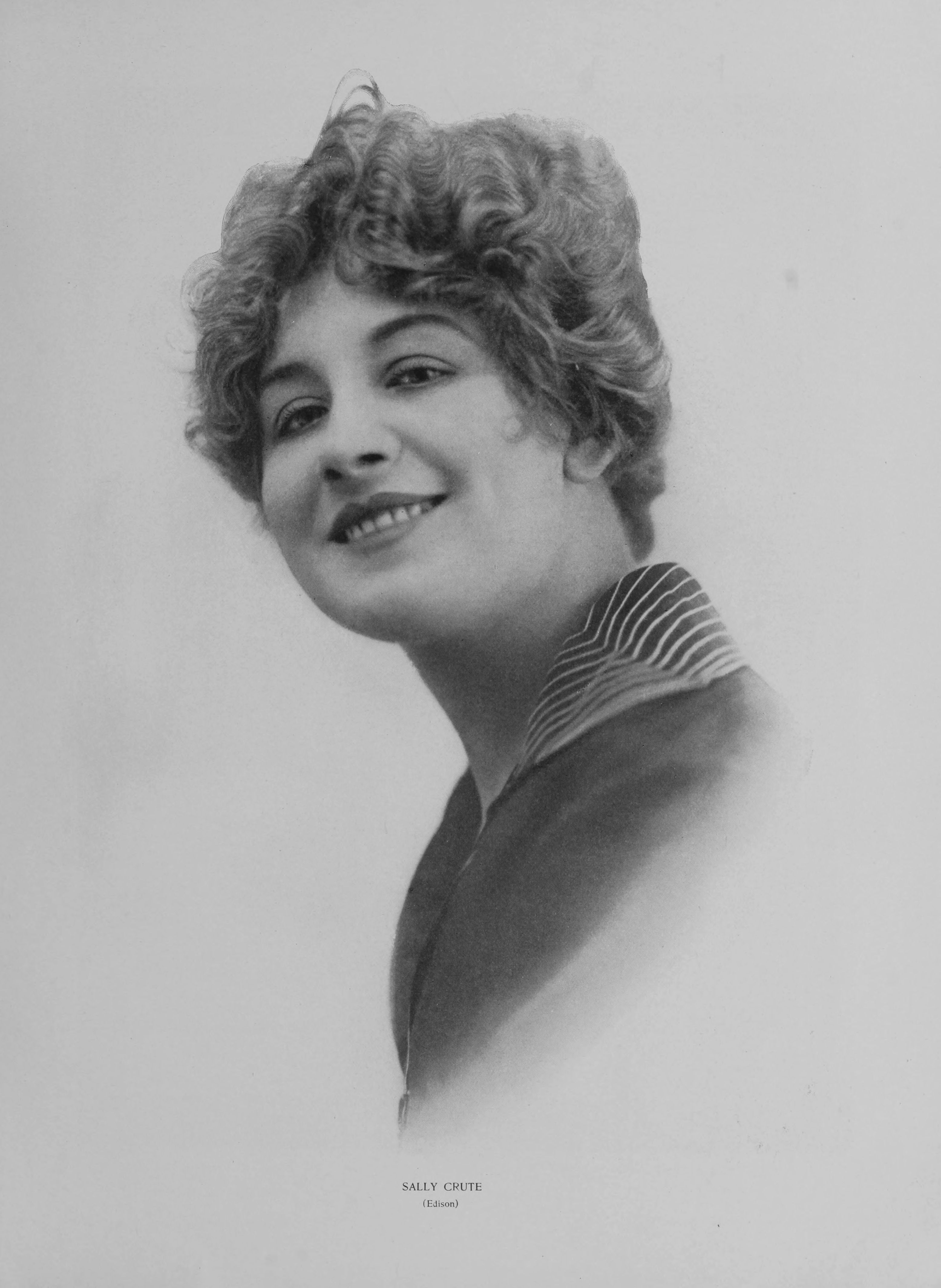
- Crute in 1916
- Born: Sally C. Kirby; June 27, 1886; Chattanooga, Tennessee, U.S.
- Died: August 12, 1971 (aged 85); Miami, Florida, U.S.
- Occupation: Actress

Sally Crute (born Sally C. Kirby, June 27, 1886 – August 12, 1971) was an American actress of the silent film era.

== Biography ==
Born in Chattanooga, Tennessee, before entering motion pictures Crute performed on stage. Crute was generally cast as a widow or man charmer in movies. She was employed by Edison Studios. She was a leading woman of Harold Lockwood, Joseph Burks, and Frank Lyon, among others.

In In Spite of All (1915) she played the role of Stella, a famous dancer who lures the film's hero. In Her Vocation (1915), she appeared as an adventurous newspaper woman in a cast which included Augustus Phillips. As Lucille Stanton, in When Men Betray (1918), Crute performs as a female so enticing she makes men her willing slaves.

After leaving motion pictures in 1925, Crute returned to make The Ace of Cads in 1926. The film starred Adolphe Menjou. She also appeared in Tin Gods (1926) with Thomas Meighan.

Crute died in 1971 in Miami, Florida.

== Partial filmography ==
- The House of the Lost Court (1915) - Nina Desmond
- The Light at Dusk (1916)
- The Cossack Whip (1916)
- Blue Jeans (1917) - Sue Eudaly
- The Law of Compensation (1917)
- The Beautiful Lie (1917)
- The Avenging Trail (1917)
- The Awakening of Ruth (1917)
- A Wife by Proxy (1917)
- The Tell-Tale Step (1917)
- The Law of the North (1917)
- The Power of Decision (1917)
- The Belgian (1918) - Countess de Vries
- When Men Betray (1918) - Lucille Stanton
- Opportunity (1918)
- Eye for Eye (1918) - Helene
- The Poor Rich Man (1918)
- Atonement (1919)
- A Broadway Saint (1919)
- The Undercurrent (1919)
- The Greatest Love (1920)
- Even as Eve (1920) - Agatha Sproul
- The Garter Girl (1920) - Lynette
- Blind Wives (1920) - Business Woman
- Miss 139 (1921) - Vera Cardine
- It Isn't Being Done This Season (1921)
- The Tents of Allah (1923)
- Broadway Broke (1923)
- His Children's Children (1923) - Mrs. Wingate
- Week End Husbands (1924)
- A Little Girl in a Big City (1925)
- The Half-Way Girl (1925) - Effie
- Ermine and Rhinestones (1925) - Alys Ferring
- Tin Gods (1926)
- The Ace of Cads (1926)
