= The Avenging Trail =

1917 American silent drama film, directed by Francis Ford

- Directed by: Francis Ford
- Written by: Mary Murillo; Fred J. Balshofer
- Based on: the short story, "The Adopted Son" by Max Brand
- Produced by: Fred J. Balshofer
- Starring: Harold Lockwood; Sally Crute; Joseph Dailey
- Cinematography: Antonio Gaudio
- Production companies: Metro Pictures; Yorke Film Corp.
- Release date: December 31, 1917 (US)
- Running time: 5 reels
- Country: United States
- Language: Silent (English intertitles)

The Avenging Trail is a 1917 American silent drama film directed by Francis Ford and starring Harold Lockwood, Sally Crute, and Joseph Dailey. It was released on December 31, 1917.

== Plot ==
Gaston Olaf returns home from college and finds out that his father has been murdered, and his timberlands stolen. To exact revenge, he becomes a lumberjack. One day he saves Rose Havens from the unwanted attention of Lefty Red. Impressed with the young man, Dave Taggert replaces Red with Olaf as his lumber supervisor. When Olaf learns of Taggert's plan to cheat Rose out of payment for the lumber his men have felled on her property, Olaf stands up to his boss and demands that Rose receive payment. Olaf refuses to make delivery of the wood until payment is made.

Taggert pretends to concede to Olaf's demands, and makes payment to Rose. However, he orders one of his men, Lefty Red, to go to Rose's place of business and steal the money back. Olaf foils the robbery and he and Lefty Red struggle, with Olaf eventually fatally wounding the Red. Before he dies, Red confesses to having killed Olaf's father at the behest of Taggert.

Olaf exposes Taggert's thieving ways to the entire town, and the two men fight, after which Olaf simply leaves Taggert's fate up to the angry vengeful townspeople. Having saved Rose, the two pledge their love for one another and vow to marry.

== Cast list ==
- Harold Lockwood as Gaston Olaf
- Sally Crute as Rose Havens
- Joseph Dailey as Tom Pine
- Walter Lewis as Devil Dave Taggert
- Louis Wolheim as Lefty Red
- William Clifford as William Hale
- Warren Cook as Dr. Saunders
- Lettie Ford as Mrs. Havens
- Artie Ortego as Taggart's Indian

== Production ==
In early December it was announced that Sally Crute had been engaged as the female lead in the film, to star opposite Harold Lockwood. At the same time it was revealed that Francis Ford would be the director, with producing duties carried out by Fred Balshofer. Also in early December Metro announced that The Avenging Trail would be its final release of the year, scheduling it for December 31. By December 8, all the interior filming had been completed, and work was begun on the exterior scenes. Those exterior scene were shot at a lumber camp near North Conway, New Hampshire. While on location, the film's assistant director, Johnnie Waters, was called to active duty in the U.S. Army. He left the location and reported for duty on December 7.

The film was released on December 31, 1917.

== Reception ==
The Exhibitors Herald gave the film a mediocre review. They felt the script was "mediocre" and "hackneyed", but felt the pace of the film was good, and the cinematography was excellent. They were also complimentary of the cast, singling out Lockwood's performance.

== Preservation ==
With no holdings located in archives, The Avenging Trail is considered a lost film.
