= Destiny: Or, The Soul of a Woman =

1915 film directed by Edwin Carewe

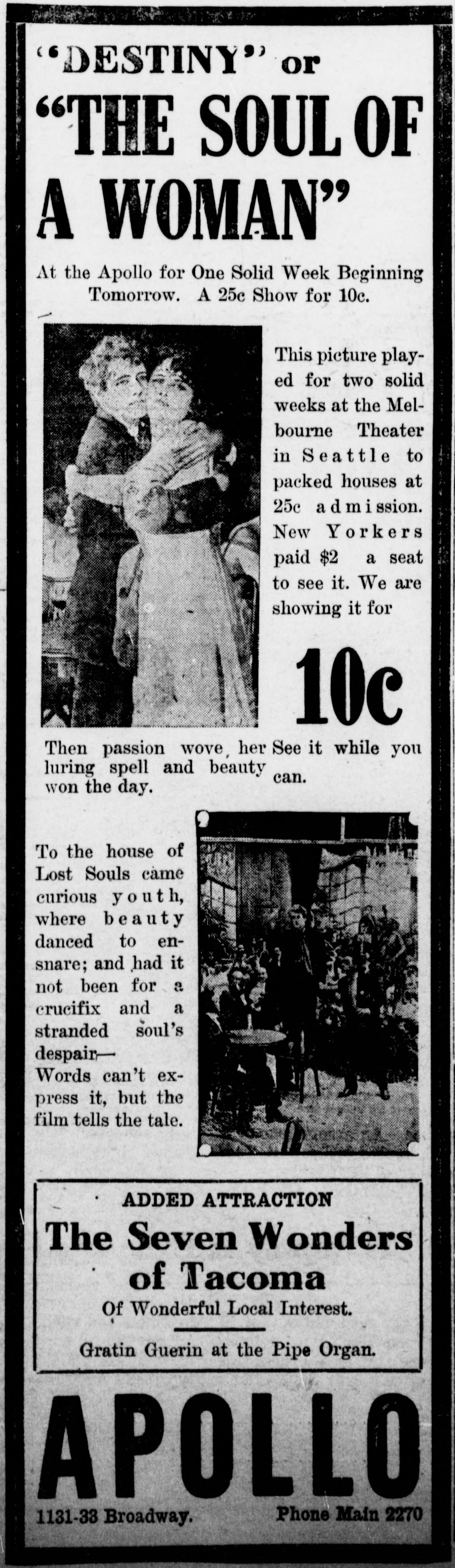
- Newspaper advertisement
- Directed by: Edwin Carewe
- Written by: Anthony Paul Kelly
- Produced by: B.A. Rolfe
- Starring: Emily Stevens; George Le Guere; Walter Hitchcock
- Cinematography: William C. Thompson
- Production company: Rolfe Photoplays
- Distributed by: Metro Pictures
- Release date: September 6, 1915
- Country: United States
- Languages: Silent; English intertitles

Destiny is a 1915 American silent drama film directed by Edwin Carewe and starring Emily Stevens, George Le Guere and Walter Hitchcock.

== Cast ==
- Emily Stevens as Mary Gadman
- George Le Guere as The Boy
- Walter Hitchcock as The Connoisseur
- Theodore Babcock as Standish
- Fred Stone as Parishioner
- Howard Truesdale as Father Anthony
- Henri Bergman as Avarice
- Effingham Pinto as Lust
- Del DeLois as Rum
- Florence Short as Passion
- Vivien Oakland as Beauty
- Ralph Austin as The Neighbor
- Edwin Martin as Father Time / Death
- Baby Field as Baby

== Preservation ==
3 reels of the 5-reel long film Destiny are held by the Library of Congress. The remaining 2 reels are considered lost.

== Bibliography ==
- Darby, William. Masters of Lens and Light: A Checklist of Major Cinematographers and Their Feature Films. Scarecrow Press, 1991.
