= Miss Robinson Crusoe =

1917 silent film directed by Christy Cabanne

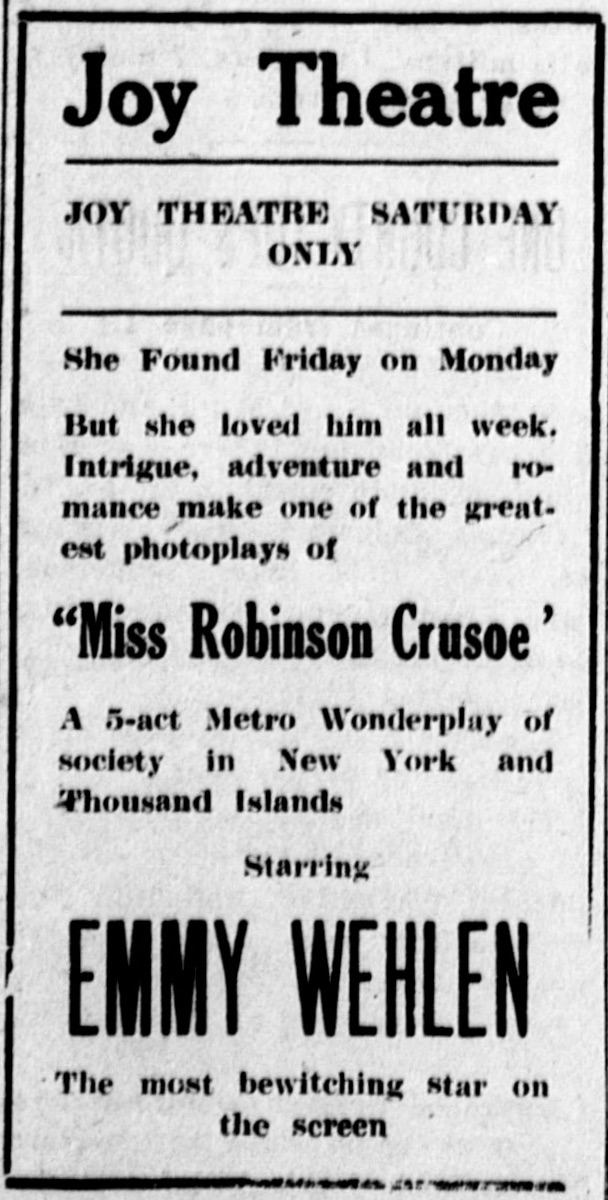
- Newspaper advertisement
- Directed by: Christy Cabanne
- Written by: June Mathis; Christy Cabanne
- Produced by: B. A. Rolfe
- Starring: Emmy Wehlen; Walter C. Miller; Harold Entwistle
- Cinematography: William Fildew
- Production company: Rolfe Photoplays
- Distributed by: Metro Pictures
- Release date: July 30, 1917 (US)
- Running time: 5 reels
- Country: United States
- Language: English

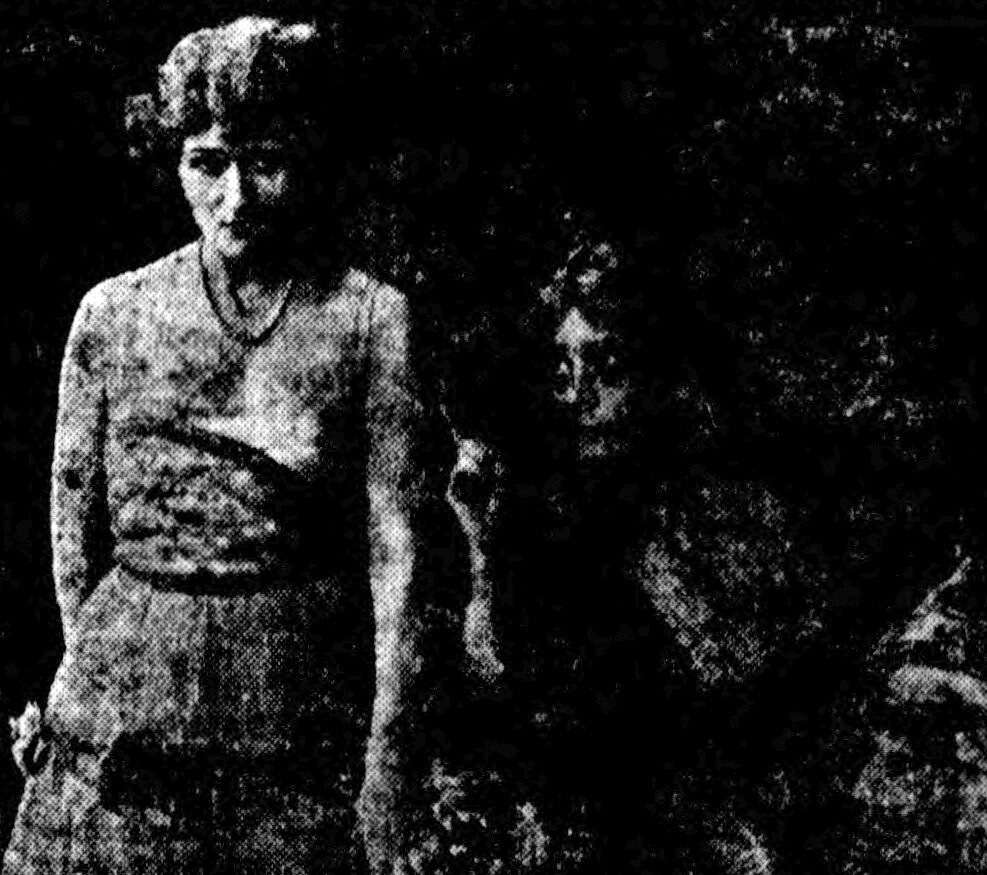
Scene from the film.

Miss Robinson Crusoe is a 1917 silent American comedy-drama film, directed by Christy Cabanne. It stars Emmy Wehlen, Walter C. Miller, and Harold Entwistle, and was released on July 30, 1917.

== Cast ==
- Emmy Wehlen as Pamela Sayre
- Walter Miller as Bertie Holden (*as Walter C. Miller)
- Harold Entwistle as Charles Van Gordon
- Sue Balfour as Aunt Agatha
- Margaret Seddon as Aunt Eloise
- Augustus Phillips as Bertini
- Daniel Jarrett as Van Hoffman
- Ethel Hallor
