= The Way of a Maid =

1921 film

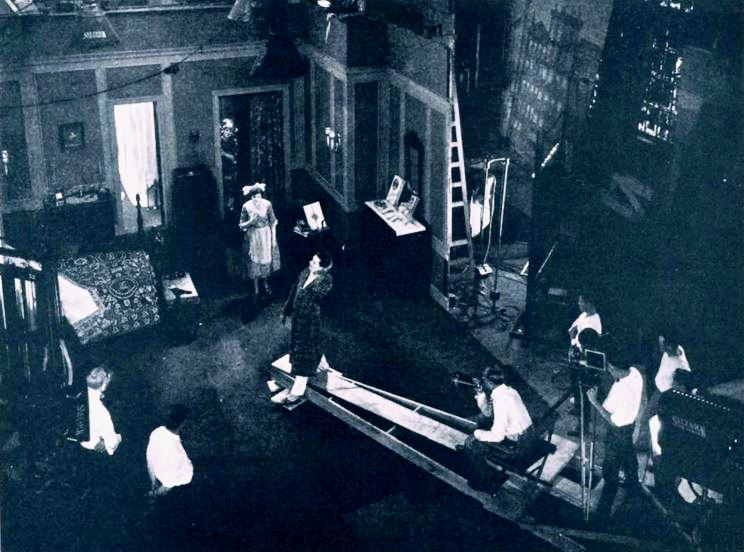
- Production still of shot where Niles Welch has gotten out of bed and has a dizzy spell. Welch is standing on a platform with the camera and they can be moved together, making it appear in the film that the room and Elaine Hammerstein are moving while Welch is motionless.
- Directed by: William P. S. Earle
- Written by: Lewis Allen Browne
- Story by: Rex Taylor
- Produced by: Selznick Pictures; Lewis J. Selznick
- Starring: Elaine Hammerstein; Diana Allen
- Cinematography: William F. Wagner
- Production company: Selznick Pictures
- Distributed by: Select Pictures
- Release date: November 30, 1921
- Running time: 5 reels (4,800 feet)
- Country: United States
- Language: Silent (English intertitles)

The Way of a Maid is a surviving 1921 American silent comedy-drama film produced by Selznick Pictures and starring Elaine Hammerstein. It was released by Select Pictures and directed by William P. S. Earle from an original story for the screen. A print of the film is held by the Library of Congress.

== Plot ==
As described in a film magazine, successful candy salesman Tom Lawlor (Welch) returns to his hotel room and finds it in disorder. Mistaking the young society woman Naida Castleton (Hammerstein), entering the room across the hall from his, for a maid, Tom orders her to make his bed. She keenly enjoys the joke and keeps up the deception as "Marie", and afterwards when Tom's mother Mrs. Lawlor (Lindroth) asks her to become her secretary, Naida accepts the position when her fortune has been swept away. Tom falls in love with her. Naida is sent to Newport to open up a summer home the Lawlor's have recently purchased, one which formerly belonged to Naida's family, her friends descend on her and she is forced to disclose her identity to Tom and his family. She accepts Tom, however, when she finds that he loves her just as much as Naida, society swell, as Marie the maid.

== Cast ==
- Diana Allen as Dorothy Graham
- Charles D. Brown as Gordon Witherspoon
- George Fawcett as David Lawlor
- Elaine Hammerstein as Naida Castleton
- Arthur Housman as Jimmy Van Trent
- Helen Lindroth as Mrs. Lawlor
- Niles Welch as Thomas Lawlor
