= The Duchess of Doubt =

1917 silent film directed by George D. Baker

- Directed by: George D. Baker
- Screenplay by: George D. Baker (scenario)
- Story by: John B. Clymer; Charles A. Logue
- Produced by: B. A. Rolfe
- Starring: Emmy Wehlen; Ricca Allen; Frank Currier
- Cinematography: Joseph Shelderfer
- Production companies: Metro Pictures; Rolfe Photoplays
- Release date: May 28, 1917 (US)
- Running time: 5 reels
- Country: United States
- Language: English

The Duchess of Doubt is a 1917 American silent comedy film, directed by George D. Baker. It stars Emmy Wehlen, Ricca Allen, and Frank Currier, and was released on May 28, 1917.

== Cast ==
- Emmy Wehlen as Clover Ames
- Ricca Allen as Aunt Sarah
- Frank Currier as Pierre Dubois
- George Stuart Christie as Walter Gray
- Peggy Parr as Helen Brentwood
- Kate Blancke as Mrs. Brentwood
- Walter Horton as Steve Gordon
- Ilean Hume as Alice Harris
- Charles Eldridge as Walter Gray, Sr.
- Fred C. Truesdell as Henry Strang

== Production ==
Some of the scenes were shot on location in Palm Beach, St. Augustine, and Jacksonville, Florida. Guests who were staying at the resorts in those cities were used as extras for the big hotel scenes.

== Reception ==
The Houston Post gave the film a favorable review, calling it "a true Metro wonder play". The complimented Wehlen's performance, as well as the photography. The Freeport Journal-Standard also enjoyed the picture, naming it "one of the most attractive screen stories yet produced by Metro." And The Tacoma Daily Register was positive about the movie as well, "This is a genuine romance with a modern setting, and its story is one of deep interest.
