= A Scream in the Night (1919 film) =

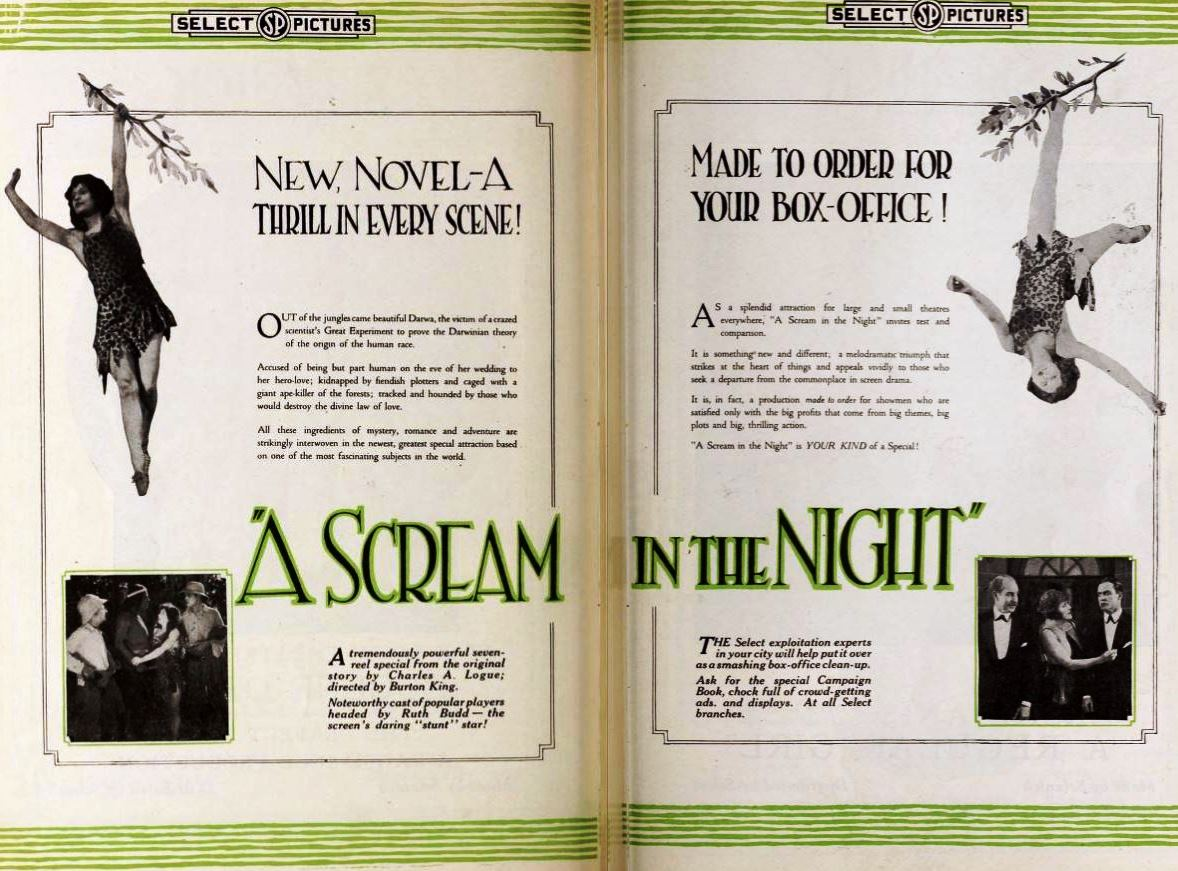
- Directed by: Leander De Cordova; Burton L. King
- Written by: Charles A. Logue
- Produced by: A.H. Fischer; B.A. Rolfe
- Starring: Ruth Budd; Ralph Kellard; Edna Britton
- Cinematography: Arthur A. Cadwell; William A. Reinhart
- Edited by: John J. Keeley
- Production company: A.H. Fischer Features
- Distributed by: Select Pictures
- Release date: October 5, 1919
- Running time: 60 minutes
- Country: United States
- Languages: Silent; English intertitles

A Scream in the Night is a 1919 American silent drama film directed by Leander De Cordova and Burton L. King and starring Ruth Budd, Ralph Kellard and Edna Britton.

== Cast ==
- Ruth Budd as Darwa
- Ralph Kellard as Robert Hunter
- Edna Britton as Vaneva Carter
- John Webb Dillion as Prof. Silvio
- Edward Roseman as Lotec
- Stephen Grattan as Sen. Newcastle
- Adelbert Hugo as Floris
- Louis Stern as Mr. Graham

== Bibliography ==
- Soister, John T., Nicolella, Henry & Joyce, Steve. American Silent Horror, Science Fiction and Fantasy Feature Films, 1913-1929. McFarland, 2014.
