= Rolfe Photoplays =

American film production company

- Industry: Motion picture
- Founded: 1915
- Founder: B.A. Rolfe
- Defunct: 1920
- Key people: Maxwell Karger

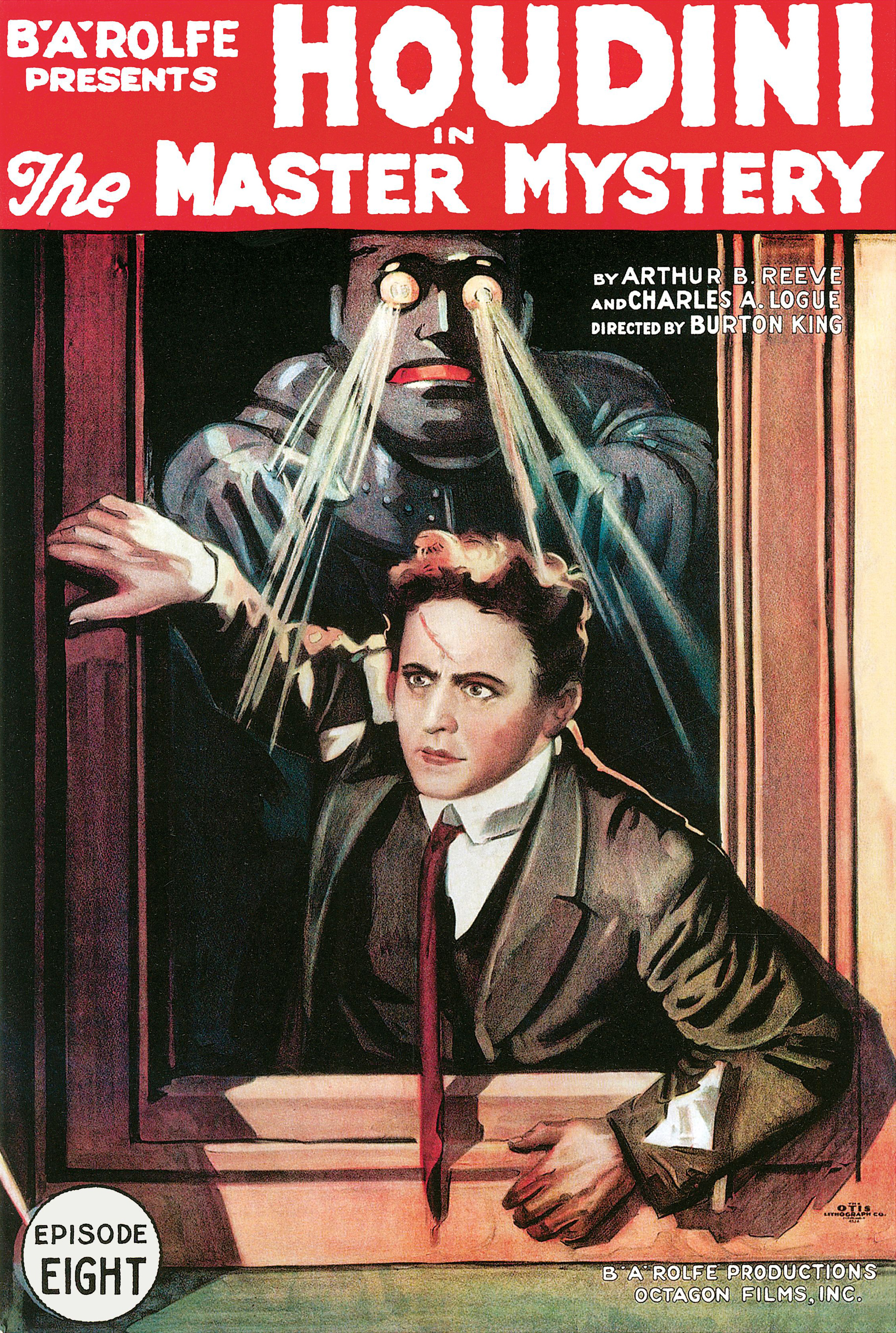
B.A. Rolfe's "Houdini Serial", 1919

Silent movie The Master Mystery (1919). Running time: 09:39. Episode of a serial in fifteen episodes with magician and escape artist Houdini in the lead.

Rolfe Photoplays Inc., originally B. A. Rolfe Photoplays Company, was an American motion picture production company established by musical entertainer B.A. Rolfe. Its productions were primarily filmed on the East Coast, usually in and around Fort Lee, New Jersey, although the company also filmed in California. Its films were distributed through an agreement with Louis B. Mayer's Metro Pictures Corporation.

Between 1915 and 1918, B.A. Rolfe used Rolfe Photoplays Inc. to produce forty-nine silent films, several of which were collaborations with director/screenwriter Oscar A.C. Lund including the 1916 drama "Dorian's Divorce" starring Lionel Barrymore. As well, he used the corporate name "B.A. Rolfe Photoplayers Inc." and "B.A. Rolfe Productions" to produce another three films including the 1919 fifteen-part mystery serial The Master Mystery starring Harry Houdini. Maxwell Karger was an executive at the studio. By 1920, the B.A. Rolfe production companies ceased operating.

== Films ==
- Rip Van Winkle (1914)
- The Three of Us (1914)
- Satan Sanderson, adapted from a 1907 book by Hallie Erminie Rives
- The Cowboy and the Lady (1915)
- Destiny (1915)
- Cora (1915)
- Marse Covington (1915)
- Dorian's Divorce (1916)
- The Purple Lady (1916)
- The Sunbeam (1916)
- The Brand of Cowardice (1916)
- The Awakening of Helena Richie
- The White Raven (1917)
- The Trail of the Shadow (1917)
- Miss Robinson Crusoe (1917)
- The Duchess of Doubt (1917)
- The Girl Without a Soul (1917)
- The Barricade (1917)
