= Bert Robinson =

English cricketer

Albert George Robinson was an English cricketer active from 1937 to 1955 who played for Northamptonshire (Northants). He was born in Leicester on 22 March 1917 and died on 31 July 2009 (location unknown). He appeared in 24 first-class matches as a righthanded batsman who bowled right arm fast medium. He scored 167 runs with a highest score of 32 and took 35 wickets with a best performance of five for 37.
