= Diana Allen =

Swedish-American actress

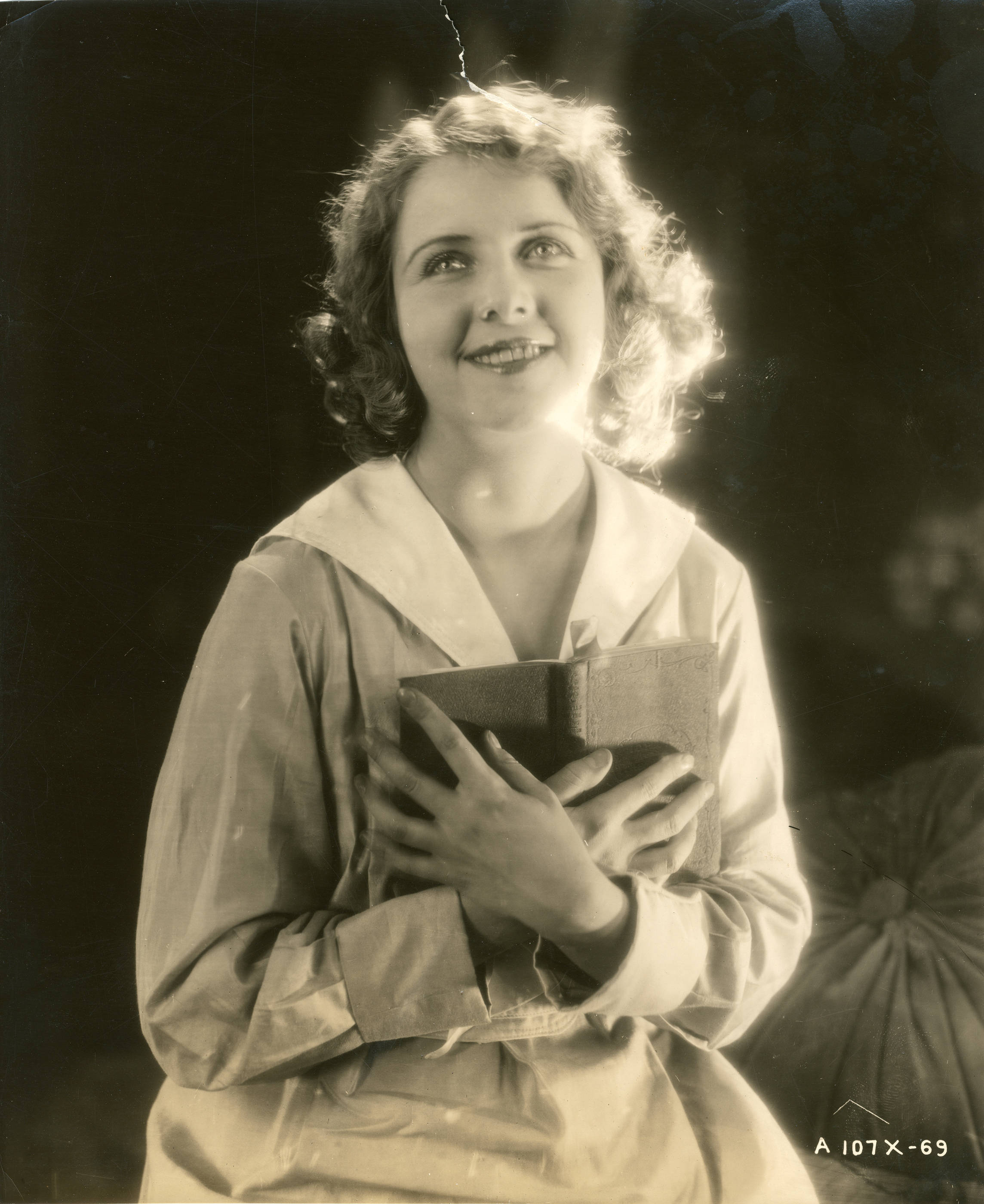
- Allen in 1920
- Born: 1898; Gotland, Sweden
- Died: June 12, 1949 (aged 50–51); Mount Pleasant, New York, U.S.
- Other name: Diana Allen Booth
- Occupations: Dancer, actress
- Years active: 1917–1925
- Spouse: Samuel P. Booth (m. 1924)

Diana Allen (1898 – June 12, 1949) was a Swedish-American actress and Ziegfeld girl who starred in silent films such as 1921's Miss 139, which is now lost.

== Biography ==
Allen was born in Gotland, Sweden, in 1898 and came to the United States at the age of 5. While a high school student in New Haven, Connecticut, she began to perform with Eddie Wittstein. Her stage debut was in a vaudeville act called "Girls' Gamble" with Ned Wayburn. She later appeared in Miss 1917, the Ziegfeld Follies (1917–18), and Ziegfeld's Midnight Frolic.

Allen starred in a number of silent film shorts and features between 1918 and 1925. Her first feature film appearance was in Woman in 1918.

Allen married Samuel P. Booth on August 28, 1924, in Greenwich, Connecticut. Booth was president of the Interborough News Company, and previously had been in charge of circulation for newspapers including the Chicago Journal, New York Evening Journal and The New York Globe. He was over 30 years older than Allen. They did not have any children. Allen died in Mount Pleasant, New York, on June 12, 1949.

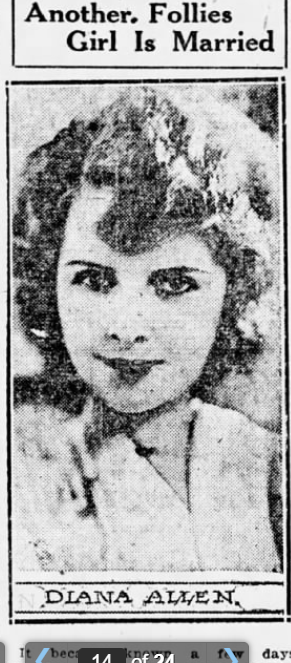
Diana Allen, blonde beauty of the Ziegfeld Follies chorus in New York

== Partial filmography ==
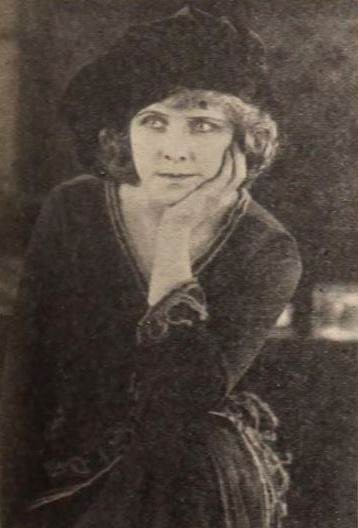
Allen in Miss 139.

- Woman (1918)
- Even as Eve (1920)
- Voices (1920)
- Man and Woman (1920)
- Heliotrope (1920) *lost film
- The Face at Your Window (1920)
- The Kentuckians (1921) *lost film
- The Conquest of Canaan (1921)
- Miss 139 (1921) *lost film
- The Way of a Maid (1921)
- Get-Rich-Quick Wallingford (1921) *lost film
- Beyond the Rainbow (1922) (was also film debut of Clara Bow)
- Divorce Coupons (1922)
- Man Wanted (or Male Wanted) (1922)
- The Beauty Shop (1922) *lost film
- Salome (1923) (film directed by Malcolm Strauss; not the Alla Nazimova film of the same name)
- The Exciters (1923) *lost film
- Flying Fists (Series of shorts with boxer Benny Leonard) (1924–25)
- Roulette (1924) * lost film
