= Kongo (film) =

1932 film

- Walter Huston and Lupe Vélez
- Directed by: William J. Cowen
- Screenplay by: Leon Gordon
- Based on: Kongo; 1926 play by Chester De Vonde; Kilbourn Gordon
- Produced by: Louis B. Mayer; Irving Thalberg
- Starring: Walter Huston; Lupe Vélez; Conrad Nagel; Virginia Bruce
- Cinematography: Harold Rosson
- Edited by: Conrad A. Nervig
- Distributed by: Metro-Goldwyn-Mayer
- Release date: October 1, 1932
- Running time: 86 minutes
- Country: United States
- Language: English

Kongo is a 1932 American pre-Code film directed by William J. Cowen and starring Walter Huston, Lupe Vélez, Conrad Nagel, and Virginia Bruce. It is an adaptation of the 1926 Broadway play of the same name that starred Huston as well. The film is also a remake of the 1928 silent film West of Zanzibar, which was based too on the 1926 play. That earlier film was directed by Tod Browning and stars Lon Chaney and Lionel Barrymore.

Kongo has rarely been seen in theaters since its original release, but in recent years it has been presented on television by Turner Classic Movies. On May 3, 2011, a DVD version of the film was released as part of the Warner Archive Collection series .

== Plot ==
"Deadlegs" Flint, an embittered paraplegic living in the Congo, controls local natives by dispensing to them small quantities of sugar and liquor (sometimes substituting the latter with kerosene). He also astonishes and frightens the natives by performing staged magic tricks, which create the illusion that he has supernatural powers. Assisting him with those tricks are his fiancée Tula, two thugs—Hogan and Cookie—and a loyal native, Fuzzy. Flint has spent the last 18 years plotting revenge against Gregg, a man who had crushed his spine in a fight before he ran away with Flint's wife. The crippled man since then has built an "80-mile circle" around his jungle compound, an area patrolled by his henchmen and where no one can enter or leave without Flint's consent. As part of his revenge plan, he also arranged years ago to have the infant daughter of Gregg and his former wife raised by nuns to be "clean in body and mind" within the safety and seclusion of a convent in Cape Town. Flint sends his man Hogan there to bring the daughter, Ann, to him. In Cape Town, Hogan disguises himself as a missionary and convinces Ann, now a young woman, to go with him to see her father Gregg.

By the time Ann arrives at Flint's compound, she has become a hardened alcoholic after being confined for months in a brothel in Zanzibar and forced to work as a prostitute. She continues to be held captive at the Kongo camp and does Flint's bidding for the daily servings of brandy he allows her to have. Each day too he takes sadistic delight in degrading and physically abusing the daughter of his archenemy. Later, a cynical, drug-addicted doctor named Kingsland arrives, and soon he and Ann fall in love. Flint needs Kingsland to be sober to operate on him to relieve the constant pain caused by his paralysis. To hasten his sobriety, Flint has the doctor bound with ropes, taken to the nearby swamp, and placed up to his neck in the leech-infested water so the parasites can suck the drugs or "poisons" out of his system. Flint also tolerates Ann's relationship with Kingsland because of its purifying effect on the doctor; nevertheless, he continues to ridicule her.

After Kingsland operates on Flint, Gregg arrives at the camp, summoned by Flint, who has stolen shipments of ivory from him. Flint hopes to have the ultimate revenge against Gregg by showing him his degraded daughter, having him killed, and then having Ann sacrificed as part of the natives' funeral ritual. Flint taunts Gregg until Gregg finally recognizes him as the person he once knew as Rutledge. The crippled man reminds him about running away with his wife after kicking Flint in the back and causing his paralysis. Flint then reveals how he has abused Gregg's daughter as part of his revenge plot, but Gregg proves that Ann is actually Flint's own daughter. Flint is stunned. After this revelation, Flint begs Gregg not to leave the compound or he will be killed by Fuzzy, who is patrolling the surrounding jungle and under orders to shoot Gregg if he sees him. Gregg ignores his old enemy's warning, departs, and Fuzzy kills him.

Now desperate to save Ann from the natives' sacrificial fire, Flint has Fuzzy guide her, Kingsland, Tula, and Cookie through an escape tunnel to the swamp. Flint remains behind and dies trying to keep angry natives at bay. Just before he is killed, he desperately prays that Ann will get away safely with Kingsland. Some time later, Flint's pet chimpanzee is shown finding the crippled man's necklace within the ashes of a pyre. Meanwhile, Ann and Kingsland are aboard a riverboat sailing downriver. As the couple waits to be married by the boat's captain, the film ends with Kingsland describing to her their destination, his small home in Sicily.

== Cast ==
- Walter Huston - "Deadlegs" Flint
- Lupe Vélez - Tula
- Conrad Nagel - Dr. Kingsland
- Virginia Bruce - Ann Whitehall
- C. Henry Gordon - Gregg (aka Whitehall)
- Mitchell Lewis - Hogan
- Forrester Harvey - Cookie Harris
- Curtis Nero - Fuzzy
- Everett Brown - Native Reporting to Gregg (uncredited in film)
- Charles Irwin - Carl (uncredited)
- Sarah Padden - Nun at Convent (uncredited)

== Crew ==
- Douglas Shearer - recording director

== Production notes ==
Certain exterior scenes in Kongo are recycled footage shot four years earlier for West of Zanzibar. That footage includes, for example, the scene when the "Juju" spirit frightens the African ivory bearers so Flint's men can steal the elephant tusks they drop while fleeing. Another scene employing recycled footage depicts the natives and the funeral pyre during the ritual sacrifice.

Kongo was filmed at MGM between August 4 and early September 1932. News updates in trade papers at the time confirm that production work on Kongo actually began several weeks ahead of another project at the studio, the romantic drama Red Dust starring Clark Gable, Jean Harlow, and Mary Astor. In fact, some of film sets for Kongo, which were designed by MGM's art director Cedric Gibbons, were also used for Red Dust.

== Reception ==
Many film critics and movie-industry publications in 1932 objected to what they viewed as the gruesome, salacious content of Kongo. In its distribution to various locations, especially in metropolitan areas like New York City, the film was often consigned to lesser theaters or houses and used as a filler on theater schedules until more highly anticipated or prestigious productions arrived. In its November 22 issue, the influential trade paper Variety states that Kongo "misses completely for the ace houses", adding "it was kept out of Loew's Broadway deluxer, the Capitol, and spotted into the Rialto as a stop-gap until Par's own 'Sign of the Cross'". In his overall assessment of Kongo for Variety, reviewer Abel Green describes the picture as essentially a tedious remake and a waste of good acting talent:

Another of those tropical, horror films, made more so by unnecessary gruesomeness and general lack of sympathy ... Huston is shown with a Karloff makeup as the crippled tyrant who rules the natives with voodoo buncombe ... The general bitterness of this thesis of hate and revenge almost wholly nullifies its entertainment value. And while it has its gripping moments of tense drama, there is much that is ridiculous, recurring every so often to the detriment of the sum total. Huston's histrionic assignment must necessarily be tense and dominating, with the result it reflects negatively so far as the rest of the support is concerned. So much so that one can hardly work up sympathy for the others. Nagel tries hard to keep his difficult assignment lucid and balanced, but it becomes silly. Same goes for Virginia Bruce as the victim of this hatred between her pseudo and actual father. Lupe Velez has little opportunity. The rest on a same par.

Another widely read trade paper at the time, The Film Daily, agreed with Green's general assessment of Kongo, describing it as a "far-fetched tropical melodrama" with a "disagreeable theme", one replete with "squalor" and "high-tension hokum that makes the affair hard to believe". The monthly The New Movie Magazine, which promoted itself in 1932 as having the "Largest Circulation of Any Screen Magazine in the World", was not as directly critical of Kongo as the previously cited publications. The popular fan magazine, however, in its November edition did prepare its readers for Walter Huston's appearance in the film: "Huston's make-up is one that has proved rather painful. Scars cover almost his entire face and his features are pulled out of shape so that he is almost unrecognizable." Mordaunt Hall, the respected critic for The New York Times, agreed with such negative comments about Huston's disturbing "exaggerated make-up". Hall in his review blames that excess on Director William Cowan, whom he characterizes as "obviously not a disciple of restraint".

The review of Kongo in the December 1932 edition of Photoplay provides some additional insight into reactions by fan-based publications. Among the nation's oldest movie magazines, the Chicago monthly also found Kongo a misuse of its cast's abilities and an inferior remake of West of Zanzibar. The magazine in its review also advises adult theatergoers to keep their children away from the film:

AS lurid a tale of hatred and revenge as ever Lon Chaney played in, but without his genius to bring it to life. Walter Huston in a role unsuited to his personality; Lupe Velez with little chance to act; Virginia Bruce's prettiness sacrificed to a sordid part. For those who like their jungle stories filled with horror, here is strong meat, but children should stay home and study their geography.

Many theater owners in 1932, known then as "exhibitors" in the film industry, cautioned fellow exhibitors about screening Kongo. Weeks after the release of the feature, Bert Silver, owner of Silver Family Theatre in Greenville, Michigan, complains in the trade weekly Motion Picture Herald, "Good acting but terrible story. Pleased no one." Edith Fordyce, owner of the Princess Theatre in Selma, Louisiana, warns her colleagues too in the same publication. "Don't play [Kongo] on Sunday", she reports, "I did so, to my sorrow". Fordyce then adds, "It did not draw and those who saw it complained." Several months later, other exhibitors continued to express regret for showing the film. In the March 25, 1933 issue of Motion Picture Herald, Robert Yancey of Cotter, Arkansas, describes the film as a box-office disaster at his Paradise Theatre: "Not the type of picture people will pay good money to see. No business at all."
