= Charles A. Logue =

American screenwriter

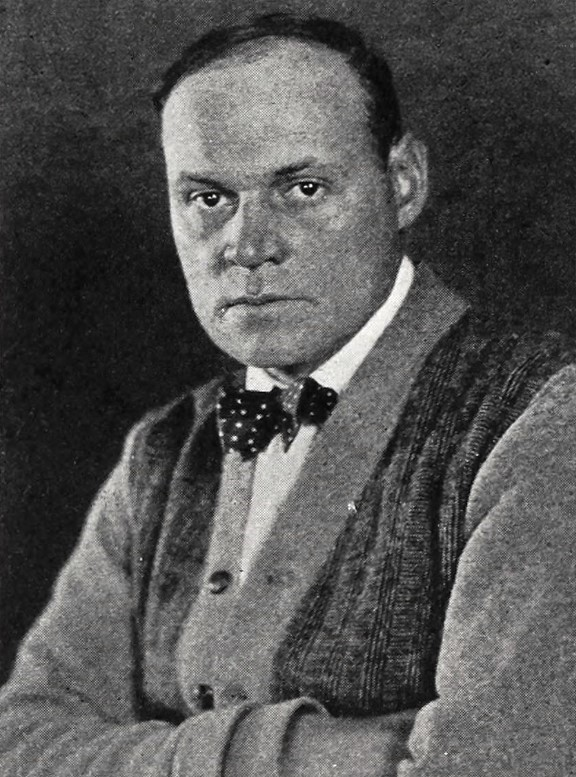
- From a 1925 magazine
- Born: February 8, 1889; Boston, Massachusetts, United States
- Died: August 2, 1938 (aged 49); Venice, California, United States
- Occupations: Director, Writer
- Years active: 1916 -1938 (film)

Charles A. Logue (February 8, 1889 – August 2, 1938) was an American screenwriter and occasional film director active in the silent and early sound era.

== Selected filmography ==
- The Duchess of Doubt (1917)
- A Wife by Proxy (1917)
- Outwitted (1917)
- The Kingdom of Youth (1918)
- A Scream in the Night (1919)
- What Women Will Do (1921)
- Heroes and Husbands (1922)
- The Woman Who Fooled Herself (1922)
- Gay and Devilish (1922)
- The Tents of Allah (1923)
- Straight Through (1925)
- Prisoners of the Storm (1926)
- Unknown Treasures (1926)
- Forbidden Waters (1926)
- The Love Toy (1926)
- Devil's Dice (1926)
- Her Man o' War (1926)
- Hard Fists (1927)
- Red Clay (1927)
- Back to God's Country (1927)
- Cheating Cheaters (1927)
- The Heart of a Follies Girl (1928)
- The Michigan Kid (1928)
- Man, Woman and Wife (1929)
- Whispering Winds (1929)
- Fast Companions (1932)
- Black Beauty (1933)
- Ticket to a Crime (1934)
- Sing Sing Nights (1934)
- Home on the Range (1935)
- Make a Million (1935)
- The Hoosier Schoolmaster (1935)
- Renfrew of the Royal Mounted (1937)
- The Marines Are Here (1938)
- On the Great White Trail (1938)

== Bibliography ==
- Munden, Kenneth White. The American Film Institute Catalog of Motion Pictures Produced in the United States, Part 1. University of California Press, 1997.
