= B. A. Rolfe =

American musician

Background information
- Born: Benjamin Albert Rolfe; October 24, 1879, Brasher Falls, New York, U.S.
- Died: April 23, 1956 (aged 76) Walpole, Massachusetts
- Occupations: Musician, bandleader, movie producer
- Instrument: Trumpet

Benjamin Albert Rolfe (October 24, 1879 – April 23, 1956) was an American musician known as "The Boy Trumpet Wonder" who went on to be a bandleader, recording artist, radio personality, and film producer.

== Biography ==
He was born on October 24, 1879, in Brasher Falls, New York, the son of Albert Rolfe, founder of one of the first dance orchestras in the United States.

At 8 years of age he played the piccolo and cornet in his father's band, touring the U.S. east coast and Europe. After high school, he worked as a musical clown in a traveling circus until joining the Majestic Theater Orchestra in Utica, New York. At the Utica Conservatory of Music he was head of the brass instrument department. Drawn back to show business in the early part of the 20th century, he worked in vaudeville, producing a revue and serving as bandleader.

In 1914, Rolfe turned his talents to the fledgling motion picture business, establishing his own production company, Rolfe Photoplays Inc. Although he filmed in California, Rolfe's productions were primarily made in and around Fort Lee, New Jersey, and distributed through an agreement with Louis B. Mayer's Metro Pictures Corporation. Rolfe's company produced more than 50 silent films, several of which were collaborations with director/screenwriter Oscar A. C. Lund, including the 1916 drama Dorian's Divorce starring Lionel Barrymore.

He acquired Dyreda Art Film Company in 1915.

His film company's last production was the 15-part mystery serial, The Master Mystery (1919), starring Harry Houdini. Mounting financial difficulties resulted in Rolfe Photoplays Inc. going out of business and before 1920 he was making a living producing and directing films for Metro Pictures and other small independent production companies such as A. H. Fischer, Inc., for which he produced Even as Eve and directed Man and Woman, both released in 1920. Rolfe's last directorial effort was A. H. Fischer's Miss 139 (1921), notable in that he managed to get a credible performance from star Diana Allen, the less than talented but dazzlingly beautiful former Ziegfeld Follies girl. She also starred in Man and Woman.

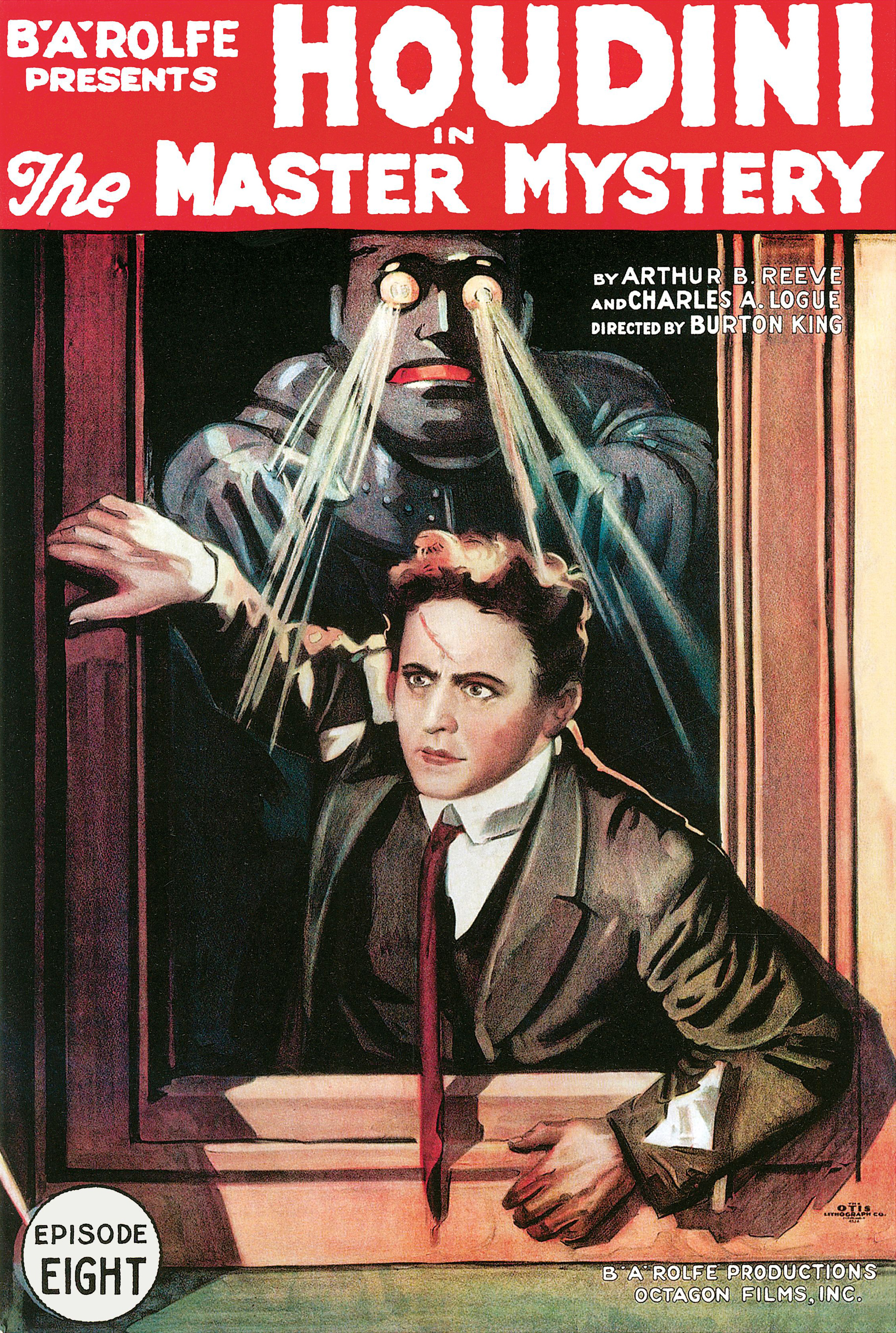
B.A. Rolfe's The Master Mystery (1919)

After leaving the film business, B.A. Rolfe quickly reestablished himself as a performing soloist, music instructor and vaudeville producer. He worked with Vincent Lopez in 1924 and 1925. Inspired by Paul Whiteman, by 1926 he had assembled his own New York City dance orchestra to perform at a Broadway cabaret called the Palais D'Or. Soon billed as "B.A. Rolfe (Trumpet Virtuoso) and his Palais D'Or Orchestra," by 1928 he was performing on radio and recording as "B.A. Rolfe and his Lucky Strike Orchestra" for Edison Records. Rolfe was an exclusive Edison artist from 1926 through October, 1929, when Edison suspended its recording operation.

Rolfe made electrical transcriptions in the early 1930s and made two Vitaphone shorts in 1934 and in 1935. In 1935–36, Rolfe was the leader of The Goodrich Silvertown Orchestra. His radio broadcasts ran until the late 1930s during which time he and his orchestra played music with the sponsorship of Believe It or Not! on NBC. Rolfe also narrated the shows, providing an on-air description of a Robert Ripley tale of wonder. With the onset of World War II, Rolfe organized an all-female orchestra to perform patriotic songs.

At the age of 76, he died of cancer in Walpole, Massachusetts.

== Selected filmography ==
- Destiny (1915)
- Cora (1915)
- Satan Sanderson (1915)
- The Trail of the Shadow (1917)
- Miss Robinson Crusoe (1917)
- The Duchess of Doubt (1917)
- The Girl Without a Soul (1917)
- The Barricade (1917)
- The Outsider (1917)
- The Voice of Conscience (1917)
- The Winding Trail (1918)
- The Claim (1918)
- Breakers Ahead (1918)
- The Belle of the Season (1919)
- Easy to Make Money (1919)
- A Scream in the Night (1919)
- Love Without Question (1920) an Old Dark House mystery
- A Woman's Business (1920)
- B. A. Rolfe Off the Record (1934)

== Listen to ==
- WFMU: Thomas Edison's Attic: B. A. Rolfe and his Palais D'or Orchestra with vocalist J. Donald Parker: "One Summer Night" (1927) (19 minutes in)

== See also ==
- Your Hit Parade
