= Victory (1996 film) =

1996 film directed by Mark Peploe

- DVD cover
- Directed by: Mark Peploe
- Screenplay by: Mark Peploe; Frederick Seidel
- Adaptation by: Mark Peploe
- Based on: Victory by Joseph Conrad
- Produced by: Jeremy Thomas; Bob Weinstein; Harvey Weinstein; Simon Bosanquet
- Starring: Willem Dafoe; Irène Jacob; Sam Neill; Rufus Sewell
- Narrated by: Bill Paterson
- Cinematography: Bruno de Keyzer
- Edited by: Michael Bradsell; Tony Lawson
- Music by: Richard Hartley
- Production companies: Recorded Picture Company; Canal+ Studio Babelsberg
- Distributed by: Miramax Films
- Release date: 1996 (USA)
- Running time: 99 minutes
- Countries: France; Germany; United Kingdom
- Languages: English; Indonesian

Victory is a 1996 French-German drama suspense film directed by Mark Peploe, written by Peploe and Frederick Seidel, and starring Willem Dafoe, Irène Jacob, Sam Neill and Rufus Sewell. It is based on the 1915 novel by Joseph Conrad.

The novel had been adapted into film on multiple previous occasions, including a 1919 silent version directed by Maurice Tourneur and featuring Jack Holt, Seena Owen, Lon Chaney Sr., and Wallace Beery; the 1930 William Wellman directed Dangerous Paradise starring Nancy Carroll, Richard Arlen and Warner Oland; and the 1940 version featuring Fredric March, Betty Field, and Sir Cedric Hardwicke.

== Plot summary ==
Through a business misadventure, the European Axel Heyst ends up living on an island in what is now Indonesia with a Chinese assistant Wang. Heyst visits a nearby island where a female band is playing at a hotel owned by Mr. Schomberg. Schomberg attempts to force himself sexually on one of the band members, Alma. Alma is about to be sold to Schomberg by the corrupt leader/director of the band who has enslaved the women for prostitution. She begs Heyst to help her. Having sworn off close relationships because of his past, he is challenged by her request, but agrees to help her. He escapes from the island with Alma, and they go back to his island and eventually become lovers. Schomberg seeks revenge by attempting to frame Heyst for the "murder" of a man who had died of natural causes and later by sending three desperadoes Pedro, Martin Ricardo, and Mr. Jones to Heyst's island with a lie about treasure hidden on the island. Upon their arrival at the island, much intrigue ensues.

In a climactic scene, Jones kills Pedro and then Ricardo; Alma is also shot and dies in the arms of Axel. After burning his compound and burying Alma, Axel disappears from the island but is rumored to have later been seen as a drifter in San Francisco and other ports of call. Alma's victory, in death, is having saved Axel's life in that he has again made connections with others.

== Cast ==
- Willem Dafoe as Axel Heyst
- Sam Neill as Mr. Jones
- Irène Jacob as Alma
- Rufus Sewell as Martin Ricardo
- Jean Yanne as Mr. Schomberg
- Ho Yi as Wang
- Bill Paterson as Capt. Davidson
- Irm Hermann as Mrs. Schomberg
- Graziano Marcelli as Pedro
- Hansi Jochmann as Mrs. Zangiacomo
- Simon Callow as Zangiacomo
- Michael Lee as Chinese Gentleman
- Leonard Maguire as Old Trader McNab

== Production ==
The principal photography of the movie were done at Situbondo and Asembagus regency in East Java, Indonesia. Some depiction of old Surabaya were also done in the same place.
