= Cyclone Higgins, D.D. =

1918 silent American comedy-drama film, directed by Christy Cabanne

- Directed by: Christy Cabanne
- Written by: Christy Cabanne
- Starring: Francis X. Bushman; Beverly Bayne; Baby Ivy Ward
- Cinematography: William Fildew
- Edited by: Mildred Richter
- Production company: Metro Pictures
- Release date: May 13, 1918 (US)
- Running time: 5 reels
- Country: United States
- Language: English

Cyclone Higgins, D.D. is a 1918 silent American comedy-drama film, directed by Christy Cabanne. It stars Francis X. Bushman, Beverly Bayne, and Baby Ivy Ward, and was released on May 13, 1918.

== Cast list ==
- Francis X. Bushman as Cyrus "Cyclone" Higgins, D.D.
- Beverly Bayne as Sally Phillips
- Baby Ivy Ward as Dorothea
- Charles Fang as Johnathon Moses Chi Wu Lung
- John Prescott as Jasper Stone
- Helen Dunbar as Mary Higgins
- Eugene Borden as Owen Chase
- Sue Balfour as The Widow Pryor
- Pop Kennard as Old Settler
- Robert Carson as Sheriff

== Plot ==
Cyrus Higgins, an itinerant preacher, arrives in Yellville, accompanied by his faithful Chinese servant, Johnathon Moses Chi Wu Lung. He meets Sally Phelps, the town belle, and is immediately smitten with her. When he sees the deputy sheriff, Jasper Stone, trying to take advantage of Sally, Higgins intervenes and forces Stone to apologize, earning the deputy's enmity. When the sheriff begins to put pressure on his deputy to solve the recent series of burglaries, Stone frames Sally's father, Abner, for the crimes. With her father in jail, Stone goes to the Phillips home to abduct Sally, but she has fled, finding sanctuary at Higgins' home. Being a gentlemen, Higgins and Wu Lung sleep outside in the back yard, leaving the house to Sally. However, Stone spreads rumors that the two spent the night together. This leads to a fight between the two men, which Higgins wins handily, earning him the nickname, "Cyclone". Afterwards, Sally is taken under the wing of Higgins sister, Mary, who sends her off to school. In her absence, Higgins realizes the depth of his feelings for her, and when she returns, the two are married.

== Production ==
In May 1918, Metro announced that Francis X. Bushman would be appearing in the film. Shortly after, it was revealed that Beverly Bayne would be his co-star and the film was scheduled for a May 13 release. Christy Cabanne was set to write the screenplay, and four-year old "Baby Ivy Ward" was also scheduled to appear in the film. Others said to be cast were Charles Fang, one of the few Chinese actors working in film at the time, John Prescott, Helen Dunbar, Eugene Borden, Sue Balfour, and Robert Carson. A replica of a Tennessee mountain village was re-created in Rockland County, New York for filming the movie's exterior scenes.

== Reception ==
Motion Picture News gave the film a positive review, calling it a "Another triumph for Bushman and Bayne", and they called Cabanne's screenplay a "masterpiece". Photoplay also gave the film a good review, praising Bushman and Bayne, calling it the "finest entertainment of their long careers", and also singled out Baby Ivy Ward for her performance.
