= Victory (novel) =

1915 novel by Joseph Conrad

Victory: An Island Tale
- Cover of the first UK edition
- Author: Joseph Conrad
- Language: English
- Genre: Psychological novel
- Publisher: Methuen (UK); Doubleday Page & Co (US)
- Publication date: 24 September 1915
- Publication place: London, England, United Kingdom
- Media type: Print (hardcover)
- OCLC: 220335838

Victory (also published as Victory: An Island Tale) is a psychological novel by Joseph Conrad first published on 24 September 1915, through which Conrad achieved "popular success".

The novel's "most striking formal characteristic is its shifting narrative and temporal perspective" with the first section from the viewpoint of a sailor, the second from omniscient perspective of Axel Heyst, the third from an interior perspective from Heyst, and the final section has an omniscient narrator.

It has been adapted into film a number of times.

== Plot ==
Axel Heyst, the novel's protagonist, was raised by his widowed father, a Swedish philosopher, in London, England, and never knew his mother. The atmosphere of Heyst's home, with his father's ruthless pursuit of truth and pessimistic view of humanity, warps Heyst's mind, and after his father dies, he leaves England and becomes a rootless wanderer. This eventually leads him to the Southeastern Asia, especially to what is now Indonesia, including Surabaya—a port in the then-Dutch colony of Java.

Eventually, however, human feelings are awoken in Heyst by the plight of Captain Morrison, who faces the confiscation of his ship, and loss of his livelihood, because he cannot pay a fine levied by the Portuguese authorities. Heyst intervenes with a loan for a paltry sum, which establishes a relationship, and Heyst is unable to break this bond. This eventually leads to the establishment of The Tropical Belt Coal Company, of which Heyst becomes the manager, although he has no interest in this enterprise. Morrison subsequently visits England where he dies. Soon after the coal company goes bankrupt. Heyst however, remains at the site of the derelict coal mine, on the island of Samburan. There he lives the life of a hermit, with his Chinese servant, Wang.

Later Heyst's compassion is aroused again when he encounters the young woman Lena in Surabaya on the Island of Java, where she is playing in an all-woman orchestra. Lena is being mistreated by the orchestra's conductor and his sadistic wife, and threatened with sexual violence by Schomberg, the owner of the hotel, where the orchestra plays. Heyst, with the aid of Schomberg's down-trodden wife, absconds with Lena, to Samburan.

Schomberg's jealous rage at losing Lena, along with his fear of a mysterious trio of visitors, Mr Jones, Martin Ricardo, and Pedro, lead him to suggest to this trio that Heyst caused the death of Morrison, and has great wealth hidden on Samburan.

Taken in by Schomberg's lies, the trio set out for Samburan, but get lost at sea and barely make it to the island. They plan to kill Heyst after they discover where his money is hidden. Only Ricardo is aware of Lena's existence and Jones has a pathological hatred of women. Soon after they arrive, Martin Ricardo attacks Lena, but she is stronger than him, causing Ricardo to fall in love with her. In order to try to protect Heyst, Lena encourages this infatuation. This eventually leads to her accidental death, when Jones realizes that Ricardo is double-crossing him and attempts to kill Ricardo. In despair, Heyst commits suicide. Jones kills Ricardo and then accidentally drowns. Their assistant, Pedro, is shot by Wang and dies.

== Reception and impact ==
In Notes on My Books, Conrad wrote of his "mixed feelings" about the initial reception of the book which had been published while Europe had been engaged in fighting World War I. The initial reception of the work had considered it "a melodramatic, rather Victorian novel, representing Conrad's artistic decline." However, later critiques have described it as "a highly complex allegorical work whose psychological landscape and narrative structure lay the groundwork for the modern novel." The New York Times, however, called it "an uneven book" and "more open to criticism than most of Mr. Conrad's best work."

It is possible that Axel Heyst is based on a character in the play Axël by Auguste Villiers de l'Isle-Adam, published in 1890, "who detaches himself from life, preferring death to love". The character of Heyst has also been compared to Shakespeare's Hamlet while the story itself alludes to The Tempest and the ending of the work has been compared to "an Elizabethan stage play where the stage is clogged with corpses" John Batchelor also points out that "'Heyst' rhymes with Christ and ... a number of hints [suggest] that Heyst is to be seen as a Christ figure". Allen Simmons states that the character of Lena was shaped by Therese from the 1894 French novel Le Lys rouge (The Red Lily), by Anatole France. Lena is short for Magdalene and this identifies her with the biblical "harlot restored to purity and elevated to sainthood by repentance and faith". She is also called "Alma" "an Egyptian dancing girl who performs for men's pleasure".

Adam Gillon and Raymond Brebach have proposed that Vladimir Nabokov's rejection of Conrad's "souvenir-shop style, and bottled ships and shell necklaces of romanticist cliches" resulted in Conrad's Victory being "one of the principal sources of inspiration" for Lolita through what they call "typical Nabokovian reversal."

Joan Didion was a great admirer of Victory, calling it "maybe my favorite book in the world." Didion said of the novel, "there’s this fantastic distancing of the narrative, except that when you’re in the middle of it, it remains very immediate. It’s incredibly skillful. I have never started a novel—I mean except the first, when I was starting a novel just to start a novel—I’ve never written one without rereading Victory. It opens up the possibilities of a novel. It makes it seem worth doing."

== Adaptations ==
The novel has been adapted to film multiple times including a 1919 silent version directed by Maurice Tourneur featuring Jack Holt, Seena Owen, Lon Chaney, Sr., and Wallace Beery; the 1930 William Wellman-directed Dangerous Paradise, starring Nancy Carroll, Richard Arlen and Warner Oland; the 1940 version, directed by John Cromwell, featuring Fredric March, Betty Field, and Sir Cedric Hardwicke; a 1987 West German film, Devil's Paradise, starring Jürgen Prochnow, Suzanna Hamilton and Sam Waterston; and a 1996 version directed by Mark Peploe, with Willem Dafoe, Sam Neill, Irène Jacob, and Rufus Sewell.

Richard Rodney Bennett composed an opera, to a libretto by Beverley Cross, based on the novel. It was premiered at the Royal Opera House, Covent Garden on 13 April 1970.

In March 1976 Sydney Pollack was reportedly working on a version, which was never made.

British dramatist Harold Pinter prepared a screenplay for a film, never made, from which the BBC broadcast a radio adaptation in 2015.

The novel's lines regarding the use of reason are quoted in Episode 5 of the second season of the Netflix series Mindhunter.

The novel is thought to have inspired the Bob Dylan song Black Diamond Bay.
