= Victory (1940 film) =

- Theatrical poster
- Directed by: John Cromwell
- Written by: John L. Balderston
- Based on: Victory by Joseph Conrad
- Produced by: Anthony Veiller
- Starring: Fredric March; Cedric Hardwicke; Betty Field
- Cinematography: Leo Tover
- Edited by: William Shea
- Music by: Frederick Hollander
- Production company: Paramount Pictures
- Distributed by: Paramount Pictures
- Release date: December 21, 1940; (New York City)
- Running time: 79 minutes
- Country: United States
- Language: English

Victory is a 1940 American adventure film directed by John Cromwell and starring Fredric March, Cedric Hardwicke and Betty Field. It was based on the popular 1915 novel by Joseph Conrad. On the eve of the American entry into World War II, Conrad's story of a hermit on an island invaded by thugs was refashioned into a call for intervention in the war in Europe at the height of American isolationism.

== Plot ==
Hendrik Heyst is an intellectual British recluse who has vowed to close himself off from the world and now lives alone on an island in the Dutch East Indies. However, he is forced to break this promise to himself when traveling showgirl Alma, also fleeing from the world, is threatened by three murderous scavengers. The villains are led by Mr. Jones, who has a Cockney sidekick named Martin Ricardo whom Jones treats with sexual sadism. The villains switch their attention from Alma to Heyst when they find that Heyst has untold wealth to plunder.

== Cast ==
- Fredric March as Hendrik Heyst
- Betty Field as Alma
- Sir Cedric Hardwicke as Mr. Jones
- Jerome Cowan as Martin Ricardo
- Sig Rumann as Mr. Schomberg
- Margaret Wycherly as Mrs. Schomberg
- Fritz Feld as Señor Makanoff
- Lionel Royce as Pedro
- Alan Ladd as Heyst Jnr

== Production ==
Paramount owned the film rights to Joseph Conrad's novel and filmed the story in 1919 as Victory and again in 1930 as Dangerous Paradise.

In July 1939, it was reported that Marc Connelly was writing a script for a film to be produced by William Le Baron and possibly starring John Howard. Paramount's wished to build Howard, who had been starring in the studio's Bulldog Drummond films, into a star. By November, John L. Balderstone was working on the script. Anthony Veillier was named producer and John Cromwell was hired as the director. In February 1940, Paramount announced Ida Lupino as the female lead, with Charles Boyer wanted for the male lead. However, neither actor appeared in the film, and in March 1940, Fredric March agreed to star. The female lead was given to Betty Field, who had been starring in Elmer Rice's Two on an Island on Broadway.

Filming began in May 1940 and was finished by early July.

Shortly after filming was completed, Paramount was reportedly considering a biopic of Conrad to be played by March, but no film resulted.

== Reception ==
In its review of Victory, Variety wrote: "This film version of Joseph Conrad's novel impresses with several strongly individual performances rather than with the basic movement of the story itself."

In a contemporary review for The New York Times, critic Bosley Crowther wrote: "[Victory] lacks most of the opaque and brooding philosophy of the original, shears away at least half of the novel's meandering contents, avoids the tragic ending which Conrad so grimly contrived and boils down in essence to a slow and sultry melodrama of love and villainy in the South Seas. You have seen its kind a dozen times before. The only things that distinguish it are a star cast and smooth direction. ... There is a lot of cold suspense packed into the one big episode of 'Victory,' but it is of the bubble variety. When it is broken there's nothing left."

Harrison's Reports called the film "[a] strong but somewhat sordid drama, suitable only for adults. The direction is skillful, the acting realistic, and the production values good; but the story is somewhat brutal."

Film Daily described Victory as "at all times gripping and exciting" and called Fredric March "highly effective."

John Mosher of The New Yorker called the film "definitely expert, with a proper allotment of excitement and atmosphere," although he found the later scenes "too bald" in their simplification of the novel.

Despite the generally positive reviews, Victory fared poorly at the box office.
