= Mildred Richter =

American film editor and screenwriter

- Born: Caroline Mildred Richter; July 8, 1899; New York, USA
- Died: November 15, 1972 (aged 73); California, USA
- Occupation(s): Film editor, screenwriter
- Spouse(s): Jerome Storm (div.); Sherman Spear (div.)
- Relatives: Rose Richter (sister)

Mildred Richter was an American film editor and screenwriter active during Hollywood's silent era.

== Biography ==
Mildred was born in New York to Girard Richter and Henrietta Wolff, and was the second-youngest of the couple's five children. Two of her sisters, Louise and Rose, would also grow up to be film editors.

Mildred began working as a film editor in Hollywood by the mid-1910s, and her first known assignment was cutting 1917's The Slacker. While working as an editor at Thomas H. Ince's studio, she met director Jerome Storm; the pair tied the knot in 1921. They had a son together before divorcing two years later after Storm left Richter and returned to live with his mother.

Rose appears to have taken a few years off after her divorce to raise her son, Jerome Jr. She returned to her work in 1927 when she helped cut Wings, and would work on at least two other films, His Last Haul and Love in the Desert. Her sole writing credit was on 1928's Taxi 13.

== Selected filmography ==
As editor:

- Love in the Desert (1929)
- His Last Haul (1928)
- Wings (1927)
- Cyclone Higgins, D.D. (1918)
- National Red Cross Pageant (1917)
- Draft 258 (1917)
- The Slacker (1917)

As writer:

- Taxi 13 (1928)
