= A Magdalene of the Hills =

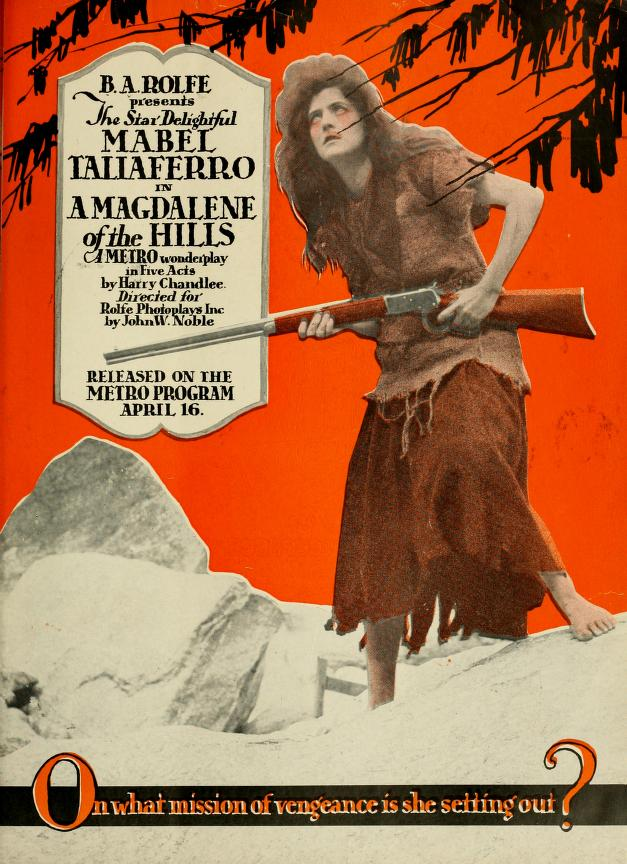
- Directed by: John W. Noble
- Written by: Harry Chandlee (story); June Mathis (scenario)
- Produced by: B. A. Rolfe
- Starring: Mabel Taliaferro; William Garwood
- Cinematography: Herbert Oswald Carleton
- Distributed by: Metro Pictures Corporation
- Release date: April 18, 1917
- Running time: 5 reels
- Country: United States
- Language: Silent (English intertitles)

A Magdalene of the Hills is a 1917 American silent drama film directed by John W. Noble and starring William Garwood as Eric Southward, Mabel Taliaferro, and Frank Montgomery.

The film today is lost.

== Cast ==
- Mabel Taliaferro as Renie Mathis
- William Garwood as Eric Southard
- Frank Montgomery as Old Mathis
- William B. Davidson as Bud Weaver
- William Black as Herbert Grayson
- Charles Brown as Len Mathis
