= A Woman's Awakening =

1917 film

- Directed by: Chester Withey
- Written by: Frank E. Woods
- Starring: Seena Owen; Kate Bruce; Spottiswoode Aitken
- Cinematography: David Abel
- Production company: Fine Arts Film Company
- Distributed by: Triangle Distributing
- Release date: March 25, 1917
- Running time: 50 minutes
- Country: United States
- Languages: Silent; English intertitles

A Woman's Awakening is a 1917 American silent drama film directed by Chester Withey and starring Seena Owen, Kate Bruce and Spottiswoode Aitken.

== Plot ==
A young naive girl comes to the big city where she is negatively influenced by her superficial friends. She is guided into marriage with a worthless man who abuses her and spends her money. The man is eventually killed by the lead character's mother.

== Cast ==
- Seena Owen as Paula Letchworth
- Kate Bruce as Mrs. Letchworth
- Allan Sears as Allen Cotter
- Spottiswoode Aitken as Judge Cotter
- Charles K. Gerrard as Lawrence Topham
- Alma Rubens as Cousin Kate
- Jennie Lee as Mammie

== Bibliography ==
- Langman, Larry. American Film Cycles: The Silent Era. Greenwood Publishing, 1998.
