= Draft 258 =

1917 silent film directed by Christy Cabanne

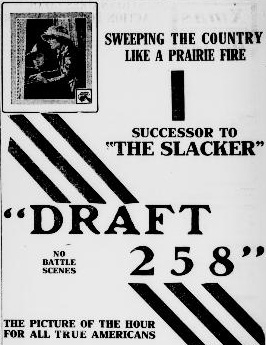
- Newspaper advertisement for the film
- Directed by: Christy Cabanne
- Written by: June Mathis; Christy Cabanne
- Starring: Mabel Taliaferro; Walter Miller; Earl Brunswick
- Cinematography: William E. Fildew
- Edited by: Mildred Richter
- Production company: Metro Pictures
- Distributed by: Metro Pictures
- Release date: November 15, 1917 (US)
- Running time: 4 reels
- Country: United States
- Language: Silent (English intertitles)

Draft 258 is a 1917 American silent drama film directed by Christy Cabanne. It stars Mabel Taliaferro, Walter Miller, and Earl Brunswick, and was released on November 15, 1917. It is a lost film.

== Cast ==
- Mabel Taliaferro as Mary Alden
- Walter Miller as John Graham
- Earl Brunswick as Matthew Alden
- Eugene Borden as George Alden
- Sue Balfour as Mrs. Alden
- William H. Tooker as Amiel Van Bierman
- Camilla Dalberg as Marcita Blein
- Baby Ivy Ward as Belgian child
- Sidney D'Albrook as Italian
- Robert Anderson as Nicolo Reisso

== Reception ==
The Times-Union called it a "big screen sensation", and applauded the re-enactments of the military engagements created by Cabanne. The Deming Headlight praised it as "the finest war picture ever produced". They were complimentary of the photography, acting, with the latter being marked for realism, without the "sickening sentimentality that distinguishes so many of the screen productions of the present day." The San Bernardino County Sun gave the film a positive review. They opined it was "a superb production suitable to its great central idea and its thrilling and absorbing story."

== Preservation ==
With no prints of Draft 258 located in any film archives, it is a lost film.
