= June Mathis =

American screenwriter, producer and film studio executive

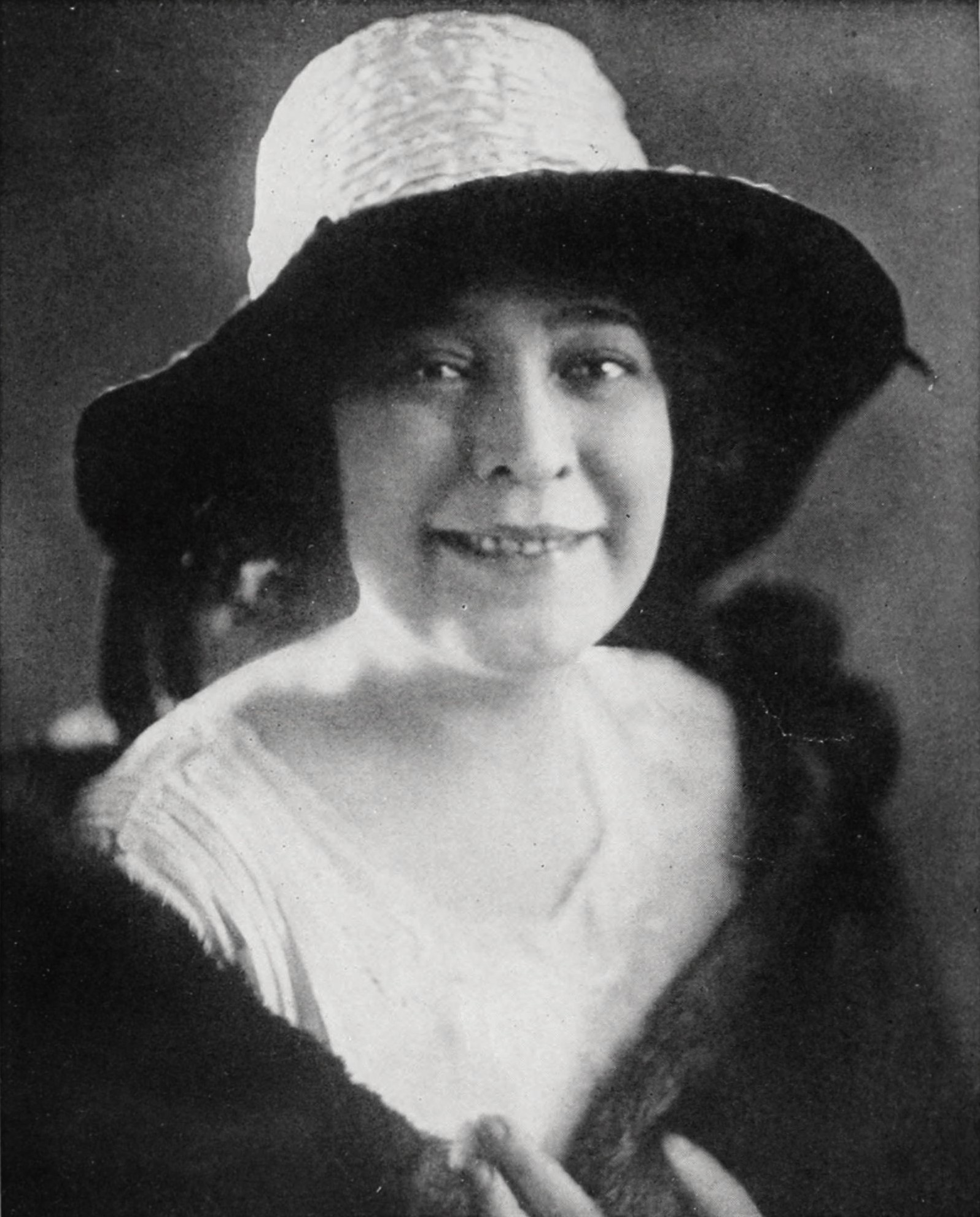
- Mathis, c.1920
- Born: June Beulah Hughes; January 30, 1887; Leadville, Colorado, U.S.
- Died: July 26, 1927 (aged 40); New York City, U.S.
- Resting place: Hollywood Forever Cemetery
- Years active: 1916–1927
- Known for: Discovering Rudolph Valentino
- Spouse: Sylvano Balboni (m. 1924)

June Mathis (born June Beulah Hughes, January 30, 1887 – July 26, 1927) was an American screenwriter. Mathis was the first female executive for Metro/MGM and at only 35, she was the highest paid executive in Hollywood. In 1926 she was voted the third most influential woman in Hollywood, behind Mary Pickford and Norma Talmadge. Mathis is best remembered for discovering Rudolph Valentino and writing such films as The Four Horsemen of the Apocalypse (1921), and Blood and Sand (1922).

== Early life ==
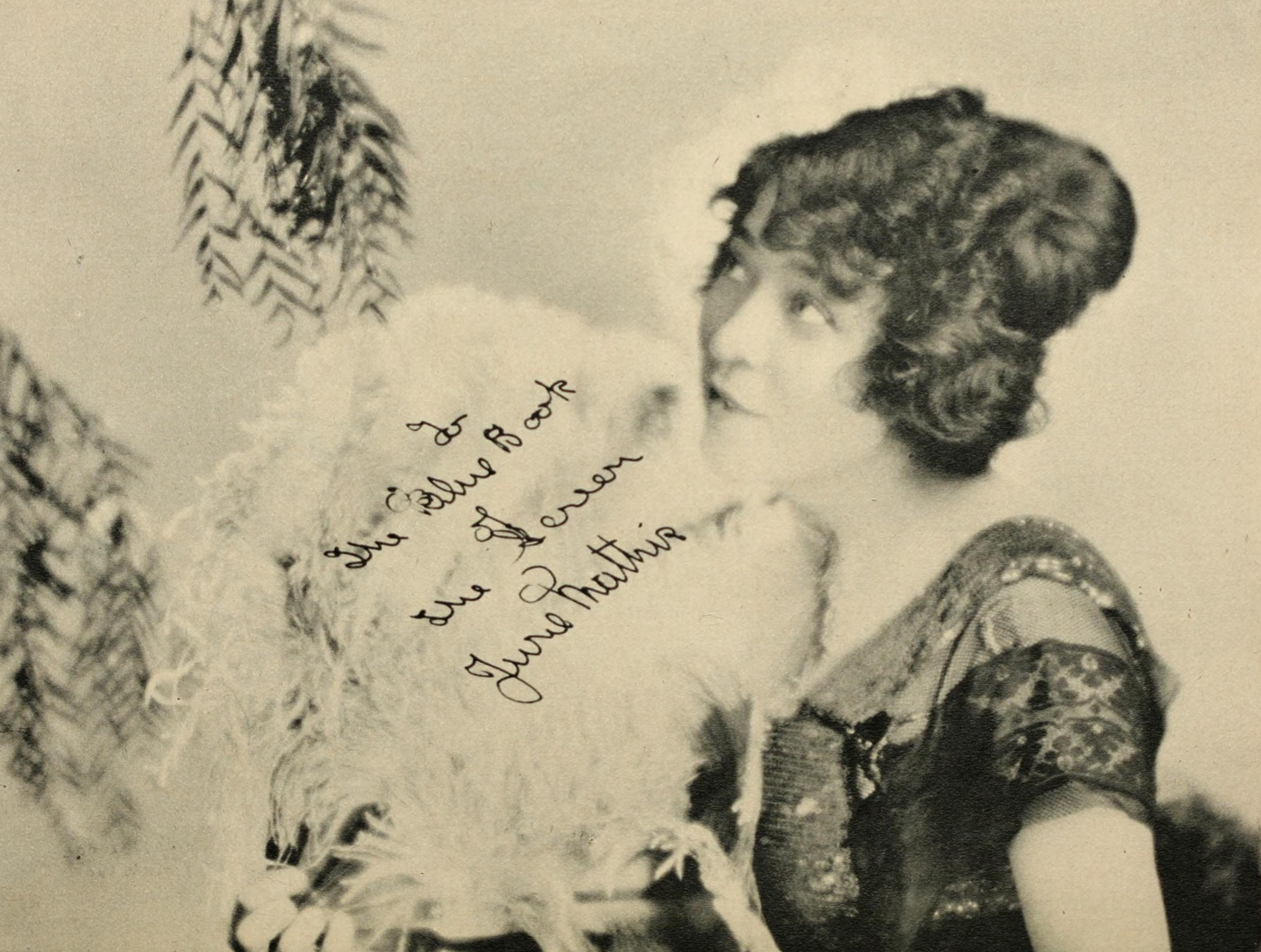
Photograph published 1923

June Mathis was born June Beulah Hughes in Leadville, Colorado, the only child of Virginia Ruth and Dr. Philip Hughes. Her parents divorced when she was seven and her mother remarried to William D. Mathis, a widower with three children whose name she would eventually adopt as a stage name.

She had been a sickly child and believed she healed herself through her sheer force of will. She believed everything was mental and everyone had certain vibrations, stating, "If you are vibrating in the right place, you will inevitably come in contact with the others who can help you. It's like tuning in on your radio. If you get the right wave-length, you have your station."

Mathis was educated in Salt Lake City and San Francisco. It was while in San Francisco she gained her first stage experience, dancing and doing imitations in vaudeville. At the age of 12 she joined a traveling company and at 17 became an ingenue, performing with Ezra Kendall in The Vinegar Buyer.

Later she appeared in several Broadway shows and toured for four seasons with the female impersonator Julian Eltinge in the widely popular show The Fascinating Widow. Supporting her now twice-widowed mother, she would continue to perform in theatre for the next 13 years.

== Career ==
=== Screenwriting ===
Mathis was determined to become a screenwriter and, accompanied with her mother, she moved to New York City, where she studied writing and went to the movies in the evenings. She entered a screenwriting competition; but despite not winning, her entry was so impressive it did bring job offers.

Her first script, House of Tears, would be directed by Edwin Carewe in 1915 and led to a contract in 1918 with Metro studios, later to be merged into MGM. As one of the first screenwriters to include details such as stage directions and physical settings in her work, Mathis saw scenarios as a way to make movies into more of an art form. Much of the standard screenwriting styles can be attributed to her. Mathis later credited her success to a strong concentration on plot and theme: "No story that did not possess a theme has ever really lived.... Occasionally one may make money and perhaps be popular for a time. But in the end it dies."

By 1919 Mathis and her mother had moved to Hollywood. After only a year of screenwriting, she had advanced to the head of Metro's scenario department. She was one of the first heads of any film department and the only female executive at Metro.

During her early years, she had a close association with silent star Alla Nazimova. Their films together can be said to be marked by over-sentimentality; what little praise these films received was due to Nazimova's acting rather the conventional romantic stories.

=== The Four Horsemen of the Apocalypse ===
In 1921, Richard Rowland, the head of Metro, paid $20,000 and 10% of the gross earning for Vicente Blasco Ibáñez's novel The Four Horseman of the Apocalypse. The epic bestseller had been considered unadaptable by every major studio but Rowland handed the book to Mathis for adaptation and was so impressed with her screenplay that he asked her input on director and star. Mathis had seen Rudolph Valentino in a bit part in Eyes of Youth, and she exerted her influence to cast Valentino. Studio heads resisted hiring an unknown actor for a lead role. Despite her many other accomplishments, this "discovery" would grow to be her best-known act. For the same movie she also insisted the studio hire Rex Ingram as director.

The Four Horsemen of the Apocalypse was one of the first films with an anti-war theme. Mathis also injected some early depictions of LGBTQ+ individuals and the breaking of gender norms into the picture. The camera alights ever so briefly on what appears to be a pair of lesbians sitting together at the tango club, and features a scene with German officers coming down the stairs in drag. Of the scene, Mathis later told the Los Angeles Times: "I had the German officers coming down the stairs with women's clothing on. To hundreds of people that meant no more than a masquerade party. To those who have lived and read, and who understand life, that scene stood out as one of the most terrific things in the picture."

==== Valentino ====
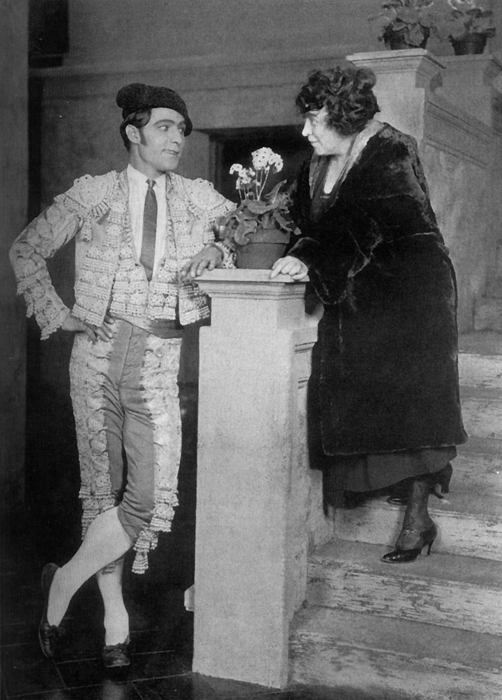
Screenwriter June Mathis on the set of Blood and Sand with star and lifelong friend Rudolph Valentino

The Four Horsemen of the Apocalypse was a success, grossing $4,500,000 domestically, thus becoming one of the most commercially successful silent films ever made and launching Valentino into stardom. Even before it was released, Valentino was receiving offers from other studios. Taking Mathis' advice, he remained with Metro to get another solid role or two under his belt.

Mathis and Valentino remained friends after Four Horsemen. The older plain-looking Mathis doted on the talented, beautiful young man. Accounts state that Valentino regarded Mathis in a motherly way, calling her "Little Mother". Nita Naldi, who worked with them on Blood and Sand, said: "She mothered Rudy, and my dear she worshiped him and he worshiped her." "She discovered me, anything I have accomplished I owe to her, to her judgment, to her advice and to her unfailing patience and confidence in me", said Valentino on Mathis in a 1923 interview with Louella Parsons.

Mathis looked after Valentino's welfare during his time at Metro, making sure he gained the best parts and was taken care of. When Valentino showed up on the set for The Conquering Power, another Mathis script with Rex Ingram at the helm, his new-found stardom went to his head, along with resentment at working for the same wage of $350 a week. The friction between him and Ingram, and his need for more money to support mounting debts, led Valentino to sign with Famous Players–Lasky (later known as Paramount Pictures) for $1,000 a week.

Mathis was also one of the people who helped bail Valentino out of jail when he was arrested for bigamy, having married Natacha Rambova without finalizing his divorce to Jean Acker. Though the two were inseparable, their relationship became strained during Valentino's marriage to Rambova. When Mathis submitted a script for The Hooded Falcon, one of Valentino's pet projects, the couple deemed it unacceptable and asked to have it rewritten. Mathis took it as a great insult and broke off all contact with Valentino.

=== Executive ===
Mathis' position with Metro was called by the Los Angeles Times, "The Most Responsible Job ever Held by A Woman". She was arguably one of the most powerful women in Hollywood, even said to be almost as powerful as Mary Pickford. Mathis had influence over casting, choice of director and many other aspects of production. Her strength lay in careful preparation of the shooting script along with the director, cutting out waste in production while at the same time sharpening narrative continuity.

After she had spent seven years at Metro, Famous Players–Lasky was able to lure her away with the promise that she could continue to write for her protégé Valentino. When Valentino moved to Goldwyn Pictures, she did as well, this time gaining sovereign control.

=== Greed ===
Mathis continued to survive in Hollywood despite being involved in two of the greatest financial fiascoes of the 1920s. When Erich von Stroheim presented Goldwyn Pictures with his masterpiece Greed (1924), following Frank Norris's novel McTeague very closely, it was 42 reels and 10 hours long. Stroheim himself realized the original version was far too long, so he reduced it to 24 reels (6 hours), hoping the film could be screened with intermissions in two successive evenings. But Goldwyn executives demanded further cuts. Stroheim allowed his close friend Rex Ingram to reduce it to 18 reels (4½ hours).

However, in the middle of production, Goldwyn had merged with Metro and Louis B. Mayer Pictures to form Metro-Goldwyn-Mayer. MGM took Greed out of Stroheim's hands and gave it to Mathis, with orders to cut it even more, which she assigned to a routine cutter, Joseph W. Farnham. The film was then reduced to 13 reels (2½ hours) long. In the process, many key characters were cut out, resulting in large continuity gaps.

There is speculation on whether Mathis took part in the actual cutting. However, for contractual reasons, her name was listed in the credits as a writer, and it was she who would be blamed for what Stroheim and his fans would call "tampering with his genius". In fact, Mathis had worked with Stroheim before and had been fond of his themes, and thus it is thought unlikely she would butcher his film unnecessarily.

=== Ben-Hur ===
For the original production of Ben Hur (1925), Mathis fought the studio over the casting and production for many months. It was her idea to film the $1 million script in Italy; the film would eventually come in just under $4 million. When she arrived the original director Charles Brabin, in his words, refused to let her "interfere". The production troubles were numerous, and due to political troubles engulfing Italy at the time, resulted in disputes and delayed permissions. When the sea battle was filmed near Livorno, Italy, many extras had apparently lied about being able to swim. The first attempt to film the chariot race was on a set in Rome, but there were problems with shadows and the racetrack surface. One of the chariots' wheels came apart and the stuntman driving it was thrown in the air and killed.

MGM inherited the production when it took over control of Goldwyn studios; with the film over budget and getting out of control, the studio halted production and relocated the shoot from Italy to California, under the supervision of Irving Thalberg. All of Brabin's footage was reviewed and considered unusable, and MGM would fire Mathis, Brabin, and stars George Walsh and Gertrude Olmstead; Replacing them with director Fred Niblo, screenwriters Bess Meredyth and Carey Wilson, and stars Ramon Novarro and May McAvoy.

After her return, First National hired her as editorial director. She also scripted several successful Colleen Moore pictures including Sally, The Desert Flower, and Irene. Mathis remained at First National for two years, but left over limitations and signed with United Artists; with her husband she made one picture for them, The Masked Woman. The Magic Flame (1927) would be her last picture, and one of her best, due in part to Ronald Colman's performance and Henry King's direction.

== Personal life ==
Outside of her writing, she had a love of Parisian fashion. Mathis was one of the first "writer-directors" and laid the groundwork for the later development of screenwriters becoming producers. A spiritualist with mystical bents, her scripts featured many heroes with a Christ-like demeanor. Since she believed in reincarnation, she always wore an opal ring when she wrote, as she was convinced it brought her ideas.

Mathis had been romantically linked to George Walsh and Rex Ingram; however, she returned from Italy engaged to an Italian cinematographer named Silvano Balboni. The couple married on December 20, 1924, at the Mission of St. Cecilia, in Riverside, California.

== Death ==
After Valentino's marriage to Rambova ended in 1925, the two reconciled at the premiere of Son of the Sheik when Valentino spotted Mathis with friends. When Valentino unexpectedly died in August 1926, Mathis offered up what she thought would be a temporary solution; she lent him her spot in the family crypt she had purchased in Hollywood Memorial Cemetery (now called the Hollywood Forever Cemetery). However, when Mathis herself died the following year, the arrangement became permanent.

On July 26, 1927, during the third act of the Broadway show The Squall at the 48th Street Theatre while accompanied by her 81-year-old grandmother Emily Hawkes, Mathis suffered a fatal heart attack. Her last words were reportedly, "Mother, I'm dying!"

Her ashes were returned to California: instead of "evicting" Valentino, Mathis' husband, Sylvano Balboni, moved Valentino to the crypt beside hers, sold the remaining crypt to Valentino's family and returned to Italy. Mathis and Valentino repose side by side to this day.

== Filmography ==
Film credits of June Mathis
Year	Title	Credit	Studio/Distributor	Ref(s)
1916	The Dawn of Love	Scenario	Rolfe Photoplays	
1916	God's Half Acre	Scenario	Rolfe Photoplays	
1916	Her Great Price	Scenario	Rolfe Photoplays	
1916	The Sunbeam	Scenario	Rolfe Photoplays	
1916	The Upstart	Scenario	Rolfe Photoplays	
1916	The Purple Lady	Scenario	Rolfe Photoplays	
1917	The Call of Her People	Scenario	Columbia Pictures	
1917	Threads of Fate	Scenario	Columbia Pictures	
1917	A Wife by Proxy	Scenario	Columbia Pictures	
1917	Draft 258	Scenario	MGM	
1917	Somewhere in America	Scenario	Rolfe Photoplays	
1917	His Father's Son	Scenario	Rolfe Photoplays	
1917	The Jury of Fate	Adaptation	MGM	
1917	The Barricade	Scenario	Rolfe Photoplays	
1917	The Power of Decision	Scenario	Rolfe Photoplays	
1917	Red, White and Blue Blood	Scenario	MGM	
1917	A Magdalene of the Hills	Scenario	Rolfe Photoplays	
1917	The Millionaire's Double	Story	Rolfe Photoplays	
1917	Miss Robinson Crusoe	Story	Rolfe Photoplays	
1917	The Voice of Conscience	Scenario	MGM	
1917	The Trail of the Shadow	Scenario	Rolfe Photoplays	
1917	The Beautiful Lie	Scenario	Rolfe Photoplays	
1917	Lady Barnacle	Scenario	MGM	
1917	Blue Jeans	Adaptation	MGM	
1917	Aladdin's Other Lamp	Scenario	Rolfe Photoplays	
1918	Toys of Fate	Scenario	Screen Classics Inc.	
1918	The House of Gold	Scenario	MGM	
1918	His Bonded Wife	Scenario	MGM	
1918	The Legion of Death	Screenplay and story	MGM	
1918	The Silent Woman	Scenario	MGM	
1918	Social Quicksands	Scenario	MGM	
1918	A Successful Adventure	Story	MGM	
1918	Sylvia on a Spree	Scenario	MGM	
1918	To Hell with the Kaiser!	Scenario	Screen Classics, Inc.	
1918	The Winding Trail	Story	MGM	
1918	The Winning of Beatrice	Scenario	MGM	
1918	The Brass Check	Scenario	MGM	
1918	The Claim	Scenario	MGM	
1918	Daybreak	Adaptation	MGM	
1918	Eye for Eye	Adaptation	Nazimova Productions, Inc.	
1918	The Eyes of Mystery	Adaptation	MGM	
1918	Five Thousand an Hour	Scenario	MGM	
1918	The House of Myrth	Scenario	MGM	
1918	Gay and Festive Claverhouse	Adaptation	MGM	
1918	Kildare of Storm	Scenario	MGM	
1918	A Man's World	Scenario	MGM	
1918	Secret Strings	Scenario	MGM	
1918	Social Hypocrites	Scenario	MGM	
1918	The Trail to Yesterday	Scenario	MGM	
1918	With Neatness and Dispatch	Scenario	MGM	
1919	Almost Married	Scenario	MGM	
1919	Johnny-on-the-Spot	Scenario	MGM	
1919	The Great Victory	Scenario	Screen Classics Inc.	
1919	The Parisian Tigress	Story	MGM	
1919	Some Bride	Scenario	MGM	
1919	The Amateur Adventuress	Scenario	MGM	
1919	The Brat	Scenario	Nazimova Productions, Inc.	
1919	Blind Man's Eyes	Scenario	MGM	
1919	The Divorcee	Scenario	MGM	
1919	The Island of Intrigue	Scenario	MGM	
1919	Out of the Fog	Scenario	MGM	
1919	Fair and Warmer	Scenario	Screen Classics Inc.	
1919	Lombardi, Ltd.	Scenario	Screen Classics Inc.	
1919	The Man Who Stayed at Home	Scenario	Screen Classics Inc.	
1919	The Microbe	Scenario	MGM	
1919	The Red Lantern	Scenario	Nazimova Productions, Inc.	
1919	Satan Junior	Adaptation	MGM	
1919	The Way of the Strong	Scenario	MGM	
1920	Hearts Are Trumps	Scenario	MGM	
1920	Old Lady 31	Scenario	Screen Classics Inc.	
1920	The Right of Way	Scenario	Screen Classics Inc.	
1920	The Price of Redemption	Scenario	MGM	
1920	Polly With a Past	Scenario	MGM	
1920	The Walk-Offs	Scenario	Screen Classics Inc.	
1920	The Willow Tree	Scenario	Screen Classics Inc.	
1920	Parlor, Bedroom and Bath	Scenario	MGM	
1920	The Saphead	Scenario	MGM	
1921	Camille	Scenario	Nazimova Productions, Inc.	
1921	The Conquering Power	Adaptation	MGM	
1921	The Four Horsemen of the Apocalypse	Screenwriter	MGM	
1921	The Hole in the Wall	Adaptation	MGM	
1921	The Idle Rich	Adaptation	MGM	
1921	The Man Who	Scenario	MGM	
1921	A Trip to Paradise	Scenario	MGM	
1922	Blood and Sand	Screenwriter	Famous Players–Lasky	
1922	The Golden Gift	Story	MGM	
1922	Hate	Adaptation	MGM	
1922	Kisses	Scenario	MGM	
1922	Turn to the Right	Scenario	MGM	
1922	The Young Rajah	Scenario	MGM	
1923	The Day of Faith	Adaptation	Goldwyn Pictures	
1923	In the Palace of the King	Adaptation	Goldwyn Pictures	
1923	The Spanish Dancer	Adaptation	Paramount Pictures	
1923	Three Wise Fools	Screenwriter	Goldwyn Pictures	
1924	Name the Man	Editorial direction	Goldwyn Pictures	
1924	Three Weeks	Editorial direction	Goldwyn Pictures	
1924	Wild Oranges	Editorial direction	Goldwyn Pictures	
1925	Greed	Adaptation and dialogue	MGM; Note: Premiered December 4, 1924, but not released until January 26, 1925	
1925	Ben-Hur	Adaptation	MGM	
1925	Classified	Scenario	Corinne Griffith Productions	
1925	The Desert Flower	Scenario	First National Pictures	
1925	The Marriage Whirl	Editorial direction	Corinne Griffith Productions	
1925	Sally	Scenario	First National Pictures	
1925	We Moderns	Writer	First National Pictures	
1925	What Fools Men	Editorial direction	First National Pictures	
1926	Irene	Editorial direction, continuity	First National Pictures	
1926	The Far Cry	Editorial direction	First National Pictures	
1926	The Girl from Montmartre	Editorial direction	First National Pictures	
1926	The Greater Glory	Scenario	First National Pictures	
1926	Her Second Chance	Editorial director	First National Pictures	
1926	An Affair of the Follies	Scenario	Al Rockett Productions	
1927	The Magic Flame	Continuity	Goldwyn Pictures	
1927	The Masked Woman	Scenario	First National Pictures	

== Bibliography ==
- Barton, Ruth (2014). Rex Ingram: Visionary Director of the Silent Screen. The University Press of Kentucky. ISBN 978-0-8131-4711-6.
- Leider, Emily Wortis (2004). Dark lover: the life and death of Rudolph Valentino. New York: Faber and Faber Inc. ISBN 0-571-21114-3.
- Rambova, Natacha Rudolph Valentino: A Wife's Memories of an Icon. 1921 PVG Publishing. 2009. ISBN 978-0-9816440-4-2
- Slater, Thomas (November 3, 2007). "June Mathis: Moving the margins of mainstream". Journal of Humanities. Archived from the original on February 19, 2008.
- Slater, Thomas (1984). "June Mathis": Dictionary of Literary Biography vol 44, American screenwriters: second series. Detroit, Mich: Gale Research Co. p. 246. ISBN 0-8103-1722-2.
- Slater, Thomas (2008). The vision and the struggle: June Mathis's work on Ben-Hur (1922–24). Detroit, Mich: Post Script.
- Shulman, Irving (1967). Valentino. New York: Simon & Schuster.
- Nelmes, Jill; Selbo, Jule (2015). Women Screenwriters: An International Guide. Springer. ISBN 978-1-137-31237-2.
