= Eugene Borden =

French-American actor (1897–1971)

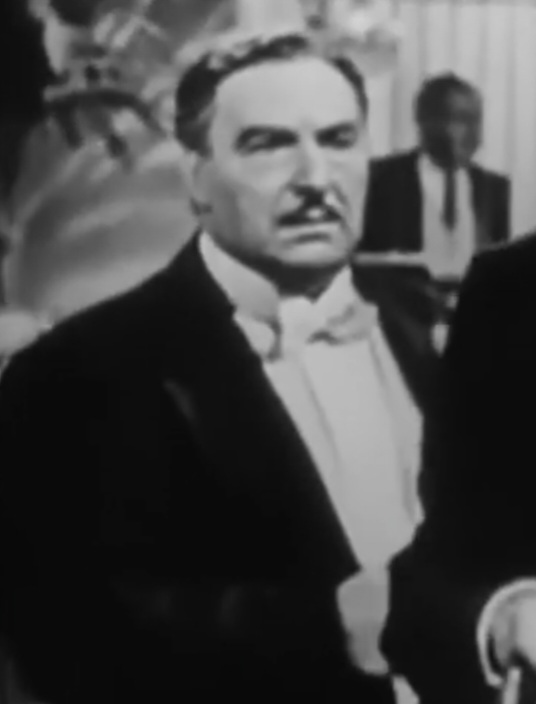
- Borden in the "'Casino Royale" episode of Climax! (1954).
- Born: Élysée Eugène Prieur-Bardin; March 21, 1897; Constantinople, Ottoman Empire (now Istanbul, Turkey)
- Died: July 21, 1971 (aged 74); Los Angeles, California, U.S.
- Resting place: Woodlawn Memorial Cemetery
- Occupation: Actor
- Years active: 1917–1966
- Spouse: Gilberte Sauvage (m. 1918; death 1919) Sibyl Sanderson Fagan (m. 1920; div. 1922) Anna Pavel Powell (m. 1924) Elva Smith Stokes (m. 1939)

Eugene Borden (born Élysée Eugène Prieur-Bardin, March 21, 1897 – July 2, 1971) was a French-American actor, active in Hollywood from the silent era until the mid-1960s. He appeared in over 150 films, as well as shorts, serials, and television shows.

== Early life and education ==
Borden was born to French parents in Constantinople in 1897. He was one of three children born to painter Eugène-Antoine Prieur-Bardin and his wife Augustine Luce Vercelli. The family returned to France in 1901, and settled in Marseille. He also spent some time in Algiers, where his mother moved after his father's death in 1905.

Borden immigrated to the United States in 1914 at the age of 17 to pursue an acting career on Broadway.

== Career ==
By 1917, the same year he obtained his American citizenship, Borden had entered the film industry, appearing in a featured role in Christy Cabanne's The Slacker. Over the next 43 years, Borden appeared in 160 feature films, usually in uncredited roles, many of which were as characters do menial labor, such as headwaiters, porters, pursers and coachmen.

During his long career in films, Borden appeared in many notable movies. During the silent era, he appeared in such notable productions as: George D. Baker's Revelation (1918); Blue Blood (1925), directed by Scott R. Dunlap; and the original film version of Gentlemen Prefer Blondes (1928), directed by Malcolm St. Clair. During this time, Borden also appeared in two successful Broadway plays: The Better 'Ole, a musical comedy which ran for over 350 performances in 1918–19; and 1922's musical comedy, The French Maid, with music by George Gershwin and Gus Edwards.

Borden smoothly made the transition to sound films, appearing in numerous notable films, in some of which he had significant roles. Notable films of the 1930s in which he appeared include: 1934's Marie Galante, directed by Henry King and starring Spencer Tracy; the 1936 comedy Wife vs. Secretary, starring Clark Gable, Jean Harlow and Myrna Loy, and featuring Jimmy Stewart in one of his first film appearances; Café Metropole, a 1937 romantic comedy starring Tyrone Power, Loretta Young, and Adolphe Menjou; the 1938 Sonja Henie vehicle, Happy Landing, which also stars Don Ameche; and the 1939 version of The Three Musketeers, starring Don Ameche and the Ritz Brothers. Borden continued his prolific ways in the 1940s, appearing in dozens of films, some of which included: the classic The Mark of Zorro (1940), starring Tyrone Power, Linda Darnell, and Basil Rathbone, in which Borden had a featured role; the 1942 screwball comedy The Lady is Willing, starring Fred MacMurray and Marlene Dietrich; The Song of Bernadette (1945), starring Jennifer Jones and an all-star cast; as the Quartermaster in the Bogart and Bacall classic To Have and Have Not; in the classic The Razor's Edge (1946), starring Tyrone Power and Gene Tierney; Rita Hayworth's tour de force, Gilda in 1946; as Michel, the owner of the French restaurant, in The Bishop's Wife, starring Cary Grant, Loretta Young, and David Niven; and the 1949 classic musical On the Town, starring Gene Kelly (who also directed), Frank Sinatra, Betty Garrett, and Ann Miller.

Borden also did some French-language dubbing of American films. Notably, he was the voice of Prof on the original 1938 dub of Disney's Snow White and the Seven Dwarfs.

Borden remained active in films throughout the 1950s, as well as transitioning into the new medium of television. One of this most notable roles would occur in 1951's classic musical, An American in Paris, starring Gene Kelly, Leslie Caron, and Oscar Levant, when he had the featured role as Kelly and Levant's landlord, Georges Mattieu. Other notable films in which he appeared during this decade include: All About Eve (1950), starring Bette Davis and Anne Baxter; the Bob Hope comedy, My Favorite Spy; Howard Hawks' The Big Sky (1952), starring Kirk Douglas; The Far Country, directed by Anthony Mann in 1955, starring Jimmy Stewart, Ruth Roman, and Walter Brennan; To Catch a Thief (1955), starring Cary Grant and Grace Kelly; another Jimmy Stewart film, The Spirit of St. Louis (1957), directed by Billy Wilder; and the 1958 horror classic, The Fly, starring Al Hedison and Vincent Price. Borden appeared in several films in the 1960s, although most of his work in that decade was on the small screen. His notable films include: 1960's Can-Can, starring Frank Sinatra, Shirley MacLaine, Maurice Chevalier, and Louis Jourdan; Take Her, She's Mine (1963), starring Jimmy Stewart and Sandra Dee; and the Jerry Lewis and Tony Curtis comedy, Boeing, Boeing (1965). His final big screen appearance would be in the 1966 spy spoof, Our Man Flint, starring James Coburn.

In addition to his film work, Borden appeared in numerous television shows during the 1950s and 1960s. Some of the shows on which he performed included My Little Margie, Climax!, The Millionaire, The George Burns and Gracie Allen Show, Have Gun - Will Travel, Perry Mason, the original Twilight Zone, Combat!, The Farmer's Daughter, Don't Call Me Charlie!, and Rawhide. Borden's last performance was in 1966 on the television series Run for Your Life.

== Death ==
After his retirement, Borden lived at the Motion Picture Home, in Woodland Hills, California. He died there on July 21, 1971, at the age of 74, and is buried in Woodlawn Memorial Cemetery in Santa Monica.

== Filmography ==
(Per AFI database and imdb.com)

- The Slacker (1917)
- Draft 258 (1917)
- Think It over (1917)
- The Liar (1918)
- Cyclone Higgins, D.D. (1918)
- Revelation (1918)
- The Stealers (1920)
- The Barricade (1921)
- The Porcelain Lamp (1921)
- Blue Blood (1925)
- The Jade Cup (1926)
- Gentlemen Prefer Blondes (1928)
- Hold Your Man (1929)
- Le spectre vert (1930)
- The Woman Racket (1930)
- Chasing Rainbows (1930)
- La veuve joyeuse (1934)
- Bolero (1934)
- Coming Out Party (1934)
- Hell in the Heavens (1934)
- Marie Galante (1934)
- Sadie McKee (1934)
- The Cat and the Fiddle (1934)
- I'll Tell the World (1934)
- L'homme des Folies Bergère (1935)
- Goin' to Town (1935)
- Under Two Flags (1936)
- Wife vs. Secretary (1936) – Ship's Officer (uncredited)
- Fatal Lady (1936)
- Till We Meet Again (1936)
- The Road to Glory (1936)
- Everybody's Old Man (1936)
- Souls at Sea (1937)
- Charlie Chan on Broadway (1937)
- Thin Ice (1937)
- Café Metropole (1937)
- They Gave Him a Gun (1937)
- Big Town Girl (1937)
- I Met Him in Paris (1937)
- The Firefly (1937)
- Espionage (1937)
- Seventh Heaven (1937)
- The Lady Escapes (1937)
- Jewels of Brandenburg (1937)
- Charlie Chan at Monte Carlo (1938)
- Happy Landing (1938)
- Battle of Broadway (1938)
- Always Goodbye (1938)
- Artists and Models Abroad (1938)
- A Trip to Paris (1938)
- The Lone Wolf in Paris (1938)
- I'll Give a Million (1938)
- Mysterious Mr. Moto (1938)
- Sharpshooters (1938)
- Pack Up Your Troubles (1939)
- Chasing Danger (1939)
- News Is Made at Night (1939)
- Everything Happens at Night (1939)
- The Three Musketeers (1939)
- The Mark of Zorro (1940)
- The Man I Married (1940)
- Down Argentine Way (1940)
- I Was an Adventuress (1940)
- Earthbound (1940)
- Charlie Chan in Rio (1941)
- I Was a Prisoner on Devil's Island (1941)
- Scotland Yard (1941)
- That Night in Rio (1941)
- Week-End in Havana (1941)
- Dr. Renault's Secret (1942)
- Footlight Serenade (1942)
- Casablanca (1942) as Policeman (uncredited)
- Kid Glove Killer (1942)
- The Lady is Willing (1942)
- Paris Calling (1942)
- Sleepytime Gal (1942)
- Gildersleeve on Broadway (1943)
- Mission to Moscow (1943)
- Paris After Dark (1943)
- Wintertime (1943)
- Adventure in Iraq (1943)
- The Song of Bernadette (1943)
- The Desert Song (1944)
- Dark Waters (1944)
- Mrs. Parkington (1944)
- Our Hearts Were Young and Gay (1944)
- Strange Affair (1944)
- Till We Meet Again (1944)
- To Have and Have Not (1944) as Quartermaster (uncredited)
- The Caribbean Mystery (1945)
- Dakota (1945)
- The Dolly Sisters (1945)
- A Song to Remember (1945)
- Thrill of a Romance (1945)
- Yolanda and the Thief (1945)
- Boston Blackie and the Law (1946)
- The Catman of Paris (1946)
- Cloak and Dagger (1946)
- Do You Love Me (1946)
- Gilda (1946)
- Never Say Goodbye (1946)
- The Razor's Edge (1946)
- The Return of Monte Cristo (1946)
- The Searching Wind (1946)
- So Dark the Night (1946)
- The Thrill of Brazil (1946)
- The Jolson Story (1947)
- Cigarette Girl (1947)
- The Foxes of Harrow (1947) as French Auctioneer (uncredited)
- Framed (1947)
- Jewels of Brandenburg (1947)
- Killer McCoy (1947)
- The Lost Moment (1947)
- The Perils of Pauline (1947)
- The Bishop's Wife (1948)
- Glamour Girl (1948)
- Rogues' Regiment (1948)
- Saigon (1948)
- Mighty Joe Young (1949)
- On the Town (1949)
- All About Eve (1950) – Frenchman
- Black Hand (1950)
- Last of the Buccaneers (1950)
- The Petty Girl (1950)
- Under My Skin (1950)
- An American in Paris (1951) as Georges Mattieu
- Flame of Stamboul (1951)
- The Law and the Lady (1951)
- The Light Touch (1951)
- My Favorite Spy (1951)
- On the Riviera (1951)
- Silver Canyon (1951)
- Up Front (1951)
- Bal Tabarin (1952)
- The Happy Time (1952)
- Thunderbirds (1952)
- The Big Sky (1952)
- The Iron Mistress (1952)
- Red Ball Express (1952)
- April in Paris (1953)
- A Blueprint for Murder (1953)
- Dangerous When Wet (1953)
- Ma and Pa Kettle on Vacation (1953)
- Saginaw Trail (1953)
- Titanic (1953)
- Paris Model (1953)
- Hell and High Water (1954)
- Jubilee Trail (1954)
- Phffft (1954)
- So This Is Paris (1955)
- The Far Country (1955)
- Interrupted Melody (1955)
- The Purple Mask (1955)
- Three for the Show (1955)
- To Catch a Thief (1955) as French Waiter (uncredited)
- It's Always Fair Weather (1955) as Italian Chef (uncredited)
- Pirates of Tripoli (1955)
- The Best Things in Life Are Free (1956)
- Silk Stockings (1957)
- The Spirit of St. Louis (1957)
- The Tarnished Angels (1958)
- The Fly (1958)
- Me and the Colonel (1958)
- The Perfect Furlough (1959)
- Can-Can (1960)
- Seven Thieves (1960)
- All in a Night's Work (1961)
- Back Street (1961)
- Take Her, She's Mine (1963)
- What a Way to Go! (1964)
- Boeing Boeing (1965)
- Our Man Flint (1966)
