= His Last Haul =

1928 film

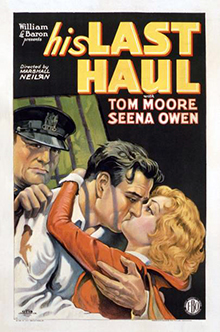
- Film poster
- Directed by: Marshall Neilan
- Written by: Randolph Bartlett; Scott Darling; Louis Sarecky
- Starring: Tom Moore; Seena Owen; Alan Roscoe
- Cinematography: Philip Tannura
- Edited by: Mildred Richter
- Production company: Film Booking Offices of America
- Distributed by: Film Booking Offices of America
- Release date: November 11, 1928
- Running time: 66 minutes
- Country: United States
- Language: Silent (English intertitles)

His Last Haul is a 1928 American silent crime drama film directed by Marshall Neilan and starring Tom Moore, Seena Owen, and Alan Roscoe. Under a woman's guidance, a criminal attempts to reform.

== Cast ==
- Tom Moore as Joe Hammond
- Seena Owen as Blanche
- Charles Mason as Anthony Dugan
- Alan Roscoe as Fly Cop
- Henry Sedley as Blackmailer

== Censorship ==
When His Last Haul was released, many states and cities in the United States had censor boards that could require cuts or other eliminations before the film could be shown. The Kansas censor board ordered the elimination of all "amens" and "hallelujahs" in the intertitles.

== Preservation ==
His Last Haul is a lost film.

== Bibliography ==
- Munden, Kenneth White. The American Film Institute Catalog of Motion Pictures Produced in the United States, Part 1. University of California Press, 1997.
