= The Jury of Fate =

1917 film

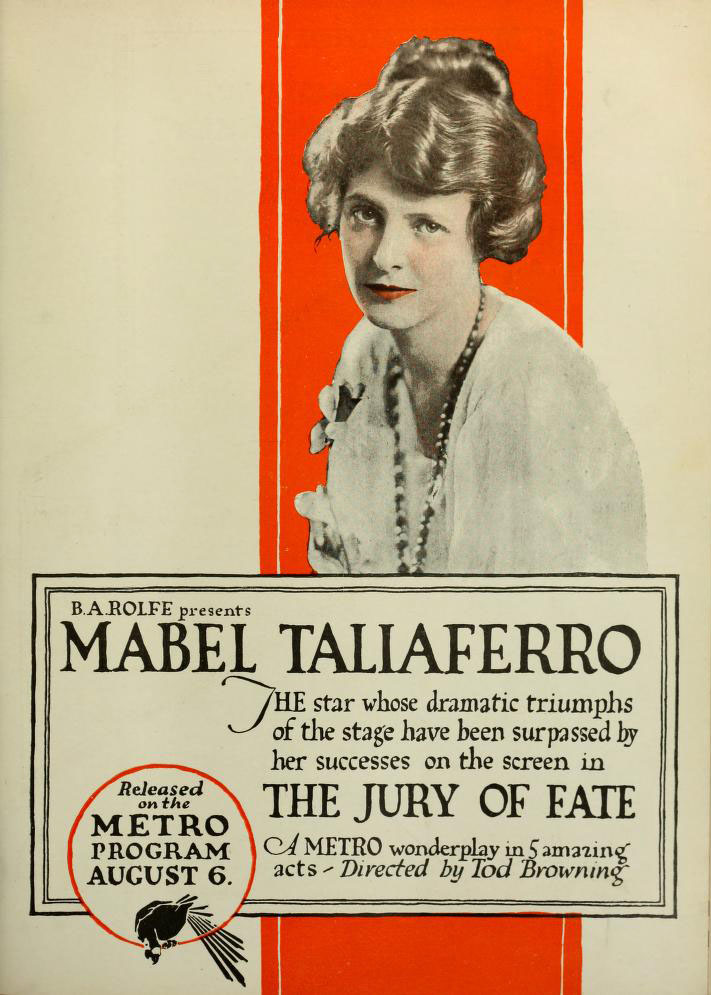
- Film poster
- Directed by: Tod Browning
- Written by: Finis Fox; June Mathis
- Produced by: B. A. Rolfe
- Starring: William Sherwood; Mabel Taliaferro
- Cinematography: Charles W. Hoffman
- Distributed by: Metro Pictures Corporation
- Release date: August 6, 1917
- Running time: 5 reels (approximately 50 minutes)
- Country: United States
- Language: Silent (English intertitles)

The Jury of Fate is a 1917 American silent drama film directed by Tod Browning. Mabel Taliaferro plays a brother and sister dual role in the film, which is set in Canada. With no prints of The Jury of Fate located in any film archives, it is a lost film.

== Plot ==
As described in a film magazine, Henri Labordie is the father of twins. Jeanne is sweet and winsome while her brother Jaques, pampered by her father, is ill-tempered. When Jaques dies through his own caddishness, Jeanne, to spare her father from the shock, clips off her hair and dons boys clothing so that her father will think that it was her and not Jaques who drowned in a stream. When Labordie dies, Jeanne's deception ends when she goes to Montreal to fulfill an ancient pact, and there she finds happiness.

== Cast ==
- William Sherwood as Donald Duncan
- Mabel Taliaferro as Jaques / Jeanne
- Frank Bennett as François Leblanc (credited as Frank Fisher Bennett)
- Charles Fang as Ching
- Albert Tavernier as Henri Labordie
- Bradley Barker as Louis Hebert
- H. F. Webber as Duval Hebert

== Reception ==
Like many American films of the time, The Jury of Fate was subject to cuts by city and state film censorship boards. The Chicago Board of Censors cut the scene showing a woman in travail prior to the birth of a baby, a closeup of a half-breed choking a man over a railing, and shortened a scene with a man on the floor showing blood.
