= Eva Converse =

American actress and model

- Born: Evelyn Converse; Eau Claire, Wisconsin
- Occupations: Actress, Model

Evelyn "Eva" Converse was an American film and stage actress and model.

== Early life ==
Evelyn was born in Eau Claire, Wisconsin, the daughter of Henry E. Converse and Emma Gilbert.

== Career ==
In 1911, Converse was in the moving picture that illustrated the song showing at the Palace Theater "Won't You Share My Bungalow?" In 1917, Converse appeared in the silent film drama, The Slacker, which was produced and distributed by Metro Pictures. The film caused a spike in recruitment for the U.S. Army just after the U.S. entry into World War I.

In 1909, Converse posed for a portrait by the artist Edwin Austin Abbey titled "The Coronation of Edward VII", which now hangs in Buckingham Palace. Converse portrayed Queen Alexandra. Abbey had searched for two years for a model.

== Filmography ==
Year	Title	Role	Notes
1912	Prince Charming	Countess Moneybags	
1917	The Slacker		
