= Little Marie =

1915 film

- Directed by: Tod Browning
- Starring: Walter Long; Seena Owen
- Release date: July 3, 1915
- Running time: 2 reels
- Country: United States
- Language: Silent with English intertitles

Little Marie is a 1915 American short drama film directed by Tod Browning.

== Cast ==
- Walter Long
- Seena Owen as Bianca Pastorelli (as Signe Auen)
- Charles West as Beppo Puccini (as Charles H. West)
- Tom Wilson as Sam Coggini
