= The Dawn of Love (film) =

1916 film by Edwin Carewe

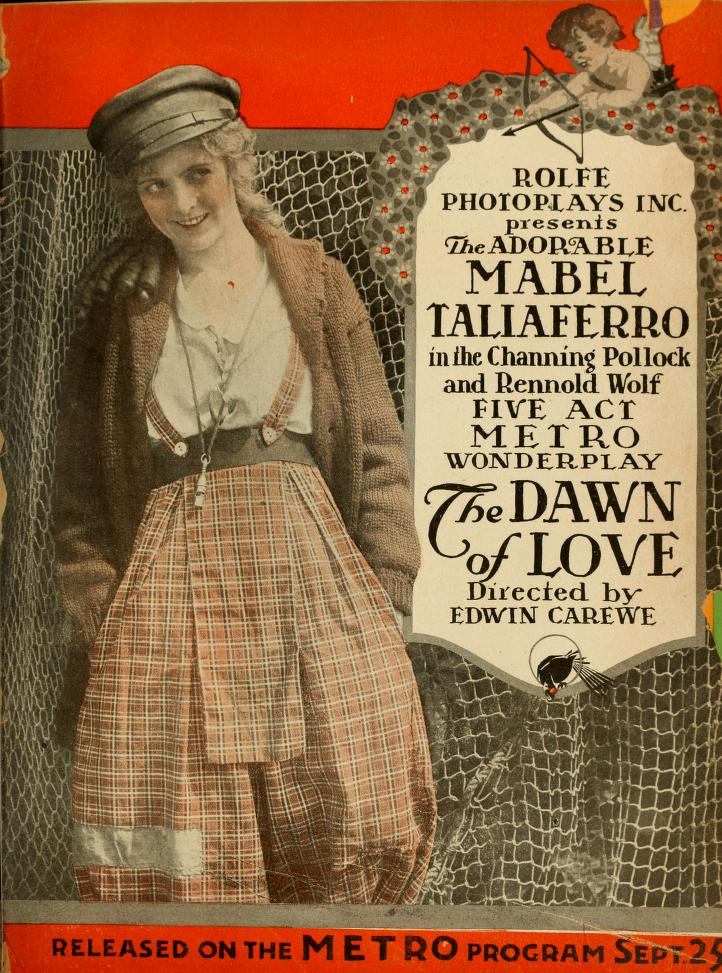
- lobby poster
- Directed by: Edwin Carewe
- Written by: Channing Pollock(story); Rennold Wolf(story); June Mathis(scenario)
- Starring: Mabel Taliaferro
- Cinematography: Arthur A. Caldwell
- Distributed by: Metro Pictures
- Release date: September 25, 1916
- Running time: 50 minutes
- Country: United States
- Language: Silent film..(English intertitles)

The Dawn of Love is a 1916 silent film drama directed by Edwin Carewe and starring Mabel Taliaferro. It was produced by B. A. Rolfe and distributed through Metro Pictures.

== Cast ==
- Mabel Taliaferro - Jacqueline Allen
- Robert Frazer - John Lang (*as Robert W. Frazer)
- Leslie Stowe - Miles Allen (*as Leslie M. Stowe)
- Peter Lang - Captain Ben Durling
- Martin J. Faust - Ward Jennings
- D. H. Turner - Chief of the Revenue Office
- Frank Bates - His Assistant
- John M. La Mond - Tim(*as Jack La Mond)

== Preservation ==
With no prints of The Dawn of Love located in any film archives, it is considered a lost film.
