= Sooner or Later (1920 film) =

1920 silent film

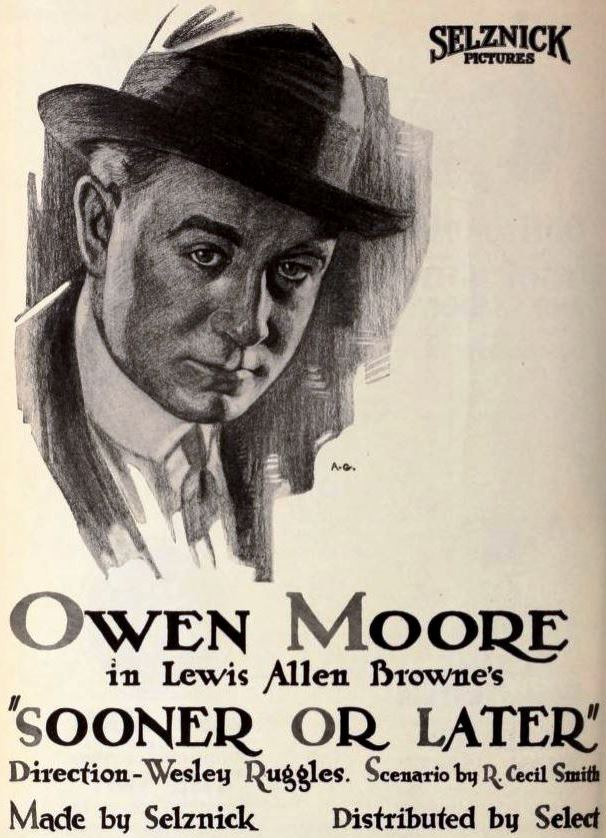
- Directed by: Wesley Ruggles
- Written by: Lewis Allen Browne (story); R. Cecil Smith
- Produced by: Lewis J. Selznick
- Starring: Owen Moore; Seena Owen; Clifford Grey
- Cinematography: George Peters
- Production company: Selznick Pictures
- Distributed by: Select Pictures
- Release date: February 1920
- Running time: 50 minutes
- Country: United States
- Languages: Silent; English intertitles

Sooner or Later is a 1920 American silent comedy film directed by Wesley Ruggles and starring Owen Moore, Seena Owen and Clifford Grey. With no holdings located in archives, it is a lost film.

== Cast ==
- Owen Moore as Patrick Murphy
- Seena Owen as Edna Ellis
- Clifford Grey as Robert Ellis
- Amy Dennis as Mrs. Ellis
- John E. Brennan as Charles Porter
- Marie Burke as Mrs. Hollander
- Katherine Perry as Miss Hollander

== Bibliography ==
- Paul C. Spehr & Gunnar Lundquist. American Film Personnel and Company Credits, 1908-1920. McFarland, 1996.
