= The Rush Hour =

1928 film

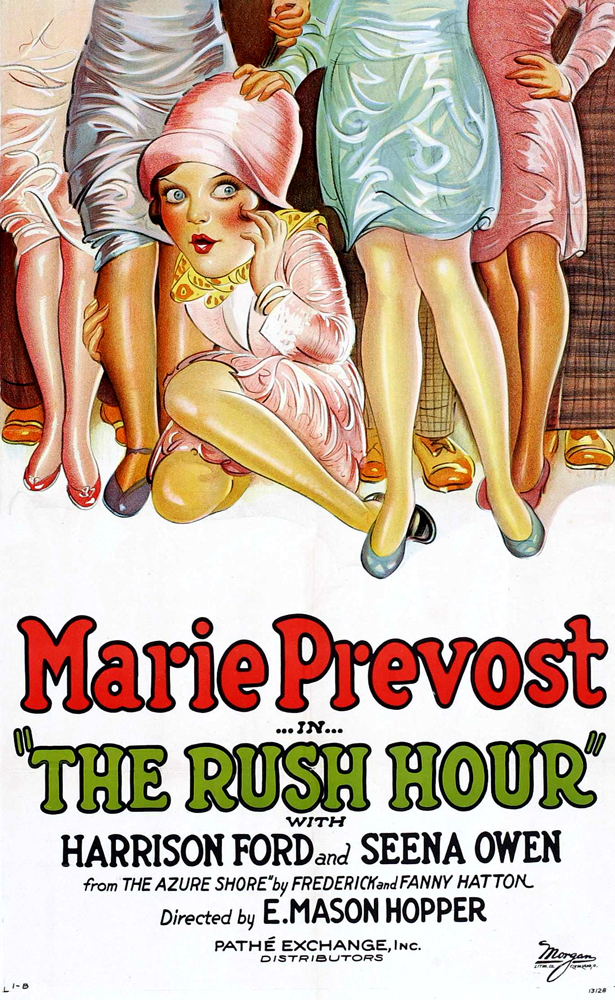
- Directed by: E. Mason Hopper
- Written by: Fanny Hatton (story); Frederic Hatton (story); Leslie Mason; Zelda Sears; Fred Stanley
- Starring: Marie Prevost; Harrison Ford; Seena Owen
- Cinematography: Dewey Wrigley
- Edited by: W. Donn Hayes
- Production company: DeMille Pictures Corporation
- Distributed by: Pathé Exchange
- Release date: December 12, 1928
- Running time: 60 minutes
- Country: United States
- Languages: Silent; English intertitles

The Rush Hour is a 1928 American silent comedy film directed by E. Mason Hopper and starring Marie Prevost, Harrison Ford and Seena Owen.

== Cast ==
- Marie Prevost as Margie Dolan
- Harrison Ford as Dan Morley
- Seena Owen as Yvonne Dorée
- David Butler as William Finch
- Ward Crane as Dunrock
- Arthur Hoyt as Professor Jones
- Wilson Benge as Travel Agent
- Mathilde Comont as Chanteuse at Bohemia Cafe
- William Irving as Seasick Shipboard Passenger
- Franklin Pangborn as Troublemaker at Bohemia Cafe

== Preservation status ==
- The film has been preserved at the UCLA Film & Television Archive.

== Bibliography ==
- Richard Lewis Ward. When the Cock Crows: A History of the Pathé Exchange. SIU Press, 2016.
