= The Lost House =

1915 film

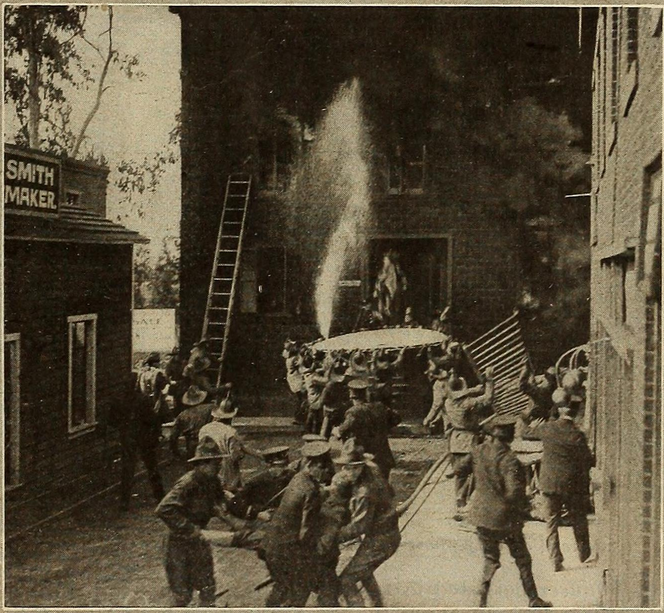
- Still in Reel Life captioned "Ford and Dosia Leaped into the Waiting Life-net"
- Directed by: Christy Cabanne
- Written by: Richard Harding Davis; Anita Loos
- Starring: Lillian Gish
- Cinematography: William Fildew
- Production company: Majestic Motion Picture Company
- Distributed by: Mutual Film
- Release date: March 25, 1915
- Running time: 40 minutes
- Country: United States
- Language: Silent with English intertitles

The Lost House is a lost 1915 American short drama film directed by Christy Cabanne and starring Lillian Gish.

== Plot ==
According to a film magazine, "Dosia Dale, a young Kentucky heiress and her uncle's ward, arrives in a hotel heavily veiled, and apparently ill. She is under subjection to her uncle who calls in Dr. Protheroe, crook and charlatan. The uncle has spent Dosia's fortune. As the time for turning it over approaches he proposes marriage to save himself. She refuses indignantly. Balked, he schemes with Protheroe to do away with her. Protheroe's house is in a street devoted to insane asylums. There Dosia is locked in an upper room. She manages to slip a note through the window bars, but as that is a trick of the insane the police pay no attention. Ford, a reporter, sees the note, learns Dosia Dale, an heiress, soon to come of age, has been traveling with her uncle, and investigates.

The finder of the note cannot locate the house it came from. Inquiries develop denials only. Finally, hiring a street piano, Ford plays "My Old Kentucky Home" in the street till a glove drops from a window of the third house from the corner."I'm a naval officer suffering from a nervous breakdown." he later explains to Protheroe and is given a room. He discovers the girl, but is attacked by Protheroe and Dosia's uncle. He barricades himself in. knowing his pal. Cuthbert will bring the police at twelve if the two are not safely out. The police come, and Protheroe and the uncle open fire. Rifles and machine guns begin popping. As Ford and Dosia plight their troth, the house catches fire and they escape over the roof, leaping through the flames into the fire net below. Behind them Protheroe and Dosia's uncle both are shot to death."

== Cast ==
- Lillian Gish as Dosia Dale
- Wallace Reid as Ford
- F. A. Turner as Dosia's uncle
- Elmer Clifton as Cuthbert
- Allan Sears as Dr. Protheroe (as A.D. Sears)

== Preservation ==
With no holdings located in archives, The Lost House is considered a lost film.

== See also ==
- Lillian Gish filmography
- Wallace Reid Filmography
