= Mabel Taliaferro =

American actress (1887–1979)

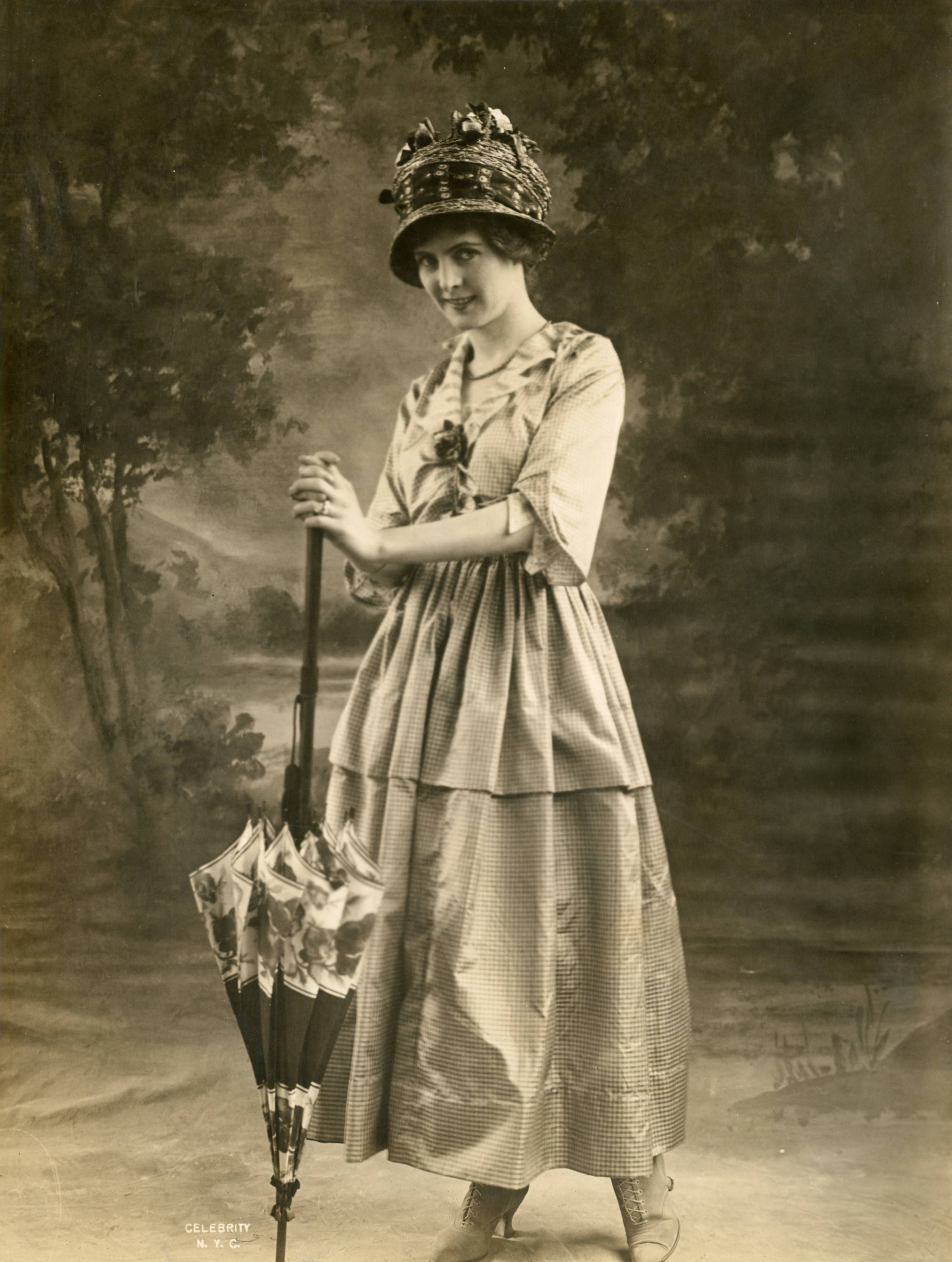
- Taliaferro in 1919
- Born: Maybelle Evelyn Taliaferro; May 21, 1887; Manhattan, New York City, U.S.
- Died: January 24, 1979 (aged 91); Honolulu, Hawaii, U.S.
- Other name: Nell Taliaferro
- Occupation: Actress
- Years active: 1899–1956
- Spouses: Frederic W. Thompson (m. 1906; div. 1911) Thomas Carrigan (m. 1913; div. 1919) Joseph O'Brien (m. 1920; div. 1929) Robert Ober (died 1950)
- Children: 1
- Parent: Anna Taliaferro
- Relatives: Edith Taliaferro (sister); Bessie Barriscale (cousin)

Mabel Taliaferro (born Maybelle Evelyn Taliaferro; May 21, 1887 – January 24, 1979) was an American stage and silent-screen actress, known as "the Sweetheart of American Movies."

== Early years ==
Taliaferro was born as Maybelle Evelyn Taliaferro in Manhattan, New York City and raised in Richmond, Virginia. She was descended on her father's side from one of the early families who settled in Virginia in the 17th century, the Taliaferros, whose roots are from a northern Italian immigrant to England in the 16th century.

Taliaferro was a sister of film and stage actress Edith Taliaferro and the cousin of actress Bessie Barriscale.

== Career ==
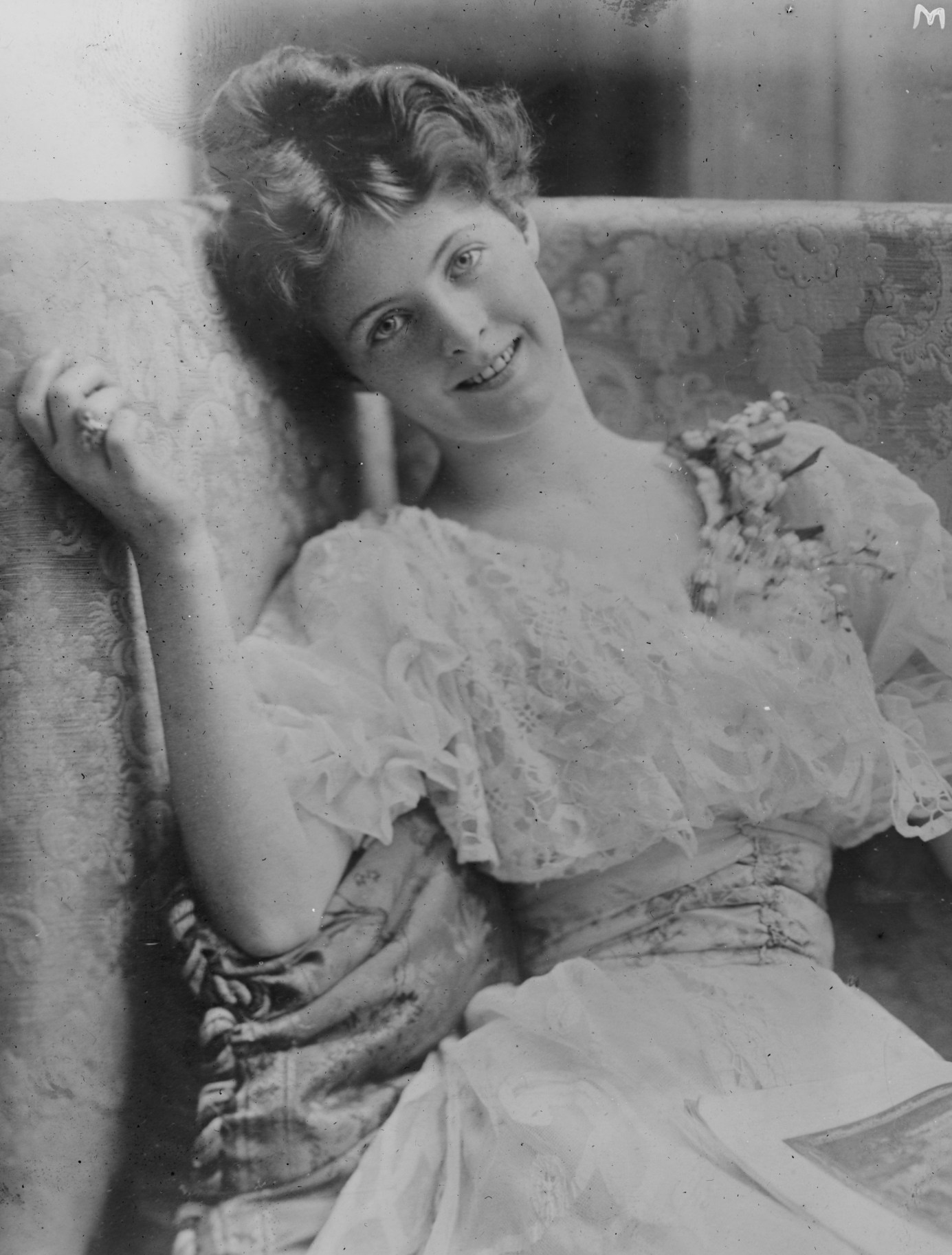
Taliaferro in 1913

Taliaferro began acting on stage at age 2 with Chauncey Olcott. Later she appeared with James A. Hearne and with Sol Smith Russell in A Poor Relation. In 1899, she achieved distinction in the role of little Esther in Israel Zangwill's play, Children of the Ghetto. A year later she played the witching elf-child in Yeats's Gaelic fantasy, The Land of Heart's Desire. In 1902-3 Taliaferro appeared in An American Invasion with John E. Dodson and Miss Annie Irish. The following year she was seen in the support of Louis Mann in The Consul. Her greatest opportunity came when she was cast for Lovey Mary in Mrs. Wiggs of the Cabbage Patch, a part she played continuously for two and one-half years. In 1905 she supported Arnold Daly in You Never Can Tell and later went on tour in The Bishop's Carriage. After a brief season in vaudeville she joined William Collier's company in a tour of Australia.

In the first decade of the 20th century, Taliaferro's husband and manager, Frederic Thompson, announced that her first name would be changed to Nell for billing purposes. Her first production with her new name was Springtime, and the change brought an outcry of opposition from the public. By 1910, she was once again Mabel.

In 1911, her movie career began with the Selig Studios in The Three of Us and the film version of Cinderella co-starring her then-husband Thomas Carrigan. She continued performing in films through her retirement in 1921. In 1940, she appeared in her final picture, My Love Came Back. Her final Broadway success was in ''Bloomer Girl'' (1944).

On November 20, 1950, Taliaferro co-starred with Glenn Langan in "The Floor of Heaven" on Studio One on TV.

== Suffrage activism ==
Mabel Taliaferro was known as favoring women's suffrage. In February 1914 she participated in a suffrage gathering that drew 1,500 people to honor the work of Anna Howard Shaw.

== Personal life and death ==
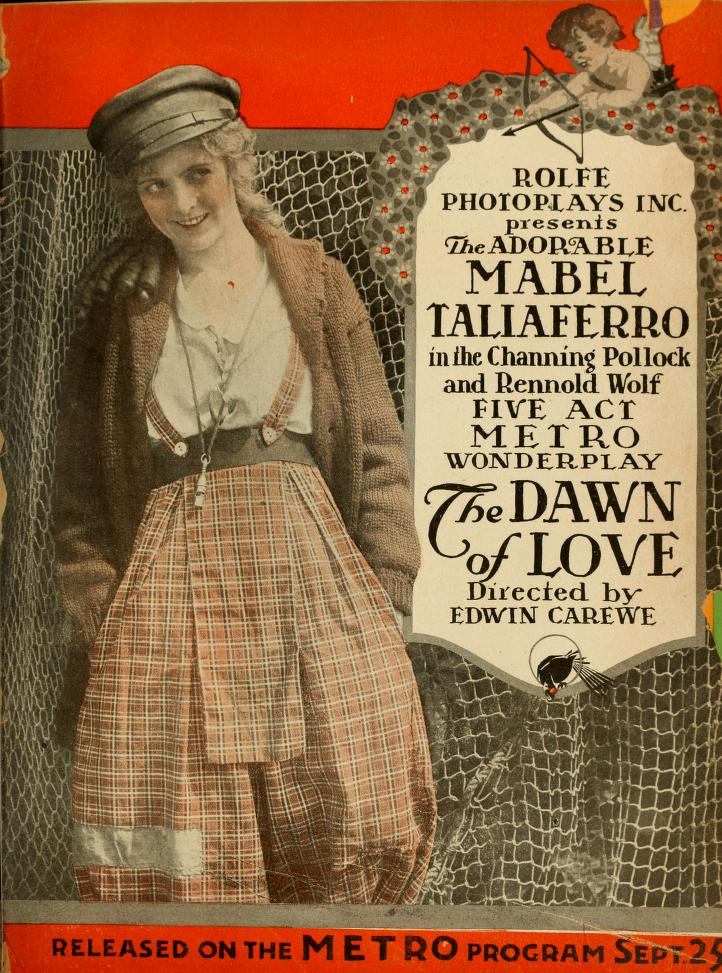
The Dawn of Love (1916)

In 1906, Taliaferro married (as her first husband) Frederic Thompson, who created Luna Park in Coney Island as well as the New York Hippodrome, under whose management she starred in the Broadway play Polly of the Circus.

On January 11, 1920, Taliaferro married army officer Joseph Patrick O'Brien in Darien, Connecticut. They were divorced in Reno, Nevada on June 3, 1929. She also married and divorced actor Thomas Jay Carrigan. Taliaferro married Robert Ober. He died in 1950. She had one child.

In 1907, she was injured in a car crash. She died in Honolulu, Hawaii, on January 24, 1979, aged 91.

== Filmography ==
- My Love Came Back (1940)
- Alexander Hamilton (1924)
- The Rich Slave (1921)
- Sentimental Tommy (1921)
- The Mite of Love (1919)
- Draft 258 (1917)
- Peggy Leads the Way (1917, extant)
- The Jury of Fate (1917)
- Peggy, the Will O' the Wisp (1917)
- A Magdalene of the Hills (1917)
- The Barricade (1917)
- A Wife by Proxy (1917, extant)
- The Sunbeam (1916)
- The Dawn of Love (1916)
- God's Half Acre (1916), extant)
- The Snowbird (1916), extant)
- Her Great Price (1916)
- The Three of Us (1914)
- The Sunbeam (1912)
- Cinderella (1911; released January 1, 1912)

== Stage ==
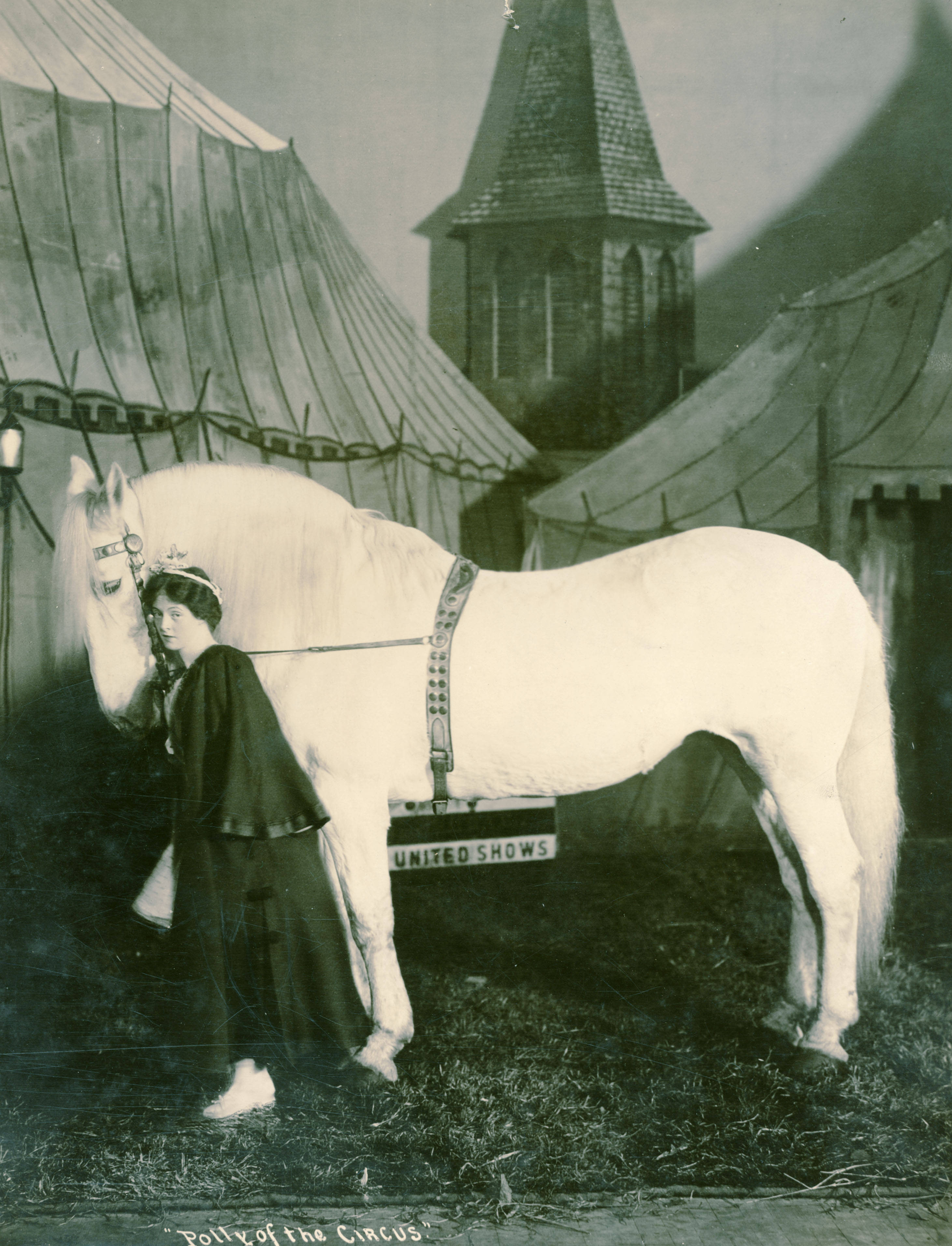
Mabel Taliaferro in the play Polly of the Circus

- Springtime Folly (1951)
- Bloomer Girl (1946)
- Victory Belles (1944)
- George Washington Slept Here (1941)
- The Prince's Secret (1935)
- Back Fire (1932)
- The Piper (1920)
- Luck in Pawn (1919)
- Young Wisdom (1914)
- The Call of the Cricket (1910)
- Springtime (1909)
- Polly of the Circus (1907)
- Pippa Passes (1906)
- You Never Can Tell (1905)
- Mrs. Wiggs of the Cabbage Patch (1905)
- The Land of Heart's Desire (1903)
- The Consul (1903)
- The Little Princess (1903)
- An American Invasion (1902)
- The Price of Peace (1901)
- Lost River (1900)
- Children of the Ghetto (1899)

== TV ==
- The De Santre Story (1956)
- The Hat from Hangtown (1952)
- Mistress Sims Inherits (1949)
- You Can't Take It with You (1945)
