= The Slacker =

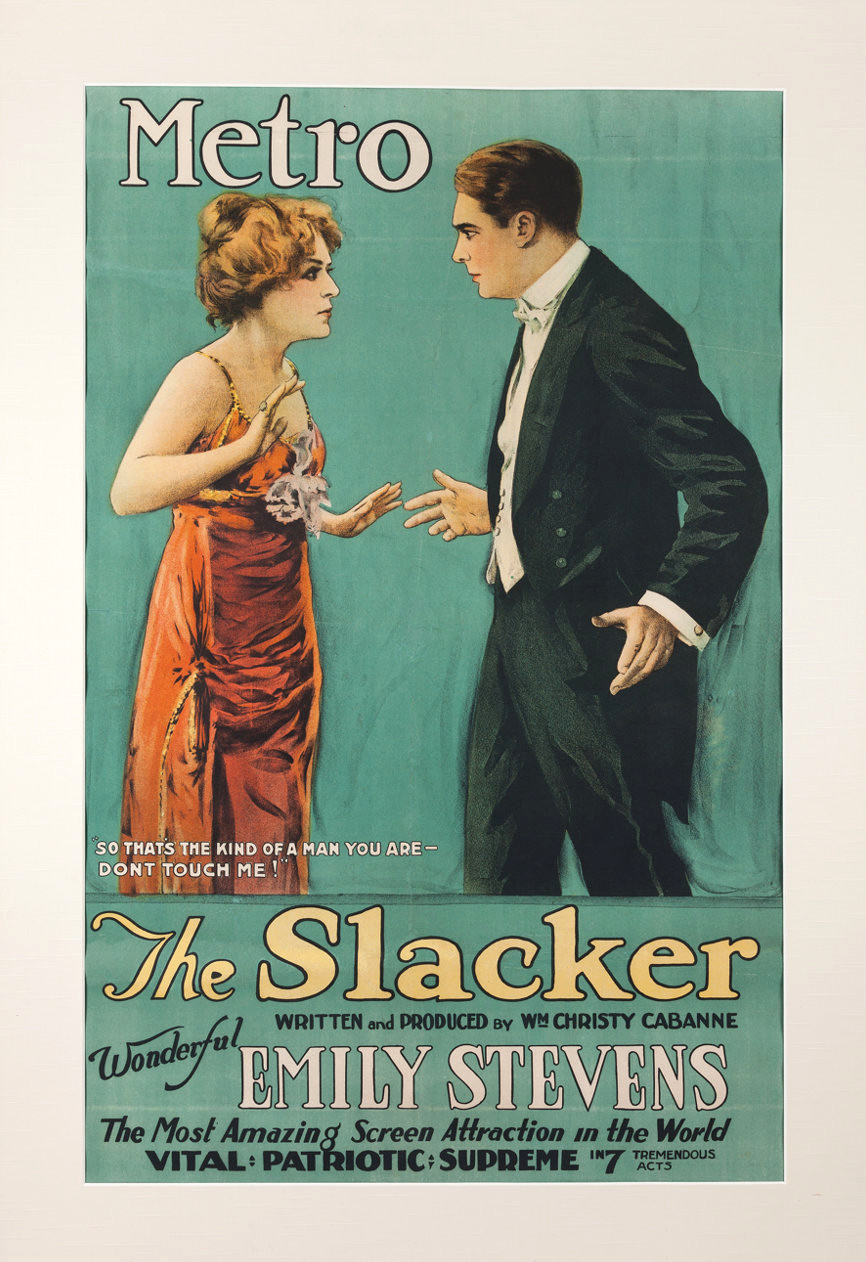
- Lobby Poster
- Directed by: Christy Cabanne
- Starring: Emily Stevens
- Cinematography: William Fildew
- Edited by: Mildred Richter
- Production company: Metro Pictures
- Distributed by: Metro Pictures
- Release date: July 16, 1917
- Running time: 6 or 7 reels
- Country: United States
- Language: Silent (English intertitles)

The Slacker is a 1917 American silent drama film directed by Christy Cabanne and starring Emily Stevens. It was produced and distributed by Metro Pictures.

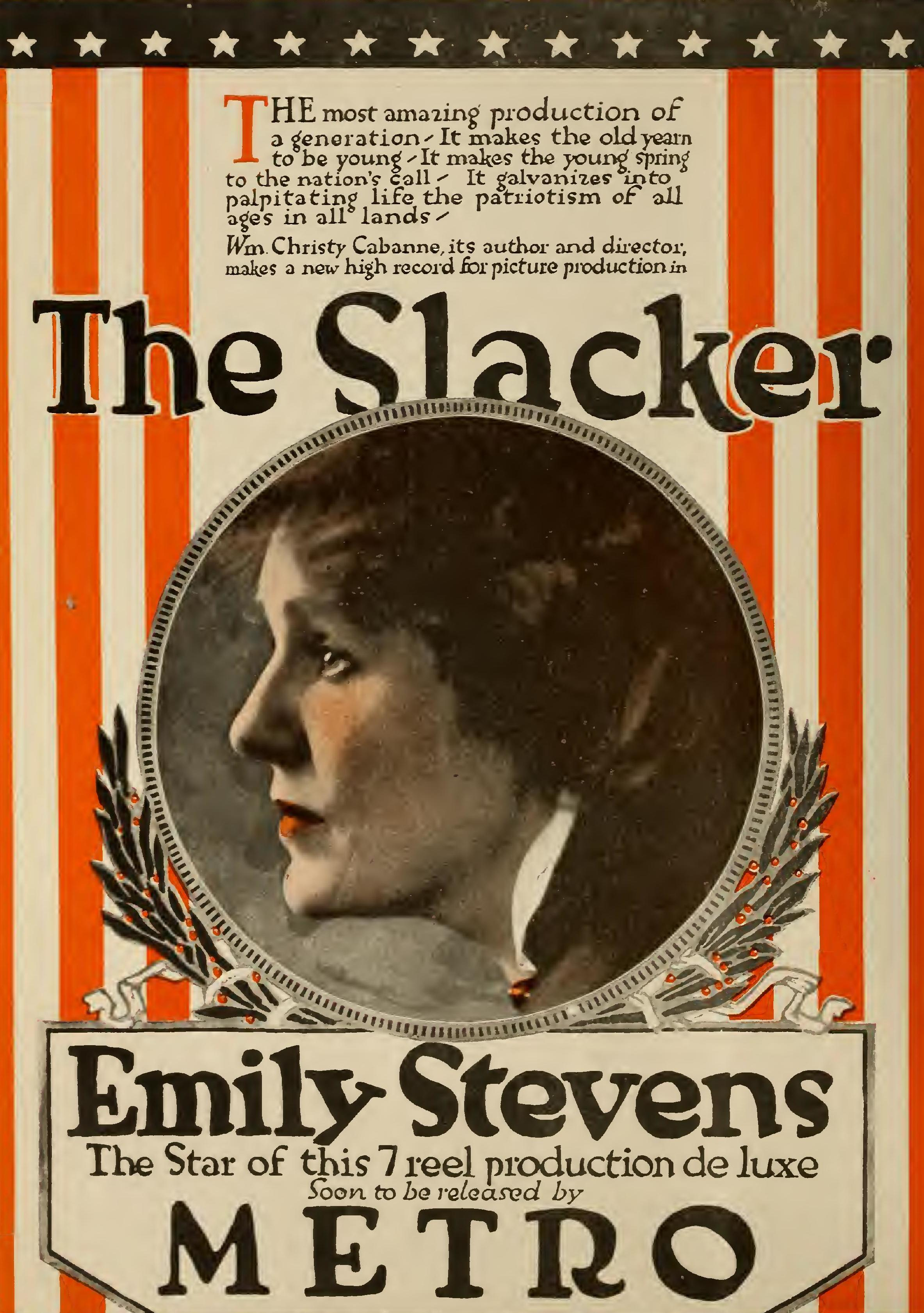
The Slacker ad in Motion Picture News, 1917

A popular film with the U.S. Army causing a spike in Army recruitment just after the US entry into World War I.

== Cast ==
- Emily Stevens as Margaret Christy
- Walter Miller as Robert Wallace
- Leo Delaney as John Harding
- Daniel Jarrett as Henry Wallace
- Eugene Borden as George Wallace
- Millicent Fisher as Virginia Lambert
- Sue Balfour as Mrs. Christy
- Mathilde Brundage as Mrs. McAllister
- Ivy Ward as Child with Flag (credited as Baby Ivy Ward)
- Charles Fang as Valet
- Belle Bruce - ?
- Dorothy Haydel - ?
- W. E. Lawrence - ?
- Gilbert P. Hamilton - ?
- Evelyn Converse - ?

== Preservation ==
The film is preserved by MGM with possible deposit at George Eastman House.
