= The Wreck (1927 film) =

1927 film directed by Ben Wilson

- Directed by: William J. Craft
- Written by: Dorothy Howell
- Produced by: Harry Cohn
- Starring: Shirley Mason; Malcolm McGregor; Francis McDonald
- Cinematography: William E. Fildew
- Production company: Columbia Pictures
- Release date: February 5, 1927 (US)
- Running time: 6 reels
- Country: United States
- Language: English

The Wreck is a 1927 lost American silent melodrama film directed by Ben Wilson and starring Shirley Mason, Malcolm McGregor, and Francis McDonald. It was released on February 5, 1927.

== Cast list ==
- Shirley Mason as Ann
- Malcolm McGregor as Robert
- Francis McDonald as Joe
- James Bradbury Jr.
- Barbara Tennant
- Frances Raymond as Robert's mother
