= The Barricade (1917 film) =

- Directed by: Edwin Carewe
- Written by: June Mathis; Hamilton Smith
- Produced by: B.A. Rolfe
- Starring: Mabel Taliaferro; Frank Currier; Clifford Bruce
- Cinematography: John Arnold
- Production company: Rolfe Photoplays
- Distributed by: Metro Pictures
- Release date: March 5, 1917
- Running time: 50 minutes
- Country: United States
- Languages: Silent; English intertitles

The Barricade is a 1917 American silent drama film directed by Edwin Carewe and starring Mabel Taliaferro, Frank Currier and Clifford Bruce.

== Cast ==
- Mabel Taliaferro as Hope Merrill
- Frank Currier as Amos Merrill
- Clifford Bruce as John Cook
- Robert Rendel as Gerald Hastings
- Emile Collins as Butler
- Lorna Volare as Flower Girl
- Mary Doyle as Flower Girl

== Preservation ==
With no prints of The Barricade located in any film archives, it is considered a lost film.

== Bibliography ==
- Lowe, Denise. An Encyclopedic Dictionary of Women in Early American Films: 1895-1930. Routledge, 2014.
