= Unseeing Eyes =

1923 film by Edward H. Griffith

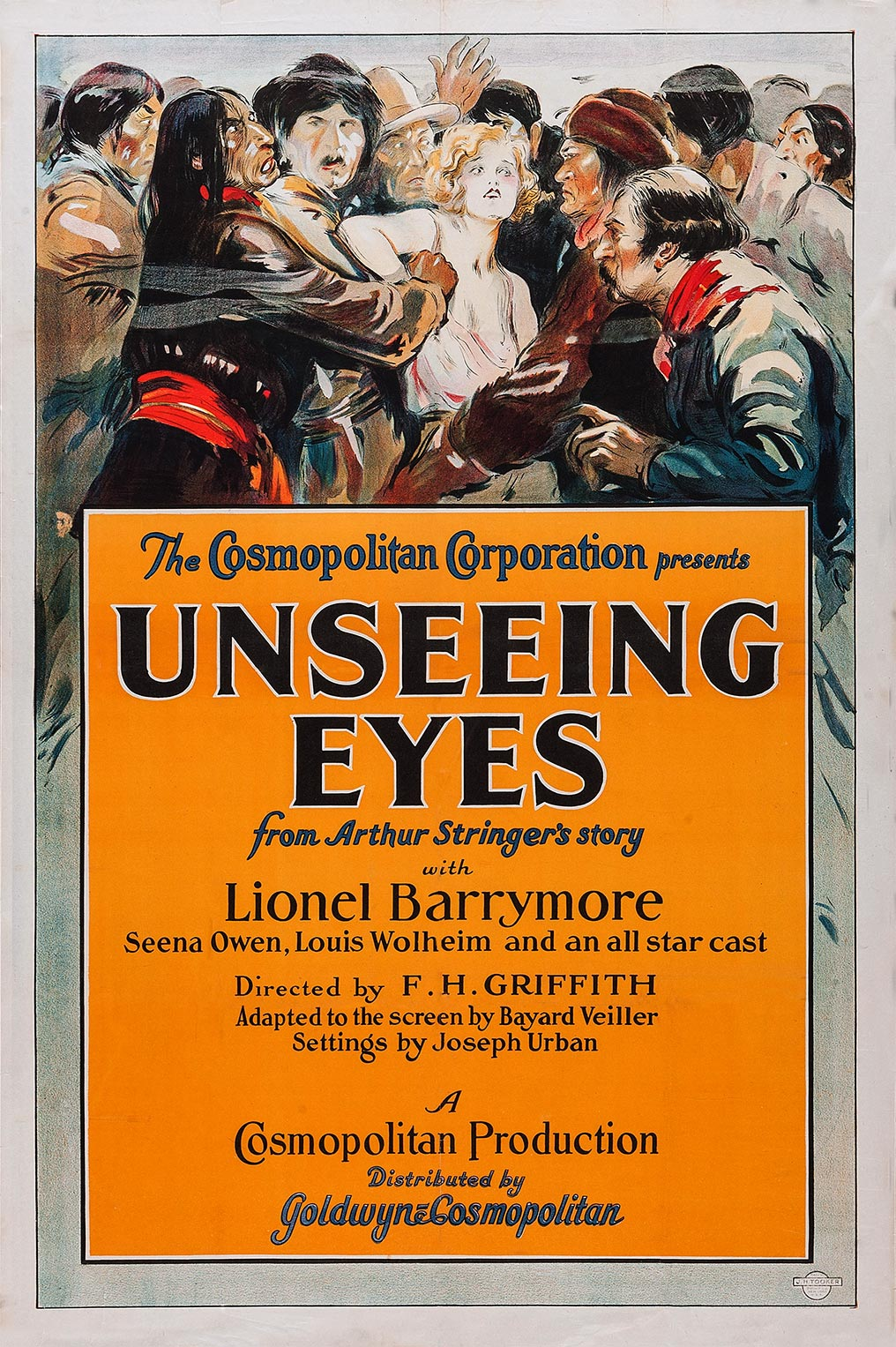
- Theatrical poster
- Directed by: Edward H. Griffith; Bert Siebel (ass't director)
- Written by: Bayard Veiller (scenario)
- Based on: "Snowblind" by Arthur Stringer
- Produced by: William Randolph Hearst
- Starring: Lionel Barrymore; Seena Owen; Louis Wolheim
- Cinematography: Al Siegler; John La Mond
- Production company: Cosmopolitan Productions
- Distributed by: Goldwyn Pictures
- Release date: November 18, 1923
- Running time: 9 reels; 8,150 feet
- Country: United States
- Language: Silent (English intertitles)

Unseeing Eyes is a lost 1923 American silent north country drama film produced by William Randolph Hearst and distributed by Goldwyn Pictures. Edward H. Griffith directed Lionel Barrymore, Seena Owen, Louis Wolheim, and Gustav von Seyffertitz in the action packed drama.

== Cast ==
- Lionel Barrymore as Conrad Dean
- Seena Owen as Miriam Helston
- Louis Wolheim as Laird
- Gustav von Seyffertitz as Father Paquette
- Walter Miller as Dick Helston
- Charles Byer as Mr. Arkwright
- Helen Lindroth as Mrs. Arkwright
- Jack W. Johnston as Trapper (credited as Jack Johnston)
- Louis Deer as Eagle Blanket
- Francis Red Eagle as Singing Pine
- Dan Red Eagle as Halfbreed
- Paul Panzer as Halfbreed
- Mayo Methot as Extra (uncredited)

== Production ==
Unseeing Eyes was filmed partially on location at the Gray Rocks Resort in the Laurentian Mountains. Additional scenes were reportedly shot at Lake Louise in Banff National Park.

== Censorship ==
Before the film could be exhibited in Kansas, the Kansas Board of Review required the removal of several scenes. Eliminations in reel 6: tearing off woman's dress, man's hand forced into hot stove, closeup of man with knife, and shorten fighting scene. Reel 7: elimination of man being hanged and shooting of hand and the following intertitle.

== See also ==
- Lionel Barrymore filmography
