= An Image of the Past =

1915 film

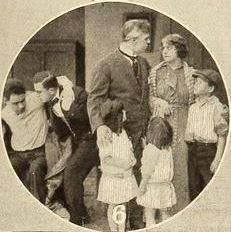
- Film still with Charles Cosgrave and Seena Owen, and J.H. Allen in the back room. The names of the three child actors are not recorded.
- Directed by: Tod Browning
- Starring: Seena Owen
- Production company: Majestic Motion Picture Company
- Distributed by: Mutual Film
- Release date: March 30, 1915
- Running time: 1 reel
- Country: United States
- Languages: Silent; English intertitles

An Image of the Past is a 1915 American short drama film directed by Tod Browning. It is not known whether the film currently survives, suggesting that it may be a lost film.

== Plot ==
As recorded in a film magazine, Jessie Curtis elopes with artist Jack Dexter. Her wealthy father, in a fury, disinherits her. He repulses all of his daughter's attempts at reconciliation, and ten years pass. Jack has been very ill and the family is penniless. The three children dress themselves as a gypsy, Indian, and sailor and with face masks, and go out to sing in the street. They make their way to their grandfather's house and sing below the windows. the old man is having one of his unendurably lonely hours, filled with regretful dreams of Jessie. When he hears the children singing, he calls them in, listens to their story, and promises that he will give them money for their sick father. Suddenly one of the youngsters rushes across the room to a portrait of Jessie that had been painted by Dexter at her father's order from a photograph of her when she was seven years old. "Why is my sister's picture in your house?" the small boy asks as he removes the mask from his sister's face. The grandfather learns the truth. He returns with the children to the rescue of his daughter and her husband.

== Cast ==
- J. H. Allen as Jack Dexter
- Charles Cosgrave as Mr. Curtis
- Seena Owen as Jessie Dexter
