= The Lamb (1915 film) =

1915 film

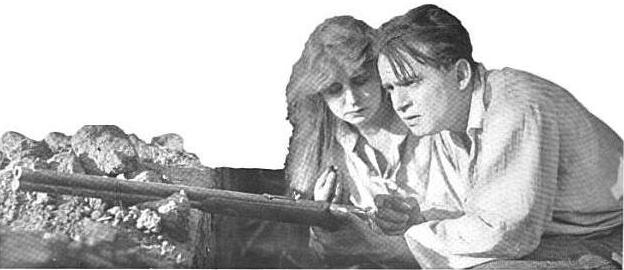
- Seena Owen, Douglas Fairbanks in The Lamb
- Directed by: W. Christy Cabanne
- Screenplay by: Christy Cabanne
- Story by: Granville Warwick
- Based on: The New Henrietta by Bronson Howard, Victor Mapes and Winchell Smith
- Starring: Douglas Fairbanks; Seena Owen
- Cinematography: William E. Fildew
- Distributed by: Triangle Distributing
- Release dates: September 23, 1915 (New York City); November 7, 1915 (Nationwide)
- Running time: 56 minutes
- Country: United States
- Languages: Silent; English intertitles

The Lamb is a 1915 American silent comedy/Western film featuring Douglas Fairbanks in his first starring role. Directed by W. Christy Cabanne, the film is based on the popular 1913 Broadway play The New Henrietta, in which Fairbanks co-starred with William H. Crane, Amelia Bingham and a very young Patricia Collinge.

== Cast ==
- Douglas Fairbanks – Gerald
- Seena Owen – Mary
- William E. Lowery – Yaqui Indian Chief
- Lillian Langdon – Mary's Mother
- Monroe Salisbury – Mary's Cousin
- Kate Toncray – Gerald's Mother
- Alfred Paget – Bill Cactus
- Eagle Eye – Yaqui Indian Chief
- Tom Kennedy – White Hopeless (uncredited)
- Julia Faye – Woman (uncredited)
- Charles Stevens – Lieute nant (uncredited)
- Mary Thurman – extra role (uncredited)

== Production ==
D. W. Griffith, writing under the pseudonym Granville Barker, along with director Christy Cabanne, essentially expanded the play beyond the plush nouveau riche apartment setting of the play, and provided a western element to the story. This would give Fairbanks a chance to show his physical prowess cinematically and loosen the play from what would be stage bound constraints. Griffith also altered characters; Fairbanks' character's name is changed to Gerald, with his parent being his mother (Kate Toncray), whereas in the play his character was named Nick with his parent being his father played by Crane.

== Reception ==
Distributed by Triangle Film Corporation, the film premiered at the Knickerbocker Theater in New York City on September 23, 1915 along with the Keystone The Valet and The Iron Strain. The Lamb outperformed the other two features and was a hit with audiences and critics who praised Fairbanks' performance.

== Preservation ==
Complete copies of the film are held by George Eastman House and UCLA Film & Television Archive.
