= William Fildew =

American cinematographer

- Born: February 25, 1890; Detroit, Michigan, United States
- Died: July 17, 1943 (aged 53); Los Angeles, California, United States
- Occupation: Cinematographer
- Years active: 1915–27

William Ewart Fildew, billed as either William Fildew or William E. Fildew, was an American cinematographer during the silent film era. He shot 54 films between 1915 and 1927. His first film was 1915's The Lost House, directed by Christy Cabanne and starring Lillian Gish. That same year he also shot Martyrs of the Alamo, directed by Cabanne, which was the first film in which Douglas Fairbanks appeared. Fairbanks' first starring role, also in 1915, was The Lamb, which Fildew also shot. His final film was The Wreck, directed by William James Craft and starring Shirley Mason and Malcolm McGregor.

== Filmography ==
(Per AFI database)

- Martyrs of the Alamo (1915)
- Double Trouble (1915)
- The Absentee (1915)
- Enoch Arden (1915)
- The Failure (1915)
- The Lost House (1915)
- The Lamb (1915)
- Flirting with Fate (1916)
- Reggie Mixes In (1916)
- Daphne and the Pirate (1916)
- Sold for Marriage (1916)
- One of Many (1917)
- Draft 258 (1917)
- The Slacker (1917)
- The Return of Mary (1917)
- Miss Robinson Crusoe (1917)
- The Testing of Mildred Vane (1918)
- The Fair Pretender (1918)
- Her Inspiration (1918)
- Heart of the Sunset (1918)
- The Danger Game (1918)
- Cyclone Higgins, D.D. (1918)
- Peggy Does Her Darndest (1919)
- God's Outlaw (1919)
- Almost Married (1919)
- In for Thirty Days (1919)
- The Pointing Finger (1919)
- The Petal on the Current (1919)
- Castles in the Air (1919)
- The Island of Intrigue (1919)
- Bonnie, Bonnie Lassie (1919)
- Through Eyes of Men (1920)
- Blue Streak McCoy (1920)
- The Virgin of Stamboul (1920)
- Outside the Law (1920)
- No Woman Knows (1921)
- Society Secrets (1921)
- The Magnificent Brute (1921)
- A Parisian Scandal (1921)
- Oh Mary Be Careful (1921)
- The Fox (1921)
- The Blazing Trail (1921)
- The Wise Kid (1922)
- Under Two Flags (1922)
- Paid Back (1922)
- Broad Daylight (1922)
- White Tiger (1923)
- The Self-Made Wife (1923)
- Drifting (1923)
- The Day of Faith (1923)
- The Reckless Age (1924)
- Fools Highway (1924)
- A Daughter of the Sioux (1925)
- The Wreck (1927)
