= Charles Fang =

American actor and comedian

- Born: Charles J. Fang; August 10, 1882; San Francisco, California, US
- Died: Unknown
- Occupation: Actor

Charles Fang was an American actor and comedian who was active in Hollywood primarily during the silent era. He was active on Broadway from 1930 to 1935. He was known in his time as "the greatest Chinese actor in America."

== Biography ==
Fang was born in San Francisco to parents from Canton, China. He reportedly graduated from Yale University and served in the U.S. Navy before becoming a professional actor on the stage and screen. Reportedly discovered by Rex Ingram, Fang also served as a cultural advisor and interpreter on film sets.

== Selected filmography ==
- My Sin (1931)
- Sunken Silver (1925)
- Haldane of the Secret Service (1923)
- The Ragged Edge (1923)
- Backbone (1923)
- Jacqueline (1923)
- Married People (1922)
- Boomerang Bill (1922)
- Dream Street (1921)
- Pagan Love (1920)
- Checkers (1919)
- God's Outlaw (1919)
- Mandarin's Gold (1919)
- Cheerful Liars (1918)
- Fate and Fortune (1918)
- Feet and Defeat (1918)
- Parson Pepp (1918)
- The Chinese Musketeer (1918)
- The Ring and the Ringer (1918)
- The Forbidden City (1918)
- Nuts and Noodles (1918)
- Cyclone Higgins, D.D. (1918)
- The Jury of Fate (1917)
- The Slacker (1917)
- The Great Secret (1917)
- In the Diplomatic Service (1916)
- Broken Fetters (1916)
