= Dangerous Paradise (1930 film) =

1930 film

- Directed by: William A. Wellman
- Written by: Grover Jones; William Slavens McNutt
- Based on: Victory by Joseph Conrad
- Produced by: B.P. Schulberg
- Starring: Nancy Carroll; Richard Arlen; Warner Oland; Gustav von Seyffertitz
- Cinematography: Archie Stout
- Music by: John Leipold
- Production company: Paramount Pictures
- Distributed by: Paramount Pictures
- Release date: February 13, 1930
- Running time: 58 minutes
- Country: United States
- Language: English

Dangerous Paradise is a 1930 American pre-Code drama film directed by William A. Wellman and starring Nancy Carroll, Richard Arlen and Warner Oland.

The film is an adaptation of Joseph Conrad's 1915 novel Victory, with the significant change of a happy ending introduced to the plot which acknowledged a similar change made in the 1919 silent film Victory directed by Maurice Tourneur. As was common in the early years of sound, Dangerous Paradise was remade in several different languages by Paramount at the Joinville Studios in Paris.

== Cast ==
- Nancy Carroll as Alma
- Richard Arlen as Heyst
- Warner Oland as Schomberg
- Gustav von Seyffertitz as Mr. Jones
- Francis McDonald as Ricardo
- George Kotsonaros as Pedro
- Dorothea Wolbert as Mrs. Schomberg
- Clarence Wilson as Zangiacomo
- Evelyn Selbie as Mrs. Zangiacomo
- Willie Fung as Wang

== Bibliography ==
- Moore, Gene M. Conrad on Film. Cambridge University Press, 2006.
