= Seena Owen =

American actress (1894–1966)

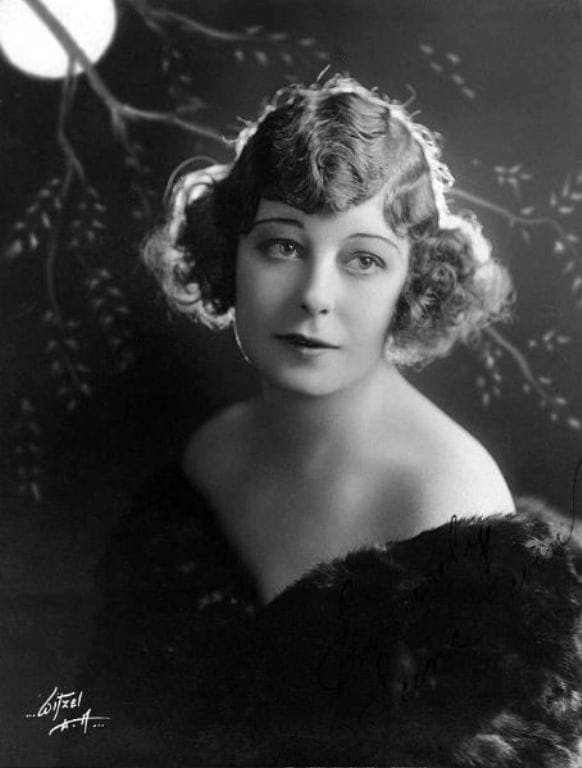
- Owen, c. 1920
- Born: Signe Auen; November 14, 1894; Spokane, Washington, U.S.
- Died: August 15, 1966 (aged 71); Los Angeles, California, U.S.
- Resting place: Hollywood Forever Cemetery
- Spouse: George Walsh (m. 1916; div. 1924)
- Children: 1
- Relatives: Lillie Hayward (sister)

Seena Owen (born Signe Auen; November 14, 1894 – August 15, 1966) was an American silent film actress and screenwriter.

== Early life ==
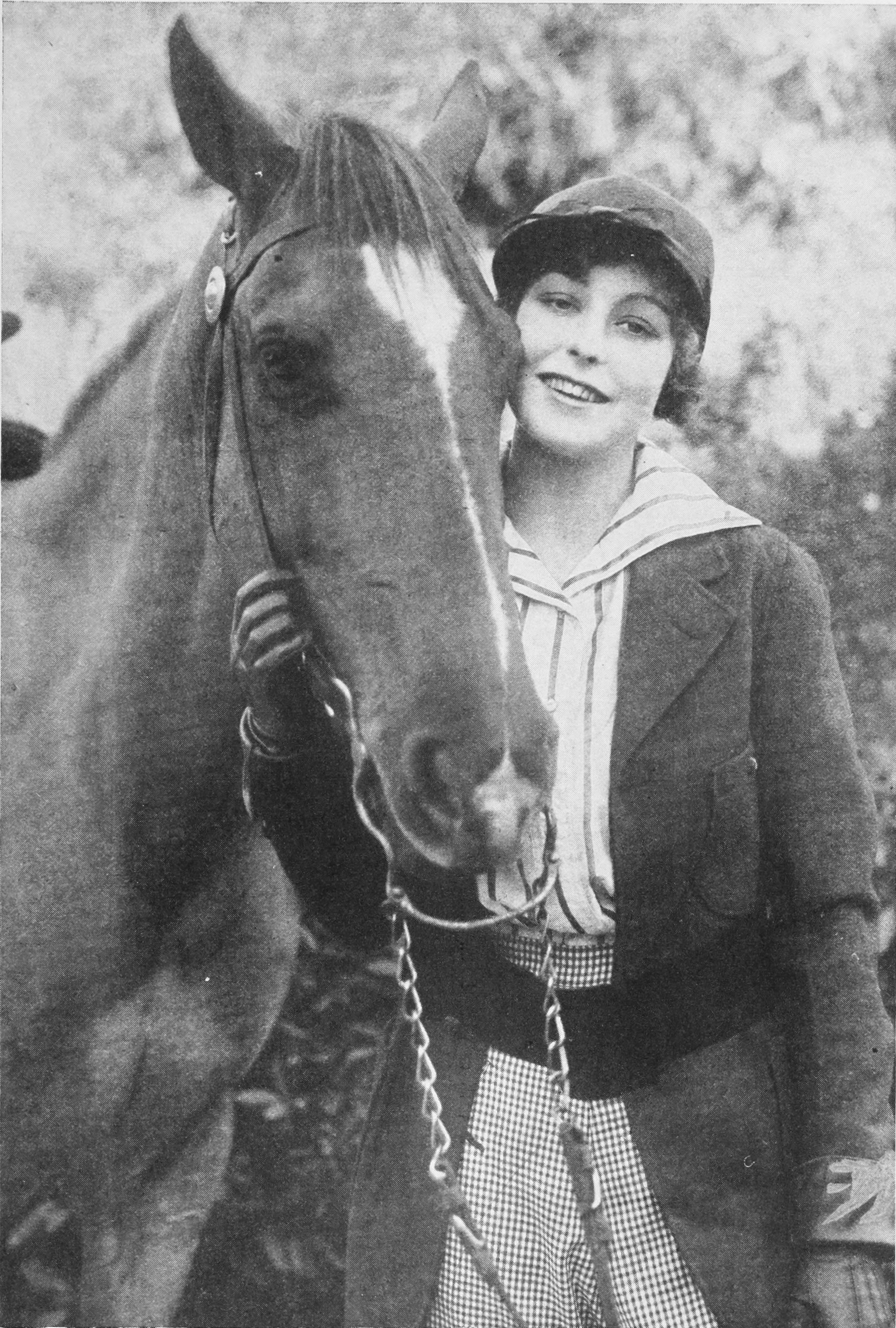
Owen, ca. 1917, Photoplay Magazine

Born Signe Auen in Spokane, Washington, she was the youngest of three children raised by Jens Christensen and Karen (née Sorensen) Auen. Her father and mother came from Denmark in the late 1880s and settled in Minnesota where they married in 1888. Within a short period of time they moved to Portland, Oregon and then Spokane, where her father became proprietor of the Columbia Pharmacy.

In her youth Owen was enrolled at Brunot Hall, an Episcopalian girls' school in Spokane, founded by Bishop Lemuel H. Wells. She was also educated in Copenhagen. Her life as the daughter of an affluent business owner changed in her late teens when the family business failed and it became necessary to seek employment. She received her early inspiration to act while a student at the Pauline Dunstan Belden School of Elocution in Spokane before appearing in a stock production in San Francisco playing the part of a maid for $5 a week. Soon after she went to Hollywood to work as a film extra, and had the good fortune to run into actor-director Marshall Neilan, then a Hollywood "boy wonder" whom Owen had known in Spokane. Through Neilan she was hired by the Kalem Company, an early motion picture studio, at $15 a week.

== Career ==
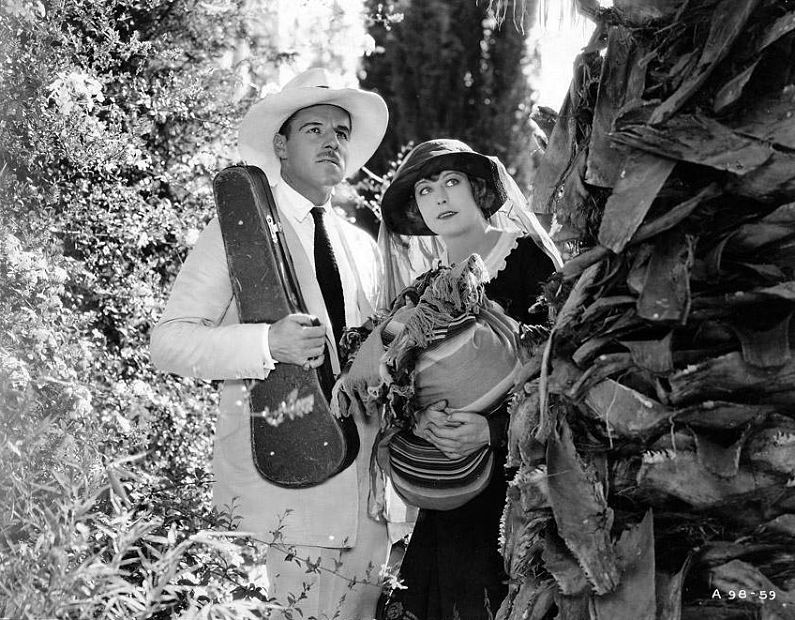
Jack Holt and Seena Owen in Victory

Her first important film was A Yankee from the West (1915) under the name Signe Auen at the age of 21. She later was convinced to change her name and settled on Seena Owen, the phonetic spelling of her real name. In 1916, she performed in D. W. Griffith's Intolerance. Griffith wanted her eyes to be twice as large and "supernatural", so he spoke to his wigmaker to create false lashes. They were made of human hair which were then fixed to her eyelashes by spirit gum. One day, Owen showed up with her eyes swollen nearly shut, her co-star Lillian Gish wrote in her memoir.

Also in 1916, Owen married George Walsh whom she had met on the set of Intolerance. The marriage lasted until their divorce in 1924. A regular player for the rest of the silent era, Owen appeared in films such as Maurice Tourneur's Victory in 1919 where she was photographed to great effect by Tourneur's cameraman, Rene Guissart. Victory, long lost, was recently found in 35mm print in Europe and can be seen on DVD. In 1920, she appeared in The Gift Supreme with Lon Chaney, who appeared with her in Victory. All but one reel of The Gift Supreme is lost. She co-starred with Gloria Swanson and Walter Byron in the ill-fated Queen Kelly (1928), as the mad queen who whips Swanson in one scene.

With the arrival of sound in movies, Owen's weak voice became a problem and forced her to retire from movies in 1933. After her retirement, she worked on a number of films in the 1930s and 1940s as a screenwriter, including two starring Dorothy Lamour: Aloma of the South Seas (1941) and Rainbow Island (1944). The former was written in part with her sister, Lillie Hayward, a successful Hollywood screenwriter.

== Death ==
Seena Owen died on August 15, 1966, at Hollywood Presbyterian Hospital, aged 71, and was interred at Hollywood Forever Cemetery.

== Partial filmography ==
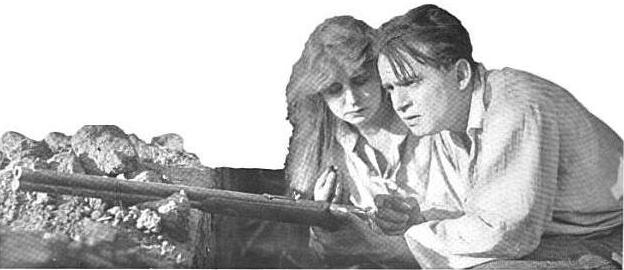
Seena Owen with Douglas Fairbanks in The Lamb (1915)

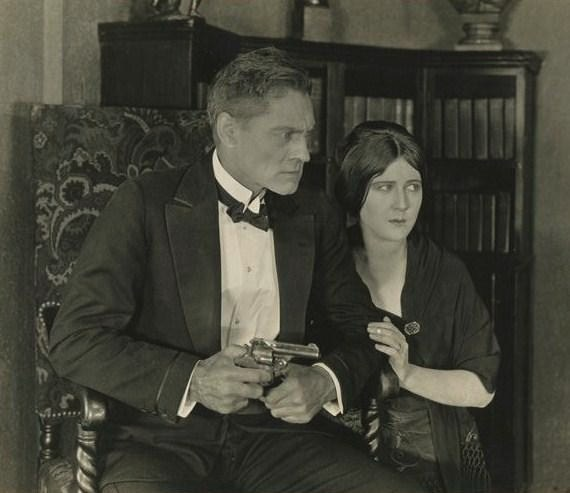
Lionel Barrymore and Seena Owen in The Face in the Fog (1922)

- The Old Fisherman's Story (1914)
- An Image of the Past (1915)
- The Highbinders (1915)
- Little Marie (1915)
- The Lamb (1915)
- The Penitentes (1915)
- A Yankee from the West (1915)
- Intolerance (1916)
- Madame Bo-Peep (1917)
- A Woman's Awakening (1917)
- Branding Broadway (1918)
- Breed of Men (1919)
- A Man and His Money (1919)
- The Sheriff's Son (1919)
- Riders of Vengeance (1919)
- One of the Finest (1919)
- The City of Comrades (1919)
- The Life Line (1919)
- A Fugitive from Matrimony (1919)
- Victory (1919) with Lon Chaney, Sr. and Wallace Beery
- The Gift Supreme (1920)
- Sooner or Later (1920)
- The Price of Redemption (1920)
- The House of Toys (1920)
- The Cheater Reformed (1921)
- Lavender and Old Lace (1921)
- The Woman God Changed (1921) (extant; Library of Congress)
- Back Pay (1922) (extant; Library of Congress)
- The Face in the Fog (1922) (*extant; Library of Congress)
- Sisters (1922)
- The Go-Getter (1923)
- Unseeing Eyes (1923)
- The Leavenworth Case (1923)
- The Great Well (1924)
- I Am the Man (1924)
- The Hunted Woman (1925)
- Shipwrecked (1926)
- The Flame of the Yukon (1926)
- The Blue Danube (1928)
- Man-Made Women (1928)
- His Last Haul (1928)
- Sinners in Love (1928)
- The Rush Hour (1928)
- The Marriage Playground (1929)
- Queen Kelly (1929)
- Officer Thirteen (1932)(last film)
