= Victory (1919 film) =

1919 film by Maurice Tourneur

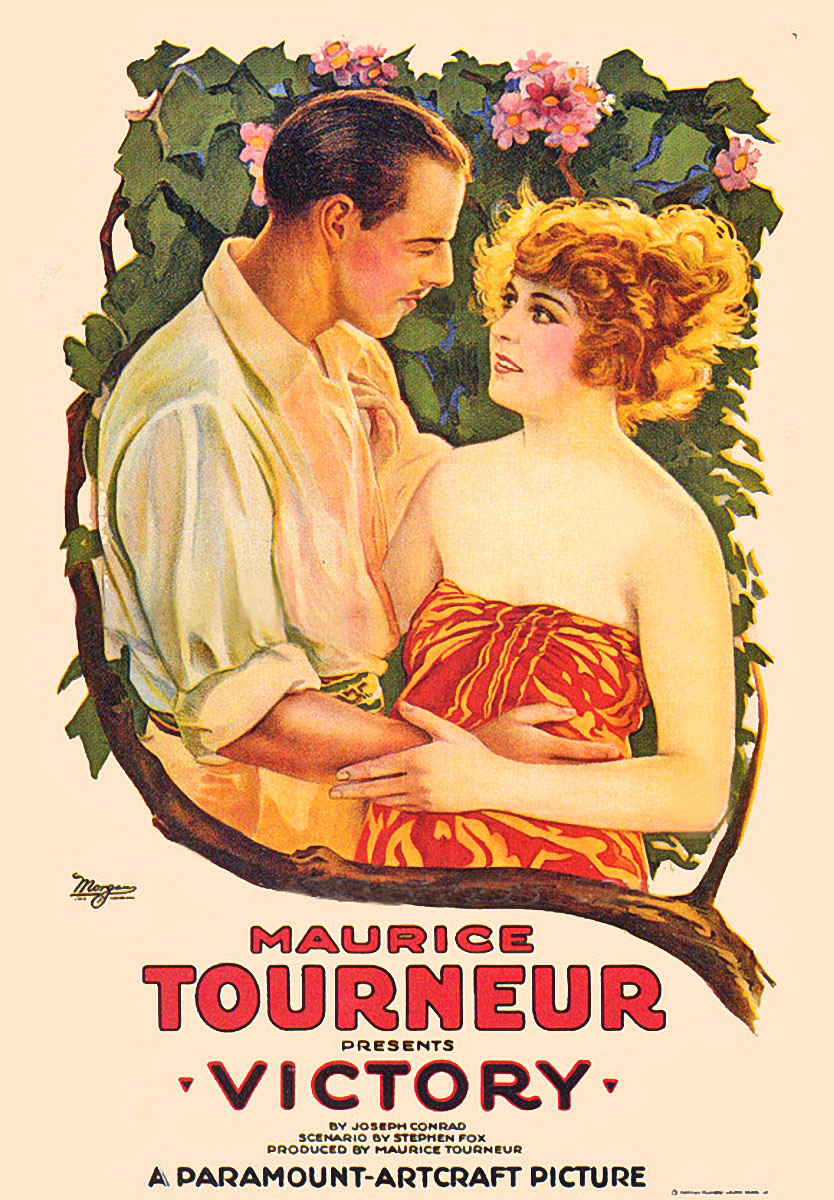
- Theatrical release poster
- Directed by: Maurice Tourneur
- Screenplay by: Jules Furthman (credited as Stephen Fox)
- Based on: Victory by Joseph Conrad
- Produced by: Maurice Tourneur
- Starring: Jack Holt; Seena Owen; Lon Chaney; Wallace Beery
- Cinematography: René Guissart
- Production company: Maurice Tourneur Productions
- Distributed by: Paramount-Artcraft Pictures
- Release date: December 7, 1919
- Running time: 62 minutes
- Country: United States
- Language: Silent (English intertitles)

Victory is a surviving 1919 American action film directed by Maurice Tourneur and starring Jack Holt, Seena Owen, Lon Chaney, Wallace Beery and Bull Montana. The film is an adaptation of the 1915 homonymous novel by Joseph Conrad (the only film adaptation of one of his works that he lived to see). The screenplay was written by Jules Furthman and Ben Carré was the art director.

The film was chosen by the New York Times as one of the top ten films of 1919. It was later remade in 1930 as Dangerous Paradise, and again in 1940 as Victory. The film still exists in its complete form in the Library of Congress and is available on DVD. A lobby card exists showing Lon Chaney in the role of Ricardo.

== Plot ==
Axel Heyst lives alone on a deserted island in the South Seas. When he travels to a neighboring island on business, he encounters a girl named Alma who works at the hotel. She is being abused by her boss, Mr. Schomberg/

Having pity on Alma, Axel takes her back to his, making it plain that he isn't seeking a romantic relations. When Schomberg discovers that Alma has escaped to Axel's island, he furious. Schomberg convinces three criminals (Mr. Jones, Ricardo and Pedro) to go after her. He them that the Island contains a hidden treasure.

The grimacing Ricardo is the most dangerous of the three, constantly cleaning his fingernails with a stiletto. The brutish Pedro follows Mr. Jones' orders slavishly. However, Pedro is unaware that Jones killed his brother years ago by burning him alive.

When the three men arrive on Axel's island, he welcomes them with hospitality. However, Axel soon realizes they plan to kill him and abduct Alma. When the fight starts, Axel shoots Ricardo dead on the roof. When Pedro learns that Jones killed his brother, Pedro burns him alive. Later on, Axel and Alma realize they love each other and decide to get married and live on the island.

== Cast ==
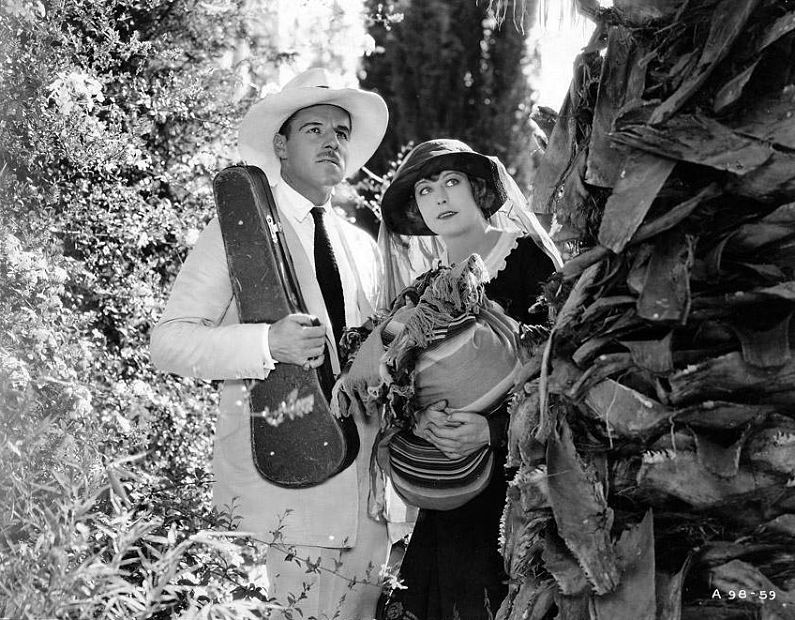
Jack Holt and Seena Owen in Victory

- Jack Holt as Axel Heyst
- Seena Owen as Alma
- Lon Chaney as Ricardo
- Wallace Beery as August Schomberg
- Ben Deeley as Mr. Jones
- Laura Winston as Mrs. Schomberg
- Bull Montana as Pedro
- George Nichols as Captain Davidson

== Reception ==
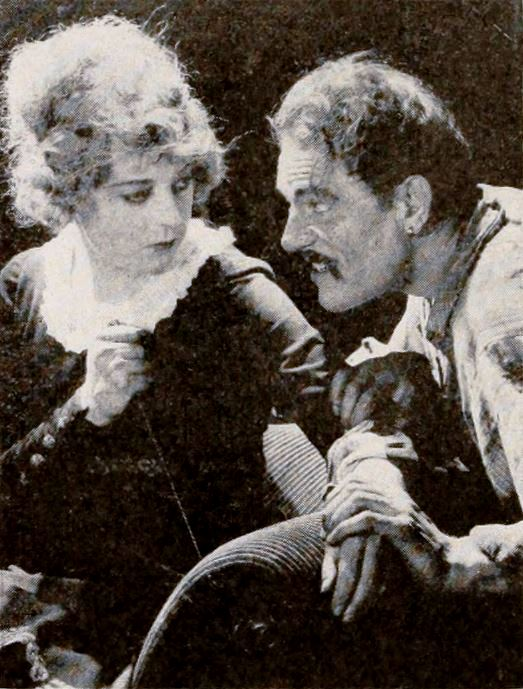
Seena Owen and Lon Chaney

The film itself.

"The characterization of Lon Chaney as Ricardo and that of Bull Montana as Pedro were especially well handled." ---Wid's Film Daily

"The vividly vicious work of Lon Chaney as Ricardo deserves more than passing mention... In fact, Mr. Chaney may be said to "run away with the play" at certain stages, completely overshadowing his contemporaries." ---Exhibitors Trade Review

"An original and interesting picture, picturesque in detail, splendid types, a refreshing change from the conventional in nearly all respects." ---Moving Picture World

"Maurice Tourneur has created a moving and effective picture drama for Paramount.....Probably the eagle eye of the censor is responsible for cutting the fight between Alma and Ricardo, but it is well cut. Of the latter character, Lon Chaney gave a visualization that was very effective." ---Variety

In 1919, December 28, he New York Times published a review on Victory's three antagonists: Mr. Jones, their leader; Ricardo, his secretary, portrayed by Lon Chaney; and Pedro, his strongman. The review singled out Chaney's performance as Ricardo, praising his portrayal of an intense and distinctive character and contrasting his controlled acting style with what the reviewer described as the exaggerated performances of some other actors.
