= The Eyes of Mystery =

1918 film by Tod Browning

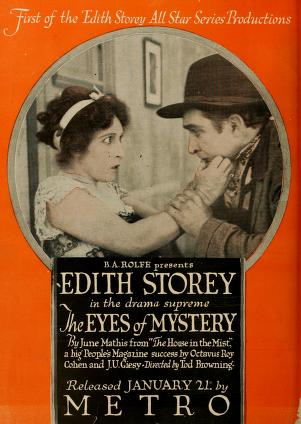
- Film advertisement
- Directed by: Tod Browning
- Written by: Octavus Roy Cohen; J. U. Giesy; June Mathis
- Produced by: B. A. Rolfe
- Starring: Edith Storey; Bradley Barker
- Cinematography: Harry Leslie Keepers
- Distributed by: Metro Pictures Corporation
- Release date: January 21, 1918
- Running time: 5 reels; (1,500 meters)
- Country: United States
- Language: Silent (English intertitles)

The Eyes of Mystery is a lost 1918 American silent mystery film directed by Tod Browning starring Edith Storey.

== Plot ==
As described in a film magazine, Carma Carmichael, who lives with her uncle Quincy Carmichael, is kidnapped by her father and held for ransom. In order to trap the criminals and secure Jack Carrington as Carma's husband, Quincy fakes his death and makes Jack his heir. Carma is angered by her uncle's action is determined to take her rightful place. By going through some of her uncle's papers, she discovers that the man she believes to be her father is an impostor and that her father is dead. Carma's supposed father and a group of moonshiners attack the Carmichael home and are fought off by Carma, Jack, and a friend. Quincy, believing it is time to return to life, does so in time to get the sheriff's posse on the house grounds, drive off the moonshiners, and capture the crooks.

== Cast ==
- Edith Storey as Carma Carmichael
- Bradley Barker as Jack Carrington
- Harry Northrup as Roger Carmichael (credited as Harry S. Northrup)
- Frank Andrews as Quincy Carmichael
- Kempton Greene as Steve Graham
- Frank Bennett as Seth Megget (credited as Frank Fisher Bennett)
- Louis Wolheim as Brad Tilton (credited as Louis R. Wolheim)
- Anthony Byrd as Uncle George
- Pauline Dempsey as Aunt Liza
- Monte Blue *uncredited role

== Reception ==
Like many American films of the time, The Eyes of Mystery was subject to cuts by city and state film censorship boards. For example, the Chicago Board of Censors required a cut, in Reel 1, of slugging a man, Reel 4, the vision of shooting Carma's father, Reel 5, five views of moonshiners shooting at house, Carma shooting man in white and shooting man out of tree, throwing man over porch, two scenes of breaking door with ax, closeup of shooting where Carma is used as a shield, overseer shooting Carma's father and he shooting overseer.
