= The Lucky Transfer =

1915 film

- Directed by: Tod Browning
- Written by: Russell E. Smith
- Starring: Mary Alden; Tom Wilson
- Release date: March 10, 1915
- Running time: 1 reel
- Country: United States
- Language: Silent with English intertitles

The Lucky Transfer is a 1915 American short drama film directed by Tod Browning. It was Browning's debut film as a director.

== Cast ==
- Mary Alden as Helen Holland
- Tom Wilson as Ford
- Thomas Hull as Ransom
- Vester Pegg as The clerk
- Margery Wilson as The little girl
- Jack Hull as Jim Dodson
- William Lowery as Fields, the detective
- Sydney Lewis Ransome (as Doc Ransome)
- William Hinckley (unconfirmed)
