= The Legion of Death =

1918 film

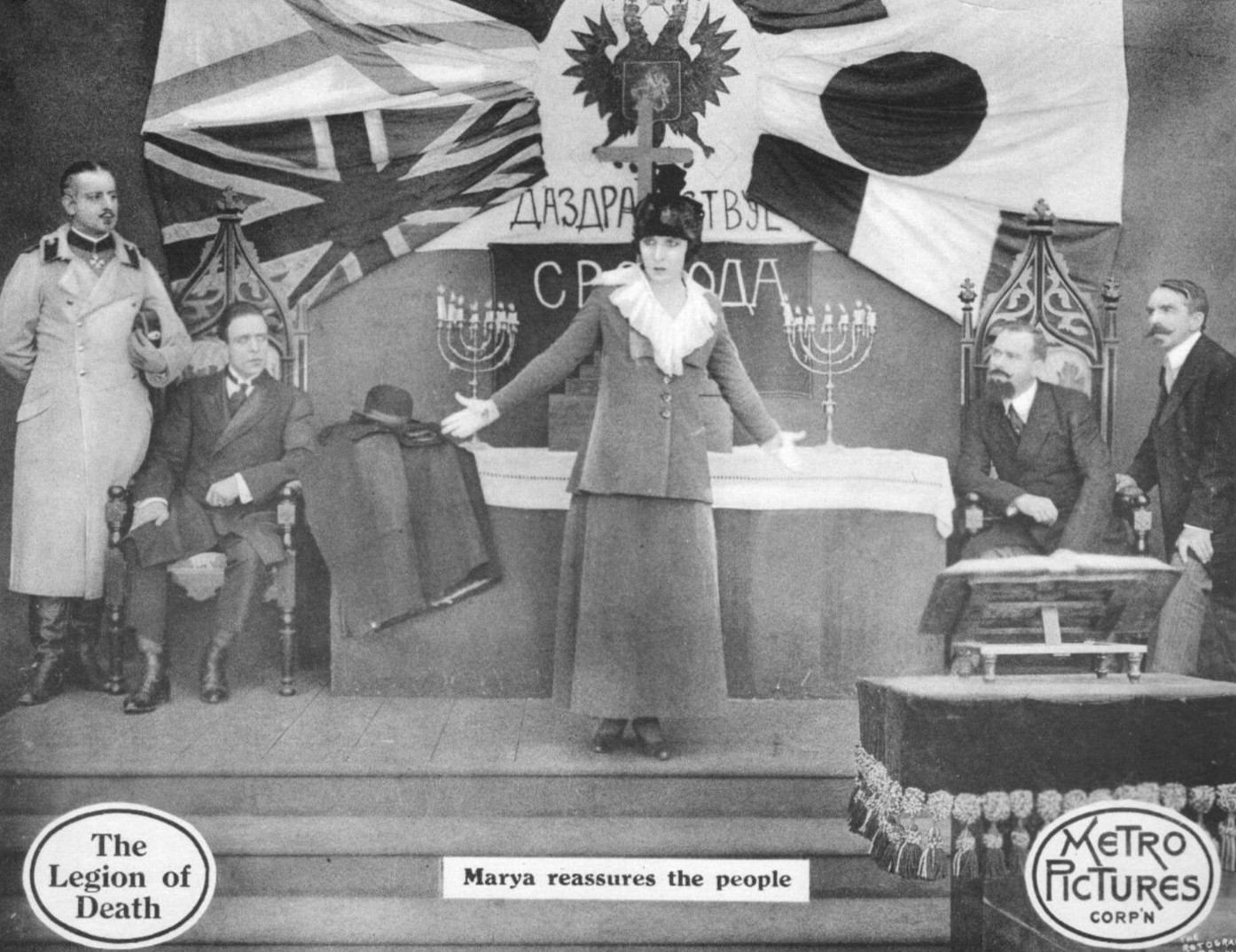
- Lobby card
- Directed by: Tod Browning
- Written by: June Mathis
- Starring: Edith Storey; Philo McCullough
- Cinematography: Harry Leslie Keepers
- Distributed by: Metro Pictures
- Release date: January 1918
- Running time: 7 reels
- Country: United States
- Language: Silent (English intertitles)

The Legion of Death is a 1918 American silent drama film directed by Tod Browning, and released by Metro Pictures Corporation.

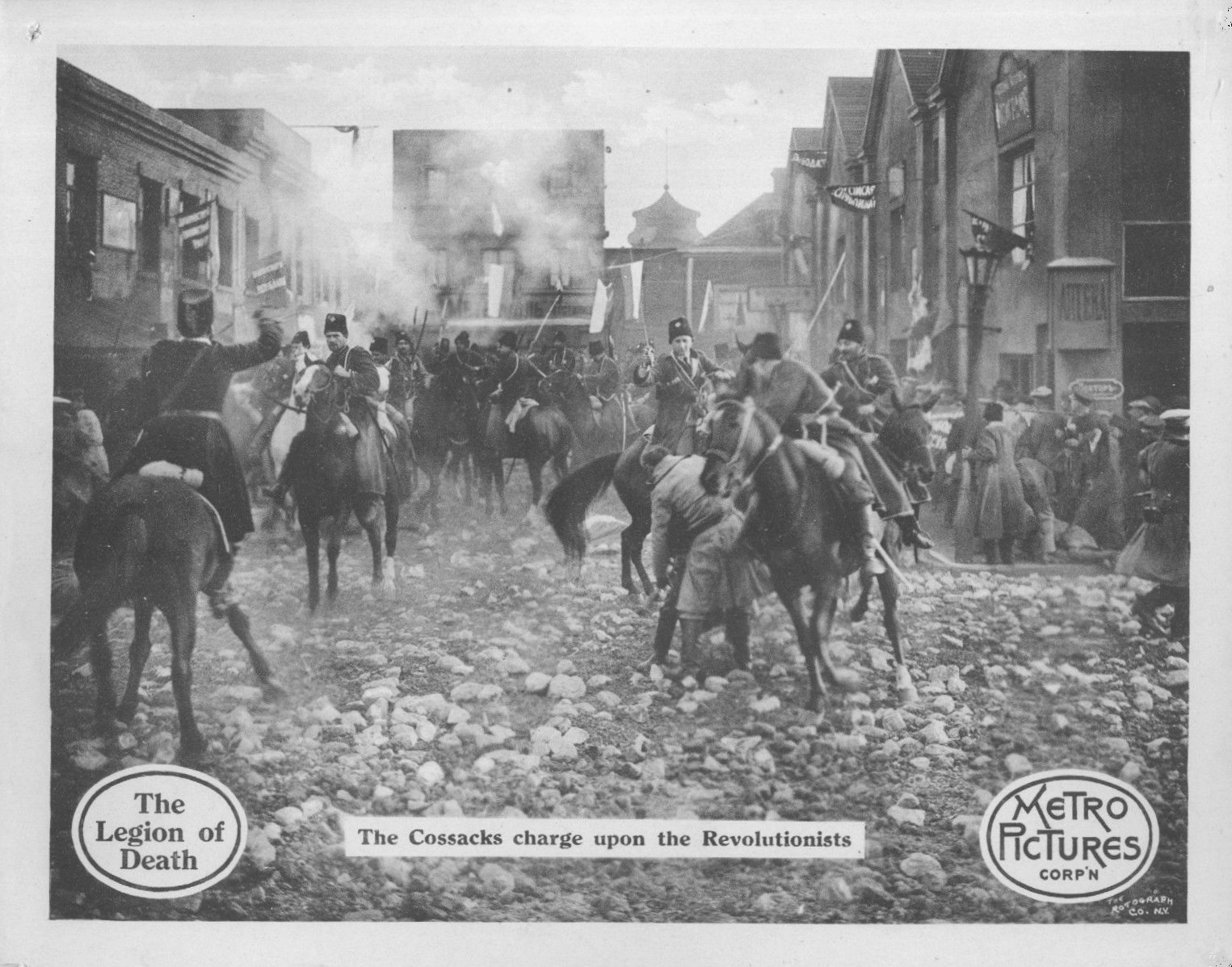
Lobby card

== Plot ==
As described in a film magazine, determined to lay down her life if necessary for her country, Princess Marya mobilizes an army of Russian peasant women and is stationed in one of the front line trenches. German forces are about to overrun her battery when American volunteers arrive, and the Germans are dispelled. With autocracy abolished in Russia, Marya consents to become the wife of American Captain Rodney Willard.

== Cast ==
- Edith Storey as Princess Marya
- Philo McCullough as Captain Rodney Willard
- Fred Malatesta as Grand Duke Paul
- Charles K. Gerrard as Grand Duke Orlof
- Pomeroy Cannon as Dmitri
- Norma Nichols as Draya
- R.O. Pennell as Czar
- Grace Aide as Czarina
- H.L. Swisher as Kerensky
- Francis Marion as Czarevitch
- Harry Moody as Makar
- Irene Aldwyn
- Junior Beckner

== Reception ==
Like many American films of the time, The Legion of Death was subject to cuts by city and state film censorship boards. For example, the Chicago Board of Censors initially issued a set of required cuts in early March 1918, but the distributor requested a rehearing by the Board. On further review, the Board reduced the cuts to the following: in Reel 1, the slugging of a man, Reel 2, two struggle scenes between German officer and young woman, striking her mother on head, five scenes of officer leering at young woman, tearing gown from young woman's shoulders, all visions scenes of young woman after the intertitle "And when the raiders left", and, Reel 7, the struggle scene between Marya and Orlof where he opens her waist.
