= Dollar Down =

1925 film

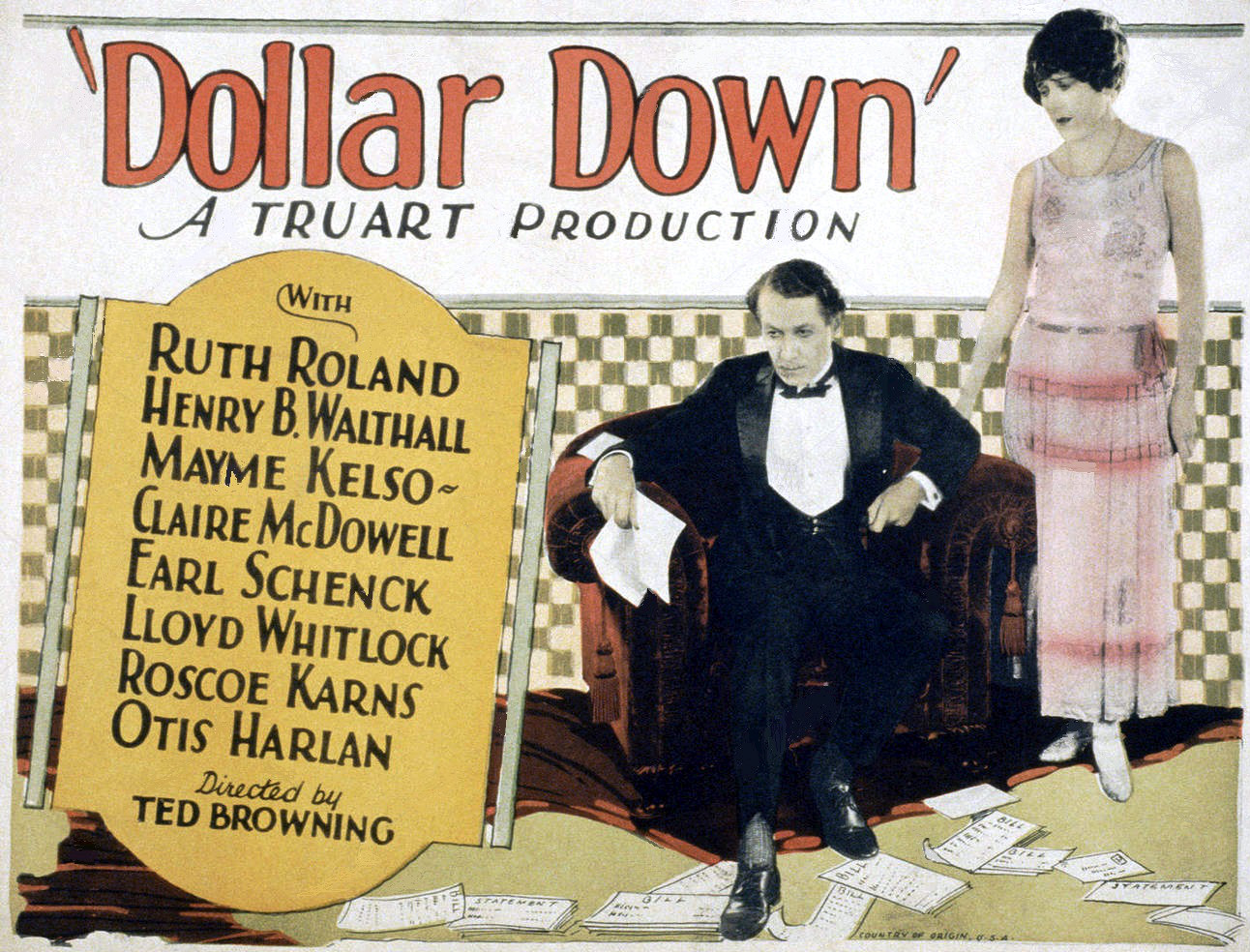
- Lobby card
- Directed by: Tod Browning
- Screenplay by: Frederick Stowers
- Story by: Jane Courthope; Ethel Hill
- Produced by: Ruth Roland
- Starring: Ruth Roland; Henry B. Walthall
- Cinematography: Allen Q. Thompson
- Production company: Co-Artists Productions
- Distributed by: Truart Film Corporation; State's Rights
- Release date: October 11, 1925
- Running time: 6 reels (6318 feet)
- Country: United States
- Language: Silent (English intertitles)

Dollar Down is a 1925 American silent drama film directed by Tod Browning. A print in the UCLA Film & Television Archive has one of its six reels missing. Filmed in April 1924 at the F.B.O Studios in Santa Monica, California, Dollar Down was the first of two features produced by star Ruth Roland and Browning's production company, Co-Artists Productions.

== Plot ==
As described in a film magazine reviews, Alec Craig has a fine position as general manager of a manufacturing firm, but his wife and daughter almost ruin him with their extravagance. They buy everything on the part payment plan, and their daughter Ruth pawns a ring that is not paid for to raise money with which to give an elaborate party. A man tricks her into disclosing the fact that her father’s company has an option on a valuable piece of land. Suspicion falls on Alec and he is about to lose his position. Ruth takes the blame, prevents the man from exercising the option, and a niece of Alec’s redeems the pawned ring.

== Cast ==
- Ruth Roland as Ruth Craig
- Henry B. Walthall as Alec Craig
- Mayme Kelso as Mrs. Craig
- Earl Schenck as Grant Elliot
- Claire McDowell as Mrs. Meadows (Craig's sister)
- Roscoe Karns as Gene Meadows (her son)
- Jane Mercer as Betty Meadows (her daughter)
- Lloyd Whitlock as Howard Steele
- Otis Harlan as Norris
- Edward W. Borman as Tilton (credited as Edward Borman)
- Newton Hall as Little Boy
- Pat Wing as Little Girl (credited as Madison Wing)
- Toby Wing as Little Girl
- Sonnie Walker as Little Boy
- Michael Dark (uncredited)
- Lou Marangella (uncredited)
