= Revenge (1918 film) =

1918 film

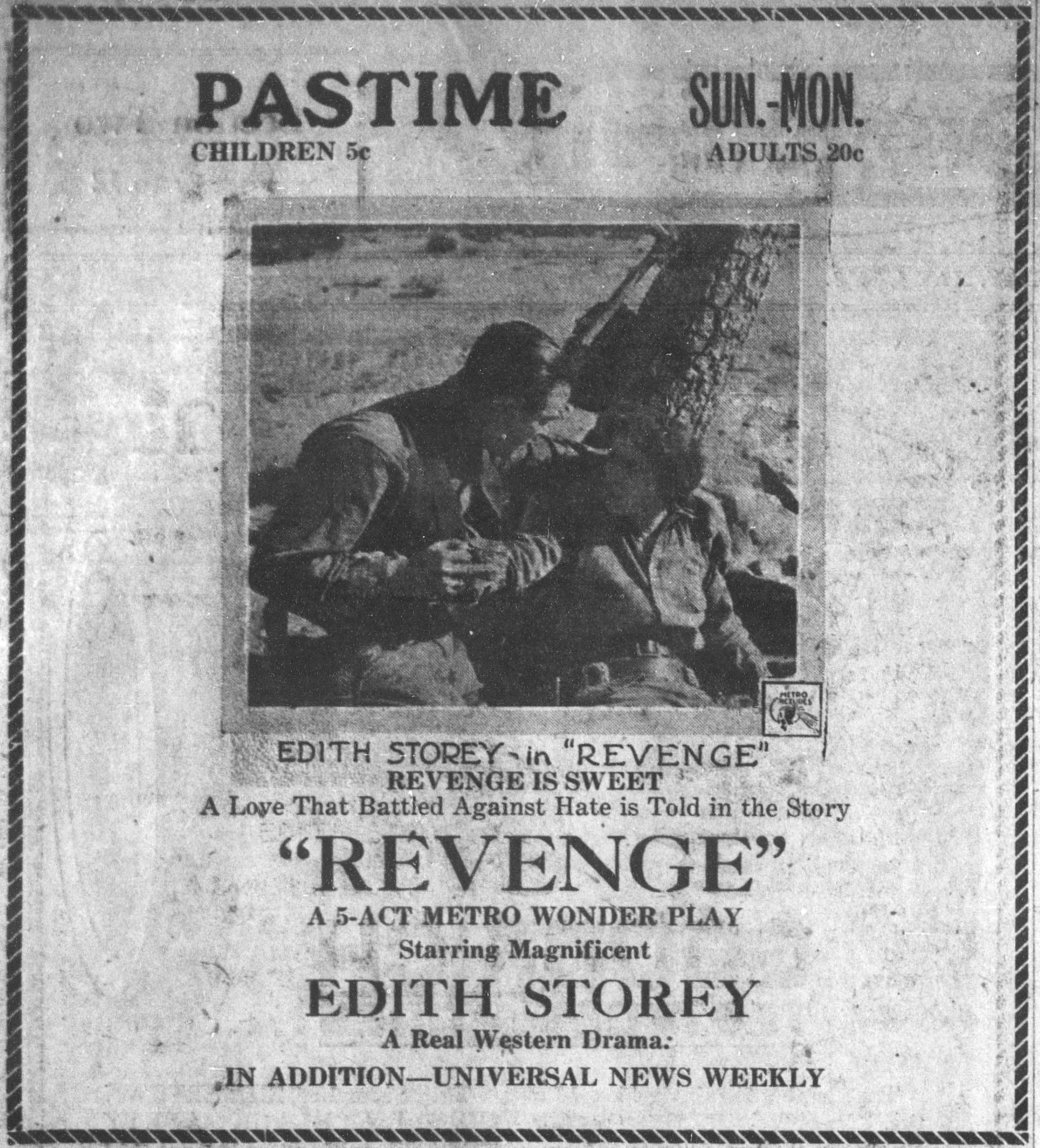
- Newspaper advertisement
- Directed by: Tod Browning
- Written by: Edward Moffat; H. P. Keeler; William Parker
- Produced by: B. A. Rolfe
- Starring: Edith Storey; Wheeler Oakman
- Cinematography: William C. Thompson
- Distributed by: Metro Pictures Corporation
- Release date: February 25, 1918
- Running time: 7 reels
- Country: United States
- Languages: Silent; English intertitles

Revenge is a 1918 American silent Western film directed by Tod Browning.

== Plot ==
As described in a film magazine, Alva Leigh, having been sent for by her fiancé, arrives in the west only to find him dead. She is determined to find his slayer and is assisted in her search by Dick Randall. Duncan, owner of a dance hall, is anxious to get Alva under his power and leads her to believe that Dick killed her sweetheart. Dick, in love with Alva, has prepared to cross the desert to record a deed to a mine that was owned by him and Alva's late sweetheart. In revenge, Alva cuts holes in Dick's canteens and allows the water to leak out. After Dick has been gone several hours, Alva learns that he is innocent, so she rushes out in the desert after him. After traveling several miles, she fall exhausted only to be rescued by Dick. He forgives her and they have a happy reunion.

== Cast ==
- Edith Storey as Alva Leigh
- Wheeler Oakman as Dick Randall
- Ralph Lewis as 'Sudden' Duncan
- Alberta Ballard as Tiger Lil
- Charles West as Donald Jaffray

== Reception ==
Like many American films of the time, Revenge was subject to cuts by city and state film censorship boards. For example, the Chicago Board of Censors required cuts of, in Reel 1, of a street scene showing drunken men and women, saloon scene showing woman sitting on table, Reel 2, two street scenes showing drunken couples, two closeups of Tiger Lil at bar, Reel 3, four views of women at bar, Reel 4, two tough dance scenes, three scenes of young woman at table with men in foreground, Reel 5, shooting scene, two scenes of tough dancing, Tiger Lil shooting Duncan, and all scenes of Duncan and Tiger Lil beginning where he throws her from him (this to eliminate all views of Tiger Lil and dead body scenes).
