= Set Free (1918 film) =

1918 film

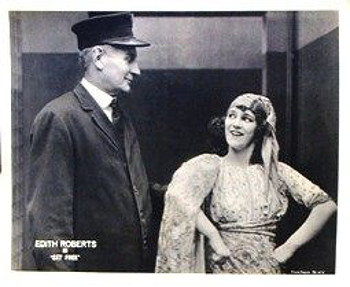
- Lobby card
- Directed by: Tod Browning
- Written by: Tod Browning; Joseph F. Poland; Rex Taylor
- Starring: Edith Roberts; Harry Hilliard
- Cinematography: Alfred Gosden
- Distributed by: Universal Film Manufacturing Company
- Release date: December 9, 1918
- Running time: 50 minutes
- Country: United States
- Language: Silent (English intertitles)

Set Free is a 1918 American silent comedy film directed by Tod Browning. It is not known whether the film currently survives, which suggests that it is a lost film.

== Plot ==
After discovering that her grandmother was a gypsy, Roma Wycliffe leaves her old- money life with her Aunt Henrietta, and goes to New York City to live as a gypsy.

Once she arrives in New York, Roma is mistaken for a thief and arrested. The kindly and rich woman Mrs. Roberts volunteers to take her under her wing to prevent her from going to jail. Her son John Roberts falls in love with Roma. Roma does not return his feelings, because his rich life style is a far cry from the freedom of gypsy life. John hires a group of street thugs to pretend to be his gypsy crew. The “gypsies” take their new role as gypsy thieves too far and start robbing a bank. John turns them in to the authorities. John and Roma agree to marry.

== Cast ==
- Edith Roberts as Roma Wycliffe
- Harry Hilliard as John Roberts
- Harold Goodwin as Ronald Blair
- Mollie McConnell as Mrs. Roberts (credited as Molly McConnell)
