= Peggy, the Will O' the Wisp =

1917 film

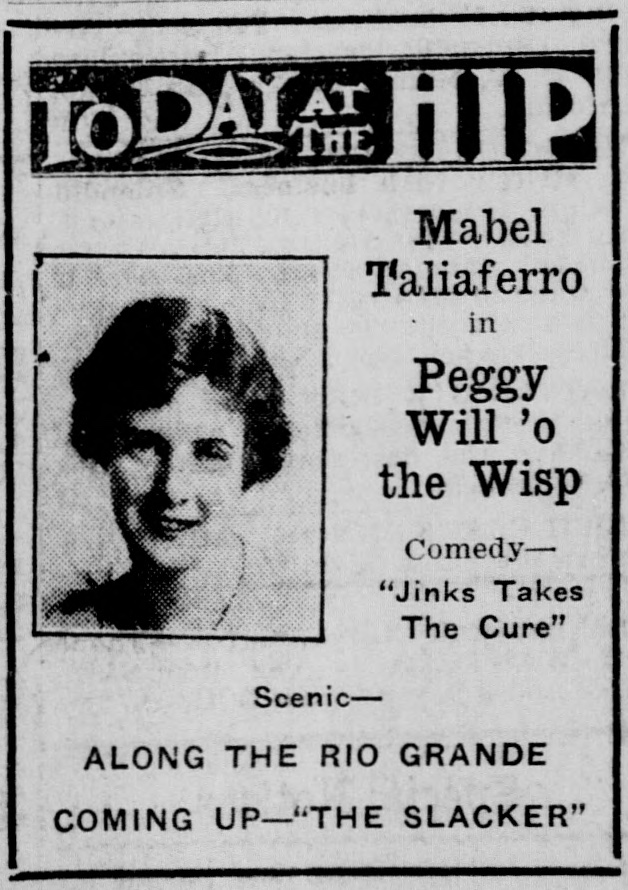
- Newspaper advertisement
- Directed by: Tod Browning
- Written by: Katharine Kavanaugh
- Produced by: B. A. Rolfe
- Starring: Mabel Taliaferro; Thomas Carrigan
- Cinematography: John M. Bauman
- Edited by: Ben Weiss
- Distributed by: Metro Pictures
- Release date: July 2, 1917
- Country: United States
- Language: Silent (English intertitles)

Peggy, the Will O' the Wisp is a lost 1917 American drama film directed by Tod Browning.

== Plot ==
As described in a film magazine review, Neil Dacey loves Peggy Desmond. Terence O'Malley, nephew of Squire O'Malley, is anxious to win Peggy. Terence and his uncle have a quarrel because Terence cannot win Peggy, and the squire is killed. Terence does the killing with Neil's gun, so Neil is held for the murder. Peggy, to save her fiance, dresses as the will-o'-the-wisp, and this results in a confession by Terence.

== Cast ==
- Mabel Taliaferro as Peggy Desmond
- Thomas Carrigan as Captain Neil Dacey (as Thomas J. Carrigan)
- William J. Gross as Anthony Desmond (as W.J. Gross)
- Sam Ryan as Squire O'Malley (as Sam J. Ryan)
- Nathaniel Sack as Terence O'Malley (as Nathan Sack)
- Thomas O'Malley as Shamus Donnelly (as Thomas F. O'Malley)
- Florence Ashbrooke as Sarah
- Clara Blandick as Mrs. Donnelly
- John J. Williams as Muldoon (as J.J. Williams)
