= The Mystic =

1925 film

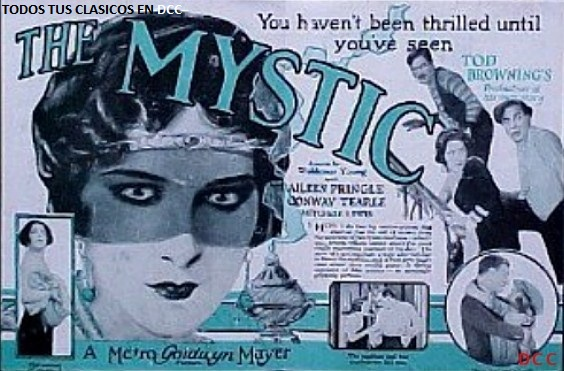
- Lobby card
- Directed by: Tod Browning
- Written by: Tod Browning; Waldemar Young
- Produced by: Louis B. Mayer; Irving Thalberg
- Starring: Aileen Pringle; Conway Tearle
- Cinematography: Ira H. Morgan
- Edited by: Frank Sullivan
- Distributed by: Metro-Goldwyn-Mayer
- Release date: September 27, 1925
- Running time: 70 minutes
- Country: United States
- Language: Silent with English intertitles

The Mystic is a 1925 American MGM silent drama film directed by Tod Browning, who also co-wrote it with Waldemar Young. It is the only one of nine silent MGM films directed by Browning from 1925 to 1929 that does not star Lon Chaney. The film costars Aileen Pringle and Conway Tearle. Aileen Pringle's gowns in the film were by already famous Romain de Tirtoff (known as Erté). A print of the film exists.

== Plot ==
The film opens with a teasing intertitle: "Any seventh daughter of a seventh daughter (playing on the phrase "seventh son of a seventh son") can answer this question", followed by a shot of a sign reading "VISSZAJONNEK-E A HELOTTAK?" (Hungarian for "Will the dead come back?" The sign turns out to be advertising a "gypsy" sideshow run by Poppa Zazarack at a carnival in Hungary featuring his knife-throwing assistant Anton and his daughter Zara. Anton notices that their act is being followed and observed by a well-dressed stranger whom Anton believes is especially interested in Zara, though she does not seem to mind. As the group perform their "magic" act, the stranger continues to watch and enjoy. That night as the carnival begins to leave town, the stranger, Michael Nash, enters the team's wagon and offers them money to participate in a scheme that will make them rich if they come with him to America.

Soon, a New York newspaper headline announces the arrival of "Zara, famous Hungarian mystic," and Zara becomes the center of attention at a gathering of wealthy socialites arranged by Nash and hosted by Zazarack. As Nash and Anton work behind the scenes to manage "mystic" effects, a worried Zazarack informs them that the chief of police is attending the show that is about to start. Nash tells him that they must go ahead and the "séance" starts. Despite the policeman's efforts to debunk the show, it is a success and Nash declares his love for Zara, to Anton's jealous consternation.

Nash now sets his sights on Doris Merrick, a young heiress still under the protection of businessman James Bradshaw, who is in danger of going bankrupt. Quietly urged on by Nash, both Doris and Bradshaw become interested in Zara's supposed talents. While Nash develops his plot, the police inspector wants to find out who is masterminding Zara's seances. Meanwhile Anton grows increasingly impatient, but Nash tells him to find all the information he can about Doris's deceased father, hoping to blackmail Bradshaw for using Doris's money for his own purposes. Anton and Zazarack are alarmed at being implicated in the more serious crime, but Zara insists that they stand by Nash.

Having arranged a private seance, Bradshaw is warned by the apparent spirit of Doris's father not to betray her trust in him. Doris, described by Nash as a "baby lamb" about to be sacrificed, arrives soon after for her own private session. Returning to Bradshaw, Doris reveals that her father's "spirit" has told her to demand control of all her own money and not to remain in Bradshaw's house. Bradshaw is visited by the police inspector who tells him to return Doris's possessions to her in order to set a trap for Nash.

A bit later, Nash visits Doris in her new apartment, planning to take control of her money, stocks, and jewelry. Distressed by seeing a locket with pictures of her parents, Doris suddenly claims to see the spirit of her father in the room even though no one else is there and that he was happy for her being befriended by Nash and Zara. Doris leaves the room, but when Zara arrives, the guilt-ridden Nash tells her that he won't go through with his plan. She is angered at this turn of events, as are Anton and Zazarack soon after.

Doris then tells Bradshaw that Zara has invited her to come live with her new "friends," and Bradshaw informs the police. Zara then turns Doris's valuables over to Anton and Zazarack only to seize them again when Nash returns. Zara and Nash confront each other, with Nash declaring that they love each other and that she must believe in his change of heart without proof, finally changing her own heart. The two are then confronted by Anton and Zazarack, while the police, who have been waiting outside, raid the house.

At the last minute, Nash seizes the valuables and escapes. His three accomplices are declared to have merely been his dupes and are deported back to Hungary. Nash, meanwhile, returns the valuables to Doris's room while she sleeps, along with a note explaining that he had acted in order that any guilt would fall only on him. Later, by a gypsy campfire in Hungary, Zara is surprised to see Nash approach and the two lovers are finally reunited.

== Cast ==
- Aileen Pringle as Zara
- Conway Tearle as Michael Nash
- Mitchell Lewis as Zazarack
- Robert Ober as Anton
- Stanton Heck as Carlo
- David Torrence as Bradshaw
- Gladys Hulette as Doris Merrick
- DeWitt Jennings as Police Inspector
- Carrie Daumery as Woman at Seance
- Joseph Hazelton as Sideshow spectator

== Home media ==
After years of being a VHS exclusive, The Criterion Collection announced a Blu-Ray set that also includes Freaks and The Unknown released on October 17, 2023. On this release, the film has a new score composed by Dean Hurley.

== Bibliography ==
- Eaker, Alfred. 2016. Tod Browning Retrospective. Retrieved 26 February 2021.
