= The Exquisite Thief =

1919 film

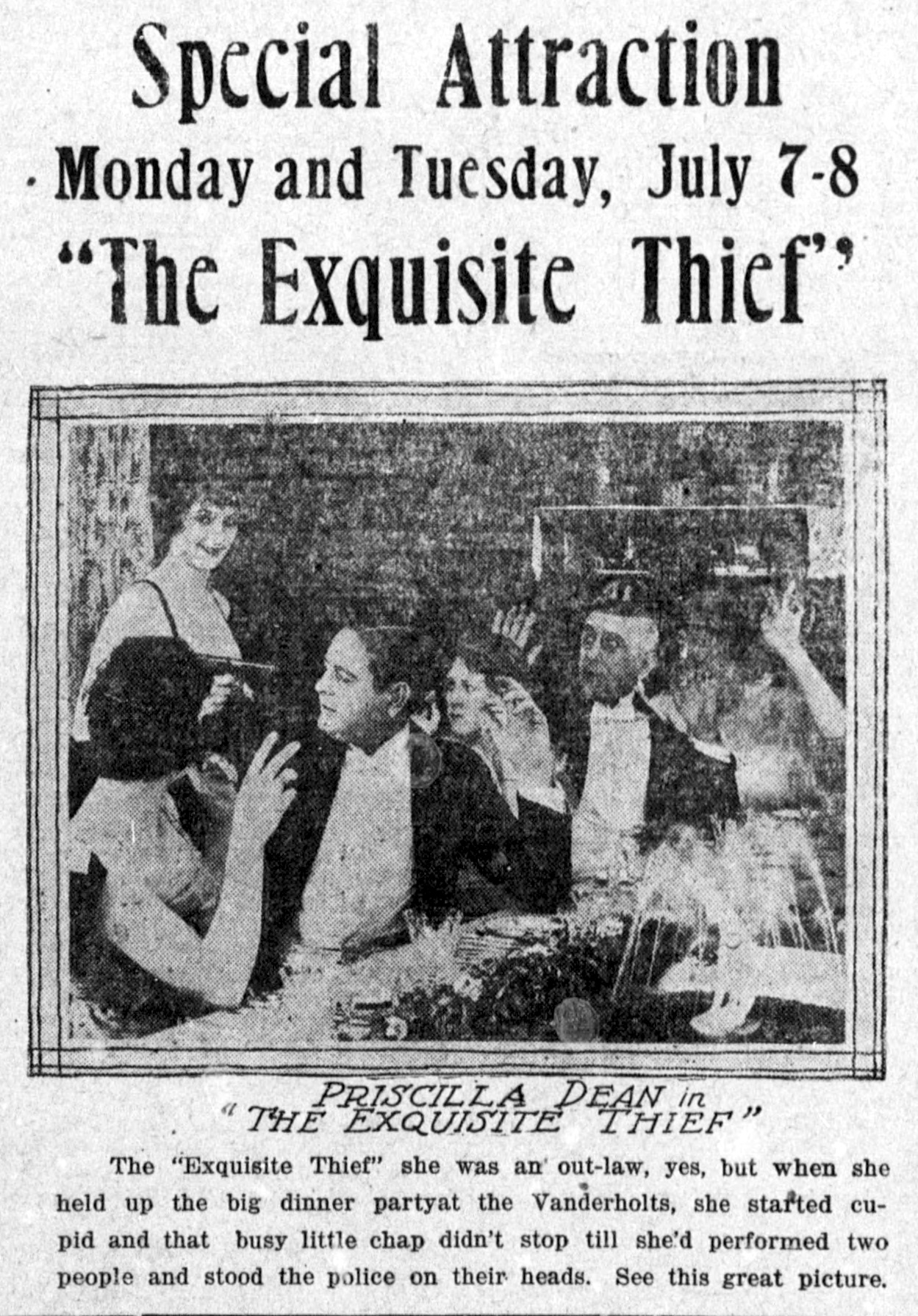
- Newspaper advertisement
- Directed by: Tod Browning
- Written by: Charles W. Tyler (story: "Raggedy Ann"); Harvey Gates
- Starring: Priscilla Dean; Thurston Hall
- Cinematography: Alfred Gosden
- Distributed by: Universal Film Manufacturing Company
- Release date: April 28, 1919
- Running time: 6 reels
- Country: United States
- Language: Silent (English intertitles)

The Exquisite Thief is a 1919 American silent drama film directed by Tod Browning. Prints and/or fragments were found in the Dawson Film Find in 1978.

== Plot ==
Surviving footage from The Exquisite Thief

As described in a film magazine, Blue Jean Billie, a prosperous young woman crook who lives apart from the denizens of the underworld, has pulled off many robberies of the high society world with the help of her pal Shaver Michael. Billie gains admission to the Vanderhoof dinner at which the engagement of their daughter to Lord Chesterton will be announced. While the dinner is in progress, Billie gags and handcuffs special officer Detective Wood, and proceeds to make a wholesale robbery of the guests. She flees in an automobile and none succeed in tracking her save Lord Chesterton. She makes a prisoner of him, but a police raid follows and she must flee. Once more Lord Chesterton succeeds in following her and again she makes him her prisoner, but she learns to trust and love him. The special agent and Shaver Michael arrive at the scene with resulting complications, but a happy end results for all.

== Cast ==
- Priscilla Dean as Blue Jean Billie
- Thurston Hall as Algernon P. Smythe (Lord Chesterton)
- Milton Ross as Det. Wood
- Sam De Grasse as Shaver Michael
- Jean Calhoun as Muriel Vanderflip
