= List of Metro Pictures films =

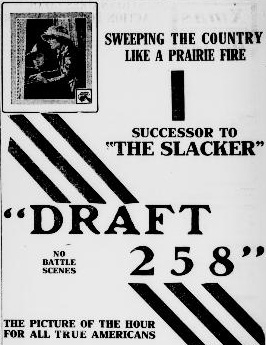
Newspaper advertisement for 'Draft 258

Metro Pictures Corporation was a motion picture production company founded in 1915 in the United States. It was, along with Goldwyn Pictures and Louis B. Mayer Pictures Corporation, one of the forerunners of Metro-Goldwyn-Mayer. The company produced its films in New York, Los Angeles, and sometimes at leased facilities in Fort Lee, New Jersey. Metro Pictures was founded as a film distribution company in February 1915 by a number of "exchange men" with Richard A. Rowland as president, George Grombacher as vice-president and Louis B. Mayer as secretary. It soon also began producing its own films, with Sealed Valley being Metro's first production, which was released on August 2, 1915.

Metro's list of stars during its existence included Mae Murray, Viola Dana, Lionel and Ethel Barrymore, Emmy Wehlen, Emily Stevens, Lillian Gish, Buster Keaton, Jackie Coogan, Marion Davies, Ramon Novarro, Wallace Beery and Lewis Stone. The romantic teams of Francis X. Bushman and Beverly Bayne and Harold Lockwood and May Allison also worked for Metro.

In 1919, the company was purchased by Marcus Loew as a supplier of product for his theater chain. Several years later, in 1924, Loew merged it with his recently acquired Goldwyn Pictures, followed shortly thereafter with another merge with Louis B. Mayer Productions. The resulting entity was named Metro-Goldwyn-Mayer in 1925 with Mayer in charge.

== Key ==
#	Considered to be lost.

== 1910s ==
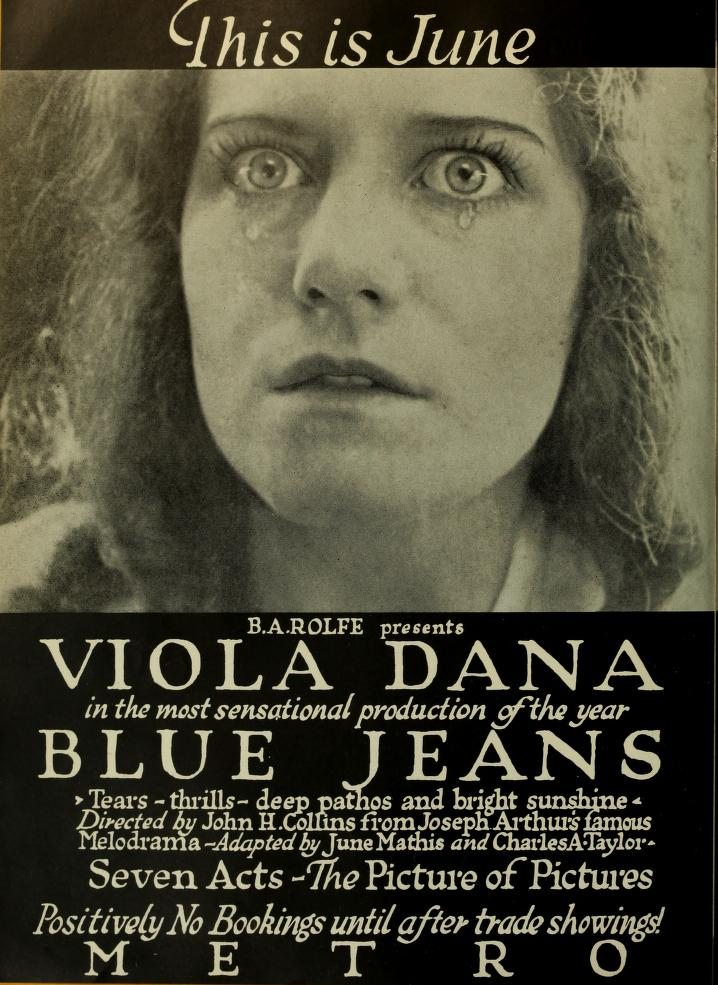
Poster for Blue Jeans

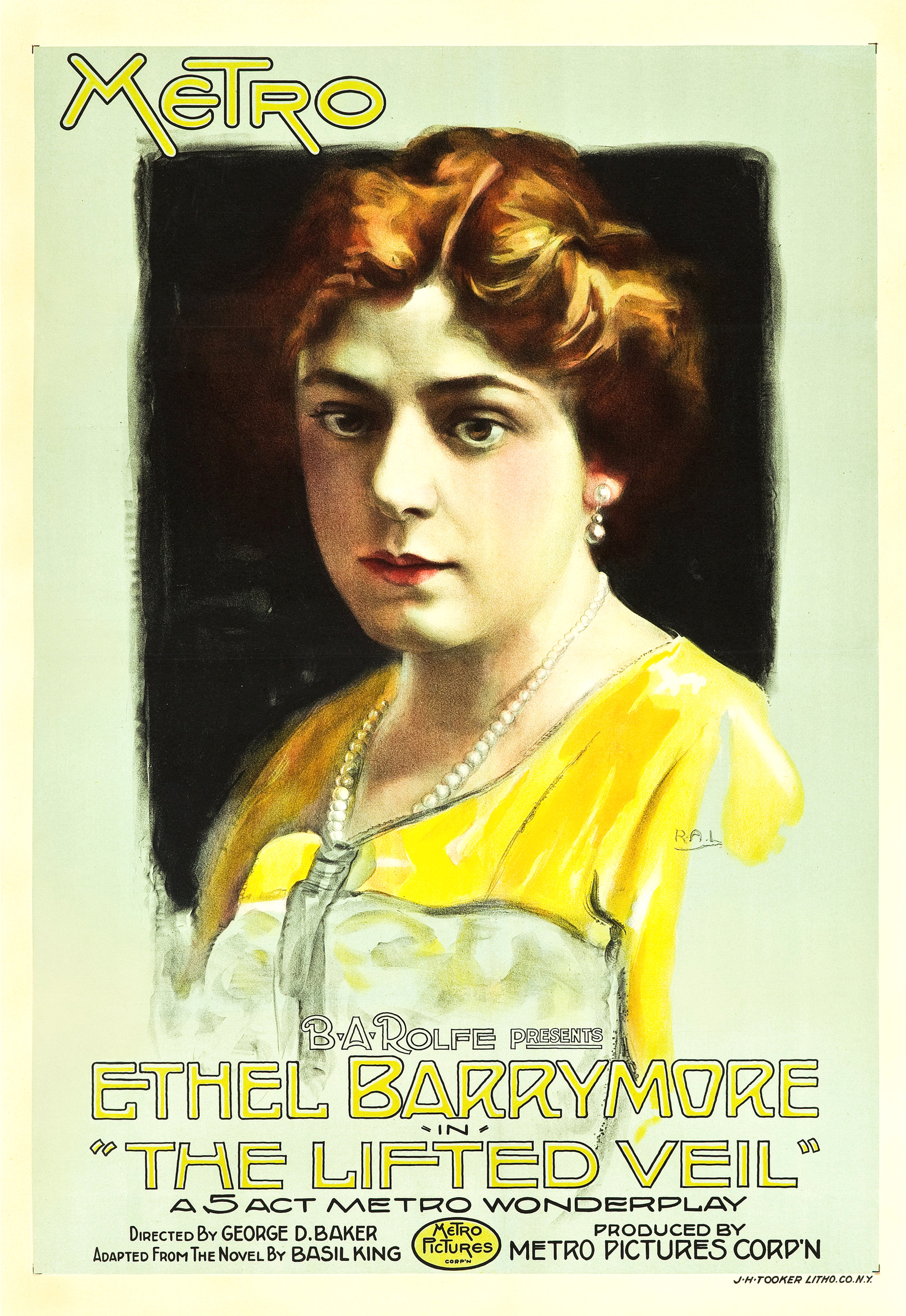
Poster for The Lifted Veil

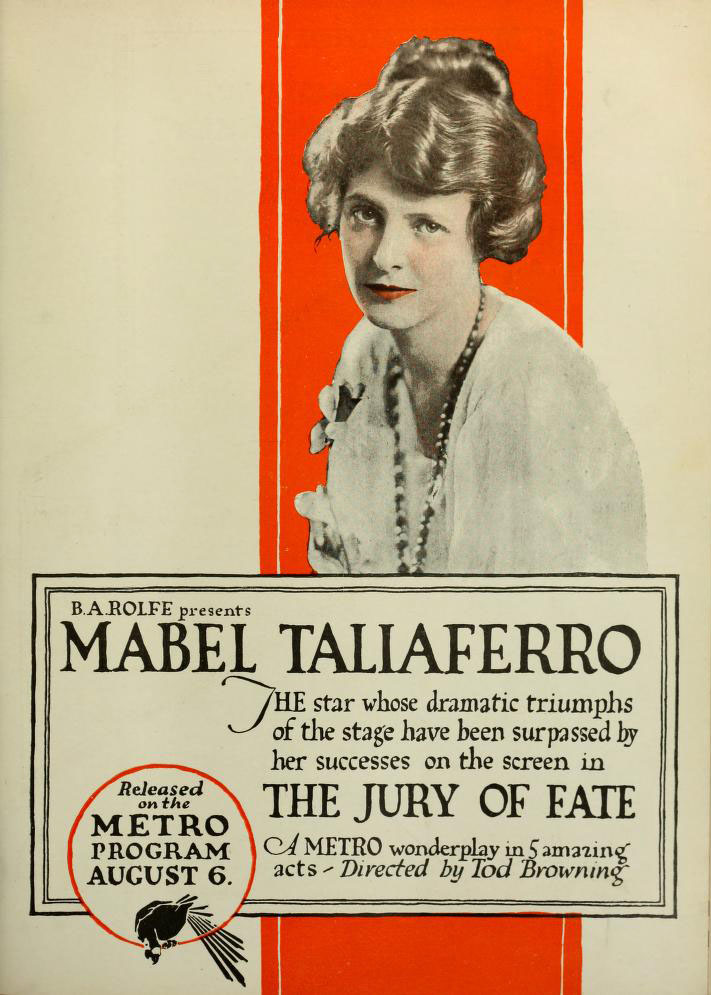
Poster for The Jury of Fate

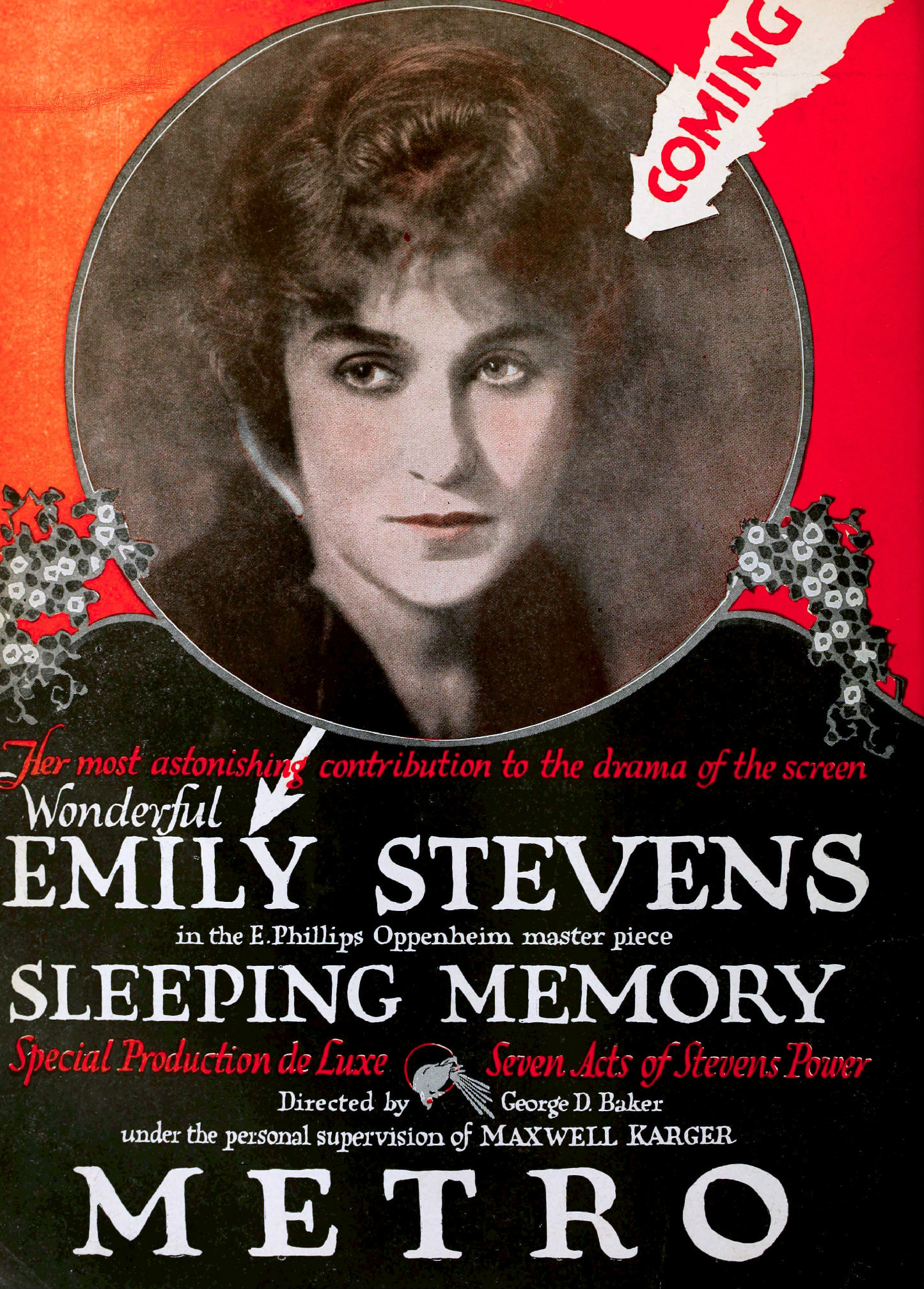
Advertisement for A Sleeping Memory

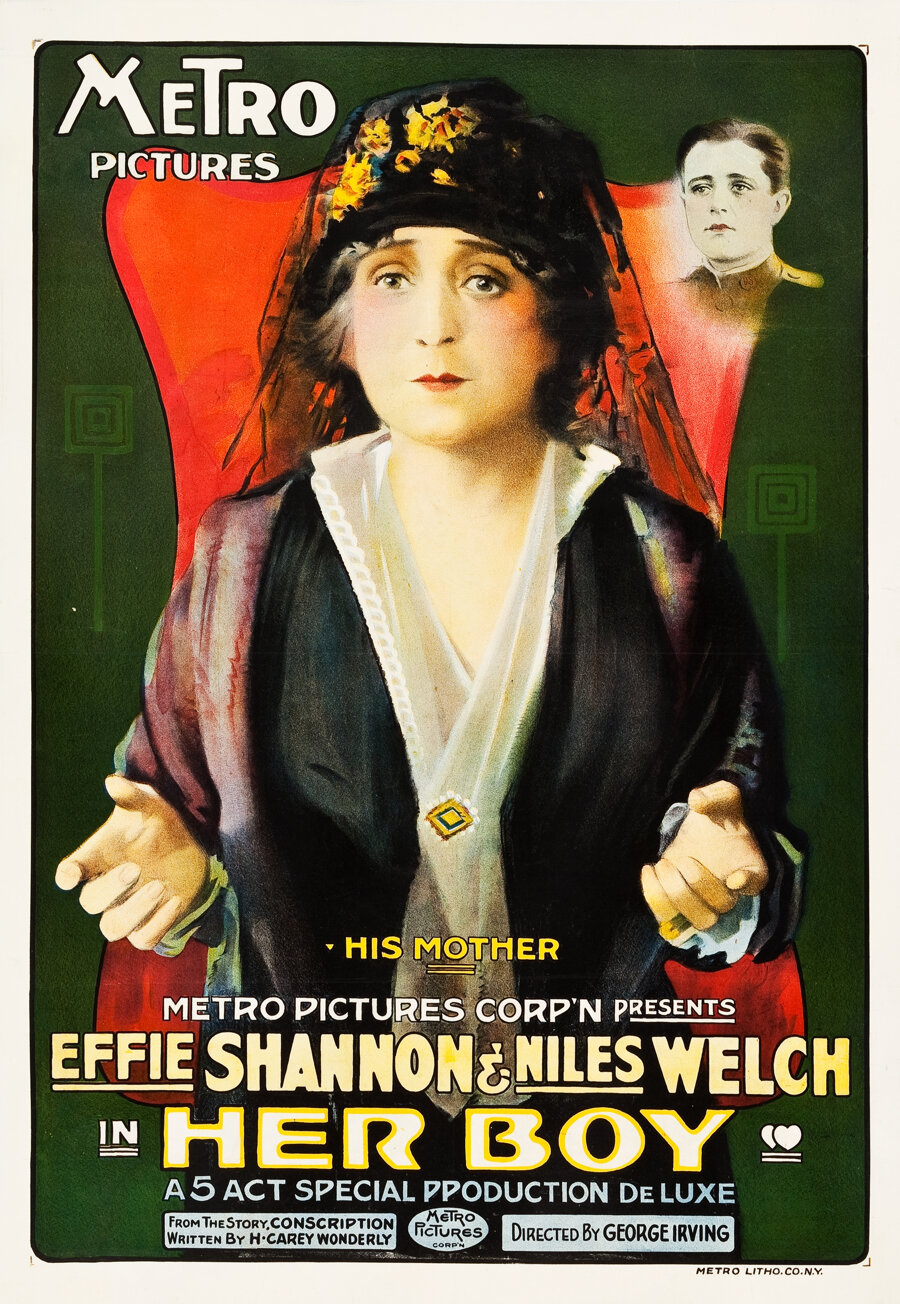
Poster for Her Boy

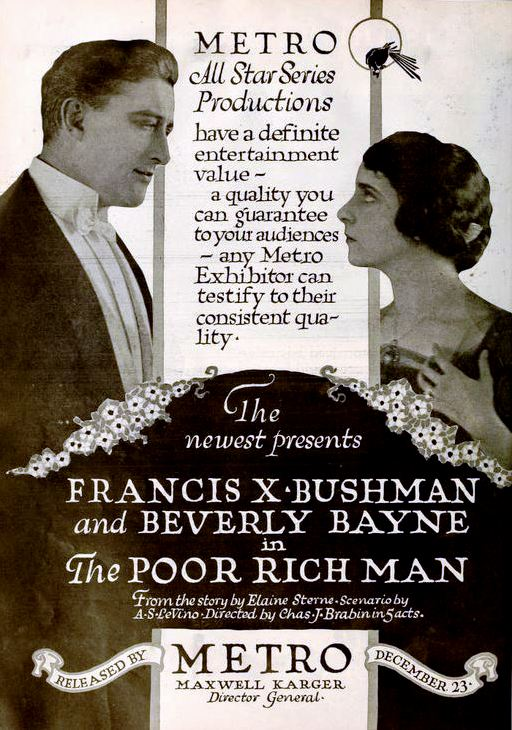
Advertisement for The Poor Rich Man

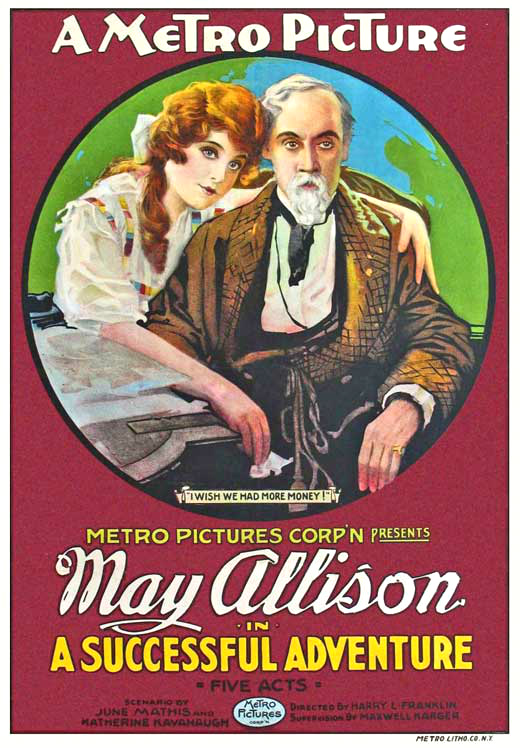
Lobby poster for A Successful Adventure

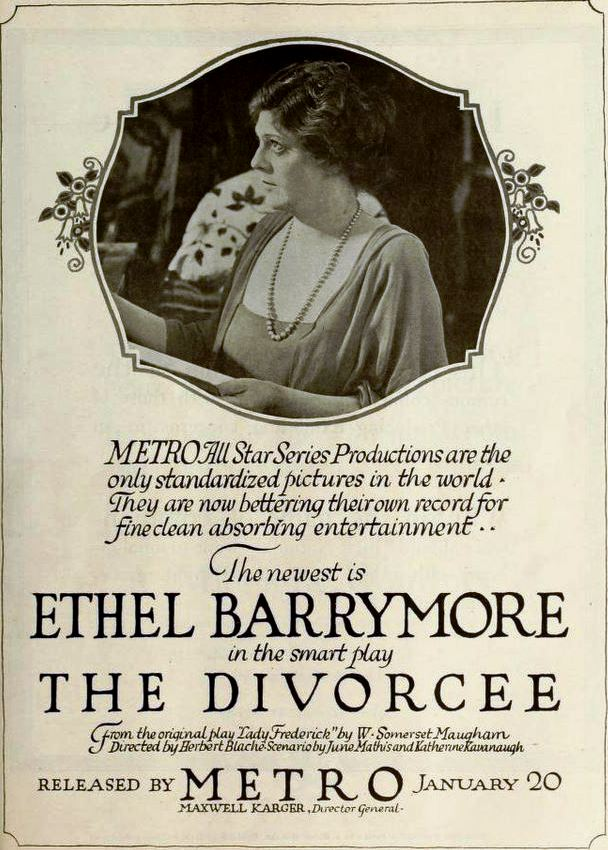
Advertisement for The Divorcee

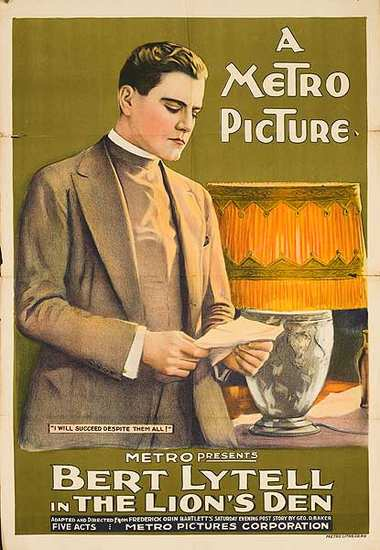
Poster for The Lion's Den

Release date	Film	Status/References
March 20, 1915	The Heart of Maryland	Distribution.
March 29, 1915	Satan Sanderson	Distribution.
April 12, 1915	The Cowboy and the Lady	Distribution.
April 19, 1915	The Heart of a Painted Woman	Distribution.
April 26, 1915	The High Road	Distribution.
May 2, 1915	The Shooting of Dan McGrew	Distribution.
May 9, 1915	Cora	Distribution.
May 24, 1915	Four Feathers	Distribution.
May 31, 1915	Her Own Way	Distribution.
June 7, 1915	Fighting Bob	Distribution.
June 14, 1915	My Best Girl	Distribution.
June 21, 1915	Always in the Way	Distribution.
June 28, 1915	The Flaming Sword	Distribution.
July 5, 1915	Greater Love Hath No Man	Distribution.
July 12, 1915	Marse Covington	Distribution.
July 19, 1915	The Right of Way	Distribution.
July 26, 1915	The Second in Command	Distribution.
August 2, 1915	Sealed Valley	First film produced by Metro
August 9, 1915	The Vampire	Distribution.
August 16, 1915	A Royal Family	Distribution.
August 30, 1915	Her Great Match	
September 6, 1915	Destiny	incomplete, 3 reels out of 5
September 13, 1915	The Silent Voice	
September 15, 1915	An Enemy to Society	
September 20, 1915	The Bigger Man	
October 4, 1915	The Song of the Wage Slave	
October 11, 1915	Emmy of Stork's Nest	
October 18, 1915	The Final Judgment	
October 25, 1915	My Madonna	
November 1, 1915	Her Reckoning	
November 8, 1915	Pennington's Choice	
November 15, 1915	The Woman Pays	
November 22, 1915	One Million Dollars	
November 28, 1915	Barbara Frietchie	
December 6, 1915	A Yellow Streak	
December 13, 1915	The House of Tears	
December 20, 1915	Rosemary	
December 28, 1915	Black Fear	
January 3, 1916	What Will People Say?	
January 10, 1916	The Turmoil	
January 17, 1916	Rose of the Alley	
January 17, 1916	The Lure of Heart's Desire	
January 24, 1916	Her Debt of Honor	
January 31, 1916	Man and His Soul	
February 7, 1916	The Upstart	
February 13, 1916	Dimples	
February 21, 1916	The Price of Malice	
February 21, 1916	A Corner in Cotton	
February 21, 1916	The Red Mouse	
March 6, 1916	The Blindness of Love	
March 12, 1916	The Soul Market	
March 13, 1916	Lovely Mary	
March 20, 1916	The Wall Between	incomplete, one reel missing
March 27, 1916	Her Great Price	
April 3, 1916	The Kiss of Hate	
April 10, 1916	The Half Million Bribe	incomplete
April 16, 1916	Vanity	
April 17, 1916	Playing with Fire	
April 24, 1916	The Come-Back	
May 1, 1916	The Snowbird	
May 8, 1916	A Million a Minute	
May 15, 1916	The Spell of the Yukon	
May 22, 1916	Notorious Gallagher	
May 29, 1916	The Scarlet Woman	
June 5, 1916	Dorian's Divorce	
June 12, 1916	The Masked Rider	
June 26, 1916	The Flower of No Man's Land	
June 26, 1916	The Purple Lady	
July 3, 1916	The Eternal Question	
July 10, 1916	The Quitter	
July 17, 1916	The River of Romance	
July 24, 1916	The Child of Destiny	
July 31, 1916	The Devil at His Elbow	
August 1, 1916	God's Half Acre	
August 20, 1916	The Weakness of Strength	
August 21, 1916	The Pretenders	
August 28, 1916	The Upheaval	
September 4, 1916	The Light of Happiness	
September 11, 1916	Mister 44	
September 18, 1916	The Wheel of the Law	
September 25, 1916	The Dawn of Love	
October 2, 1916	The Iron Woman	
October 9, 1916	Life's Shadows	
October 16, 1916	In the Diplomatic Service	
October 19, 1916	Romeo and Juliet	
October 23, 1916	The Brand of Cowardice	
October 30, 1916	The Gates of Eden	
November 6, 1916	Extravagance	
November 13, 1916	The Wager	
November 20, 1916	Big Tremaine	
November 27, 1916	The Sunbeam	
December 4, 1916	The Black Butterfly	
December 11, 1916	The Stolen Triumph	
December 18, 1916	The Awakening of Helena Richie	
December 25, 1916	Pidgin Island	
January 6, 1917	A Wife by Proxy	
January 14, 1917	The White Raven	
January 22, 1917	Threads of Fate	Fragment
January 29, 1917	The End of the Tour	
February 5, 1917	Bridges Burned	
February 12, 1917	One of Many	
February 12, 1917	The Promise	
February 26, 1917	The Secret of Eve	
March 5, 1917	The Barricade	
March 12, 1917	The Mortal Sin	
March 19, 1917	His Father's Son	
March 26, 1917	The Hidden Children	
April 2, 1917	The Waiting Soul	
April 9, 1917	The Power of Decision	
April 18, 1917	A Magdalene of the Hills	
April 23, 1917	God's Law and Man's	
April 29, 1917	The Millionaire's Double	
May 7, 1917	Sowers and Reapers	
May 14, 1917	The Soul of a Magdalen	
May 21, 1917	The Beautiful Lie	
May 27, 1917	The Call of Her People	
May 28, 1917	The Duchess of Doubt	
June 4, 1917	Lady Barnacle	
June 11, 1917	The Haunted Pajamas	
June 25, 1917	Aladdin's Other Lamp	
July 2, 1917	Peggy, the Will O' the Wisp	
July 9, 1917	The Trail of the Shadow	
July 16, 1917	The Hidden Spring	
July 16, 1917	The Slacker	
July 30, 1917	Miss Robinson Crusoe	
August 6, 1917	The Jury of Fate	
August 13, 1917	The Girl Without a Soul	Inducted into the National Film Registry in 2018
August 27, 1917	To the Death	
September 3, 1917	Under Handicap	
September 10, 1917	The Lifted Veil	
September 17, 1917	Their Compact	
September 24, 1917	The Silence Sellers	
October 1, 1917	Paradise Garden	
October 15, 1917	A Sleeping Memory	
October 22, 1917	More Truth Than Poetry	
October 29, 1917	The Adopted Son	
November 5, 1917	The Outsider	
November 8, 1917	Life's Whirlpool	
November 12, 1917	Outwitted	
November 15, 1917	Draft 258	
November 19, 1917	The Voice of Conscience	
November 26, 1917	The Eternal Mother	
December 3, 1917	The Square Deceiver	
December 10, 1917	Blue Jeans	
December 10, 1917	Alias Mrs. Jessop	
December 10, 1917	The Greatest Power	
December 17, 1917	An American Widow	
December 24, 1917	Red, White and Blue Blood	
December 31, 1917	The Avenging Trail	
January 7, 1918	Daybreak	
January 14, 1918	The Winding Trail	
January 21, 1918	The Eyes of Mystery	
January 27, 1918	Lest We Forget	
January 1918	The Legion of Death	
January 28, 1918	Her Boy	
February 4, 1918	Under Suspicion	
February 11, 1918	Broadway Bill	
February 17, 1918	Revelation	
February 18, 1918	A Weaver of Dreams	
February 25, 1918	Revenge	
March 4, 1918	The Shell Game	
March 11, 1918	The Brass Check	
March 18, 1918	The Claim	
March 25, 1918	Breakers Ahead	
April 1, 1918	The Landloper	
April 6, 1918	Social Hypocrites	
April 7, 1918	My Own United States	
April 15, 1918	With Neatness and Dispatch	
April 22, 1918	Treasure of the Sea	
April 29, 1918	Riders of the Night	
May 6, 1918	The Trail to Yesterday	Fragment
May 12, 1918	Toys of Fate	
May 13, 1918	Cyclone Higgins, D.D.	
May 20, 1918	The Winning of Beatrice	
May 25, 1918	The Million Dollar Dollies	
May 27, 1918	Lend Me Your Name	
June 3, 1918	To Hell with the Kaiser!	
June 10, 1918	Social Quicksands	
June 17, 1918	The House of Gold	
June 24, 1918	A Man's World	
June 24, 1918	The Only Road	
July 1, 1918	Opportunity	
July 8, 1918	No Man's Land	
July 15, 1918	A Successful Adventure	
July 22, 1918	The Demon	
July 29, 1918	A Pair of Cupids	
August 5, 1918	The House of Mirth	
August 12, 1918	Flower of the Dusk	
August 12, 1918	In Judgement Of	Incomplete
August 26, 1918	Boston Blackie's Little Pal	
September 2, 1918	The Silent Woman	
September 9, 1918	Our Mrs. McChesney	
September 16, 1918	Kildare of Storm	
September 23, 1918	The Return of Mary	
September 24, 1918	Pals First	
September 30, 1918	Unexpected Places	
October 7, 1918	Secret Strings	
October 14, 1918	His Bonded Wife	
November 25, 1918	Five Thousand an Hour	
December 2, 1918	The Testing of Mildred Vane	
December 9, 1918	Hitting the High Spots	
December 16, 1918	Sylvia on a Spree	
December 22, 1918	Eye for Eye	
December 23, 1918	The Poor Rich Man	
December 30, 1918	Her Inspiration	
January 1, 1919	The Great Victory	
January 6, 1919	The Spender	
January 6, 1919	The Gold Cure	
January 19, 1919	The Great Romance	
January 20, 1919	The Divorcee	
January 27, 1919	In for Thirty Days	
February 3, 1919	Faith	
February 8, 1919	Out of the Fog	
February 10, 1919	As the Sun Went Down	
February 17, 1919	Johnny-on-the-Spot	
February 23, 1919	Shadows of Suspicion	
February 24, 1919	Peggy Does Her Darndest	
March 3, 1919	Satan Junior	incomplete, one reel missing
March 10, 1919	Blind Man's Eyes	
March 17, 1919	The Way of the Strong	
March 24, 1919	That's Good	
March 31, 1919	The Parisian Tigress	
April 1, 1919	A Man of Honor	
April 7, 1919	The Island of Intrigue	
April 14, 1919	Blackie's Redemption	
April 21, 1919	False Evidence	
April 28, 1919	The Amateur Adventuress	May have been released on May 5, 1919.
April 28, 1919	After His Own Heart	
May 4, 1919	The Red Lantern	
May 12, 1919	Castles in the Air	
May 19, 1919	The Lion's Den	
May 26, 1919	Full of Pep	
June 2, 1919	Almost Married	
June 9, 1919	Some Bride	
June 16, 1919	Fools and Their Money	
June 23, 1919	One-Thing-at-a-Time O'Day	
June 30, 1919	The Uplifters	
July 6, 1919	The Man Who Stayed at Home	
July 7, 1919	God's Outlaw	
July 14, 1919	In His Brother's Place	
July 21, 1919	The Microbe	
July 28, 1919	The Belle of the Season	
August 4, 1919	Easy To Make Money	
August 18, 1919	A Favor to a Friend	
August 18, 1919	The Four Flusher	
September 1, 1919	The Brat	
October 1, 1919	Lombardi, Ltd.	
October 25, 1919	Please Get Married	
November 1, 1919	Fair and Warmer	
December 28, 1919	Should a Woman Tell?	

== 1920s ==
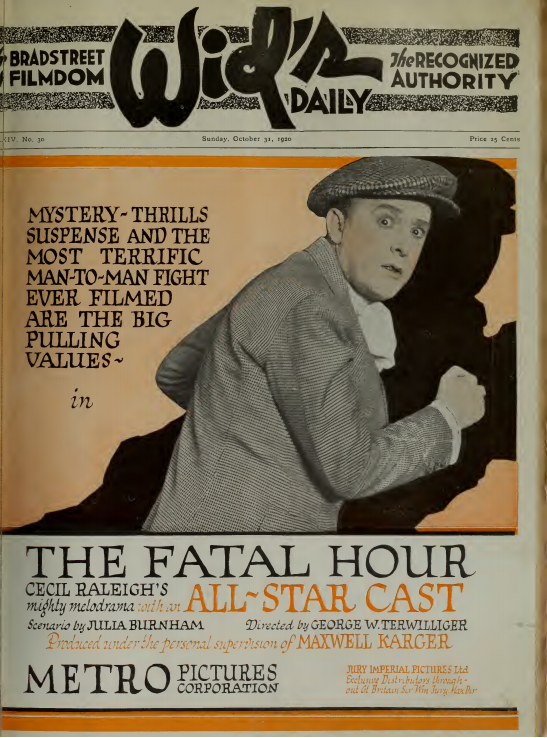
Advertisement for The Fatal Hour

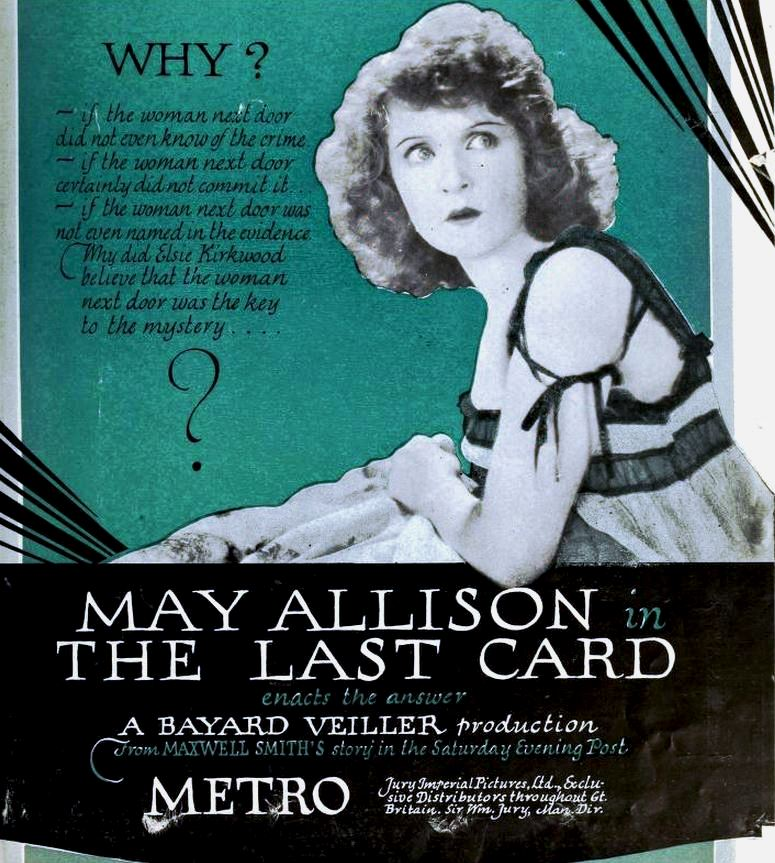
Advertisement for The Last Card

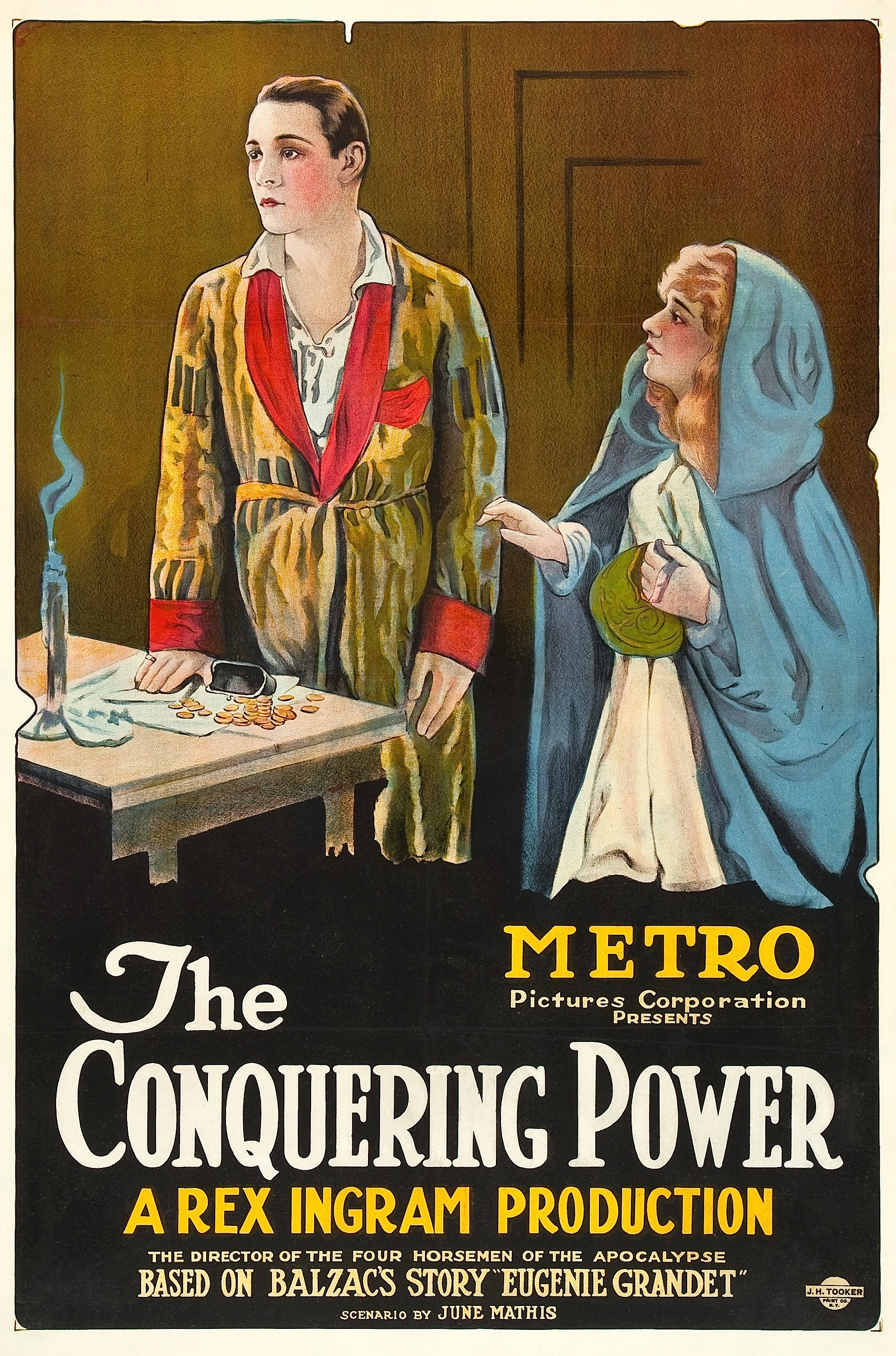
Poster for The Conquering Power

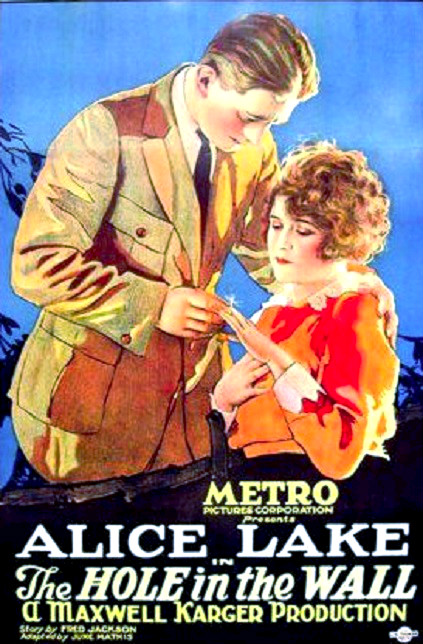
Poster for The Hole in the Wall

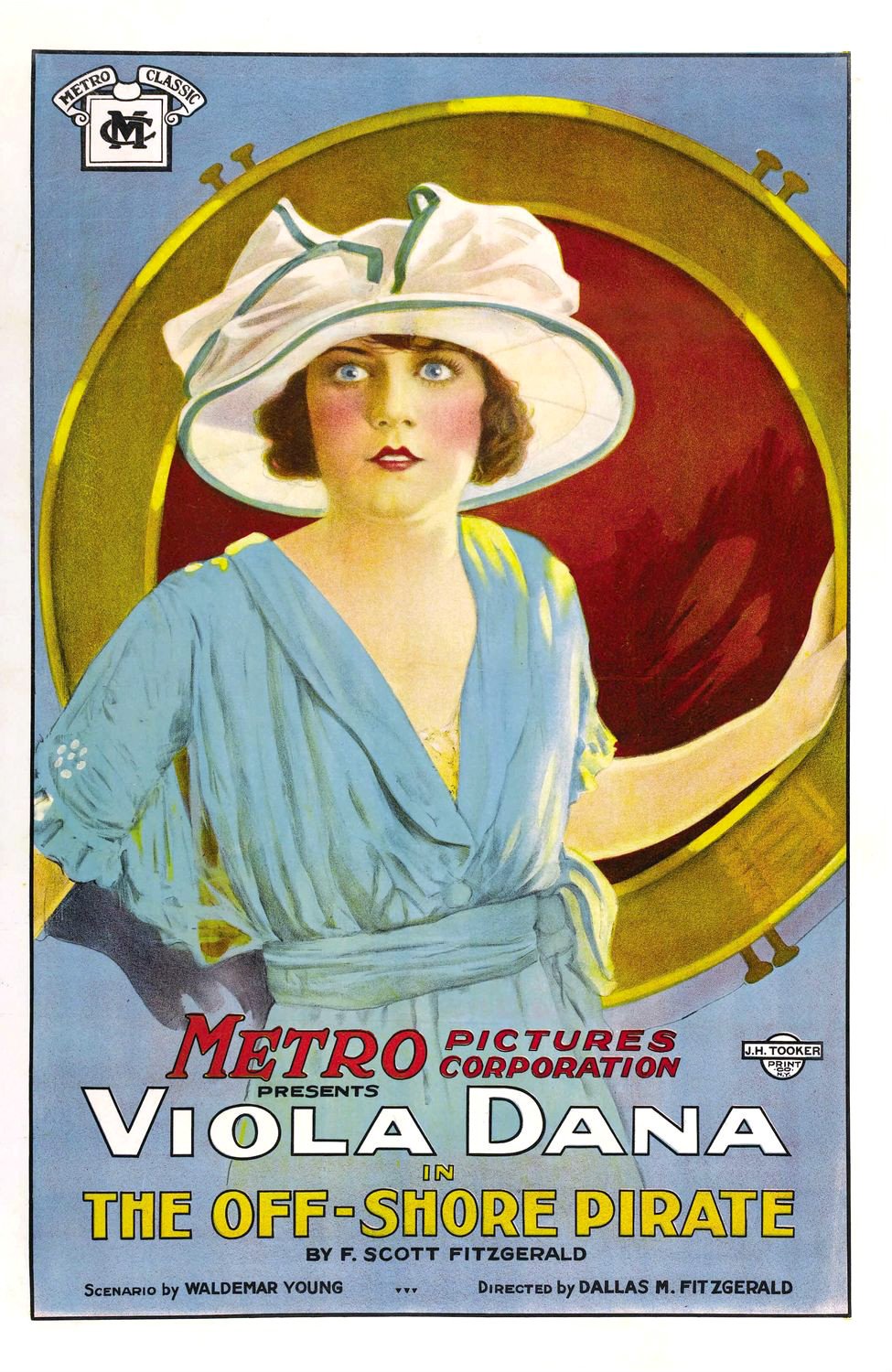
Poster for The Off-Shore Pirate

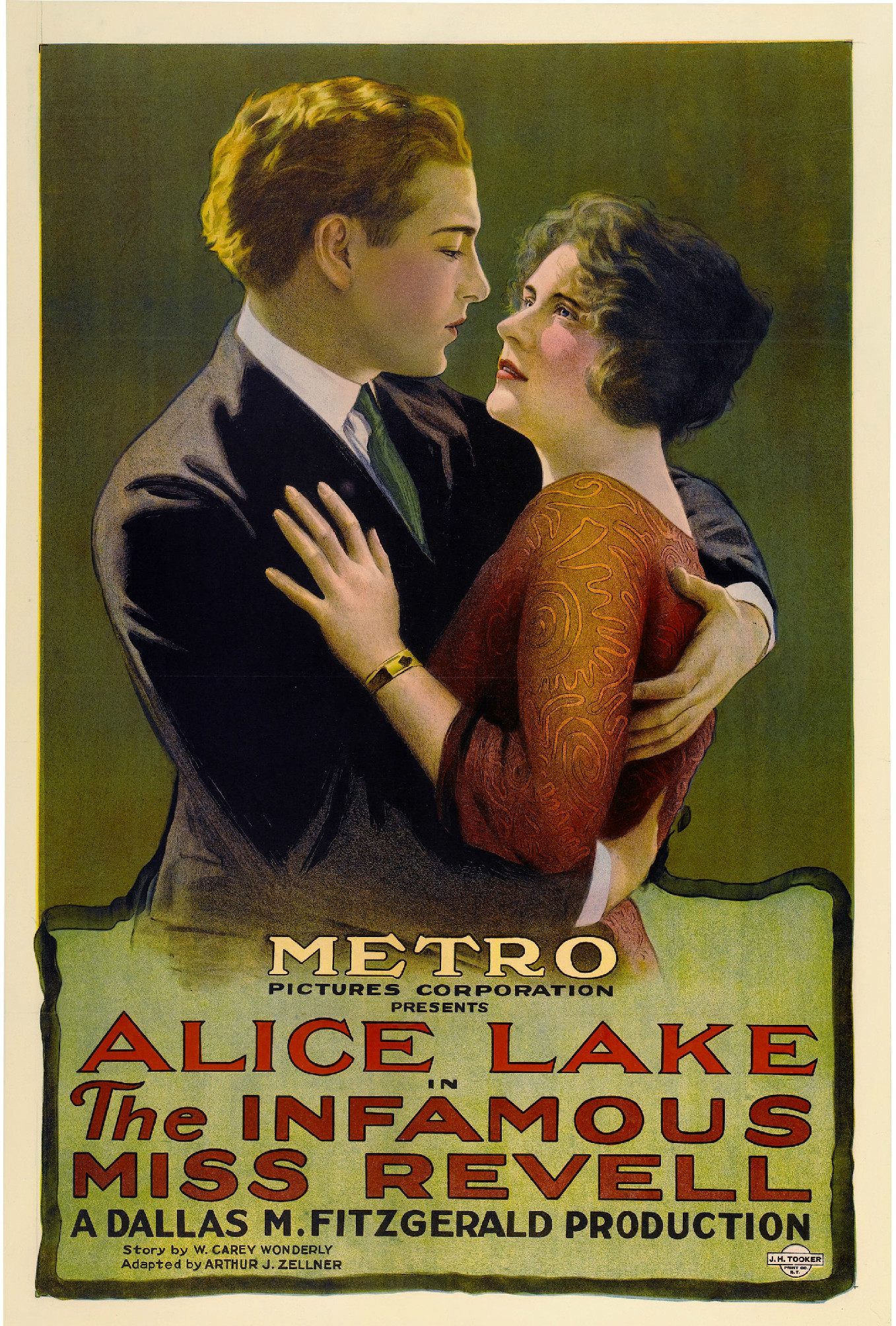
Poster for The Infamous Miss Revell

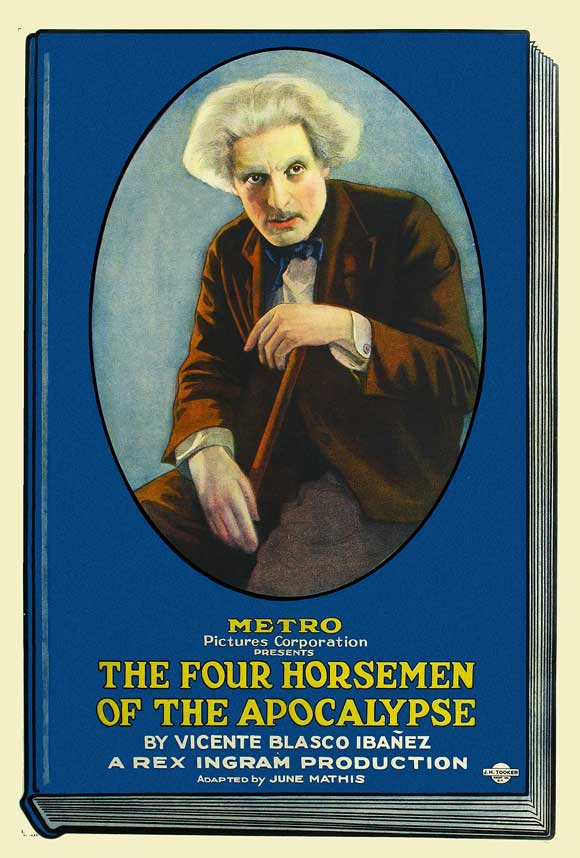
Lobby poster for The Four Horsemen of the Apocalypse

Release date	Film	Status/References
January 1, 1920	Nothing But the Truth	
January 11, 1920	Stronger Than Death	
January 31, 1920	The Willow Tree	
February 1, 1920	The Walk-Offs	
February 17, 1920	A Modern Salome	
February 29, 1920	The Right of Way	
March 1, 1920	The Very Idea	
April 1, 1920	Dangerous to Men	
April 1, 1920	Nothing But Lies	
April 11, 1920	The Heart of a Child	
April 14, 1920	Alias Jimmy Valentine	
May 16, 1920	Shore Acres	
May 20, 1920	Burning Daylight	
May 23, 1920	Old Lady 31	
June 7, 1920	The Cheater	
July 1, 1920	The Best of Luck	
July 5, 1920	Parlor, Bedroom and Bath	
July 19, 1920	The Misfit Wife	
August 2, 1920	Held in Trust	
August 15, 1920	The Great Redeemer	
August 16, 1920	The Chorus Girl's Romance	
September 6, 1920	Love, Honor and Obey	
September 7, 1920	The Hope	
September 13, 1920	The Price of Redemption	
September 27, 1920	Clothes	
October 1920	The Mutiny of the Elsinore	Incomplete
October 4, 1920	Blackmail	
October 4, 1920	Madame Peacock	
October 11, 1920	The Saphead	
October 24, 1920	The Great Redeemer	
October 25, 1920	Body and Soul	
November 1, 1920	The Fatal Hour	
November 8, 1920	Are All Men Alike?	
November 15, 1920	Someone in the House	
November 27, 1920	The Star Rover	
November 29, 1920	Polly With a Past	
December 1920	Love's Triumph	Unsure it was ever released, might be Should a Woman Tell? (1919)
December 6, 1920	Billions	
December 13, 1920	Hearts are Trumps	
December 20, 1920	The Misleading Lady	
December 27, 1920	Cinderella's Twin	
January 10, 1921	The Lure of Youth	
January 17, 1921	The Marriage of William Ashe	
January 21, 1921	The Match-Breaker	
January 21, 1921	The Greater Claim	Incomplete
January 29, 1921	The Silver Lining	
January 31, 1921	The Off-Shore Pirate	
February 7, 1921	Passion Fruit	
March 6, 1921	The Four Horsemen of the Apocalypse	Inducted into the National Film Registry in 1995
March 7, 1921	Extravagance	
March 20, 1921	Without Limit	
March 28, 1921	Puppets of Fate	
April 11, 1921	A Message from Mars	
April 25, 1921	Uncharted Seas	
May 1, 1921	The Little Fool	
May 13, 1921	Coincidence	
May 23, 1921	The Last Card	
June 16, 1921	Home Stuff	
June 20, 1921	Fine Feathers	
July 4, 1921	The Man Who	
July 18, 1921	Over the Wire	
August 1, 1921	Life's Darn Funny	
August 16, 1921	Big Game	
September 5, 1921	A Trip to Paradise	
September 19, 1921	The Match-Breaker	
September 26, 1921	Camille	
October 5, 1921	Garments of Truth	
October 17, 1921	The Infamous Miss Revell	
October 31, 1921	Alias Ladyfingers	
October 31, 1921	Ladyfingers	
November 14, 1921	There Are No Villains	
November 20, 1921	Fightin' Mad	
November 21, 1921	The Conquering Power	
November 28, 1921	The Hunch	
December 12, 1921	The Hole in the Wall	
December 26, 1921	The Idle Rich	
January 8, 1922	Little Eva Ascends	
January 9, 1922	The Fourteenth Lover	
January 9, 1922	White Hands	
January 23, 1922	Peacock Alley	Incomplete
February 1, 1922	The Stroke of Midnight	US release of Swedish film
February 6, 1922	The Golden Gift	
February 20, 1922	The Right That Failed	
February 27, 1922	Turn to the Right	
March 6, 1922	Glass Houses	
March 20, 1922	I Can Explain	
April 3, 1922	Kisses	
April 10, 1922	Fascination	
April 17, 1922	The Face Between	
May 1, 1922	Seeing's Believing	
May 15, 1922	Don't Write Letters	
May 20, 1922	Hate	
June 12, 1922	They Like 'Em Rough	
June 26, 1922	Sherlock Brown	
July 23, 1922	Forget Me Not	
August 26, 1922	The Hands of Nara	
September 4, 1922	The Five Dollar Baby	
September 11, 1922	The Prisoner of Zenda	
September 25, 1922	Broadway Rose	
October 16, 1922	Youth to Youth	
October 23, 1922	June Madness	incomplete, 4 reels of 6
November 6, 1922	Trifling Women	
November 13, 1922	Enter Madame	
November 20, 1922	The Forgotten Law	
November 26, 1922	The Toll of the Sea	
December 4, 1922	Quincy Adams Sawyer	
December 11, 1922	Love in the Dark	
December 18, 1922	Peg o' My Heart	Incomplete
January 1, 1923	Hearts Aflame	
January 18, 1923	The Fog	
January 19, 1923	All the Brothers Were Valiant	Fragment
February 5, 1923	Crinoline and Romance	
February 12, 1923	Jazzmania	
February 19, 1923	The Famous Mrs. Fair	
February 20, 1923	The Woman in Chains	
February 25, 1923	Success	
February 26, 1923	The Woman of Bronze	
March 5, 1923	Your Friend and Mine	
March 12, 1923	A Noise in Newboro	
March 19, 1923	Where the Pavement Ends	
April 9, 1923	Her Fatal Millions	
April 16, 1923	An Old Sweetheart of Mine	
April 30, 1923	Cordelia the Magnificent	
May 7, 1923	Soul of the Beast	
June 18, 1923	The Fog	
September 3, 1923	The French Doll	
September 5, 1923	The White Sister	
September 10, 1923	Strangers of the Night	
September 17, 1923	Rouged Lips	
September 19, 1923	A Wife's Romance	
September 24, 1923	Three Ages	
September 30, 1923	Scaramouche	
October 1, 1923	Desire	
October 15, 1923	The Eagle's Feather	
October 1923	The Social Code	
November 22, 1923	Held to Answer	
November 26, 1923	Long Live the King	
December 10, 1923	In Search of a Thrill	
December 24, 1923	The Man Life Passed By	
October 8, 1923	The Eternal Struggle	
November 5, 1923	Pleasure Mad	
November 19, 1923	Our Hospitality	
December 3, 1923	Fashion Row	
December 24, 1923	The Man Life Passed By	
January 14, 1924	Half-A-Dollar-Bill	
January 24, 1924	The Heart Bandit	
January 28, 1924	A Fool's Awakening	
February 4, 1924	Thy Name Is Woman	
February 11, 1924	The Uninvited Guest	
March 9, 1924	Happiness	
March 24, 1924	Don't Doubt Your Husband	
March 31, 1924	The Shooting of Dan McGrew	
April 19, 1924	Sherlock Jr.	Inducted into the National Film Registry in 1991
