= The Gold Cure =

The Gold Cure may refer to:

- The Gold Cure (1919 film), 1919 American silent film directed by John H. Collins
- The Gold Cure (1925 film), 1925 British silent film directed by W.P. Kellino
