= Daniel Jarrett =

American actor (1880s/1890s–1938)

Daniel Joseph Jarrett (November 22, 188? of 189? – March 13, 1938) was an actor and screenwriter in the United States. He should not be confused with his father, the Welsh-born stage actor Daniel Jarrett Sullivan, who also performed on the stage as Daniel Jarrett and died in 1917. He was the brother of screenwriter and actor Arthur L. Jarrett.

== Life and career ==
Daniel Joseph Jarrett was born in Boston, Massachusetts. Primary documents give the day of his birth as November 22. but give conflicting years for his date of birth. The U.S., Veterans Administration Master Index, 1917–1940 states he was born in 1893 but his entry in the U.S., World War I Draft Registration Cards, 1917–1918 gives his year of birth as 1887. This latter year matches his record in the 1910 United States Federal Census. However, his record in the 1900 United States Federal Census with identical family member names to the 1910 census gives his birth year as 1886. His record in the U.S., Social Security Applications and Claims Index, 1936–2007 gives his birth year as 1892.

Jarett graduated from Public School no. 16 in Brooklyn in June 1902. In 1904 he performed the role of Upson Asterbilt in an amateur production of Charles Townsend's Uncle Rube in Brooklyn. In 1905 he became a member of the American Stock Company (ASC) in which his father was a leading actor. He performed with the ASC at the Columbia Theatre in Brooklyn as Lal Chowder in a stage adaption of the Sherlock Holmes mystery The Sign of the Four with his father portraying Inspector Jones of Scotland Yard. This was followed by performances of the plays The Silver King (as Bilcher) For Her Sake (as Streiber), and Dr. Jekyll and Mr. Hyde (as James). In 1906 he performed with Edward De Corsia's theatre troupe as Medicine Jim in The Broneo Buster. In 1907 he portrayed Miguel Castro in Richard Brinsley Sheridan's Pizarro at the Richmond Theatre on Staten Island.

Jarett made his Broadway debut at the Garden Theatre as Ralph Bixby in the 1909 revival of Benjamin Chapin's Lincoln with Chapin returning to the eponymous role of the American president. In 1910 he performed as Arthur Kendall in Checkers at the Court Theater. In 1912 he returned to Broadway as the Clerk in Louis Evan Shipman's The Grain of Dust at the Criterion Theatre. In 1913 he toured in vaudeville with Marie Dressler. In 1914 he performed in the Trail of the Lonesome Pine at the Bronx Opera House. In 1915 he starred in Albert Cowles's Under Orders at the Westchester Theatre.

He acted in the 1914 film The Scales of Justice (film), the 1916 film Kennedy Square, the 1917 film Miss Robinson Crusoe, the 1917 film The Slacker and the 1922 film Sunshine Harbor.

Jarrett moved to Hollywood, California in 1944. He died in Los Angeles on March 13, 1938. His obituary stated he was 47 years old at the time of his death.

== Filmography ==
- The Scales of Justice (film) (1914)
- Kennedy Square (1916)
- Miss Robinson Crusoe (1917)
- The Slacker (1917)
- Sunshine Harbor (1922) as Dugan
- The Cowboy Millionaire (1935 film), story and screenplay
- Daniel Boone (1936 film), screenplay
- Roll Along, Cowboy (1937), screenplay
- Windjammer (1937 film), screenplay
- Hawaiian Buckaroo (1938)
- Tomahawk (film)(1951), story
