= Irene Howley =

American actress

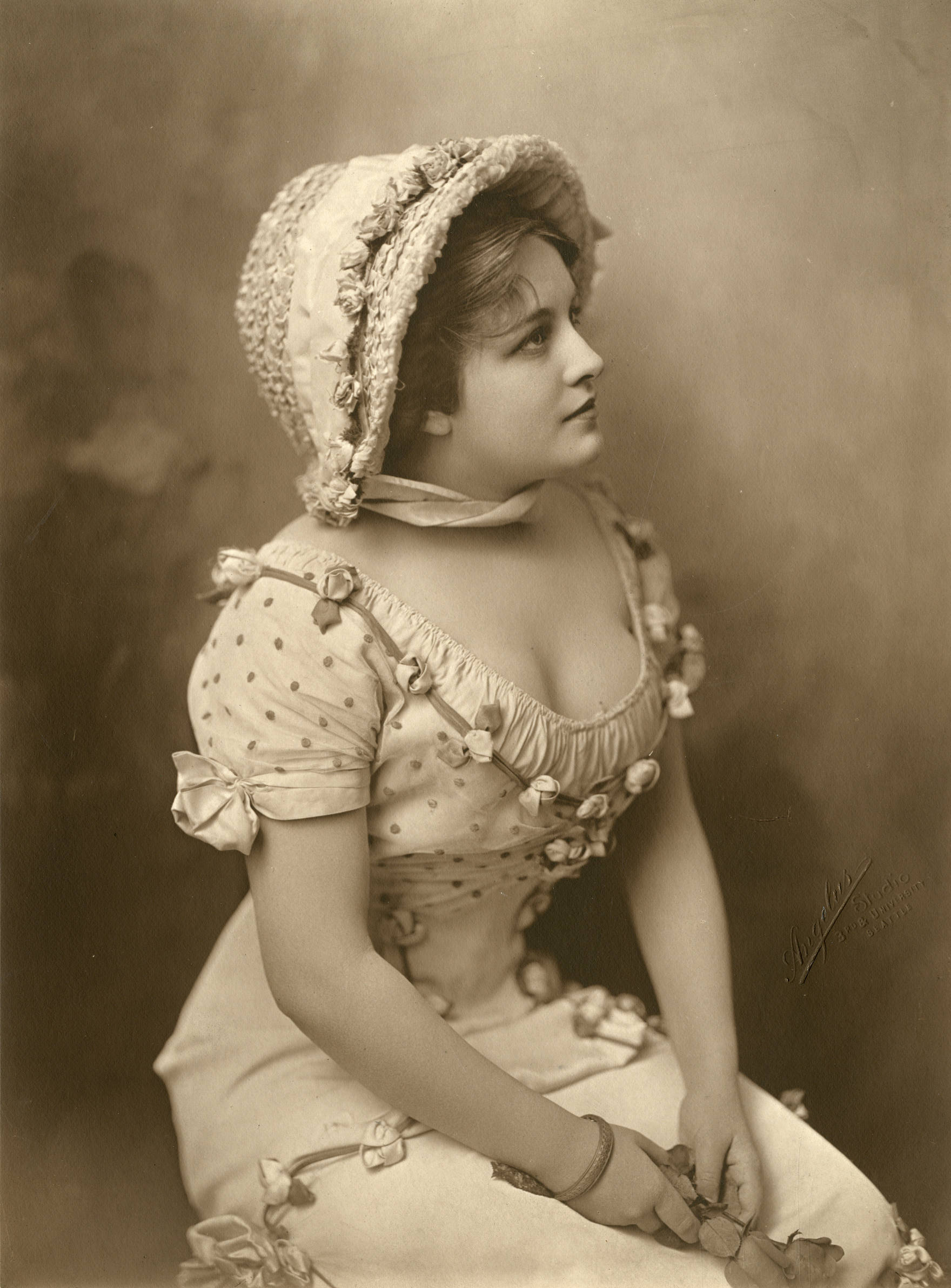

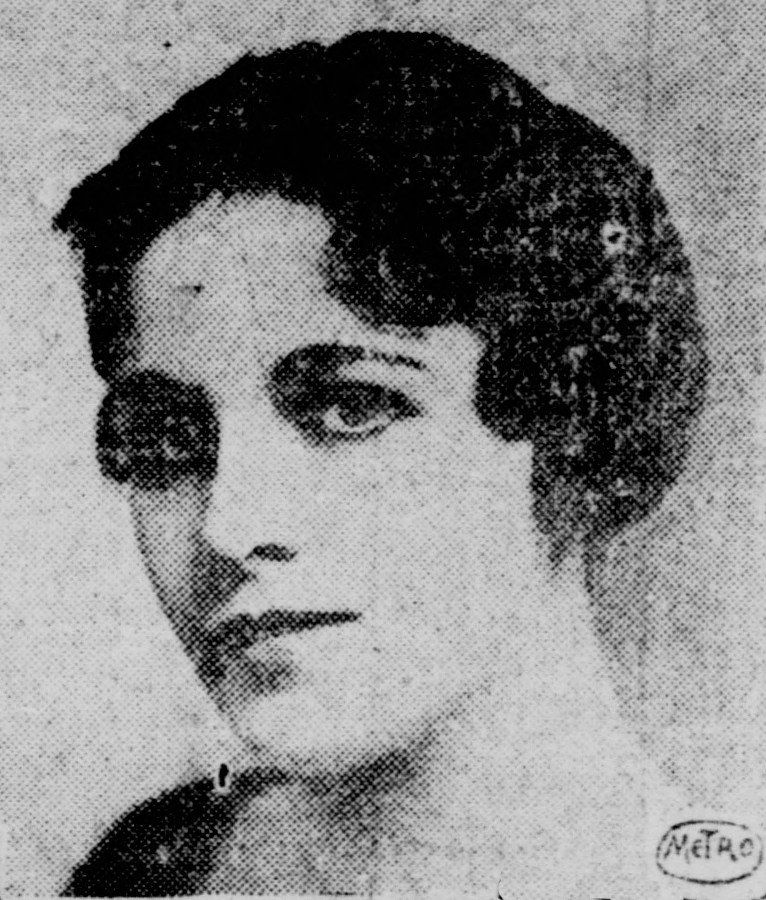

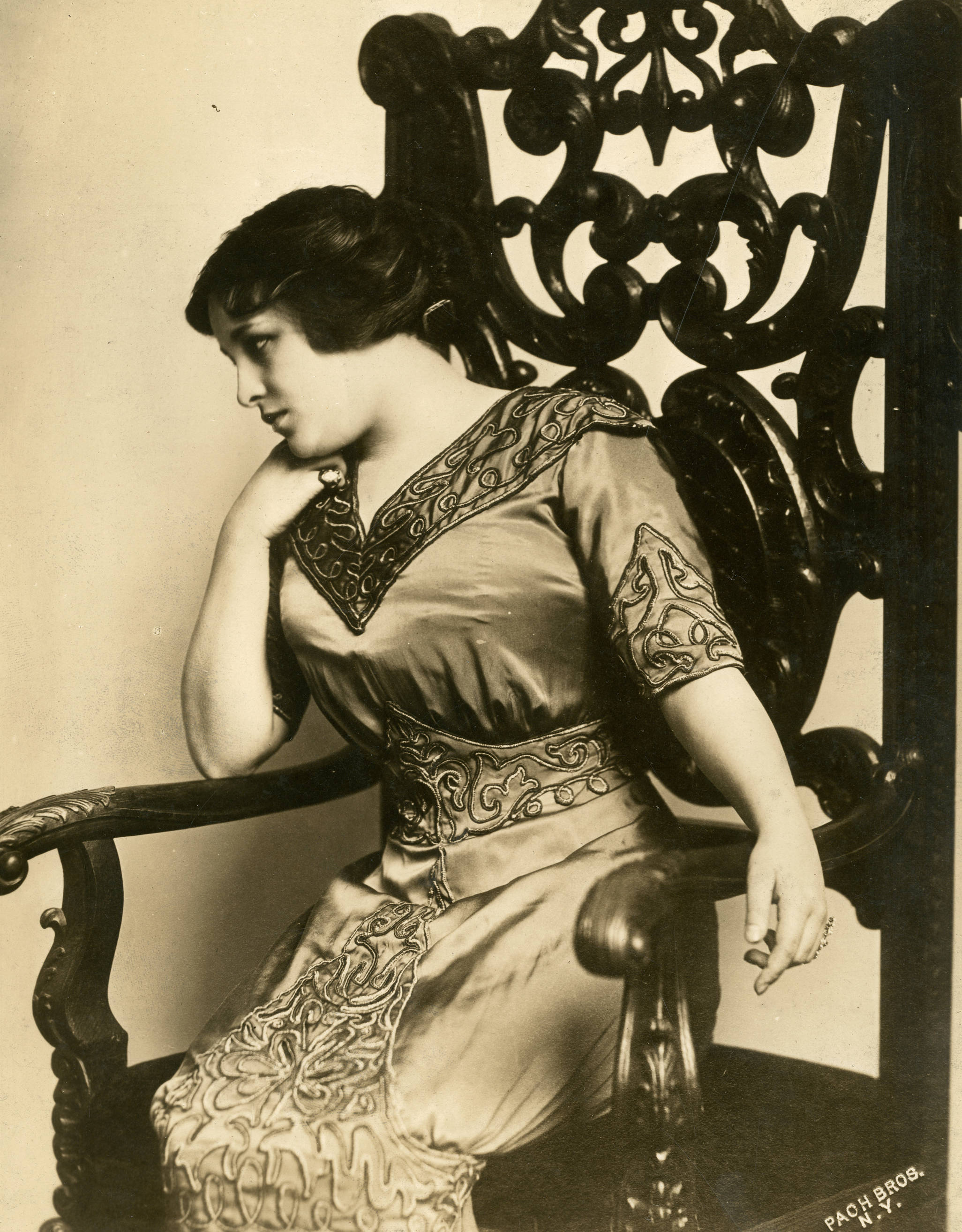

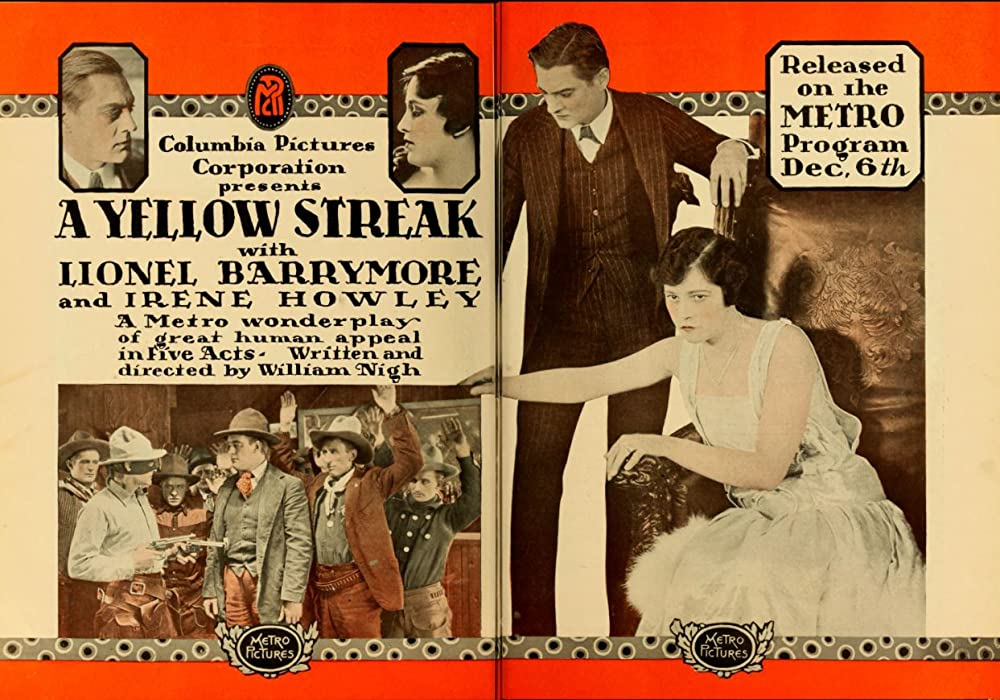

Irene Howley (born August 7, 1888 - ? ) was a performer on stage and a film actress in the United States. She was a chorus girl and then a principal performer in vaudeville shows. D. W. Griffith recruited her for film productions. She had leading roles.

Sheet music for The Cosey Rag states "Originally Introduced by Irene Howley".

== Filmography ==
- Her Rosary (1913), short film
- Under the Gaslight (film) (1914) as Pearl Courtland
- A Yellow Streak (1915) with Lionel Barrymore as Mary Austin
- Life's Shadows (1916 American film) as Madge Morrow
- The Heart of Jennifer (1915) as Agnes Murray
- The Moth and the Flame (1915 film) as Jeannette Graham
- The Purple Lady (1916) as Fifi Melotte
- Her Father's Keeper (1917) as Claire Masters
- His Father's Son (1917) as Betty Arden
- Is Love Everything? (1924) as Mrs. Rowland
