= Sunshine Harbor =

1922 film

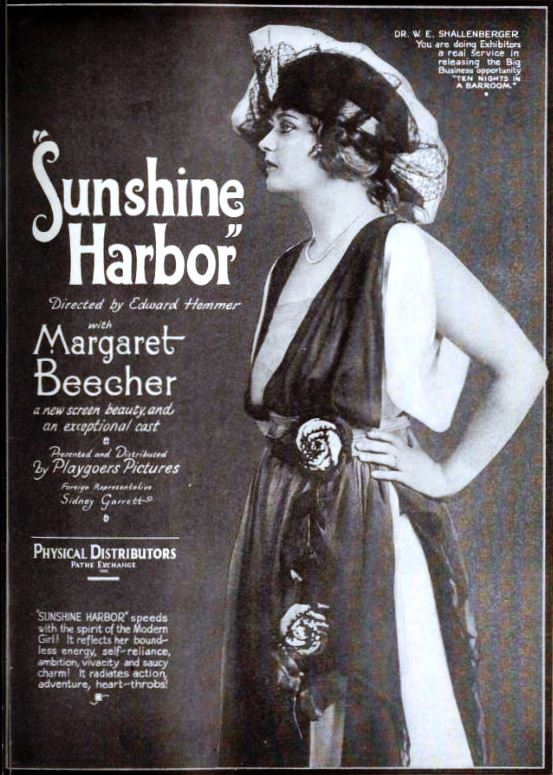
- Directed by: Edward L. Hemmer
- Written by: Jerome N. Wilson
- Starring: Margaret Beecher; Howard Hall; Coit Albertson
- Cinematography: William H. Tuers
- Production company: Playgoers Pictures
- Distributed by: Associated Exhibitors
- Release date: April 2, 1922
- Running time: 50 minutes
- Country: United States
- Languages: Silent; English intertitles

Sunshine Harbor is a 1922 American silent drama film directed by Edward L. Hemmer and starring Margaret Beecher, Howard Hall and Coit Albertson.

== Cast ==
- Margaret Beecher as Betty Hopkins
- Howard Hall as Dr. Hopkins
- Coit Albertson as Hamilton Graves
- Ralf Harolde as Billy Saunders
- Julian Greer as Editor MacSorley
- Daniel Jarrett as Dugan

== Bibliography ==
- Munden, Kenneth White. The American Film Institute Catalog of Motion Pictures Produced in the United States, Part 1. University of California Press, 1997.
