= Is Love Everything? =

1924 film directed by Christy Cabanne

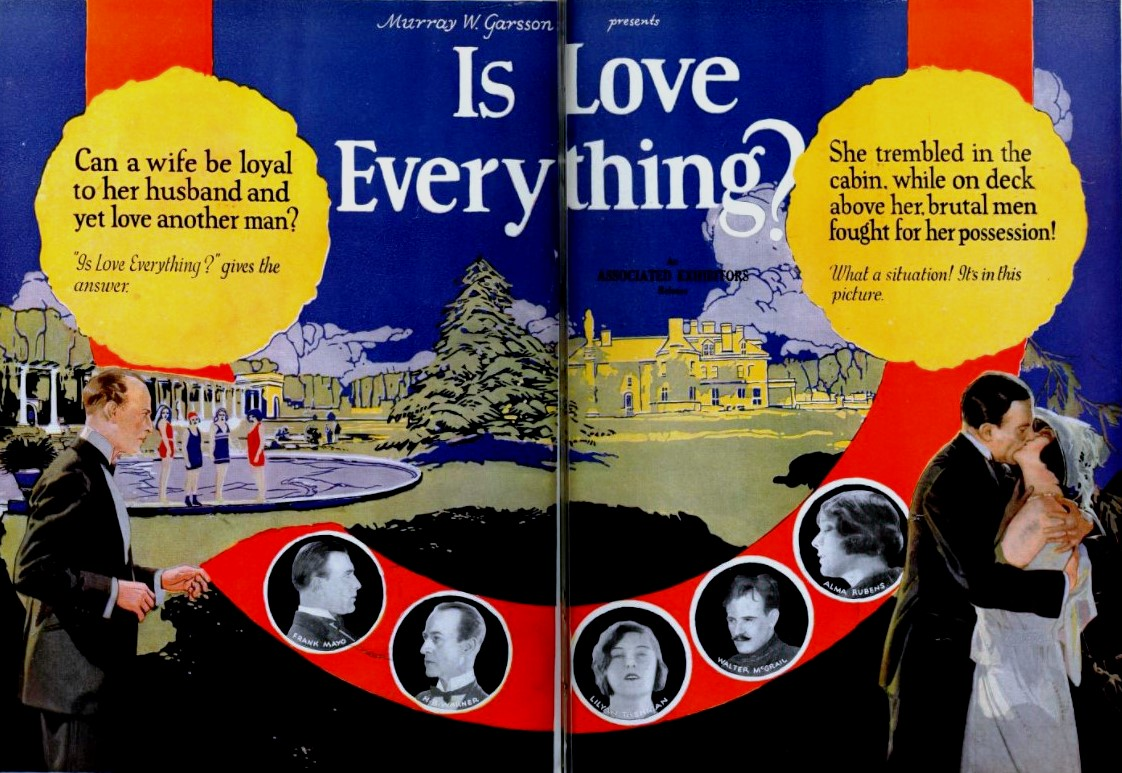
- Advertisement
- Directed by: Christy Cabanne
- Written by: Christy Cabanne; Raymond S. Harris
- Produced by: Murray W. Garsson
- Starring: Alma Rubens; Frank Mayo; H. B. Warner
- Cinematography: Walter Arthur; Philip Armand
- Edited by: William B. Laub
- Production company: Garsson Enterprises
- Distributed by: Associated Exhibitors
- Release date: November 30, 1924 (US)
- Running time: 6 reels
- Country: United States
- Language: Silent (English intertitles)

Is Love Everything? is a 1924 silent American melodrama film directed by Christy Cabanne. It stars Alma Rubens, Frank Mayo, and H. B. Warner, and was released on November 30, 1924.

== Plot ==
As described in a review in a film magazine, unable to decide between steady-going and wealthy Jordon (Warner) whom she admires and happy-go-lucky Robert (Mayo) whom she really loves, Jordon's money influences her mother's opinion and Virginia marries him. Her scapegrace brother Boyd (McGrail) steals her old love letters from Robert and tries to sell them to Jordon, who destroys them. Jordon however plans a test by inviting Robert to a yacht cruise. A collision destroys the yacht but Robert, Boyd, and Virginia are among those rescued. Robert continues to plead his love and although Virginia is true to his memory, she finally consents to marry him, believing Jordon dead. Jordon however has been picked up and comes home just at this time. Realizing their happiness and willing to sacrifice his own feelings in his great love for Virginia, he decides to let them continue to believe him dead, and goes away with the sea captain who rescued him.

== Cast list ==
- Alma Rubens as Virginia Carter
- Frank Mayo as Robert Whitney
- H. B. Warner as Jordan Southwick
- Walter McGrail as Boyd Carter
- Lilyan Tashman as Edythe Stanley
- Marie Schaefer as Mrs. Carter
- Irene Howley as Mrs. Rowland

== Preservation ==
A fragment of Is Love Everything? exists at the BFI National Film and Television Archive in London.
