= Howard Hall (actor) =

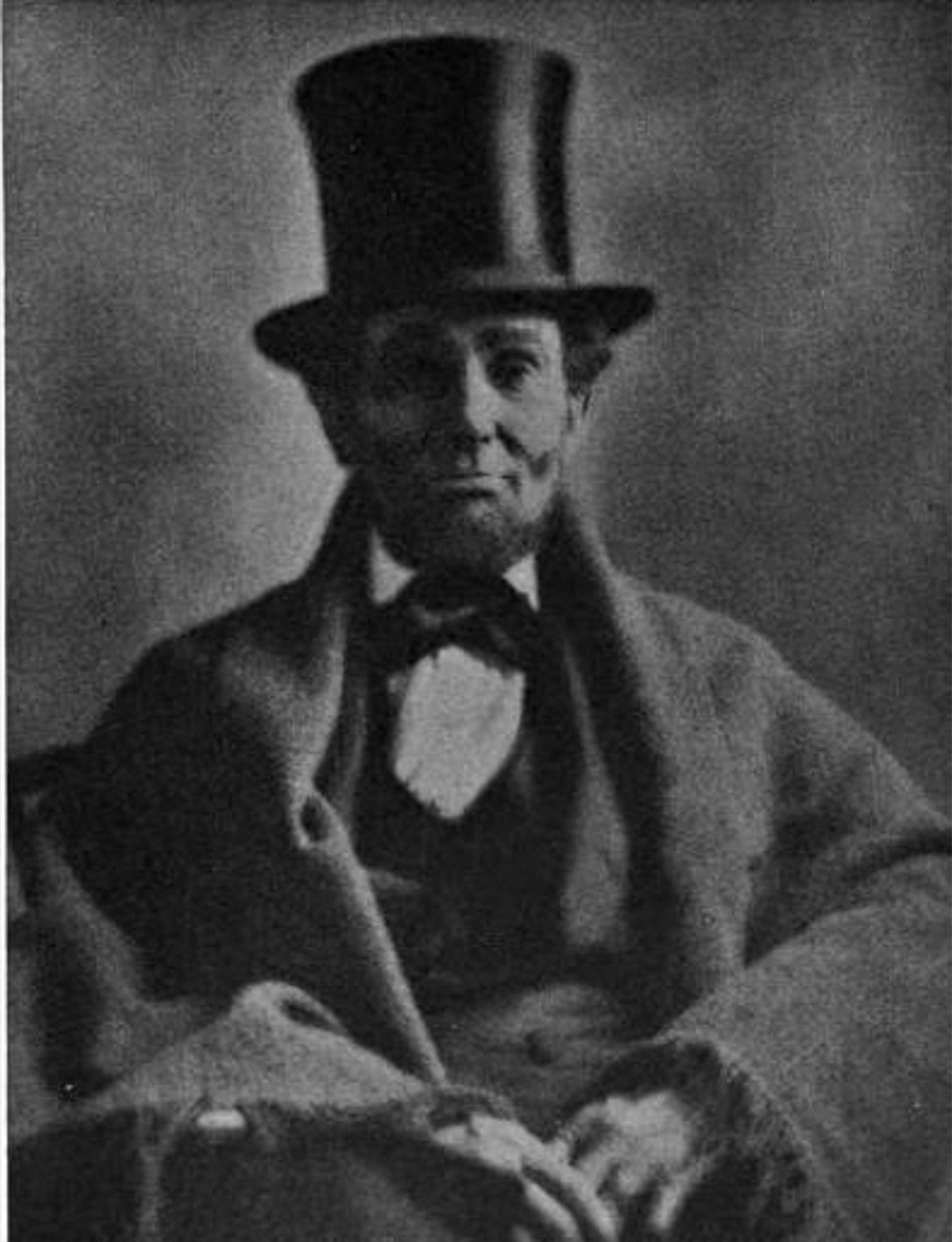
Hall as Abraham Lincoln in the 1920 play A Man of the People

Howard Hall (born Charles Sumner; 30 May 1867 – 25 July 1921) was an American actor and writer, best known for Kidnapped in New York and Alias Mrs. Jessop.

Hall was born in 1867 in Michigan. He died on 1921 in Long Beach, California.

== Theater ==
- A Soldier of Empire, writer
- Kidnapped in New York, writer "from true wvents"

== Filmography ==
- The Crown Prince's Double (1915)
- The Clarion (1916)
- According to Law (1916)
- The Hungry Heart (1917)
- The Barrier (1917)
- The Weavers of Life (1917)
- Alias Mrs. Jessop (1917)
- Flower of the Dusk (1918)
- Treason (1918)
- The Echo of Youth (1919)
- The Human Orchid (1916)
- The Price of Innocence (1919)
- The Gold Cure (1919)
- Sunshine Harbor (1922)
