= Roll Along, Cowboy =

1937 film by Gus Meins

- Directed by: Gus Meins
- Written by: Daniel Jarrett
- Based on: The Dude Ranger by Zane Grey
- Produced by: Sol Lesser (producer)
- Starring: See below
- Cinematography: Harry Neumann
- Edited by: Arthur Hilton; Albert Jordan
- Distributed by: 20th Century Fox
- Release date: October 8, 1937
- Running time: 57 minutes
- Country: United States
- Language: English

Roll Along, Cowboy is a 1937 American Western film directed by Gus Meins. It is based on the 1931 novel The Dude Ranger by Zane Grey, and is the second adaptation of the novel, after the 1934 film The Dude Ranger.

== Cast ==
- Smith Ballew as Randy Porter
- Cecilia Parker as Janet Blake
- Stanley Fields as Barry Barker
- Ruth Robinson as Edwina Blake
- Wally Albright as Danny Blake
- Frank Milan as Arthur Hathaway
- Bill Elliott as Odie Fenton
- Budd Buster as Cowhand Shorty
- Harry Bernard as Ranch foreman Shepard
- Buster Fite as Singing cowhand
- Buster Fite and His Six Saddle Tramps as Singing cowhands
