= John H. Collins (director) =

American screenwriter and director (1889–1918)

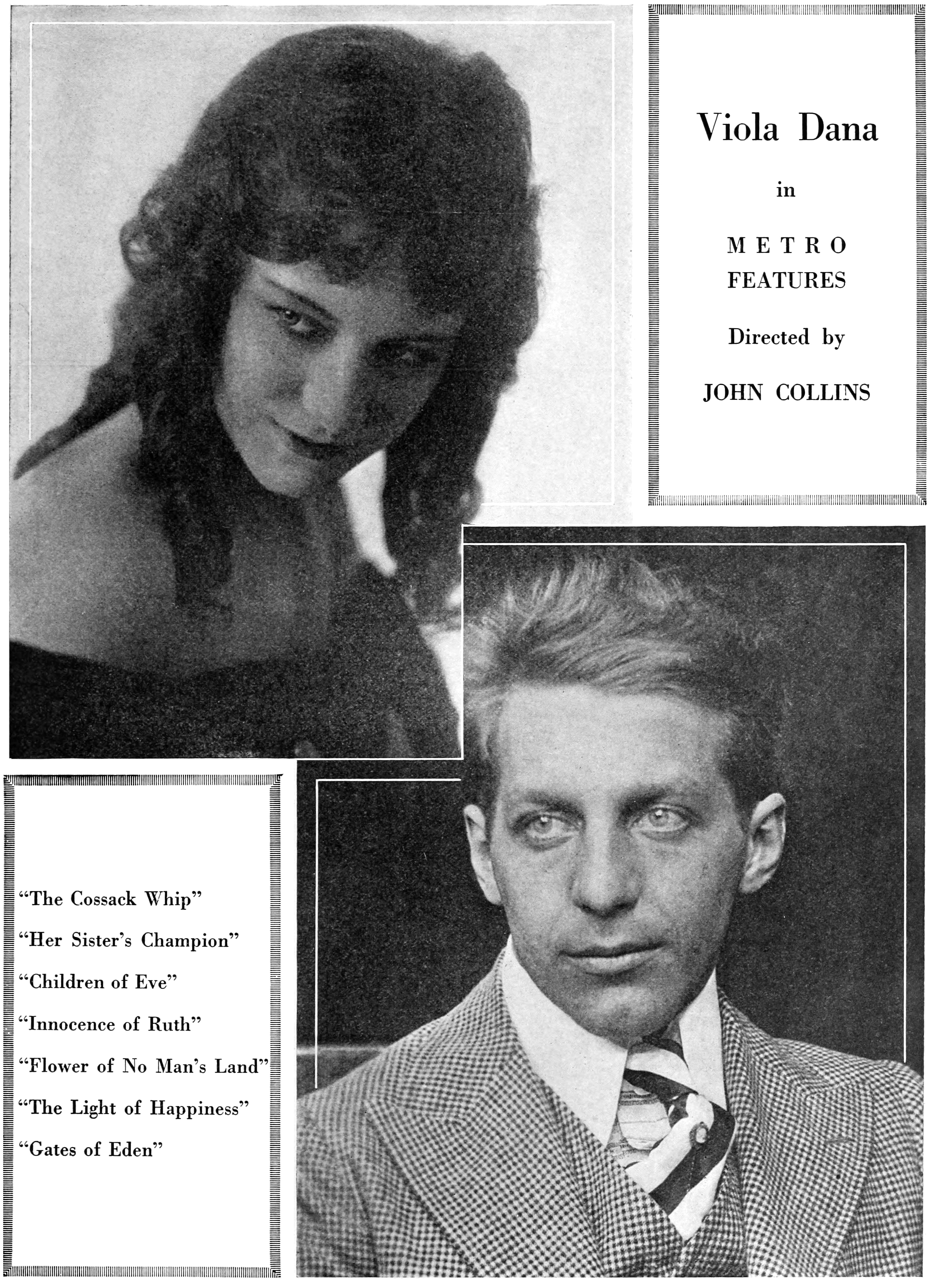
- Born: John Hancock Collins; December 31, 1889; New York City, New York
- Died: October 31, 1918 (aged 28); New York City, New York
- Occupation: film director
- Years active: 1914–18
- Spouse: Viola Dana

John H. Collins (December 31, 1889 – October 31, 1918) was an American writer and director of the silent film era. He married film actress Viola Dana. His career was cut short when he died at the age of 28 due to the 1918 influenza epidemic. During his career which began in 1914, he directed more than 40 features and film shorts, and wrote the scenario for over a dozen more features. His 1917 film The Girl Without a Soul was selected by the National Film Registry to be preserved by the Library of Congress. His final works were shown posthumously in 1919.

== Partial filmography ==
- Cohen's Luck (1915)
- Gladiola (1915)
- The Man Who Could Not Sleep (1915)
- Children of Eve (1915)
- On Dangerous Paths (1915)
- The Flower of No Man's Land (1916)
- The Light of Happiness (1916)
- The Gates of Eden (1916)
- The Innocence of Ruth (1916)
- The Cossack Whip (1916)
- God's Law and Man's (1917)
- A Wife by Proxy (1917)
- Rosie O'Grady (1917)
- Lady Barnacle (1917)
- Aladdin's Other Lamp (1917)
- The Girl Without a Soul (1917)
- Blue Jeans (1917)
- The Winding Trail (1918)
- A Weaver of Dreams (1918)
- Riders of the Night (1918)
- Opportunity (1918)
- Flower of the Dusk (1918)
- The Gold Cure (1919)
- Satan Junior (1919)
