= Kennedy Square =

1916 historical film by S. Rankin Drew

- Directed by: S. Rankin Drew
- Based on: a novel by F. Hopkinson Smith
- Starring: Antonio Moreno; Muriel Ostriche
- Cinematography: Arthur T. Quinn
- Production companies: Vitagraph Company of America, Blue Ribbon
- Distributed by: V-L-S-E
- Release date: February 21, 1916
- Running time: 50 minutes; 5 reels
- Country: USA

Kennedy Square is a lost 1916 American silent historical drama film directed by S. Rankin Drew and starring Antonio Moreno, Muriel Ostriche and Charles Kent. It was produced by the Vitagraph Company of America and released through V-L-S-E.

== Cast ==
- Charles Kent - St. George Temple
- Antonio Moreno - Harry Rutter
- Muriel Ostriche - Kate Seymour
- Tom Brooke - Douglas Seymour
- Raymond Bloomer - Langdon Willetts
- Daniel Jarrett - Col. Rutter
- Hattie Delaro - Mrs. Rutter
- Harold Foshay - Doctor (*as Harold Forshay)
- Herbert Barry - Dawson
- Logan Paul - Artig
