= His Father's Son (1917 film) =

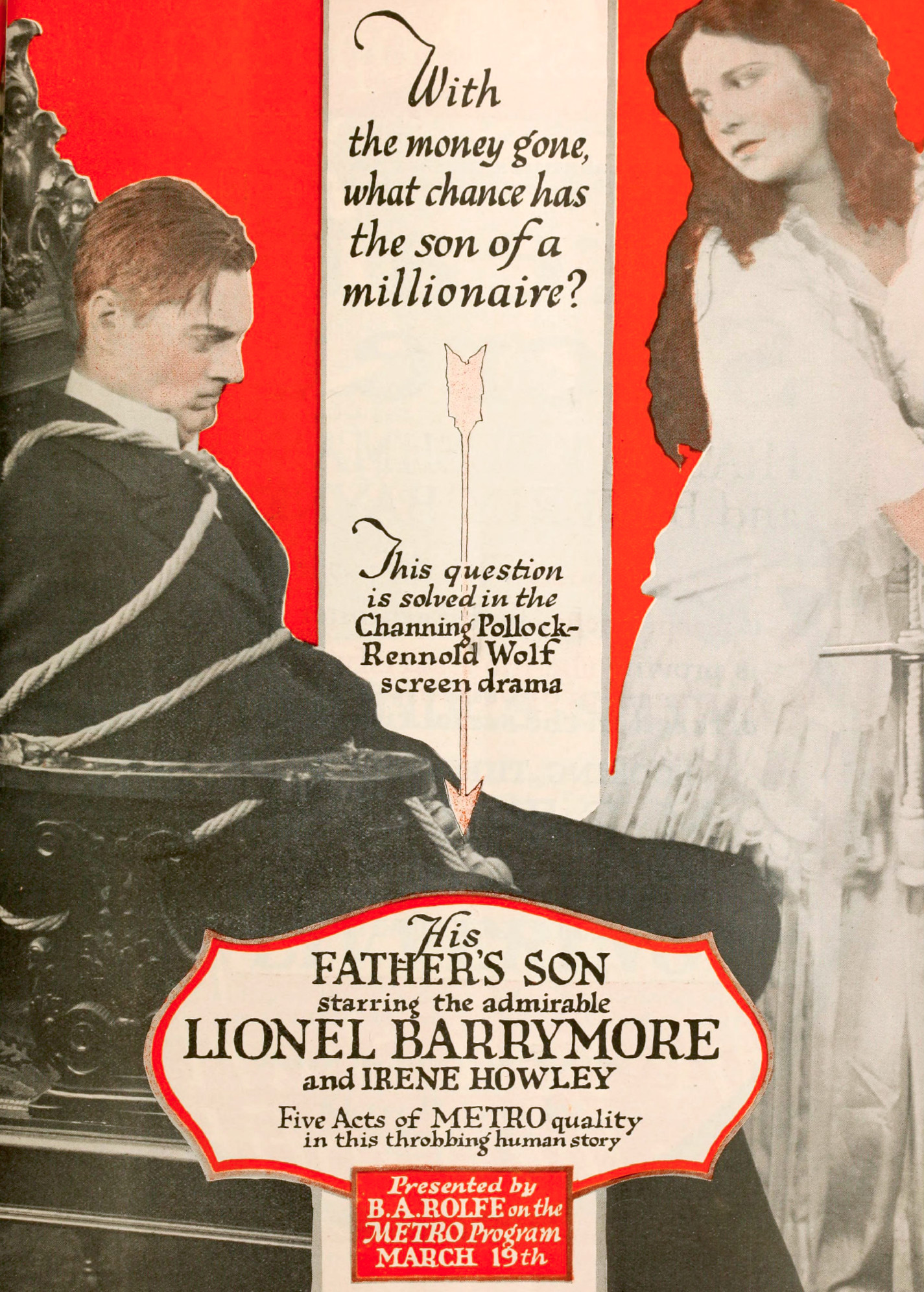
- Ad for the film
- Directed by: George D. Baker
- Written by: June Mathis
- Based on: a story by Channing Pollock and Rennold Wolf
- Starring: Lionel Barrymore
- Cinematography: John Arnold
- Production company: Rolfe Photoplays
- Distributed by: Metro Pictures
- Release date: March 19, 1917
- Running time: 5 reels
- Country: USA
- Language: Silent..English titles

His Father's Son is a 1917 silent film drama directed by George D. Baker and starring Lionel Barrymore. It was produced and distributed by Metro Pictures.

== Cast ==
- Lionel Barrymore - J. Dabney Barron
- Irene Howley - Betty Arden
- Frank Currier - John Arden
- Charles Eldridge - Adam Barron
- George A. Wright - Perkins
- Phil Sanford - Jim Foley
- Walter Horton - Lord Lawrence
- Hugh Jeffrey -
- Florence Natol -
- Ilean Hume -
- Marien Dennis -

== Preservation status ==
- A print exists in Archives Du Film Du CNC, Bois d'Arcy.

== See also ==
- Lionel Barrymore filmography
