= The Quitter (1916 film) =

1916 film

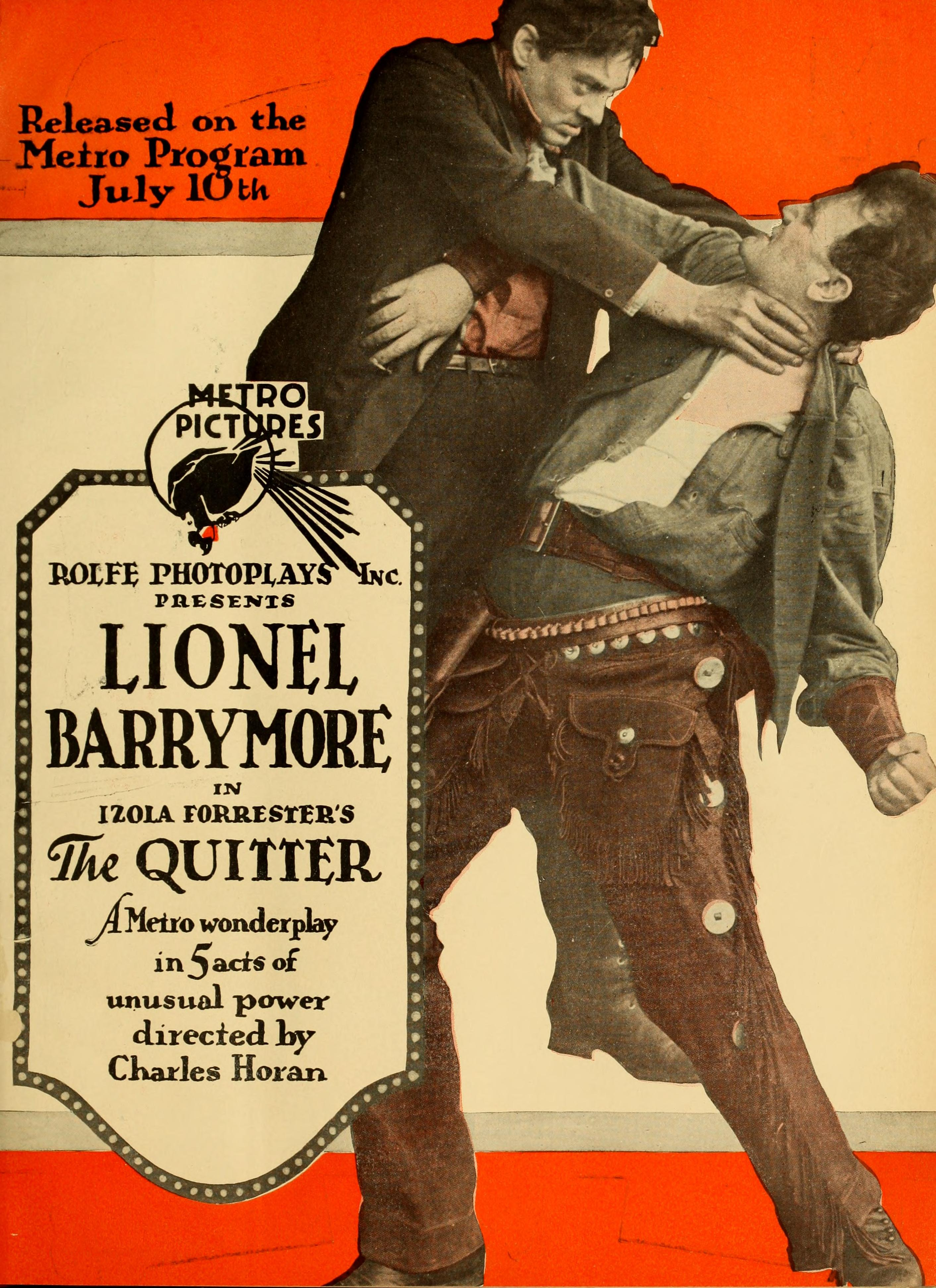
- Directed by: Charles Horan
- Written by: Izola Forrester (story)
- Starring: Lionel Barrymore
- Cinematography: John Arnold
- Production company: Rolfe Photoplays
- Distributed by: Metro Pictures
- Release date: July 10, 1916
- Running time: 5 reels
- Country: United States
- Languages: Silent; English intertitles

The Quitter is a 1916 American silent Western film directed by Charles Horan and starring Lionel Barrymore. It was produced by Rolfe Photoplays and distributed by Metro Pictures.

A copy is reportedly held at Nederlands Filmmuseum, now called EYE Film Institute at Amsterdam.

== Cast ==
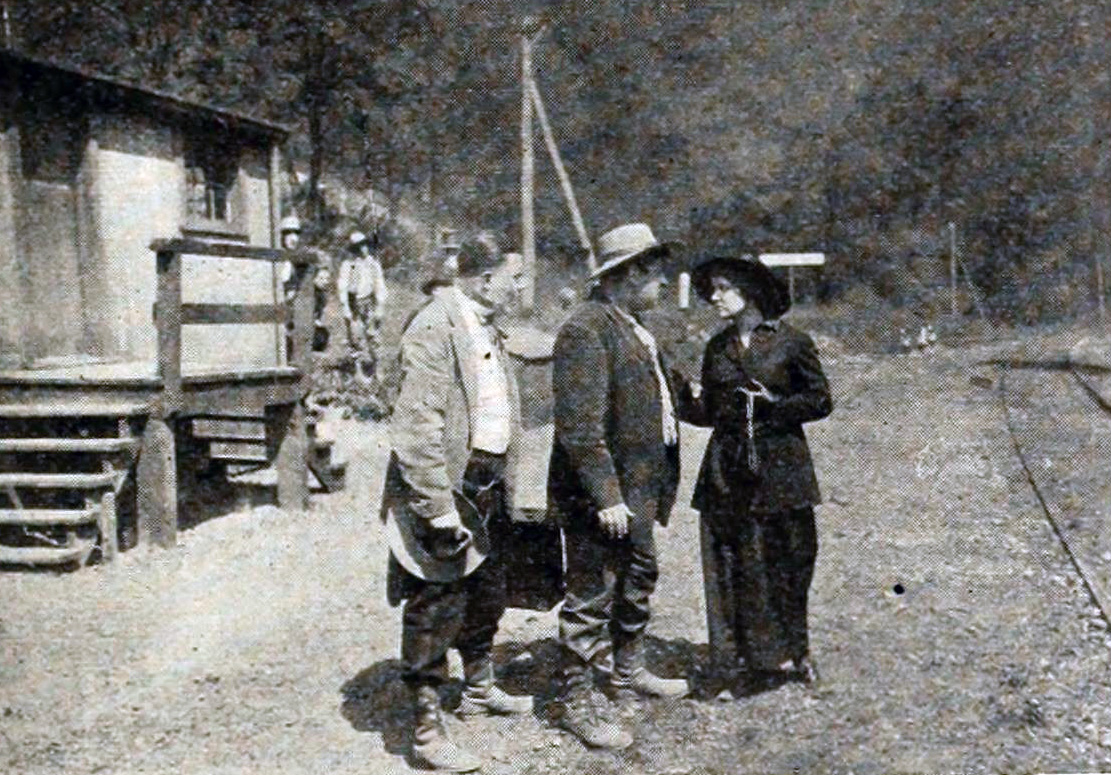
A still from the film

- Lionel Barrymore as "Happy" Jack Lewis
- Marguerite Skirvin as Glad Mason
- Paul Everton as W. E. Willet
- Charles Prince as "Big" Bill McFarland
- Julius D. Cowles as Seth Moore (aka Jules Cowles)
- Edward Brennan as Peter Condon
- Saagar Bains as himself
