= Alias Mrs. Jessop =

1916 American silent comedy film directed by Will S. Davis

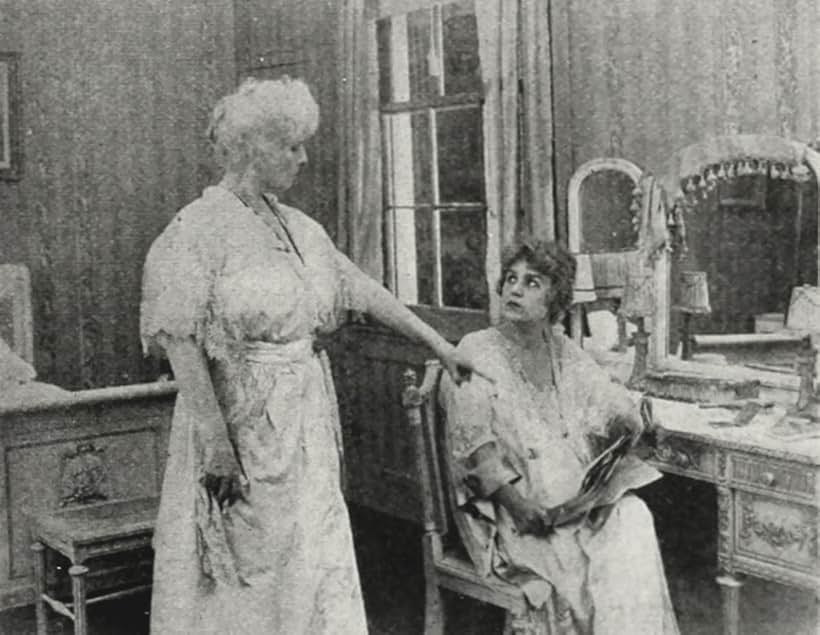
- Film still
- Directed by: Will S. Davis
- Written by: Albert Shelby Le Vino
- Based on: "Alias Mrs. Jessop" (short story) by Blair Hall
- Produced by: Maxwell Karger
- Starring: Emily Stevens; Howard Hall; William H. Tooker
- Cinematography: Arthur Martinelli; William Tuers
- Distributed by: Metro Pictures
- Release date: December 10, 1917
- Running time: 5 reels
- Country: United States
- Language: English

Alias Mrs. Jessop is a 1917 American silent comedy film directed by Will S. Davis and starring Emily Stevens, Howard Hall, and William H. Tooker. It was released on December 10, 1917.

== Plot ==
Identical twin cousins, Janet and Lillian Ford, are raised together in Lillian's upper-class home, since Janet is an orphan. When Janet takes the blame for Lillian's gambling arrest, Mrs. Ford orders Janet from their house. Years later, Lillian meets and marries Sir Anthony Jessop and moves to England. While well-off, Jessop's real wealth lies with his uncle, of whom he is the only heir. The couple have a son, Bobby, but Lillian does not forsake her wanton ways, staying out each night, and having an affair with Raymond Fleury. Jessop and Lillian argue about her indiscretions, and she leaves, heading for the United States supposedly to visit her dying father, and leaves Bobby with Jessop.

Upon her arrival in the States, she is surprised that Fleury has followed her. She looks up Janet, and convinces her to take her place at the Ford residence while her father dies. Lillian and Fleury travel the country. After the elder Ford dies, word comes from England that Bobby has had an accident. Not knowing how to contact Lillian, Janet travels to England, still impersonating her cousin. She tends for Bobby until he his well, although she lets Jessop know that she is not Lillian. While caring for Bobby, she and Jessop fall in love.

Jessop's uncle dies, and he becomes the Earl of Devon, along with his inheritance. When news of his new-found wealth reaches Lillian, she dumps Fleury and heads back to England to claim her portion. Her arrival throws both Jessop and Janet into a quandary. However, Fleury has followed her back to England, and when the two confront one another, he vows that if he can't have her, no man will, and shoots her, killing her.

Rather than risk a scandal, Jessop offers to secretly marry Janet, and the two can continue as if nothing had changed.

== Cast list ==
- Emily Stevens as Lillian Ford/Janet Ford
- Howard Hall as Sir Anthony Jessop
- William H. Tooker as Michael Ford
- Donald Hall as Raymond Fleury
- Lillian Paige as Mrs. Mary Ford
- Eldean Steuart as Bobby Jessop
- Sue Balfour as Ames, the nurse

== Production ==
The film is one of at least fifty from the period (about 1912–1924, "including shorts, multi-reelers and one 15 part serial") which made use of double exposure to create the illusion of the actor appearing on screen in two places at the same time in two roles, as noted by Lisa Bode in a survey of these films.

== Reception ==
According to Lisa Bode's survey, those who portrayed two roles on the screen were perceived as very capable and experienced, and the "separateness" or "differentiation of two personalities" by Stevens was one of those "foregrounded and praised" in contemporary reviews.

=== Censorship ===
In Québec, Alias Mrs. Jessop was denied permission to be shown in the Province without cuts by its motion picture rating system for the following reasons: "Immoral and suggestive; infidelity of a wife; murder and suicide."
