= Life's Shadows (1916 American film) =

1916 film

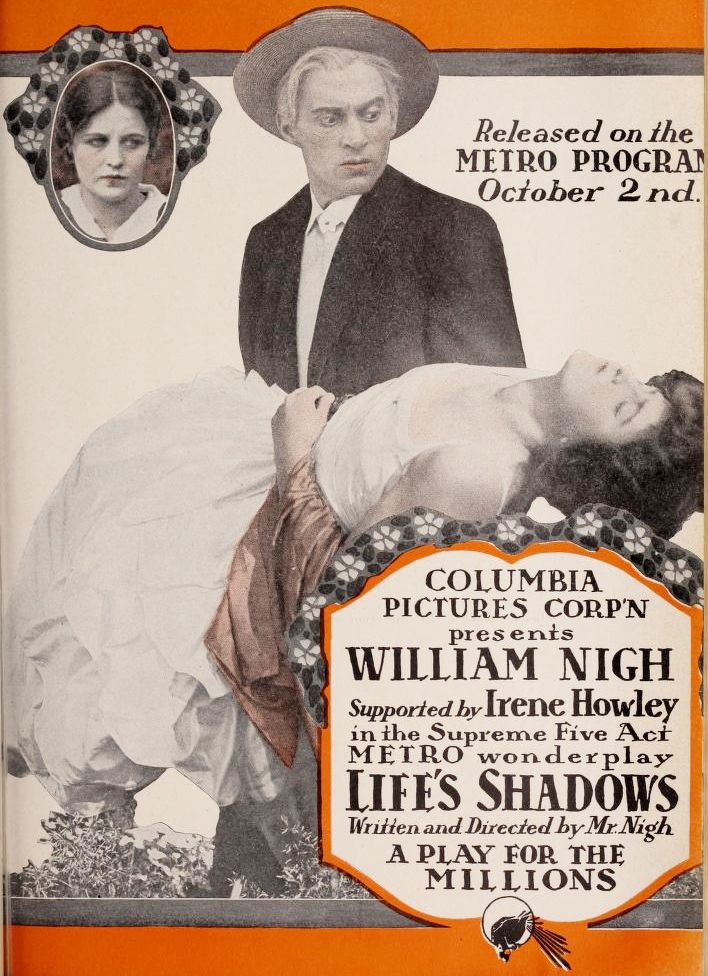
- Directed by: William Nigh
- Written by: William Nigh
- Starring: William Nigh; Irene Howley; Robert Elliott
- Cinematography: Alfred Huger Moses Jr.
- Production company: Columbia Pictures
- Distributed by: Metro Pictures
- Release date: October 9, 1916
- Running time: 50 minutes
- Country: United States
- Languages: Silent; English intertitles

Life's Shadows is a 1916 American silent drama film directed by William Nigh and starring Nigh, Irene Howley and Robert Elliott.

== Cast ==
- William Nigh as Martin Bradley
- Irene Howley as Madge Morrow
- Will S. Stevens as Hugh Thorndyke
- Robert Elliott as Rodney Thorndyke
- Roy Clair as Chester Thorndyke
- Kathleen Allaire as Dulcie Thorndyke
- Ruth Thorp as Mary Graves
- Grace Stevens as Melinda Liggett
- William Yearance as James Durkel
- Frank Montgomery as Jim Downing
- David Thompson as H. Spencer Seatoon
- Harry Linson as Lem Harding
- Harry Blakemore as Scudder Coleman

== Bibliography ==
- Parish, James Robert & Pitts, Michael R. Film directors: a guide to their American films. Scarecrow Press, 1974.
