= Flower of the Dusk =

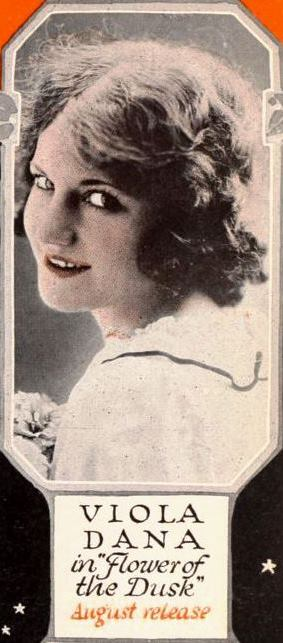
- Directed by: John H. Collins
- Written by: John H. Collins
- Produced by: Maxwell Karger
- Starring: Viola Dana
- Cinematography: John Arnold
- Distributed by: Metro Pictures
- Release date: August 12, 1918
- Running time: 5 reels
- Country: United States
- Language: Silent..English titles

Flower of the Dusk is a surviving 1918 American silent drama film directed by John H. Collins and starring his wife Viola Dana. It was produced by Maxwell Karger and distributed by Metro Pictures. The film is based on the 1908 novel by Myrtle Reed.

A print is held by Bois d'Arcy in France.

== Cast ==
- Viola Dana - Barbara North
- Howard Hall - Ambrose North
- Jack McGowan - Roger Austin
- Margaret McWade - Miriam
- Bliss Milford - Mattie Austin

unbilled

- Guy Coombs -
- Lettie Ford -
- Maggie Greyer -
- Alice Martin -
- Charles Sutton -
