= Riders of the Night =

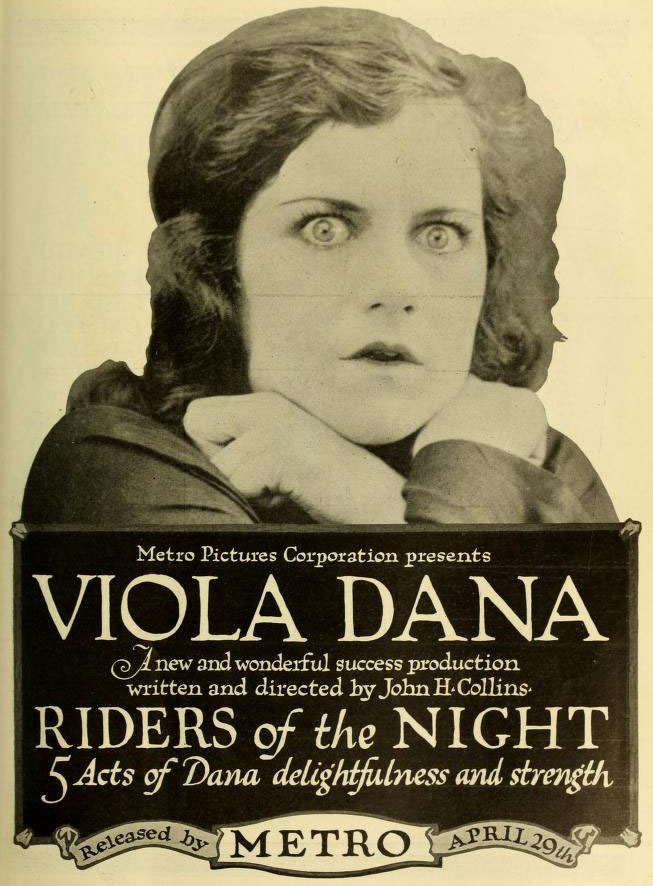
- Lobby poster
- Directed by: John H. Collins
- Written by: John H. Collins (story); Albert S. Le Vino (writer)
- Starring: Viola Dana
- Cinematography: John Arnold
- Distributed by: Metro Pictures
- Release date: April 29, 1918
- Running time: 5 reels
- Country: United States
- Language: Silent (English intertitles)

Riders of the Night is a 1918 American silent drama film directed by John H. Collins and starred his wife Viola Dana. It was produced and distributed by the Metro Pictures company.

A print is held at EYE Institute, Amsterdam aka Filmmuseum Amsterdam.

== Plot ==
As described in a Exhibitors Herald, Sally Castleton (Dana) is loved by Milt Derr (Chesebro), but Jed (Blue), a cousin of Milt, is desirous of possessing Sally. He makes several attempts to win Sally, but is repulsed each time. The night riders assemble against the gate keeper, who charges the villagers an excess toll. Two persons are killed, and Jed tells Sally that Milt is held and that the only way to free him is for Sally to marry Jed. Before he can extract a promise, he is killed. Sally, found departing from the Derr home by the chimney, is held for the murder. A few moments before she is to be hanged, Milt finds the true murderer. There is a happy ending for their romance.

== Cast ==
- Viola Dana as Sally Castleton
- George Chesebro as Milt Derr
- Clifford Bruce as John Derr
- Russell Simpson as Sally's Grandfather
- Mabel Van Buren as Sally's Aunt
- Monte Blue as Jed, 'The Killer'

== Reception ==
Like many American films of the time, Riders of the Night was subject to cuts by city and state film censorship boards. For example, the Chicago Board of Censors required cuts, in Reel 3, of a closeup of a $50 bill, Reel 5, five scenes of testing of scaffold rope, vision of man shooting in silhouette, all but the first scene of officer pulling Sally away from bars to include closeup of hands, forcing her up scaffold stairs, three scenes of her on scaffold with hood over head to where lover appears.
