= The Gates of Eden =

1916 film by John H. Collins

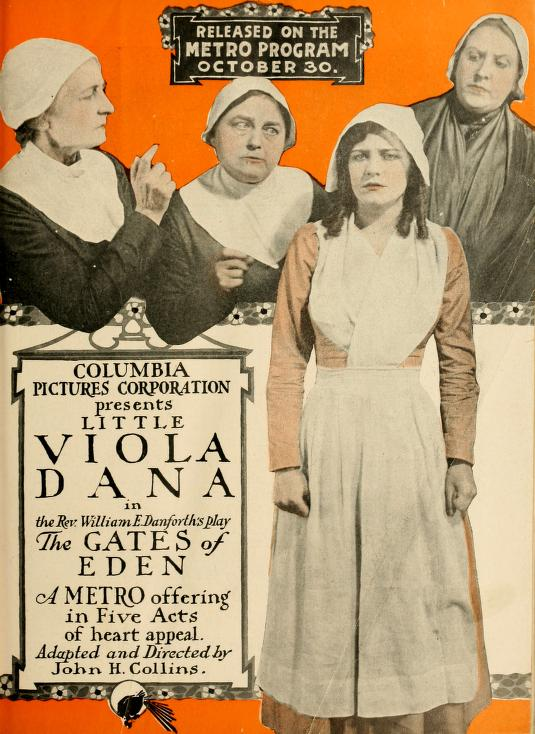
- film poster
- Directed by: John H. Collins
- Written by: Reverend William E. Danforth (story); John H. Collins (scenario)
- Starring: Viola Dana
- Cinematography: John Arnold
- Production company: Columbia Pictures Corporation
- Distributed by: Metro Pictures
- Release date: October 30, 1916
- Running time: 5 reels
- Country: US
- Language: Silent..(English intertitles)

The Gates of Eden is a lost 1916 silent drama film directed by John H. Collins and starring his wife Viola Dana. The Columbia Pictures Corporation, not related to the Hollywood studio, produced it, with release through Metro Pictures.

== Plot ==
Evelyn and William Bard live in a small Shaker community. Although the community forbids marriage and having children, the couple decide to marry and start a family. Their decision causes conflict with the other Shakers, who expel them from the community.

Before leaving, Evelyn gives birth to a daughter, Eve. Evelyn dies soon afterward, and the Shakers tell William that the child has also died. Believing that the community is responsible for the loss of his family, William leaves and vows to seek revenge on the Shakers.

== Cast ==
- Viola Dana as Eve/Evelyn
- Augustus Phillips as Joseph
- Robert Walker as William Bard
- Edward Earle as Rodney
- Grace Stevens as Eldress Sarah (*as Grace E. Stevens)
- Fred C. Jones as Huxley
- Harry Linson as Shaker Brother
- George D. Melville as Mr. Bard
