= The Winding Trail (1918 film) =

1918 silent western film

- Directed by: John H. Collins
- Screenplay by: H. P. Keeler (adaption)
- Story by: Katharine Kavanaugh; June Mathis
- Produced by: B. A. Rolfe
- Starring: Viola Dana; Clifford Bruce; Hayward Mack
- Cinematography: John Arnold
- Production companies: Metro Pictures; Yorke Film Corp.
- Release date: January 14, 1918 (US)
- Running time: 5 reels
- Country: United States
- Languages: Silent; English intertitles

The Winding Trail, also known by its working title of The Tiger Cat, is a 1918 American silent Western film directed by John H. Collins and starring Viola Dana, Clifford Bruce, and Hayward Mack. It was released on January 14, 1918.

== Cast ==
- Viola Dana as Audrey Graham
- Clifford Bruce as Zachary Wando
- Hayward Mack as Alvin Steele
- Mabel Van Buren as Lou

== Production ==
Under it's working title, The Tiger Cat, the film was shot on location in the Mojave Desert where an adobe house was constructed.
