= The Last Card =

1921 film

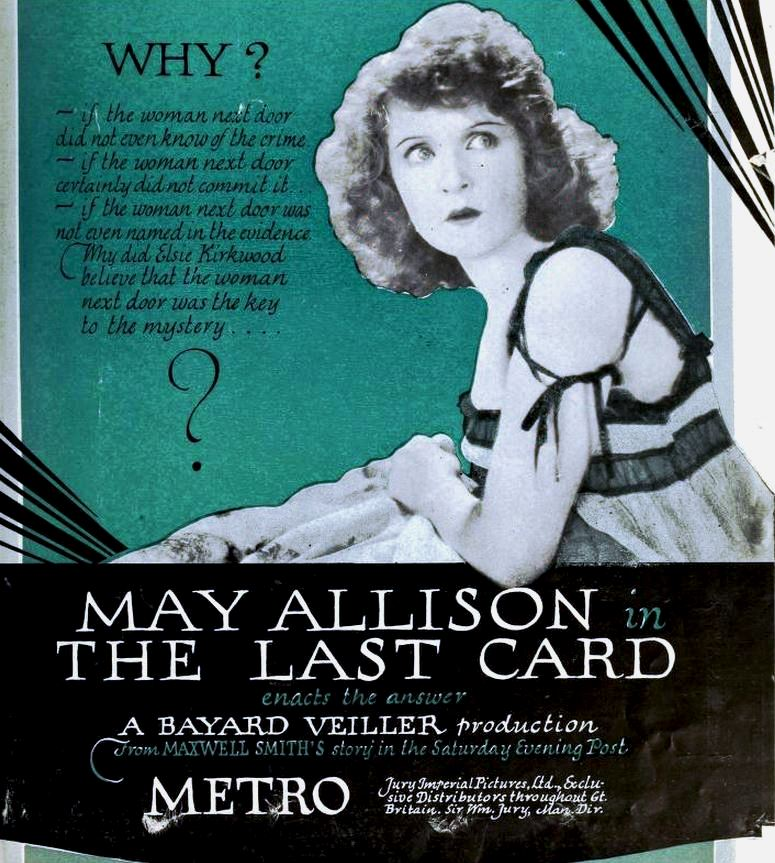
- Directed by: Bayard Veiller
- Written by: Mary O'Hara (scenario)
- Based on: story by Molly Parro
- Produced by: Bayard Veiller
- Starring: May Allison
- Production company: Metro Pictures
- Distributed by: Metro Pictures
- Release date: May 23, 1921
- Running time: 6 reels
- Country: United States
- Language: Silent (English intertitles)

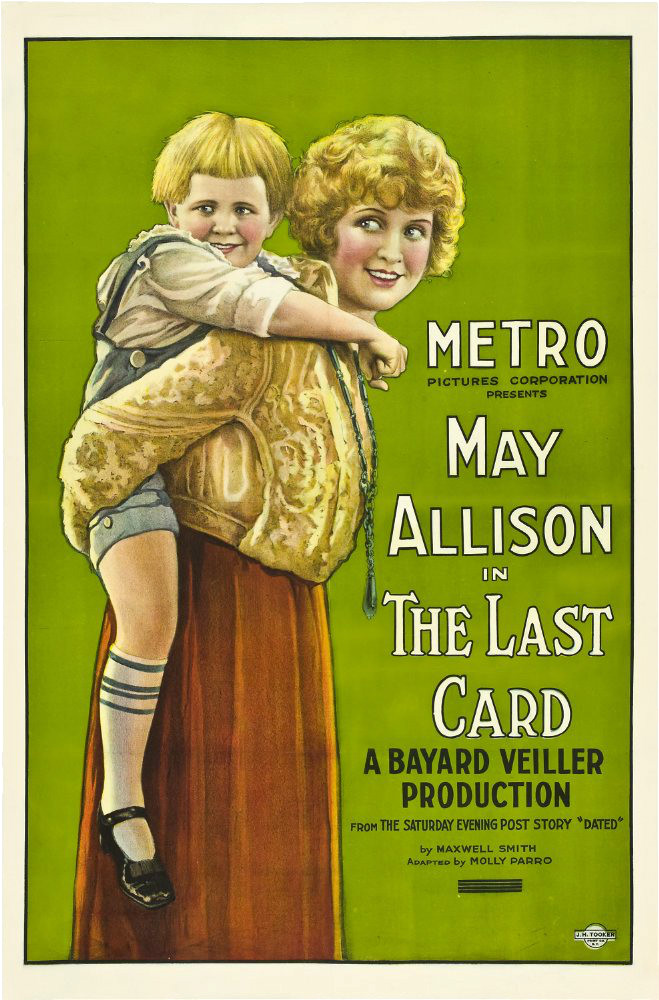
.

The Last Card is an extant 1921 American silent romantic drama film directed by Bayard Veiller and starring May Allison. It was produced and distributed by Metro Pictures to poor audience reception.

== Cast ==
- May Allison
- Alan Roscoe
- Stanley Goethals
- Frank Elliott
- Irene Hunt
- Dana Todd
- Wilton Taylor

== Preservation status ==
A 35 mm copy is held by the George Eastman Museum Motion Picture Collection.
