= The Flower of No Man's Land =

1916 film by John H. Collins

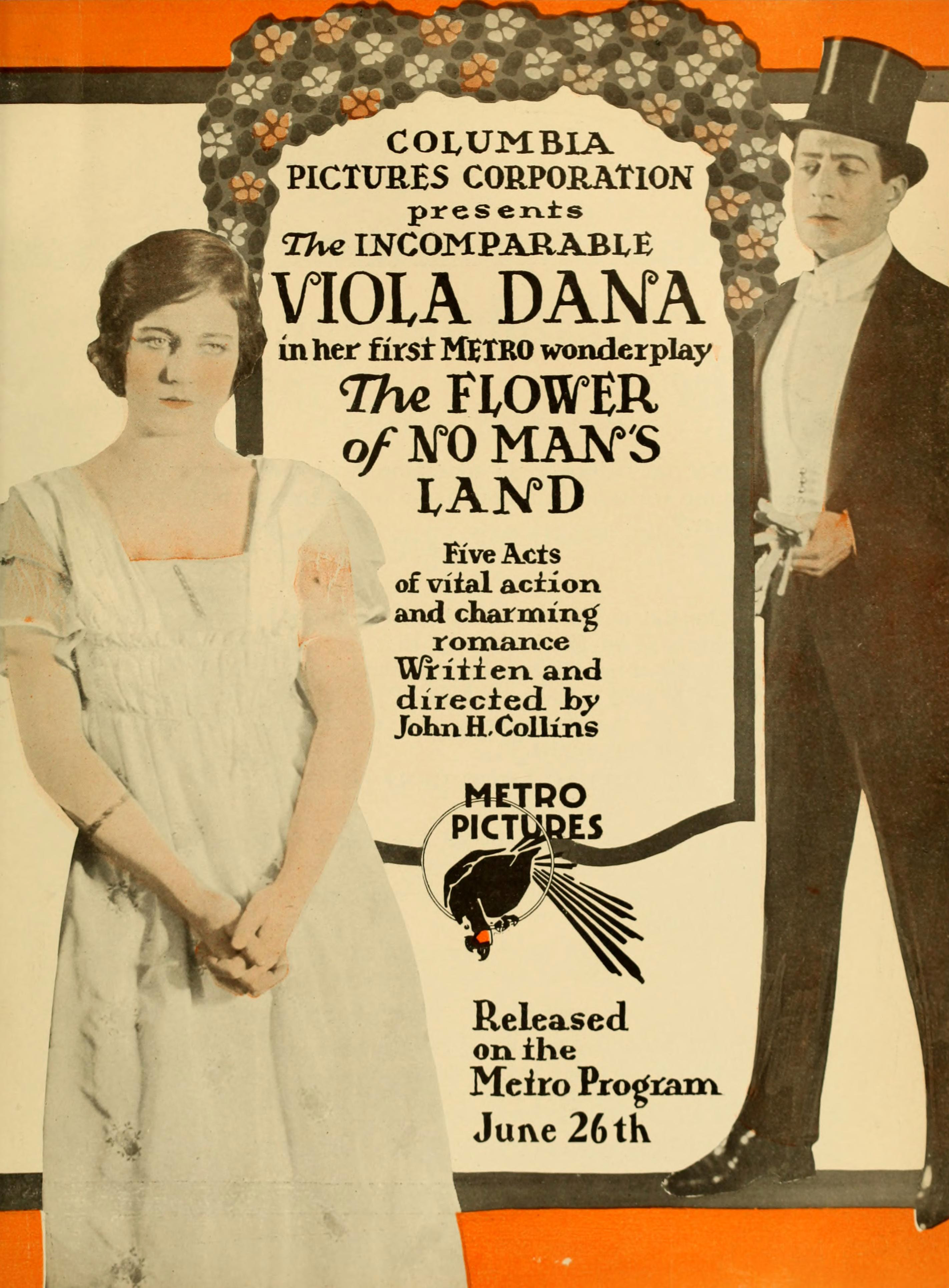
- Advertisement in The Moving Picture World
- Directed by: John H. Collins
- Written by: John H. Collins
- Starring: Viola Dana
- Cinematography: Mr. Berkeley
- Production company: Columbia Pictures Corporation
- Distributed by: Metro Pictures
- Release date: June 26, 1916
- Running time: 5 reels
- Country: USA
- Language: Silent..English

The Flower of No Man's Land is a lost 1916 silent film drama directed by John H. Collins and starring Viola Dana. It was distributed by Metro Pictures.

== Cast ==
- Viola Dana - Echo
- Duncan McRae - Roy Talbot
- Harry C. Browne - Big Bill
- Mitchell Lewis - Kahoma
- Fred Jones - Pedro
- Nellie G. Mitchell - Mrs. Talbot
- Eldine Steuart - Talbot child
- Marcus Moriarity - Potter the butler
