= God's Law and Man's =

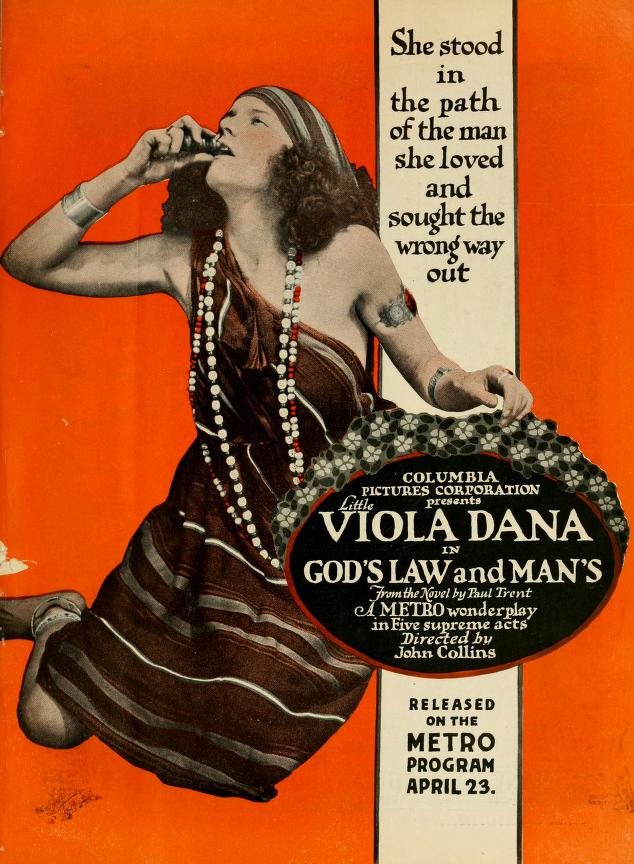
- Lobby poster
- Directed by: John H. Collins
- Written by: John H. Collins (scenario)
- Based on: A Wife by Purchase by Paul Trent
- Starring: Viola Dana
- Cinematography: John Arnold
- Production company: Columbia Pictures Corporation
- Distributed by: Metro Pictures
- Release date: April 23, 1917
- Running time: 5 reels
- Country: USA
- Language: Silent..(English intertitles)

God's Law and Man's is a lost 1917 silent film drama direct by John H. Collins and distributed by Metro Pictures. It starred Collins's wife Viola Dana. The story comes from a novel by Paul Trent, A Wife by Purchase.

== Cast ==
- Viola Dana - Ameia
- Robert Walker - Dr. Claude Drummond
- Augustus Phillips - Jack Aston
- Henry Hallam - Kunda Ram
- Frank Currier - Major General Dennison
- Marie Adell - Olive Dennison
- George A. Wright - Earl of Hetherington
- Floyd Buckley - Lord Charles Drummond
