= Seeing's Believing =

1922 film

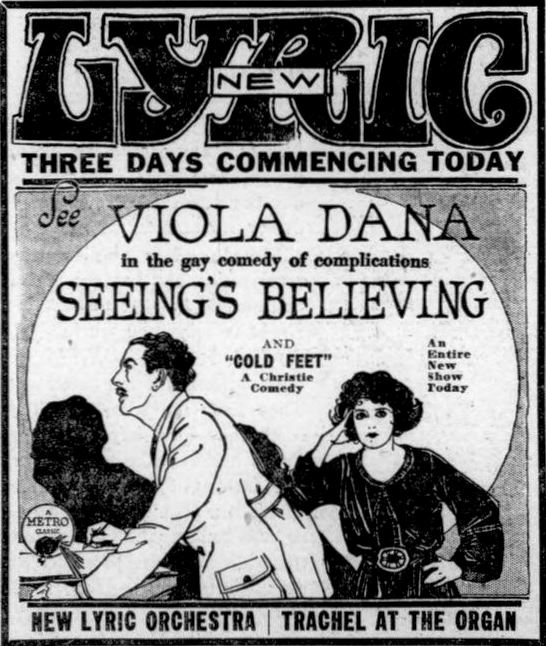
- Newspaper advertisement
- Directed by: Harry Beaumont
- Written by: Edith M. Kennedy
- Story by: Rex Taylor
- Starring: Viola Dana; Allan Forrest; Gertrude Astor
- Cinematography: John Arnold
- Production company: Metro Pictures
- Distributed by: Metro Pictures
- Release date: May 1, 1922
- Running time: 50 minutes
- Country: United States
- Language: Silent (English intertitles)

Seeing's Believing is a 1922 American silent comedy film directed by Harry Beaumont and starring Viola Dana, Allan Forrest, and Gertrude Astor.

== Plot ==
As described in a film magazine, Diana Webster (Dana), a willful young woman with plenty of money, and Jimmy Harrison (McCullough), her Aunt Sue's (Astor) fiancé, are forced to stay all night in a country hotel because of a storm. Getting a single room, they pretend they are married to satisfy the concerns of the hotel manager. Jimmy sleeps on a cot in the hall, but hotel guest Bruce Terring (Forrest) does not know this. Later, Bruce meets Diana at her home where he is a guest, and his scandalous interpretation of her escapade infuriates the young woman. She decides to teach him a lesson and show him that "seeing is not always believing" by placing him in a similar unusual position. She hires an actor and his wife to frame a badger game on Bruce. However, the couple double-cross her and Diana is forced into a blackmailing scheme which forces Bruce to rescue her, resulting in a snappy but happy ending for Bruce and Diana.

== Cast ==
- Viola Dana as Diana Webster
- Allan Forrest as Bruce Terring
- Gertrude Astor as Aunt Sue
- Philo McCullough as Jimmy Harrison
- Harold Goodwin as Hack Webster
- Edward Connelly as Henry Scribbins
- Josephine Crowell as Martha Scribbins
- Colin Kenny as Mr. Reed
- Grace Morse as Mrs. Reed
- J.P. Lockney as Sheriff

== Bibliography ==
- James Robert Parish & Michael R. Pitts. Film Directors: a Guide to their American Films. Scarecrow Press, 1974.
