= A Yellow Streak =

1915 film

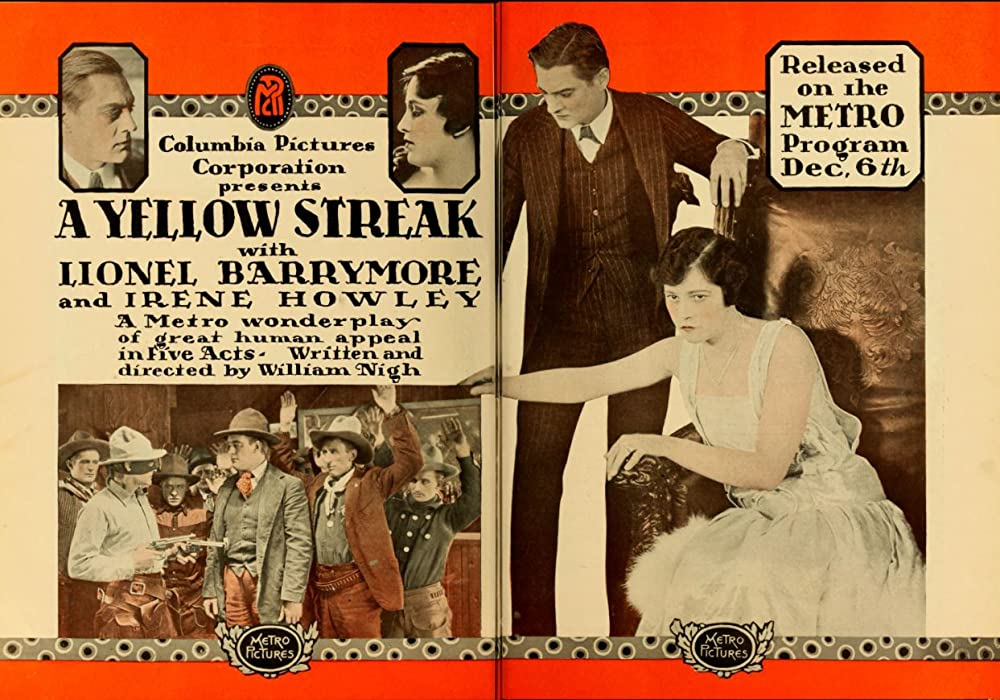
- Directed by: William Nigh
- Written by: William Nigh
- Starring: Lionel Barrymore; Irene Howley; Niles Welch
- Production company: Columbia Pictures
- Distributed by: Metro Pictures
- Release date: December 6, 1915
- Running time: 50 minutes
- Country: United States
- Languages: Silent; English intertitles

A Yellow Streak is a 1915 American silent Western film directed by William Nigh and starring Lionel Barrymore, Irene Howley and Niles Welch.

== Plot ==
After a Wall Street broker is ruined by his wife's lover, a business associated, he thinks of committing suicide off Brooklyn Bridge but instead heads to a western mining town.

== Cast ==
- Lionel Barrymore as Barry Dale
- Irene Howley as Mary Austin
- Dorothy Gwynne as Virginia Dale
- John Goldsworthy as Richard Marvin
- Niles Welch as Tom Austin
- R.A. Bresee as Parke Austin
- William Cowper as Tobias Rader
- William B. Davidson as Jack Rader
- Martin Faust as Outlaw
- John J. Donough as The Sky Pilot

== Bibliography ==
- Langman, Larry. A Guide to Silent Westerns. Greenwood Publishing Group, 1992.
- Nevins, Francis M. & Keller, Gary D. The Cisco Kid: American Hero, Hispanic Roots. Bilingual Press/Editorial Bilingüe, 2008.
