= Satan Junior =

1919 American silent film directed by John H. Collins

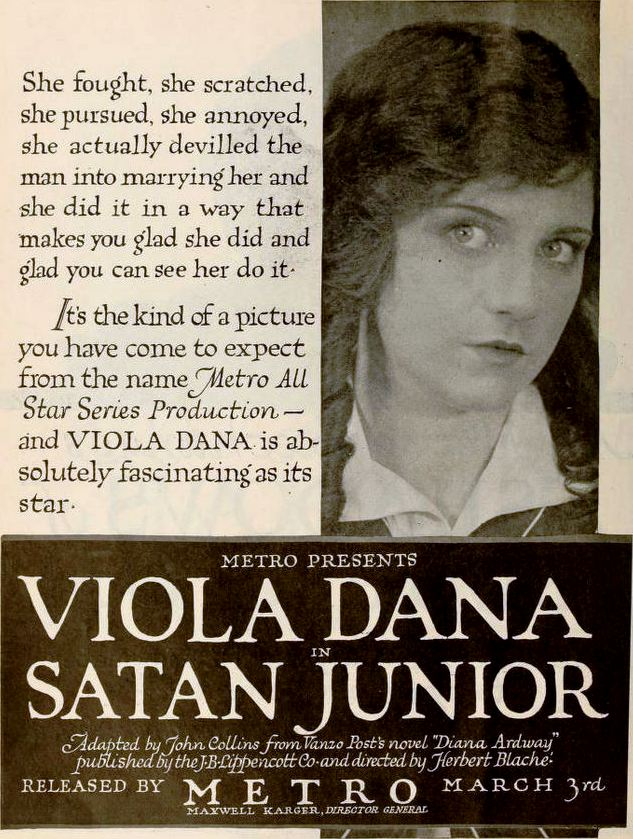
- Directed by: Herbert Blaché; John H. Collins
- Written by: John H. Collins; June Mathis
- Based on: the play, Diana Ardway by Van Zo Post
- Produced by: Maxwell Karger
- Starring: Viola Dana; Milton Sills; Lila Leslie
- Cinematography: John Arnold
- Production company: Metro Pictures
- Release date: March 3, 1919 (US)
- Running time: 5 reels
- Country: United States
- Language: English

Satan Junior is a 1919 American silent comedy film, directed by Herbert Blaché and John H. Collins. It was Collins' final involvement in film. Collins began directing the film, production of which had to be suspended due to the flu epidemic of 1918. Collins contracted the flu and died in 1918. When production resumed, Blaché took over directing duties. It stars Viola Dana (Collins' wife), Milton Sills, and Lila Leslie, and was released on March 3, 1919.

== Cast list ==
- Viola Dana as Diana Ardway
- Milton Sills as Paul Worden
- Lila Leslie as Marjorie Sinclair
- Frank Currier as Nathaniel Ardway
- Lloyd Hughes as Tad Worden
- George King as Juan-Kai
- Alice Knowland as Emmeline Ardway
