= The Fog (1923 film) =

1923 film by Paul Powell

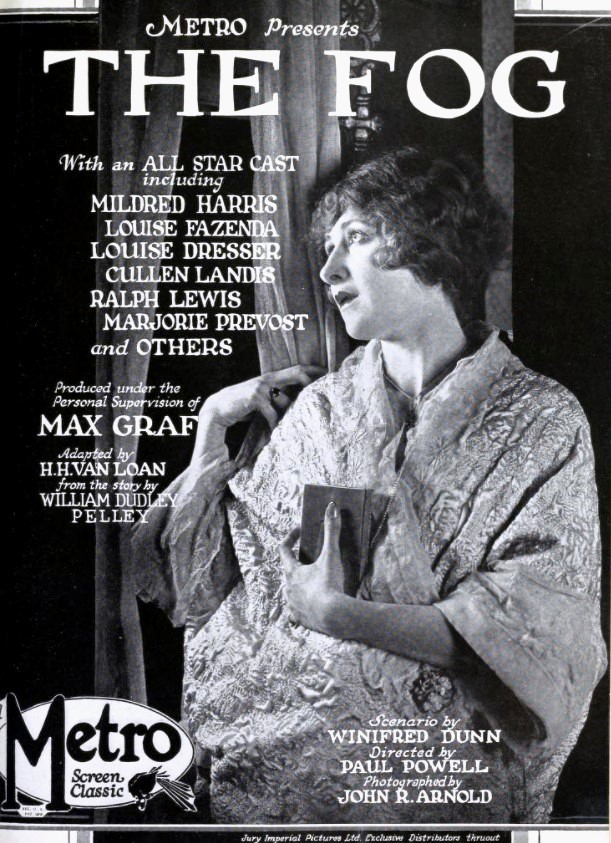
- Trade advertisement
- Directed by: Paul Powell
- Screenplay by: Winifred Dunn
- Story by: H. H. Van Loan
- Based on: The Fog by William Dudley Pelley
- Produced by: Max Graf
- Starring: Mildred Harris
- Cinematography: John Arnold
- Distributed by: Metro Pictures Corporation
- Release date: January 18, 1923
- Running time: 70 minutes
- Country: United States
- Language: Silent (English intertitles)

The Fog is a 1923 American silent drama film directed by Paul Powell and starring Mildred Harris. It was adapted from the novel of the same name by William Dudley Pelley.

A poster for this film was later featured in the Buster Keaton film Sherlock Jr. (1924).

== Cast ==
- Mildred Harris as Madelaine Theddon
- Louise Fazenda as Millie Richards
- Louise Dresser as Mrs. Theddon
- Marjorie Prevost as Edith Forge
- Ann May as Carol Gardner
- Ethel Wales as Mrs. Forge
- Cullen Landis as Nathan Forge
- Ralph Lewis as Jonathan Forge
- David Butler as Si Plumb
- Frank Currier as Caleb Gridley
- Eddie Phillips as Gordon Ruggles

== Production ==
The Fog was produced at the Graf studio in San Mateo with exteriors filmed in the San Francisco area. Casting was conducted in early 1923; Cullen Landis was the first to be cast.

== Preservation ==
The Fog is currently presumed lost. In February of 2021, the film was cited by the National Film Preservation Board on their Lost U.S. Silent Feature Films list.
