= The Upheaval =

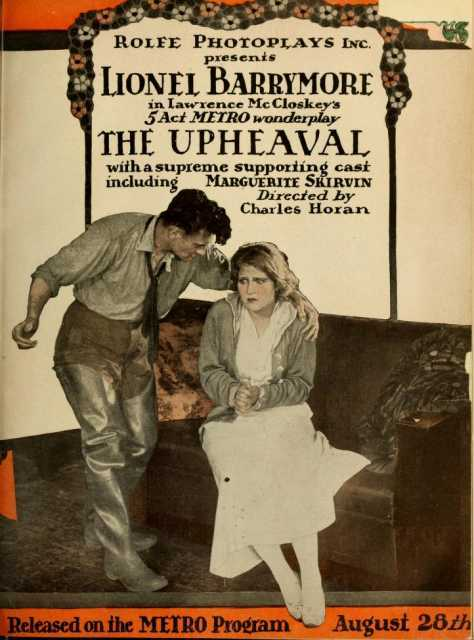
- Directed by: Charles Horan
- Written by: Lawrence McCloskey
- Produced by: Rolfe Photoplays
- Starring: Lionel Barrymore
- Cinematography: John Arnold
- Distributed by: Metro Pictures
- Release date: August 28, 1916
- Running time: 5 reels
- Country: United States
- Languages: Silent; English titles

The Upheaval is a 1916 silent film drama directed by Charles Horan and starring Lionel Barrymore. It was produced by B. A. Rolfe and distributed by Metro Pictures. It is based on a short story by Lawrence McCloskey The Upheaval.

A surviving copy of the film is at the George Eastman Museum.

== Cast ==
- Lionel Barrymore - Jim Gordon
- Marguerite Skirvin - Joan Madison
- Franklyn Hanna - Jim Gordon Sr. (as Franklin Hanna)
- Edgar L. Davenport - Henry Madison
- John Smiley - Benjamin Waters (as John H. Smiley)
- Paul Lawrence - Sidney Benson
- James C. Malaidy - Alec (as James Malaidy)
- Howard Truesdale - Myles McColl (Howard Truesdell)
- George Stevens - Jerome Hendricks
- Frank A. Lyons - Frank Wagner (Frank Lyons)
- Myra Brooks - Liza Poke (as Myra Brook)

== See also ==
- Lionel Barrymore on stage, screen and radio
