= The Gold Cure (1919 film) =

1919 silent film directed by John H. Collins

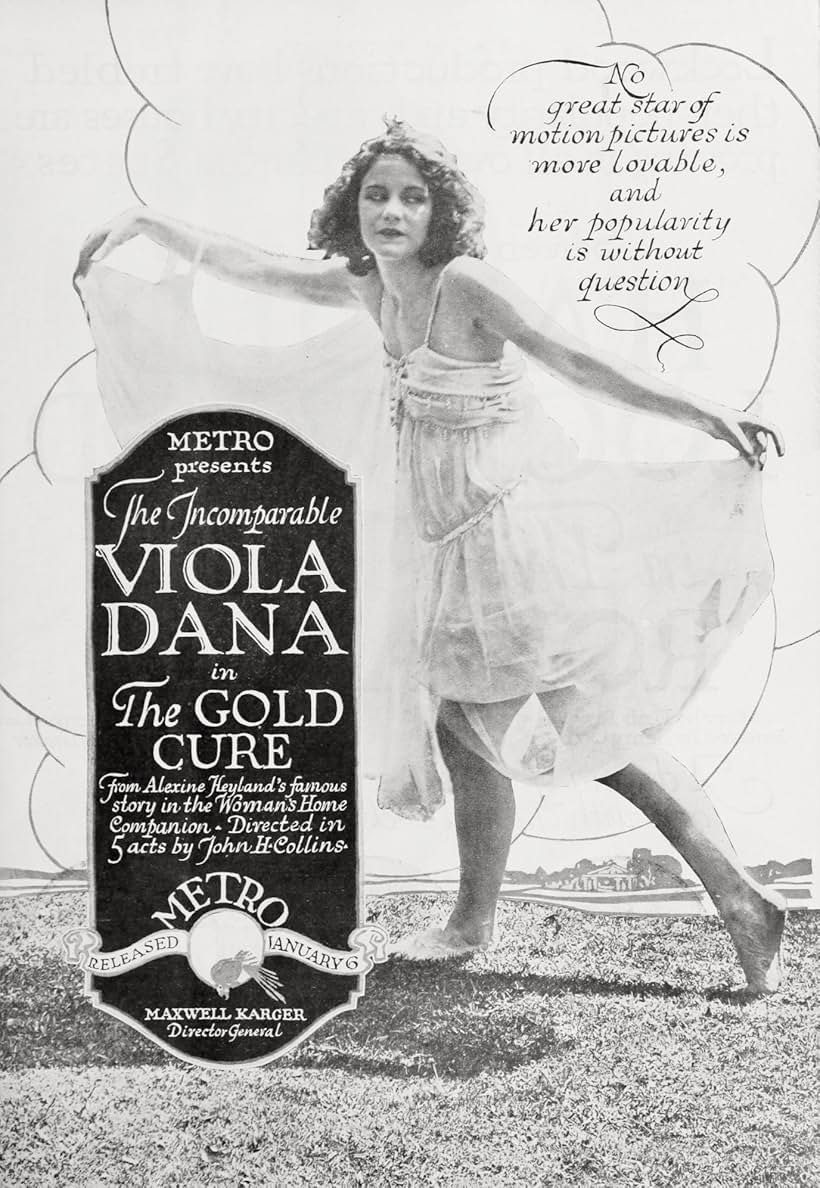
- Directed by: John H. Collins
- Written by: John H. Collins
- Based on: the short story, "Oh, Annice!" by Alexine Heyland
- Produced by: Maxwell Karger
- Starring: Viola Dana; John McGowan; Elsie MacLeod
- Cinematography: John Arnold
- Production company: Metro Pictures
- Release date: January 6, 1919 (US)
- Running time: 5 reels
- Country: United States
- Language: English

The Gold Cure is a 1919 American silent comedy film, directed by John H. Collins. It stars Viola Dana, John McGowan, and Elsie MacLeod, and was released on January 6, 1919.

== Cast list ==
- Viola Dana as Annice Paisch
- John McGowan as Vance Duncan
- Elsie MacLeod as Edna Lawson
- Howard Hall as Doctor Rodney Paisch
- Fred Jones as Robert Cord
- William B. Davidson as Michael Darcy
- Franklyn Hanna as Michael Connors
- Ed Mack as the gardener
- Julia Hurley as the gardener's wife
- George Dowling as Dr. Dumbbell
