= Life's Whirlpool =

Life's Whirlpool may refer to:

- Life's Whirlpool (1917 film), an American silent drama film
- Life's Whirlpool (1916 film), an American silent drama film
