= The Other Side of the Door =

The Other Side of the Door may refer to:

- The Other Side of the Door (1916 film), an American silent romantic drama film
- The Other Side of the Door (2016 film), a supernatural horror film
- The Other Side of the Door, a song by Taylor Swift from the album Fearless
