= John Arnold (cinematographer) =

American cinematographer (1889–1964)

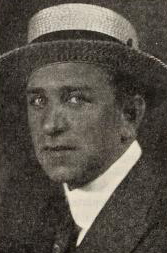
- John Arnold in 1922
- Born: November 16, 1889; New York City, New York, United States
- Died: January 11, 1964 (aged 74); Palm Springs, California, United States
- Occupation: Cinematographer
- Years active: 1914–1956

John Arnold (1889–1964) was an American cinematographer. He began his career in 1914, and in the next 15 years, he shot 86 films. He also worked in film administration, directing the cinematography department at MGM, and was president of the American Society of Cinematographers from 1931 through 1937, and again from 1939 to 1941. By 1938, he was regarded as one of the most authoritative experts on cinematography. He invented several pieces of camera equipment and was awarded two Oscars, both Technical Achievement Awards. The first was in 1938 for improvements on the semi-automatic follow focus device used on motion picture cameras, while the second was in 1940 for the development of the MGM mobile camera crane.

== Career ==
=== 1910s and 1920s ===
Arnold started his career with Republic Pictures in New York City (not to be confused with Republic Pictures) in 1910. Arnold's first film was 1914's Springtime, directed by Will S. Davis and starring Florence Nash, Adele Ray, and William H. Tooker. Filming took place on location in New Orleans, Louisiana and in St. Augustine, Florida. In July 1916, he began working for Metro Pictures, his first picture being The Quitter, starring Lionel Barrymore, Marguerite Skirvin, and Paul Everton, and was directed by Charles Horan. While at Metro, he became the personal cameraman for Viola Dana, shooting every film she appeared in for the studio. In November 1919, Arnold began a new fad among cameramen, when he began to wear moleskin pants. He felt that they had the dual purpose of keeping him warm in the winter and cool in the summer. Arnold was one of the charter members of the American Society of Cinematographers in 1919.

He continued at Metro throughout the 1910s and into the 1920s. In April 1922, he went over to Fox Films to shoot Very Truly Yours, directed by Harry Beaumont, before returning to Metro in May to film Viola Dana's next picture, Seeing's Believing. By 1922, he had filmed every single one of Viola Dana's pictures for Metro, and had helmed the camera for 47 films for Metro. Arnold, accompanied by his wife, went on location in February 1923 to shoot the film The Fog.

It is very seldom that the photography is praised in a poorly directed picture. The perfect picture results from close co-operation between the cameraman and the director.

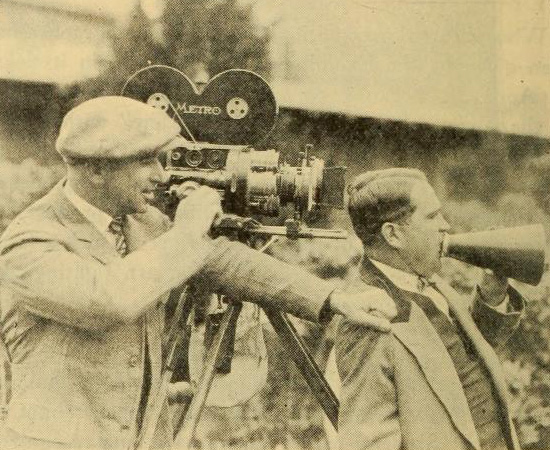
Arnold (left), with director Edward Cline on the set of the 1924 film, Along Came Ruth

In 1921, Arnold was elected to the board of governors of the American Society of Cinematographers. With the advent of sound pictures in the late 1920s, Arnold was chosen to sit on a panel of industry experts in the fields of film engineering, projection, and cinematography to discuss and establish screen proportions and other issues which arose with sound pictures. The experts were chosen from four organizations: the Motion Pictures Arts and Sciences technicians, the Society of Motion Picture Engineers, the American Projection Society, and the American Society of Cinematographers. Through 1925 Arnold shot every film Viola Dana was in at Metro. This ended with Dana's departure from Metro in 1925 in order to go freelance. After her departure, Arnold was given a long-term contract by MGM, where he had been since they opened their west coast studios in 1916. That year Arnold filmed The Big Parade, which won the Photoplay Magazine Medal for best film of the year. The medal is considered the first significant annual movie award, prior to the establishment of the Oscars. 1927 saw the development of the "Arnold light", an incandescent light which replaced the arc lights which was used prior. In 1929 Arnold invented a new type of "sound-proof" camera, to reduce the noise in filming sound productions. Its first use was in Lionel Barrymore's The Unholy Night, although Arnold was not the cinematographer on that film. In 1929 Arnold invented the "bungalow", a mobile camera covering which freed cameramen from the restrictive camera booths which were necessitated by sound film photography. 1929 would be Arnold's last year behind the camera. In 1930 he joined MGM's administration as head of their sound camera department, later to be called simply the camera department.

=== 1930s ===
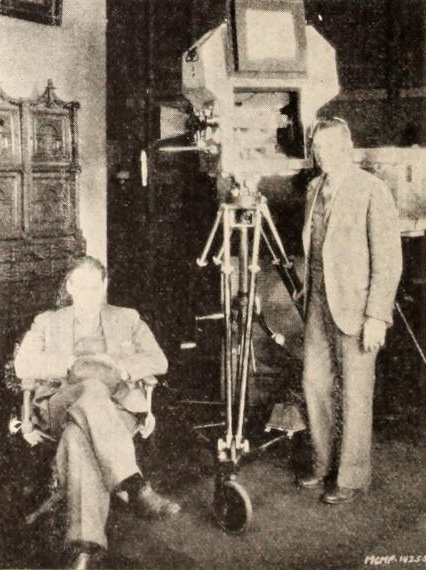
John Anderson (standing) with Lionel Barrymore on the set of the 1929 film, The Unholy Night, the housing around the camera is Arnold's invention, the "bungalow"

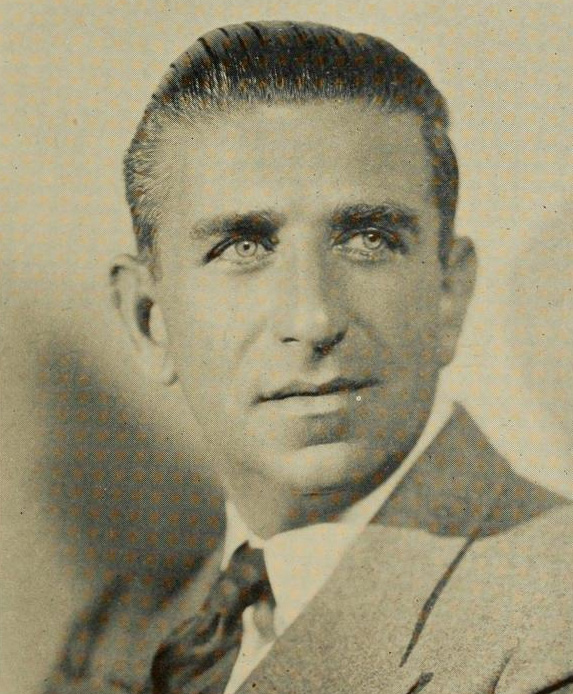
Arnold in 1931

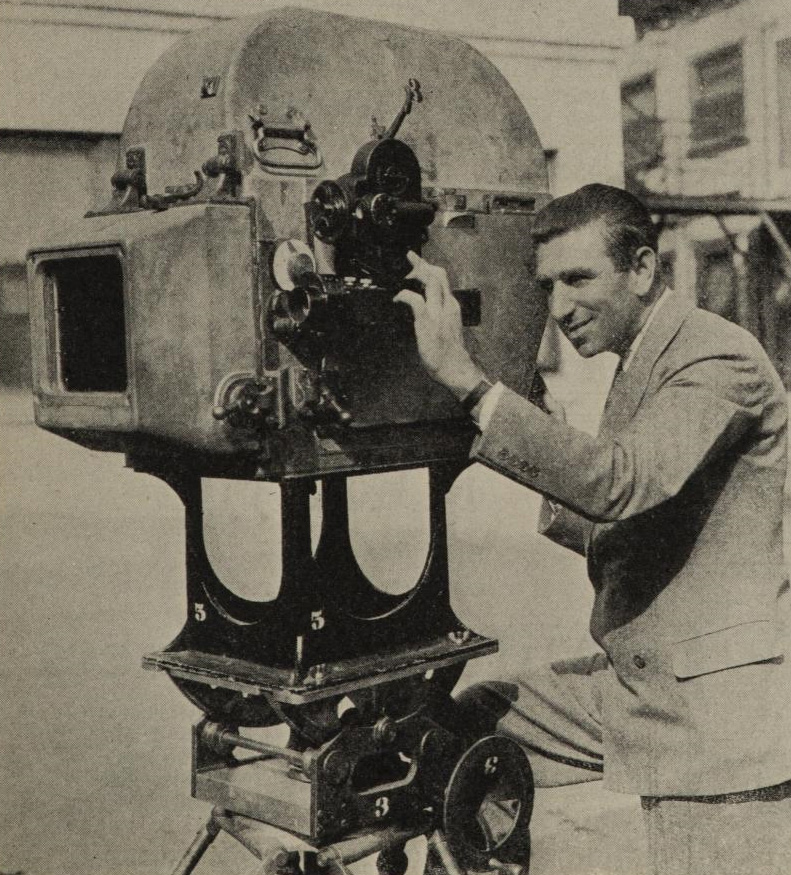
Arnold with his Filmo 16mm camera mounted next to his 35mm film camera, which is housed in his "bungalow" invention

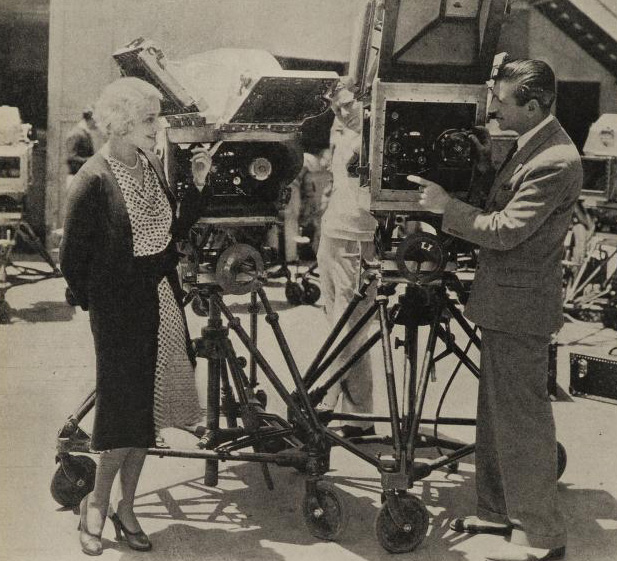
John Arnold explaining his new "blimp" to actress Leila Hyams in 1930

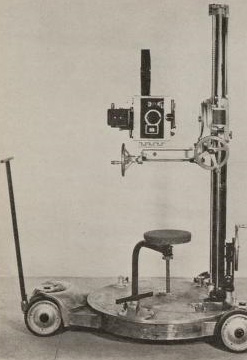
Arnold's rotambulator

Arnold was elected to his first term as president of the American Society of Cinematographers in 1931, a position he would hold through 1937. He had previously been the treasurer of the organization. During the year he became a major force in campaigning for Cinematographers to receive on-screen credit. In 1932, American Cinematographer, the official magazine of the American Society of Cinematographers, decided to run a contest for the best amateur film, offering a $1000 prize. Arnold was selected to be one of the judges. Late in 1932 Arnold was elected to the Technical Committee of the Motion Picture Academy (MPA). Also in 1932, Arnold oversaw the creation of a standard testing practice by the ASC, whereby they would test all technical moving and still equipment. Equipment which passed the test were eligible to use the "Approved by A.S.C." tag in their advertising. In the early 1930s, Arnold developed an attachment for the Mitchell Camera, which reduced the noise created during filming. It was a 48 cycle synchronous motor used to drive the camera, and it greatly reduced the vibration, and completely eradicated the noise of the motor. Along with a new version of the camera which was introduced in 1933, it was hailed as "...the greatest forward step in recent years." The combination of the new camera with the Arnold motor allowed the camera, without a hood (or blimp), to be used as close as a yard from the microphone. Another invention of Arnold's in the early 30s was a rolling tripod, which would be further refined by Mole-Richardson company, which gave it the name, the "Mole-Richardson rolling tripod". Arnold also invented the MGM camera crane, which was a substantial improvement over prior versions. it was about half the size of earlier versions, and 1/17 as heavy, as well as cutting costs by 90%. It elevated to 26 feet, weighed 3300 pounds, and cost $3,500. The crane could swing through a complete horizontal circle, while the arm could rotate 90 degrees. During this same period Arnold also designed the "rotambulator", a radically new design of camera dolly, which allowed a stable platform to move from about 18 inches off the floor to a height of eight feet. The operator could also rotate the entire assembly through a complete 360 degree circle. Arnold was also an avid 16mm camera fan, and would share his expertise with anyone who showed an interest. One of those he taught was Clark Gable. With the passage of the National Industrial Recovery Act of 1933, the National Recovery Administration was created, and part of its responsibilities included the creation of a motion picture code. At the hearing held in Washington D.C., Arnold was included as one of a long list of speakers who had requested to be heard. His attendance at the hearings in Washington caused him to miss the wedding of his good friend, Lee Garmes, for whom he was supposed to be the best man. By the end of 1933, Arnold's rotambulator was in use at several studios, replacing the tripods, dollies, and light cranes.

In 1935 Arnold invented a new type of camera blimp, decreasing the weight of the old model from 240 to 100 pounds, and including an automatic finder. Also in 1935 Arnold invented a mechanism which allowed film crews to drop "free heads" on large cameras. This lessened the uneven movement which existed on the cameras. In 1935, not only was he re-elected to the MPA's technical committee, but he was also elected to their Board of Governors, representing technicians.

By 1936 Arnold's title at MGM had become "executive director of photography." In 1936 Arnold developed two pieces of camera equipment which made it possible to better film operation on boats. Developed them for the film, Captains Courageous, they were called the "iron egg" and "the self-wiping windshield". The former was a weighted pendulum which hung from the bottom of the camera, acting as a counterweight and giving stability to the camera on a moving deck. The latter was a piece of plate glass which rotated very quickly, and with pressure plates to keep the glass free from water and spray. In 1937, Arnold decided not to run, due to potential conflicts of interest with his position at MGM, and was replaced by Victor Milner, who was elected in October 1937. After stepping down from the presidency, Arnold was awarded a "gold life card" by the ASC.

In 1938 Arnold contributed to the book, How We Make the Movies. The tome was an account of how movies were made, with each aspect of filmmaking covered by an authority in that field. It was "... designed for the general reader and for class room study in schools and colleges. Told in simple, informative and graphic style, the book covers the entire field, from the selection of the story, to the editing of the film." Arnold was asked to write the chapter on cinematography. At the Tenth Academy Awards in 1938 Arnold was awarded an Oscar for technical development for his work on the semi-automatic follow focus device used on motion picture cameras. Following his break in 1938, Arnold was elected once again to the presidency of the ASC in 1939, a post he would hold through 1941. Arnold developed the Ro Crane in 1939, which became the standard crane used at MGM in the 1940s and 1950s.

=== 1940s and 1950s ===
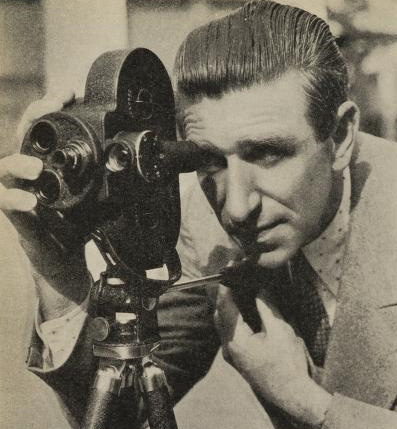
Arnold with his 16mm Filmo

Arnold won his second Oscar in 1940 for his development of the mobile camera crane. Also in 1940, he was re-elected as president of the American Society of Cinematographers. By the end of 1940 Arnold had been selected to serve on the MPAA's Production Defense Co-ordination Committee. That same year he was selected to sit on the board of the MPAA's Oscar committee for technical awards. 1940 also saw Arnold invent a new camera boom and dolly, considered a radical improvement at the time. The boom allowed the camera to film from ground level all the way to 16 feet. In 1941, while he remained on their Board of Governors, he was replaced as president by Fred Jackman. Arnold stepped down due to his increasing duties at MGM.

In 1941 he was appointed to a committee to discuss and standardize the use of 16mm equipment in the film industry. The committee was set up by the Research Council of the Academy of Motion Picture Arts and Sciences (AMPAS). In 1942 Arnold was again a member of an AMPAS committee, this one recommended changing the film speed from 24 to 18 frames per second. This would result in saving 35,000,000 feet of film each year. That same year, Arnold was selected to be the sole cinematography representative on the industry's War Activities Committee. In 1942 Arnold was one of a handful of cinematographers selected to train servicemen in the Signal Corps on how to take combat footage. By the end of 1943 he had trained over 350 men in the service.

In 1946, to help out fellow out cameraman (now working for him at MGM) Paul C. Vogel, who was working on the film Lady in the Lake, Arnold developed a special camera dolly which had four independent wheels. The film was shot from the POV of the protagonist, and the independent wheels allowed the camera to "walk" through doorways and upstairs, simulating natural movement. Arnold invented the Ro Boom, used by MGM in the 1940s. In 1948 he invented a new controller and motor for the boom. The new device allowed a single operator to move the boom at greater speeds. It had graduated speeds forwards and backwards, as well as dynamic braking through the motor. For the 1949 film Neptune's Daughter, Arnold oversaw the development of a combination camera elevator and crane, which allowed vertical travel shots, mid-air shots, and use of the camera anywhere from floor to ceiling without the need for extra equipment.

Arnold made another improvement to his Ro Crane in 1952, which allowed technicolor cameras to utilize the crane. He replaced the stationary base with a rotating one, which allowed the camera to have film installed on either side, which was necessary for the 3 negative rolls to occur. Arnold's contributions were not limited to camera equipment as back in the 1920s he had created the "Arnold light", an incandescent light to replace the older arc lights. In 1952 Arnold perfected a new lighting technique which utilized a new reflected type set, first utilized in the production, Scaramouche. For the 1952 film The Wild North, Arnold developed a camera heater which allowed cameras to film in very low temperatures. The heater could be adapted for any type of movie camera. Also in 1952, Arnold developed the jeep-mounted crane. He came up with the design to fill the need of his studio for rugged mobile transport to move cranes quickly from one location to the next. In October 1952 he was given an "Award of Fellow" from the Society of Motion Picture and Television Engineers. For the 1952 film, Julius Caesar, Arnold invented "skylight", an overhead lighting platform which used reflected light to produce shadowless lighting for indoor scenes. In 1953 Arnold invented a horizontal film travel camera, which was ahead of its time. It wasn't used by the studio until 1955, with the advent of 65mm. For the 1955 film Lust for Life, Arnold developed a process which allowed Van Gogh's paintings to be shot with better clarity than simply filming with a camera. Arnold served on the board of governors for the ASC from its inception in 1919 until 1955. In 1956, he was elected an alternate board member.

Arnold retired in 1956, after a career of 32 years with MGM, the last 26 of which were spent as head of MGM's camera department. Over the course of his career he invented hundreds of pieces of camera equipment. He was the only ASC member to serve 7 years as the organization's president. While head of the MGM camera department, Arnold was known for being a company man, requiring the cinematographers he supervised to use the glamorous cinematographic style MGM was known for, and coming down quite hard on those photographers who didn't want to conform to the MGM style.

== Filmography ==
(as per AFI's database)

Year	Title	Role	Production Co.	Distribution Co.
1914	Springtime	Cinematographer	Life Photo Film Corp.	Alco Film Corp.
1916	The Gates of Eden	Cinematographer	Columbia Pictures	Metro Pictures
1916	The Upheaval	Cinematographer	Rolfe Photoplays	Metro Pictures
1916	The Quitter	Cinematographer	Rolfe Photoplays	Metro Pictures
1916	The Cossack Whip	Cinematographer	Thomas A Edison, Inc	K-E-S-E Service
1917	Lady Barnacle	Cinematographer	Metro Pictures	Metro Pictures
1917	Blue Jeans	Cinematographer	Metro Pictures	Metro Pictures
1917	Aladdin's Other Lamp	Cinematographer	Rolfe Photoplays	Metro Pictures
1917	The Barricade	Cinematographer	Rolfe Photoplays	Metro Pictures
1917	The Girl Without a Soul	Cinematographer	Metro Pictures	Metro Pictures
1917	The Mortal Sin	Cinematographer	Columbia Pictures	Metro Pictures
1917	God's Law and Man's	Cinematographer	Columbia Pictures	Metro Pictures
1917	His Father's Son	Cinematographer	Rolfe Photoplays	Metro Pictures
1917	Rosie O'Grady	Cinematographer	Apollo Pictures	Art Dramas, Inc.
1917	Threads of Fate	Cinematographer	Columbia Pictures	Metro Pictures
1918	Riders of the Night	Cinematographer	Metro Pictures	Metro Pictures
1918	Opportunity	Cinematographer	Metro Pictures	Metro Pictures
1918	Flower of the Dusk	Cinematographer	Metro Pictures	Metro Pictures
1918	A Weaver of Dreams	Cinematographer	Metro Pictures	Metro Pictures
1918	The Winding Trail	Cinematographer	Metro Pictures	Metro Pictures
1918	Breakers Ahead	Cinematographer	Metro Pictures	Metro Pictures
1918	The Only Road	Cinematographer	Metro Pictures	Metro Pictures
1919	Satan Junior	Cinematographer	Metro Pictures	Metro Pictures
1919	The Parisian Tigress	Cinematographer	Metro Pictures	Metro Pictures
1919	Some Bride	Cinematographer	Metro Pictures	Metro Pictures
1919	The Gold Cure	Cinematographer	Metro Pictures	Metro Pictures
1919	Please Get Married	Cinematographer	Screen Classics	Metro Pictures
1919	The Microbe	Cinematographer	Metro Pictures	Metro Pictures
1919	False Evidence	Cinematographer	Metro Pictures	Metro Pictures
1920	The Chorus Girl's Romance	Cinematographer	Metro Pictures	Metro Pictures
1920	Cinderella's Twin	Cinematographer	Metro Pictures	Metro Pictures
1920	The Willow Tree	Cinematographer	Screen Classics	Metro Pictures
1920	Blackmail	Cinematographer	Screen Classics	Metro Pictures
1920	Dangerous to Men	Cinematographer	Screen Classics	Metro Pictures
1921	There Are No Villains	Director of Photography	Metro Pictures	Metro Pictures
1921	Life's Darn Funny	Cinematographer	Metro Pictures	Metro Pictures
1921	The Match-Breaker	Director of Photography	Metro Pictures	Metro Pictures
1921	The Off-Shore Pirate	Director of Photography	Metro Pictures	Metro Pictures
1921	Puppets of Fate	Director of Photography	Metro Pictures	Metro Pictures
1922	Very Truly Yours	Director of Photography	Fox Films	Fox Films
1922	They Like 'Em Rough	Director of Photography	Metro Pictures	Metro Pictures
1922	Seeing's Believing	Director of Photography	Metro Pictures	Metro Pictures
1922	June Madness	Director of Photography	Metro Pictures	Metro Pictures
1922	The Fourteenth Lover	Director of Photography	Metro Pictures	Metro Pictures
1922	Love in the Dark	Director of Photography	Metro Pictures	Metro Pictures
1922	Glass Houses	Director of Photography	Metro Pictures	Metro Pictures
1922	The Five Dollar Baby	Director of Photography	Metro Pictures	Metro Pictures
1923	The Social Card	Director of Photography	Metro Pictures	Metro Pictures
1923	In Search of a Thrill	Director of Photography	Metro Pictures	Metro Pictures
1923	Her Fatal Millions	Director of Photography	Metro Pictures	Metro Pictures
1923	The Fog	Cinematographer	Max Graf Productions	Metro Pictures
1923	A Noise in Newboro	Director of Photography	Metro Pictures	Metro Pictures
1923	Rouged Lips	Director of Photography	Metro Pictures	Metro Pictures
1923	Crinoline and Romance	Cinematographer	Metro Pictures	Metro Pictures
1924	Revelation	Cinematographer	Metro-Goldwyn Pictures	Metro-Goldwyn Pictures
1924	So This Is Marriage	Cinematographer	Metro-Goldwyn Pictures	Metro-Goldwyn Pictures
1924	Wife of the Centaur	Director of Photography	Metro-Goldwyn Pictures	Metro-Goldwyn Pictures
1924	Sinners in Silk	Cinematographer	Metro-Goldwyn-Mayer	Metro-Goldwyn-Mayer
1924	A Heart Bandit	Director of Photography	Metro-Goldwyn Pictures	Metro-Goldwyn Pictures
1924	The Beauty Prize	Director of Photography	Metro-Goldwyn Pictures	Metro-Goldwyn Pictures
1924	Along Came Ruth	Director of Photography	Metro-Goldwyn Pictures	Metro-Goldwyn Pictures
1924	Don't Doubt Your Husband	Cinematographer	Metro-Goldwyn Pictures	Metro-Goldwyn Pictures
1925	The Way of a Girl	Director of Photography	Metro-Goldwyn Pictures	Metro-Goldwyn Pictures
1925	Proud Flesh	Director of Photography	Metro-Goldwyn Pictures	Metro-Goldwyn Pictures
1925	The Big Parade	Cinematographer	Metro-Goldwyn Pictures	Metro-Goldwyn Pictures
1925	Sun-Up	Director of Photography	Metro-Goldwyn-Mayer	Metro-Goldwyn-Mayer
1925	Sally, Irene and Mary	Director of Photography	Metro-Goldwyn-Mayer	Metro-Goldwyn-Mayer
1925	Bright Lights	Director of Photography	Metro-Goldwyn-Mayer	Metro-Goldwyn-Mayer
1926	Paris	Director of Photography	Metro-Goldwyn-Mayer	Metro-Goldwyn-Mayer
1926	Love's Blindness	Director of Photography	Metro-Goldwyn-Mayer	Metro-Goldwyn-Mayer
1926	Dance Madness	Director of Photography	Metro-Goldwyn-Mayer	Metro-Goldwyn-Mayer
1926	The Auction Block	Director of Photography	Metro-Goldwyn-Mayer	Metro-Goldwyn-Mayer
1926	The Fire Brigade	Director of Photography	Metro-Goldwyn-Mayer	Metro-Goldwyn-Mayer
1927	The Understanding Heart	Director of Photography	Cosmopolitan Productions	Metro-Goldwyn-Mayer
1927	The Show	Director of Photography	Metro-Goldwyn-Mayer	Metro-Goldwyn-Mayer
1927	Mr. Wu	Cinematographer	Metro-Goldwyn-Mayer	Metro-Goldwyn-Mayer
1927	Heaven on Earth	Director of Photography	Metro-Goldwyn-Mayer	Metro-Goldwyn-Mayer
1927	Becky	Director of Photography	Cosmopolitan Productions	Metro-Goldwyn-Mayer
1928	Show People	Director of Photography	Metro-Goldwyn-Mayer	Metro-Goldwyn-Mayer
1928	The Wind	Cinematographer	Metro-Goldwyn-Mayer	Metro-Goldwyn-Mayer
1928	Rose-Marie	Director of Photography	Metro-Goldwyn-Mayer	Metro-Goldwyn-Mayer
1928	The Garden of Eden	Cinematographer	Feature Productions	United Artists
1928	Detectives	Director of Photography	Metro-Goldwyn-Mayer	Metro-Goldwyn-Mayer
1928	The Cardboard Lover	Director of Photography	Cosmopolitan Productions	Metro-Goldwyn-Mayer
1929	The Hollywood Revue of 1929	Director of Photography	Metro-Goldwyn-Mayer	Metro-Goldwyn-Mayer
1928	The Broadway Melody	Director of Photography	Metro-Goldwyn-Mayer	Metro-Goldwyn-Mayer

== Personal life ==
In February 1920, Arnold moved to Hollywood, where he purchased a new home. In 1923 his police dog, named Pal Baron Von Matinhoff, won the gold medal at the Los Angeles Kennel Club's annual dog show. On May 12, 1935, he became the father of a son.
