= The Girl Without a Soul =

1917 film directed by John H. Collins

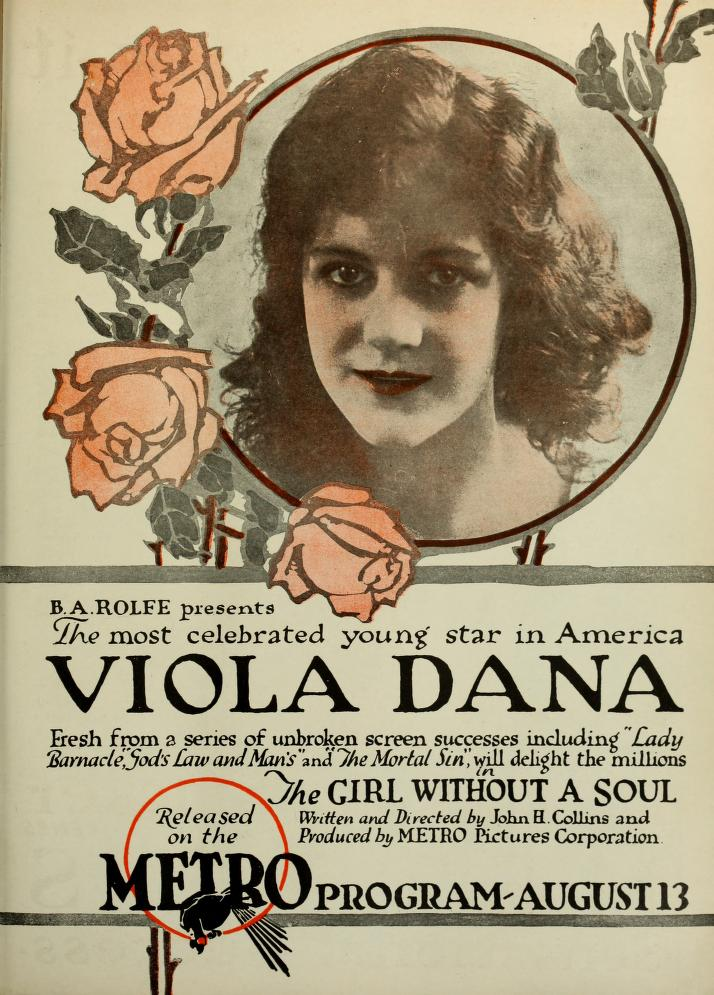
- Advertisement in the August 18, 1917 issue of The Moving Picture World for film
- Directed by: John H. Collins
- Written by: John H. Collins
- Produced by: B.A. Rolfe
- Starring: Viola Dana; Robert D. Walker; Fred C. Jones
- Cinematography: John Arnold
- Production company: Metro Pictures
- Distributed by: Metro Pictures
- Release date: August 13, 1917
- Running time: 5 reels (approximately 50 minutes)
- Country: United States
- Language: Silent (English intertitles)

The Girl Without a Soul is a 1917 American silent drama film featuring Viola Dana in a dual role as sisters.

The film was produced by B.A. Rolfe and shot in the Fort Lee, New Jersey area. Rolfe moved his production company Rolfe Photoplays west to Hollywood in the wake of the 1918 influenza epidemic, but not before director Collins fell victim and died in a New York hotel room in October of that year.

An original film print is preserved complete at the George Eastman House Motion Picture Collection in New York. In 2018, the film was selected for preservation in the United States National Film Registry by the Library of Congress as being "culturally, historically, or aesthetically significant."

== Plot ==
As described in a film magazine, Priscilla and Unity Beaumont (Dana) are as different as night and day. Priscilla longs for a career on the concert stage, while Unity is the family drudge. Ivor (Jones), a Russian violinist, persuades Priscilla to steal some money from the village blacksmith Hiram Miller (Walker), which he was holding in trust to purchase a new church organ. Unity, who is in love with Hiram, learns of the location of the money and restores it to the church during the trial of Hiram. Hiram is freed of the charge, and Priscilla learns that Ivor is but a deceiver.

== Cast ==
- Viola Dana as Unity Beaumont / Priscilla Beaumont
- Robert D. Walker as Hiram Miller
- Fred C. Jones as Ivor
- Henry Hallam as Dominic Beaumont
- Margaret Seddon as Henrietta Hateman
- Margaret Vaughan as Louise

== Reception ==
Like many American films of the time, The Girl Without a Soul was subject to cuts by city and state film censorship boards. The Chicago Board of Censors cut a scene with money being taken from a tin box, the intertitle "You had better remain here and go away tomorrow," and a vision of the girl taking money from the tin box.
