= Her Fatal Millions =

1923 film by William Beaudine

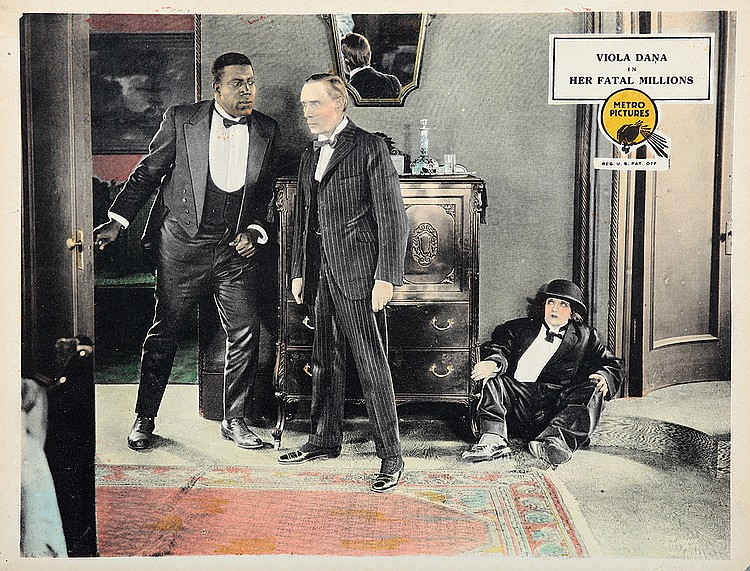
- Directed by: William Beaudine
- Written by: William Dudley Pelley (story); Arthur F. Statter (adaptation)
- Produced by: Metro Pictures
- Starring: Viola Dana
- Cinematography: John Arnold
- Distributed by: Metro Pictures
- Release date: April 9, 1923
- Country: United States
- Language: Silent (English intertitles)

Her Fatal Millions is a 1923 American Metro Pictures silent comedy film directed by William Beaudine. It stars Viola Dana, Huntley Gordon, and Allan Forrest. It is not known if the film currently survives, which suggests that it is a lost film.

== Cast ==
- Viola Dana as Mary Bishop
- Huntley Gordon as Fred Garrison
- Allan Forrest as Lew Carmody
- Peggy Browne as Louise Carmody
- Edward Connelly as Amos Bishop
- Kate Price as Mary Applewin
- Joy Winthrop as the Landlady
