= Lady Barnacle =

1917 silent film directed by John H. Collins

- Directed by: John H. Collins
- Written by: June Mathis
- Based on: the short story, "Lady Barnacle" by Edgar Franklin
- Starring: Viola Dana; Robert Walker; Augustus Phillips
- Cinematography: John Arnold
- Production company: Metro Pictures
- Release date: June 4, 1917 (US)
- Running time: 5 reels
- Country: United States
- Language: English

Lady Barnacle is a 1917 American silent comedy film, directed by John H. Collins. It stars Viola Dana, Robert Walker, and Augustus Phillips, and was released on June 4, 1917.

== Cast list ==
- Viola Dana as Lakshima
- Robert Walker as George Morling
- Augustus Phillips as Maharajah Bhartari-Hari Pal Singh
- William B. Davidson as Krishna Dhwaj
- Henry Hallam as John Morling
- Marie Adell as Mary Fanning
- Fred Jones as Asoka-Kuhan-Ray
- Henry Leone as Nizam of Bandorporia
- Ricca Allen as Anne Marble
- Harry Linson as Rev. Enoch T. Fanning
- Gerald Griffin as Capt. O'Malley
- Nellie Grant as Lakshima's maid
