= A Noise in Newboro =

1923 film

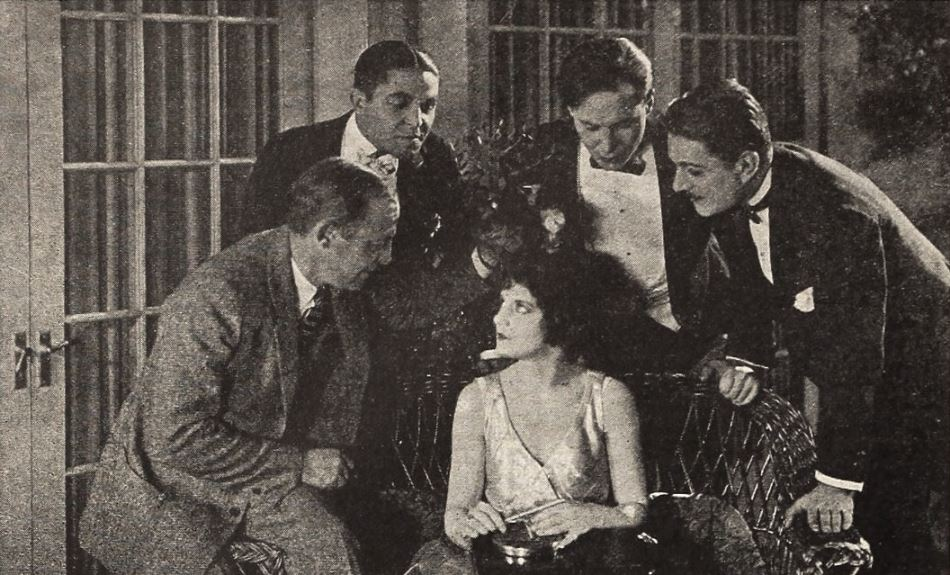
- Directed by: Harry Beaumont
- Written by: Edgar Franklin; Rex Taylor
- Starring: Viola Dana; David Butler; Eva Novak
- Cinematography: John Arnold
- Production company: Metro Pictures
- Distributed by: Metro Pictures
- Release date: November 29, 1923
- Country: United States
- Languages: Silent; English intertitles

A Noise in Newboro is a 1923 American silent comedy film directed by Harry Beaumont and starring Viola Dana, David Butler and Eva Novak.

== Cast ==
- Viola Dana as Martha Mason
- David Butler as Ben Colwell
- Eva Novak as Anne Paisley
- Allan Forrest as Buddy Wayne
- Betty Francisco as Leila Wayne
- Alfred Allen as Eben Paisley
- Malcolm McGregor as Harry Dixon
- Joan Standing as Dorothy Mason
- Bert Woodruff as 'Dad' Mason

== Bibliography ==
- Kenneth MacKinnon. Hollywood's small towns: an introduction to the American small-town movie. Scarecrow Press, 1984.
