= The Mortal Sin =

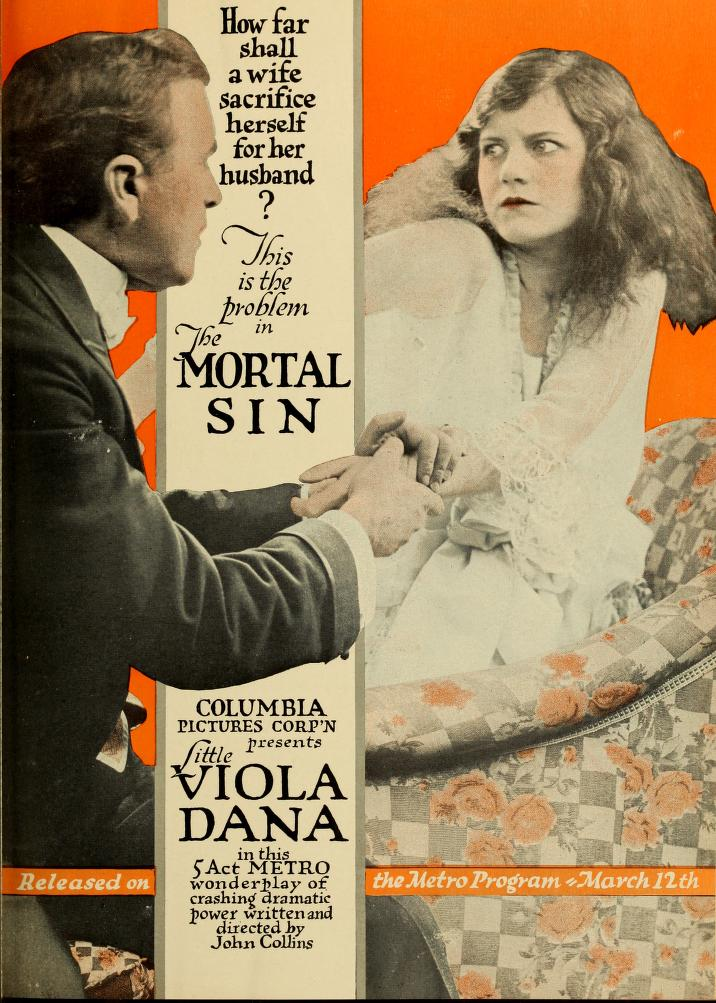
- Advertisement
- Directed by: John H. Collins
- Written by: John H. Collins
- Starring: Viola Dana
- Cinematography: John Arnold
- Production company: Columbia Pictures Corporation
- Distributed by: Metro Pictures
- Release date: March 12, 1917
- Running time: 5 reels
- Country: United States
- Language: Silent (English intertitles)

The Mortal Sin is a lost 1917 silent film drama directed by John H. Collins and distributed by Metro Pictures. Viola Dana, at the time Collins's wife, stars in the picture.

== Plot ==
Author George Anderson is toiling on his latest work, The Mortal Sin, a novel about a husband and wife grappling over how to handle the husband's case of tuberculosis in an effort to save his life. Throughout the film, similar elements of the novel's plot begin to appear in George's own life, including his own threatening illness, potential infidelity within the relationship, and what seems to be the murder of his own wife.

== Cast ==
- Viola Dana - Jane Anderson
- Robert Walker - George Anderson
- Augustus Phillips - Emmet Standish
- Lady Thompson - Flora
- Henry Leone - Jean Rambeau
- Louis B. Foley - The Doctor
- Ricca Allen - Landlady
