= The New Janitor =

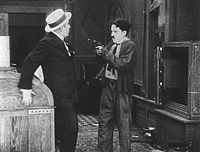
- Scene with Dillon and Chaplin
- Directed by: Charlie Chaplin
- Produced by: Mack Sennett
- Starring: Charlie Chaplin; Jess Dandy; John T. Dillon; Al St. John
- Cinematography: Frank D. Williams
- Production company: Keystone Studios
- Distributed by: Mutual Film
- Release date: September 24, 1914
- Running time: 16 minutes
- Country: United States
- Languages: Silent; English (intertitles)

The New Janitor (1914)

The New Janitor is a 1914 film from Keystone Studios, and is the 27th comedy to feature Charlie Chaplin. The film is arguably one of his best for the studio, and a precursor to a key Essanay Studios short, The Bank. The film also demonstrates the differences that Chaplin had with Keystone comedy in that it is a coherent whole in which the stock characters actually fill some emotional center. Chaplin brings a certain complexity to his janitor, unusual to the comedy factory of Mack Sennett. The film, which stars among Sennett's bit players Jess Dandy, Al St. John, John T. Dillon, and Helen Carruthers, is far more centered and clear in direction. Comedy mostly flows from the core of the story instead of being a by-product of it. After all this is a typical bank robbery storyline.

== Plot ==
The Tramp, a janitor in this film, is fired from work for accidentally knocking his bucket of water out of the window and onto his boss, the chief banker. Meanwhile, one of the junior managers is being threatened with exposure by his bookie for his unpaid gambling debts, and thus decides to steal from the company. He is caught in the act of raiding the vault by the bank secretary, who is threatened with a gun and therefore presses the janitor button for help. The Tramp comes to the rescue and gets hold of the manager’s gun, only to be misjudged by the chief banker and a policeman as the thief. The secretary explains the truth to the chief banker. In the end the manager is arrested and the Tramp is rewarded by the chief banker for his heroic act.

== Cast ==
- Charlie Chaplin – Janitor
- Jess Dandy – Bank president
- John T. Dillon – Villainous manager
- Al St. John – Elevator boy
- Helen Carruthers – Bank secretary

== Reception ==
Moving Picture World commented, "...A ripping good comedy number with Chas. Champman [sic] playing the part of the janitor. He interpolates a lot of his inimitable funny business and the plot is better than usual."

Motion Picture News also got Chaplin's surname wrong in its review: "The comical Charles Chapman [sic] in a laughable farce that will arouse peals of laughter from any audience."

== Censorship ==
The Chicago Board of Censors cut out the scenes of the villainous manager threatening the secretary with a gun, her being knocked down, taking money from the safe, and shortening the scene of struggle.
