= Viola Dana =

American actress (1897–1987)

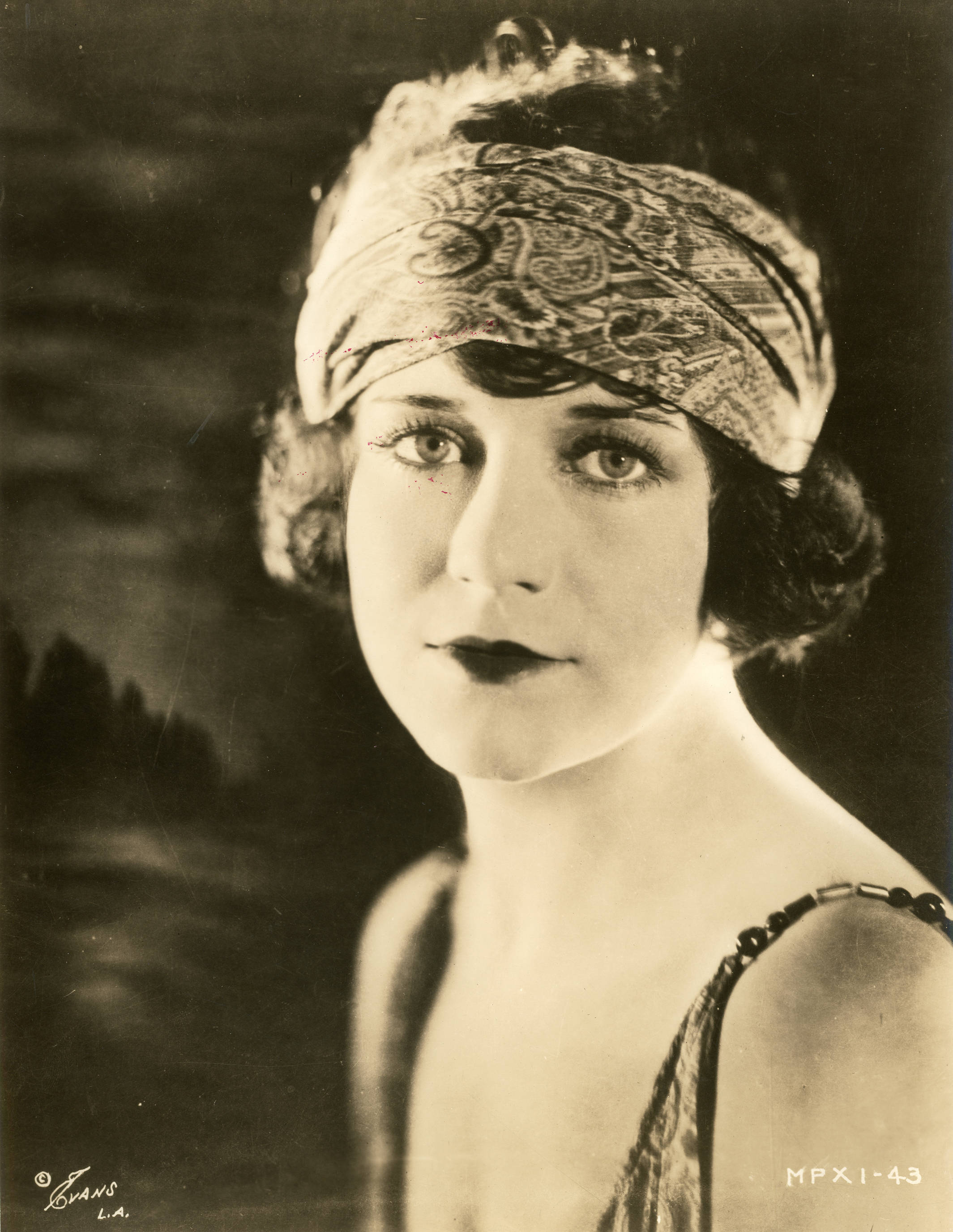
- Dana in 1922
- Born: Virginia Flugrath; June 26, 1897; Brooklyn, New York City, New York, U.S.
- Died: July 3, 1987 (aged 90); Woodland Hills, Los Angeles, California, U.S.
- Resting place: Hollywood Forever Cemetery
- Years active: 1900–1933
- Spouses: John H. Collins (m. 1915; died 1918) Maurice "Lefty" Flynn (m. 1925; div. 1929) Jimmy Thomson (m. 1930; div. 1945)
- Relatives: Edna Flugrath (sister); Shirley Mason (sister)

Viola Dana (born Virginia Flugrath; June 26, 1897 – July 3, 1987) was an American film actress during the silent film era. She appeared in over 100 films, but was unable to make the transition to sound films.

== Early life ==
Born Virginia Flugrath on June 26, 1897, in Brooklyn, New York City, where she was raised, she was the middle sister of three siblings who all became actresses. Her sisters were known as Edna Flugrath and Shirley Mason. Dana appeared (billed as Viola Dana) in the Broadway play The Poor Little Rich Girl by Eleanor Gates.

She began performing in vaudeville with Dustin Farnum in The Little Rebel and played a bit part in The Model by Augustus Thomas.

== Film career ==
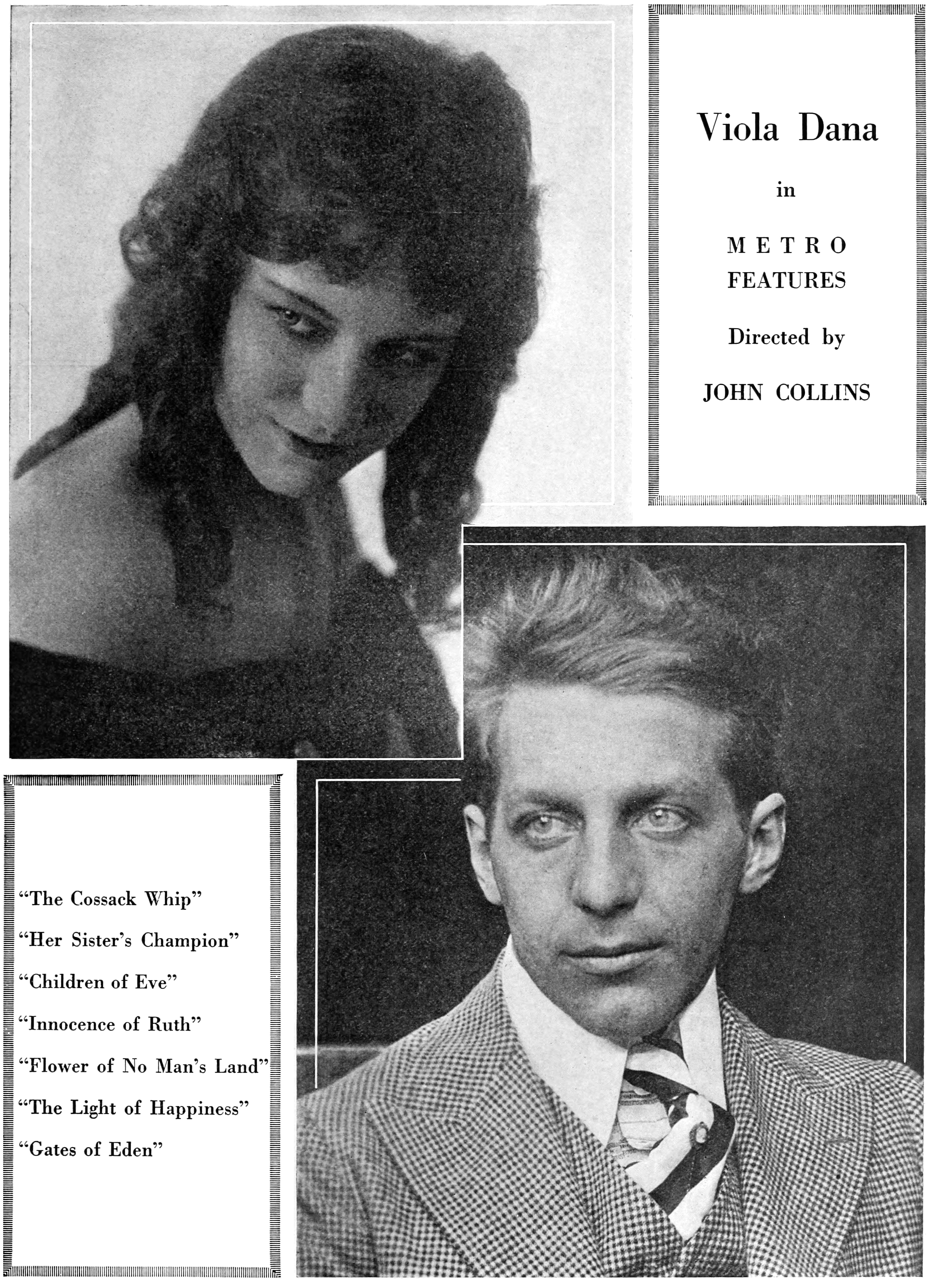
Metro Pictures advertisement for the filmmaking team of Viola Dana and John H. Collins (1916)

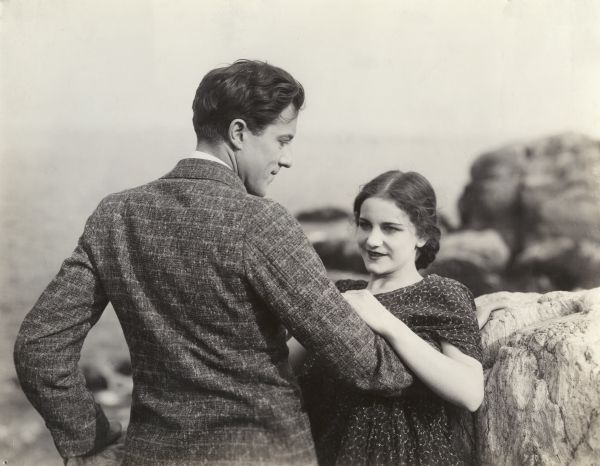
Robert D. Walker and Dana in still for Aladdin's Other Lamp (1917)

With the stage name of Viola Dana, she entered films in 1910, including A Christmas Carol (1910). Her first motion picture was made at a former Manhattan (New York) riding academy on West 61st Street. The stalls had been transformed to dressing rooms. Dana became a star with the Edison Manufacturing Company, working at their studio in the Bronx.

She fell in love with Edison director John Hancock Collins, and they married in 1915.

Dana's success in Collins's Edison features such as Children of Eve (1915) and The Cossack Whip (1916) encouraged producer B.A. Rolfe to offer the couple lucrative contracts with his company, Rolfe Photoplays, which released through Metro Pictures Corporation. Dana and Collins accepted Rolfe's offer in 1916 and made several films for Rolfe/Metro, notably The Girl Without a Soul and Blue Jeans (both 1917). Rolfe closed his New York-area studio in the face of the 1918 flu pandemic and sent most of his personnel to California. Dana left before Collins, who was finishing work at the studio; however, Collins contracted influenza and died in a New York hotel room on October 23, 1918.

Dana remained in California acting for Metro throughout the 1920s, but her popularity gradually waned. One of her latter roles was in Frank Capra's first film for Columbia Pictures, That Certain Thing (1928). She retired from the screen in 1929. Her final screen credits are roles in Two Sisters (1929), One Splendid Hour (1929), and with her sister Leonie Flugrath, better known as Shirley Mason (years earlier she had appeared with her older sister, Edna Flugrath, in the 1923 film The Social Code), in The Show of Shows (1929). By the time she made her final film appearance in 1933, she had appeared in over 100 films. She briefly came out of retirement to appear in her first and only television role in a small part on Lux Video Theatre in 1956.

More than 50 years after her retirement from the screen, Dana appeared in the Kevin Brownlow/David Gill documentary series Hollywood (1980), discussing her career as a silent film star during the 1920s. Footage from the interview was used in the later documentary series Buster Keaton: A Hard Act to Follow (1987) from the same team.

== Personal life ==
Dana's first husband was Edison director John H. Collins, who died in the influenza pandemic of 1918.

In 1920, she began a relationship with Ormer "Lock" Locklear, an aviator, military veteran, and budding film star. Locklear died when his aircraft crashed on August 2, 1920, during a nighttime film shoot for The Skywayman. Although married, Locklear had been dating Dana, and on the night before his death, in a premonition, gave her some of his personal effects. Dana witnessed the 1920 crash and did not fly again for 25 years. (Note: In the "Hazards of the Game" episode of Hollywood (1980), actresses Leatrice Joy and Viola Dana recalled Locklear and the making of his last film. Dana described his final flight.) Locklear was reputed to be the prototype for the character of Waldo Pepper, played by Robert Redford in The Great Waldo Pepper (1975). Dana was an honored guest at its premiere.

Dana was married to Yale football star and actor Maurice "Lefty" Flynn in June 1925. They divorced in February 1929. Her third and final marriage was to golfer Jimmy Thomson from 1930 to March 1945. In later years, she volunteered at the Motion Picture & Television Country House and Hospital, and she moved there permanently in 1979. In 1986, one year before her death, she was the subject of a documentary short by Anthony Slide titled Vi: Portrait of a Silent Star, in which she talks of her life and career.

== Death ==
Dana died on July 3, 1987, at the Motion Picture & Television Country House and Hospital in Woodland Hills, Los Angeles at the age of 90.

For her contribution to the motion picture industry, Dana has a star on the Hollywood Walk of Fame. It is located at 6541 Hollywood Boulevard.

== Filmography ==
=== Short subject ===
| Year | Title | Role | Notes |
|---|---|---|---|
| 1910 | A Christmas Carol | | |
| 1912 | Children Who Labor | The Immigrant's Older Daughter | |
| 1912 | The Butler and the Maid | The Statue | |
| 1912 | How Father Accomplished His Work | The Second Daughter | |
| 1912 | The Lord and the Peasant | Mary's Sister | |
| 1912 | The Third Thanksgiving | | |
| 1914 | Molly the Drummer Boy | Molly Mason | |
| 1914 | My Friend from India | Gertie Underholt | |
| 1914 | Treasure Trove | Cora Fairfield | |
| 1914 | The Blind Fiddler | The Fairy | |
| 1914 | The Adventure of the Hasty Elopement | Ruth | |
| 1914 | Seth's Sweetheart | Sally | |
| 1914 | Who Goes There? | Kate - Toppy's Sweetheart | |
| 1915 | Lena | Euphemia Miggles | |
| 1915 | A Thorn Among Roses | | |
| 1915 | The Stone Heart | Nan Cowles | |
| 1915 | The Glory of Clementina | Etta Concanna | |
| 1915 | A Spiritual Elopement | Evelyn Banks | |
| 1915 | The Portrait in the Attic | Thelma | |
| 1915 | A Theft in the Dark | Lady Genevieve | |
| 1915 | The Stoning | Ruth Fenton | |
| 1915 | The Slavey Student | Alma Picket | |
| 1915 | Her Happiness | Viola Winters | |
| 1933 | The Strange Case of Poison Ivy | | |

The Adventure of the Hasty Elopement (1914)

=== Features ===
Lobby card from Naughty Nannette-1927

| Year | Title | Role | Notes |
|---|---|---|---|
| 1915 | The House of the Lost Court | Dolores Edgerton | Lost film |
| 1915 | Cohen's Luck | Minnie Cohen | Lost film |
| 1915 | On Dangerous Paths | Eleanor Thurston | Lost film |
| 1915 | Gladiola | Gladiola Bain | Lost film |
| 1915 | Children of Eve | Fifty-Fifty Mamie | |
| 1916 | The Innocence of Ruth | Ruth Travers | |
| 1916 | The Flower of No Man's Land | Echo | Lost film |
| 1916 | The Light of Happiness | Tangletop | Lost film |
| 1916 | The Gates of Eden | Eve / Evelyn | Lost film |
| 1916 | The Cossack Whip | Darya Orlinsky | |
| 1917 | Threads of Fate | Dorothea | Lost film |
| 1917 | Rosie O'Grady | Rosie O'Grady | Lost film |
| 1917 | The Mortal Sin | Jane Anderson | Lost film |
| 1917 | God's Law and Man's | Ameia | Lost film |
| 1917 | Lady Barnacle | Lakshima | Lost film |
| 1917 | Aladdin’s Other Lamp | Patricia Smith (Patsy) | Lost film |
| 1917 | The Girl Without A Soul | Unity Beaumont / Priscilla Beaumont | |
| 1917 | Blue Jeans | June | |
| 1918 | The Winding Trail | Audrey Graham | Lost film |
| 1918 | A Weaver of Dreams | Judith Sylvester | Lost film |
| 1918 | Breakers Ahead | Ruth Bowman | Lost film |
| 1918 | Riders of the Night | Sally Castleton | |
| 1918 | The Only Road | Nita | |
| 1918 | Opportunity | Mary Willard | |
| 1918 | Flower of the Dusk | Barbara North | |
| 1919 | The Gold Cure | Annice Paisch | Lost film |
| 1919 | Satan Junior | Diana Ardway | |
| 1919 | The Parisian Tigress | Jeanne | Lost film |
| 1919 | False Evidence | Madelon MacTavish | |
| 1919 | Some Bride | Patricia Morley | Lost film |
| 1919 | The Microbe | Happy O'Brien, The Microbe | Lost film |
| 1919 | Please Get Married | Muriel Ashley | Lost film |
| 1920 | The Willow Tree | O-Riu | |
| 1920 | Dangerous to Men | Eliza | Lost film |
| 1920 | The Chorus Girl's Romance | Marcia Meadows | |
| 1920 | Blackmail | Flossie Golden | Lost film |
| 1920 | Cinderella's Twin | Connie McGill | Lost film |
| 1921 | The Off-Shore Pirate | Ardita Farnam | Lost film |
| 1921 | Puppets of Fate | Sorrentina Palombra | Lost film |
| 1921 | Home Stuff | Madge Joy | |
| 1921 | Life's Darn Funny | Zoe Roberts | Lost film |
| 1921 | The Match-Breaker | Jane Morgan | Lost film |
| 1921 | There Are No Villains | Rosa Moreland | Lost film |
| 1922 | The Fourteenth Lover | Vi Marchmont | |
| 1922 | Glass Houses | Joy Duval | Lost film |
| 1922 | Seeing's Believing | Diana Webster | |
| 1922 | They Like 'Em Rough | Katherine | Lost film |
| 1922 | The Five Dollar Baby | Ruth | Lost film |
| 1922 | June Madness | Clytie Whitmore | Lost film |
| 1922 | Love in the Dark | Mary Duffy | Lost film |
| 1923 | Crinoline and Romance | Miss Emmy Lou | Lost film |
| 1923 | Her Fatal Millions | Mary Bishop | Lost film |
| 1923 | Hollywood | Viola Dana | Lost film |
| 1923 | Rouged Lips | Norah MacPherson | |
| 1923 | The Social Code | Babs Van Buren | Lost film |
| 1923 | In Search of a Thrill | Ann Clemance | |
| 1923 | A Noise in Newboro | Martha Mason | Lost film |
| 1924 | The Heart Bandit | Molly O'Hara | Lost film |
| 1924 | Don't Doubt Your Husband | Helen Blake | Lost film |
| 1924 | The Beauty Prize | Connie Du Bois | Lost film |
| 1924 | Revelation | Joline Hofer | |
| 1924 | Merton of the Movies | Sally Montague, 'Flips' | Lost film |
| 1924 | Open All Night | Thérèse Duverne | |
| 1924 | Along Came Ruth | Ruth Ambrose | Lost film |
| 1924 | As Man Desires | Pandora La Croix | Lost film |
| 1925 | Forty Winks | Eleanor Butterworth | Lost film |
| 1925 | The Necessary Evil | Shirley Holmes | Lost film |
| 1925 | Winds of Chance | Rouletta Kirby | |
| 1925 | The Great Love | Minette Bunker | Lost film |
| 1926 | Wild Oats Lane | Marie, the Girl | Lost film |
| 1926 | Bigger Than Barnum's | Juanita Calles | Lost film |
| 1926 | Kosher Kitty Kelly | Kitty Kelly | Incomplete film, missing a reel |
| 1926 | The Ice Flood | Marie O'Neill | |
| 1926 | The Silent Lover | Scadsza | |
| 1926 | Bred in Old Kentucky | Katie O'Doone | |
| 1927 | Home Struck | Barbara Page | |
| 1927 | Salvation Jane | Salvation Jane | |
| 1927 | Naughty Nanette | Nanette Pearson | |
| 1927 | Lure of the Night Club | Mary Murdock | |
| 1928 | That Certain Thing | Molly Kelly | |
| 1929 | Two Sisters | Jean / Jane | Lost film |
| 1929 | One Splendid Hour | Bobbie Walsh | |
| 1929 | The Show of Shows | Performer in 'The Pirate,' 'Meet My Sister' & 'Ladies of the Ensemble' Numbers | Black-and-white version is extant, and the technicolor version is partially extant |

== Gallery ==
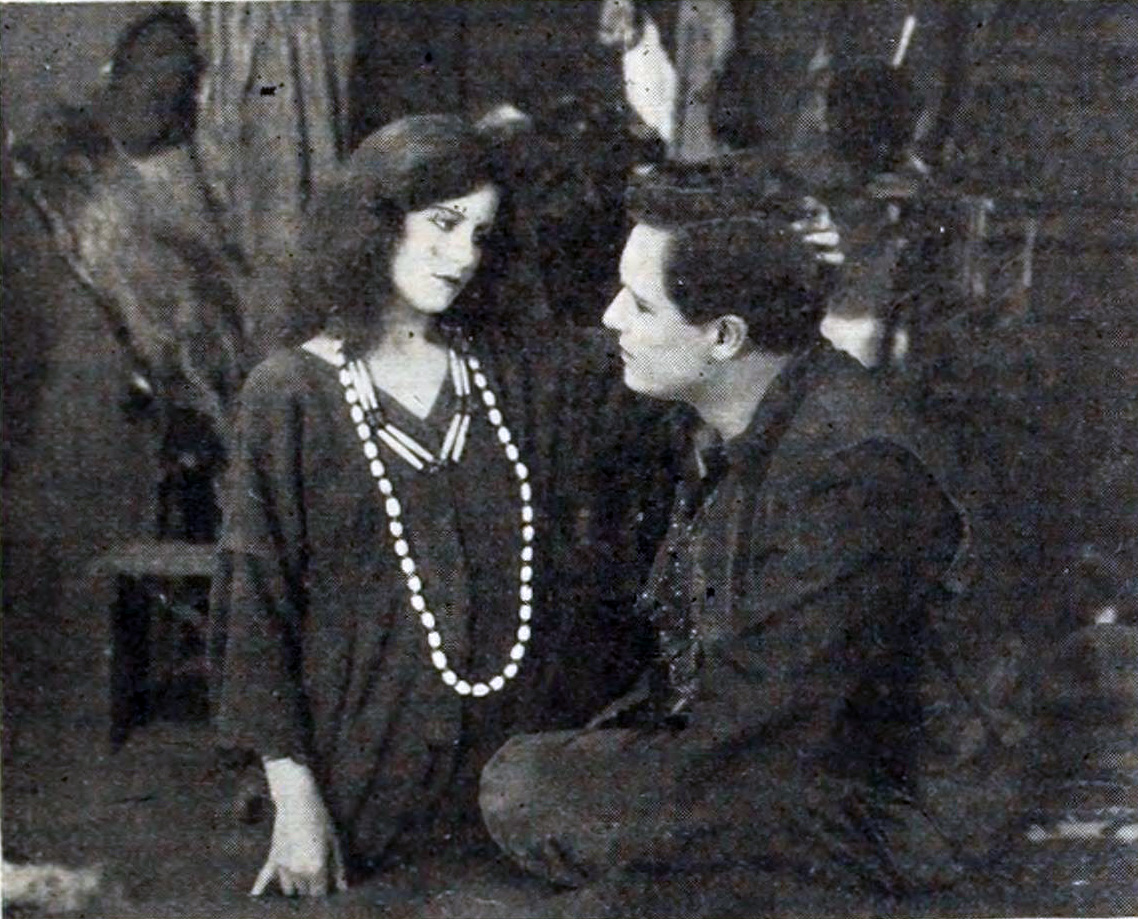
The Flower of No Man's Land (1916)

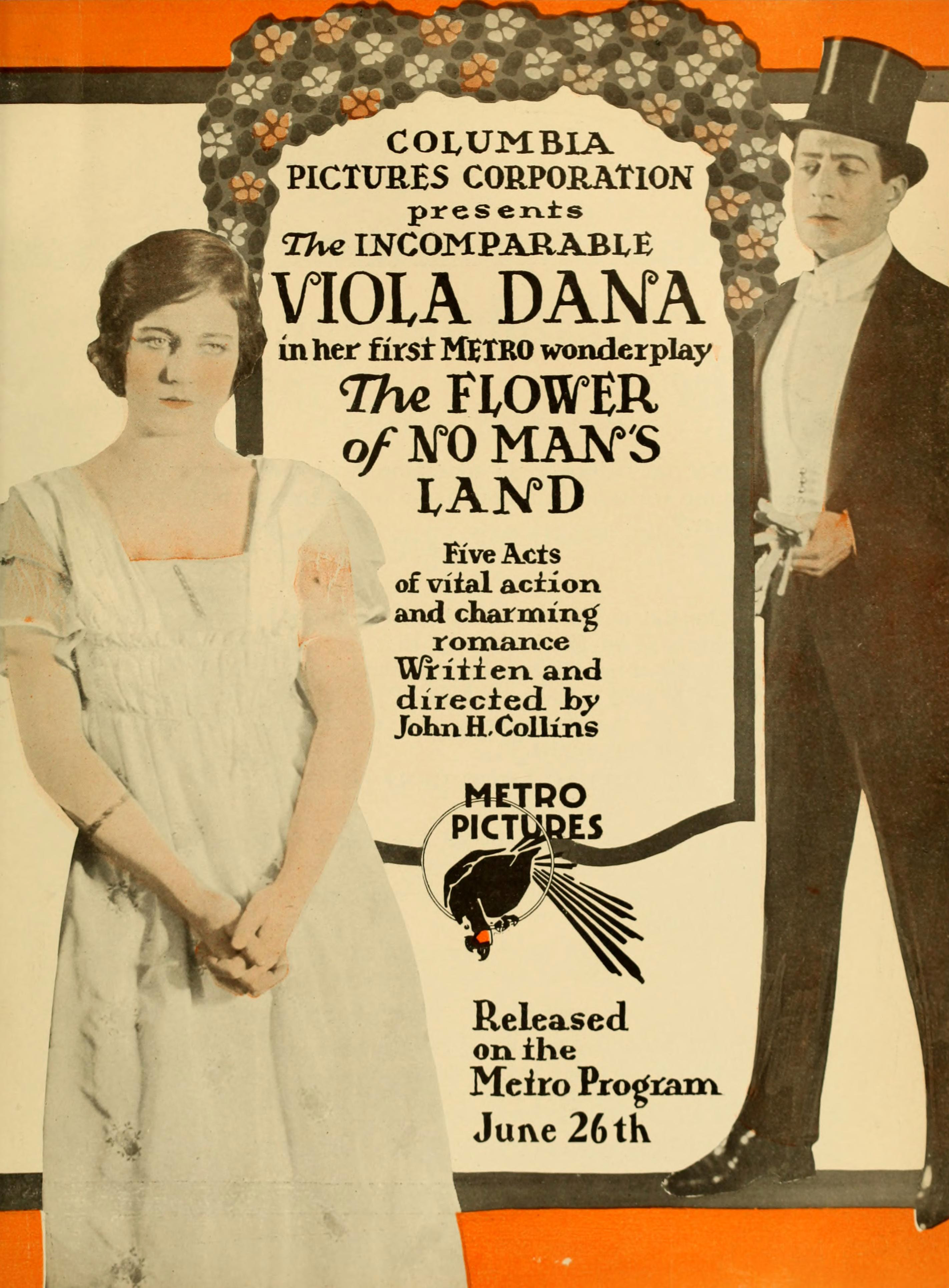
The Flower of No Man's Land (1916)

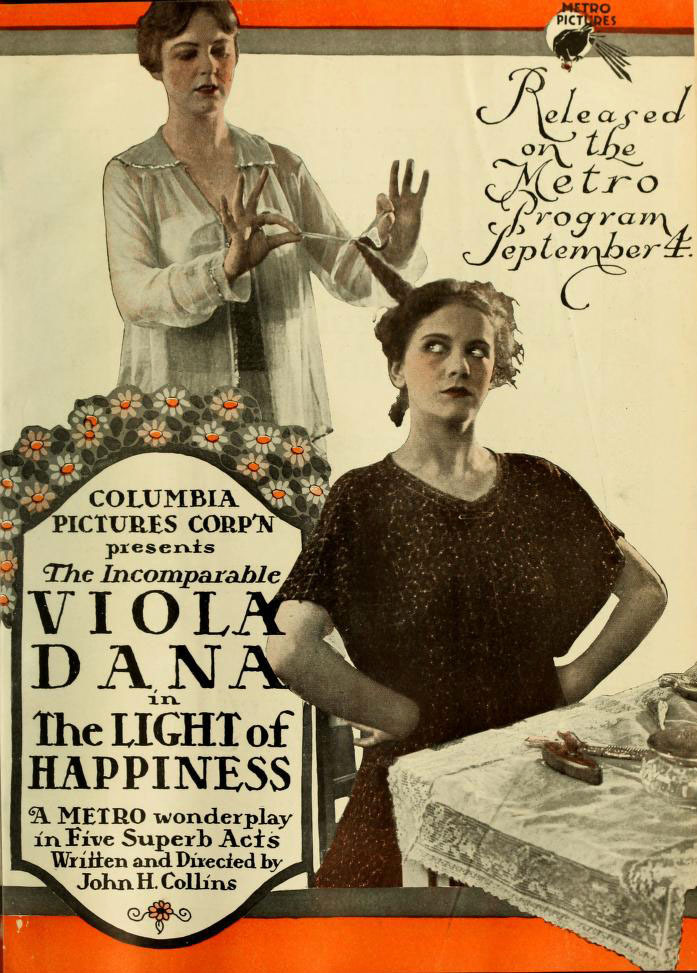
The Light of Happiness (1916)

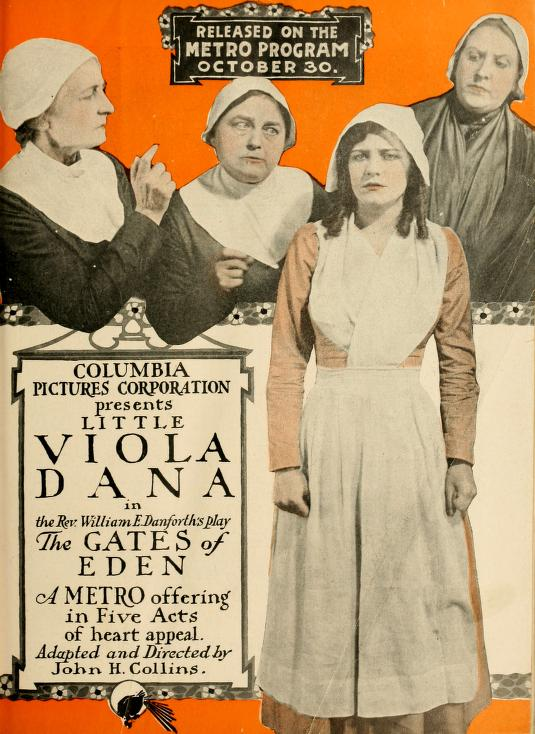
The Gates of Eden (1916)

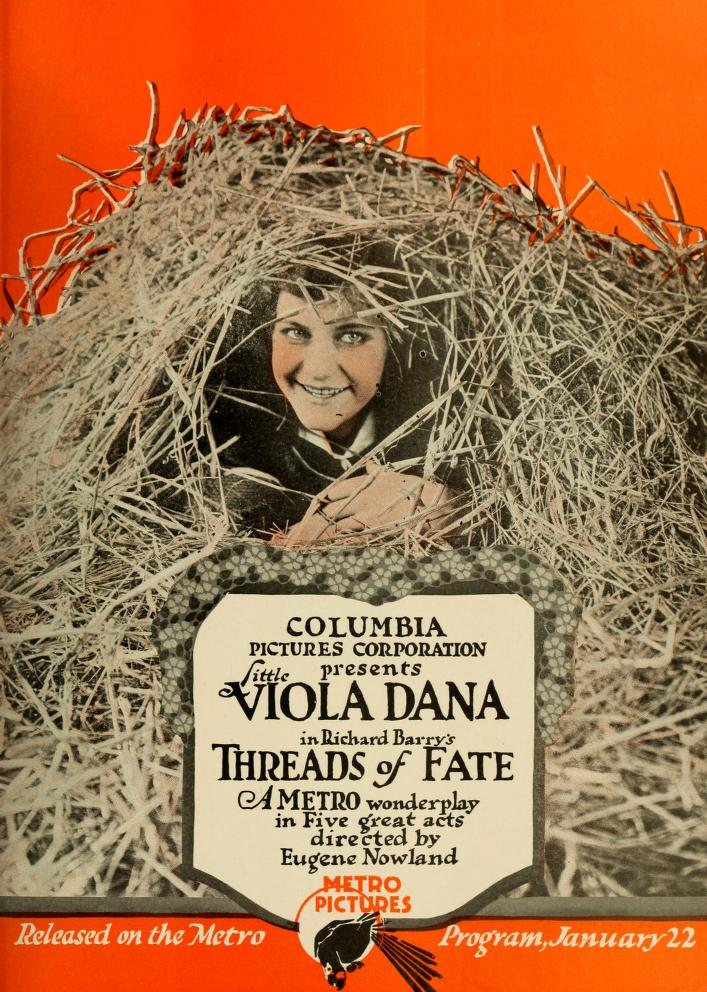
Threads of Fate (1917)

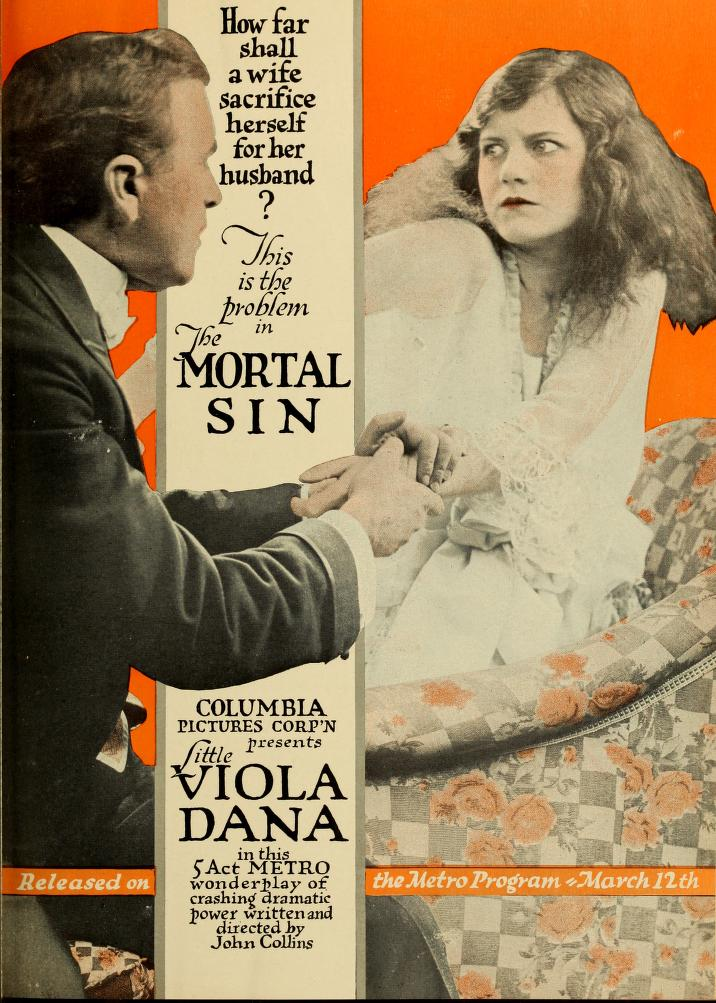
The Mortal Sin (1917)

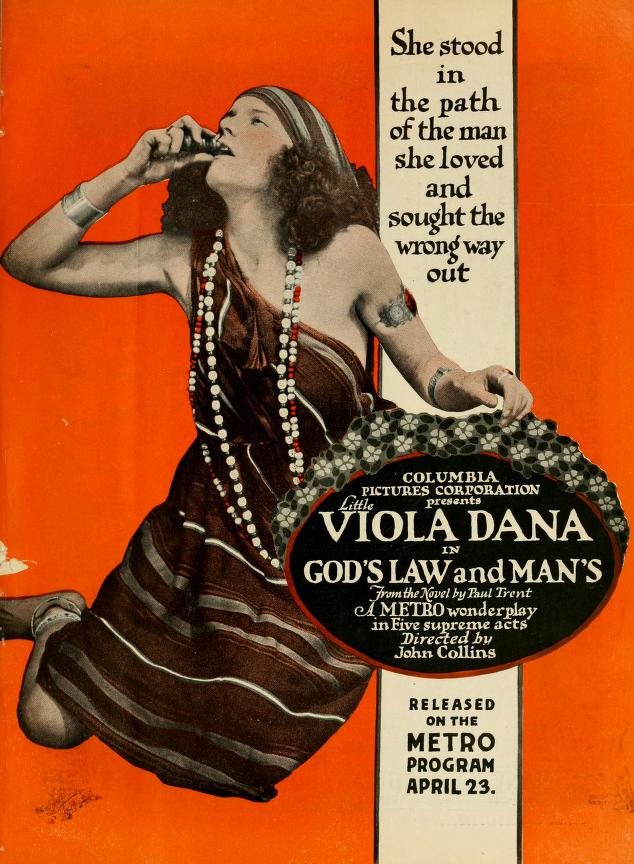
God's Law and Man's (1917)

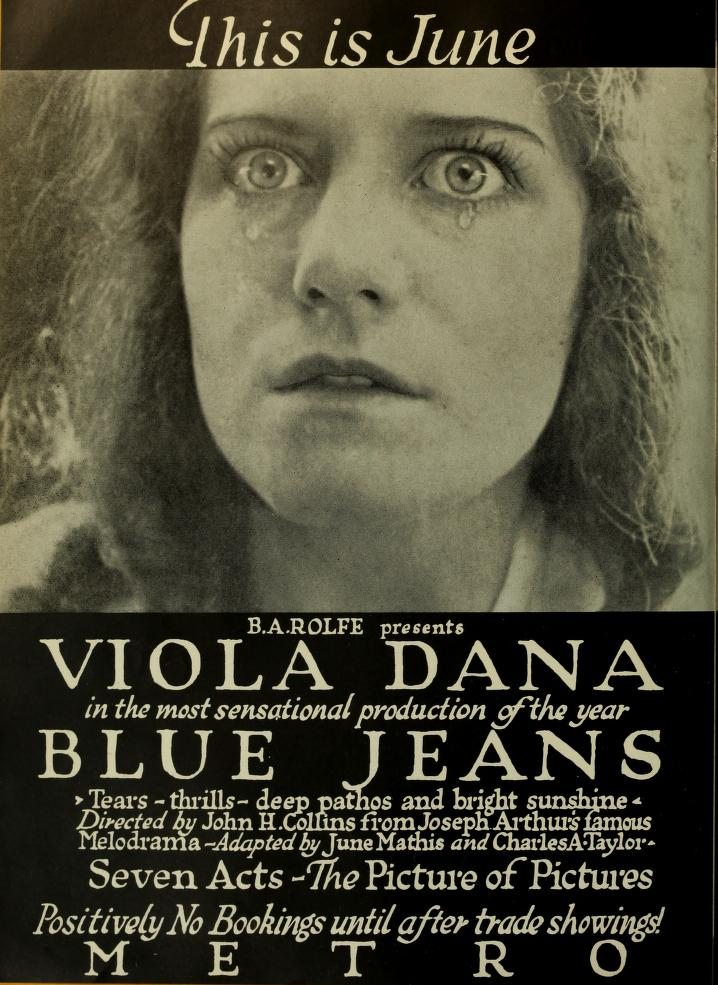
Blue Jeans (1917)

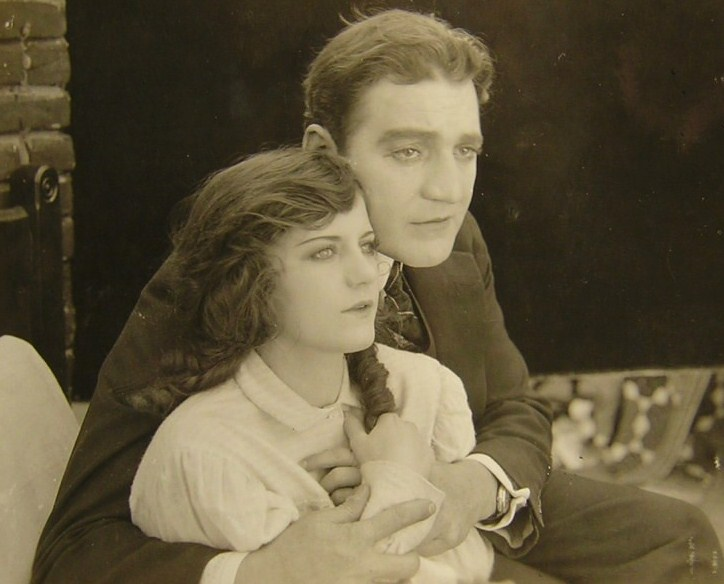
A Weaver of Dreams (1918)

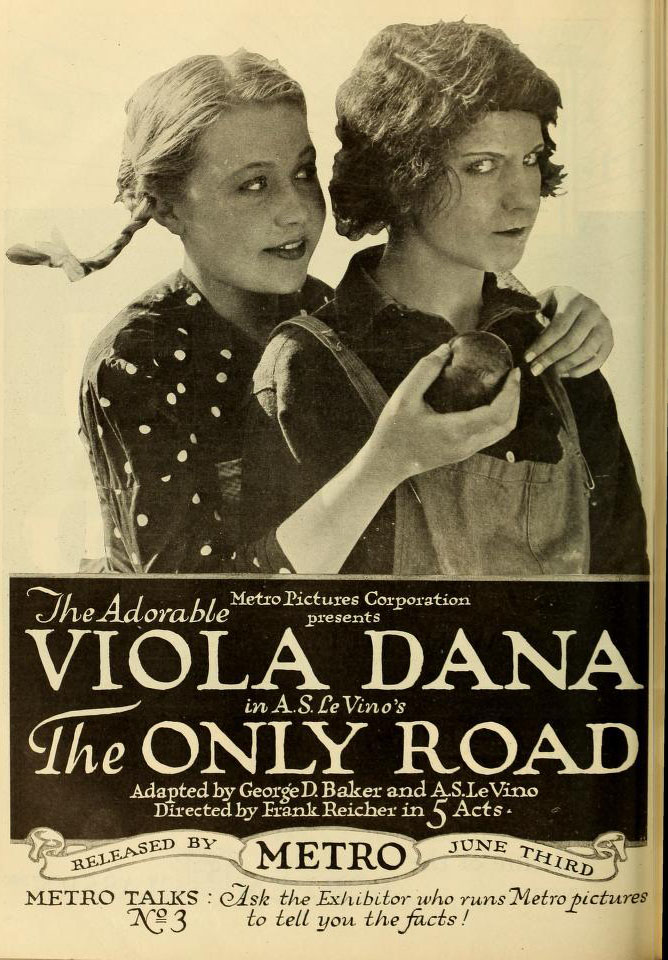
The Only Road (1918)

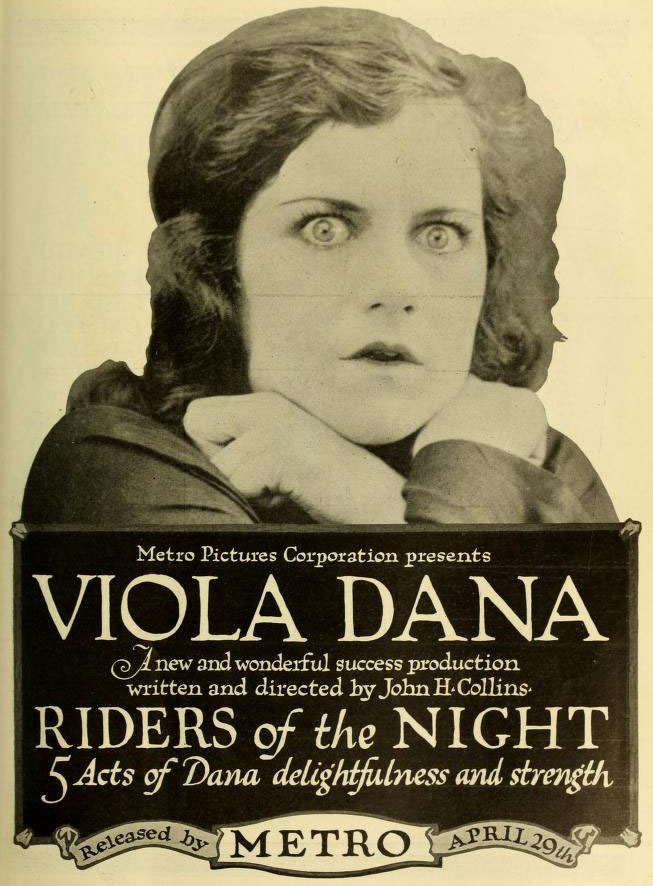
Riders of the Night (1918)

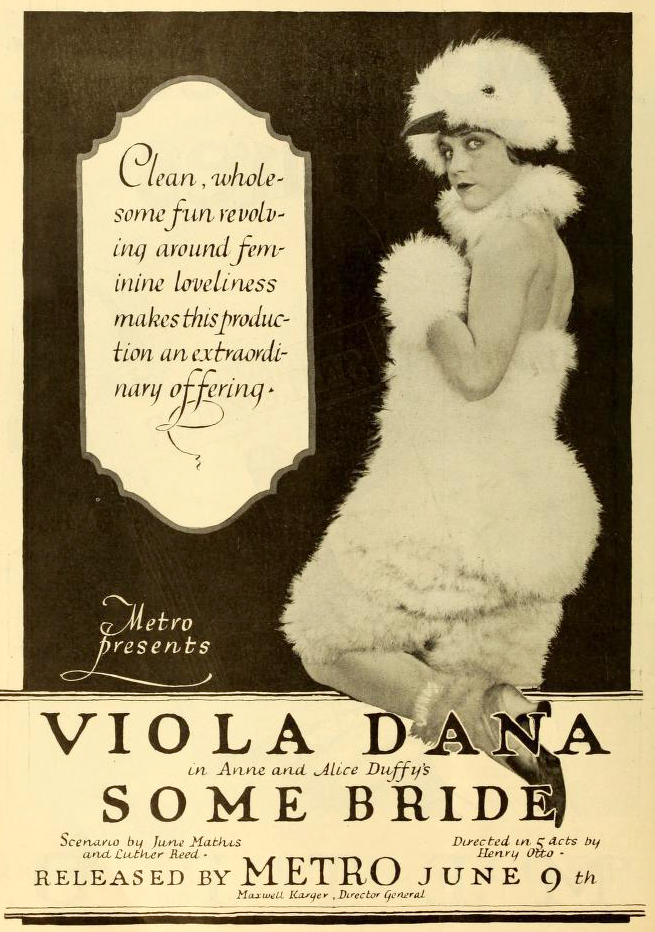
Some Bride (1919)
