= The Social Code =

1923 film by Oscar Apfel

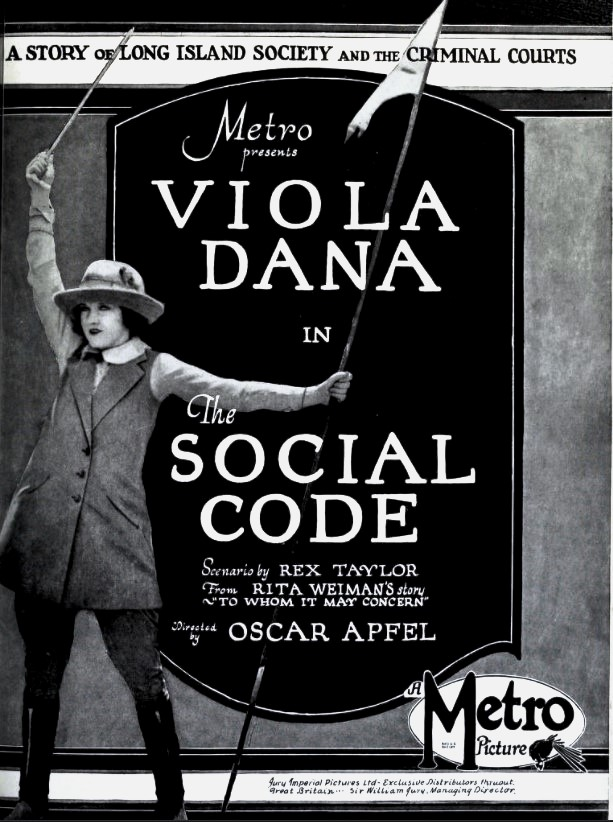
- Advertisement
- Directed by: Oscar Apfel
- Written by: Rex Taylor
- Based on: "To Whom It May Concern" by Rita Weiman
- Starring: Viola Dana
- Cinematography: John Arnold...(Italian)
- Production company: Metro Pictures
- Distributed by: Metro Pictures
- Release date: October 16, 1923
- Running time: 50 minutes
- Country: United States
- Language: Silent (English intertitles)

The Social Code is a 1923 American silent drama film directed by Oscar Apfel and starring Viola Dana. It was produced and distributed by Metro Pictures. Dana's older sister, Edna Flugrath, also features in the film.

== Cast ==
- Viola Dana as Babs Van Buren
- Malcolm McGregor as Dean Cardigan
- Edna Flugrath as Connie Grant
- Huntley Gordon as Judge Evans Grant (credited as Huntly Gordon)
- Cyril Chadwick as Colby Dickinson
- William J. Humphrey as District Attorney
- John St. Polis as Defense Attorney (credited as John Sainpolis)

== Preservation ==
With no prints of The Social Code located in any film archives, it is now a lost film.
