= Cinderella's Twin =

1920 film by Dallas M. Fitzgerald

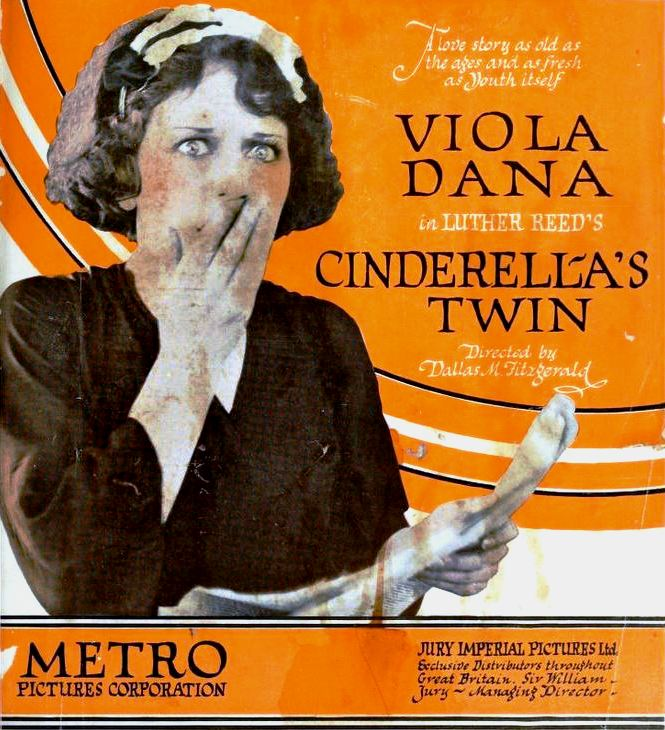
- Directed by: Dallas M. Fitzgerald
- Written by: Luther Reed (scenario)
- Based on: story by Luther Reed
- Produced by: Bayard Veiller
- Starring: Viola Dana
- Cinematography: John Arnold
- Production company: Metro Pictures
- Distributed by: Metro Pictures
- Release date: 27 December 1920
- Running time: 6 reels
- Country: United States
- Language: Silent (English intertitles)

Cinderella's Twin is a lost 1920 silent film comedy directed by Dallas M. Fitzgerald and starring Viola Dana. It was produced and distributed by Metro Pictures to poor audience reception.

== Cast ==
- Viola Dana as Connie McGill
- Wallace MacDonald as Prentice Blue
- Ruth Stonehouse as The Lady
- Cecil Foster as Helen Flint
- Edward Connelly as Pa Du Geen
- Victory Bateman as Ma Du Geen
- Gertrude Short as Marcia Valentine
- Irene Hunt as Gwendolyn Valentine
- Edward Cecil as Williams
- Calvert Carter as Boggs, a Butler
