= Blackmail (1920 film) =

1920 film by Dallas M. Fitzgerald

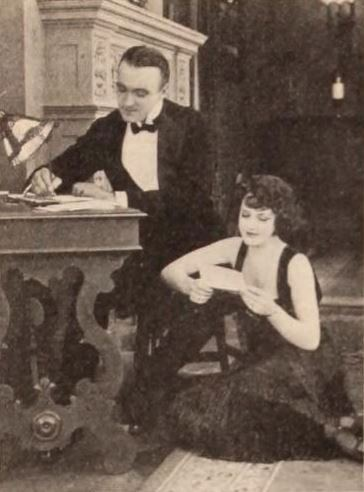
- Film still
- Directed by: Dallas M. Fitzgerald
- Written by: Lucia Chamberlain; Albert S. Le Vino
- Starring: Viola Dana; Alfred Allen; Wyndham Standing
- Cinematography: John Arnold
- Production company: Screen Classics
- Distributed by: Metro Pictures
- Release date: October 4, 1920
- Running time: 6 reels
- Country: United States
- Language: Silent (English intertitles)

Blackmail is a 1920 American silent drama film directed by Dallas M. Fitzgerald and starring Viola Dana, Alfred Allen, and Wyndham Standing. The film reverses the typical vampire plot of the early silent film period by having the seductive woman, after her marriage, being blackmailed by the rich men she formerly preyed upon.

== Cast ==
- Viola Dana as Flossie Golden
- Alfred Allen as Harry Golden
- Wyndham Standing as Richard Harding
- Edward Cecil as Larry
- Florence Turner as Lena
- Jack Roi as James Venable
- Lydia Knott as Mrs. Venable
- Fred Kelsey as Police Inspector

== Bibliography ==
- Langman, Larry. American Film Cycles: The Silent Era. Greenwood Publishing, 1998.
