= Ricca Allen =

Canadian actress

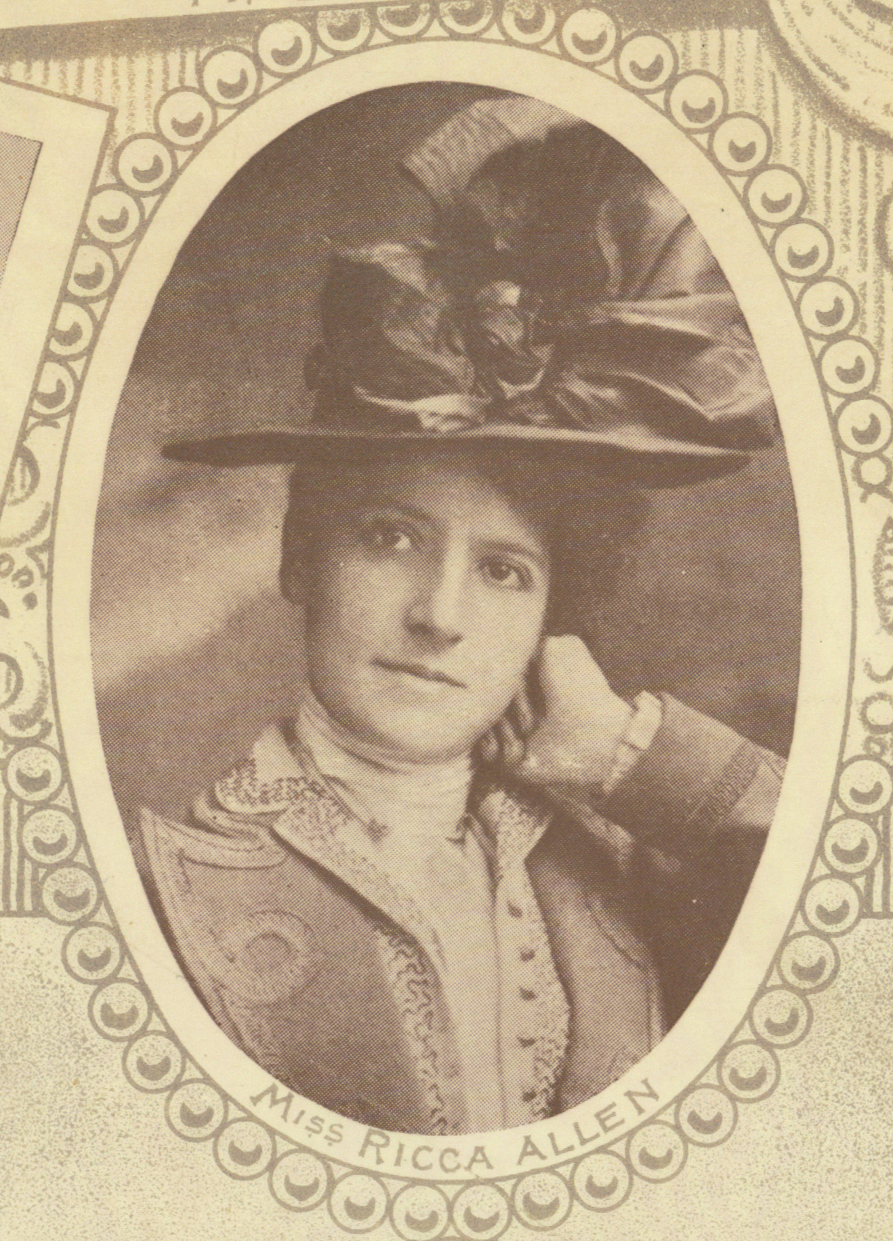
- Allen in the late 1880s
- Born: June 9, 1863; Victoria, British Columbia, Canada
- Died: September 13, 1949 (aged 86); Los Angeles, California, U.S.
- Occupation: Actress
- Years active: 1913-1941

Ricca Allen (June 9, 1863 – September 13, 1949) was a Canadian-born stage and film actress. She appeared in more than 50 films between 1913 and 1941.

Allen was born in Victoria, Colony of Vancouver Island to John Allen of Oakland, California. Allen and her sisters Louise Allen and Ray Allen were popular dancers in the 1880s. For nine years, she performed in a company headed by Nance O'Neil. She later had her own company in vaudeville.

Allen performed at Niblo's Garden for more than five years. Her Broadway credits include Blind Alleys (1924), Up and Down Broadway (1910), Uncle Tom's Cabin (1907), Judith of Bethulia (1904), The Fires of St. John (1904), Hedda Gabler (1904) and Magda (1904).

Allen died in Los Angeles, California.

== Partial filmography ==
- Fatty Again (1914)
- A Daughter of the Gods (1916)
- Aladdin’s Other Lamp (1917)
- The Mortal Sin (1917)
- The Lifted Veil (1917)
- Life's Whirlpool (1917)
- Outwitted (1917)
- The Duchess of Doubt (1917)
- God's Man (1917)
- A Wife by Proxy (1917)
- Lady Barnacle (1917)
- The Heart of a Girl (1918)
- Our Mrs. McChesney (1918)
- The Shell Game (1918)
- With Neatness and Dispatch (1918)
- The Divorcee (1919)
- Speedy Meade (1919)
- The Man Who Stayed at Home (1919)
- Headin' Home (1920)
- The Song of the Soul (1920)
- The Oath (1921)
- Silas Marner (1922)
- The Empty Cradle (1923)
- The Mad Dancer (1925)
- The Virgin Wife (1926)
- Close Harmony (1929)
- The Trail of the Lonesome Pine (1936)
- One Million B.C. (1940)
