= Lucia Chamberlain =

American novelist (1882–1978)

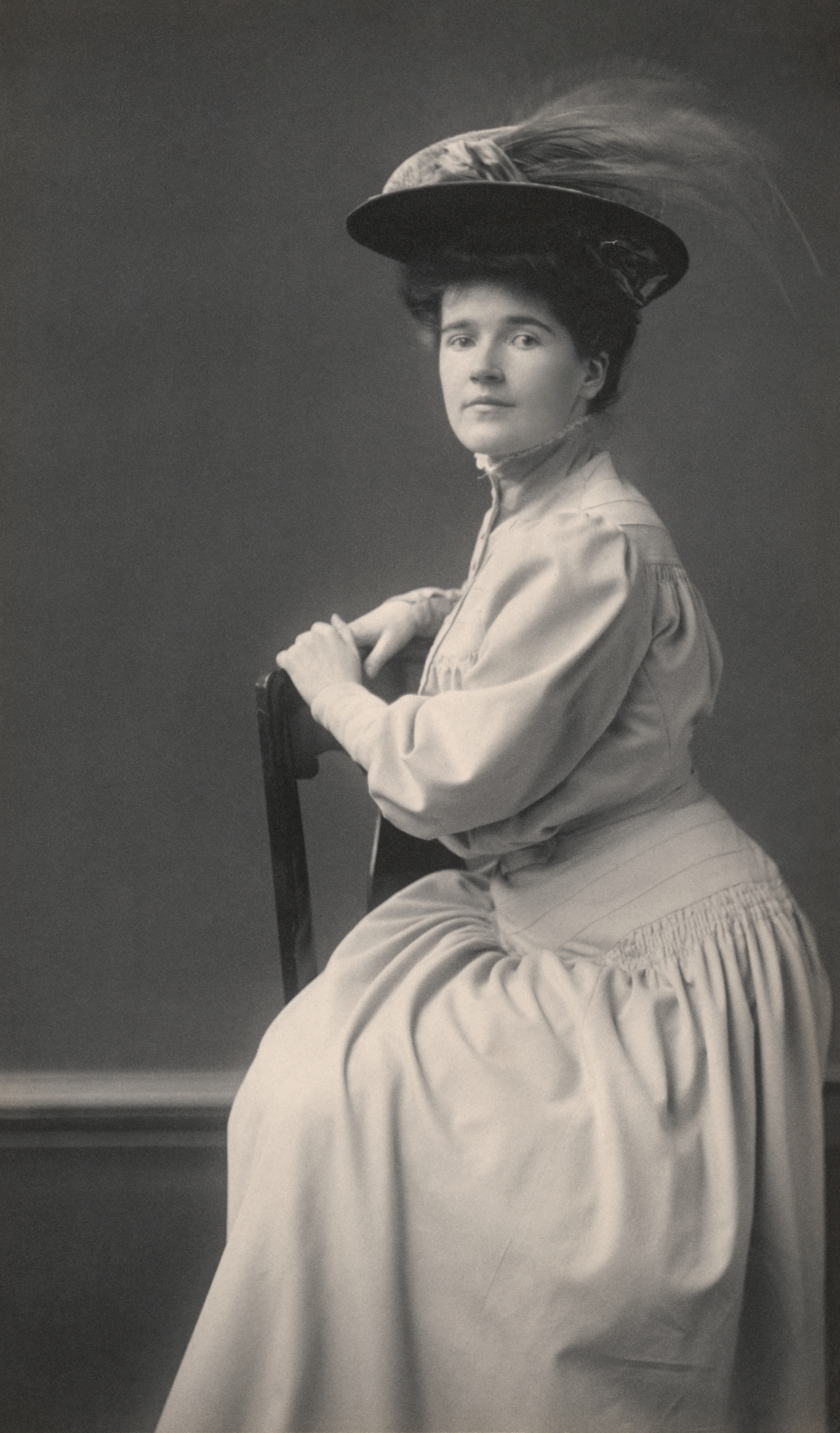
- Chamberlain, photographed by Zaida Ben-Yusuf in c. 1908
- Born: February 16, 1882; San Francisco, California, US
- Died: December 3, 1978 (aged 96); Santa Cruz, California, US
- Occupation: Writer
- Relatives: Mary Curtis Richardson (aunt)

Lucia Chamberlain (February 16, 1882 – December 3, 1978) was an American novelist. Her 1909 book The Other Side of the Door was the basis of a 1916 film of the same name, and her 1917 short story "The Underside" formed the basis of the 1920 film Blackmail. The 1916 film The Wedding Guest is also based on her writing.

== Early life ==
Chamberlain was born in San Francisco, the daughter of John Chamberlain and Leila Curtis Chamberlain. Her maternal grandfather Lucien Curtis was an engraver from Connecticut, and her mother had a wood engraving business in the city in the 1870s. Her aunt, Mary Curtis Richardson, was a noted portrait artist. She and her sister were encouraged to write by Canadian poet Bliss Carman.

== Career ==
WorldCat lists Chamberlain's genres of writing as fiction, detective and mystery fiction, short stories, and Western fiction. At least two of her books were translated into Swedish and published as Den stulna ringen (The Stolen Ring) and Falska indicier (False Clues).

H. L. Mencken, writing in The Smart Set in 1909, described The Other Side of the Door as: "A mildly diverting tale of adventure, with the scene laid in early San Francisco, and a fiery Latin flavor in some of the characters."

Chamberlain wrote her first two books, Mrs. Essington and The Coast of Chance, in collaboration with her older sister, Esther, who owned an advertising agency in New York. Mrs. Essington was reviewed in The New York Times. Esther died in 1908.

In 1932, Chamberlain co-organized an exhibition of works by Mary Curtis Richardson, at the California Palace of the Legion of Honor in San Francisco.

== Personal life ==
Lucia Chamberlain lived on Russian Hill in San Francisco. She died in 1978, in Santa Cruz, California, aged 96 years.

== Selected publications ==
- Chamberlain, Esther; Chamberlain, Lucia (1905). Mrs Essington: The Romance of a House-Party. New York: Century.
- Chamberlain, Esther; Chamberlain, Lucia (1908). The Coast of Chance. New York: Grosset & Dunlap.
- Chamberlain, Lucia (1909). The Other Side of the Door. New York: Grosset & Dunlap.
- Chamberlain, Lucia (1910). Son of the Wind. New York: Bobbs-Merrill.
- Chamberlain, Lucia. Connors at Shungopovi. (From Everybody's Magazine, September 1905.)
