= Fatty Again =

1914 film by Fatty Arbuckle

- Directed by: Fatty Arbuckle
- Starring: Fatty Arbuckle
- Production company: Keystone Studios
- Distributed by: Mutual Film
- Release date: October 3, 1914
- Running time: 1 reel
- Country: United States
- Languages: Silent; English intertitles

Fatty Again is a 1914 American silent short comedy film directed by and starring Fatty Arbuckle. The film was re-edited and re-released in 1918 under the title Fatty the Four-flusher.

== Cast ==
- Roscoe "Fatty" Arbuckle
- Minta Durfee
- Charles Murray
- Ricca Allen
- Jess Dandy as Carnival Boss (uncredited)

== Preservation ==
A 35mm copy of Fatty Again was gifted to George Eastman House by Luigi Pallme in 1998.

== See also ==
- List of American films of 1914
- Fatty Arbuckle filmography
