= Jess Dandy =

American actor of the vaudeville and silent-film era

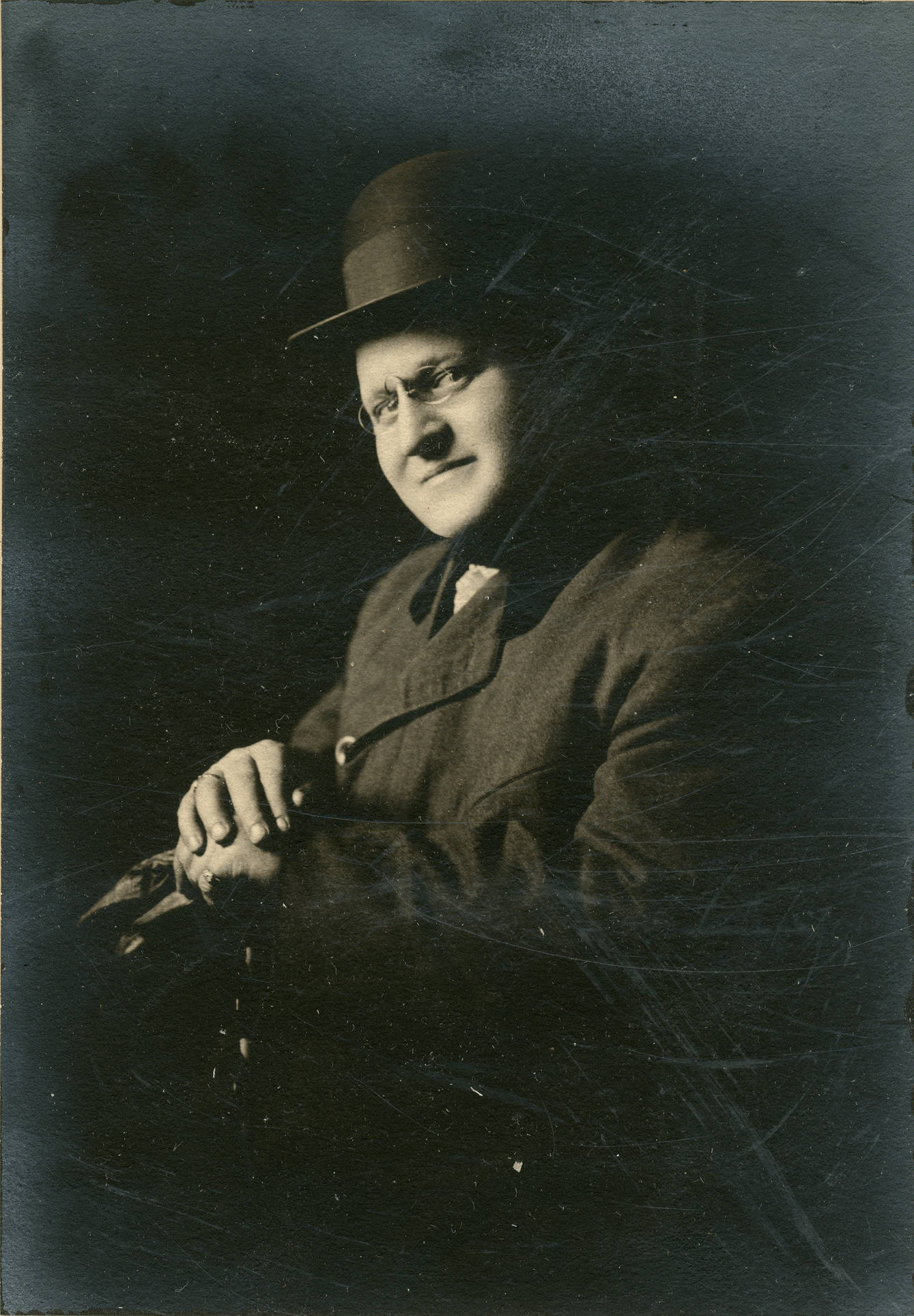
- Born: November 9, 1871
- Died: April 15, 1923 (aged 51)
- Occupation: film actor

Jess Dandy (December 7, 1871 in Rochester, New York – April 15, 1923 in Brookline, Massachusetts) was an American actor during the silent movie era in Hollywood. His real name was Jesse A. Danzig, and his parents were Abraham Danzig, an immigrant from Germany, and American-born Jennie Stern. His first stage appearance was at age 26 in the Vaudeville venue American Roof Garden. He then moved to a leading role at Keith's Union Square Theatre. In 1903 he opened in the musical The Prince of Pilsen, a role that he played all over the country, emphasizing a German accent. He underwent a number of operations for vocal issues, and then appeared in two plays, "Marcelle" and "Dick Whittington," before moving to Hollywood. While working at Keystone Studios in 1914, Dandy appeared in nine of Charlie Chaplin's comedy shorts. He was known for dialects, and sometimes played Jewish, Dutch, and German characters, emphasizing stereotypes. He died of sepsis following a carbuncle operation, and received a Masonic funeral.

== Selected filmography ==
- His Favourite Pastime (1914)
- The New Janitor as Bank president (1914)
- The Star Boarder (1914)
- The Property Man (1914)
- The Face on the Bar Room Floor (1914)
- His New Profession (1914)
- The Rounders (1914)
- The Masquerader (1914)
- Dough and Dynamite (1914)
- Killing Horace (1914)
- Hello, Mabel (1914)
- Fatty Again
- Leading Lizzie Astray
