= Children of Eve =

- Directed by: John H. Collins
- Written by: John H. Collins
- Based on: Katy by John H. Collins
- Produced by: Edison Manufacturing Company
- Cinematography: Ned Van Buren; John Arnold(fr)
- Distributed by: Kleine-Edison Feature Films
- Release date: November 10, 1915
- Running time: 73 minutes
- Country: USA
- Language: Silent..English titles

Children of Eve is a 1915 silent film directed by John H. Collins and starring Viola Dana. It was produced by the Edison Manufacturing Company, distributed by an arrangement between Edison and George Kleine.

== Cast ==
- Viola Dana - Fifty-Fifty Mamie
- Robert Conness - Henry Clay Madison
- Tom Blake - Bennie the Typ (*as Thomas F. Blake)
- Nellie Grant - Flossy Wilson
- Robert Walker - Bert Madison (*aka Robert D. Walker)
- William Wadsworth - Peddler
- James Harris - Mill Foreman
- Hubert Dawley - Bobbie Roche
- Warren Cook - Doctor
- Brad Sutton - Bouncer

== Preservation status ==
- The film is preserved in the George Eastman House collection and The Library of Congress.
