= The Cossack Whip =

1916 silent film

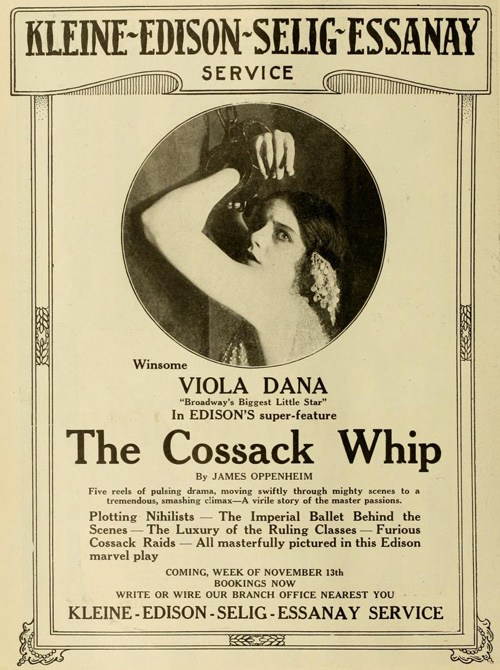
- Directed by: John H. Collins
- Written by: James Oppenheim; Paul Sloane
- Produced by: Edward Lorusso
- Starring: Viola Dana; Richard Tucker; Robert Walker
- Cinematography: John Arnold
- Production company: Edison Pictures
- Distributed by: K-E-S-E Service
- Release date: November 13, 1916
- Running time: 61 minutes
- Country: United States
- Languages: Silent; English intertitles

The Cossack Whip is a 1916 American silent drama film directed by John H. Collins and starring Viola Dana, Richard Tucker and Robert Walker.

== Plot summary ==
Feodor Turov, chief of the Russian Czar's secret police, orders his Cossacks to attack a village he believes to be infested with rebels. The Cossacks attack the village and massacre almost everyone, and the young Katerina is whipped to death. Before escaping to England, her sister Darya swears to avenge her sister's death. Years later — now one of the world's most famous prima ballerinas — she returns to Russia. Turov falls in love with her and manages to secure a meeting. She coyly asks him to take her to see a prison first. As it turns out, what he has planned for her is nothing compared to what she has planned for him.

== Cast ==
- Viola Dana as Darya Orlinsky
- Grace Williams as Katerina Orlinsky
- Robert Walker as Alexis
- Frank Farrington as Ivan Turov — Cossack Officer
- Richard Tucker as Sergius Kordkin
- Sally Crute as Mme. Alla Pojeska
- William Wadsworth as Orlinsky — Darya's Father
- Robert Brower as Andre Lukovsky
- Saul Harrison as Misha Lukovsky
- Franklyn Hanna as Feodor Turov — Prefect of Police

== Bibliography ==
- Paul C. Spehr & Gunnar Lundquist. American Film Personnel and Company Credits, 1908-1920. McFarland, 1996.
