= Aladdin's Other Lamp =

Aladdin’s Other Lamp
- Directed by: John H. Collins
- Written by: June Mathis
- Based on: The Dream Girl (play) by Willard Mack
- Produced by: B.A. Rolfe
- Cinematography: John Arnold
- Production company: Rolfe Photoplays
- Distributed by: Metro Pictures
- Release date: June 25, 1917
- Running time: 5 reels
- Country: United States
- Language: Silent

Aladdin's Other Lamp is a lost 1917 American fantasy-comedy silent film based on the play, The Dream Girl by Willard Mack. It was adapted for the screen by June Mathis and directed by John H. Collins. The film stars Viola Dana and Robert Walker, and was distributed by Metro Pictures Corp., a forerunner of Metro-Goldwyn-Mayer.

== Synopsis ==
Patsy Smith is kidnapped by her father when she's a baby, after having a fight with Patsy's mother. When her father dies at sea, Captain Barnaby takes Patsy to a boardinghouse run by Mrs. Duff. Inspired by the Captain's tales of Aladdin, she goes on a hunt for her father's oriental lamp which Mrs. Duff has sold to a junk peddler. After finding the lamp, Patsy buys it and starts to rub it and the Genie Jehaunarara appears. The genie transforms her room, restores the Captain's leg and turns Mrs. Duff into a rag doll. However, the genie can't reunite Patsy with her mother, because it is beyond his magic. After the genie wins first prize at a masquerade ball for his attire, Patsy applauds and unwittingly causes him to disappear. Upset, Patsy throws the oriental lamp out the window and barely misses hitting her friend Harry, who wants to become a lawyer and then president. Patsy finds letters in the lamp that lead her to locating her mother, who arrives with her brother, who is now a judge. Harry now daydreams that he is president and Patsy is his first lady.

== Cast ==
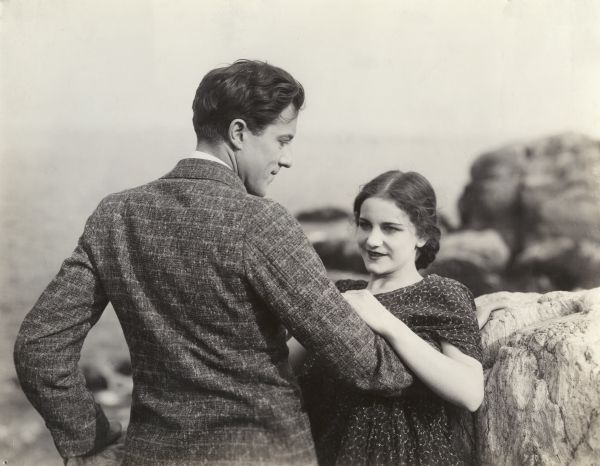
Robert Walker and Viola Dana in a publicity still for the 1917 film Aladdin's Other Lamp

- Viola Dana - Patricia Smith
- Robert Walker - Harry Hardy
- Augustus Phillips - Jehaunarana (a genie)
- Henry Hallam - Captain Barnaby
- Ricca Allen - Mrs. Duff
- Edward Elkas - Luke Stimson
- Nellie Grant - Mrs. Edmonton Smithfield
- Louis B. Foley - Judge Lawrence

== Background ==
At the time of Aladdin's Other Lamp, Viola Dana was married to the director of the film, John H. Collins. He had discovered her and first brought her to work at Edison Studios and then later to Metro Pictures.

== Reviews and reception ==
Hal Erickson wrote in The New York Times that, "the popular star/director combination of Viola Dana and John H. Collins had another winner on their hands". Variety offered the opinion in 1917 that "there is no dramatic tensity [sic] worthwhile in this film, it being one of those fantastical, fairy-changing, double exposure films that will make more of a hit with the kids than the grownups".The Oakland Tribune said the film contained “delicious humor and melting pathos” and opined that Willard Mack's play, The Dream Girl, “loses none of its charm by having been picturized”.

== Preservation ==
With no holdings located in archives, Aladdin's Other Lamp is considered a lost film.
