= The Five Dollar Baby =

1922 film by Harry Beaumont

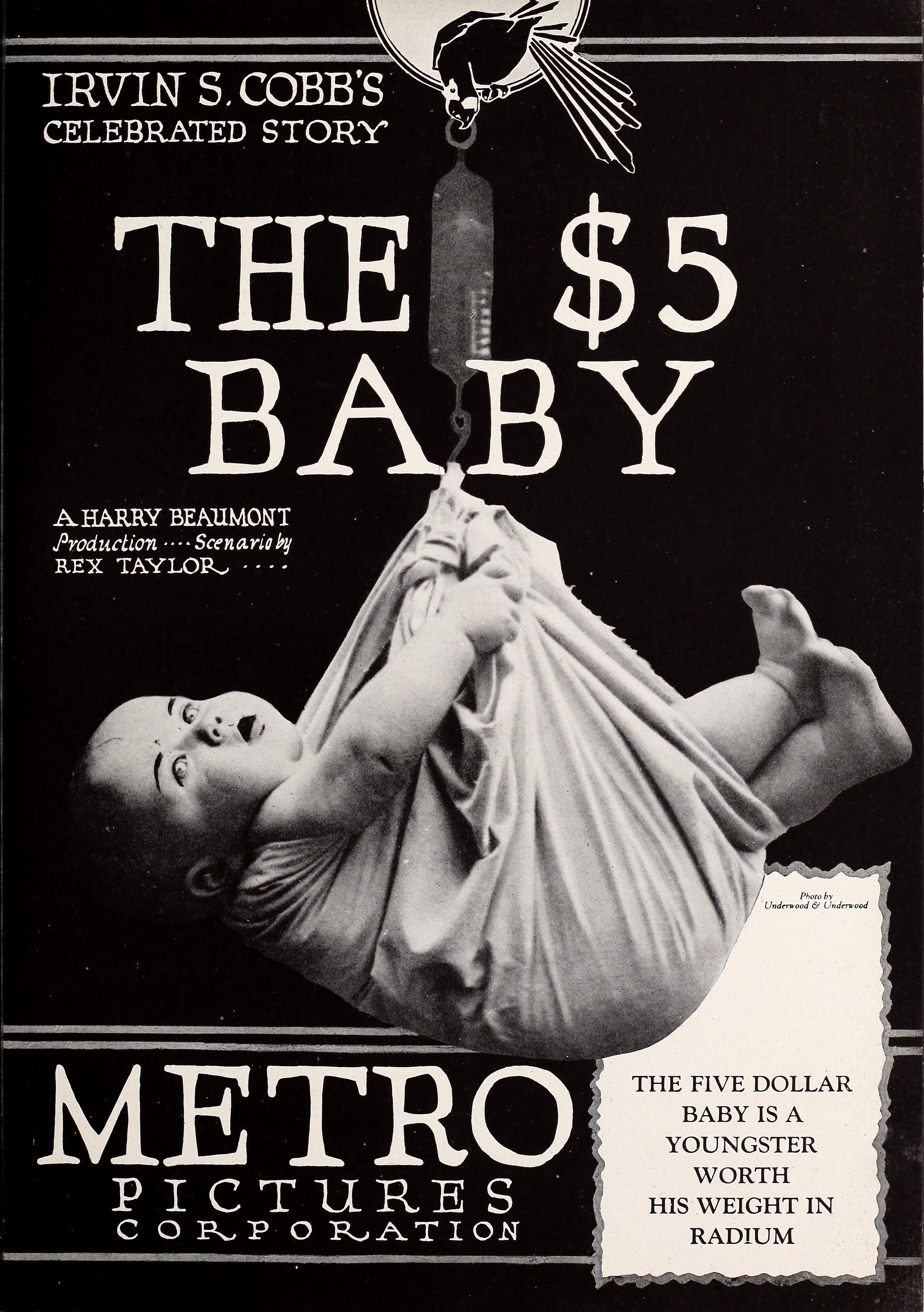
- Contemporary advertisement
- Directed by: Harry Beaumont
- Written by: Irvin S. Cobb; Rex Taylor
- Produced by: Harry Beaumont
- Starring: Viola Dana; Ralph Lewis; Otto Hoffman
- Cinematography: John Arnold
- Production company: Metro Pictures
- Distributed by: Metro Pictures
- Release date: June 25, 1922
- Running time: 60 minutes
- Country: United States
- Languages: Silent; English intertitles

The Five Dollar Baby is a 1922 American silent comedy film directed by Harry Beaumont and starring Viola Dana, Ralph Lewis and Otto Hoffman. A family hock their baby to a pawnbroker for five dollars.

== Cast ==
- Viola Dana as Ruth
- Ralph Lewis as Ben Shapinsky
- Otto Hoffman as The Solitary Kid
- John Harron as Larry Donovan
- Tom McGuire as Mr. Donovan
- Arthur Rankin as Bernie Riskin
- Marjorie Maurice as Esther Block
- Ernest Pasque as Isadore

== Bibliography ==
- Munden, Kenneth White. The American Film Institute Catalog of Motion Pictures Produced in the United States, Part 1. University of California Press, 1997.
