= Robert Walker (actor, born 1888) =

American actor (1888–1954)

Robert D. Walker
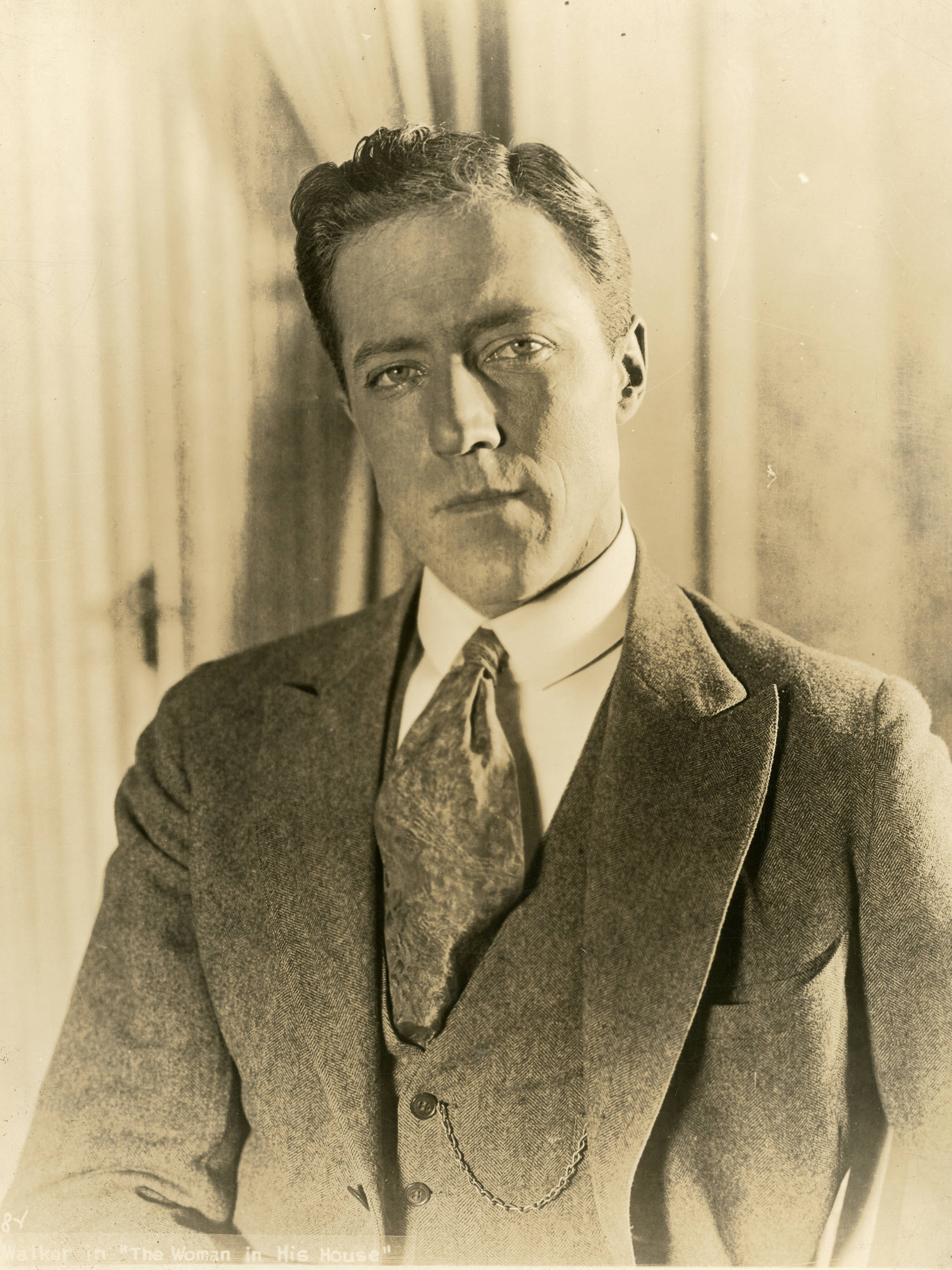
- Walker in 1921
- Born: Robert Donald Walker; June 18, 1888; Bethlehem, Pennsylvania, United States
- Died: March 4, 1954 (aged 65); Los Angeles, California, United States
- Occupation: Actor
- Years active: 1913–1953

Robert Donald Walker (June 18, 1888 – March 4, 1954) was an American film actor. He appeared in more than 200 films between 1913 and 1953. He was born in Bethlehem, Pennsylvania and died in Los Angeles.

== Selected filmography ==
- The Vampire's Trail (1914)
- Don Caesar de Bazan (1915) - Charles II of Spain
- The Way Back (1915) - Ralph Kingman
- The Ploughshare (1915) - Jack Strong, Jenny's brother
- Children of Eve (1915) – Bert Madison
- Caprice of the Mountains (1916) – Dick Deane
- The Light of Happiness (1916) – Reverend Clyde Harmon
- The Gates of Eden (1916) – William Bard
- The Cossack Whip (1916) – Alexis
- A Wife by Proxy (1917) – Norton Burbeck
- The Mortal Sin (1917) – George Anderson
- God's Law and Man's (1917) – Dr. Claude Drummond
- Lady Barnacle (1917) – George Morling
- Aladdin's Other Lamp (1917) – Harry Hardy
- The Girl Without A Soul (1917) – Hiram Miller
- Blue Jeans (1917) – Perry Bascom
- The Woman Between Friends (1918) – Jack Graylock
- At the Mercy of Men (1918) – Count Andreas
- The Fair Pretender (1918) – Harcourt
- The Whirlpool (1918) – Richard Brettner
- Miss Innocence (1918) – Henry Grant / Lawrence Grant
- The Woman Who Gave (1918) – Don Walcott
- The Sins of the Children (1918) – Graham Guthrie
- The Light (1919) – Etienne Desechette
- Burglar by Proxy (1919) – Harlan Graves
- The Merry-Go-Round (1919) – Charles Merryweather
- The Double Hold-Up (1919, Short) – Wade
- The Lion Man (1919, Serial) – John Cavendish
- Rouge and Riches (1920) – Jefferson Summers
- Shore Acres (1920) – Sam Warren
- The Woman in His House (1920) – Associate Doctor
- The Texan (1920) – Winthrop Endicott
- Isobel or The Trail's End (1920) – Pvt. Thomas Pelliter
- Prairie Trails (1920) – Winthrop Adams Endicott
- White Oak (1921) – Barbara's Brother
- Reckless Chances (1922) – Harry Allen
- Broad Daylight (1922) – The Scarab
- The Drug Traffic (1923) – Willie Shade
- Itching Palms (1923) – Dr. Peak
- Why Women Remarry (1923) – Dan Hannon's sister's second husband
- The Dancing Cheat (1924) – Bobby Norton
- Battling Brewster (1924) – George Wendell
- The Rip Snorter (1925) – Robert Willis
- The Riding Comet (1925) – Austin Livingston
- The Mystery Box (1925) – George Mason
- The Drug Store Cowboy (1925) – Gentleman Jack
- Billy the Kid (1925)
- The Outlaw's Daughter (1925) – Slim Cole
- Dangerous Fists (1925)
- Warrior Gap (1925) – Maj. Burleigh
- Tonio, Son of the Sierras (1925) – Lt. Booth
- A Daughter of the Sioux (1925) – Eagle Wing
- Law or Loyalty (1926) – Davis French
- Deuce High (1926) – Ranger McLeod
- The Silent Flyer (1926) – Henchman
- The Gallant Fool (1926) – Captain Turgemore
- Western Courage (1927) – Stephen Stanton
- Daring Deeds (1927) – Walter Sarles
- Roaring Fires (1927)
- The Cowboy Cavalier (1928)
- The Mysterious Airman (1928) – William Craft
- The Upland Rider (1928) – Bernt
- The Code of the Scarlet (1928) – Frank Morgan
- The Dream Melody (1929) – George Monroe
- The Voice from the Sky (1929) – Edgar Ballin
- Bar-L Ranch (1930) – Henchman
- The Fighting Legion (1930) – Ranger Tom Dawson
- Ridin' Law (1930) – Frank
- Canyon Hawks (1930) – Steve a.k.a. The Hawk
- The Phantom of the Desert (1930) – Steve – Henchman
- Breed of the West (1930) – Longrope Wheeler – Crooked Foreman
- Westward Bound (1930) – Steve – Henchman
- Little Caesar (1931) – Lorch Henchman (uncredited)
- West of Cheyenne (1931) – Henchman Nevada
- The Mystery Trooper (1931, Serial) – Mountie Sergeant (uncredited)
- Pueblo Terror (1931) – Bob Morgan
- Trapped (1931) – Policeman (uncredited)
- The Sign of the Wolf (1931, Serial) – Joe – Henchman
- The Kid from Arizona (1931) -The Crooked Foreman / Gang Leader
- The Vanishing Legion (1931) – Oil Co. Director Allen
- Headin' for Trouble (1931) – Butch Morgan – Henchman
- The Sunset Trail (1932) – Henchman (uncredited)
- The Lone Trail (1932) – Joe
- Hell Fire Austin (1932) – Soldier / Henchman (uncredited)
- The Man from New Mexico (1932) – Mort Snyder
- Border Devils (1932) – Cowhand (uncredited)
- The Scarlet Brand (1932) – Bill Morse
- Dynamite Ranch (1932) – Henchman (uncredited)
- Come On, Tarzan (1932) – Cowhand (uncredited)
- Between Fighting Men (1932) – Man Who Reports Murder (uncredited)
- The Devil Horse (1932, Serial) – Saunders [Ch. 6] (uncredited)
- Tombstone Canyon (1932) – Skeeter (uncredited)
- Phantom Thunderbolt (1933) – Henchman (uncredited)
- The Lone Avenger (1933) – Wounded Man (uncredited)
- King of the Arena (1933) – Deputy Bob (uncredited)
- The Fiddlin' Buckaroo (1933) – Deputy Harry (uncredited)
- The Trail Drive (1933) – Cattle-Buyer (uncredited)
- Strawberry Roan (1933) – Bat
- Twin Husbands (1933) – Burglar (uncredited)
- Jaws of Justice (1933) – Boone Jackson
- Sagebrush Trail (1933) – Henchman (uncredited)
- The Pecos Dandy (1934) – Unknown Role
- The Border Menace (1934) – Henchman (uncredited)
- I Believed in You (1934) – Detective (uncredited)
- Mystery Ranch (1934) – Deputy (uncredited)
- Monte Carlo Nights (1934) – Detective (uncredited)
- Rawhide Mail (1934) – Brown – the Buyer
- Rocky Rhodes (1934) – Deputy Mike (uncredited)
- Thunder Over Texas (1934) – Crooked Deputy Jenks (uncredited)
- The Prescott Kid (1934) – Deputy (uncredited)
- Terror of the Plains (1934) – Sheriff
- Mystery Mountain (1934, Serial) – Henchman (uncredited)
- Loser's End (1935)
- Million Dollar Haul (1935)
- Rough Riding Ranger (1935)
- Captured in Chinatown (1935)
- Midnight Phantom (1935)
- The Speed Reporter (1936)
- Hair-Trigger Casey (1936)
- Caryl of the Mountains (1936)
- Gunsmoke Ranch (1937)
- The Mysterious Pilot (1937, Serial)
- Two-Fisted Sheriff (1937)
- El Diablo Rides (1939)
- Pioneer Days (1940)
- I'll Sell My Life (1941)
