= Life's Whirlpool (1917 film) =

1917 film by Lionel Barrymore

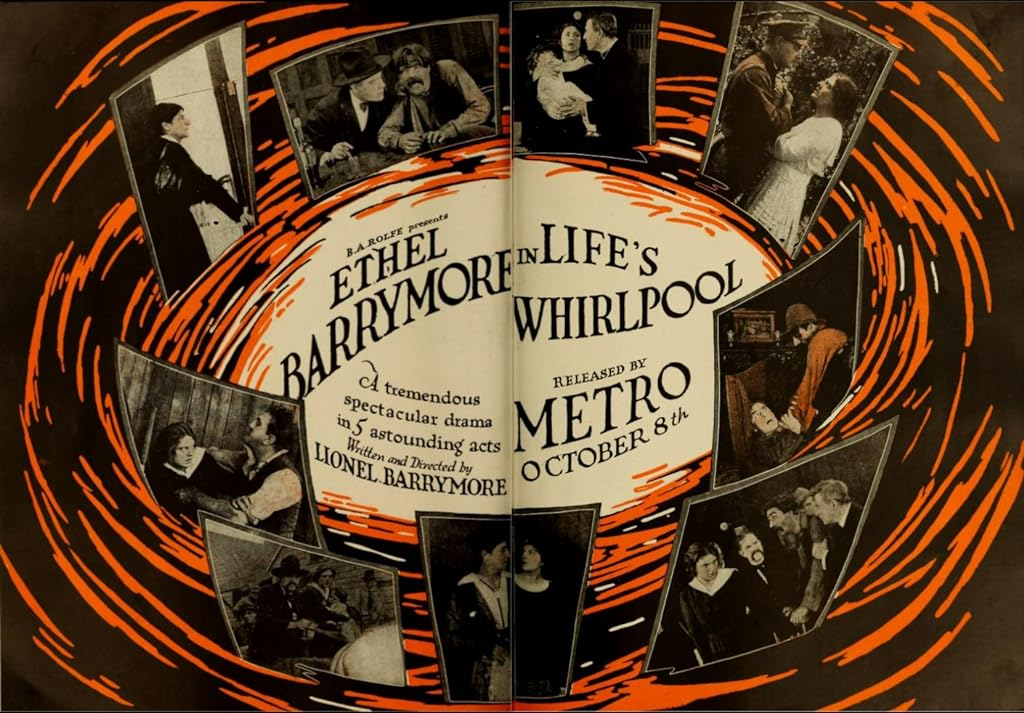
- Lobby poster
- Directed by: Lionel Barrymore
- Written by: Lionel Barrymore (story, scenario)
- Produced by: B. A. Rolfe; William A. Brady (executive producer)
- Starring: Ethel Barrymore
- Cinematography: John M. Bauman
- Distributed by: Metro Pictures
- Release date: November 9, 1917
- Running time: 5 reels
- Country: United States
- Language: Silent (English intertitles)

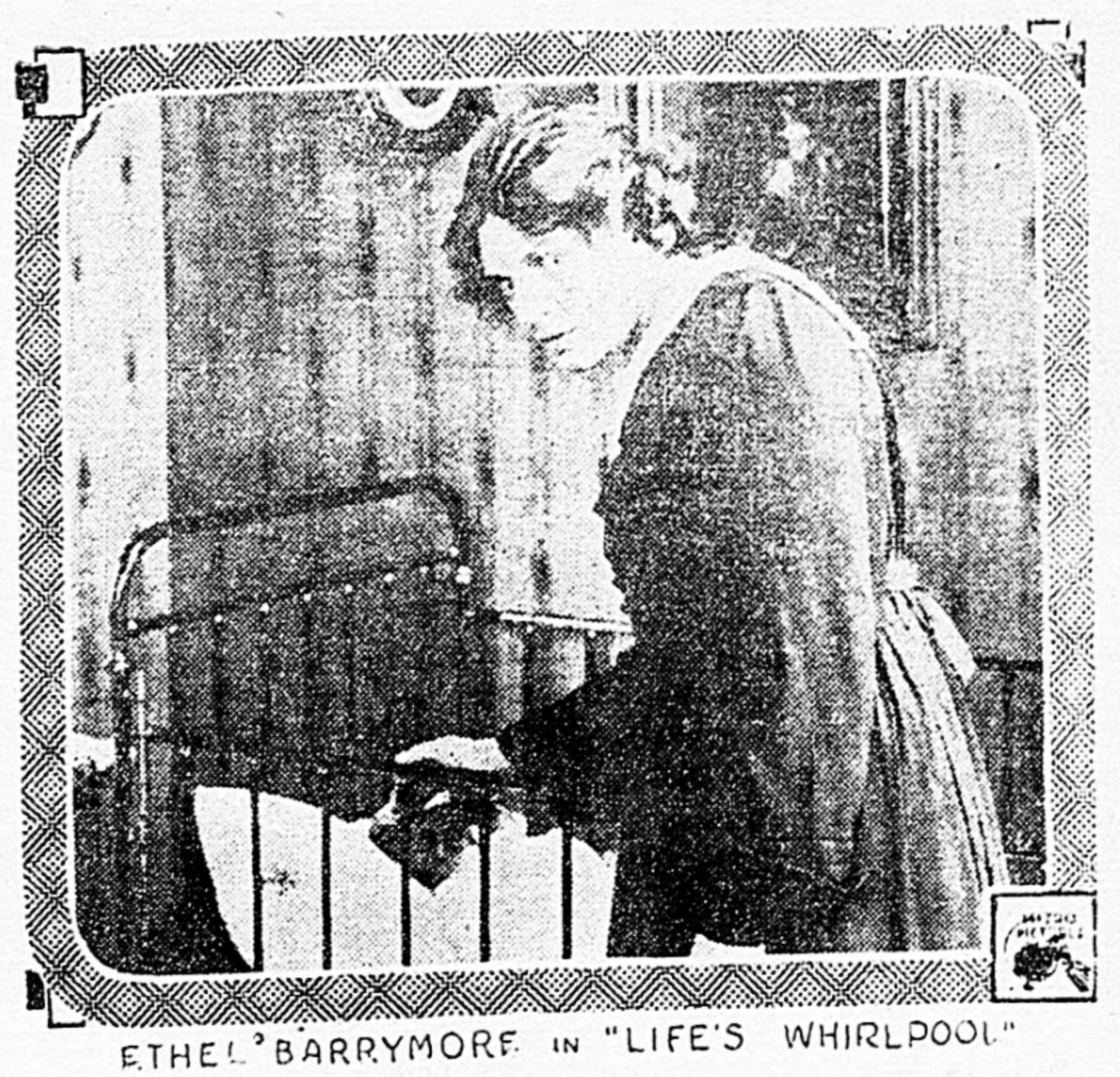
Contemporary newspaper publicity photograph

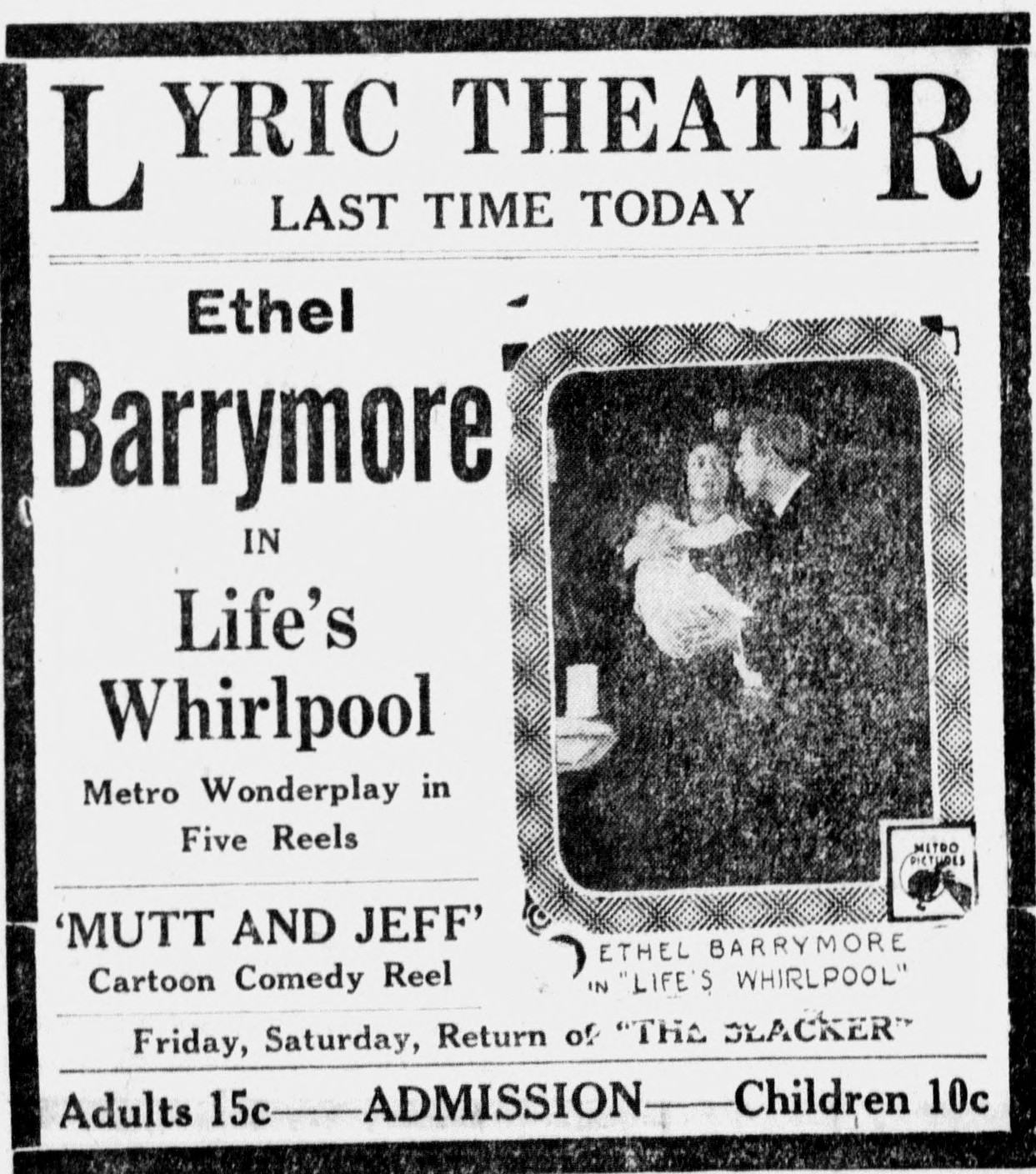
Newspaper advertisement

Life's Whirlpool is a 1917 American silent drama film written and directed by Lionel Barrymore with his sister Ethel Barrymore as the star. This is the brother and sister's only collaboration on a silent film as director and star.

This film should not be confused with Life's Whirlpool (also known as McTeague), the first film adaptation of Frank Norris's McTeague.

The Lionel Barrymore directed film was produced by B. A. Rolfe and released through Metro Pictures. Barrymore would return for a short time to directing films in the early sound era. This is now considered to be a lost film.

== Plot ==
As described in a film magazine, Esther (Barrymore), upon the death of her father, is advised by her kindly neighbors to get married. She is forced to sell the homestead and marries a domineering old miser named John Martin (Carrington), who lives with his maiden sister Ruth (Allen). Because she passes the time of day on the street with young men, her husband becomes jealous. He chokes her after he finds a letter from a former friend, Dr. Henry Grey (Hale), and she decides to leave him. While escaping with her son she is detained in a hut by a drunken farmer who tries to embrace her. She shoots him dead, and a posse arrests her for the death of her husband, who was found strangled in the library. However, the death confession of the real murderer clears her of her husband's death, and the return of her former friend from France completes her happiness.

== Cast ==
- Ethel Barrymore as Esther Carey
- Paul Everton as B.J. Hendrix
- Alan Hale as Dr. Henry Grey
- Reginald Carrington as John Martin
- Ricca Allen as Ruth Martin
- Frank Leigh as Dirk Kansket
- Walter Hiers as "Fatty" Holmes
- Harvey Bogart as Ezra Craddock
- Louis Wolheim as Unknown Role (uncredited)

== Reception ==
Like many American films of the time, Life's Whirlpool was subject to cuts by city and state film censorship boards. The Chicago Board of Censors required that three choking scenes be shortened.

== See also ==
- List of lost films
