= The Other Side of the Door (1916 film) =

1916 film by Tom Ricketts

- Directed by: Thomas Ricketts
- Written by: Clifford Howard
- Based on: The Other Side of the Door by Lucia Chamberlain
- Starring: Harold Lockwood; May Allison
- Music by: Joseph Bishara
- Distributed by: Mutual Film
- Release date: January 6, 1916
- Running time: Roughly 50 to 60 minutes
- Country: United States
- Languages: Silent film English intertitles

The Other Side of the Door is a 1916 American 5-reel silent romantic drama film directed by Tom Ricketts. Based on the novel of the same name by Lucia Chamberlain, it stars Harold Lockwood and May Allison.

== Plot ==
Set in the 19th century, the plot centers on a man (Harold Lockwood) who is falsely accused of murder. The Other Side of the Door was shot in Monterrey, Mexico.

== Cast ==
- Harold Lockwood as Johnny Montgomery
- May Allison
- Josephine Humphreys as Carlotta Valencia
- William Stowell
- Harry von Meter
- Dick La Reno
- Roy Stewart
- Walter Spencer
