= The Woman Pays =

- Advertisement for the film
- Directed by: Edgar Jones
- Screenplay by: Harry Chandlee
- Story by: Florence Gerald
- Based on: The Woman Pays by Florence Gerald
- Starring: Valli Valli; Marie Empress; Edward Brennan
- Cinematography: Carl Louis Gregory
- Production company: Columbia Pictures Corporation
- Distributed by: Metro Pictures Corporation
- Release date: November 15, 1915
- Running time: 5 reels
- Country: United States
- Language: Silent (English intertitles)

The Woman Pays is a 1915 lost drama film directed by Edgar Jones. It was distributed by Metro Pictures. The film is based on the play of the same name by Florence Gerald.

== Plot ==
Beth Coventry, society favorite and ward of a wealthy aunt, is beloved by three men: rich broker Philip Murdock; Marquis de Tourville, a polished, brilliant social lion; and poor but promising young banker John Langton. Following an impulse, coupled with the advice of her aunt, Mrs. Gordon, Beth accepts Langton and they are married.

Mrs. Connie Beverly, a young widow whose husband was Langton's best friend, mistakes Langton's kind interest in her for a deeper feeling and becomes infatuated with him, but in her determination to win his love she plans to ruin his home. John and Beth are living in a modest little home which they call "Love Cottage." Mrs. Beverly calls on Beth there and finds her reading letters which she had written to the Marquis before her marriage which he graciously returned. Her eyes fall on the pages of one letter in which Beth had written among other things, "Europe is so far away I must have time to consider your proposal." This letter Mrs. Beverly steals.

Murdock, too, is bent on breaking up the Langton home if possible, hoping yet to have Beth for his own. With Mrs. Beverly he makes an appeal to Beth's vanity, her one failing, and they succeed in getting her dissatisfied with her lot. Beth insists on John leaving the "Love Cottage" and moving into a pretentious home, where she proceeds to entertain lavishly and far beyond John's means. Murdock, posing as John's friend, induces him to speculate in stock. John is desperate as Beth tells him he will lose her love if he cannot supply her with an unreasonable allowance. He is finally driven to misappropriate bonds entrusted to his care by Beth's aunt.

The couple become estranged. John strives to recover the money he has lost in speculation, while Beth gives herself up entirely to social life. At the height of a great ball, lightning strikes a tree, it crashes through a window and falls upon Beth. She is severely wounded and a cut on her face mars her beauty for life. John is called, but Beth mistakes his look of pity for one of disgust. The next day she leaves to go in seclusion while a specialist attends her.

Mrs. Beverly tells John she has gone away with the Marquis, and to prove it shows him part of Beth's letter, written when she was considering De Tourville's proposal before her marriage. Beth's aunt dies several months later, leaving her fortune to her niece. Rather than face the disgrace which will attend the exposure of John's theft of the aunt's bonds, he determines to end his life at the "Love Cottage." Beth's lawyers notify her about the missing bonds. She protects John by saying she knows where they are, then she goes in search of him. Through a strange coincidence, they meet at the "Love Cottage," where they renew their first vows of love.

== Cast ==
- Valli Valli as Beth Coventry
- Marie Empress as Mrs. Connie Beverly
- Edward Brennan as Philip Murdoch
- John Bowers as John Langton
- Paul Lawrence as Marquis De Tourville
- Julia Hurley as Jane Gordon
- Mae De Metz as Christine

== Reception ==
A contemporary review in the Courier-Post praised Valli's performance. A contemporary review in the The Bryan-College Station Eagle praised the supporting cast in addition to Valli.

== Preservation ==
According to the National Film Preservation Board, the film is lost.
