= SS Calgaric =

1917 steam ocean liner

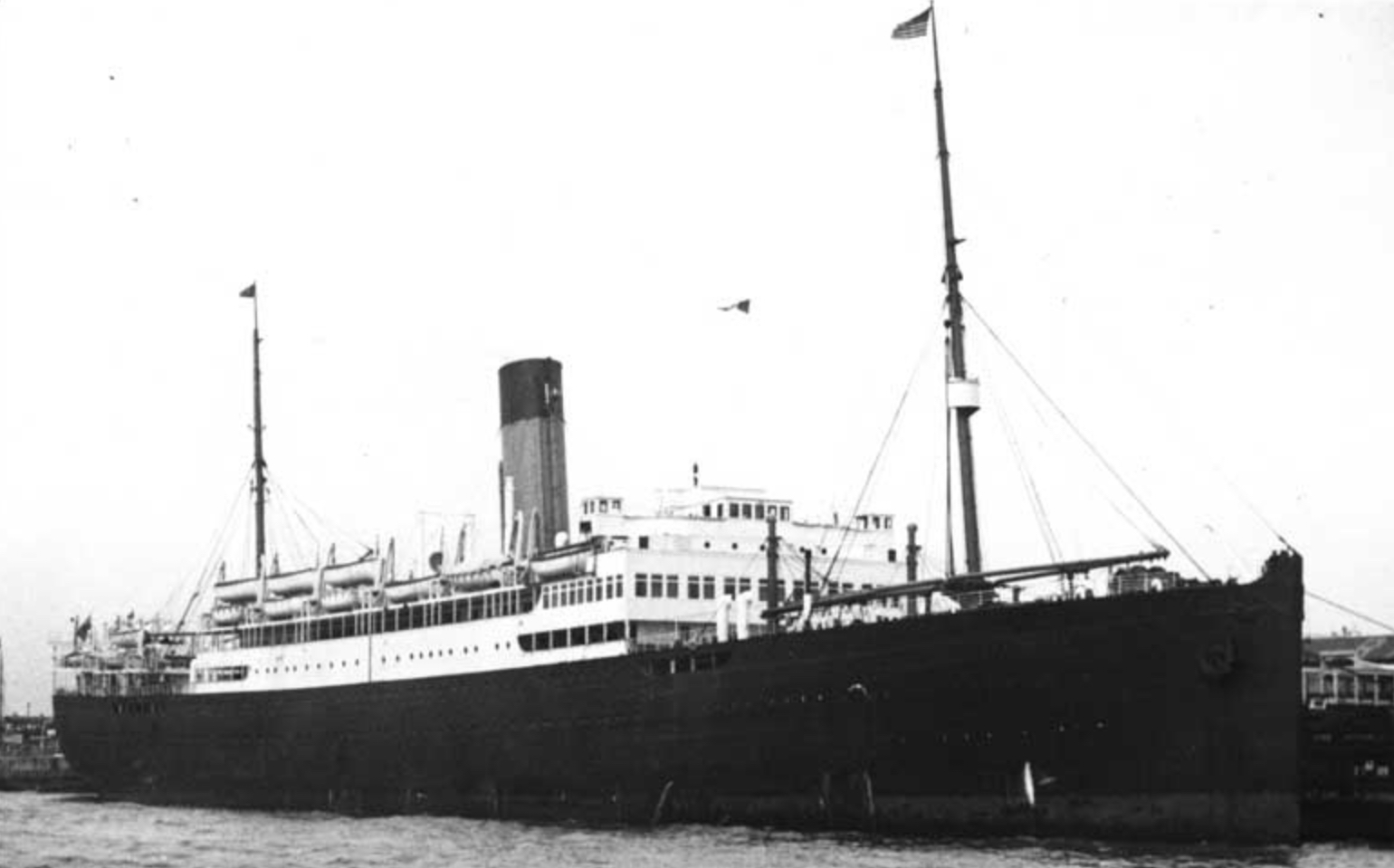
- The Calgaric in port

History

United Kingdom
- Name: 1917: Orca; 1927: Calgaric
- Namesake: 1917: orca; 1927: Calgary
- Owner: 1918: Pacific SN Line; 1923: Royal Mail Line; 1927: Oceanic SN Co
- Operator: 1918: Pacific SN Co; 1923: Royal Mail Steam Packet; 1927: * White Star Line
- Port of registry: London
- Builder: Harland and Wolff, Belfast
- Yard number: 442
- Launched: 5 April 1917
- Completed: 1917
- Acquired: 25 May 1918
- Maiden voyage: as an ocean liner: 3 January 1923
- Refit: 1922, 1927
- Identification: UK official number 140579; code letters JTLW (until 1933); call sign GLTR (1934)
- Fate: Scrapped 1934

General characteristics
- Type: 1918: cargo ship; 1922: ocean liner
- Tonnage: 16,063 GRT, 9,614 NRT
- Length: 550.3 ft (167.7 m)
- Beam: 67.3 ft (20.5 m)
- Draught: 35 ft 8 1/2 in (10.9 m)
- Depth: 43.0 ft (13.1 m)
- Decks: 2
- Installed power: 11,900 ihp
- Propulsion: 3 × screws; 2 × triple expansion engines; 1 × exhaust steam turbine
- Speed: 15 knots (28 km/h)
- Capacity: 1922 refit: 190 1st class, 220 2nd class, 480 3rd class; 1927 refit: 290 1st class, 550 tourist class, 330 3rd class; refrigerated cargo: 62,245 cubic feet (1,762.6 m^{3})
- Notes: sister ships: Orduña, Orbita

SS Calgaric was a steam ocean liner that was completed in 1917, assumed service in 1918 and scrapped in 1934. She was built for the Pacific SN Co Line as Orca. In 1923 she was transferred to the Royal Mail Line. In 1927 she was transferred to White Star Line and renamed Calgaric.

Orca was the third of three sister ships built for Pacific Steam. The first was Orduña, launched in 1913, and the second was Orbita, launched in 1914.

== Building ==
Harland & Wolff built Orca at Belfast during the First World War. She was yard number 442, built on slipway number 7. She was launched on 5 April 1917 and delivered to Pacific Steam on 25 May 1918.

Orca had the same dimensions and engines as Orduña and Orbita. Her registered length was 550.3 ft (167.7 m), her beam was 67.3 ft (20.5 m) and her depth was 43.0 ft (13.1 m). She also had the same propulsion system. She had three screws and a propulsion system called "combination machinery". Her port and starboard screws were each powered by a four-cylinder triple expansion engine. Exhaust steam from this pair of reciprocating engines drove a low-pressure turbine, which powered her middle screw. Between them the three engines developed a total of 11,900 ihp and gave Orca a speed of 15 knots (28 km/h).

== Pacific Steam Navigation Company ==
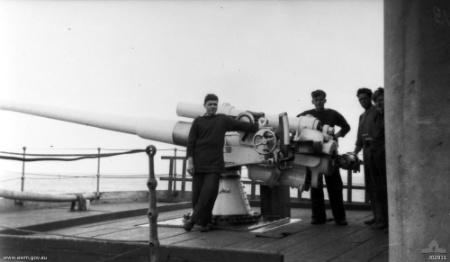
A QF 4.7-inch Mk V naval gun mounted on Orca's deck, when she was en route to Australia in March 1919

Orca was planned as an ocean liner for Pacific Steam's passenger service between Britain and the west coast of South America. However, for war service the Shipping Controller had her completed as a cargo ship, without her passenger superstructure.

Pacific Steam registered her in Liverpool. Her official number was 140579 and her code letters were JTLW.

== Royal Mail Steam Packet Company ==
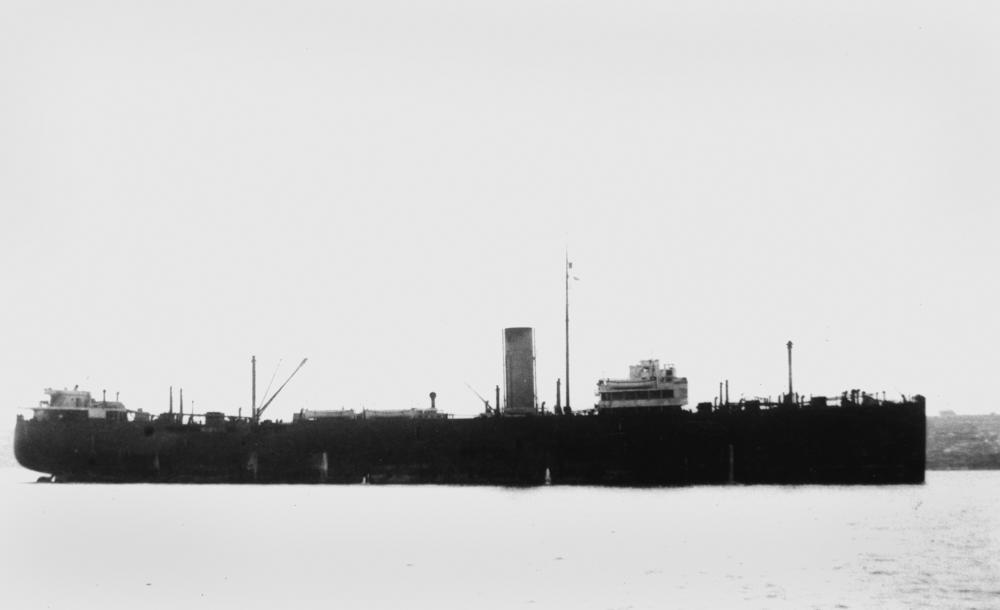
Orca as built in 1918, Pressed into war service only partly completed.

In 1921 Orca returned to Harland & Wolff for her passenger superstructure to be added. She was given berths for 890 passengers: 190 first class, 220 second class and 480 third class. Her public rooms included an entrance hall and First Class lounge decorated in Louis XVI style, a First Class dining room in early Georgian style, and a Smoking Room in Elizabethan style, complete with fireplace. To ascend or descend between decks, passengers had a choice of electric elevators, or a staircase lit by a domed skylight.

By the time the refit had been completed at the end of 1922, the Royal Mail Steam Packet Co had full control of Pacific Steam, and Orca and her two sisters were transferred to the RMSP fleet. She finally started her passenger maiden voyage, on 3 January 1923, sailing from Southampton via Hamburg to New York. Thence until March 1923 she operated two "off-season" cruises the Caribbean before reverting to liner service. A few years later, RMSP used Orca for the company's first "Great African Cruise".

== White Star Line ==
In 1926 RMSP took over White Star Line, and Orca was one of several RMSP ships transferred to the White Star fleet. She was refitted again, second class was renamed "tourist class", and her accommodation was increased to a total of 1,170 passengers: 290 first class, 550 tourist class and 330 third class. White Star ran services to Canada, so Orca was renamed Calgaric after the city of Calgary in Alberta.

On 4 May 1927 she started her first voyage for White Star, sailing from Liverpool to the east coast of Canada. She continued to do a lot of cruising as well as her liner work. In 1929 White Star transferred her from its Liverpool – Canada service to its London – Canada service.

The Great Depression that started in 1929 caused a Global slump in shipping. Calgaric was laid up from 1930 until 1933.

=== 1933 voyages ===
In June 1933 Calgaric returned to service for a single transatlantic crossing from Liverpool to Montreal. Thereafter she made a few cruises.

The Scout Association chartered Calgaric to take scoutmasters and Guide mistresses on a Baltic cruise in August 1933. Passengers included the Baden-Powell family, about 100 Scoutmasters, 475 Guide mistresses, and 80 non-Scouts and Guides – presumably their spouses. There were 85 men and 570 women – some of the Wolf Cub Akelas were women.

The cruise began from Southampton on Saturday 12 August and ended at Liverpool on 29 August. Her itinerary was Rotterdam, the Kiel Canal, Gdynia, Klaipėda, Riga, Tallinn, Helsinki, Stockholm, Oslo, the Pentland Firth and Oban.

== Fate ==
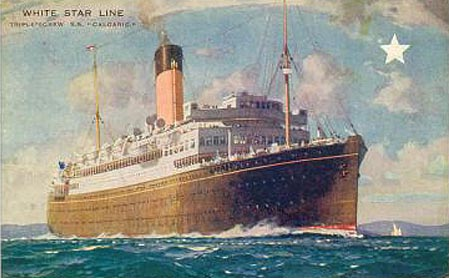
A post card of Calgaric

In 1934 Calgaric was assigned the new four-letter wireless telegraph call sign GLTR to replace her former code letters. On 10 May Cunard Line took over the ailing White Star to form Cunard-White Star Line. By then Calgaric had been laid up again. She was sold for scrap, and on Christmas Day 1934 she arrived at Rosyth in Scotland for Metal Industries, Limited to break her up.

== Bibliography ==
- Harnack, Edwin P (1930) [1903]. All About Ships & Shipping (4th ed.). London: Faber and Faber.
- Nicol, Stuart (2001). MacQueen's Legacy; A History of the Royal Mail Line. Vol. One. Brimscombe Port and Charleston, SC: Tempus Publishing. ISBN 0-7524-2118-2.
- Wilson, RM (1956). The Big Ships. London: Cassell & Co.
