= Lulu Valli =

British actress (1886–1964)

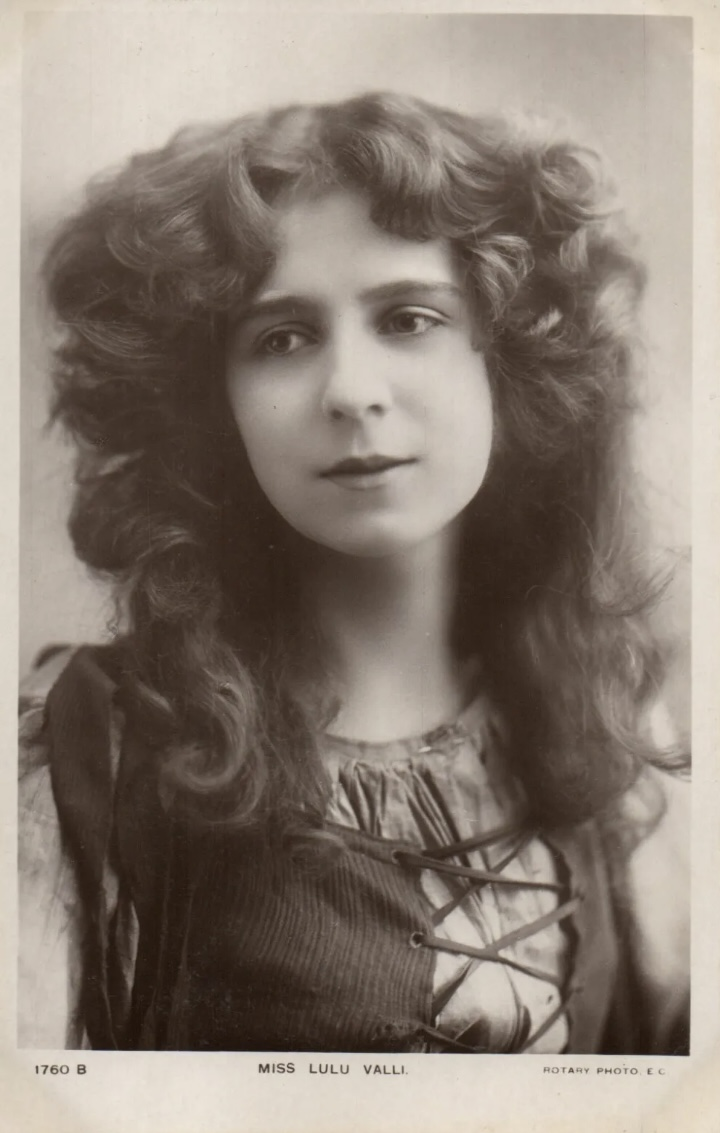
Lulu Valli

Lulu Valli (17 June 1886 – 12 May 1964) was a British actress, stage beauty and former child star of the theatre.

She was born in 1886 in St Pancras in London as Lulu Marianne Bertha Knust, one of three daughters and a son of German-born merchant Robert Alexander Knust (1861-before 1918) and Louisa Emily née Fowell (1862-1950). Her sisters Ida and Valli Valli were also actresses. Through her brother Cyril Alexander Eugene Knust MC (1897-1935), she was the aunt of Valli Knust, who, on her marriage to Prince Vsevolod Ivanovich Romanov became Princess Romanovsky Knust. Like her sisters, she spoke German as well as English and French, and could sing in Italian.

In her youth she often appeared with her sister Valli Valli in concerts, the two being in great demand at private parties, travelling nearly all over the country to appear together in "at homes". The sisters toured in Morocco Bound (1893). Lulu Valli acted as the good fairy Truth in the children's pantomime The House that Jack Built at the Opera Comique in 1894, while in 1897 she appeared at the Strand Theatre in The Prodigal Daughter. In 1903 she created the role of Miss Yost (the Typewriter) in the Edwardian musical comedy The School Girl at the Prince of Wales Theatre in London before playing Mamie Reckfeller in the Broadway production in 1904. Over the Christmas season of 1909 to 1910 she appeared as the Principal Boy in the pantomime Mother Hubbard at the Prince's Theatre, Bristol. During 1910 and 1911 she was in the play In Old Kentucky, again at the Prince's Theatre in Bristol. In 1914 she played in the revue Keep Smiling at The Empire Palace in London, in which "The main business of the revue is done by Lulu Valli, who is dainty and clever in a dozen ways..."

In 1914 she married the insurance manager Leslie Edward Parsons (1891-1970). In 1939 she was a housewife living in Amersham in Buckinghamshire with her husband and daughter Mary P. Parsons, (1919-). They also had two sons: Leslie Valli Parsons (1915-1997) and John Allen Cyril Parsons (1917-1997).

Lulu Valli died in Worthing in Sussex in 1964 and left an estate valued at £7,656.
