= Valli Valli =

British actress and singer

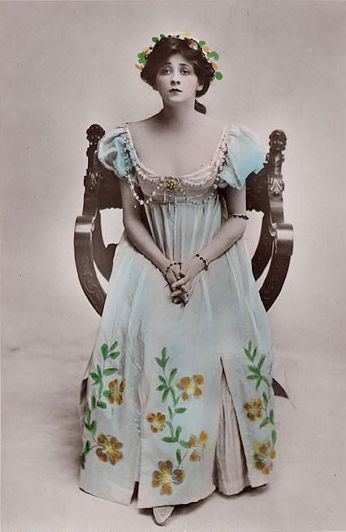
- Valli c. 1901
- Born: Valli Knust; February 11, 1882; Berlin, German Empire
- Died: November 4, 1927 (aged 45); Hampstead, London, United Kingdom
- Occupation: Actress
- Spouse: Louis Dreyfuss (m. 1917; died 1927)

Valli Valli, born Valli Knust (11 February 1882 – 4 November 1927) was a British musical comedy actress and silent film performer born in Berlin, Germany. She was descended from an old English family and lived most of her life in England. Her brother was a captain in the Royal Fusiliers, who fought for the British in France in World War I. Her sisters Lulu (1887–1964) and Ida were both actresses, who used the stage names Lulu Valli and Ida Valli. Her brother-in-law, Philip Curtiss (Ida's husband), wrote Mummers in Mufti in 1921. She also had a brother named Cyril Alexander Eugene Knust (1897–1935).

== Early years and stage work ==
Valli was the daughter of merchant Robert Alexander Knust (1861 – c. 1918) and Louisa Emily née Fowell (1862–1950). She was educated in London and Paris. As a twelve-year-old, she made her first stage appearance in Gentle Ivy (1894) at Terry's Theatre in London. She demonstrated her theatrical skill in Berlin in 1895 with a successful run in the musical comedy Morocco Bound. She returned to London's Drury Lane Theatre, performing the role of the dancing doll in a pantomime version of Cinderella the following Christmas.

A strikingly beautiful woman, Valli played mostly in England thereafter, appearing in The Queen of Hearts, Purple Road and The Duke's Motto, among other pieces. She toured the United States a number of times. Her first American tour was in the operetta Veronique in 1905, where she played the part of Sophie. In London in 1907, when she played Polly Love in a revival of The Christian at the Lyceum Theatre. She appeared in 1908 in the London musical Kitty Grey. This was followed the next autumn by an appearance in the long-running American version of The Dollar Princess (1909). Valli had the role of Alice Cowder. In 1916, she participated in George M. Cohan's The Cohan Revue. Her last New York City performance was in Miss Millions in 1919 at the Punch & Judy Theatre.

== Films and later years ==
Valli made four films in the years 1915 and 1916. One of these is The Turmoil, an adaptation of a Booth Tarkington novel, in which she played Mary Vertrees, a lady with an aristocratic bearing. Her other screen credits are for appearances as Mary Page in The High Road (1915), Beth Coventry in The Woman Pays (1915), and Marian Delmar in Her Debt of Honor (1916). In 1917, she married Louis Dreyfus, head of the music publishing house Harms, Day and Hunter, later owner of Chappell & Co. and later a theatrical producer.

Valli died at her home in Hampstead, London, in 1927 at the age of 45, survived by her husband and daughter, Valli Victoria Dreyfus (1918–1992).
