= SS Orduña =

Ocean liner (1913–1951)

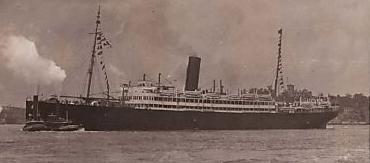
- Tug towing SS Orduña to sea

History

United Kingdom
- Name: SS Orduña
- Owner: Pacific Steam Navigation Company
- Operator: Cunard Line, Royal Mail Steam Packet Company, Pacific Steam Navigation Company
- Port of registry: (United Kingdom) Liverpool
- Route: North Atlantic
- Builder: Harland and Wolff, Belfast
- Launched: 2 October 1913
- Maiden voyage: 19 February 1914
- Out of service: November 1950
- Fate: Scrapped 1951 at Dalmuir, Scotland

General characteristics
- Type: Ocean liner
- Tonnage: 15,507 GRT
- Length: 550.3 feet (167.7 m)
- Beam: 67.3 feet (20.5 m)
- Draught: 35 feet 10 1/4 inches (10.93 m)
- Depth: 43.0 feet (13.1 m)
- Propulsion: Triple-expansion engines + low-pressure turbine; Triple screw
- Speed: 15 knots (28 km/h)
- Capacity: 896 passengers

SS Orduña or Orduna was an ocean liner built in 1913–14 by Harland and Wolff in Belfast for the Pacific Steam Navigation Company. After two voyages she was chartered to Cunard Line. In 1921 she went to the Royal Mail Steam Packet Company, then being resold to the PSNCo in 1926. Her sister ships were Orbita and Orca.

She provided transatlantic passenger transport, measured approximately 15,500 gross register tons, and was 550.3 ft x 67.3 ft.

== History ==
=== First World War ===
During the First World War the Orduña was chartered to run the Liverpool to New York passenger service for Cunard, which she would do until 1919.

In January 1915 Orduña rescued the Russian crew of the sailing ship Loch Torridon, which had sprung a leak while transporting timber off the west coast of Ireland. Later in July 1915, en route to New York City, Orduña was targeted by a U-boat. The torpedo, which was spotted by Captain Taylor, missed the ship, which arrived safely.

Orduña was also registered as an auxiliary cruiser during the war, and from late 1915 was used as a troop transport, running from Halifax, Canada to Liverpool, sometimes using a fake gun. With the entry of America into the war, it carried notables such as Quentin Roosevelt on board.

In 1918 Orduña collided with the 4,406-ton steamer Konakry, carrying a cargo of ballast from Queenstown to Trinidad. Konakry was lost in the accident.

=== Between the wars ===
In 1919 the British actress Marie Empress went missing after being seen in her cabin the day before the Orduña reached New York. Her disappearance remained a mystery and she was declared dead in 1921.

In April 1923 the ship was involved in another rescue, transporting the crew of the barquentine Clitha, which had been abandoned and set on fire, to England after they had been rescued by the schooner Jean Campbell.

In 1925, Dean James E. Lough of the Extra-Mural Division of the New York University chartered Orduña for the transport of 213 students to France, with lectures taking place on board.

In 1938 the Orduña was used for the third and final 'Peace Cruise', carrying 460 Scouters and Guiders, including Robert and Olave Baden-Powell, and their daughter Heather, on a cruise to Iceland, Norway, Denmark and Belgium. Orduna left Liverpool on 8 August, returning on 25 August via Dover.

Robert Baden-Powell was too ill to leave the ship during the voyage, but parties of local Scouts visited him on the ship at most of the stops, while the Scouters and Guiders on the ship took the opportunity to tour local landmarks and attend receptions. During the stop at Reykjavík on Thursday, 11 August, during which Orduña moored beside the German cruiser Emden, a party from the Scouts of Iceland brought some rock on board so that Baden-Powell could still 'set foot in Iceland'. The Orduña called at Trondheim, Norway, on 15 August, Copenhagen, Denmark on 18 August, and Belgium on Sunday 21 August, before returning to England. In September 1938 she was at Nassau, Bahamas and Kingston, Jamaica

=== Second World War ===
While the 1939 "Voyage of the Damned" affair, where German Jewish refugees were refused entry into Cuba, the United States and Canada, may be best known for the 937 passengers aboard the MS St. Louis, it also included the fate of passengers aboard the Orduña. Cuban authorities accepted only 48 of Orduña's passengers, all of whom held landing permits, but refused permission for the remaining 72 passengers to land in Havana.

On 12 August 1940, she sailed from Liverpool, arriving in Nassau 30 August, with a privately organised party of 16 children from Belmont Preparatory school, Hassocks Sussex. It was part of a wider Government children's evacuation programme Children's Overseas Reception Board during World War II, when the prospect of imminent invasion threatened Britain.

In 1941, with the need for military transport in the war, she was put into service by the British government as a troopship. Another task during the Second World War was that of an evacuation transport.

In the autumn of 1945 the Orduña brought back Prisoners of War and internees from the Far East, landing at Princes Landing Stage in Liverpool on 19 October. A memorial to the ships involved in the repatriation was unveiled on the Liverpool waterfront on 15 October 2011.

=== Post-Second World War ===
In 1947 conditions for troops returning from Port Said in Egypt on the Orduña, said to include overcrowding and poor food, were raised with the Secretary of State for War. One of these voyages from Port Said, arriving in Liverpool on 7 July 1947, also carried many returning members of the Palestine Police Force.

== Demise ==
Orduna was decommissioned and laid up in November 1950 and dismantled the following year in Dalmuir, Scotland.
