= Waco Female College =

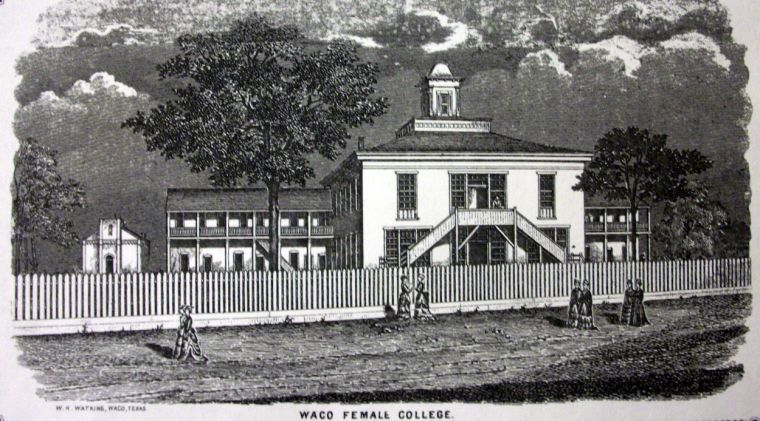
Waco Female College original building

Waco Female College is a former private college in Waco, Texas, affiliated with the Methodist Episcopal Church. It opened in 1857 and closed in 1895; the site was bought by Add-Ran Christian University, a precursor of Texas Christian University.

== History ==
Waco Female College received a charter in 1854 and began operations in September 1857, initially under the supervision of a local pastor, Franklin Collett Wilkes. William McKendree Lambden became its first president, followed by Pinckney Downs and in 1859 by Ferdinand Plummer Maddin, who was also the county tax assessor and collector and served as president for ten years. Samuel Pascal Wright became president in the late 1870s. The Texas legislature granted the college another charter on February 11, 1860, as a non-sectarian institution consolidating Waco Female Seminary and Waco Female Academy; it may also have been initially known as Waco Union Female Institute, which was chartered on February 16, 1858.

Waco Female College was initially located on a square site that had been designated for a woman's college in the initial 1849 plat of Waco. A building was erected there in 1859–1860, but around 1892 the college moved to a site of about 13½ acres on the outskirts of the town. The college began with preparatory (high school) and collegiate departments; facilities for boarders were added in 1872, and kindergarten and primary departments in 1883. Enrollment that year was 126, and rose to 202 in 1893. In 1890 it was listed as one of three "institutions for the superior instruction of women" in Texas.

The college charged $25 tuition per term, a $5 advance diploma fee, and $70 for boarding. It offered courses in penmanship, map-drawing, ancient and modern geography, American and world history, "evidences of Christianity", mental "phylosophy", trigonometry, astronomy, geology, botany, physiology, English, rhetoric, and Latin; all of these were required to complete a degree, except that French, German, art, or music could be substituted for Latin. Students were also required to take "physical culture".

The college closed in 1895 for financial reasons; it may have been over-extended by its recent expansion and affected by the 1893 financial depression in the US. Add-Ran Christian University, a precursor of Texas Christian University, then bought the buildings and 15 acres of land from the Christian Church of Waco, which added a cash incentive and moving funds. The university operated there until a fire in 1910, after which it relocated to Fort Worth.

== Notable people ==
- Florence Gerald (1858–1942), actress: former elocution teacher
- Mattie Minor Wright (1866–1948), first consecrated deaconess of the Methodist Episcopal Church South: alumna
