= SS Orbita =

Ocean liner (1914–1950)

- SS Orbita in 1916

History

United Kingdom
- Name: SS Orbita
- Owner: Pacific Steam Navigation Company
- Operator: Cunard Line, Royal Mail Steam Packet Company, Pacific Steam Navigation Company
- Port of registry: (United Kingdom) Liverpool
- Route: North Atlantic service
- Builder: Harland and Wolff, Belfast
- Yard number: 440
- Launched: 7 July 1914
- Completed: 31 July 1915
- Maiden voyage: 26 September 1919
- In service: 1915
- Out of service: 1950
- Identification: Official Number 137467
- Fate: Scrapped, 1950, in Newport

General characteristics
- Type: Ocean liner
- Tonnage: 15,495 GRT
- Length: 550.3 feet (167.7 m)
- Beam: 67.3 feet (20.5 m)
- Draught: 35 feet 10 1/4 inches (10.93 m)
- Depth: 43.0 feet (13.1 m)
- Propulsion: Triple-expansion engines + low-pressure turbine; Triple screw
- Speed: 15 knots (28 km/h)
- Capacity: 896 passengers

SS Orbita was an ocean liner built in 1913–14 by Harland & Wolff in Belfast for the Pacific Steam Navigation Company. She was launched on Tuesday, 7 July 1914. Her sister ships were SS Orduna and SS Orca.

She provided transatlantic passenger transport, measured about 15,500 gross register tons, and was 550.3 ft x 67.3 ft.

== History ==
From 1921 to 1923 the Orbita was chartered to operate the Royal Mail's United Kingdom – New York City service. In 1923 she was transferred to Royal Mail ownership, remaining with them for three years before reverting to the Pacific Steam Navigation Company.

Between 1946 and 1950 the Orbita was used as a troopship and to transport emigrants to Australia and New Zealand. The Orbita was an important part of the history of multiracialism in the United Kingdom, arriving with the second group of immigrants from the West Indies (after the Empire Windrush). The passengers were part of the first large group of West Indian immigrants to the UK after the Second World War.

=== War service ===
In 1941, during the Second World War, she was again requisitioned as a troop ship.

On 18 December 1940 she departed as part of a convoy from Liverpool with 530 RAF personnel bound for Port Elizabeth, South Africa. The personnel were sent to set up 42 Air School, as part of the Joint Air Training Scheme set up by Prime Minister Jan Smuts and Air Chief Marshal Sir Robert Brooke Popham to train British and South African airmen. South Africa provided all the ground facilities (airfields, hangars, accommodation, etc.), and Britain supplied the training personnel, aircraft, and training equipment.

En-route the convoy was shelled by the German cruiser Admiral Hipper at 07.00 hours on Christmas Day 1940, and the convoy scattered. Although gun flashes were seen through fog by the RAF contingent, only one ship was hit, which returned to Gibraltar for repairs. The convoy re-assembled at Freetown, Sierra Leone, where supplies were taken on. "Orbita" arrived in Port Elizabeth on 23 January 1941.

The ship transported 268 men of the first unit of British Honduran Foresters from Durban via Trinidad and Halifax, Nova Scotia, to the Port of Liverpool on 12 September 1941 (Board of Trade: Commercial and Statistical Department and successors: Inwards Passenger Lists. Kew, Surrey, England). She continued as a troop ship until at least 1949.

== Demise ==
The SS Orbita was dismantled in October 1950 in Newport, South Wales.
