= John Goldsworthy =

British actor

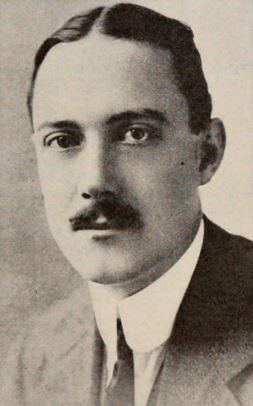
- Born: 28 April 1884; London, United Kingdom
- Died: 10 July 1958 (aged 74); Los Angeles, California, United States
- Occupation: Actor
- Years active: 1915–1951 (film)

John Goldsworthy (1884–1958) was a British-born stage and film actor. After emigrating to the United States he was active on Broadway appearing in a variety of plays, as well as several musicals. During the silent era he appeared in supporting roles in American films. Later in the 1940s he returned to the cinema, now playing mainly small, uncredited parts. His final film was MGM's The Prisoner of Zenda (1951).

== Selected filmography ==
- A Yellow Streak (1915)
- The Red Widow (1916)
- A Corner in Cotton (1916)
- Her Debt of Honor (1916)
- Thou Shalt Not Steal (1917)
- Life's Greatest Problem (1918)
- The Career of Katherine Bush (1919)
- The Divorcee (1919)
- Even as Eve (1920)
- The Sporting Duchess (1920)
- Notoriety (1922)
- Marriage Morals (1923)
- Hangover Square (1945)
- Confidential Agent (1945)
- The Shanghai Cobra (1945)
- Bedlam (1946)
- The Dark Corner (1946)
- The Verdict (1946)
- The Imperfect Lady (1947)
- Moss Rose (1947)
- Love from a Stranger (1947)
- The Paradine Case (1947)
- 13 Lead Soldiers (1948)
- The Emperor Waltz (1948)
- The Woman in White (1948)
- The Secret of St. Ives (1949)
- Nancy Goes to Rio (1950)
- Rogues of Sherwood Forest (1950)
- The Desert Fox (1951)
- The Prisoner of Zenda (1951)

== Bibliography ==
- Connelly, Robert B. The Silents: Silent Feature Films, 1910-36, Volume 40, Issue 2. December Press, 1998.
- Bordman, Gerald Martin. American Musical Theatre: A Chronicle. Oxford University Press, 1992.
- Dietz, Dan. The Complete Book of 1910s Broadway Musicals. Rowman & Littlefield, 2021.
