= The High Road (1915 film) =

- Directed by: John W. Noble
- Written by: Edward Sheldon (play)
- Produced by: Rolfe Photoplays
- Starring: Valli Valli
- Distributed by: Metro Pictures
- Release date: September 22, 1915
- Running time: 5 reels
- Country: United States
- Language: Silent

The High Road is a lost 1915 silent film drama starring Valli Valli and directed by John W. Noble. It was produced by Rolfe Photoplays and distributed through Metro Pictures. The film was based on a 1912 play written by Edward Sheldon and starring Mrs. Fiske.

== Cast ==
- Valli Valli as Mary Page
- Frank Elliott as Allen Wilson
- C. H. Brenon as Barnes
- Fred L. Wilson
