= German cruiser Emden =

Light cruiser

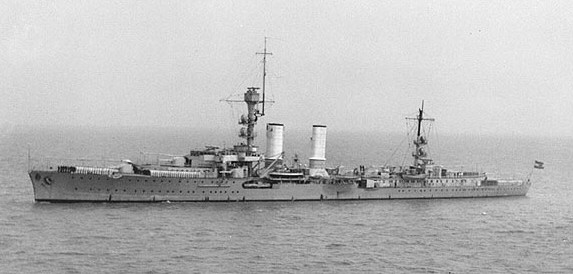
- Emden in China, 1931

Class overview
- Preceded by: FK proposals (planned); Cöln class (actual)
- Succeeded by: Königsberg class

History

Germany
- Name: Emden
- Namesake: Emden
- Ordered: 1921
- Laid down: 8 December 1921
- Launched: 6 January 1925
- Commissioned: 15 October 1925
- Fate: Scuttled 3 May 1945, scrapped 1949

General characteristics
- Type: Light cruiser
- Displacement: Standard: 5,300 long tons (5,400 t); Full load: 6,990 long tons (7,100 t)
- Length: 155.1 m (508 ft 10 in)
- Beam: 14.2 m (46 ft 7 in)
- Draft: 5.3 m (17 ft 5 in)
- Installed power: 10 × water-tube boilers; 46,500 shp (34,700 kW)
- Propulsion: 2 × steam turbines; 2 screw propellers
- Speed: 29.5 knots (54.6 km/h; 33.9 mph)
- Range: 6,700 nmi (12,400 km; 7,700 mi) at 15 knots (28 km/h; 17 mph)
- Boats & landing craft carried: 6
- Complement: 19–30 officers; 445–653 enlisted men
- Armament: 8 × 15 cm (5.9 in) SK L/45 guns; 3 × 8.8 cm (3.5 in) SK L/45 guns; 4 × 50 cm (20 in) torpedo tubes
- Armor: Belt: 50 mm (2 in); Deck: 40 mm (1.6 in); Conning tower: 100 mm (3.9 in)

Emden was a light cruiser built for the German Navy (Reichsmarine) in the early 1920s. She was the only ship of her class and was the first large warship built in Germany after the end of World War I. She was built at the Reichsmarinewerft in Wilhelmshaven; her keel was laid down in December 1921 and her completed hull was launched in January 1925. Emden was commissioned into the fleet in October 1925. Her design was heavily informed by the restrictions of the Treaty of Versailles and the dictates of the Allied disarmament commission. Displacement was capped at 6,000 long tons (6,100 t), though like all German warships built in the period, Emden exceeded the size limitations. She was armed with a main battery of surplus 15 cm (5.9 in) guns left over from World War I, mounted in single gun turrets, as mandated by the Allied powers. She had a top speed of 29 knots (54 km/h; 33 mph).

Emden spent the majority of her career as a training ship; in the inter-war period, she conducted several world cruises to train naval cadets, frequently visiting East Asia, the Americas, and the Indian Ocean region. In 1937 and 1938, she briefly participated in the non-intervention patrols during the Spanish Civil War. At the outbreak of war, she laid minefields off the German coast and was damaged by a British bomber that crashed into her. She participated in the invasion of Norway in April 1940 as part of the force that captured the Norwegian capital at Oslo.

The ship thereafter resumed training duties in the Baltic Sea. These lasted with minor interruptions until September 1941, when she was assigned to the Baltic Fleet and tasked with supporting German operations during the invasion of the Soviet Union. Training duties resumed in 1942 and lasted until late 1944, when she took part in minelaying operations in the Skagerrak. Damaged in a grounding accident in December 1944, she went to Königsberg for repairs. In January 1945, she participated in the evacuation of East Prussia to escape the advancing Soviet Army. While undergoing repairs in Kiel, Emden was repeatedly damaged by British bombers and later run aground outside the harbor to prevent her from sinking. In the final days of the war, she was blown up to prevent her capture. The wreck was ultimately broken up in place by 1950.

== Design ==
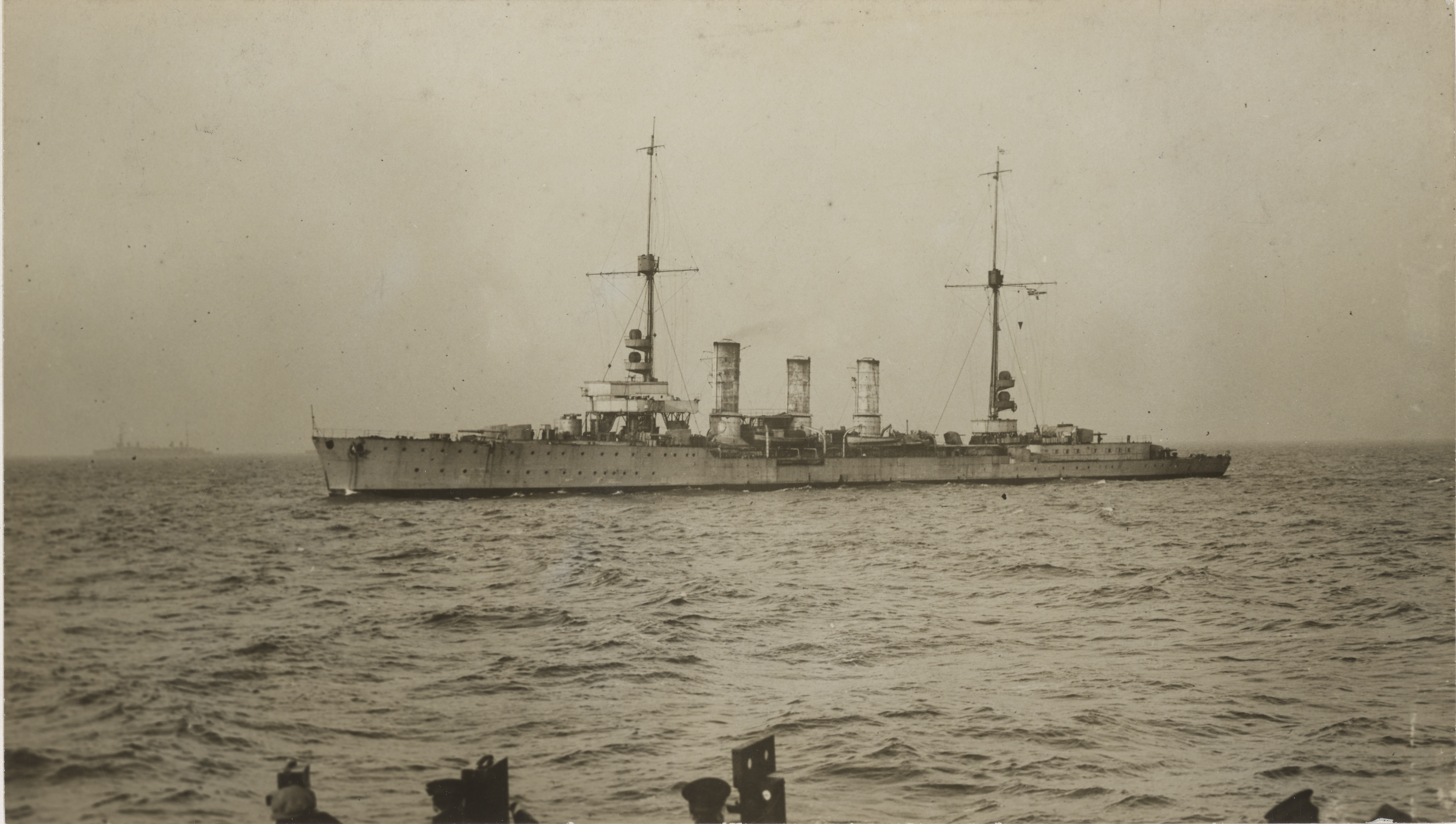
SMS Karlsruhe, the basis of Emden's design

According to Article 181 of the Treaty of Versailles, the treaty that ended World War I, the German Navy was permitted only six light cruisers. Article 190 limited new cruiser designs to 6,000 long tons (6,100 t) and prohibited new construction until the vessel to be replaced was at least twenty years old. Since the six cruisers that Germany retained had been launched between 1899 and 1902, the oldest ships—Niobe, Amazone, Nymphe, Thetis, and Medusa—could be replaced immediately. Design work on the first new light cruiser, ordered as "Ersatz Niobe", began in 1921.

The Navy hoped to finish the ship as quickly as possible and to keep costs to a minimum, and so requested permission from the Naval Inter-Allied Commission of Control to use steam turbines, boilers, and conning towers from scrapped vessels to complete Ersatz Niobe. The NIACC rejected the request. The Navy also hoped to use an armament of four twin-gun turrets for the new ship. The NIACC rejected the twin-turret design, but allowed the use of 15 cm (5.9 in) guns from existing stocks of spare barrels. Nominally within the 6,000-ton limit of the Versailles Treaty, Emden in fact exceeded the restriction by almost 1,000 long tons (1,000 t) fully loaded. In 1923, after work on Emden had already begun, the Germans proposed using the definition for standard displacement adopted in the Washington Naval Treaty of 1922, which was significantly less than full-load displacement. The Allied powers approved the change, and thus Emden, which had a standard displacement of just under the 6,000-ton limit, was retroactively made legal.

The ship was based on the blueprints from the late-war cruiser Karlsruhe, primarily due to personnel shortages in the design staff and the closure of the Navy's Ship Testing Institute, and the blueprints for Karlsruhe were still available. Completed to a dated design, she proved to be something of a disappointment in service, primarily owing to her weak broadside of just six 15 cm guns. Nevertheless, the ship incorporated major advances over the earlier designs, including large-scale use of welding in her construction and a significantly more efficient propulsion system that gave her a cruising radius fifty percent larger than that of the older ships, which proved to be quite useful on the extended training cruises of the 1920s and 1930s.

=== General characteristics ===
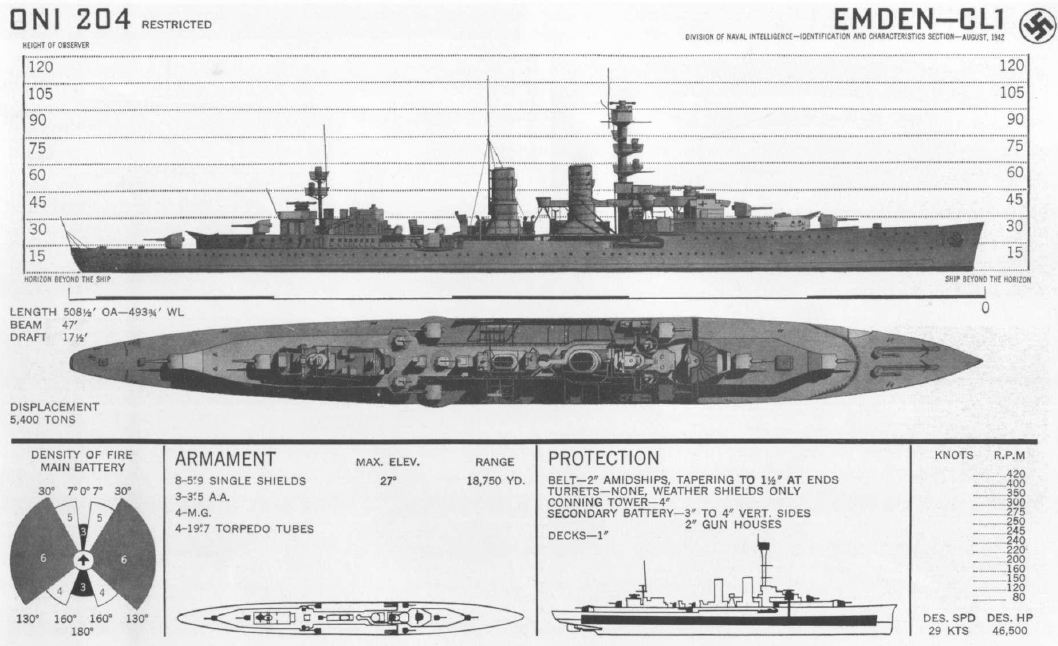
Recognition drawing of Emden from the Office of Naval Intelligence

Emden was 150.5 meters (494 ft) long at the waterline and 155.1 m (509 ft) long overall. She had a beam of 14.2 m (47 ft) and a designed draft of 5.3 m (17 ft); at standard load, the draft was 5.15 m (16.9 ft), and at combat load the draft increased to 5.93 m (19.5 ft). Her designed displacement was 5,960 long tons (6,060 t), with 5,300 long tons (5,400 t) standard and 6,990 long tons (7,100 t) combat displacements. Her hull was constructed with longitudinal steel frames and incorporated seventeen watertight compartments and a double bottom that extended for 56 percent of the length of the keel. She had a waterline armored belt that was 50 mm (2 in) thick; her armored deck was 20 to 40 mm (0.79 to 1.57 in) thick, and her conning tower had 100 mm (3.9 in) thick sides.

The ship had a standard crew of nineteen officers and 464 enlisted men. While serving on cadet training cruises, her crew numbered twenty-nine officers and 445 enlisted, with 162 cadets. After 1940, her standard crew was increased to twenty-six officers and 556 enlisted, and after being reduced to a training ship, her crew numbered thirty officers and 653 enlisted men. Emden carried six boats. The German Navy regarded the ship as a good sea boat, with slight lee helm and gentle motion in a swell. The cruiser was manoeuvrable, but was slow going into a turn. Steering was controlled by a single large rudder. She lost speed only slightly in a head sea, but lost up to sixty percent in hard turns. She had a metacentric height of .79 m (2 ft 7 in).

=== Machinery ===
Emden was powered by two sets of Brown, Boveri & Co. geared steam turbines; they drove a pair of three-bladed screws that were 3.75 m (12.3 ft) in diameter. Steam was provided by four coal-fired Marine-type water-tube boilers and six oil-fired Marine water-tube boilers divided into four boiler rooms. The engines were rated at 46,500 shaft horsepower (34,700 kW) and a top speed of 29 knots (54 km/h; 33 mph). On speed trials, her engines reached 45,900 shp (34,200 kW) and a maximum of 29.4 knots (54.4 km/h; 33.8 mph). The ship was designed to carry 300 metric tons (295 long tons) of coal, though additional space could accommodate up to 875 metric tons (861 long tons). Oil capacity was 200 metric tons (197 long tons) as designed, and up to 1,170 metric tons (1,150 long tons) in additional fuel bunkers. This gave the ship a cruising radius of 6,700 nautical miles (12,400 km; 7,700 mi) at 12 knots (22 km/h; 14 mph). At 18 knots (33 km/h; 21 mph), her range fell to 5,200 nmi (9,600 km; 6,000 mi). Electrical power was supplied by two systems of three generators each, with a total combined output of 420 kilowatts (560 hp) at 220 Volts.

=== Armament ===
The ship's main battery was to have been eight 15 cm SK L/55 guns in twin turrets, but the Allied disarmament authority refused to permit this armament. Instead, she was equipped with existing stocks of 15 cm SK L/45 guns in single turrets. The guns were C/16 models; they fired a 45 kg (99 lb) shell at a muzzle velocity of 835 meters per second (2,740 ft/s). They could elevate to 40 degrees and had a maximum range of 17,600 m (57,700 ft). The eight guns were supplied with a total of 960 rounds of ammunition. Emden was also equipped with two 8.8 cm SK L/45 anti-aircraft guns, and a third was later added. These guns had between 900 and 1,200 rounds of ammunition in total. As designed, she was to have carried eight deck-mounted 50 cm (20 in) torpedo tubes in dual launchers, but only four tubes were fitted as built. In 1934, these were replaced with more powerful 53.3 cm (21 in) tubes. The ship carried twelve torpedoes.

In 1938, the ship's anti-aircraft battery was strengthened. She received two and later four 3.7 cm SK C/30 guns and up to eighteen 2 cm Flak guns. The capacity to carry 120 mines was also added. In 1942, two of the four torpedo launchers were removed, and she was rearmed with a new model of 15 cm gun. This gun was the Tbts KC/36 model, and was designed for use on destroyers. It fired a slightly smaller 40 kg (88 lb) shell at a higher muzzle velocity—875 m/s (2,870 ft/s). The gun could elevate to 47 degrees for a maximum range of 23,500 m (77,100 ft). By 1945, the ship's anti-aircraft battery consisted of nine 3.7 cm guns and six 2 cm guns.

== Service history ==
=== Construction – 1931 ===
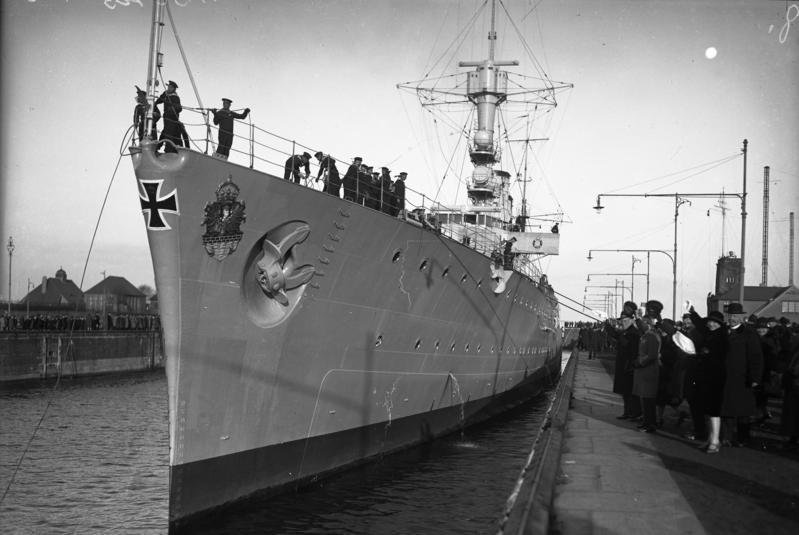
Emden in port, showing the Iron Cross worn to honor her namesake.

Emden was laid down at the Reichsmarinewerft shipyard in Wilhelmshaven on 8 December 1921. Political instability and Germany's financial weakness in the early 1920s delayed construction of the ship, and she was launched on 7 January 1925. Admiral Hans Zenker gave a speech at her launching, and the ship was christened by the widow of Karl von Müller, who had commanded the original Emden during World War I. The new cruiser was commissioned into the fleet nine months later, on 15 October 1925. Intended for use as a training ship for naval cadets, Emden was assigned to the Marinestation der Nordsee (North Sea Naval Station); she began sea trials after entering service, and these were interrupted with alterations in the Reichsmarinewerft that included a reconstruction of the battle mast. After these were completed in 1926, she conducted individual training and made numerous visits to foreign ports in northern European waters. In August and September 1926, she took part in annual fleet manoeuvres, and in October she returned to the shipyard again to have her aft funnel increased in height to match the forward one. Emden was at that time allocated to the Training Inspectorate of the Navy.

Emden embarked on her first long-range training cruise on 14 November 1926 from Wilhelmshaven. The ship traveled to south around Africa and across the Indian Ocean, where she stopped in the Cocos Islands, where the wreck of the original Emden was still present. The crew held a memorial service there on 15 March 1927 before continuing on to East Asian waters. She visited ports in Japan before crossing the northern Pacific Ocean to Alaska and then steamed down the western coast of North America, calling in various harbors along the way. Emden continued south through Central and South American waters, crossing into the Atlantic Ocean and turning north; the ship was in Rio de Janeiro, Brazil on 25 December. She returned to Germany by way of the Azores and Vilagarcía, Spain, arriving in Wilhelmhaven on 14 March 1928.

The ship spent much of the rest of the year preparing for the next major cruise, which began on 5 December. By this time, the ship had come under the command of Korvettenkapitän (Corvette Captain) Lothar von Arnauld de la Perière, who had come aboard in September. The ship steamed down to the Mediterranean Sea and stopped in Istanbul, Turkey, before traveling south through the Suez Canal, across the Indian Ocean to the Dutch East Indies, and then to Australia. Emden then crossed the Pacific to Hawaii before proceeding to the west coast of the United States. She then steamed south to the Panama Canal, which she transited to the Caribbean Sea. The ship then crossed to Las Palmas in the Canary Islands before returning to Wilhelmshaven, which she reached on 13 December 1929.

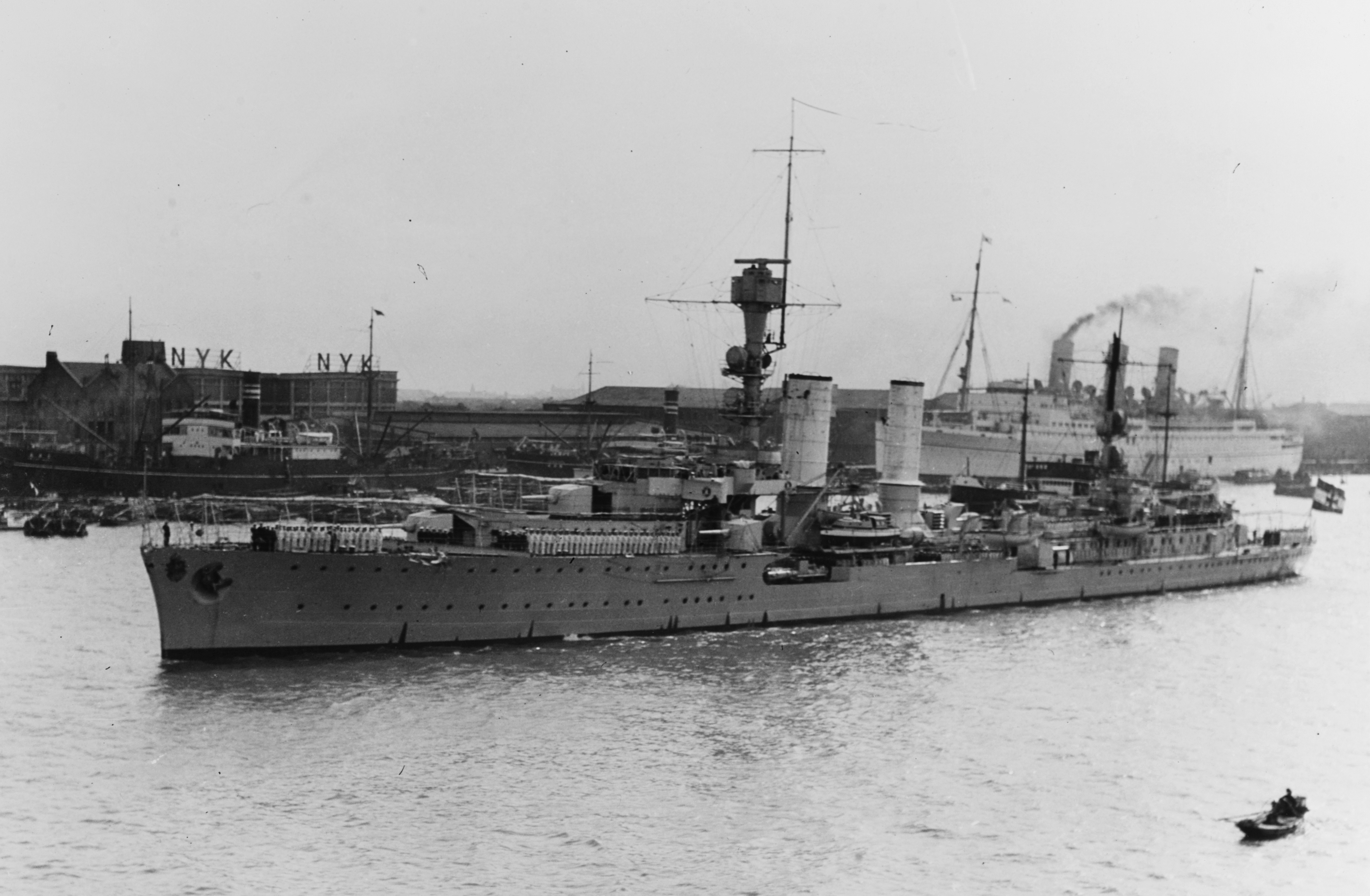
Emden departing Shanghai in 1931

On 13 January 1930, Emden left Wilhelmshaven on her third voyage abroad. She steamed into the Atlantic and stopped in Madeira before crossing over to tour several ports in the Caribbean, including Saint Thomas in the US Virgin Islands, New Orleans and Charleston in the US, Kingston, Jamaica, and San Juan, Puerto Rico. The ship recrossed the Atlantic, stopping in Las Palmas and Santa Cruz de Tenerife on the way, before arriving back in Wilhelmshaven on 13 May 1930. There, she went into the shipyard for an extensive overhaul. In October, Fregattenkapitän (FK—Frigate Captain) Robert Witthoeft-Emden took command of the ship.

Emden embarked on her next overseas cruise on 1 December. The ship initially cruised to Vigo, Spain before entering the Mediterranean. She stopped in Souda Bay, Crete and then transited the Suez Canal, stopping in Aden, Cochin, Colombo, Trincomalee, Port Blair as she crossed the Indian Ocean to Sabang in the Dutch East Indies. Emden then visited numerous ports in Southeast Asia, China, Japan, and the Pacific, including Bangkok, Victoria, Labuan, Manila, Nanking, Shanghai, Nagasaki, Osaka, Nii-jima, Tsuruga, Hakodate, Otaru, Yokohama, and Guam. Emden then crossed back through the Indian Ocean, stopping in Mauritius before arriving in South Africa; there, she stopped in Durban and East London, where a group of the ship's officers went to Johannesburg; there, they were received by J. B. M. Hertzog, the Prime Minister of South Africa. On the way back to Germany, the ship stopped in Lobito and Luanda in Portuguese Angola, Las Palmas, and Santander, Spain. She reached Wilhelmshaven on 8 December 1931.

=== 1932–1939 ===
On 1 January 1932, Emden, under the command of FK Werner Grassmann, was transferred from the Training Inspectorate to the Commander of Reconnaissance Forces, Konteradmiral (Rear Admiral) Conrad Albrecht. During this period, the ship took part in training exercises with the fleet's scouting forces, including the annual fleet maneuvers in August and September. She also participated in a fleet training cruise into the Atlantic, during which she visited Funchal and Las Palmas with the light cruiser Leipzig. Emden was decommissioned on 1 April 1933 for an extensive refit that involved the replacement of her four coal-fired boilers with oil-fired models. Both funnels were shorted by approximately 2 meters (6 ft 7 in) and gaffs for the wireless transmitters were installed on the aft funnel. On returning to service on 29 September 1934, FK Karl Dönitz, the future commander of the Kriegsmarine, took command of the ship. At this time, she returned to the Training Inspectorate and resumed long-range cruises. The first such voyage began on 10 November, and included stops in Santa Cruz de La Palma, Cape Town and East London, Porto Amelia in Portuguese Mozambique, Mombasa, Kenya, Victoria, Seychelles, Trincomalee, and Cochin. On the way back home, she entered the Mediterranean via the Suez Canal and visited Alexandria, Cartagena, Ponta Delgada, Lisbon, and Vigo, before anchoring in the Schillig roadstead outside Wilhelmshaven on 12 June 1935.

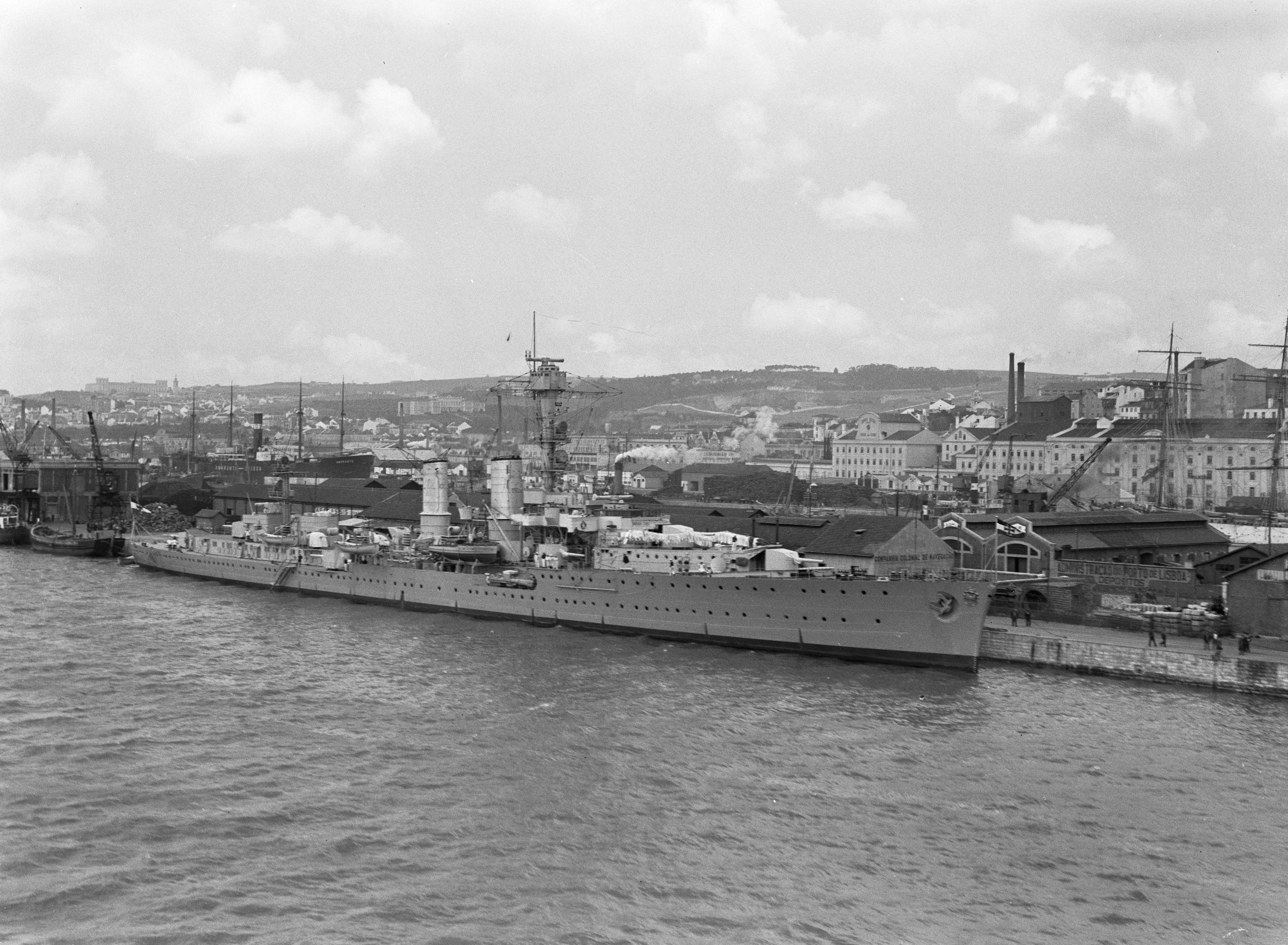
Emden in Lisbon in 1935

Emden started her sixth major training cruise on 23 October, under the command of Kapitän zur See (KzS—Captain at Sea) Johannes Bachmann, which went to the Americas. She crossed the Atlantic by way of the Azores, toured the West Indies and visited Venezuela, before passing through the Panama Canal to Guayaquil, Ecuador on 25 December. She then steamed north to Puerto San José, Guatemala before continuing on to Portland, Oregon and then crossing over to Hawaii. From there, she returned to Central America, crossed back through the Panama Canal, visited more islands in the West Indies, and then cruised the eastern coast of North America, stopping in Baltimore and Montreal. The ship then recrossed the Atlantic to Pontevedra, Spain and returned to Germany, arriving on 11 June 1936. In August, Bachmann was replaced by KzS Walter Lohmann. The next major training cruise began on 10 October; Emden steamed to the Mediterranean Sea and visited Cagliari on the island of Sardinia, and passed through the Dardanelles to Istanbul, and continued on through the Bosporus to the Black Sea. There, she stopped in Varna, Bulgaria, before returning to the Mediterranean and steaming through the Suez Canal. The ship stopped in British Ceylon on her way to East Asia, where she visited ports in Thailand, China, and Japan. On the way back to Germany, she stopped in Padang in the Dutch East Indies and Bombay, India. Another trip through the Suez Canal brought the ship back to the Mediterranean; she stopped in Algeciras, Spain on 15 April 1937, passed through the English Channel three days later, and reached Voslapp, Germany on the 19th. The ship finally returned to Wilhelmshaven on 23 April.

On 11 October 1937, Emden began her eighth major cruise, departing Wilhelmshaven for the Mediterranean under the command of FK Leopold Bürkner. There, she joined the German naval forces that had been sent to the non-intervention patrols enforcing the arms embargo on Spain during the Spanish Civil War. Emden remained here for only a few days, from 16 to 18 October, before continuing on through the Suez Canal to the Indian Ocean. There, she stopped in a variety of foreign ports, including Massawa in Italian Eritrea, Colombo in British Ceylon, Mormugao, India, and Belawan and Surabaya in the Dutch East Indies. On her return to the Mediterranean, she briefly rejoined the non-intervention patrols off the Spanish coast from 14 to 21 March 1938. She then continued on to Amsterdam and ultimately arrived back in Wilhelmshaven on 23 April.

In June, KzS Paul Wever relieved Bürkner in preparation for the next major cruise, which began on 26 July. Emden steamed north to Norway, then crossed the North Atlantic to Iceland, stopping in Reykjavík before turning south to the Azores and Bermuda. There, she stopped in Hamilton from 30 August to 3 September; the visit proved to be an unfriendly one, as international opinion had turned decidedly against Nazi Germany during the Sudeten crisis. Indeed, a planned visit to Havana, Cuba was cancelled and Emden was recalled to Germany. She stopped in Funchal from 10 to 15 September on the way back to Wilhelmshaven, though before she arrived the Munich Agreement that ended the crisis had been signed, and so international tensions decreased enough to allow Emden to continue the training cruise. The ship turned south and entered the Mediterranean and later the Black Sea. She was present in Istanbul from 19 to 23 October, when the funeral for Mustafa Kemal Atatürk, the first president of Turkey, was held. Emden returned to Germany by way of Rhodes and Vigo, arriving in Wilhelmshaven on 16 December. From 29 March to 15 April 1939, Emden was used as a fishery protection ship. During this period, she visited Reykjavík. In May, Wever left the ship and his place was taken by KzS Werner Lange.

=== World War II ===
After the outbreak of World War II in September 1939, Emden took part in laying a defensive minefield off the German coast in the North Sea on 3 September, along with several light cruisers and destroyers. The barrier stretched across the German Bight from the coast of the Netherlands to the Jutland peninsula; the purpose of the minefield was to secure the seaward flank of the Westwall. She conducted the operation with the other light cruisers Nürnberg, Leipzig, Köln, and Königsberg and sixteen destroyers. After laying her first set of mines, she returned to Wilhelmshaven to restock her mines. While Emden was moored in the harbor, a force of ten British Blenheim bombers from No. 107 and No. 110 RAF squadrons attacked the port on 4 September. Bootsmat Diezelsky on one of the cruiser's 2 cm guns shot down one of bombers, which inadvertently crashed into the ship. It is widely believed, that the aircraft hit Emden in the starboard, and it was N6199 from No. 110 Squadron flown by F/O Emden. However, according to more detailed analyses, the cruiser was attacked by aircraft from No. 107 squadron. Borisenko states that Emden was hit by the Blenheim N6189 flown by F/O Herbert Lightoller, while Tetera claims that N6188 flown by P/O W. Murphy struck the ship, while Lightoller's aircraft fell on the pier. Borisenko states that Lightoller's aircraft in fact hit the cruiser's port board, while the bombs it had released exploded in the water on her starboard side, causing additional superficial damage. There are different casualty numbers quoted, but the newest research by Tetera indicates eleven men from Emden killed, including two officers, and another thirty wounded; these were among the first casualties of the German fleet during the war.

Emden then transferred to the Baltic, where she was assigned to commerce protection duties. She returned to Wilhelmshaven for periodic maintenance from 2 December to 3 January 1940, after which she resumed training duties. During the shipyard period, a degaussing coil was installed just above the waterline to protect the ship from magnetic mines and her anti-aircraft armament was strengthened. After the work was completed, Emden returned to training duties through the winter of 1939–1940.

==== Operation Weserübung ====
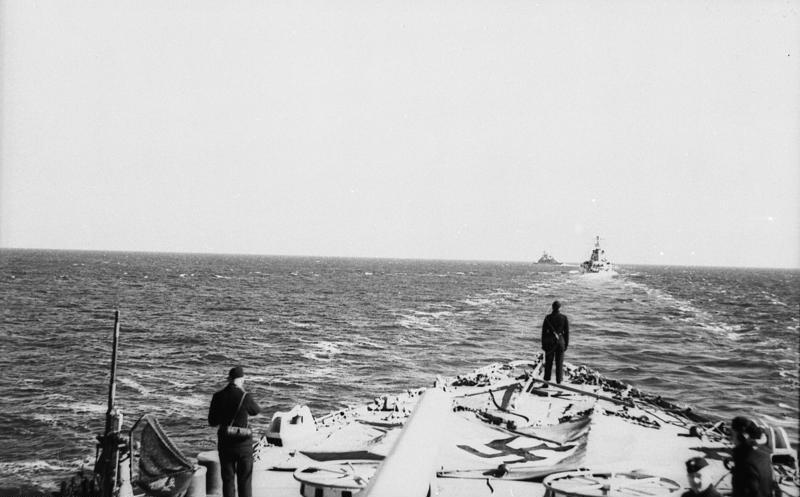
View from Emden's deck, following behind Blücher and Lützow on the way to Oslo, 8 April 1940

As Germany assembled forces for the invasion of Norway, codenamed Operation Weserübung, Emden was allocated to Group 5, which was tasked with seizing Oslo. She joined the group as it began forming in Swinemünde on 12 March. The group consisted of the heavy cruiser Blücher, the flagship, the heavy cruiser Lützow, three torpedo boats, and eight R-type minesweepers. On the night of 5 April, Emden and Blücher conducted searchlight training to prepare for night operations. The following day, Emden embarked 600 soldiers and their equipment in Swinemünde before proceeding to the collection point for the invasion fleet, Strander Bucht outside Kiel. At 03:00 on 8 April, Group 5 left Strander Bucht and steamed to the Oslofjord, where they arrived at midnight.

After reaching the approaches to the fjord, Emden transferred 350 of the men to the R-boats to allow them to go ashore. The element of surprise was lost, however, and on entering the narrows in the fjord, Blücher was engaged and sunk by Norwegian coastal defenses at Oscarsborg Fortress in the Battle of Drøbak Sound. Lützow was also damaged before the Germans broke off the attack. After the loss of Blücher, Emden and Lützow disembarked their troops further down the fjord so they could attack the coastal defenses from the rear. Once the ground troops had begun their attack, Emden and Lützow closed with the Oscarborg fortress at 15:55 and began providing covering fire. The Germans then negotiated surrender terms with the other Norwegian forces later on 9 April. Emden entered the port on the morning of 10 April, thereafter serving as a joint communications center to coordinate Kriegsmarine, Wehrmacht, and Luftwaffe operations. She was relieved of this duty on 24 April, though she remained in Oslo until 7 June. During this period, Großadmiral (Grand Admiral) Erich Raeder visited the ship on 17 May. Emden arrived back in Swinemünde on 8 June, where she resumed training duties.

==== Baltic operations ====
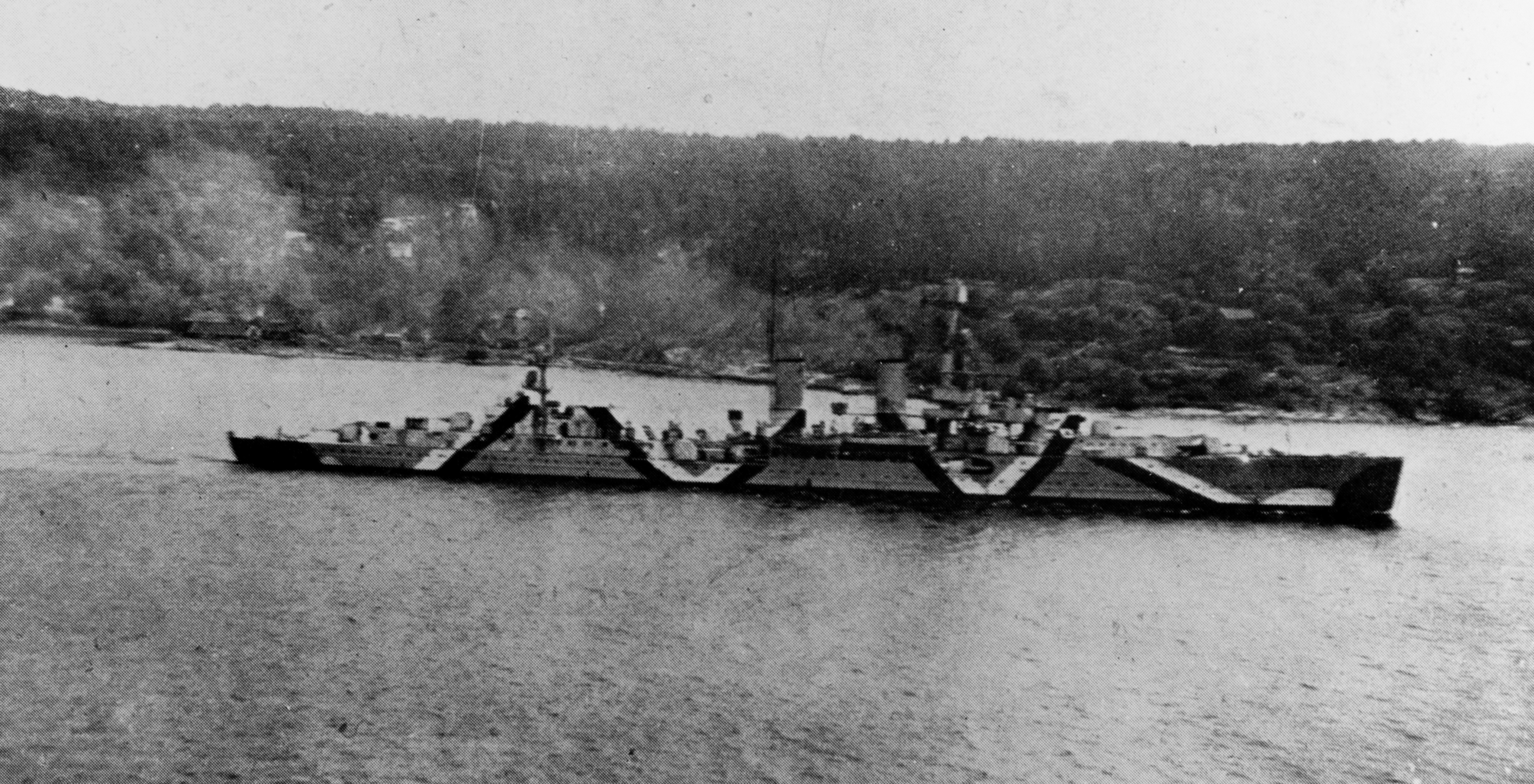
Emden underway in the Oslofjord in late summer 1941

From 7 November 1940 to 15 February 1941, the ship was in dry dock for maintenance. In September, she was assigned to the Baltic Fleet, centered on the newly commissioned battleship Tirpitz; the Baltic Fleet was tasked with preventing the Soviet Navy from breaking out of the Baltic. Emden and Leipzig were the core of the southern group, which was based in Libau. The fleet remained on station only briefly, and when it became clear that the Soviet fleet had remained in port, the German Baltic Fleet was dissolved. On 16 September, Emden was operating off Dagö with Leipzig and three torpedo boats; the ships came under fire from Soviet coastal batteries, but were undamaged. A group of four Soviet torpedo boats also made an unsuccessful attack on the German squadron. Emden again provided gunfire support to German troops fighting on the Sworbe Peninsula from 26 to 27 September. Later on the 27th, the ship was transferred to Gotenhafen. She was assigned to the newly formed Training Unit of the Fleet in November 1941, and she would remain attached to the unit for the rest of the war. From June to November 1942, the ship was thoroughly overhauled in Wilhelmshaven, before returning to Gotenhafen on 7 November. Raeder again came aboard the ship for the voyage back to Gotenhafen; this was his last visit to a warship before his resignation.

While on sea trials after the 1942 overhaul, Emden reached a speed of 26.9 knots (49.8 km/h; 31.0 mph), significantly less than her original top speed. By that time, the ship had been in service for sixteen years and retained her original engines. Due for an engine replacement, the war situation prevented the work from being done and Emden soldiered on. The year 1943 passed uneventfully for Emden, though she received a strengthened anti-aircraft battery that included 10.5 cm (4.1 in) and a pair of 4 cm (1.6 in) Bofors guns. The ship took part in a pair of minelaying operations in the Skagerrak in late 1944, the first from 19 to 21 September and the second from 5 to 6 October. The increasing frequency of Allied air attacks on the minelaying operations led to their cancellation in late October. For the rest of the year, she was occupied with escorting convoys in the Baltic. On 1 November 1944, Emden assisted the cruiser Köln, which had run aground. Emden herself ran aground in the Oslofjord on 9 December, though she was refloated the following day. She left Oslo on 23 December and steamed to Königsberg for repairs, arriving two days later.

After entering the dry dock at the Schichau-Werke shipyard in Königsberg, her guns were removed and repair work began at a leisurely rate. She was there, still awaiting the completion of repairs when the Soviet Army attacked the city of Königsberg in January 1945, and on 23 January the naval high command ordered all naval forces in the city to evacuate. Emden had her guns reinstalled and she embarked the remains of Paul von Hindenburg and his wife, which had been disinterred to prevent them from falling into the hands of the advancing Soviet Army. She carried them to Pillau, under tow from several icebreakers, where they were transferred to the transport ship MS Pretoria. In Pillau, Emden's engines were put back in working order, though she was only able to use one of her propellers. Emden then steamed as fast as was possible to Kiel, where she arrived on 6 February. There, she went into drydock at the Deutsche Werke shipyard for repairs.

While in Deutsche Werke, Emden was under continuous air attacks. An air raid on 11 March set the forward deck and port side torpedo launchers on fire with incendiary bombs. Another attack on 3 April scored a direct hit on the ship's forward funnel, destroying it. On the night of 9–10 April, an Allied bombing raid severely damaged the ships in Kiel; the heavy cruisers Admiral Hipper and Admiral Scheer were both destroyed by bombs and Emden was slightly damaged by a near miss astern. Further, more serious damage was done on 13 April, and the next morning she was towed out into Heikendorfer Bucht. She had a 15 degree list to port, but the crew managed to stop the flooding and seal the hull. To prevent her from sinking, she was run aground in the shallows, and was decommissioned on 26 April 1945. To prevent her capture by the advancing Allied armies, her crew destroyed the ship with explosives on 3 May, five days before the end of World War II in Europe. The wreck was broken up for scrap in situ over the following five years. Her bow ornament is currently on display in the Deutsches Museum in Munich.
