= When We Were Twenty-One =

1915 film

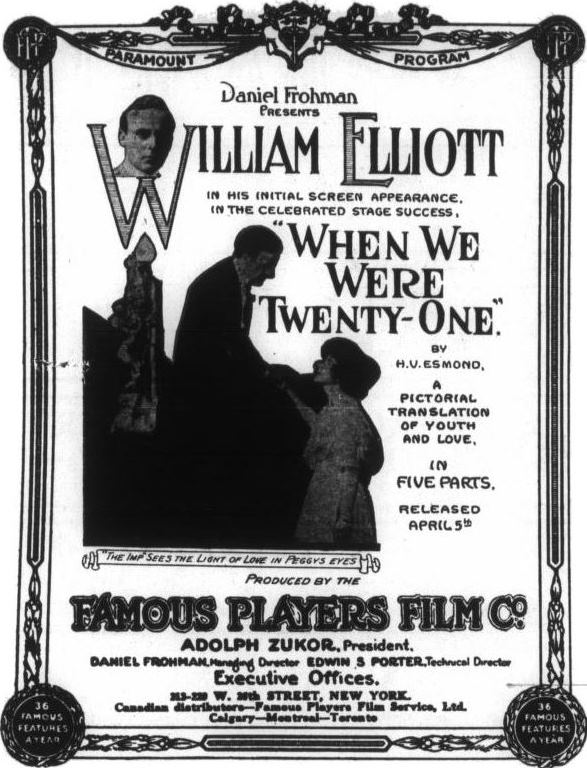
- Advertisement
- Directed by: Hugh Ford; Edwin S. Porter
- Screenplay by: H.V. Esmond
- Produced by: Daniel Frohman
- Starring: William Elliott; Charles Waldron; Marie Empress; Helen Lutrell; Winifred Allen; Arthur Hoops
- Production company: Famous Players Film Company
- Distributed by: Paramount Pictures
- Release date: April 5, 1915
- Running time: 5 reels
- Country: United States
- Language: Silent (English intertitles)

When We Were Twenty-One is a 1915 American silent comedy film directed by Hugh Ford and Edwin S. Porter and written by H.V. Esmond. The film stars William Elliott, Charles Waldron, Marie Empress, Helen Lutrell, Winifred Allen, and Arthur Hoops. The film was released on April 5, 1915, by Paramount Pictures.

== Plot ==
Barrister Dick Carew receives a letter from a dying friend asking that he and his three bachelor friends, known as the Trinity, adopt his baby, Richard Audaine. Although they experience awkwardness in caring for the infant, they soon grow to love him. In a mock ceremony, the four guardians betroth Richard to Phyllis, the baby daughter of the housekeeper, Mrs. Ericson. Nicknamed "The Imp" because of his fondness for pranks, Richard grows to be athletic and handsome. In college, Richard lives a riotous life, while becoming a football hero. Richard soon becomes infatuated with a dancer known as "The Firefly," who, after hearing a rumor that he will inherit a fortune when he turns twenty-one, entices him to marry her. Richard's four guardians, ready to sacrifice their own reputations, help extricate Richard from the marriage after "The Firefly," upon learning that Richard has no fortune, leaves him for another man. Regenerated through suffering, Richard, at the end, finds a lasting love.

== Cast ==
- William Elliott as Richard Audaine
- Charles Waldron as Dick Carew
- Marie Empress as The Firefly
- Helen Lutrell as Phyllis
- Winifred Allen as Peggy
- Arthur Hoops as The Trinity
- Charles Coleman as The Trinity
- George Backus as The Trinity
- Mrs. Gordon as Mrs. Ericson

== See also ==
- Edwin S. Porter filmography
