= Her Debt of Honor =

1916 film

- Directed by: William Nigh
- Written by: William Nigh
- Starring: Valli Valli; William B. Davidson; John Goldsworthy
- Production company: Columbia Pictures
- Distributed by: Metro Pictures
- Release date: January 24, 1916
- Running time: 50 minutes
- Country: United States
- Languages: Silent; English intertitles

Her Debt of Honor is a 1916 American silent drama film directed by William Nigh and starring Valli Valli, William B. Davidson and John Goldsworthy.

== Cast ==
- Valli Valli as Marian Delmar
- William B. Davidson as John Hartfield
- William Nigh as Olin Varcoe
- John Goldsworthy as Crawford Granger
- Frank Bacon as Dr. Glade
- Mathilde Brundage as Mrs. Varcoe
- Ilean Hume as Niatana
- Frank Montgomery as Kalatin
- David Thompson as Pierre Leroux
- R.A. Bresee as Old Wolf
- Jack Murray as Swiftwind

== Bibliography ==
- Parish, James Robert & Pitts, Michael R. Film directors: a guide to their American films. Scarecrow Press, 1974.
