= Marie Empress =

British actress

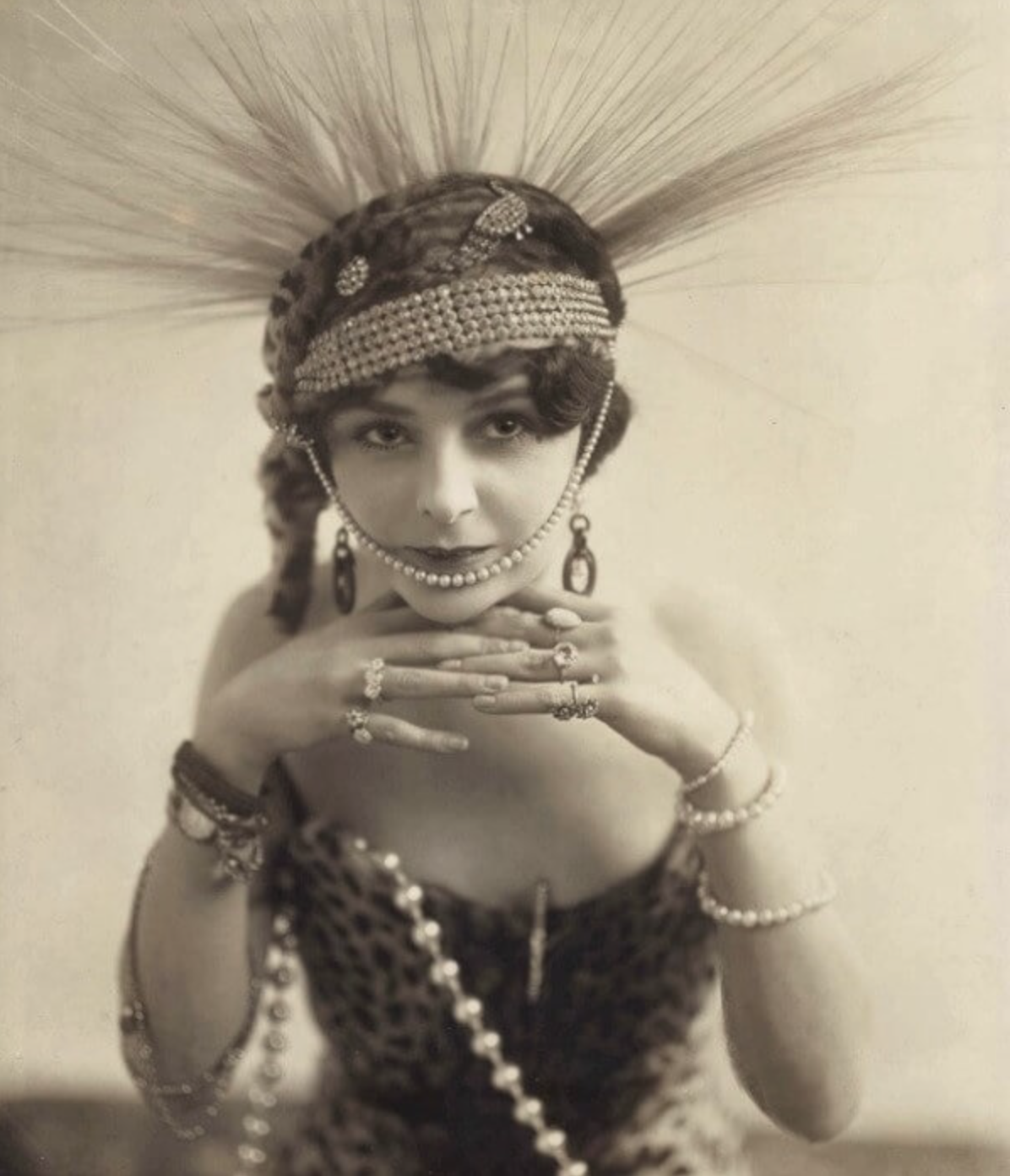
- Marie Empress, from a 1916 publication
- Born: Mary Ann Louisa Taylor; 26 March 1884; Birmingham, England
- Disappeared: 26 October 1919 (aged 35)
- Status: Unknown, Presumed dead at sea
- Occupation: Actress
- Notable work: When We Were Twenty-One

Marie Empress (26 March 1884 – October 1919), born Mary Ann Louisa Taylor, was a British actress on stage and in silent films. She acted in England and America and she disappeared from an ocean liner the day before it docked in New York. The cause was never determined and she was declared dead in 1921.

== Early life ==
Mary Ann Louisa Taylor was born in Birmingham. Her father was a contractor. She sometimes claimed to be a great-grand niece of actor Edmund Kean.

== Career ==
Empress began her stage career in England, performing as a male impersonator and in variety shows. She appeared on Broadway in The Little Cafe (1913), and began to work in motion pictures. She starred in several silent films, including Old Dutch (1915), The Stubbornness of Geraldine (1915), The Woman Pays (1915), Behind Closed Doors (1916), Sibyl's Scenario (1916), When We Were Twenty-One (1915), Love's Cross Roads (1916), The Chorus Girl and the Kid (1916), A Lesson from Life (1916), The Woman Redeemed (1916), The Girl Who Doesn't Know (1916), and The Guilty Woman (1919).

== Personal life and disappearance ==
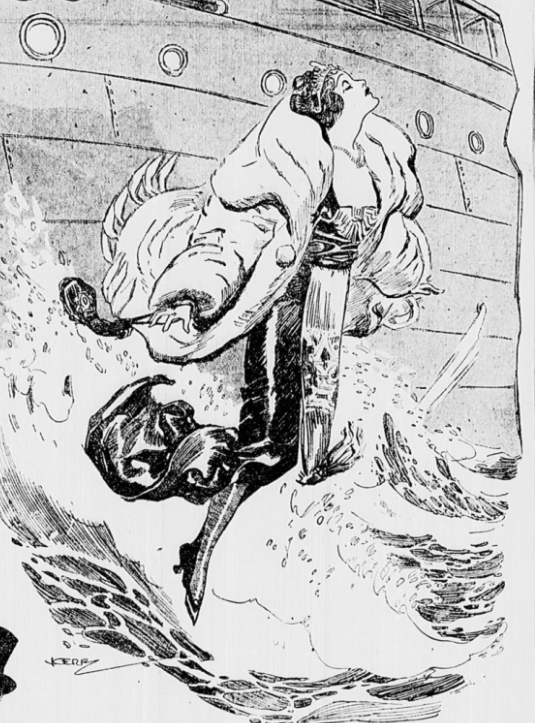
Newspaper illustration of the mystery of Marie Empress's disappearance

Empress married a dentist, William Horton, in 1902; they separated in 1906, and legally divorced in 1918. She had a tumultuous personal life, including "grand passions", suspected drug use, and unexplained scars. Her film roles tended to lurid vamp characters, and headlines did not always distinguish between the actress and her character.

Empress was last seen in her state room on the Cunard ocean liner SS Orduña in October 1919, the day before it docked in New York City. Fellow passengers had noticed that she always had a veil and was dressed in black. She presumably went overboard and drowned, aged 35 years; precisely when she died was never determined. Newspapers understood that she had been given a glass of water on the Sunday evening but she was not in her cabin the following morning and her bed was unused. Rumours persisted that she was not actually dead but perhaps disembarked in disguise as part of a publicity stunt. Empress's will was proven and was announced in November 1921. Her death was assumed to be on 25 October 1919 or some time after.

== See also ==
- List of people who disappeared mysteriously at sea
