= Edward Brennan =

Edward Brennan may refer to:

- Eddie Brennan (born 1978), Irish hurler and manager
- Edward A. Brennan (1934–2007), American businessman
- Ned Brennan (1920–1988), Irish politician
- Edward Brennan (philanthropist) (1784–1859), British philanthropist lived and died in India
