= Resignation and post-war life of Erich Raeder =

Later life of German admiral

Erich Johann Albert Raeder (24 April 1876 – 6 November 1960) was a naval leader in Germany before and during World War II. Raeder attained the highest possible naval rank – that of Großadmiral (Grand Admiral) – in 1939, becoming the first person to hold that rank since Henning von Holtzendorff. Raeder led the Kriegsmarine (German War Navy) for the first half of the war; he resigned in 1943 and was replaced by Karl Dönitz. He was sentenced to life in prison at the Nuremberg Trials, but was released early due to failing health.

== Background ==
A series of failed operations after that point, particularly the Battle of the Barents Sea—combined with the outstanding success of the U-boat fleet under the command of Karl Dönitz—led to his eventual demotion to the rank of Admiral Inspector of the Kriegsmarine in January 1943. The office of Admiral Inspector was only a ceremonial position with no power. After the Battle of the Barents Sea on 31 December 1942, Raeder, who had received confusing, misleading and incomplete reports from Admiral Oskar Kummetz, had at first reported to Hitler a great victory had been won above the Arctic Circle. Kummetz mentioned in his report that the sky was red – a reference to the Aurora Borealis – and Raeder misunderstood this as meaning that the sky was red because the British ships were all on fire. Later on the evening of 31 December 1942, Raeder called Admiral Theodor Krancke at the Wolf's Lair to explain the misunderstanding but there was a New Year's party going on and Krancke decided not to ruin the party by reporting the misunderstanding. Hitler during his New Year's Address delivered on the radio later that night mentioned the victory that the Kriegsmarine had won on the last day of 1942 with an entire British convoy said to have been destroyed.

Only in the late afternoon on 1 January 1943 did Hitler learn that the Kriegsmarine had in fact been defeated in the Barents Sea, which put Hitler into a huge rage against the navy in general and Raeder in particular. As a result, Raeder was ordered to leave Berlin for the Wolf's Lair to explain to Hitler personally just why he reported the defeat in the Barents Sea as a victory – a trip that Raeder was not keen to make as he waited until 6 January 1943 before reporting at the Wolf's Lair. At a meeting on 6 January 1943 Hitler for over 2 hours savaged Raeder, complaining that he had spent millions of Reichsmarks in the 1930s building a fleet that proved useless when war came, instead of spending the money on building U-boats, which had proven far more useful in the war. Hitler went on to castigate the navy, saying that navy had done nothing in the wars of unification, that the High Seas Fleet "played no important role in the World War" and lacked "... men of action who were determined to fight with or without the Kaiser", that the navy were a nest of traitors whose only contribution to World War I was the High Seas Fleet mutiny of 1918, and that given this history, it was no surprise that the navy's record in World War II with the notable exception of the U-boats was one of failure after failure. Raeder, who had always taken great pride in the history of the navy, was very hurt by Hitler's account of German naval history, which was almost certainly Hitler's intention. Hitler offered up the recent Battle of the Barents Sea as just one more example of how the navy except for the U-boats failed him time after time. Hitler went on to accuse naval officers of being cowards not fully committed to victory, and offered a contrast with the Army, which Hitler claimed was run by brave men unafraid of death in their quest for total victory. Finally, Hitler announced that since Germany's capital ships had proven so useless, he was planning to scrap all of the capital ships and use their guns for coastal defence. The gun crews would be assigned to coastal defence, while the rest of their crews would be redeployed to the U-boats and the E-boats or re-trained and sent to the Eastern Front as infantry. Raeder left the meeting of 6 January very depressed, especially over the prospect of seeing his beloved capital ships scrapped and of Hitler's criticism of his leadership. Raeder told Hitler on 14 January 1943 that he could not preside over the scrapping of the capital ships, and informed the Führer of his wish to resign as of 30 January 1943 rather than carry out a policy that he did not believe in.

== Resignation ==
Raeder offered his resignation rather than accept the scrapping of the capital ships and formally resigned from the Kriegsmarine in May 1943. Dönitz succeeded him in the post of Commander-in-Chief of the Navy on 30 January 1943. By this point, Raeder completely detested Dönitz, and as such Raeder advised Hitler against appointing Dönitz as his successor, claiming that Dönitz was not qualified to run the navy and advised that his deputy Admiral Rolf Carls be his successor. Dönitz talked Hitler out of the plan to scrap the capital ships after taking over as Commander-in-Chief of the Navy, arguing successfully to Hitler that a fleet-in-being in Norway tied down British warships which could be used in the Battle of the Atlantic or against Japan.

Raeder's last speech as Commander-in-Chief occurred on 30 January 1943 before the Reichstag, where he asserted that he had brought the Navy "smoothly and completely" into the service of the Führer in 1933. Raeder argued that:

"This was possible only because, despite all outside efforts to influence it, the training of the Navy [under the Weimar Republic] derived from an inner attitude that was itself truly National Socialist. For this reason, we did not have to change, but could become followers of the Führer with open hearts. I find it particularly satisfying that the Führer has always attributed this to me, and I would like to ask all of you to see to it that the Navy remains a strong and reliable support of the Führer in this regard".

Though Hitler had cordial relations with Raeder, the two had never been close, and there was nothing like the mutual admiration that Hitler and Dönitz shared.

== 20 July Plot ==
After the failure to kill Hitler in July 1944, Raeder's first reaction was to go immediately to Rastenburg to personally assure Hitler of his loyalty. Raeder took a great deal of pleasure in criticising Hitler's SS security because he had taken a loaded handgun with him during his lunch with Hitler, but was not searched; after the lunch, Raeder produced the handgun, and then subjected Hitler's SS bodyguards to a loud and lengthy lecture about their incompetence and stupidity. Hitler was pleased to see Raeder. After Raeder had left, Hitler called him a man of "great stature" and "unwavering loyalty" who had so mercilessly stamped out "treason" in the navy that "not a single one of these criminals [the men involved in July 20 putsch] belongs to the Navy. Today it has no Reichpietsch in it" (Max Reichpietsch was one of the co-leaders of the 1917 High Seas Fleet mutiny).

== Defeat and capture ==
Raeder claimed in his 1957 memoirs Mein Leben that he had first learned that the regime in which he served so long was a criminal regime in March 1945 when he visited his old colleague, the former Defence Minister Otto Gessler in a hospital when he was recovering from the torture he received in a concentration camp. Shocked at Gessler's appearance, Raeder decided to protest against the Nazi regime by not wearing the Nazi Golden Party Badge that he had worn until then. The British historian Sir John Wheeler-Bennett mocked Raeder for taking until March 1945 to discover that the Nazi regime was a criminal regime, and called his protest via not wearing his Golden Party Badge pathetic.

When Raeder learned that Hitler planned to stay in Berlin rather than flee the Red Army, Raeder sent Hitler a message saying that he too would stay in Berlin to inspire Germans to resist to the bitter end. Hitler never acknowledged the message but Raeder remained in Berlin and survived the ensuing Battle of Berlin. In May 1945, Raeder was arrested by the Soviet forces and taken to Moscow. Raeder was treated more as a guest than as a prisoner during his time in Moscow, receiving good food, lodgings and medical treatment. Raeder offered his services to the Soviet government as a naval adviser, believing that his "lessons learned" from World War II would be invaluable to the Soviet Union in the post-war world, and wrote several historical tracts for the Soviet benefit about the naval aspects of World War II. Raeder was later to be deeply embarrassed when his writings in Moscow praising German-Soviet friendship and his offer to teach the Red Navy how to fight the British and Americans were made public by the Soviet government, which led several former Kriegsmarine officers led by his arch-rival Dönitz to accuse him of "collaboration" with the Russians. Raeder was very unpleasantly surprised in October 1945 when he learned that he had been indicted as a war criminal instead of staying in Moscow as more or less a guest of the Soviet regime. The Soviet delegation at the International Military Tribunal voted against indicting Raeder, but at the insistence of the American and French delegations, Raeder was indicted.

== After the war ==
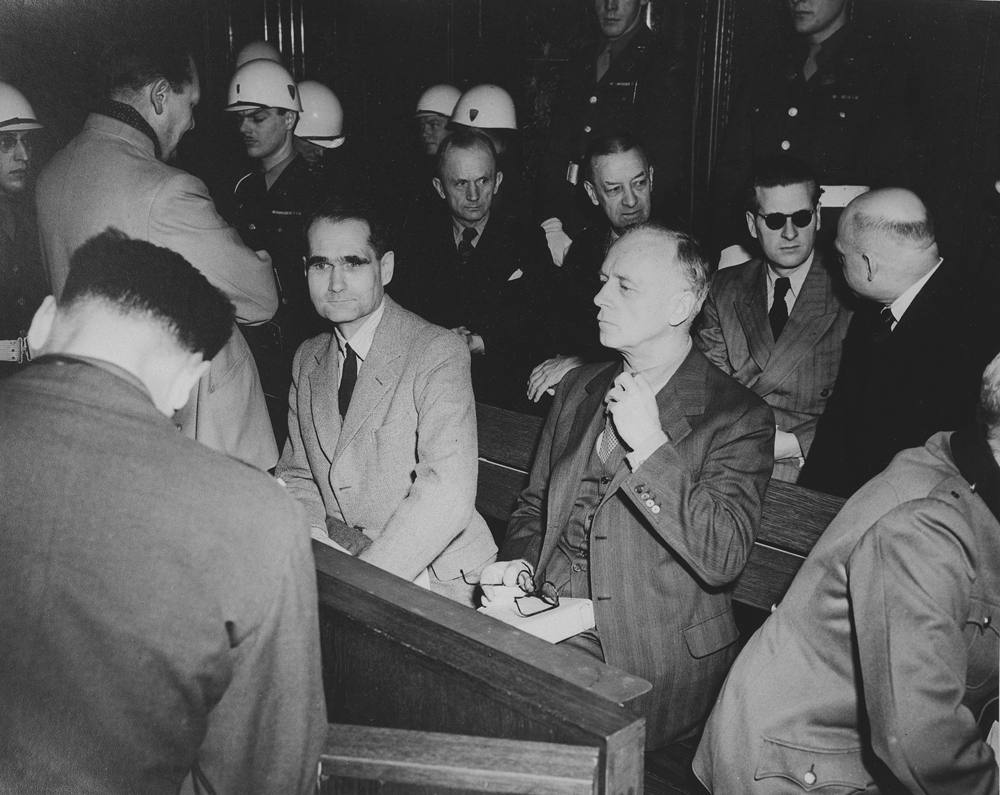
Raeder at Nuremberg trial (back row)

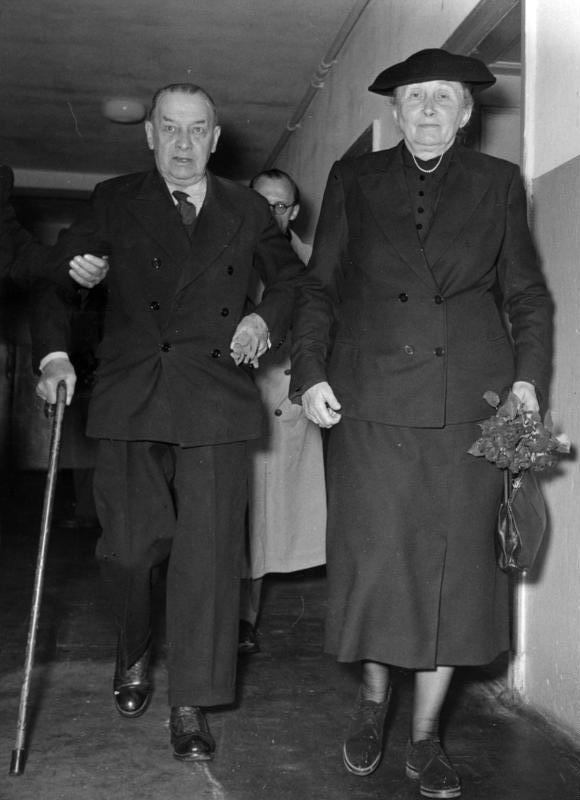
Raeder with his wife Erika at his 1955 release from Spandau. Erika Raeder led a successful campaign in the 1950s to free her husband.

=== Nuremberg trial ===
After the war, Raeder was sentenced to life imprisonment at the Nuremberg Trials, for waging a war of aggression, a charge arising from his planning of the German invasion of Norway and Denmark, for conspiracy against the peace for his role in preparing Germany for war before 1939, and for war crimes by enforcing the Commando Order.

Raeder's lawyer called three witnesses. The first was Carl Severing, the former SDP Prussian Interior Minister who testified that every government in the Weimar Republic had violated the disarmament clauses of the Treaty of Versailles, and the politicians of Weimar were well aware that officers like Raeder were violating Versailles. The second was the diplomat Baron Ernst von Weizsäcker, who testified that Raeder had not been involved in the propaganda effort to blame the sinking of the Athenia on the British. The third was Raeder's aide Vice Admiral Erich Schulte-Mönting who supported Raeder's claim to have been an apolitical officer just doing his job, and that Raeder had not been a Nazi. The German defence in the Nuremberg trials in 1946 argued that Germany was "compelled to attack Norway by the need to forestall an Allied invasion and that her action was therefore preemptive", like the Anglo-Soviet invasion of Iran. The German defence was referring to Plan R 4 and its predecessors. The International Military Tribunal at Nuremberg determined that no Allied invasion had been imminent, and therefore rejected the German argument that Germany was entitled to attack Norway. In response to Raeder's defence of pre-emptive war against Norway, the British prosecutor David Maxwell Fyfe read out the minutes of a meeting between Raeder and Hitler on 26 March 1940, which read:

"British landing in Norway is not considered imminent-Raeder suggests action by us at the next new moon-to which Hitler agrees."

When confronted with the minutes of the 26 March 1940 meeting by Maxwell Fyfe, Raeder had no response. Weinberg wrote that "especially eloquent lies" about the invasion of Norway were told by Raeder and his supporters. When Maxwell Fyfe charged that Raeder was guilty of violating both the Treaty of Versailles and the Anglo-German Naval Agreement and commented: "For 20 years, from 1918 to 1938, you and the German navy had been involved in a course of complete, cold and deliberate deception of your treaty obligations ... Do you deny this was so?" Raeder's response was that this was true, but "It was not a cold blooded affair". Raeder claimed that he was not involved in a conspiracy to commit aggression because Hitler's statements in the Hossbach Memorandum of 1937 and again to senior officers including Raeder for plans for a war with Poland in May and August 1939 together with Raeder's own statements to Hitler about seizing Norway in October–November 1939 were all just mere talk that was not to be taken seriously. The American historian Norman Goda wrote that Maxwell Fyfe and the American prosecutor Telford Taylor tore Raeder to pieces on the stand for his statements. Raeder testified that he was an apolitical professional who was just doing his duty, and to the extent he thought about politics, he disliked the Nazi regime. Raeder testified that he was deeply horrified by the nature of the Nazi regime when he saw how badly Gessler had been tortured in March 1945, stated he had stopped wearing his Golden Party Badge to protest the Nazi regime after he had seen what had been done to Gessler, and he had frequently made "serious protests" against the Nazi regime during private meetings with Hitler, so it was unfair to blame him for the crimes of the Third Reich. This in turn led him to be questioned by Maxwell Fyfe about his speech on Heroes' Day on 12 March 1939 praising Hitler "... for the clear and unmerciful declaration of war against Bolshevism and International Jewry, whose drive for destruction of peoples we have felt quite enough in our racial body". Raeder testified in response to Maxwell Fyfe's question about his Heroes' Day speech to his belief that starting in 1917 "International Jewry had destroyed the resistance of the German people ... and had gained an excessively large and oppressive influence in German affairs" and all of the anti-Semitic measures of the Nazi regime which presumably included genocide were merely just acts of German self-defence. Goda wrote that Raeder by his own testimony disproved his own claims to have been an apolitical professional who was against the Nazi regime, and instead established that he was an anti-Semite who willingly served the Nazi regime because of his hatred for Jews. Taylor commented about Raeder's claim to have been just an apolitical professional doing his job was meaningless because:

"It is an innocent and respectable business to be a locksmith, but it is nonetheless a crime if the locksmith turns his talents into picking the locks of his neighbours and looting their homes."

Raeder's claims to have been an apolitical officer who objected to the Nazis involved him in many testy exchanges with Maxwell Fyfe. Maxwell Fyfe charged that Raeder had been part of the effort to cover up that it was an U-boat that sank the Athenia and to falsely accuse the British of sinking the Athenia. Raeder claimed that he had been "very indignant" about his government's claim that Britain had sunk the Athenia, which led Maxwell Fyfe to remark that he had done nothing to express that "indignation", just as he claimed to have been angry about the false charges of homosexuality against Werner von Fritsch, where he had also done nothing after Fritsch had been cleared. One of the more serious charges facing Raeder was that he ordered unrestricted submarine warfare in 1939. Maxwell Fyfe brought up Raeder's order of 15 October 1939, which read:

"Measures which are considered necessary from a military point of view will have to be carried out, even if they are not covered by existing international law ... Every protest from neutral powers will have to be turned down ... The more ruthlessly economic warfare is waged ... the sooner the war will come to an end".

When questioned about his order on 15 October 1939 for unrestricted submarine warfare including orders to fire on neutral ships, which Raeder had admitted even as he issued his order violated international law, Raeder stated in his defence: "Neutrals are acting for their own egotistical reasons and they must pay the bills if they die".

Under cross-examination, Raeder admitted to passing on the Commando Order on 18 October 1942 to the Kriegsmarine and for enforcing the Commando Order by ordering the summary execution of captured British Royal Marines at Bordeaux in December 1942. Raeder testified in his defence that he believed that the Commando Order was a "justified" order, and that the execution of the Royal Marines was no war crime in his own opinion. Raeder charged that British Commandos had committed atrocities against German forces during the Dieppe raid, and the Commando Order was only a reasonable German response to what he called the British "deviation" from the laws of war. When asked about his entry in the war diary that seemed to criticise the shootings at Bordeaux, Raeder stated that he was not protesting against the executions per se, but was instead protesting that the shootings had been done by the Kriegsmarine, arguing that the local naval commanders should have handed over the British POWs to the SD to be shot. When questioned by Maxwell Fyfe about the Libau massacres, Raeder claimed that he no idea about what had happened, and maintained that he would have stopped the massacres had he known.

The Nuremberg trial was also a further escalation of Raeder's ongoing feud with Dönitz when an affidavit of Raeder's was introduced as evidence against Dönitz. Raeder described his relations with Dönitz as very poor, saying that Dönitz's "somewhat conceited and not always tactful nature did not appeal to me". Raeder claimed that Dönitz had made all sorts of blunders and mistakes "resulting from his personal viewpoint, which were known to the officer corps, soon became apparent, to the detriment of the Navy". Raeder accused Dönitz and Speer of failing the navy by mismanaging U-boat production, and said that Dönitz's National Socialism had blinded him to reality, writing: "His [Dönitz's] speech to the Hitler Youth, which was ridiculed in all circles, earned him the title of "Hitler-boy" Dönitz". Finally, Raeder claimed that Dönitz was unqualified to become Commander-in-Chief of the Navy in 1943, and that Dönitz was only appointed to that position because Hitler preferred an unqualified "Hitler-boy" like Dönitz to qualified officers like himself. On the night after the affidavit was introduced, the American psychologist Gustave Gilbert who interviewed Dönitz described him as being in state of rage against Raeder, accusing Raeder of being a bitter old man driven by jealousy that Dönitz was the superior officer.

=== Spandau years ===
On 1 October 1946, Raeder was found guilty of conspiracy against the peace, conspiracy to commit aggression, and war crimes. Raeder expected a death sentence, and was deeply shocked when he received life imprisonment, which he regarded as a worse punishment than execution, complaining that as an old man spending the rest of his life in prison would be unbearable. Raeder formally asked the International Military Tribunal to be executed by firing squad instead, only to be informed that the Tribunal did not have the powers to change its sentence. At Spandau Prison, Raeder spent his days working in the prison library. When not working in the library, Raeder spent his time debating with the prison chaplain, the French Pastor Georges Casalis who believed that Raeder's soul might be saved if he confessed his guilt, and tried hard to save Raeder. Raeder for his part did not believe he was guilty of anything, and he rejected Casalis's attempts to save his soul. When not debating questions of guilt with Casalis, Raeder spent his free time continuing his war-time feud with Karl Dönitz. Dönitz was savage in his relentless attacks against Raeder for his "policy of bloated surface vessels" and for not spending enough money on building U-boats in the 1930s, a policy that Dönitz claimed had cost him victory in the Battle of the Atlantic. Dönitz told the former Foreign Minister Konstantin von Neurath that "It had been Raeder's fault that until the middle of 1940 only two U-boats slid down the ways" per month, and that if only he had been Navy Commander-in-Chief in 1940 then he would have won the war. In 1951, Dönitz learned that a British historian had written if only Germany had a larger U-boat fleet in 1939, then Dönitz might have won the Atlantic campaign, leading Dönitz to announce that once he was free, he would repeat that judgement "in the full light of publicity" to ruin Raeder's reputation once and for all. When not blaming each other for losing the Battle of the Atlantic, the two admirals fought over status. The authoritarian Raeder still continued to behave as if he was Commander-in-Chief of the Navy, and expected Dönitz to behave like a subordinate who only existed to take orders, a position that Dönitz utterly rejected. Dönitz was also a Grand Admiral, making him Raeder's equal, and he fiercely resented Raeder's patronising, condescending attitude. Because Hitler had appointed Dönitz his successor in his last will and testament, well into the 1950s the Nationalist Socialist fanatic Dönitz continued to insist that he was still President of Germany, and that the NSDAP should still be the only legal party in Germany. Since in his own mind, he was still Germany's leader, Dönitz saw himself as Raeder's superior, and expected Raeder to be his subordinate.

From the moment Raeder was convicted, a campaign to have him released was started by his wife, Erika who routinely made very exaggerated claims to the press about how harsh life was in Spandau prison for her husband. In a 1950 interview, Erika Raeder claimed that her septuagenarian husband was forced to do brutal "hard labour" in Spandau when Raeder's job in Spandau was to work in the prison library. In another interview in 1951, Erika Raeder claimed that:

"The treatment we Germans had to endure is worse than anything that happened to the Jews".

Erika Raeder was on the whole portrayed favourably in the West German press, where she was depicted as a victim of Allied injustice while as a reporter put it "where does Raeder's guilt lie?" Erika Raeder's campaign to free her husband was joined by German veterans, who bombarded the American, British and French governments with demands that Raeder, who they claimed was an innocent man wrongly convicted at Nuremberg, be freed. Admiral Gottfried Hanson, head of the Verband deutscher Soldaten veterans' group in a letter in support of Raeder sent to the three western high commissioners' for Germany declared:

"As a friend of many years' standing, and certain that all ex-members of the Navy will agree with me, I venture to say that no military leader could have educated and influenced his subordinates from a higher moral and Christian level than did Raeder ... both as a man and a Christian ... How can genuine peace and real understanding among the nations of the occident be brought about ... if true right and justice is not applied to the Germans that are still be kept prisoners?"

In an interview in November 1950, Admiral Hanson claimed that American and other United Nations commanders fighting in the Korean War would have been convicted of aggression if the same standards that were applied to Raeder applied to them. The French High Commissioner in Germany André François-Poncet replied that the admiral seemed ill-informed about history and the law, stating that North Korea had attacked South Korea, and that UN forces in Korea were fighting in response to South Korean appeals for help and under the authority of the UN Security Council, which did not correspond at all to the situation with Norway in 1940. In Britain, the campaign to free Raeder was headed by the historian Captain Basil Liddell Hart and Lord Hankey, both of whom repeatedly charged that the attack on Norway was a "preventive war" forced on Germany, and as such, not only was Raeder innocent, but that Winston Churchill should have been convicted of conspiracy to commit aggression against Norway in place of Raeder. Hankey used his seat in the House of Lords to express his support for Raeder while Liddell Hart in a series of widely publicised interviews claimed that Raeder was an innocent man. A good part of Hankey's 1950 book Politics, Trials, and Errors, in which Hankey argued for the innocence of all the German and Japanese war criminals convicted by Allied courts and strenuously attacked the legitimacy of war crimes trials was taken up with a defence of Raeder. Hankey claimed that even in 1940 it was clear that invasion of Norway had been a defensive move forced on Raeder by Britain. More recently, the American journalist Patrick Buchanan in his 2008 book Churchill, Hitler and the Unnecessary War defended Raeder, arguing that the real aggressor against Norway was Churchill, and Raeder should never been convicted at Nuremberg. The American historian Norman Goda wrote that Raeder's champions usually spoke if aggression against Norway was the only thing that Raeder had been convicted of, and that campaign to free Raeder rested upon "... a quasi-legal argument mixed with moral equivalency and wilful ignorance". Goda charged that Erika Raeder and her friends had grossly quoted out of context certain passages from Churchill's 1948 book The Gathering Storm to support their claim that the invasion of Norway was a "preventive war" forced on the Third Reich while ignoring the evidence that had convicted Raeder at Nuremberg. Starting in 1950, the government of Konrad Adenauer started a quiet diplomatic offensive aimed at freeing Raeder and the rest of the men in Spandau. An American diplomat Richard Lynch reported back to Washington in 1954 that public opinion in West Germany was all for freeing Raeder and the rest of the men convicted in Nuremberg, and until the admirals in Spandau were freed, "the feelings does exist and ... until some way can be found to overcome it, a future German Navy will not have the support of its former officers". The retired Admiral Gerhard Wagner had told Lynch that many Kriegsmarine officers would liked to join the new Bundesmarine in order to fight the Soviets should World War Three break out, but refused to do so as long as Raeder and Dönitz were still prisoners. It was the position of the United States government in the 1950s that Raeder should be freed, ostensibly for reasons of health, but in fact because of the demands of the Cold War and the need to integrate West Germany into NATO.

=== Last years ===
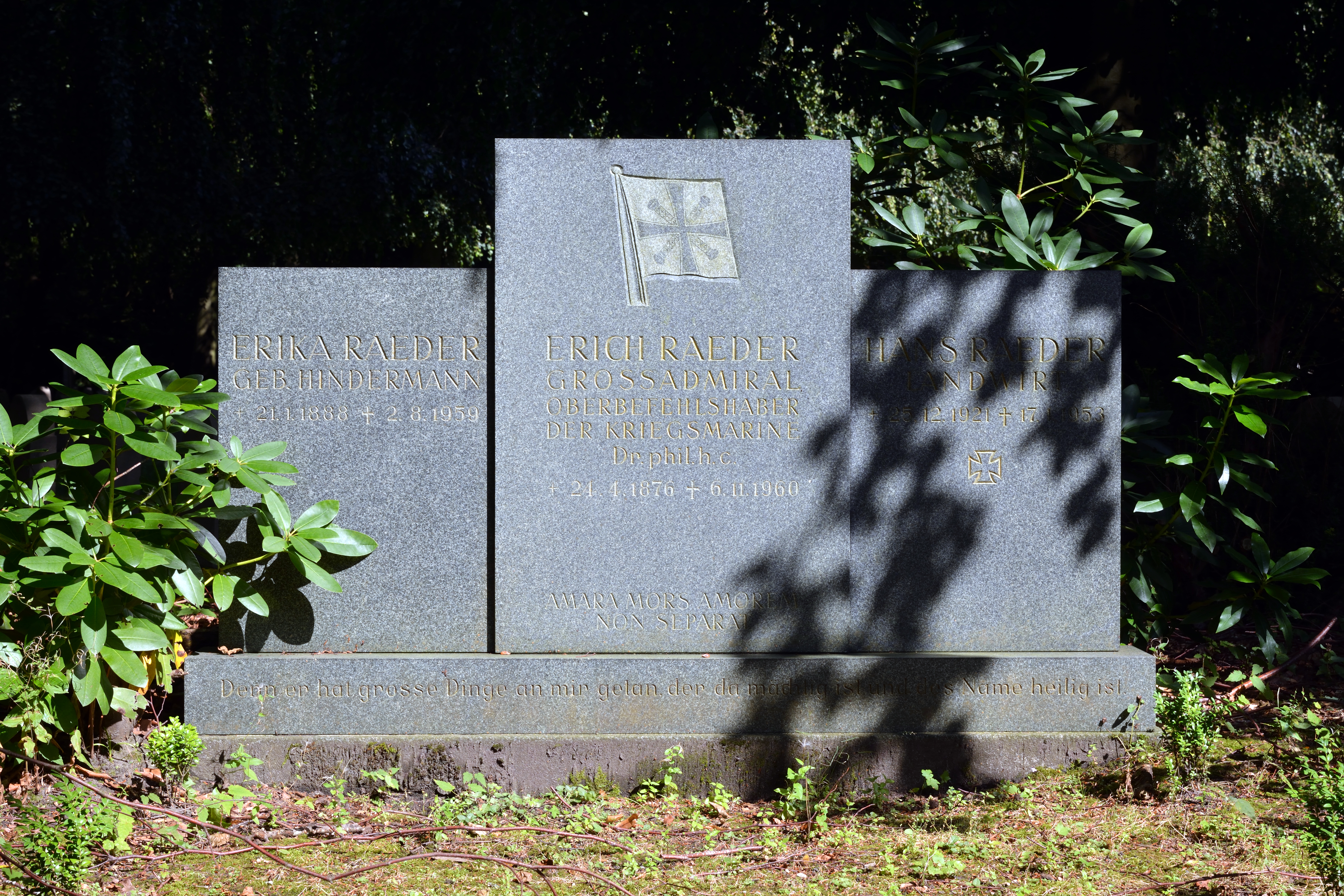
Raeder's Grave in Kiel

The sentence was later reduced and, due to ill health, he was released at 11:35 on 26 September 1955. After his release he settled down at the Uhlandstrasse in Lippstadt, Westphalia. He later wrote an autobiography, Mein Leben (My Life), in 1957. Mein Leben was ghost-written by a committee of former Kriegsmarine officers headed by Admiral Erich Förste with Raeder's role limited to reviewing the chapters and either giving his approval or sending it back to the committee. Mein Leben was intended to be a sort of "official history" that would rebut the "Nuremberg version" of history, and hence the book devoted a disproportionate amount of space to attacking point by point the verdict of Nuremberg. One of the major changes that the committee imposed on Raeder was to suppress his feud with Dönitz, and instead presented relations between the two admirals as one of friendship, respect and mutual harmony. This was done largely to avoid repeating the situation of the 1920s where dueling memoirs by various Great War admirals blaming each other for the defeat had done considerable damage to the image of the navy; instead there was to be a "united front" on the history of the navy. In addition, there was a tendency in the 1950s to present Wehrmacht leaders as noble and high-minded and thus morally superior to the Allied commanders who had defeated them with the implication that the wrong side had won. Allowing Raeder to pursue his feud with Dönitz in print as he wanted to would have made him look petty, jealous and vindictive, and thus damaged the image of the Wehrmacht leaders as noble and tragic figures. Leaders of veterans' groups made it clear to both Raeder and Dönitz that they wanted a "united front" on history, and neither of them would be welcome at veterans' gatherings if they made their feud public.

In Mein Leben, it was argued that "the deadly effect of the terms of the Treaty of Versailles" justified rearmament in the 1930s, and used the "sacrifice" of the Anglo-German Naval Agreement of 1935 to prove Germany was not pursuing aggressive policies. In Mein Leben, it was stated the Treaty of Versailles was "completely unrealistic" had it had "shackled" the German people by enforced "... subjugation, including confiscation of national territory, occupation and military control, disregard for a people's sovereignty and corresponding humiliation ...", and as such it was the Versailles treaty and the Versailles treaty alone that was responsible for the Third Reich. It was claimed that Raeder as "apolitical" officer who had just been doing his duty to the Fatherland borne no legal or moral guilt for anything that had happened under the Third Reich, and that the real responsibility for Nazi crimes rested with the governments of the United Kingdom, France and the United States who had imposed the Treaty of Versailles on Germany. It was claimed that the Allies had "good reason" to forbid using resistance against Versailles as a defense at Nuremberg because Nazi Germany was a "direct consequence of the situation created by the victorious enemy powers in 1918". Along the same lines, it was charged that the Nuremberg trial of 1945–46 was meant by the Allies to cover up the "decisive part" played by the Versailles treaty in causing Nazi Germany and the war crimes committed by the Allies "... by damning the whole German nation as an international outlaw" and it was "... the German people as a whole who were to be indicted as the sole criminals, guilty of waging a malevolent war of aggression". As such, the Nuremberg trials were presented as having nothing to do with justice, but instead were a political show trial. The Commando Order, the cash payments from the Konto 5 slush fund and Raeder's calls for war with the United States were not mentioned in Mein Leben. Instead it was claimed Raeder was opposed to war with the United States and had always worked to protect neutral shipping during the war with the committee having Raeder say: "We had to consider neutrals to avoid any possible unfortunate incidents" at sea. The invasion of Norway was presented as a measure to protect Norway's neutrality from Britain, and Raeder claimed to have been a "political prisoner" at Spandau. Finally, Raeder was presented as a victim of Hitler with the committee having Raeder say "It was the tragedy of my life that our future took a completely different path". Dönitz also headed the call for the "united front". Besides for the Z Plan, which Dönitz called a huge mistake, Dönitz's memoirs presented Raeder in a favorable light, leading the British historian Peter Padfield to remark "It is an open question which of the two Grand Admirals produced the more deliberately dishonest volume".

Raeder greatly enjoyed attending and speaking at gatherings of Kriegsmarine veterans, which were one of the chief joys of the last five years of his life. Through Raeder generally preferred to keep a low-profile, his frequent appearances at veterans' rallies ensured that from time to time his name made news. In early 1956, the City of Kiel decided to publicly give back to Raeder the Ehrenbürger ("honorary citizen") status which the Nazis had awarded him and which been taken away by the British in 1945; after attracting much negative media attention all over the world, Raeder was secretly asked by the city government to decline the award. The governments of Norway and Denmark both submitted notes of protest, complaining it was outrageous for the Kiel government to honour a man who been convicted of aggression against their nations. Editors of all Danish newspapers sent a joint public letter to Theodor Heuss that called the planned award an "unfriendly act" that showed contempt for the feelings of the people of Denmark, and asked him to give back his Ehrenbürger of Kiel status if Raeder was given back his. Raeder formally declined the honour to save embarrassing the Kiel government, but the entire episode embittered him, and he complained that he felt like an outcast.

Another debate that brought Raeder's name into the news had started in January 1956 when Captain Karl-Adolf Zenker of the Bundesmarine gave a speech before a group of cadets, which he had mentioned he had shown to Raeder in advance for his approval, during which Zenker argued not only for the innocence of Raeder and Dönitz whom Zenker called officers just doing their duty in "... a war thrust upon them", but also called Raeder and Dönitz great heroes who should be role models when the cadets became officers. Zenker's speech was so controversial that a special session of the Bundestag was called in March 1956 to debate the issue of whether Raeder and Dönitz were the sort of examples that Bundesmarine officers should be following. The leading defender of Zenker's speech was the CDU politician Commander Hellmuth Heye, who once been an officer in the Kriegsmarine. Heye who argued that all of the anti-Semitic statements made by Raeder and Dönitz were historically unimportant because neither had been convicted of crimes against humanity, suggesting these statements were forced on them by the Nazi regime and claimed that Raeder was opposed to anti-Semitism because of his efforts to protect officers who were Mischlinge. Heye argued that as officers both Raeder and Dönitz had no choice, but to follow orders to fight for their country; claimed that officers bear "no political responsibility" for following orders, and their convictions were due to a "post-war psychosis". Heye ended his speech that both Raeder and Dönitz were heroic men and excellent officers who had kept up morale in the Kriegsmarine to the very end despite heavy casualties, and he hoped that every German would see them as role models. The Social Democratic politician Carlo Schmid read out in the Bundestag the anti-Semitic lines from Raeder's Heroes' Day Speech of 1939; noted that Raeder had not only refused to apologise for that speech, but testified at Nuremberg in 1946 that he believed that Germany was threatened by 'International Jewry'; and argued that for Germans to have a better future meant Raeder could not be a role model or seen as a hero as Zenker and Heye wanted. The Free Democrat Erich Mende in a speech before the Bundestag noted that Raeder had accepted bribes from Hitler, and that alone should have disqualified Raeder from being presented as a hero to the next generation of Germans. Raeder spent his last years complaining endlessly of how he had been wrongly convicted of war crimes at Nuremberg, maintaining that the Kriegsmarine had fought a "clean war" and that the service had been an apolitical force that had nothing to do with National Socialism.

In his 2002 book Die Wehrmacht, the German historian Wolfram Wette wrote that claims made by Raeder and other admirals that the Kriegsmarine had nothing to do with the Holocaust was false, and several Kriegsmarine units had massacred Jews during the war. Wette stated that the Kriegsmarine had been just as much a part of the genocidal machinery of the National Socialist state as the SS and the Army were. In 1994, the American historian Gerhard Weinberg wrote that most successful Kriegsmarine operation by far of the entire war was Operation Hannibal, and that: "In these tasks, the remnant German Navy was surprisingly successful. It proved to be best in those missions which the founders and leaders of the Imperial and Nazi Navy had pushed aside to pursue world-wide ambitions and offensives; those few who once argued for a navy attuned to coastal and defensive needs were proved right after all". The American historian Charles Thomas in his 1990 book The German Navy in the Nazi Era wrote that in October–November 1918 when confronted with a pointless battle in a war that was already lost that was likely to send them all to a watery grave, the sailors of the High Seas Fleet mutinied in order to live. Thomas wrote that the great achievement of Raeder and Dönitz was to avoid a repeat of the High Seas Fleet mutiny, and instead ensured that thousands of Germans time after time willingly went to their deaths at sea without protest for the greater glory of Adolf Hitler and although it was increasingly becoming clear as time went by that the war was lost, making their deaths utterly senseless.

Erich Raeder died in Kiel on 6 November 1960. He is buried in the Nordfriedhof (North Cemetery), Kiel. Former Grand Admiral Karl Dönitz attended his Funeral on 12 November 1960.
