= Paul Lawrence =

Paul Lawrence may refer to:

- Paul Ogden Lawrence (1861–1952), British barrister and judge
- Paul Lawrence (sociologist) (Paul Roger Lawrence, 1922–2011), American sociologist
- Paul Lawrence (government official) (Paul Reynold Lawrence, born c. 1956) American government official

== See also ==
- Paul Laurence (born 1958), American songwriter, producer and keyboardist
