= Florence Gerald =

American writer, stage actress (1858–1942)

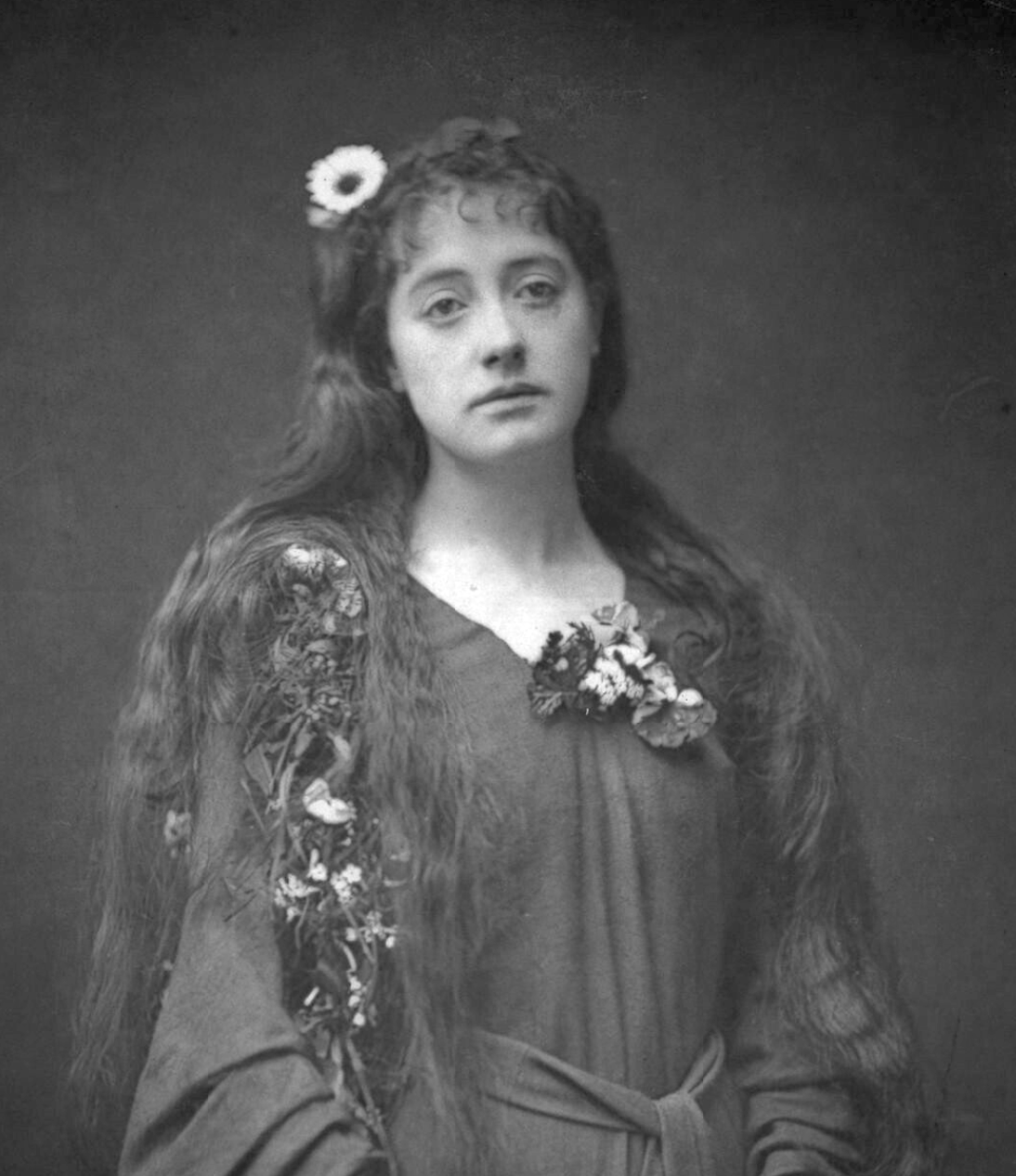
- Gerald, 1880
- Born: Florence Melton Gerald; September 23, 1858; New Orleans, Louisiana, U.S.
- Died: September 6, 1942 (aged 83); New York City, New York, U.S.
- Burial place: Kensico Cemetery
- Education: Waco University
- Occupations: Stage actress, poet, writer

Florence Melton Gerald (1858–1942) was an American stage actress, poet, and writer. She was known for her acting roles in Broadway theatre.

== Early life and education ==
Florence Melton Gerald was born on September 23, 1858, in New Orleans, to parents Omega Melton (1836–1918) and Judge George Bruce Gerald (1835–1914). Her maternal grandfather James G. Melton had owned the only hotel at Washington-on-the-Brazos, Texas in the 19th-century, which had been a gathering place on March 2, 1836, after Texas Declaration of Independence, and was once home to the original Texas Liberty Bell.

Gerald attended Waco University (now Baylor University) in Waco, Texas, where she studied poetry and graduated in 1873, and in 1880. She published the book, Adenheim and Other Poems (1880).

== Career ==
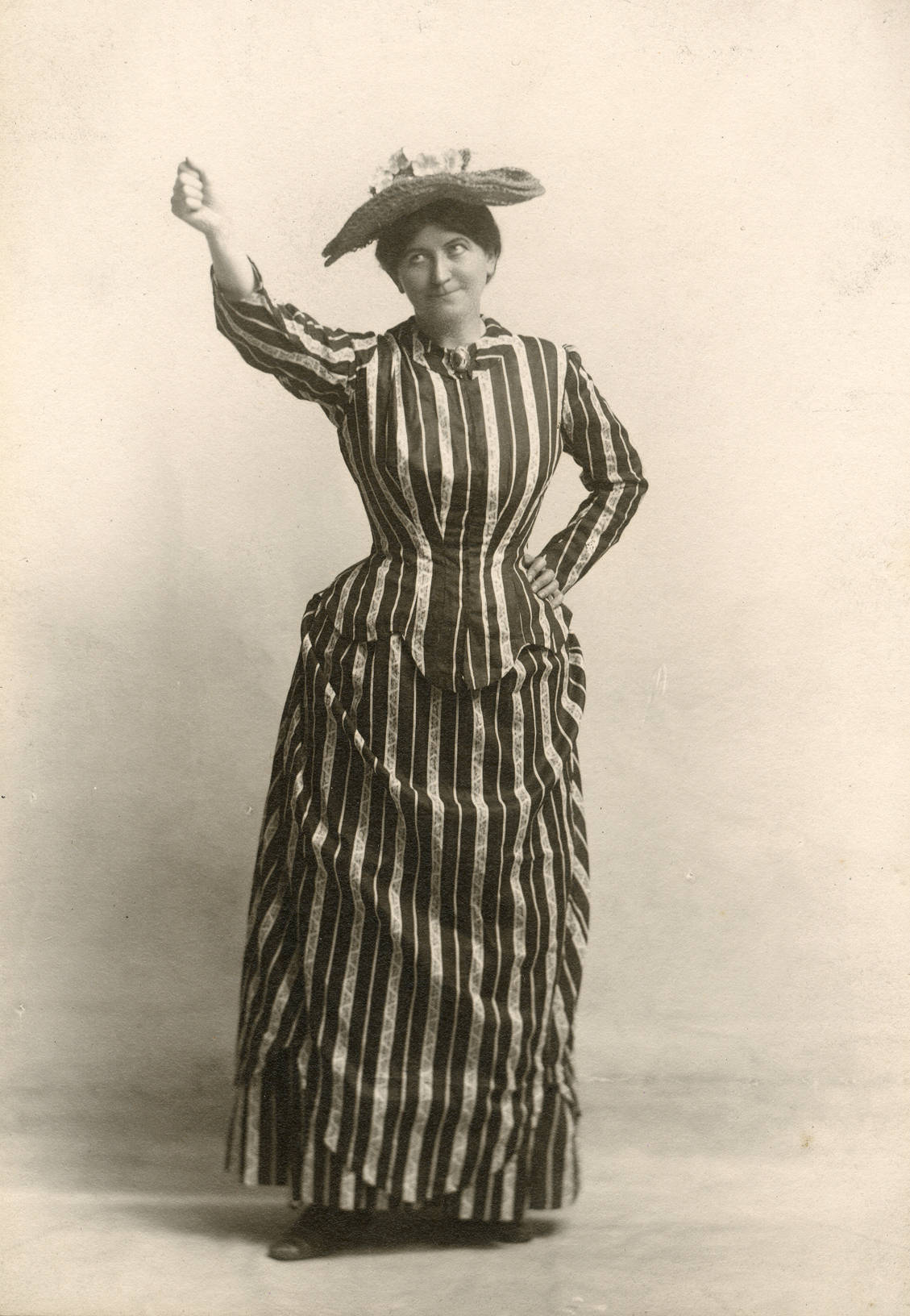
Gerald, 1904

After graduation, she was hired as an elocution instructor (public speaking) at Waco Female College. Her interest in working as a playwright started after her graduation.

In 1898, she headed for the theater district in New York City to begin her stage acting career. Under the management of Charles Frohman, Gerald started her acting career on Broadway in, The Girl from Maxim’s (1898) at the Grand Opera House.

Gerald wrote the play, The Woman Pays, which was adapted into the 1915 silent film by screenwriter Harry Chandlee.

She appeared in the R. L. McLaughlin Stock Co. at the Ohio Theatre in Cleveland, Ohio in the summer of 1924.

Gerald died at age 83, on September 6, 1942, at the St. James Hotel at Broadway and 26th Street in New York City. She is buried at Kensico Cemetery in Valhalla, Westchester County, New York in the Actors' Fund area.

== Theater ==
List of Gerald's theater roles
Date(s)	Title	Role	Location	Notes
June 1894	The Two Orphans	Countess de Liniers	Broadway Lyceum, Buffalo, New York	
Aug. 29, 1899 – Oct. 1899	The Girl from Maxim's	Mme. Petypont	Grand Opera House, New York City, Criterion Theatre, New York City	Hyde and Benham
1899	The Angel of the Alley	Mrs. Bennett	New York City	directed by Theo Kremer
Feb. 17, 1903 – April 30, 1903	Resurrection	Aunt Mary	Hammerstein's Victoria, New York City	
Dec. 22, 1909 – Jan. 15, 1910	The Goddess of Liberty	Lady FitzHugh Murray	Weber's Music Hall, New York City	musical play produced by Joseph E. Howard
Dec. 24, 1913 – Jan. 1, 1914	We Are Seven		Maxine Elliott's Theatre, New York City	
May 5, 1914 – May 31, 1914	The Charm of Isabel		Maxine Elliott's Theatre, New York City	
May 25, 1920 – May 31, 1920	An Innocent Idea	Mrs. Case	Fulton Theatre, New York City	
Aug. 30, 1920 – Sept. 1, 1920	Immodest Violet	Mrs. Amantha Rose	48th Street Theatre, New York City	
April 17, 1923 – April 28, 1923	Within Four Walls	Louisa Minuit	Selwyn Theatre, New York City	directed by Mack Hilliard
Oct. 16, 1923–June 15, 1924	The Shame Woman	Martha Case	Greenwich Village Theatre, New York City	
Feb. 10, 1925 – May 1, 1925	The Rat	Mme. Colline	Astor Theatre, New York City, New York	produced by Earl Carroll
Nov. 16, 1926 – Dec. 1, 1926	Lily Sue	Phronia	Lyceum Theatre, New York City	
Jan. 18, 1927 – July 30, 1927	The Barker	Maw Benson	Princess Theatre, New York City, Biltmore Theatre, New York City	produced by Charles L. Wagner
Mar. 8, 1927 –Mar. 31, 1927	The Heaven Tappers	Mrs. Gilson	Forrest Theatre, New York City	
Feb. 21, 1928 – Mar. 1, 1928	Maya	as 'mama'	Comedy Theatre, New York City	
Jan. 2, 1933 – Jan. 31, 1933	Saint Wench		Lyceum Theatre, New York City	
Dec. 10, 1934 –Jan. 26, 1935	Valley Forge	as 'auntie'	Guild Theatre, New York City	
Oct. 14, 1935	Tobacco Road	Ada Lester	Lyric Theatre, Allentown, Pennsylvania	
Dec. 14, 1937	Tobacco Road	Ada Lester	Paramount Theatre, Alexandria, Louisiana	
Dec. 31, 1937	Tobacco Road	Ada Lester	Plaza Theatre, Palm Springs, California	

== Publications ==
- Gerald, Florence M. (1880). Adenheim, And Other Poems. St. Louis, MO: G. I. Jones and Company. LCCN 27018203.
