= Frank R. Mills =

American actor

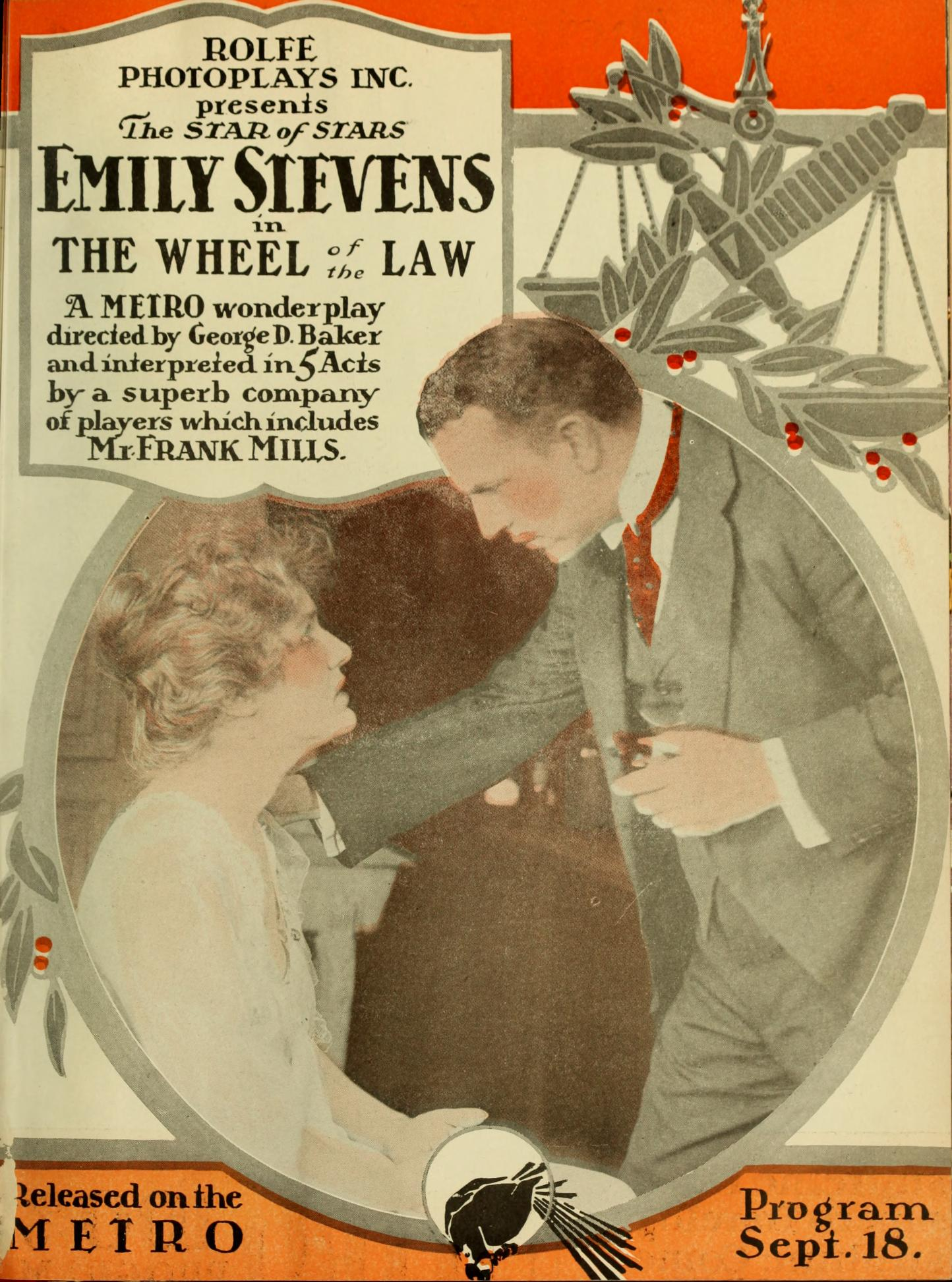
- Emily Stevens and Frank Mills in The Wheel of the Law
- Born: Frank Ransom Mills; January 24, 1868; Kendall, Michigan, US
- Died: June 11, 1921 (aged 53); Galesburg, Michigan, US
- Other name: Frank Mills
- Occupation: Actor
- Years active: 1890s-1921
- Spouse: Helen McBeth Loveland

Frank R. Mills (January 24, 1868 – June 11, 1921) was an American stage and silent film actor. In the 1890s he acted in a number of plays as a young juvenile.

He is frequently mistaken for other actors with the name Frank Mills. He began in films in 1906 in the historic Australian feature The Story of the Kelly Gang.

He died in an insane asylum in June 1921. He was married to Helen MacBeth.

== Plays ==
- The Way of the World (1901) *with Elsie De Wolfe

== Filmography ==
Film
Year	Film	Role	Notes
1906	The Story of the Kelly Gang	Ned Kelly	Incomplete
1911	The Sundowner	Undetermined role	Lost
1915	The Foundling		Scenes deleted
1915	The Lily and the Rose	Undetermined role	Uncredited, Final reel missing
1915	The Edge of the Abyss	Wayne Burroughs	Lost
1915	The Golden Claw	Bert Werden	Lost
1916	The Moral Fabric	Scott Winthrop	
1916	The House of Mirrors	Fred Probert	
1916	The Wheel of the Law	John Norton	Lost
1916	The Flower of Faith	Hugh Lee	Lost
1917	As Man Made Her	Mason Forbes	
1917	House of Cards	Mr. Mannning	
1917	To-Day	Fred Norton	Lost
1917	The Price of Pride	Jeffrey Arnold Black	Lost
1917	A Sleeping Memory	Powers Fiske	
1917	The Eternal Mother	Dwight Alden	
1918	De Luxe Annie	Walter Kendal	
1918	The Unchastened Woman	Hubert Knolleys	
1918	Wives of Men	James Randolph Emerson Jr.	Lost
1918	The Silent Woman	John Lowery	Lost
1918	Wild Honey	Rev. Jim Brown - Pastor Holbrook	
1919	Twilight	Jim Anwell	
1919	Let's Elope	Hilary Farrington	Lost
