= The Unchastened Woman =

1925 film

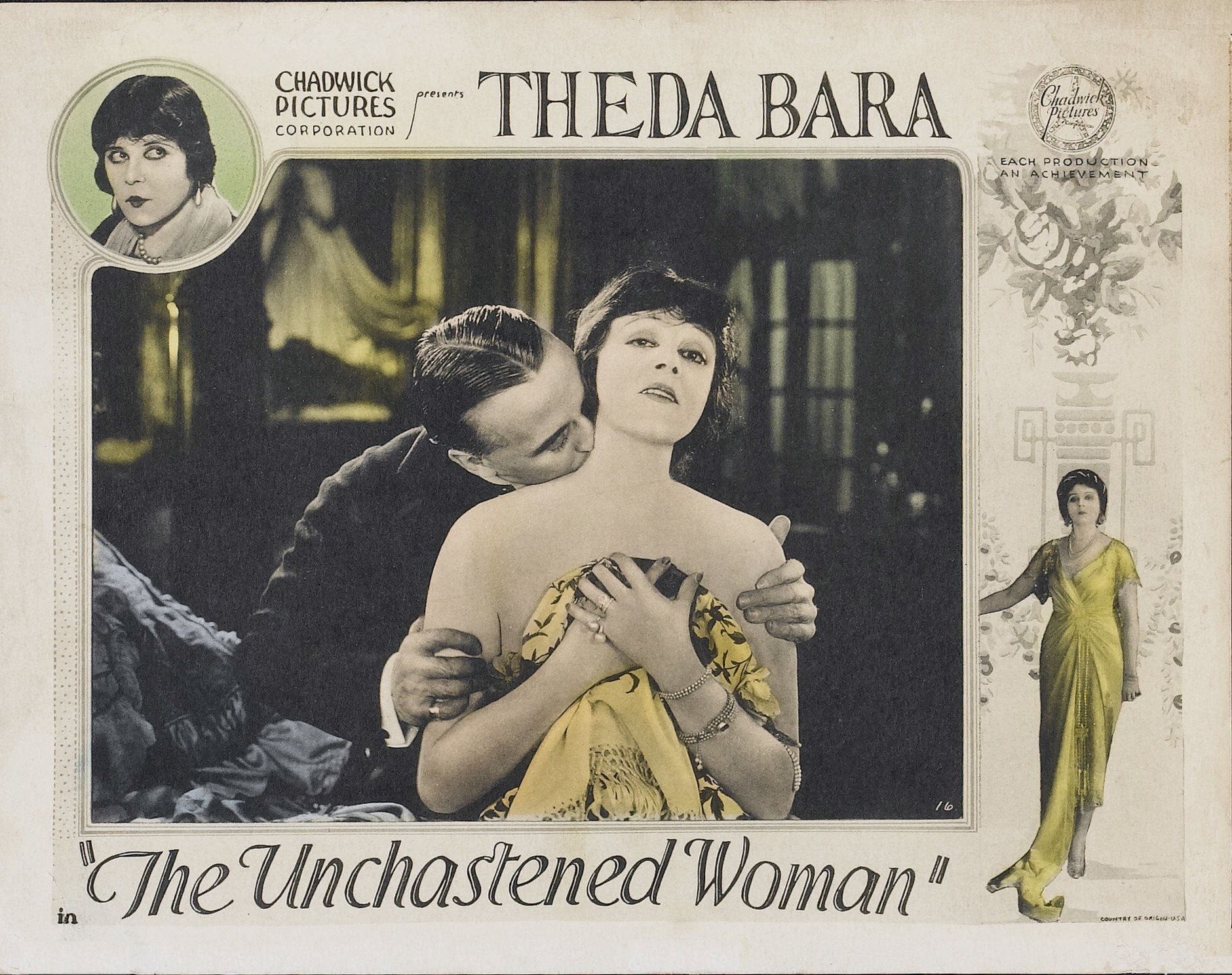
- Lobby card
- Directed by: James Young
- Written by: Douglas Z. Doty (scenario)
- Based on: The Unchastened Woman by Louis K. Anspacher
- Starring: Theda Bara; Wyndham Standing; Dale Fuller
- Cinematography: L. William O'Connell
- Edited by: Sam Zimbalist
- Distributed by: Chadwick Pictures
- Release date: November 16, 1925
- Running time: 52 minutes
- Country: United States
- Language: Silent (English intertitles)

The full film

The Unchastened Woman is a 1925 American silent drama film starring vamp Theda Bara, directed by James Young, the former husband of Clara Kimball Young, and released by start-up studio Chadwick Pictures. The film is based on a 1915 Broadway play, The Unchastened Woman, which starred Emily Stevens.

This was Bara's "comeback" film but turned out to be her final feature appearance and is one of her few surviving films. The play was also filmed in 1918 with Grace Valentine.

== Plot ==
As described in a film magazine review, Caroline Knollys detects an intrigue between her husband Hubert and his gold digging secretary Emily Madden. Caroline goes abroad and, after her son is born, becomes a reigning belle. Eventually, she returns home, but keeps her husband in ignorance of the baby boy's birth and retires to a country estate. Hubert repents, but Caroline is obdurate. Because she has been flirting outrageously as part of her revenge, the jealous husband pays an unexpected visit to her, hoping to discover evidence to support a divorce. Instead, Caroline presents him to his son. Husband and wife are reconciled.

== Cast ==
- Theda Bara as Caroline Knollys
- Wyndham Standing as Hubert Knollys
- Dale Fuller as Hildegarde Sanbury
- John Miljan as Lawrence Sanbury
- Harry Northrup as Michael Krellin
- Eileen Percy as Emily Madden
- Mayme Kelso as Susan Ambie
- Dot Farley
- Kate Price
- Eric Mayne
- Frederick Ko Vert
- Tetsu Komai

== Preservation ==
Prints of The Unchastened Woman are located in the Cineteca Del Friuli in Gemona del Friuli, George Eastman Museum Motion Picture Collection, and Academy Film Archive.
