= A Fool There Was (1915 film) =

1915 American silent film

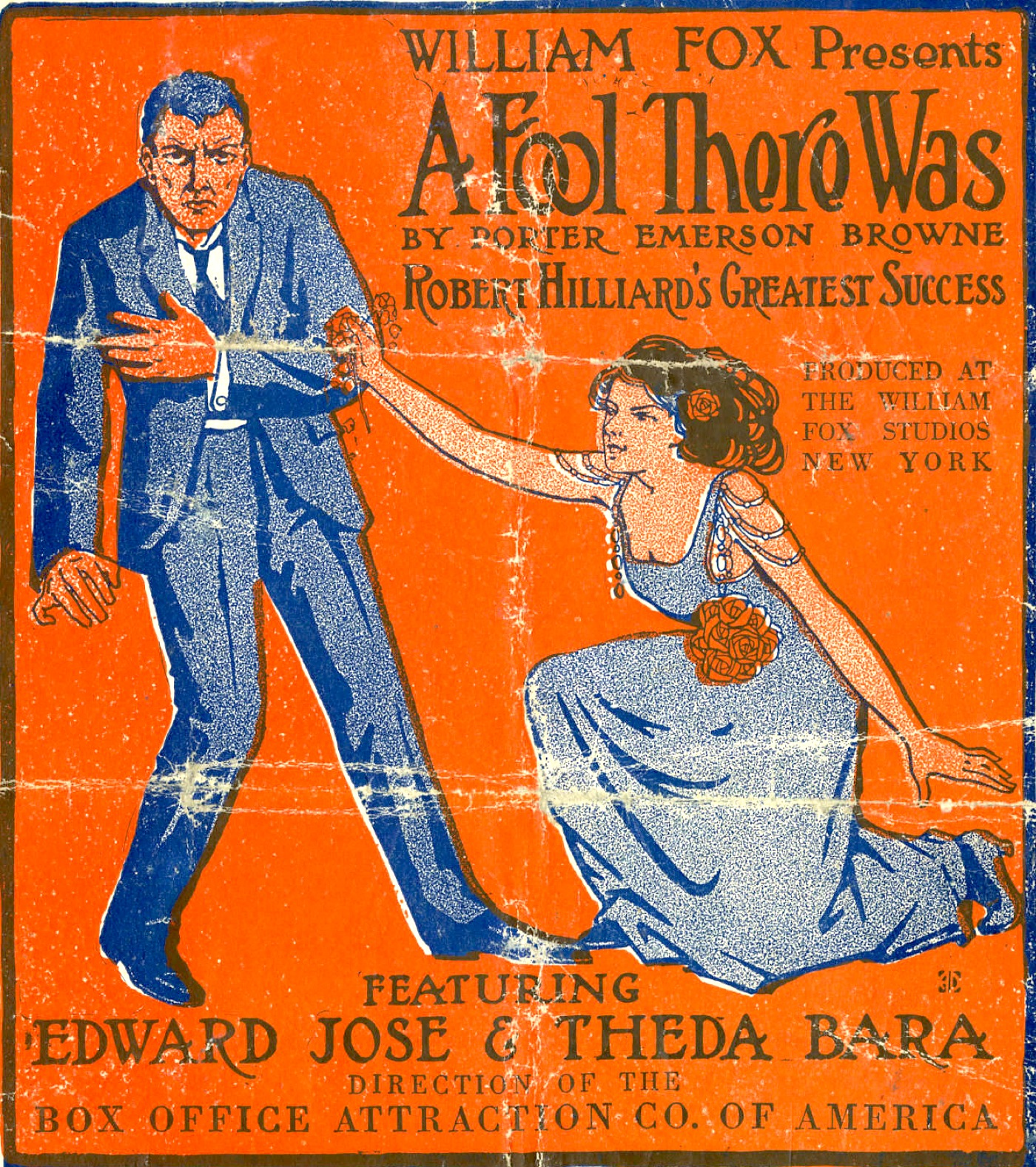
- Theatrical release poster
- Directed by: Frank Powell
- Written by: Roy L. McCardell (scenario); Frank Powell (adaptation)
- Based on: A Fool There Was by Porter Emerson Browne
- Produced by: William Fox
- Starring: Theda Bara; Edward José
- Cinematography: George Schneiderman
- Distributed by: Box Office Attraction Company, Fox Film Corporation (1918 re-release)
- Release dates: January 12, 1915; June 1918 (5-reels version)
- Running time: 66 minutes (1915 release)
- Country: United States
- Language: Silent (English intertitles)

A Fool There Was is a 1915 American silent drama film produced by William Fox, directed by Frank Powell, and starring Theda Bara. Upon release, the film was long considered controversial for such risqué intertitle cards as "Kiss me, my fool!"

A Fool There Was is one of the few extant films featuring Theda Bara. It popularised the word vamp (short for vampire), which describes a femme fatale who causes the moral degradation of those she seduces, first fascinating and then exhausting her victims.

In 2015, the United States Library of Congress selected the film for preservation in the National Film Registry, finding it "culturally, historically, or aesthetically significant".

== Plot ==
John Schuyler, a rich Wall Street lawyer and diplomat, is a husband and a devoted family man. He is sent to England on a diplomatic mission without his wife and daughter. On the ship he meets the "Vampire woman" – a psychic vampire described as "a woman of the vampire species" – who uses her charms to seduce men, only to leave after ruining their lives. Schuyler is yet another one of her victims who falls completely under her control. In the process of succumbing to her will, he abandons his family, loses his job and social standing, and becomes a raving drunkard. All attempts by his family to get him to return fail, and the hapless "fool" plunges ever deeper into physical and mental degradation.

== Cast ==
Full copy of the film; runtime 01:06:20

- Edward José as The Husband
- Theda Bara as The Vampire
- May Allison as The Wife's Sister
- Clifford Bruce as The Friend
- Victor Benoit as One of Her Victims
- Frank Powell as The Doctor
- Minna Gale as The Doctor's Fiancée
- Runa Hodges as The Child
- Mabel Frenyear as The Wife

== Basis ==
The film is based on the 1909 Broadway production A Fool There Was by Porter Emerson Browne, who in turn based his play on Rudyard Kipling's poem The Vampire. Katharine Kaelred played the role of seductress, billed as "The Woman". The star of the play was Victorian matinee idol Robert C. Hilliard. Hilliard's name featured prominently in some advertisements for the movie, though he had no connection with the film.

== Production ==
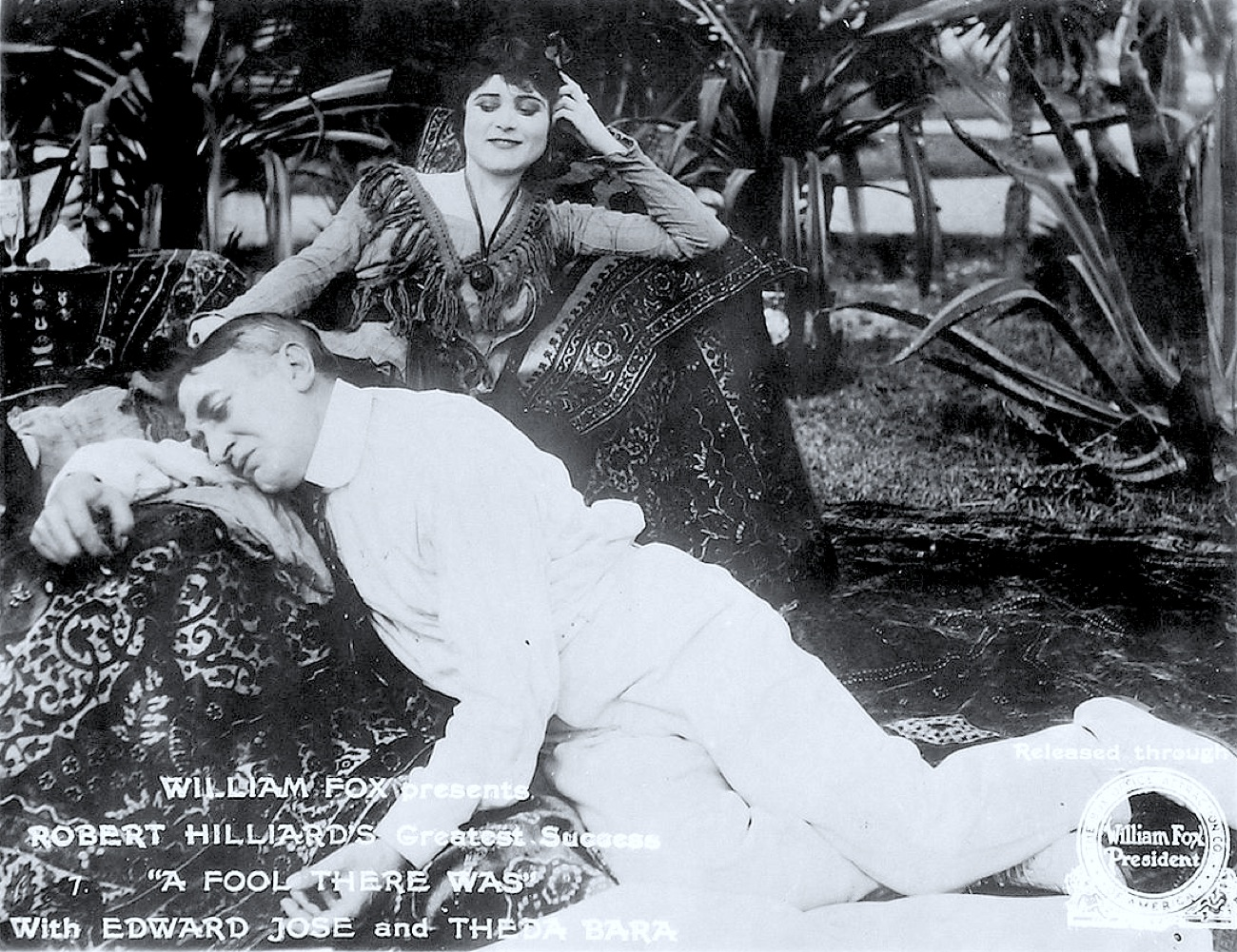
The "Vamp" (Theda Bara) and the wealthy family man she seduces and ruins, John Schuyler (Edward José)

The producers were keen to pay tribute to their literary source, having a real actor read the full poem to the audience before each initial showing, and presenting passages of the poem throughout the film in intertitles. Bara's official credit is even "The Vampire", and for this reason the film is sometimes cited as the first "vampire" movie. However, in the film as in Kipling's poem, the term is used metaphorically, as the character is not literally a vampire.

The film was the first on-screen appearance of World War I-era film actress May Allison (1890 – 1989). Scenes ostensibly set in England and Italy were actually shot in the USA: in St. Augustine, Florida, New York Harbor, and at Fox Studios in Fort Lee, New Jersey, which at the time was home to America's first motion picture industry.

== Release ==
The film was also a watershed in early film publicity. At a press conference in January 1915, the studio gave an elaborate fictional biography of Theda Bara, making her an exotic Arabian actress, and presented her in a flamboyant fur outfit. Then they made an intentional leak to the press that the whole thing was a hoax. This may have been one of Hollywood's first publicity stunts.

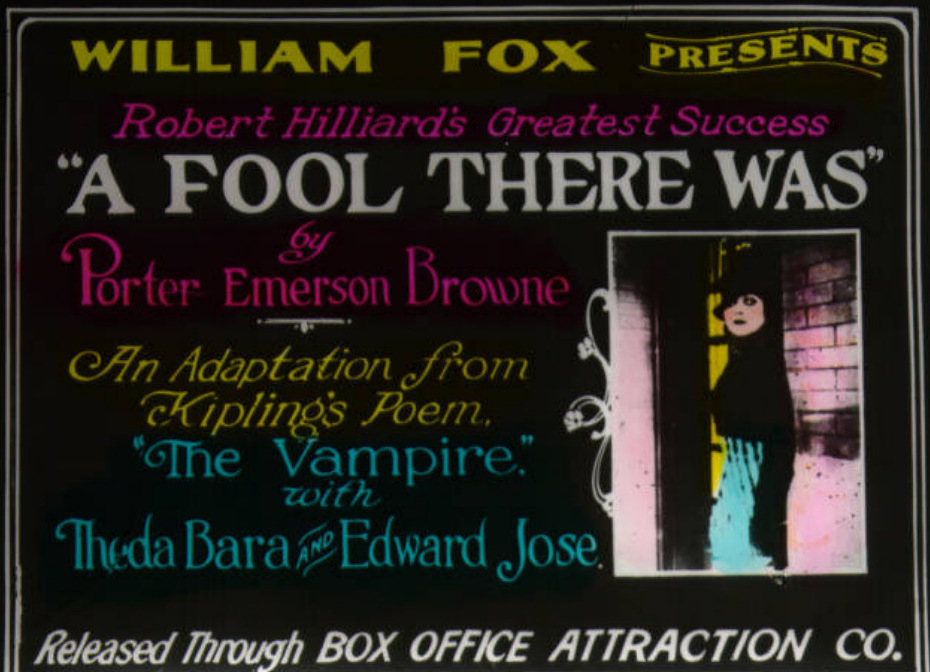
A Fool There Was lantern slide ad, 1915

Although part of the film takes place in the United Kingdom, the film was not approved by the British Board of Film Censors, per its policy of rejecting films with illicit sexual relationships. Although A Fool There Was never received a public showing in Great Britain, later Theda Bara films were allowed.

== Commentary ==
The film has been said to be unusual for the period in that the Husband does not experience a redemption, even when he hears the cries of his daughter, nor is the Vampire ever punished for destroying a family.

== Preservation ==
A Fool There Was is one of the few Theda Bara films in existence, with copies at the Museum of Modern Art, BFI National Archive, and other film archives. The other surviving Bara films are The Stain (1914), East Lynne (1916), The Unchastened Woman (1925), and two short comedies that she made for Hal Roach in the mid-1920s.

== Legacy ==
In 1938, Tex Avery released a cartoon called A Feud There Was.
