= Mabel Frenyear =

American actress

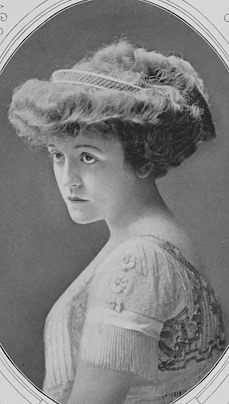
- Frenyear, from a 1909 publication
- Born: August 25, 1880; Brooklyn, New York City, New York, U.S.
- Died: unknown
- Occupation(s): Actress, chorus girl
- Spouses: Edward F. Dunn (m. 1900; div. 1904) Thomas R. Finucane (m. 1904; ann. 1904): Harry Young (m. 1940–?)

Mabel Frenyear was an American actress and chorus girl.

== Early life and career ==
Mabel Frenyear was born on August 25, 1880, the daughter of Edward L. Frenyear and Eva Tollman.

She began her career in Broadway theatre, appearing in plays such as The Girl in the Barracks (1899), The Stronger Sex (1908–1909), The Only Law (1909), Where There's a Will (1910), You Can Never Tell (1915), The Importance of Being Earnest (1921), and Montmartre (1922). She also appeared in productions of The Wizard of Oz, Babes in Toyland, Father and the Boys (1910), The 'Mind-the-Paint' Girl (1912), Nothing But the Truth (1916), and Kissing Time (1921).

Frenyear took chorus roles to prepare for her role as a chorus girl in The Only Law. A Minnesota reviewer in 1921 noted that Frenyear was "really pretty and plays her part with spirit." Her stage work was not always so admired; "If Miss Frenyear would not shriek her lines unintelligibly," commented one reviewer in 1915, "the worst defect of the production would be removed."

In addition to being a stage actress, Frenyear appeared in three silent films; A Fool There Was (1915), a Theda Bara vehicle, Tit for Tat (1915), a comedy, and Social Quicksands (1918), written by Katharine Kavanaugh. On her first trip to make films in Los Angeles in 1914, she made headlines for criticizing local women's fashion. "Southern California is a wonderland to me, but the women in Los Angeles; oh, they dress so terribly," she declared.

== Personal life ==
Frenyear married three times. On February 17, 1900, she married Edward F. Dunn. She only lived with Dunn for eight weeks, when he sold all her jewelry and gambled the proceeds; they divorced in 1904. On December 22, 1904, she married Thomas R. Finucane in Chicago, Illinois. Their marriage was almost immediately annulled because both parties admitted they were "married while intoxicated". In 1911, she was rumored to have married her co-star, Ralph Kellard, but both "laughed at the mere idea". And on April 27, 1940, she married her third husband, Harry Young, in Chicago. Her date of death is unknown.
