= Outwitted =

Outwitted may refer to:

- Outwitted (1917 film), an American silent drama film directed by George D. Baker
- Outwitted (1925 film), an American silent drama film directed by J. P. McGowan
