= The Unchastened Woman (1918 film) =

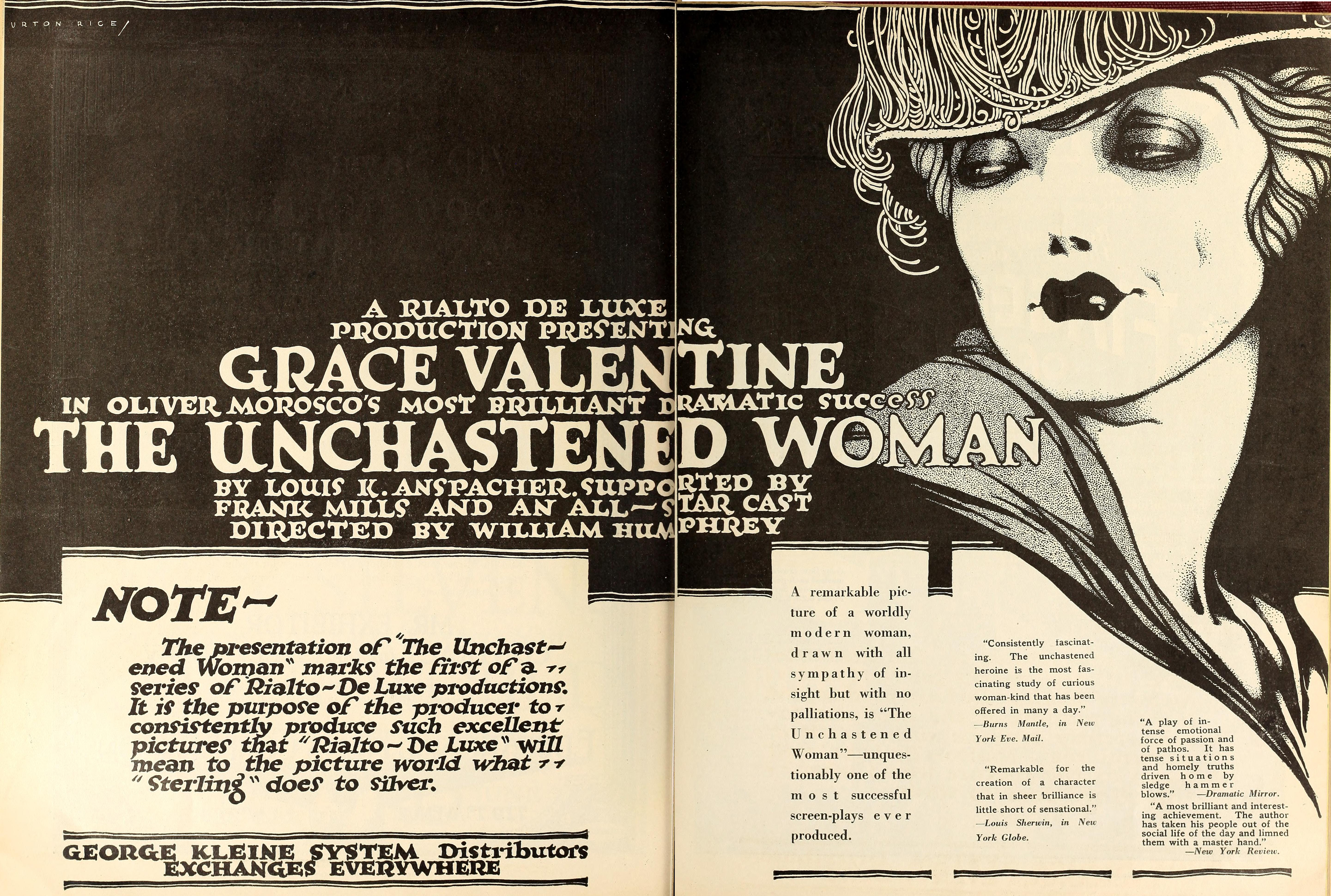
- poster
- Directed by: William J. Humphrey
- Written by: George Edwardes Hall; William Humphrey
- Based on: play The Unchastened Woman by Louis K. Anspacher c.1915
- Produced by: Rialto De Luxe Productions
- Starring: Grace Valentine
- Distributed by: George Kleine System; World Film Corporation(from April 1919)
- Release date: May 21, 1918
- Running time: 7 reels
- Country: USA
- Languages: Silent; English titles

The Unchastened Woman is a lost 1918 silent film drama directed by William J. Humphrey and starring Grace Valentine. The film was based on the 1915 play The Unchastened Woman which starred Emily Stevens on Broadway. Theda Bara appeared in a 1925 version which was her comeback film after 4 years.

== Cast ==
- Grace Valentine - Caroline Knolleys
- Mildred Manning - Emily Madden
- Catherine Tower - Hildegard Sanbury
- Edna Hunter - Susan Ambie
- Frank R. Mills - Hubert Knolleys
- Adelaide Barker - Mrs. Murtha
- Victor Sutherland - Lawrence Sanbury
- Paul Panzer - Michael Krellin
- Mike Donlin - O'Brien
- John Hopkins - The Man
