= The Silent Woman (film) =

1918 film directed by Herbert Blaché

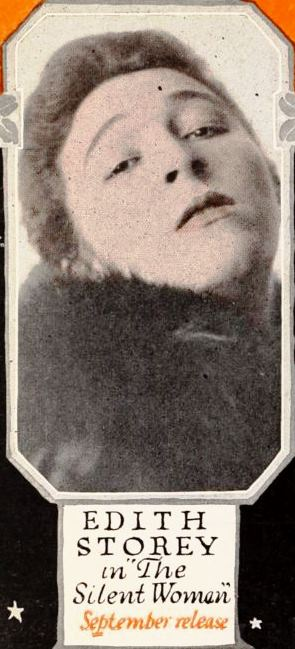
- Poster for The Silent Woman (1918)
- Directed by: Herbert Blaché
- Screenplay by: June Mathis (scenario); Katharine Kavanaugh (scenario)
- Story by: Lois Zellner
- Produced by: Maxwell Karger
- Starring: Edith Storey; Frank Mills; Joseph Kilgour
- Cinematography: George K. Hollister
- Production company: Metro Pictures
- Release date: September 2, 1918 (US)
- Running time: 5 reels
- Country: United States
- Language: English

The Silent Woman is a 1918 American silent drama film, directed by Herbert Blaché. It stars Edith Storey, Frank Mills, and Joseph Kilgour, and was released on September 2, 1918.

== Cast list ==
- Edith Storey as Nan McDonald
- Frank R. Mills as John Lowery
- Joseph Kilgour as Clifford Beresford
- Lila Leslie as Mary Lowery
- Mathilde Brundage as Mrs. Elton
- Baby Ivy Ward as Little Billy
- George S. Stevens as Doctor
- T. Tamamoto as Servant
- Augusta Perry as Maid
- Harry Linson as Lumberjack
- Ben Walker as Lumberjack
- John Cohill as Lumberjack

== Production ==
A Hudson Bay trading post, as a filming set-piece, was constructed in Bedford, New York.
