= The Far Cry =

1926 film

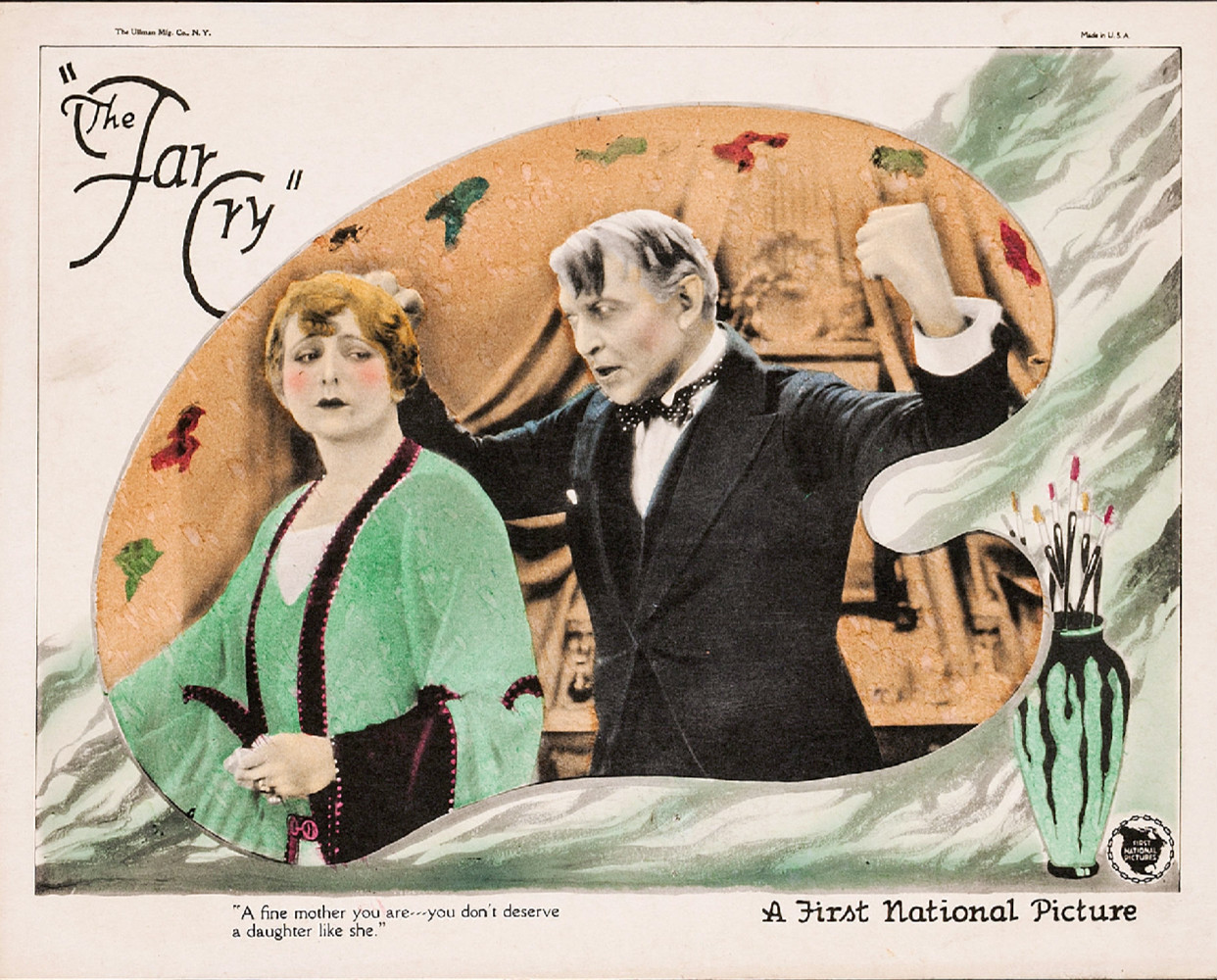
- Lobby card with Myrtle Stedman and Hobart Bosworth
- Directed by: Silvano Balboni
- Written by: Katharine Kavanaugh (adaptation)
- Based on: The Far Cry by Arthur Richman
- Starring: Blanche Sweet
- Cinematography: John W. Boyle
- Edited by: Alexander Hall
- Distributed by: First National Pictures
- Release date: February 14, 1926
- Running time: 80 minutes
- Country: United States
- Language: Silent (English intertitles)

The Far Cry (Portuguese title: Um Divorcio Feliz) is a 1926 American silent epic drama film produced and distributed by the First National Pictures. The film was directed by Silvano Balboni, the husband of writer June Mathis, and starred screen veteran Blanche Sweet. It is based on a 1924 Broadway play of the same name by Arthur Richman.

== Plot ==
As described in a film magazine review, Claire Marsh gets married and then divorced from Max Fraisier, a French marquis in Paris, which costs her father Julian Marsh a small fortune. Staying in Europe, Claire meets Dick Clayton, an old school chum, who is studying art in Paris. Dick then goes to Paris, and Claire, acting as one of the "we moderns", follows. Because Claire refuses to consider being wed, they live together there without being married. Count Filippo Sturani, another suitor for Claire, makes Dick jealous. They have an argument regarding the Count, and Claire returns to Paris. Dick follows her and rescues her from a blaze that erupts at a gorgeous Roman banquet given in Claire's honor by the Count.

== Cast ==
- Blanche Sweet as Claire Marsh
- Jack Mulhall as Dick Clayton
- Myrtle Stedman as Louise Marsh
- Hobart Bosworth as Julian Marsh
- Leo White as Max Fraisier
- Julia Swayne Gordon as Helen Clayton
- William Austin as Eric Lancefield
- John Sainpolis as Count Filippo Sturani
- Dorothy Revier as Yvonne Beaudet
- Mathilde Comont as Maid

== Production ==
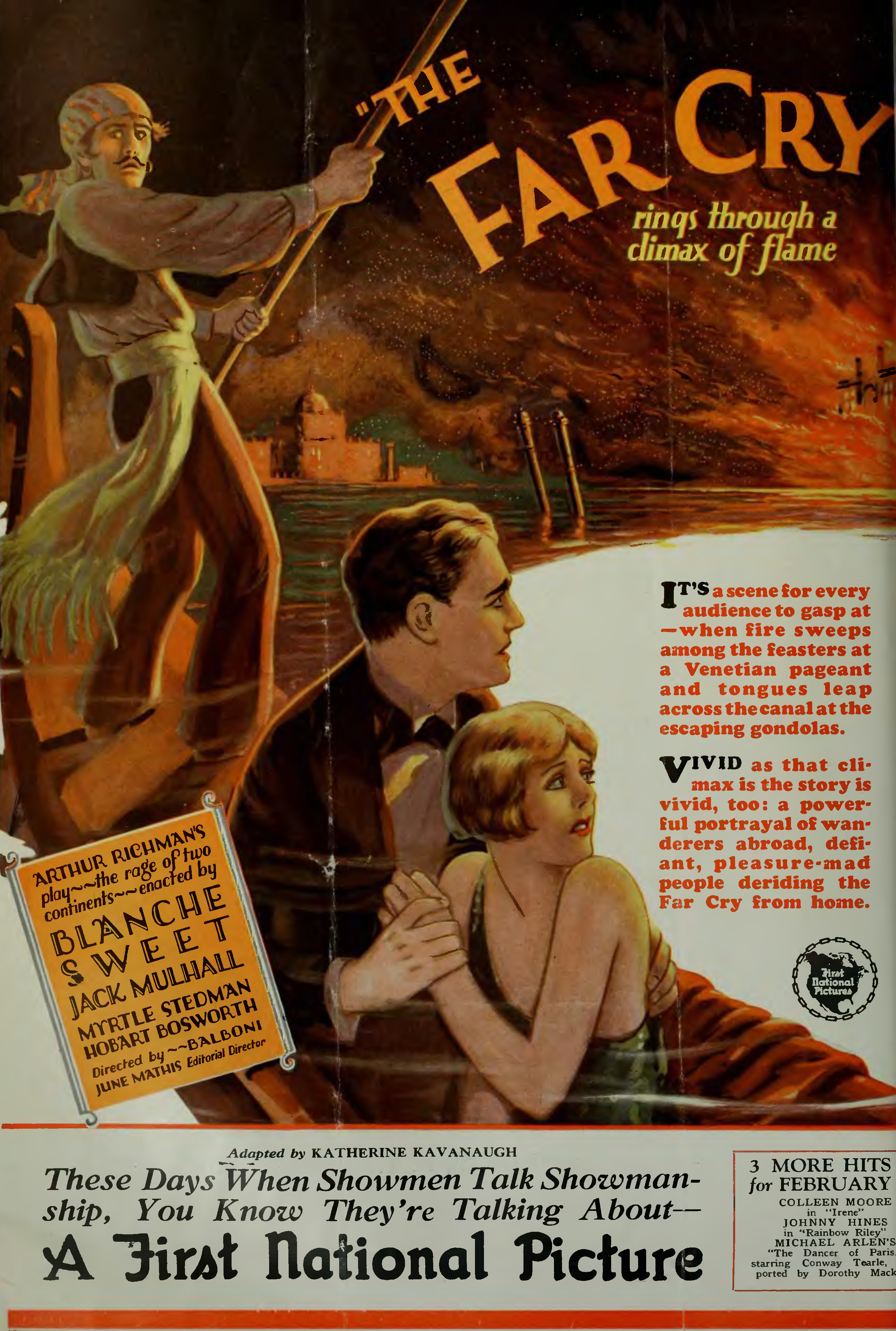
Advertisement in The Film Daily, 1926

The elaborate Roman banquet near the end of the movie was filmed in Technicolor. The title referred to the difference between the then moral code in Europe and the United States.

== Preservation ==
The Far Cry is now considered to be a lost film.

== See also ==
- List of early color feature films
