= A Man's World (1918 film) =

1918 silent film directed by Herbert Blaché

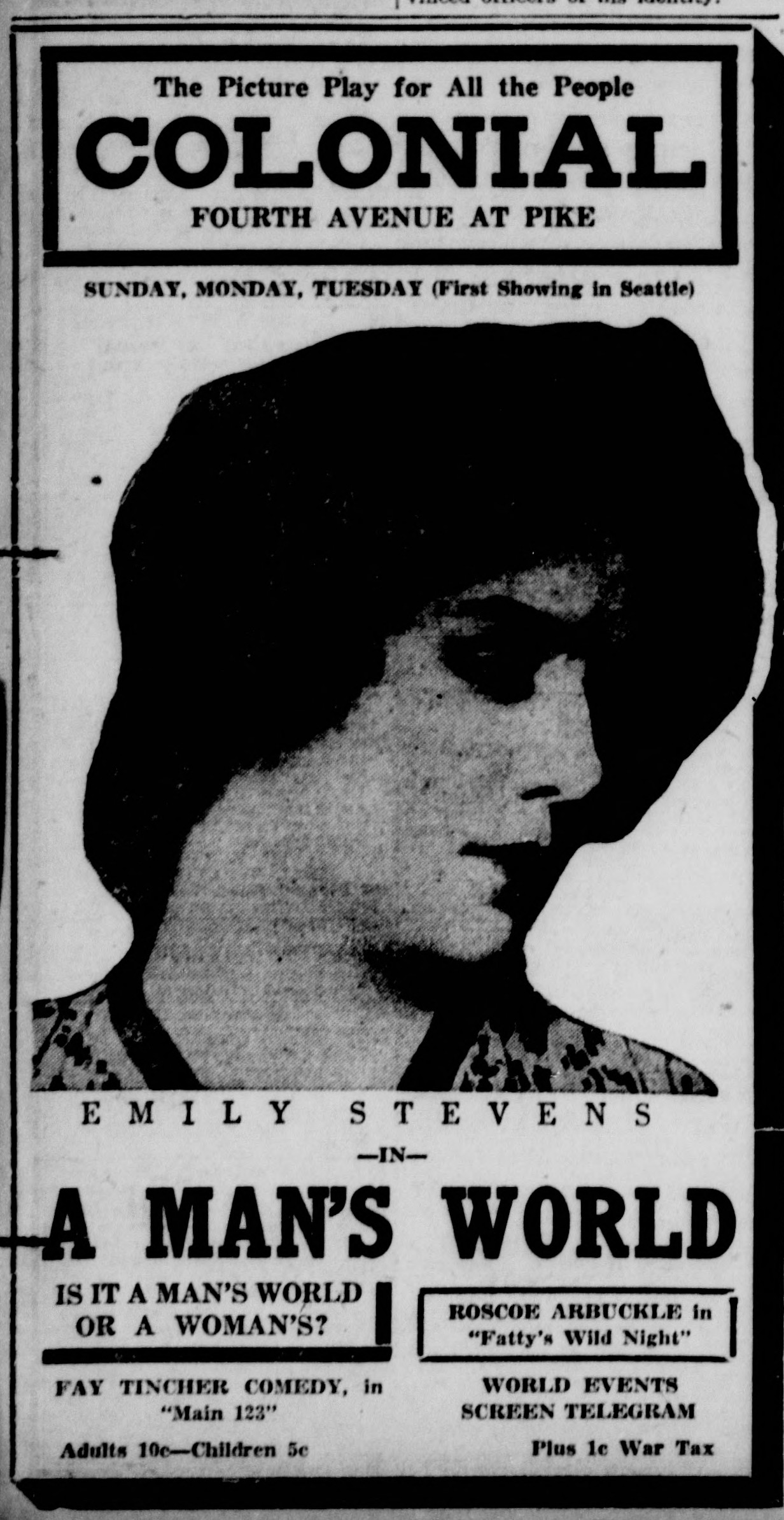
- Newspaper advertisement
- Directed by: Herbert Blaché
- Written by: June Mathis
- Based on: the play, A Man's World by Rachel Crothers
- Produced by: Maxwell Karger
- Starring: Emily Stevens; John Merkyl; Frederick Truesdell
- Cinematography: Eugene Gaudio
- Production company: Metro Pictures
- Release date: June 24, 1918 (US)
- Running time: 5 reels
- Country: United States
- Language: English

A Man's World is a 1918 American silent drama film, directed by Herbert Blaché. It stars Emily Stevens, John Merkyl, and Frederick Truesdell, and was released on June 24, 1918. It adapts the play of the same name by Rachel Crothers.

== Cast list ==
- Emily Stevens as Frankie Ware
- John Merkyl as David Powell (*aka Wilmuth Merkyl)
- Frederick Truesdell as Malcolm Gaskell
- Florence Short as Lione Brune
- Baby Ivy Ward as Kiddie
- Walter Hiers as Larry Hanlon
- Sidney Bracy as Emile Grimeaux
- Vera Royer as Clara Oakes
- Lucile Dorrington as Alice Ellery
- Vinney Binns as Slavey

== Reception ==
"In such films as A Man's World (1918) [Emily Stevens] played the same strong modern woman character that she had created on the stage", wrote Roy Liebman.
