= As Man Made Her =

1917 film by George Archainbaud

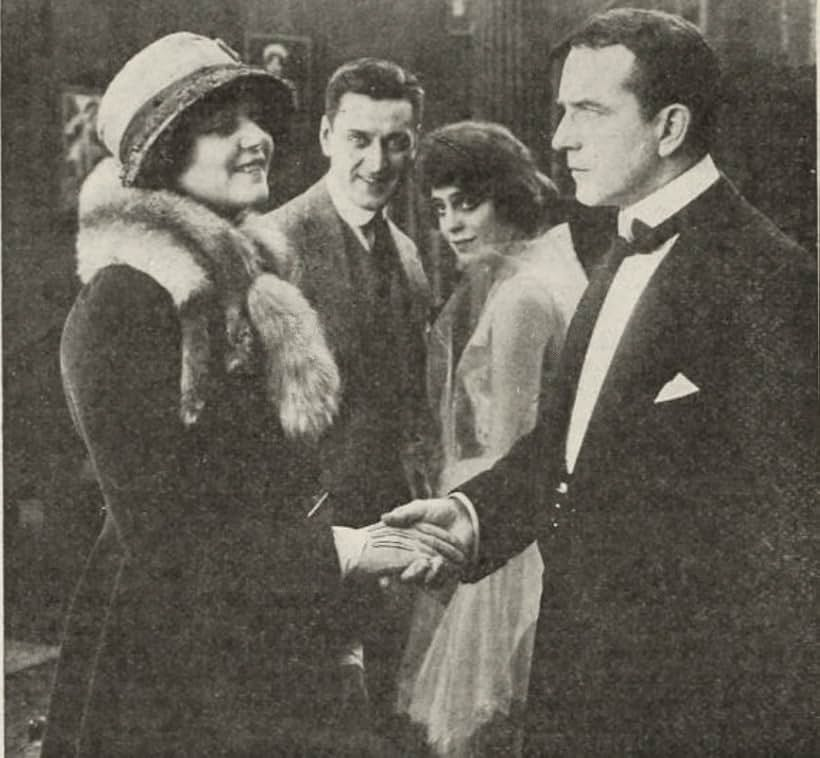
- Film still
- Directed by: George Archainbaud
- Written by: Helen Beare; Frances Marion
- Produced by: William A. Brady
- Starring: Gail Kane; Frank Mills; Gerda Holmes
- Cinematography: Philip Hatkin
- Production company: Peerless Productions
- Distributed by: World Film
- Release date: March 26, 1917
- Running time: 5 reels
- Country: United States
- Languages: Silent; English intertitles

As Man Made Her is a lost 1917 American silent drama film directed by George Archainbaud and starring Gail Kane, Frank Mills and Gerda Holmes.

== Cast ==
- Gail Kane as Claire Wilson
- Frank Mills as Mason Forbes
- Gerda Holmes as Grace Hughes
- Edward Langford as Harold Forbes
- Miss Layton as Claire's Maid
- Miss McDonald as Nurse

== Preservation ==
With no holdings located in archives, As Man Made Her is considered a lost film.

== Bibliography ==
- Langman, Larry. American Film Cycles: The Silent Era. Greenwood Publishing, 1998.
