= Social Quicksands =

1918 silent film directed by Charles Brabin

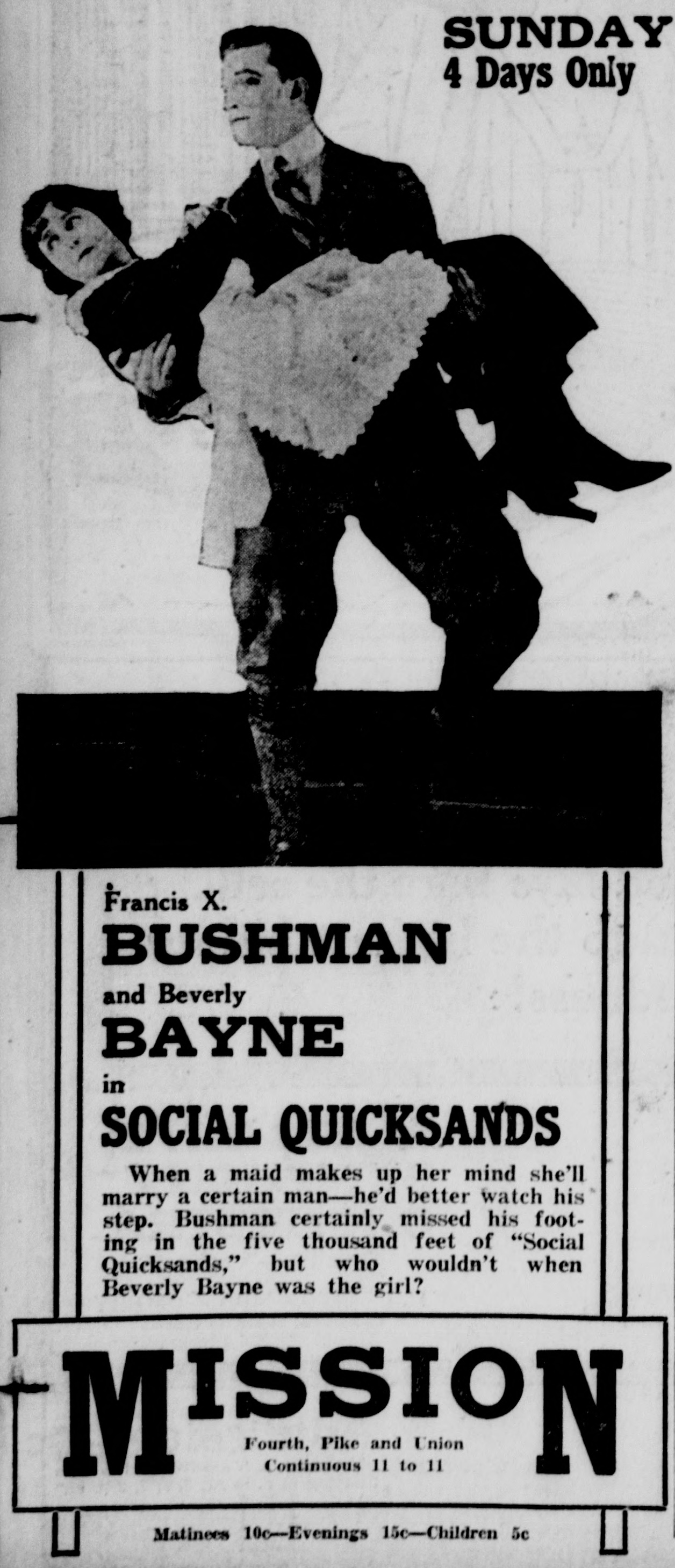
- Contemporary advertisement
- Directed by: Charles Brabin
- Screenplay by: Katharine Kavanaugh; June Mathis
- Story by: Katharine Kavanaugh
- Produced by: Maxwell Karger
- Starring: Francis X. Bushman; Beverly Bayne; Mabel Frenyear
- Cinematography: Rudolph J. Bergquist
- Production company: Metro Pictures
- Release date: June 10, 1918 (US)
- Running time: 5 reels
- Country: United States
- Language: English

Social Quicksands is a 1918 American silent comedy-drama film, directed by Charles Brabin. It stars Francis X. Bushman, Beverly Bayne, and Mabel Frenyear, and was released on June 10, 1918.

== Cast list ==
- Francis X. Bushman as Warren Dexter
- Beverly Bayne as Phyllis Lane
- Mabel Frenyear as Mollie
- Leslie Stowe as Dudley
- William Dunn as Jim
- Lila Blow as Mrs. Byrd Cutting
- Rolinda Bainbridge as Mrs. Amos
- Elsie MacLeod as Miss "Nobody Home"
- Jack B. Hollis as Englishman
- Armorel McDowell as The "Bullet Girl"
- William Stone
- Jack Dunn
