= Fedora (1918 film) =

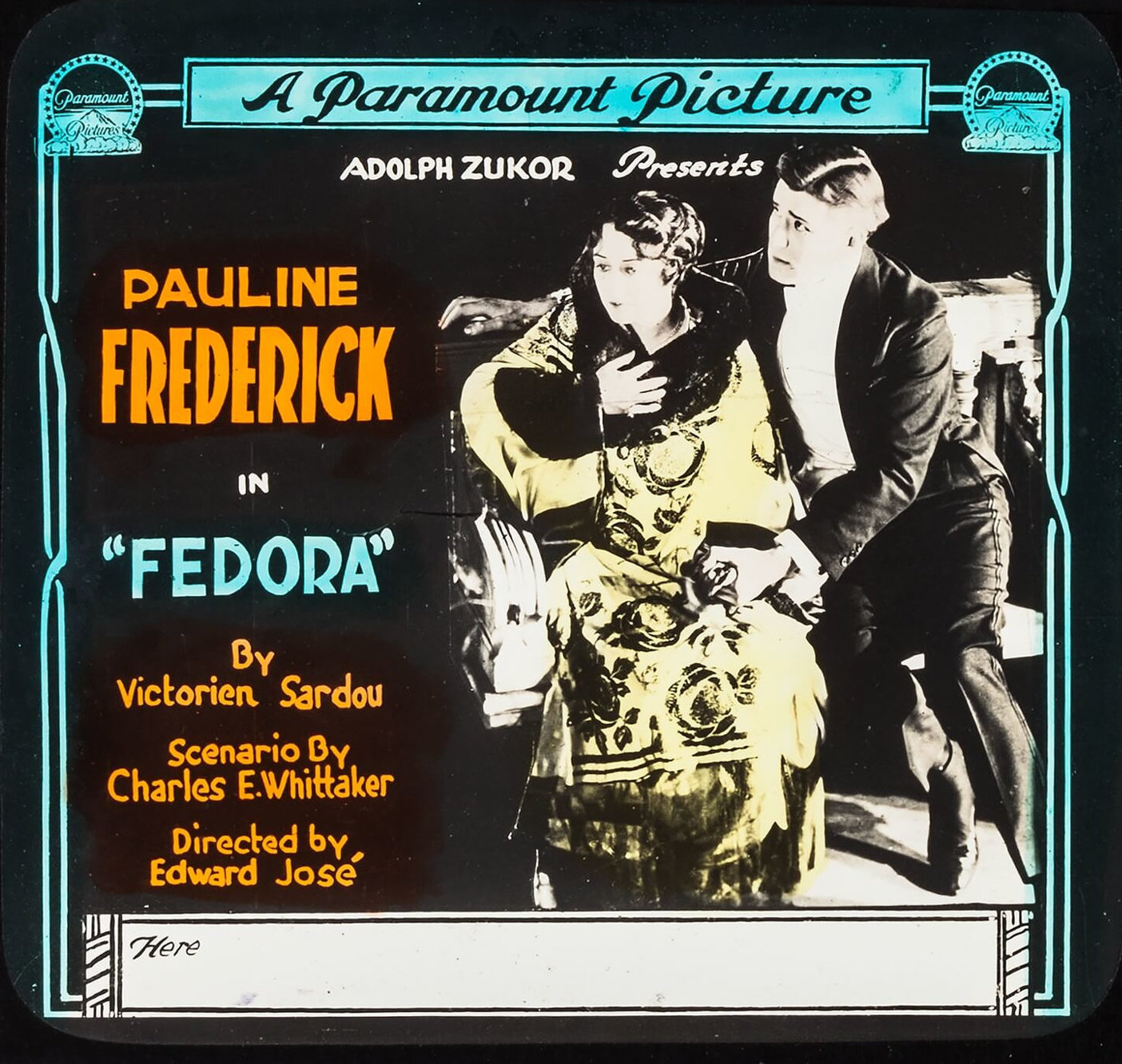
- Lantern slide for the film
- Directed by: Edward José
- Screenplay by: Charles E. Whittaker
- Based on: Fédora by Victorien Sardou
- Produced by: Adolph Zukor
- Starring: Pauline Frederick; Alfred Hickman
- Cinematography: Ned Van Buren; Hal Young
- Production company: Famous Players–Lasky Corporation
- Distributed by: Paramount Pictures
- Release date: August 4, 1918
- Running time: 50 minutes
- Country: United States
- Language: Silent (English intertitles)

Fedora is a 1918 American silent drama film directed by Edward José. The film stars Pauline Frederick, Alfred Hickman, Jere Austin, William L. Abingdon, and John Merkyl (as Wilmuth Merkyl). The film was released on August 4, 1918, by Paramount Pictures.

Fedora was adapted for the screen by Charles E. Whittaker, based on the 1882 play with the same name by Victorien Sardou. The play was also the source material for film adaptations produced in 1915, titled Princess Romanoff, and in 1928.

== Plot ==
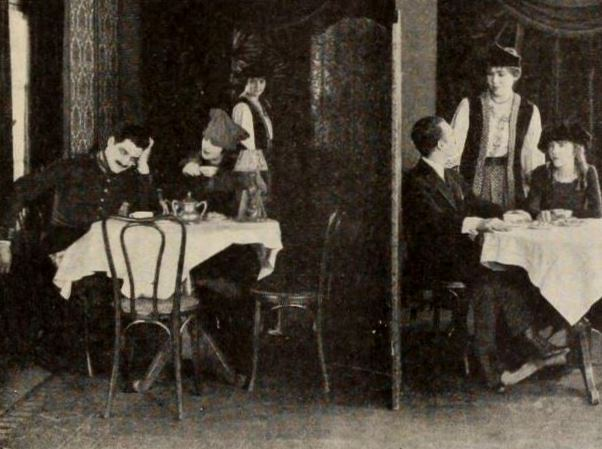
Scene from the film printed in Exhibitors Herald, August 17, 1918

As described in a film magazine, Fedora, a Russian princess of wealth and beauty and engaged to Count Vladimir Androvitch, vows to bring the murderer of the Count to justice after he is mysteriously slain. She traces the assassin to Paris and poses as a Russian exile. By the practice of her wiles she induces Louis Ipanoff to fall in love with and wrings a confession from him. Ipanoff goes to Fedora's house and reveals the truth of her fiancé's death, he having discovered Vladimir in Mme. Ipanoff's bedroom. When Fedora learns of her late fiancé's perfidy, she declares her love for Ipanoff and screens him from the police until the Tsar can pardon him and they are finally married.

== Cast ==
- Pauline Frederick as Princess Fedora
- Alfred Hickman as Gretch
- Jere Austin as Louis Ipanoff
- William L. Abingdon as Gen. Zariskene
- John Merkyl as Count Vladimir Androvitch (credited as Wilmuth Merkyl)

== Preservation ==
Fedora is currently presumed lost. In February of 2021, the film was cited by the National Film Preservation Board on their Lost U.S. Silent Feature Films list.
