= Daybreak (1918 film) =

1918 film

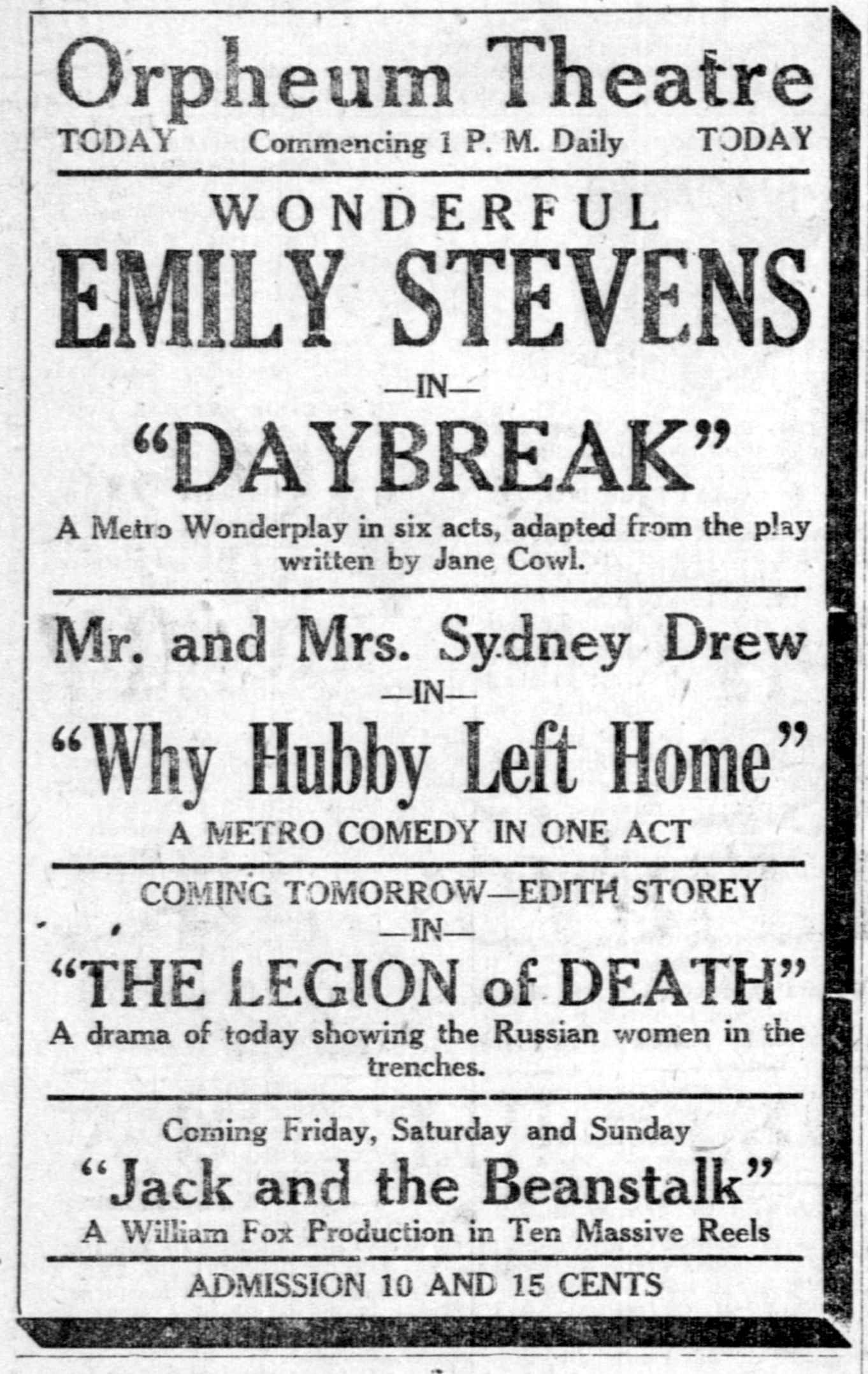
- A newspaper advertisement for this film and several others.
- Directed by: Albert Capellani
- Written by: Albert Capellani (adaptation); June Mathis (adaptation); Jane Cowl (play); Jane Murfin (play)
- Starring: Emily Stevens
- Cinematography: David Calcagni
- Distributed by: Metro Pictures
- Release date: January 7, 1918
- Running time: Five reels
- Country: United States
- Language: Silent (English intertitles)

Daybreak is a 1918 American silent drama film directed by Albert Capellani. The film is considered to be lost.

== Plot ==
As described in a film magazine, Edith Frome (Stevens) finds it impossible to live with her husband Arthur (L'Estrange), who overindulges in liquor, and finally leaves him. After a separation of three years, she returns. Each evening she goes out and returns late, which arouses the suspicion of her husband. He has his secretary follow her and learns that she visits a child. Because of her friendliness with Dr. David Brett (Phillips), Arthur suspects the worst and institutes divorce proceedings. Edith tells him the truth concerning the child and Arthur, realizing his folly with his debauches, swears off liquor and they are reunited.

== Cast ==
- Emily Stevens as Edith Frome
- Julian L'Estrange as Arthur Frome
- Herman Lieb as Herbert Rankin
- Augustus Phillips as Dr. David Brett
- Francis Joyner as Carl Peterson (credited as Frank Joyner)
- Evelyn Brent as Det. Alma Peterson
- Joseph Daly as Otway (credited as Joe Daly)
- Evelyn Axzell as Meta Thompson (credited as Mrs. Evelyn Axzell)

== Reception ==
Like many American films of the time, Daybreak was subject to cuts by city and state film censorship boards. For example, the Chicago Board of Censors cut two intertitles, "Now I know the truth — you have a child and Dr. Brett is the —" and "Yes and I know who's the father", and a shooting scene.
