= The Sundowner (1911 film) =

- Border Watch 14 October 1911
- Directed by: E.J. Cole
- Starring: Vera Remee; Frank R. Mills; Bohemian Dramatic Company
- Production company: Pathé Frères
- Release date: 19 August 1911
- Running time: 2,000 feet
- Country: Australia
- Languages: Silent film English intertitles

The Sundowner is an Australian film shot in Victoria. Set in the Australian bush, it was billed as "a romance with many startling adventures".

It is not known who directed the movie, but it may have been E. I. Cole as it featured his Bohemian Dramatic Company.

It is considered a lost film.

It is not the be confused with the Australian stage play The Sundowner (play).

== Plot ==
A farmer refuses to let his daughter marry her admirer until he can show he can take care of her. The admirer turns out to be a villain. The girl marries a neighbouring squatter and they have a baby. The scorned admirer returns after a few years seeking revenge. He kidnaps the baby and there is a chase.

The Goulbourn Post said "it is alleged that the picture gives a faithful illustration of the wanderings of that typical colonial character called the Sundowner, but it developed into one of the many chase pictures peculiar to cinematography, and left a lot to be desired in the nomad's life."

== Cast ==
- Vera Remee
- Frank R. Mills
- Bohemian Dramatic Company

== Production ==
The film was shot in Victoria. One newspaper said it "was photographed out west in the Never Never country."

== Reception ==
According to contemporary reports, the film was well received by audiences in a number of states.

The Launceston Daily Telegraph said the film was "cleverly acted with the scenes cleanly depicted."

The Brisbane Telegraph said it "Is a very acceptable addition to the all too small numbor of national stories which we possess."

Another report said:

The Sundowner is a capital story of unbounded interest and excitement. The life in the Never, Never country, with its awesome loneliness and characteristic beauty, is defined throughout the lengthy picture with such incredible exactness that with small imagination the spectator is carried direct to the spot. "The Sundowner", being one of Pathe Freres' first efforts in dramatic photography in our country, particular care has been paid in making it a pronounced success. Localities were explored and carefully considered, the site of operations being ultimately found out in the far west. A company of the first rank of colonial actors was selected to assume the many characters involved, and a staff of skilled photographic operators was deputed to carefully absorb this delightful dramatic story into photographic form for presentation to the many to whom this class of picture appeals
