= Grace Valentine =

American actress (1884–1964)

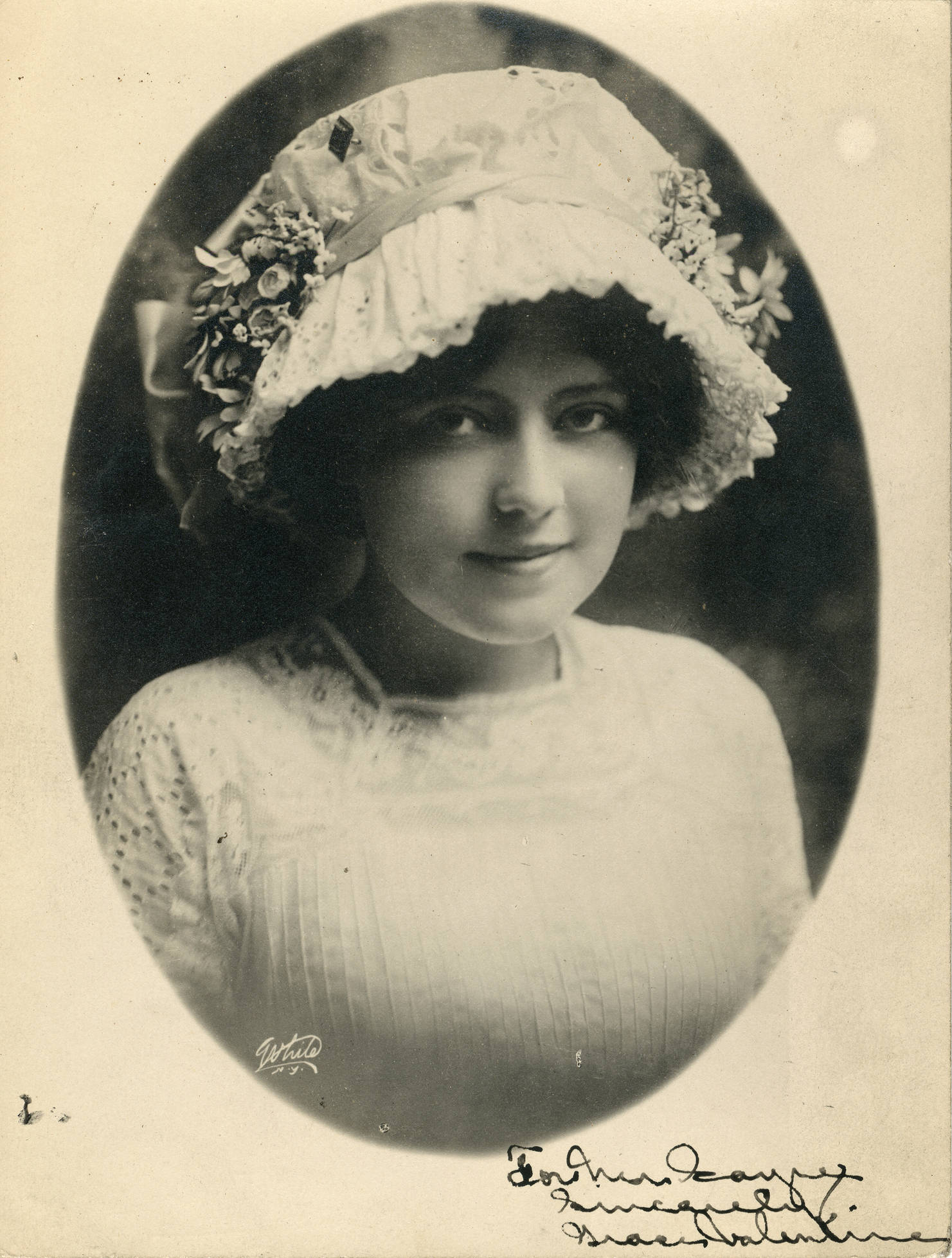
- Valentine in 1911
- Born: February 14, 1884; Springfield, Ohio, US
- Died: November 12, 1964 (aged 80); New York City, US

Grace Valentine (February 14, 1884 – November 12, 1964) was an American stage and film actress.

== Early years ==
Valentine was born in Springfield, Ohio, on February 14, 1884. She was the daughter of Jacob H. Snow and Marilla Caroline Valentine. Her father was a patent attorney and investor. She had a brother named Selak Spencer Valentine.

== Career ==
She began her career in the theater in 1905 and toured in stock companies for the next several years. She began her film career in 1915, but never ventured too far away from the legitimate stage.

Valentine's Broadway debut came in The Yellow Jacket (1915). Her final Broadway appearance was in Anna Christie (1952).

In 1929, she appeared in her first talkie and had sporadic parts in films for the next three years whereupon which she returned to the theatre.

Valentine portrayed Minnie Grady, the title character's landlady, on the radio series Stella Dallas. She also was heard on Lone Journey on radio. In 1949, she made her first television appearance on Chevrolet Tele-Theater. On August 1, 1950, Valentine appeared on television in "The Big Day", an episode of Armstrong Circle Theatre.

== Personal life and death ==
Valentine was married and divorced three times. At 15 years old, she married a 45 year old dentist to help back her career. At one point, she was married to Wayne Nunn.

She died on November 12, 1964 at Shelton Towers, now known as 525 Lexington Avenue, in New York City. She left behind no children.

== Filmography ==
- The New Adam and Eve (1915) short film
- Black Fear (1915)
- Man and His Soul (1916)
- The Blindness of Love (1916)
- The Evil Thereof (1916)
- Dorian's Divorce (1916)
- The Scarlet Runner (1916)
- The Brand of Cowardice (1916)
- Babbling Tongues (1917) extant at Library of Congress
- The Unchastened Woman (1918) remade in 1925 with Theda Bara
- A Man's Home (1921)
- Ain't It the Truth (1929) short film; extant at Library of Congress
- The Phantom in the House (1929) extant at Internet Archive
- The Silver Lining (1932)
- Her Secret (1933)
- "The Door", episode of TV series Chevrolet Tele-Theater (1949)
- "The Seeker and the Sought", episode of TV series Suspense (1949)
- "The Doctor's Wife", episode of TV series Lux Video Theatre (1951)
- "The Gomez Case", episode of TV series Janet Dean, Registered Nurse (1954)
