= A Sleeping Memory =

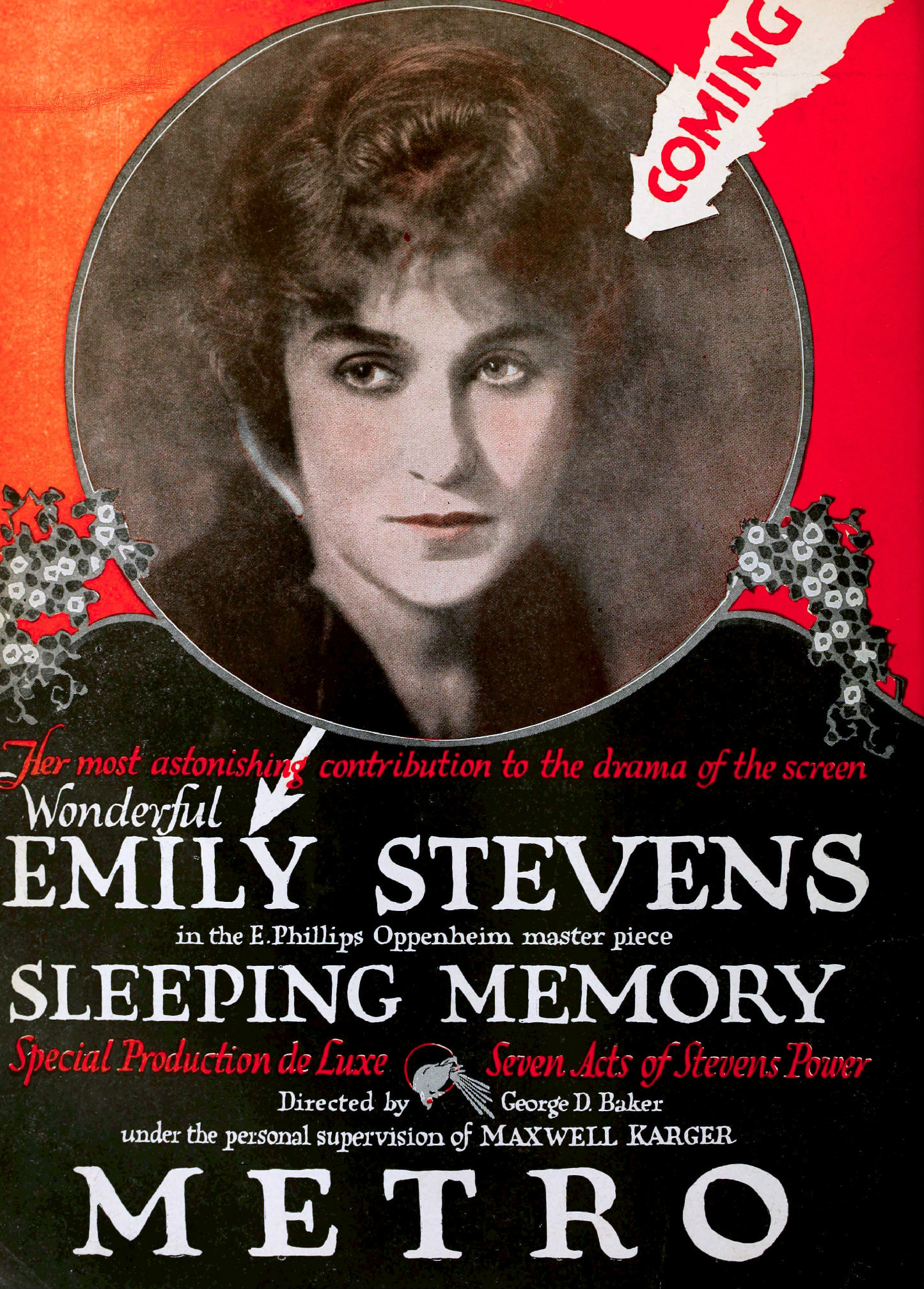
- Ad for film
- Directed by: George D. Baker; Charles Hunt (*as Charles J. Hundt)
- Written by: Albert S. Le Vino
- Based on: A Sleeping Memory by E. Phillips Oppenheim
- Produced by: Maxwell Karger (supervisor)
- Starring: Emily Stevens
- Cinematography: Ray Smallwood
- Production company: Metro Pictures
- Distributed by: Metro Pictures
- Release date: October 15, 1917
- Running time: 7 reels
- Country: USA
- Language: Silent..English titles

A Sleeping Memory is a surviving 1917 silent film drama directed by George D. Baker and starring Emily Stevens. It was produced and distributed by Metro Pictures and is based on the 1902 novel of the same name by E. Phillips Oppenheim.

== Cast ==
- Emily Stevens - Eleanore Styles Marston
- Frank R. Mills - Powers Fiske (*this Frank Mills, stage actor born 1870 died 1921)
- Mario Majeroni - Dr. Stephen Trow
- Walter Horton - Henry Johnson
- Richard Thornton - Chadwick
- Francis Joyner - Angus Hood (*as Frank Joyner)
- Kate Blancke - Mrs. Fiske

== Preservation status ==
- A print was preserved and donated by MGM to George Eastman Museum.
