= The Burden of Proof (1918 film) =

1918 film by John G. Adolfi

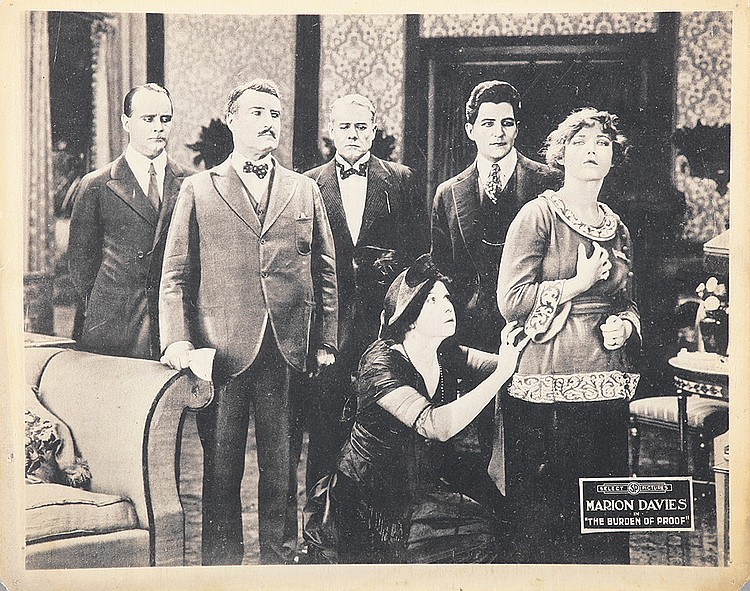
- Directed by: John G. Adolfi; Julius Steger
- Written by: Victorien Sardou (play); S.M. Weller
- Starring: Marion Davies; Mary Richards; Eloise Clement
- Cinematography: André Barlatier
- Production company: Marion Davies Film Corporation
- Distributed by: Select Pictures
- Release date: September 21, 1918
- Running time: 50 minutes
- Country: United States
- Languages: Silent; English intertitles

The Burden of Proof is a 1918 American silent drama film directed by John G. Adolfi and Julius Steger and starring Marion Davies, Mary Richards and Eloise Clement.

== Cast ==
- Marion Davies as Elaine Brooks
- Mary Richards as Mrs. Brooks, her mother
- Eloise Clement as Mrs. Durand
- John Merkyl as Robert Ames
- L. Rogers Lytton as George Blair
- Willard Cooley as Frank Raymond
- Fred Hearn as William Kemp
- Fred Lenox as Butler
- Maude Lowe as Maid

== Bibliography ==
- Wesley Alan Britton. Onscreen and Undercover: The Ultimate Book of Movie Espionage. Greenwood, 2006.
