= Wilmuth Merkyl =

American actor

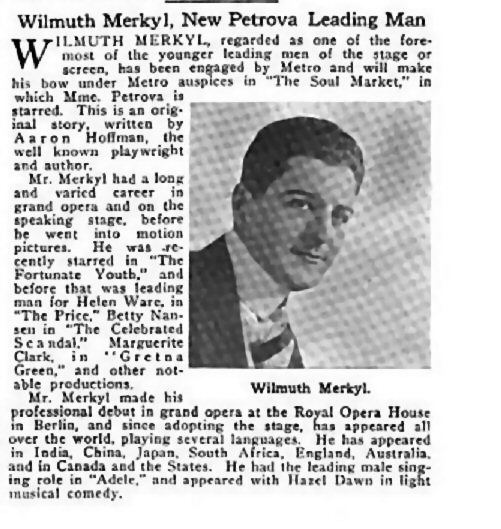
- from The Moving Picture World (1916)
- Born: Wilmuth John Merkyl; June 2, 1885; Iowa, United States
- Died: May 1, 1954 (aged 68); Los Angeles, California, U.S.
- Other name: John Merkyl
- Occupation: Actor
- Years active: 1913–1954

Wilmuth John Merkyl (June 2, 1885 – May 1, 1954) was an American stage and screen actor popular in early silent films. On stage he had also been a singer in light operettas. He was born in Iowa and died in California.

== Selected filmography ==
- Gretna Green (1915)
- The Celebrated Scandal (1915)
- Niobe (1915)
- The Price (1915)
- Let's Get a Divorce (1918)
- A Man's World (1918)(*as John Merkyl)
- Fedora (1918)
- The Burden of Proof (1918)
- Suspicion (1918)
- The Whispered Name (1924)
- The Breaking Point (1924)
- Captain January (1924)
- The Unholy Three (1925)(*uncredited)
- The Merry Widow (1934)
- Atlantic Adventure (1935)
- The Buccaneer (1938)(*uncredited)
- Andy Hardy Meets Debutante (1940) (*uncredited)
- Reap the Wild Wind (1942)(*uncredited)
- They All Kissed the Bride (1942)(*uncredited)
- The Pride of the Yankees (1942) (*uncredited)
- Gentleman Jim (1942)(*uncredited)
- The Pearl of Death (1944) (*uncredited)
- Nob Hill (1945)(*uncredited)
