= The Evil Thereof (1916 film) =

1916 film by Robert G. Vignola

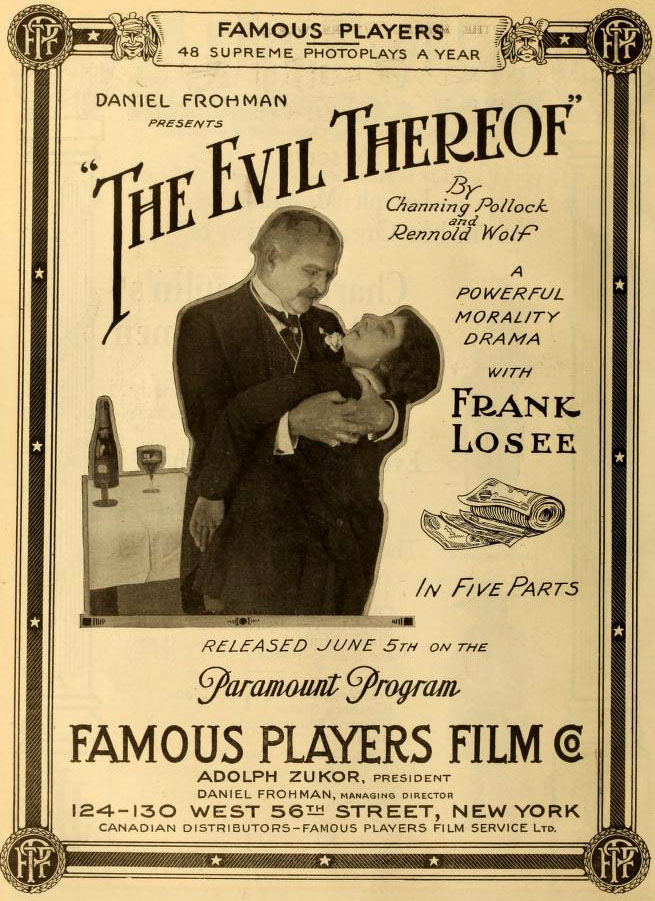
- Advertisement
- Directed by: Robert G. Vignola
- Written by: Channing Pollock; Rennold Wolf (scenario)
- Produced by: Daniel Frohman; Adolph Zukor; Jesse L. Lasky
- Starring: Frank Losee; Grace Valentine
- Production company: Famous Players–Lasky
- Distributed by: Paramount Pictures
- Release date: June 5, 1916
- Running time: 50 minutes (5 reels)
- Country: United States
- Language: Silent (English intertitles)

The Evil Thereof is a 1916 American silent drama film directed by Robert G. Vignola and starring Frank Losee and Grace Valentine.

== Plot ==
A wealthy, amoral broker seduces a manicurist and makes her his mistress, taking her away from her fiancé, a young barber.

The manicurist soon comes to detest the broker, but she has no choice except to stay with him, as respectable society considers her a "fallen woman." Then, at a dinner party, the broker, in full detail, tells his assembled guests the story of how he brought the manicurist up from nothing and gave her everything she had. Now completely humiliated and thinking only of how she has ruined her life, the manicurist takes her dinner knife and stabs the broker to death.

== Cast ==
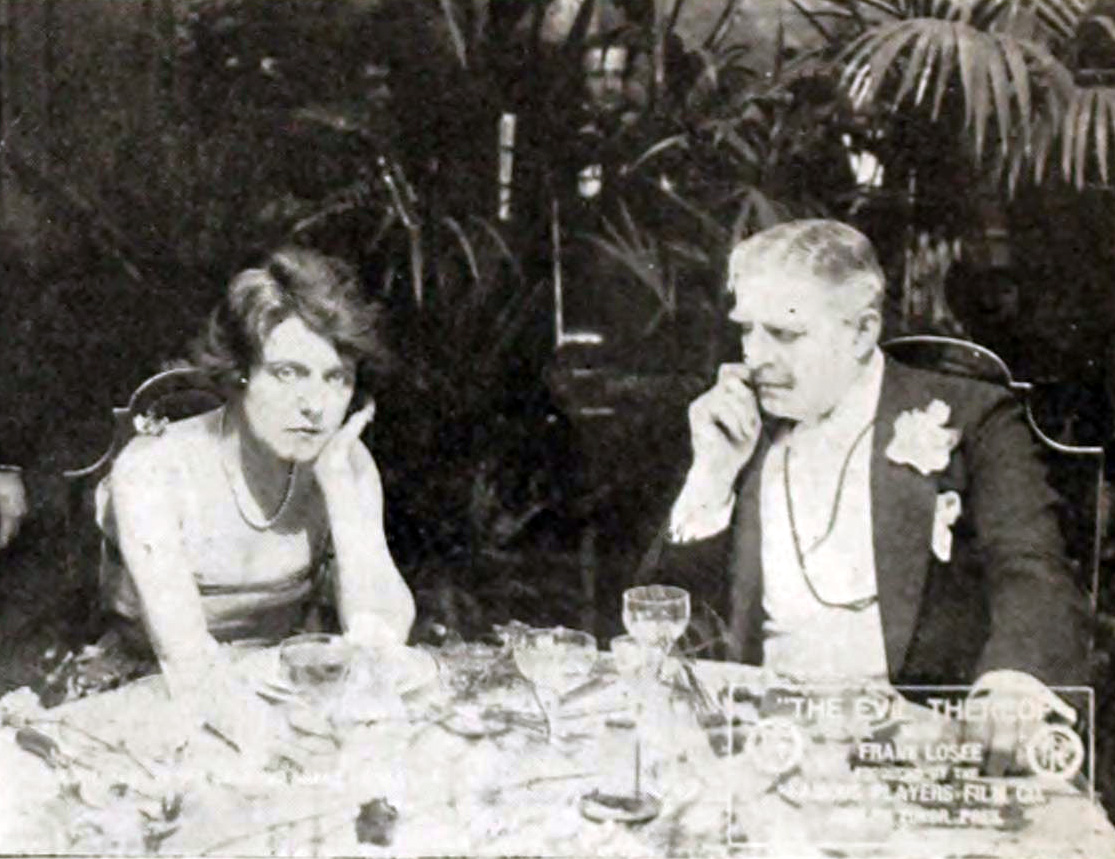
Grace Valentine and Frank Losee in The Evil Thereof featured in the June 1916 issue of Moving Picture World

- Frank Losee as the broker
- Grace Valentine as the manicurist
- Crauford Kent as the barber
- Henry Hallam as her father
- George Le Guere as the boy
