= Gretna Green (film) =

1915 film by Thomas N. Heffron

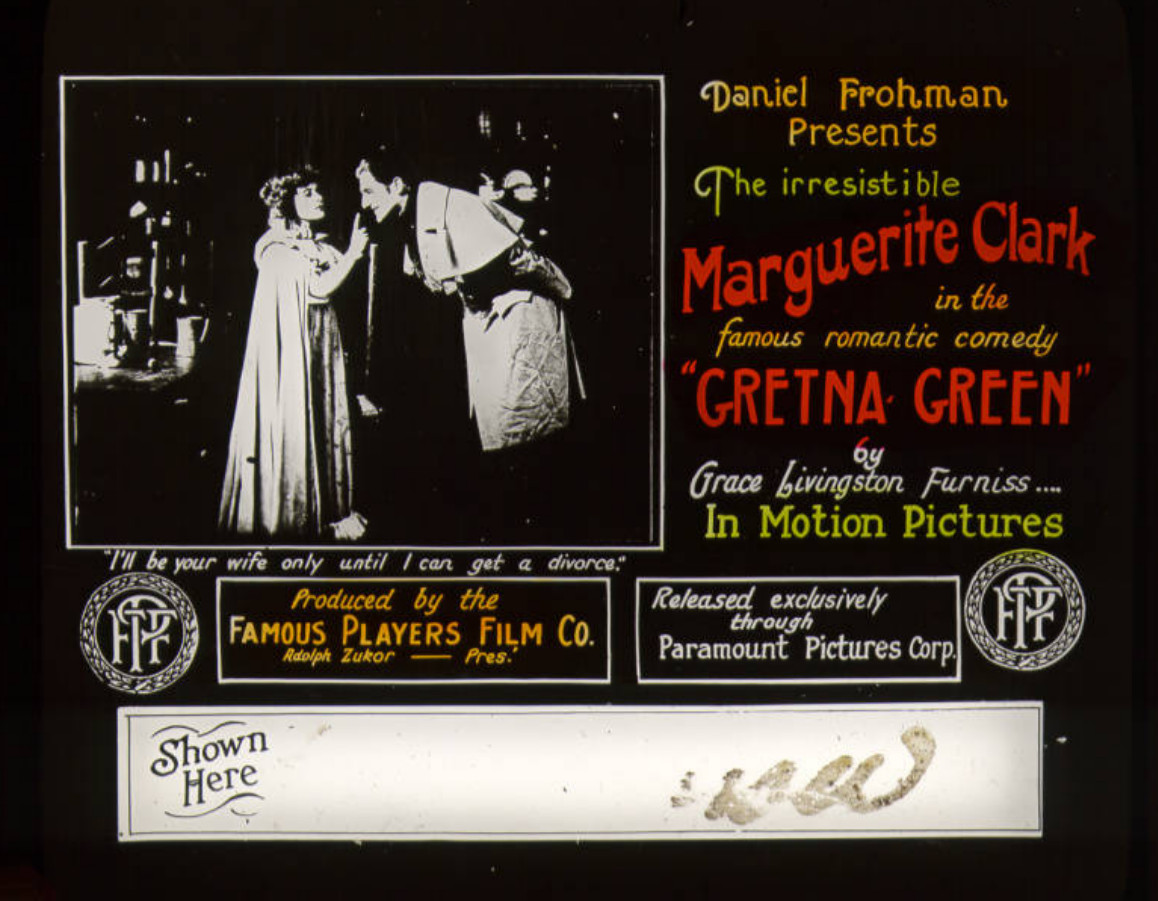
- Lantern slide
- Directed by: Thomas N. Heffron
- Written by: Thomas Heffron (scenario)
- Based on: Gretna Green by Grace Livingston Furniss
- Starring: Marguerite Clark; Arthur Hoops; Wilmuth Merkyl
- Production company: Famous Players Film Company
- Distributed by: Paramount Pictures
- Release date: March 15, 1915
- Running time: 40 minutes
- Country: United States
- Language: Silent (English intertitles)

Gretna Green is a 1915 American silent romantic comedy film directed by Thomas N. Heffron and distributed through Paramount Pictures. It is based on the Broadway play by Grace Livingston Furniss and stars Marguerite Clark. The film is now presumed lost.

The film and the play are based on the fame of the Scottish town Gretna Green. The town has become a popular destination for couples who want to legally marry as people under the age of 16 can do so without their parents' consent (under Scottish law).

== Cast ==
- Marguerite Clark as Dolly Erskine
- Arthur Hoops as Sir William Chetwynde
- Helen Lutrell as Lady Chetwynde
- Lyster Chambers as Lord Trevor
- Wilmuth Merkyl as Earl of Basset
- George Stilwell as Captain Cardiff
- J. Albert Hall as Colonel Hooker
- Martin Reagan as Innkeeper
- Julia Walcott as Innkeeper's Wife
