= A Successful Adventure =

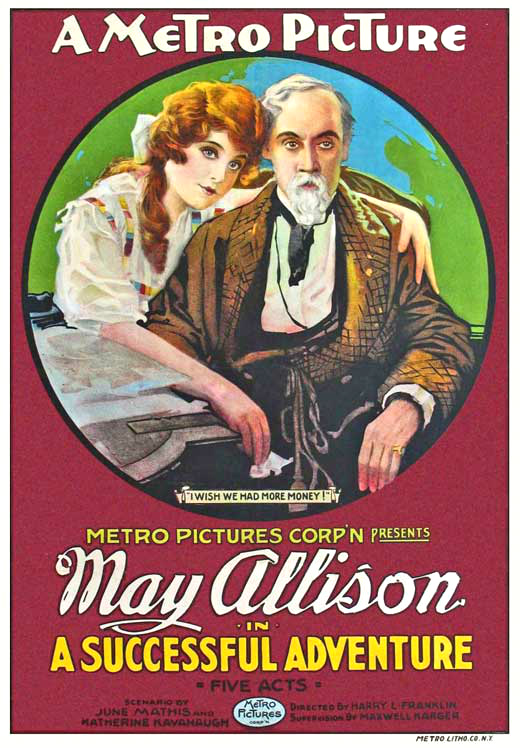
- period lobby poster
- Directed by: Harry L. Franklin
- Written by: June Mathis; Katharine Kavanaugh
- Based on: story by June Mathis
- Produced by: Maxwell Karger
- Cinematography: Arthur Martinelli; Michael Whelan
- Distributed by: Metro Pictures
- Release date: July 15, 1918
- Running time: 5 reels
- Country: USA
- Language: Silent..English titles

A Successful Adventure is a lost 1918 silent film romantic comedy starring May Allison and Harry Hilliard. It was produced by Maxwell Karger and released through Metro Pictures.

An alternative title was The Way to a Man's Heart.

== Cast ==
- May Allison as Virginia Houston
- Harry Hilliard as Perry Arnold
- Frank Currier as Lionel Houston
- Edward Connelly as Daniel Houston
- Christine Mayo as Rose Mason
- Fred C. Jones as Henry Du Bois
- Kate Blancke as Aunt Louise
- Pauline Dempsey as Aunt Judy
- Anthony Byrd as Uncle Joshua
- Phoebe Starr
- Maurice Steuart
- Howard Oppenheim
- Lionel Houston
- Dion Muse
