= Kate Kavanagh =

Kate Kavanagh may refer to:

- Kate Kavanagh, fictional character in Fifty Shades (novel series)
- Kate Kavanagh, fictional character in Kavanagh QC

== See also ==
- Kate Cavanagh, social worker
- Katherine Kavanaugh
