= Robert Stevens (theater director) =

American actor and stage director

Robert Allston Brown Stevens (25 January 1882 Manhattan, New York – 19 December 1963 Lauderdale-by-the-Sea, Florida) was an American theater actor, director and producer in New York City and Rochester, New York, in the first half of the twentieth century. He was the first executive director of the Rochester Community Players, one of the earliest theater professionals to manage an amateur community theater, serving there for 28 years and guiding that Little Theater through the Great Depression and World War II.

== Family and background ==
Robert Stevens was the son of Robert E. Stevens (1837–1918) and Emily "Emma" Maddern (1845–1903). His father was a theatrical manager, before the American Civil War, had joined the United States Navy, where he rose to the rank of Lieutenant. According to the New York Times, Robert E. Stevens "took out the first traveling theatrical company" from New York City. He also managed actor Lawrence Barrett for many years.

His mother, Emma, was an actress, as was his sister, Emily Stevens. He is the cousin of Mrs. Fiske, one of the greatest American actresses of the late Nineteenth and early Twentieth Centuries. Mrs. Fisk herself, while appearing in Rochester in the late 1920s in an Ibsen play, visited the Rochester Community Players Playhouse, in the company of Stevens, and again was described as his cousin in a newspaper report of the visit. According to a New York Times interview with his sister, Emily Stevens, their mother, Emma Maddern, was a sister of Mrs. Fiske's mother, Elizabeth Maddern, and also a sister of Mary Maddern, who played with Mrs. Fiske for many years. Stevens performed as an actor in a number of Mrs. Fiske's productions.

His first job after school, at age 18, was as a bank clerk, but he left to attend the American Academy of Dramatic Arts. He had performed a minor walk-on part in a Shakespeare play performed by E. H. Sothern and Julia Marlowe when he landed his first major role, as Romeo in Romeo and Juliet. He was hired by the play's director, Cecil B. DeMille to take over for an actor who departed a road company production in Sioux City, Iowa.

He appeared in the cast of The Bat, during the play's three-year run on Broadway, He directed the play and took his own company on the road to present it. He performed in numerous theatrical productions, co-starring with Margaret Anglin, Holbrook Blinn, and Lou Tellegen.

Stevens appeared with the Ben Greet Players in Shakespeare productions for three years. He also worked in the motion pictures industry, as an assistant director for actress Alla Nazimova at Metro Films (one of the predecessors of Metro-Goldwyn-Mayer).

On August 12, 1911, in Manhattan, he married Ada Read Walsh (maiden; 1881–1946). He again married, to Constance B. Stevens, in June 1951.

== Community theater director ==
In the fall of 1925, Stevens was hired, to direct the newly created Rochester Community Players (RCP), a community theater that had only started operations seven months earlier. Engaged for three weeks, he stayed 28 years, with memberships (season subscriptions for two tickets per show) grew from 300 to 5,000 by the late 1940s. He directed over 200 productions with RCP, keeping the organization solvent and operating with full programming through the financial difficulties of the Great Depression and the limitations on materials and unavailability of actors during World War II. RCP purchased its own facility, the Playhouse, at Meigs Street and Clinton Avenue in Rochester a year after he was hired in 1925.

== Retirement ==
Stevens retired from RCP at the conclusion of the final production of the 1952-53 season, Arsenic and Old Lace. He retired to Florida and died at Lauderdale-by-the Sea December 19, 1963.
