= The Wheel of the Law =

1916 film by George D. Baker

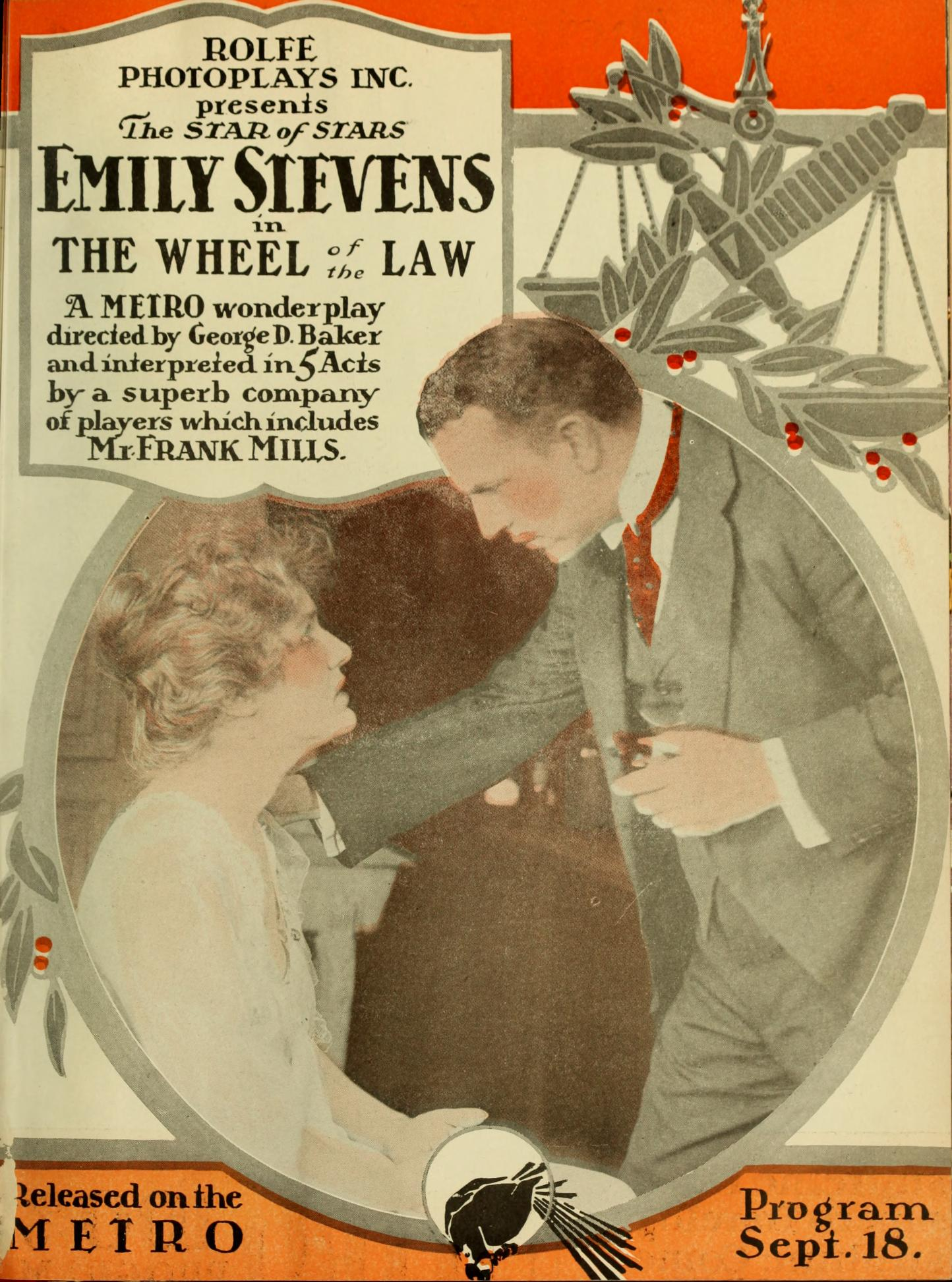
- Lobby poster
- Directed by: George D. Baker; Charles J. Hunt (ass't director)
- Written by: Katharine Kavanaugh (scenario)
- Produced by: B. A. Rolfe
- Starring: Emily Stevens
- Production company: Metro Pictures
- Distributed by: Metro Pictures
- Release date: September 18, 1916
- Running time: 5 reels
- Country: United States
- Language: Silent (English intertitles)

The Wheel of the Law is a lost 1916 American silent drama film produced and distributed by Metro Pictures and starring Emily Stevens. It was directed by George D. Baker.

== Cast ==
- Emily Stevens as Mona Mainard
- Frank R. Mills as John Norton (*this Frank Mills, actor born 1870 died 1921)
- Raymond McKee as Tommy Mainard
- Edwin Holt as 'Big' Bill Ryan
- Roma Raymond as Pearl Le Claire
- Harry Davenport as John Daniels
- Jerome N. Wilson as Jimmy McClane
- Charles Eldridge as Frank Wills
- Kalman Matus (unidentified role)
- Thomas McGrath (unidentified role)
