= Lawrence Barrett =

American stage actor (1838–1891)

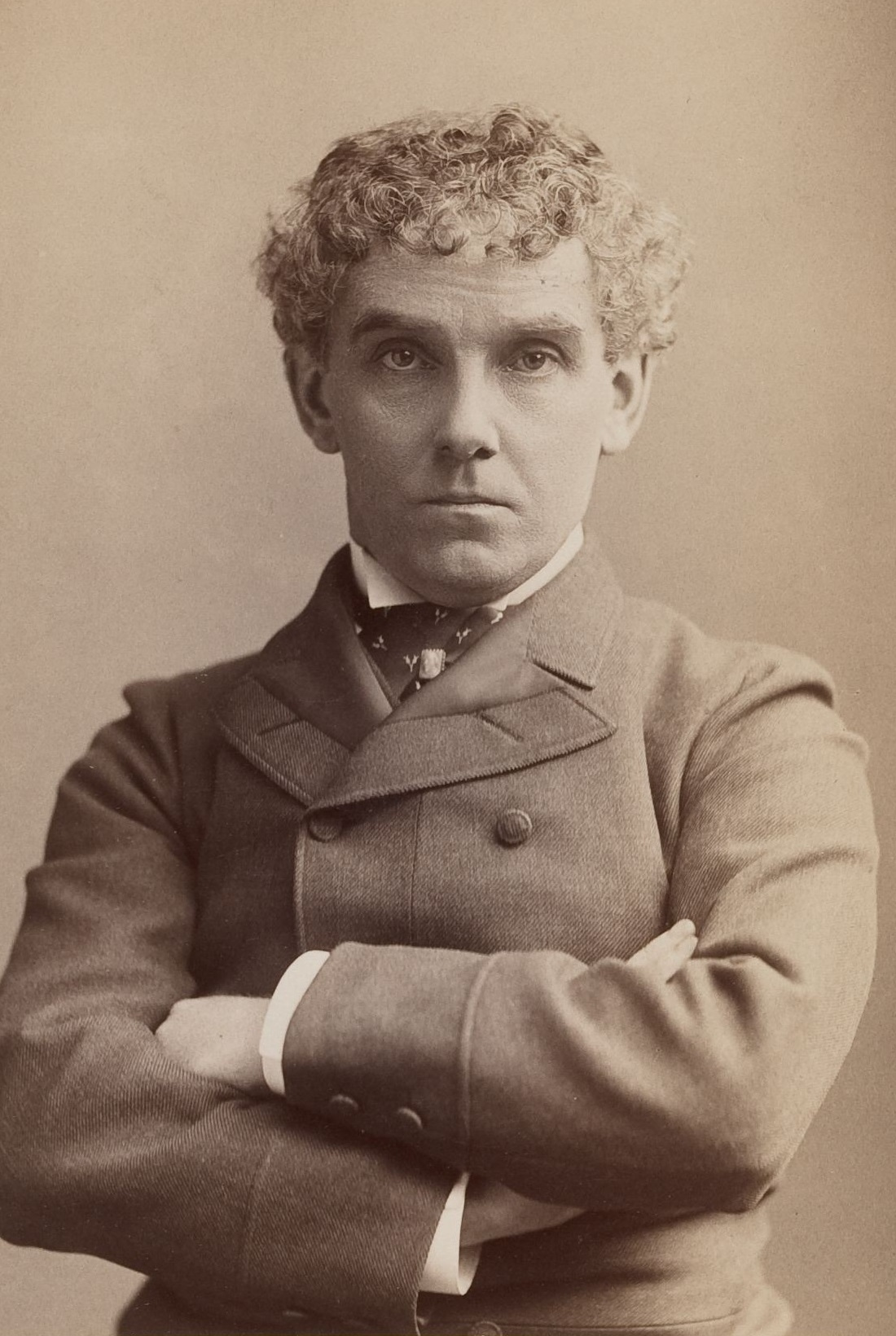
- Born: April 4, 1838; Paterson, New Jersey, U.S.
- Died: March 20, 1891 (aged 52); New York City, U.S.
- Occupation: Stage actor
- Spouse: Mary F. Mayer (m. 1859)
- Relatives: Edith Barrett (granddaughter)

Lawrence Patrick Barrett (April 4, 1838 – March 20, 1891) was an American stage actor.

Barrett began his career in 1853 in Detroit and made his first New York appearance in 1856. Barrett enlisted for the American Civil War in 1862, but resigned in 1863. He later managed the California Theatre in San Francisco from 1868 to 1870 alongside John McCullough. Barrett performed a variety of roles, including Hamlet, King Lear, and Macbeth. He was especially known for his portrayal of Cardinal Richelieu in Edward Bulwer-Lytton's drama.

Barrett acted in London on multiple occasions and produced and starred in several plays. He frequently collaborated with fellow stage actor Edwin Booth, touring together and achieving immense success. Barrett's health began to decline in 1890, and he died in 1891 during a performance of Richelieu.

Barrett married Mary Frederika Mayer in 1859, and was the grandfather of actress Edith Barrett. His acting style was described as versatile and expressive, but some critics questioned his stage personations.

He was a founding member of The Players.

== Biography ==
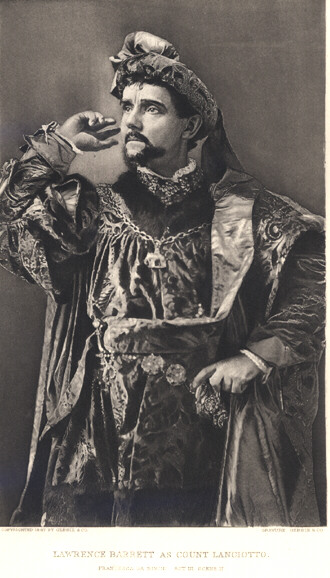
Lawrence Barrett as Count Lanciotto, 1887

A native of Paterson, New Jersey, Barrett was born in 1838 to Mary Agnes (née Read) Barrett and tailor Thomas Barrett, Irish immigrants who had settled in Paterson. He was raised in Detroit, and made his first stage appearance there in 1853 as Murad in The French Spy. In December 1856 he made his first New York appearance at the Chambers Street theatre as Sir Thomas Clifford in The Hunchback.

In 1858 he was in the repertory company at the Boston Museum. In 1862 enlisted for the American Civil War, and was appointed a captain in Company B of the 28th Regiment Massachusetts Volunteer Infantry Regiment; he served until resigning in 1863. From 1868 to 1870, with John McCullough, he managed the California Theatre, San Francisco, where he frequently toured the interior towns with McCullough and casts from the theater.

Among his many and varied parts may be mentioned Hamlet, King Lear, Macbeth, Shylock, Richard III, Wolsey, Benedick in Much Ado About Nothing, Richelieu, David Garrick, Hernani, Alfred Evelyn, Lanciotto in George Henry Boker's (1823–1890) Francesca da Rimini, and Janies Harebell in The Man o' Airlie.

Barrett acted in London in 1867, 1882, 1883 and 1884, his "Cardinal Richelieu" portrayal in Edward Bulwer-Lytton's drama being considered his best part. In 1891, he produced the first performance of Oscar Wilde's The Duchess of Padua, retitling it Guido Ferranti and taking on the title role. In 1869 Barrett partnered with actor John McCullough in the creation of San Francisco's California Theater, leaving his management position within two years, although he became a frequent actor on tour of the West throughout the 1870s and 80s. He was particularly successful in Kansas City, Missouri, where he performed for a week in December 1870 in the inaugural season of the Coates Opera House; he returned 11 times. In 1889, he produced William Young's play Ganelon, with himself in the title role. The expensive production set in the Middle Ages had a successful run. William S. Hart, who was initially hired to play one of the roles, recalled," The performances were given, and they were highly creditable too!"

He was managed for many years by Robert E. Stevens, the father of actress Emily Stevens and theater director Robert Stevens. In addition to his acting, Barrett also wrote a life of Edwin Forrest in the American Actors Series (Boston, 1881). Of the actor, Barrett said his personality was too strong to allow his characters to show through: "He was in all things marked and distinctive. His obtrusive personality often destroyed the harmony of the portrait he was painting."

Barrett frequently worked with fellow stage actor Edwin Booth; he played Othello to Booth's Iago and Cassius to his Brutus in Julius Caesar. He wrote a sketch of his colleague for Edwin Booth and his Contemporaries (Boston, 1886). Shortly after, Barrett contacted Booth and suggested that the two tour together beginning in 1887 season. They worked together for the next several years and were immensely successful, both in popularity and in financial returns. As Booth reflected on Barrett's leadership and management, he wrote: "Well, why should I not do good work, after all Barrett has done for me... Good work, eh? Well, I'll give him the best that's in me, he deserves it."

On April 3, 1889, the two were performing in Othello but Booth's voice did not work when he attempted to deliver Iago's first lines. Barrett asked the curtain to be lowered and called for doctors before telling the audience there would be no performance that night. He was reported as saying, "We fear that this is the beginning of the end. The world may have heard for the last time the voice of the greatest actor who speaks the English language." Newspapers reported that Booth was dying, though he survived the incident.

Barrett began showing serious health problems in 1890. That year, after organizing performances starring Booth and Polish actress Helena Modjeska, he traveled to a spa in Germany before rejoining them in the fall. Due to a glandular problem, however, his face was swollen and his voice was weak. Finally, in March 1891, during a performance of Richelieu at the Broadway Theatre, Barrett whispered to Booth that he could not go on. He finished the scene before being replaced by his understudy. He died three days later. A few years after his death, author Eugene Field criticized the condition of his grave in Massachusetts, writing: "The neglect with which Barrett's memory has been treated... is one of the most shameful blots upon the theatrical profession."

== Personal life ==
Barrett married Mary F. Mayer in Boston on September 4, 1859, at the Cathedral of the Holy Cross in Boston. He was the grandfather of stage and screen actress Edith Barrett, the first wife of Vincent Price.

Barrett was a longtime friend of Miss Matoaca Gay; he encouraged her studies of Shakespeare, and even gave readings at Miss Gay's study groups.

Barrett was a close friend of George Armstrong Custer and hosted him whenever the cavalry officer visited New York. According to author Stephen Ambrose, Barrett nearly talked Custer into abandoning his career in the military for one as an actor. In 1872, just four years before Custer and his entire command would be wiped out by a gathering of Plains tribes at the Battle of the Little Bighorn, Barrett accompanied Custer on a whirlwind buffalo hunt across the Great Plains. At one point the pair reportedly killed a number of the rapidly disappearing animals from the top of a moving train in Kansas.

== Acting style ==
One critic noted Barrett had "a well knit form and face capable of expressing sorrow, by the merest movement of a muscle; joy by the kindling of the eye; or rage, by the transport of the entire body". Another critic disagreed, however, writing: "Mr. Barrett is generally looked upon as being a brainy man, an earnest man, an ambitious man, and a studious man. He writes well, talks well, and manages well, but in the judgment of the metropolitan connoisseurs he does not play well. His culture and cleverness appear, they say, in everything he does except in his stage personations."

== Quotation ==
An actor is a sculptor who carves in snow.

— Auden & Kronenberger, (1966)

== Sources ==
- Auden, W.H.; Kronenberger, Louis (1966), The Viking Book of Aphorisms, New York: Viking Press.
