= Outwitted (1917 film) =

1917 silent film directed by George D. Baker

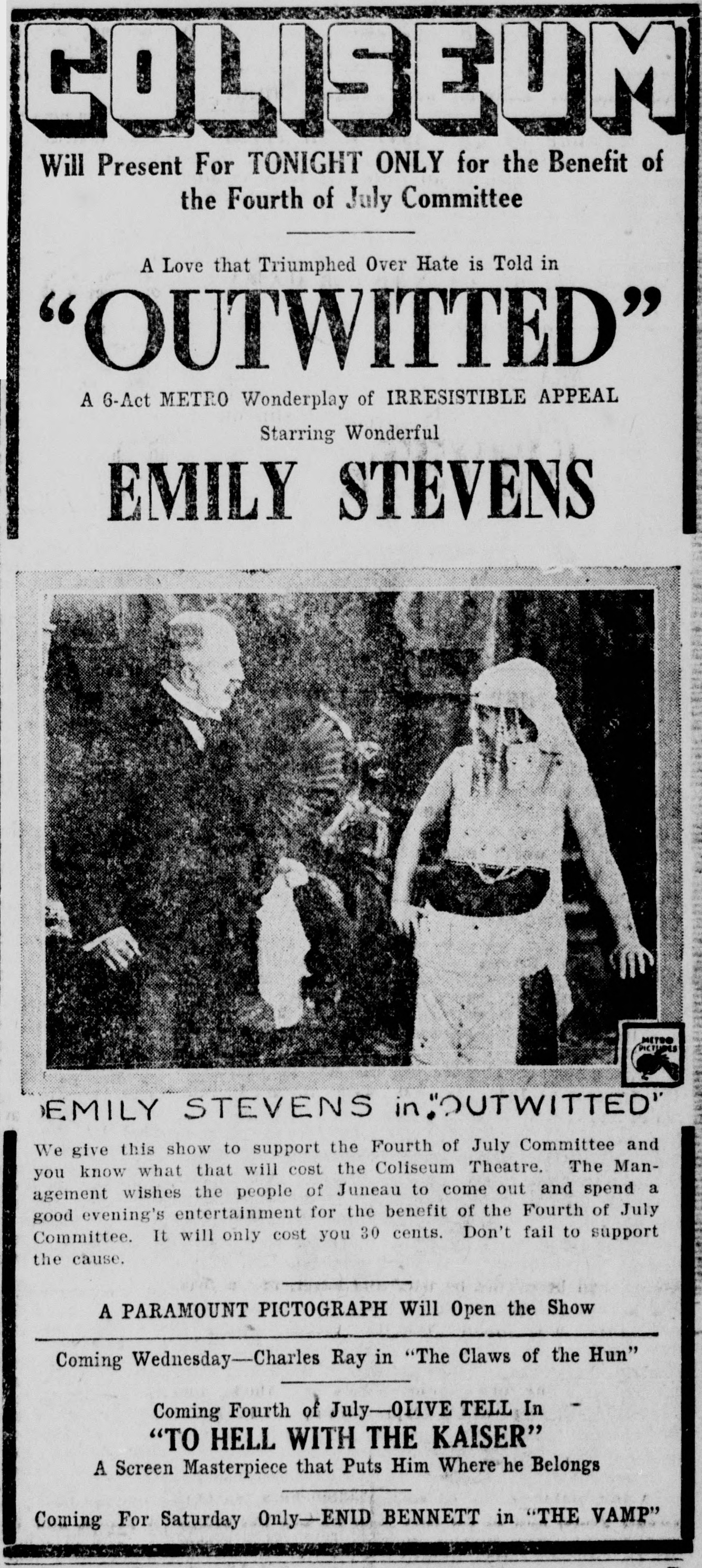
- Newspaper advertisement
- Directed by: George D. Baker
- Screenplay by: Mary Murillo (scenario)
- Story by: Charles A. Logue
- Produced by: Maxwell Karger
- Starring: Emily Stevens; Earle Foxe; Frank Currier
- Cinematography: Ray Smallwood
- Production company: Metro Pictures
- Release date: November 12, 1917 (US)
- Running time: 5 reels
- Country: United States
- Language: English

Outwitted is a 1917 American silent drama film, directed by George D. Baker. It stars Emily Stevens, Earle Foxe, and Frank Currier, and was released on November 12, 1917.

== Cast list ==
- Emily Stevens as Nan Kennedy
- Earle Foxe as Billy Bond
- Frank Currier as John Lawson
- Ricca Allen as Madame Estrelle
- Paul Everton as Ben Farraday
- Frank Joyner as Jim Kennedy
- Fred Truesdell as James Bond
- Joseph Burke as Butler
