= Louis K. Anspacher =

American poet

Louis Kaufmann Anspacher (March 1, 1878 in Cincinnati, Ohio – May 10, 1947 in Nashville, Tennessee) was an American poet, playwright and script writer.

He was the author of Challenge of the Unknown: Exploring the Psychic World, with an introduction by Waldemar Kaempffert, which was published by Allen and Unwin, in the US in 1947 by Current Books, and in Great Britain in 1952 by Henderson and Spalding.

Anspacher's poem "Ocean Ode" served as the basis of a tone poem, The Ocean, by Henry Kimball Hadley, composed between 1920 and 1921.

== Plays ==
- The Embarrassment of Riches (1906)
- A Woman of Impulse (1909)
- Our Children (1915)
- The Unchastened Woman (1915) (*filmed in 1918 and 1925)
- That Day (1922)
- Dagmar (1923)
- The Rhapsody (1930)
