= Katharine Kavanaugh =

American screenwriter and playwright

- Born: Dec. 26, 1874; Baltimore, Maryland, USA
- Died: Oct. 3, 1942 (aged 67)
- Occupation: Screenwriter
- Spouse: Oliver Ziegfeld (m. 1910)

For those of a similar name, see Katherine Kavanagh (disambiguation)

Katharine Kavanaugh (sometimes spelled Katherine Kavanaugh) was an American screenwriter and playwright active primarily during Hollywood's silent era. She was primarily known for writing comedies.

== Biography ==
=== Theatrical beginnings ===
Kavanaugh was born in Baltimore, Maryland, in 1874, and she attended school at Mount de Sales and Notre Dame. Both of her parents died when she was young. She took an early interest in storytelling; as she'd later recall, she'd often get in trouble as a young girl for working up plays in the schoolyard. Still, she never thought she'd make a career for herself in the theater.

She began acting with the Albaugh Stock Company around 1900, and Valerie Bergere eventually brought her on the road for her touring act. Soon she was a star of the local Baltimore theater scene, frequently writing and acting in her own plays and collaborating with the Ziegfeld players. Her 1903 play Peggy attracted special notice among critics.

By 1936, she estimated that she'd written 70 three-act plays, along with 30 one-act plays and vaudeville sketches.

=== Hollywood career ===
In 1917, Kavanaugh was hired to the reading and writing staff at the New York–based Metro film studio. She later recounted her delight at getting a response from Metro and having her first story, The Wheel of the Law, hit the big screen. In 1918, Kavanaugh won second place in Photoplay's scenario-writing contest for Betty Takes a Hand, which would eventually be produced. She was brought on under contract to supervise continuity before becoming the head of Metro's story department. She collaborated with June Mathis a lot in those early years.

Eventually she became homesick for the stage, and she took a sabbatical to return to Baltimore, where she opened the Katharine Kavanaugh School, which taught acting and screenwriting. She also aimed to write, direct, and produce her own motion pictures. This was not to come to fruition, however, and she ultimately returned to working with Mathis, who brought her on at First National, where the two worked together for several more years.

One of her claims to fame was helping to create the Jones Family characters, who would appear in 17 low-budget films between 1936 and 1940. The first film in the series, Every Saturday Night, was released in 1936, and Kavanaugh would also co-write Educating Father, released later that same year.

While her screenwriting career cooled in the late 1930s, she continued writing plays that were produced in the Los Angeles area until her death in 1942. She and her husband, Oliver Ziegfeld (her manager in her early days), were the founders of the Studio Village Theatre Guild.

=== Personal life ===
Kavanaugh married fellow actor Oliver C. Ziegfeld (a cousin of Broadway impresario Florenz Ziegfeld Jr.) in Baltimore 1910, but she continued writing under her maiden name. The pair had no children.

== Selected filmography ==
- Educating Father (1936)
- Every Saturday Night (1936) (story)
- The Far Cry (1926) (adaptation)
- The Day of Faith (1923) (adaptation)
- The Divorcee (1919)
- The Silent Woman (1918)
- The Liar (1918) (story)
- A Successful Adventure (1918) (scenario)
- The House of Gold (1918) (story)
- Social Quicksands (1918)
- The Winning of Beatrice (1918) (scenario)
- The Winding Trail (1918) (story)
- Betty Takes a Hand (1918) (story)
- Peggy, the Will o' the Wisp (1917) (story)
- The Wheel of the Law (1916) (scenario)

== Selected theatrical works ==
- Diamond Chip
- The Dust of the Earth
- Katrinka
- The Ragged Princess
