= Emily Stevens (actress) =

Actress

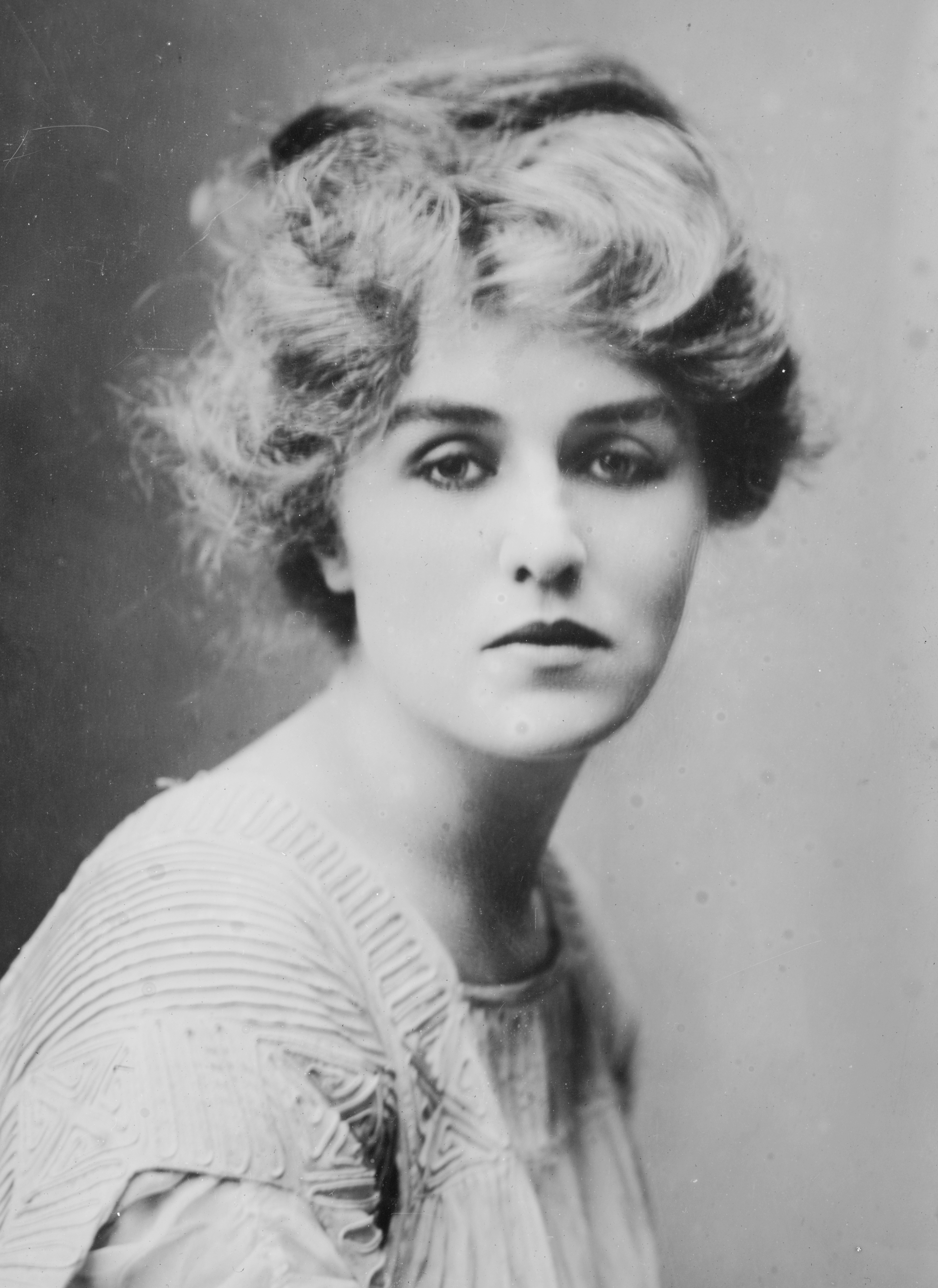
- Born: February 27, 1883; New York City, U.S.
- Died: January 2, 1928 (aged 44); New York City, U.S.
- Occupation: Actress
- Years active: 1900–1927

Emily Stevens (February 27, 1883 – January 2, 1928) was a stage and screen actress in Broadway plays in the first three decades of the 20th century and later in silent films.

== Family lineage ==
Stevens was born in New York City, the daughter of Robert E. Stevens (born c. 1837 in Philadelphia, Pennsylvania), a theatrical manager, and actress Emma Maddern Stevens. Her father had joined the United States Navy just before the American Civil War, rising to the rank of Lieutenant. According to The New York Times, Robert E. Stevens "took out the first traveling theatrical company" from New York City. He also managed actor Lawrence Barrett for many years.

She was from a theatrical family. She was a cousin of Minnie Maddern Fiske. Stevens bore a strong physical resemblance to Mrs. Fiske, which was accentuated by her style of acting. Stevens' mother, Emma Maddern, was a sister of Mrs. Fiske's mother, Elizabeth Madden, and also a sister of Mary Madden, who played with Mrs. Fiske for many years.

Stevens was educated at the Institute of the Holy Angels in Fort Lee, New Jersey and St. Mary's Hall-Doane Academy in Burlington, New Jersey.

== Theater actress ==
Stevens got her first training with Mrs. Fiske's company after she (Stevens) left St. Mary's Hall School (now Doane Academy) in Burlington, New Jersey. She made her theatrical debut as a maid in Becky Sharp in Bridgeport, Connecticut on October 8, 1900. Stevens was in the cast of Miranda of the Balcony produced by the Manhattan Theatre, Broadway and 33rd Street, New York City in September 1901. The drama was the first presentation at the venue under the management of Harrison Grey Fiske. Stevens had the part of Lady Ethel Mickleham. As Miranda Warriner, Mrs. Fiske was praised for her interpretation of the principal character. In November the company of Mrs. Fiske staged The Unwelcome Mrs. Hatch at the Manhattan Theatre. The author of the play was either Constance Cary Harrison or David Belasco. The theme of the work had to do with a woman who becomes a social outcast because of marital problems. Stevens played the role of Gladys Lorimer.

In May 1902 Mrs. Fiske put on a revival of Tess of the D'Urbervilles at the Manhattan Theatre. Stevens was among the players in a recreation of this production of Mrs. Fiske first staged in 1897. She became a permanent member of the company of Mrs. Fiske in 1904, following three seasons on stage. She acted the role of Miriam in Mary of Magdala in 1904. The Manhattan Theatre presented Becky Sharp in September 1904. Based on Vanity Fair by William Makepeace Thackery, the comedy in four acts was written by Langdon Mitchell. Mrs. Fiske and the Manhattan Company brought it before audiences with Stevens and George Arliss as cast principals. A revival of Hedda Gabler was staged in November 1904 with Mrs. Fiske in the title role and Stevens as Berta. The Henrik Ibsen work played for one week in 1903 with near capacity attendance for each performance. Leah Kleschna was written especially for Mrs. Fiske by C.M.S. McLellan (Hugh Morton). The Manhattan Theatre presented the play about the daughter of a thief in December 1904. The production marked the first original role Fiske had acted in two years. Stevens, Arliss, John B. Mason, and Marie Fedor were among the players.

In 1906, she appeared in the one-act play The Eyes of the Heart at the Manhattan Theater, a companion piece to the one-act play Dolce by John Luther Long, starring Mrs. Fiske. Stevens remained with the Fiske company for eight years. The Eyes of the World is another production she participated in with her cousin's acting troupe. She played minor roles with Arliss and Bertha Kalich before her first true New York success. This was in Septimus (1909) at the Halleck Theatre, which became Walleck's Theatre. Her achievement was followed by a performance as leading lady in The Boss for Holbrook Blinn. In 1911, she appeared as Victoria Fairchild in the farce Modern Marriage by Harrison Rhodes ("In the role of the shrewish young person who needs enlightenment, and tampering, Miss Emily Stevens plays with delightful variety in an excellent vain of humor" - The New York Times. In 1912, Stevens portrayed Myra Dimsley in The Point of View, by Jules Eckert Goodman. According to The New York Times' review, "Miss Emily Steven's performance was exceptionally brilliant and revealed the power to compose a role and to deliver it. It is gratifying, too, to discover that the actress has taken the pains to overcome mannerisms which in previous performances have marred her work. She no longer bites her lips, at every opportunity to express complexity of thought. And though she rustles overmuch in places, she has gained largely in repose. In fact, she is, on the whole, a young actress of fine gifts and beautiful power." At the end of 1912, Stevens appeared in Tornadot, by German playwright Karl Volmoeller (English version by Jethor Bethell.) Stevens depicted the character of Mary Turner in Within The Law in Chicago, Illinois, also in 1912. This was several months before Jane Cowl made the character famous with a run of the play in New York. After Within The Law Stevens' noteworthy roles included the leading female role in The Child by Elizabeth Apthorp, produced by Harrison Grey Fiske, in 1913; To-Day by George Howells Broadhurst; the leading role in The Garden of Paradise by Edward Sheldon; The Unchastened Woman (1915–1916); the title character of Alan Dale's Madonna of the Future; and the title role in Hedda Gabler (1926).

She received very positive reviews for her acting as the title character in The Fugitive (1916) by John Galsworthy. After the Galsworthy tragedy of the hunted woman was performed in London, England, there had been speculation regarding an American actress playing the same role. The Times wrote that last night's performance only deepened a conviction that the first choice could be Emily Stevens. She plays with a power, a penetration, and an unerring precision that are an unfailing delight. Her performance is one of the finest achievements of the season. She scored a marked success in March 1924 with Fata Morgana, a Theatre Guild production, presented at the Garrick Theatre. Stevens' final role was that of the widow in a Theatre Guild production of The Second Man. She succeeded Lynn Fontanne in this part in July 1927. Stevens played the character until the production closed in October.

== Relationships ==
At some point early in her acting career, Stevens developed a girlhood crush on Harrison Fiske, the husband of her cousin Minnie Fiske. She seems to never have pursued a relationship with him but enough coworkers and family knew of her feeling for Fiske as it is presented in a biography on Minnie Fiske by Archie Binns. She did not pursue relationships with other men.

== Death ==
Emily Stevens died in her apartment at 50 West 67th Street, New York City, in 1928. She was 45, unmarried, and childless. She was survived by a brother, Robert Stevens, the first managing director of the Rochester Community Players in Rochester, New York. Stevens was to have begun rehearsals for a revival of Diplomacy by Victorien Sardou in the near future. George C. Tyler was the play's producer. Stevens died the same day as Dorothy Donnelly.

Stevens was under the care of a neurologist for a year before she died. She had been treated for a nervous breakdown. Wilson attended Stevens over the Christmas and New Year's holidays in the absence of her neurologist. He found Stevens in a highly nervous state about a week before her demise. Wilson administered a hypodermic injection to which Stevens responded successfully.

The medical examiner, Dr. Charles Norris, said he found indications that Stevens had taken an overdose of a drug. Dr. Milton J. Wilson believed that Stevens had taken a sedative that did not contain an opiate. Wilson was called to Stevens' apartment the day before her death after she was found in a coma. He contended that pneumonia was the cause of the actress' death. Pneumonia developed after she lapsed into a coma. An autopsy revealed the official cause of death to be congestion of the viscera, which may have occurred from pneumonia that developed suddenly.

Stevens' funeral was conducted from her apartment. She was given an Episcopal service after which her body was taken to New Jersey for cremation.

== Filmography ==
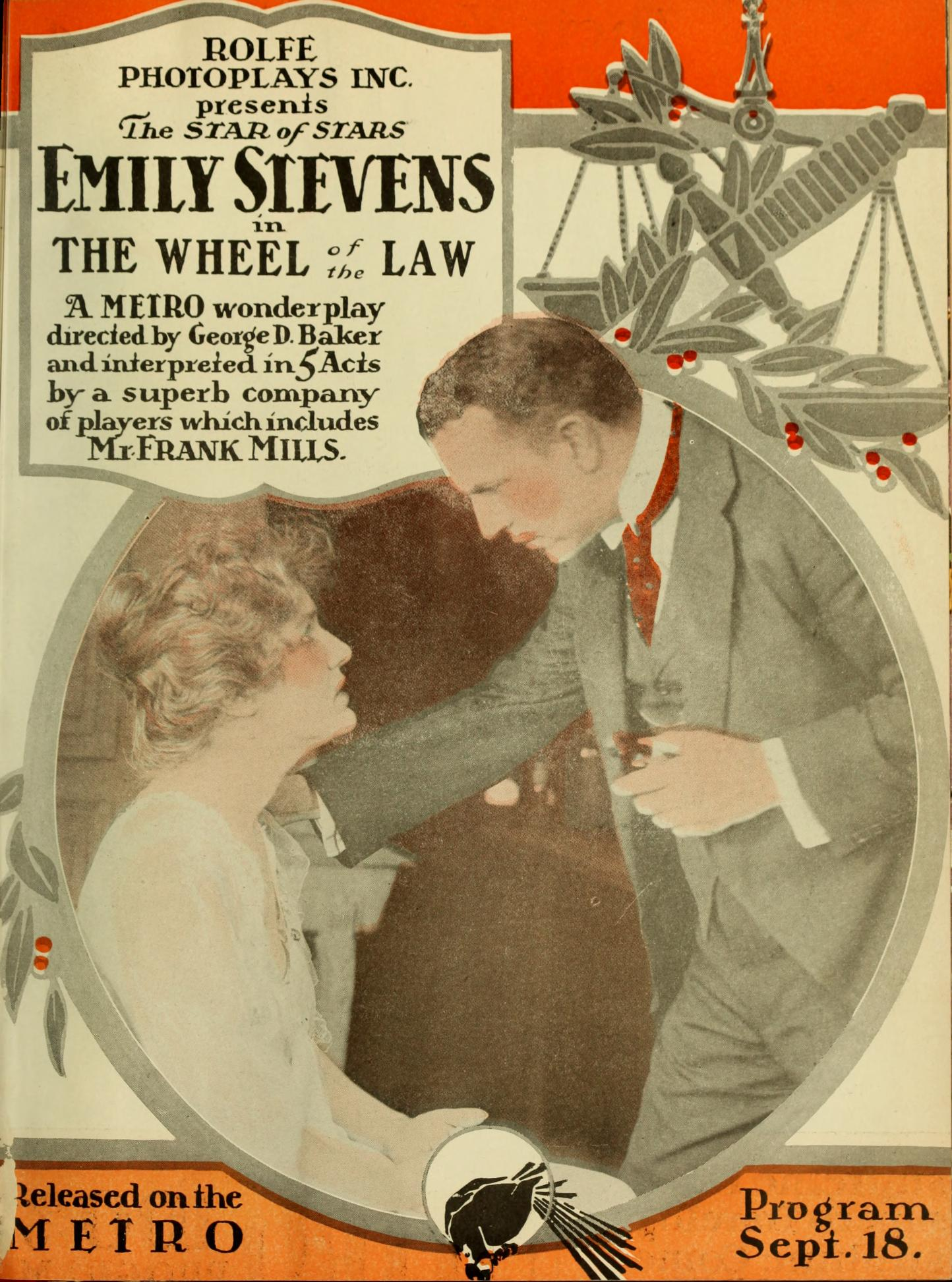
The Wheel of Law (1916)

- Cora (1915)
- Destiny; or The Soul of a Woman (1915) (print: incomplete Library of Congress)
- The House of Tears (1915)
- The Wheel of the Law (1916)
- The Wager (1916)
- The Slacker (1917) (print: preserved by MGM)
- A Sleeping Memory (1917) (print: preserved by MGM donor to G. Eastman Museum)
- Outwitted (1917)
- Alias Mrs. Jessop (1917) (print: Bois d'Arcy and Cinematheque Francais)
- Daybreak (1918)
- A Man's World (1918)
- Kildare of Storm (1918)
- Building for Democracy (1918) (short film)
- The Sacred Flame (1920)
- The Place of Honeymoons (1920)
