= The Misleading Lady =

The Misleading Lady may refer to:

- The Misleading Lady (play), a 1913 play by Charles W. Goddard and Paul Dickey which was the basis for the films
- The Misleading Lady (1916 film), a 1916 American silent comedy film directed by Arthur Berthelet
- The Misleading Lady (1920 film), a 1920 American silent comedy film co-directed by George Irving and George W. Terwilliger
- The Misleading Lady (1932 film), a 1932 American comedy film directed by Stuart Walker
