= The Shannons of Broadway =

Lost 1929 Comedy film

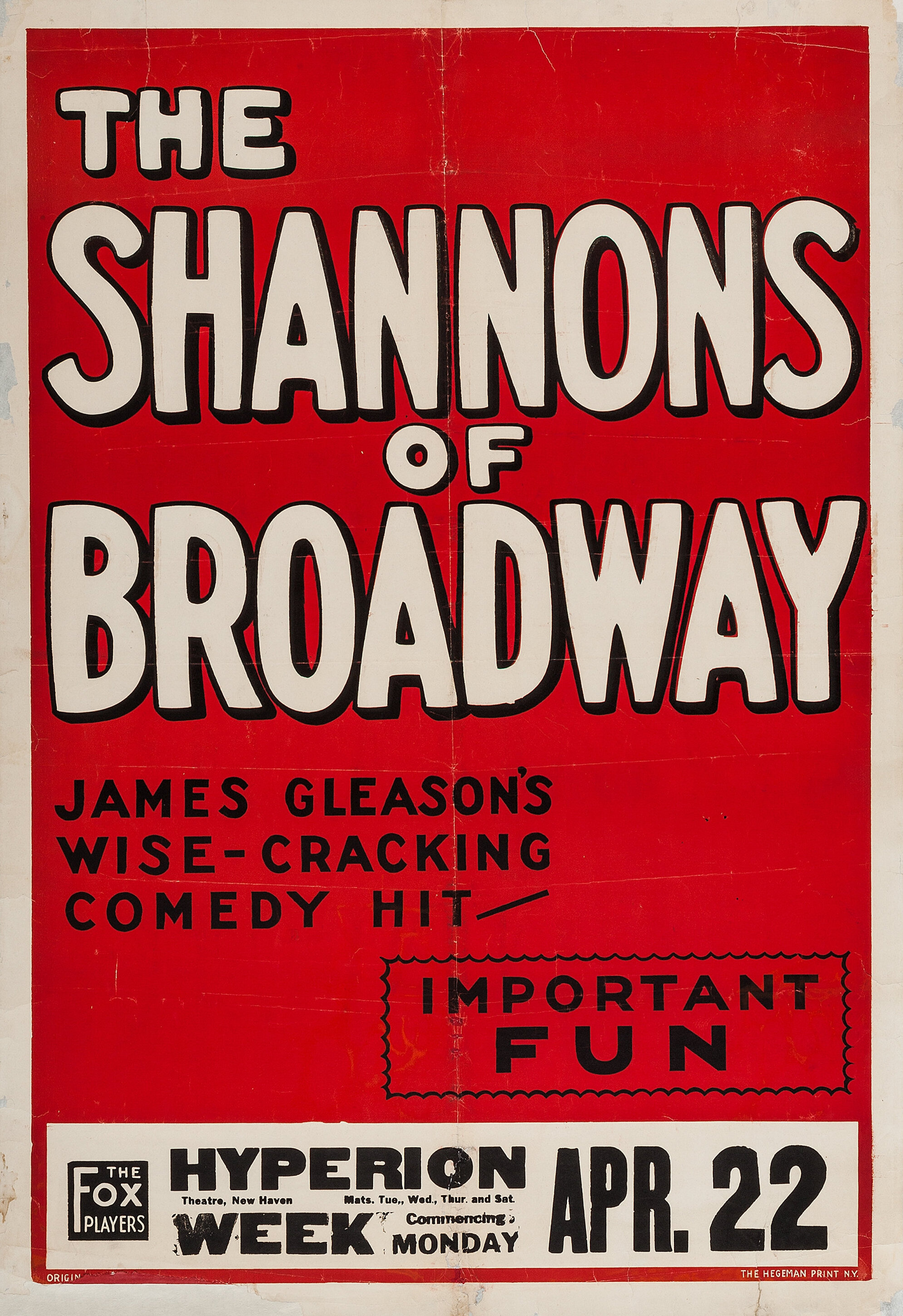
- Film poster
- Directed by: Emmett J. Flynn
- Written by: James Gleason (play); Agnes Christine Johnston
- Starring: James Gleason; Lucile Gleason; Mary Philbin
- Cinematography: Jerome Ash
- Edited by: Byron Robinson
- Production company: Universal Pictures
- Distributed by: Universal Pictures
- Release date: December 8, 1929
- Running time: 65 minutes
- Country: United States
- Language: English

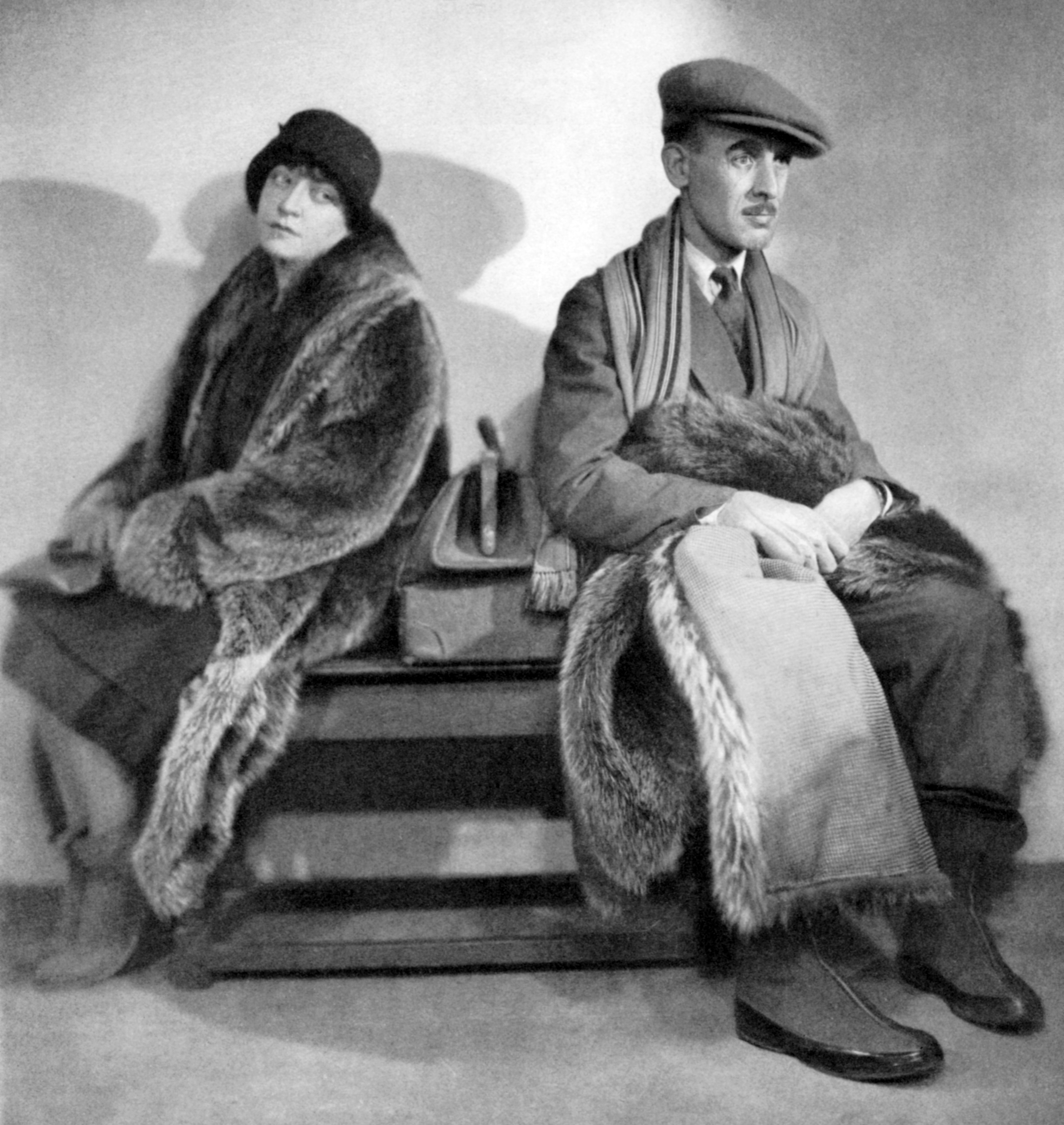
Lucile Gleason and James Gleason in the Broadway production of The Shannons of Broadway (1928)

The Shannons of Broadway is a 1929 American comedy film directed by Emmett J. Flynn and starring James Gleason, Lucile Gleason and Mary Philbin. It was based on James Gleason's 1927 play of the same title, which was later remade as Goodbye Broadway.

== Preservation ==
The film is considered lost. However, according to IMDb, a trailer for the film is held in the UCLA Film & Television Archive.

== Cast ==
- James Gleason as Mickey Shannon
- Lucile Gleason as Emma Shannon
- Mary Philbin as Tessie Swanzey
- John Breeden as Chuck
- Tom Santschi as Bradford
- Harry Tyler as Eddie Allen
- Gladys Crolius as Alice Allen
- Helen Mehrmann as Minerva
- Robert T. Haines as Albee
- Slim Summerville as Newt
- Tom Kennedy as Burt
- Walter Brennan as Hez
- Charley Grapewin as Swanzey

== See also ==
- List of early sound feature films (1926–1929)

== Bibliography ==
- Goble, Alan. The Complete Index to Literary Sources in Film. Walter de Gruyter, 1999.
