= The Misleading Lady (1920 film) =

1920 film by George Irving

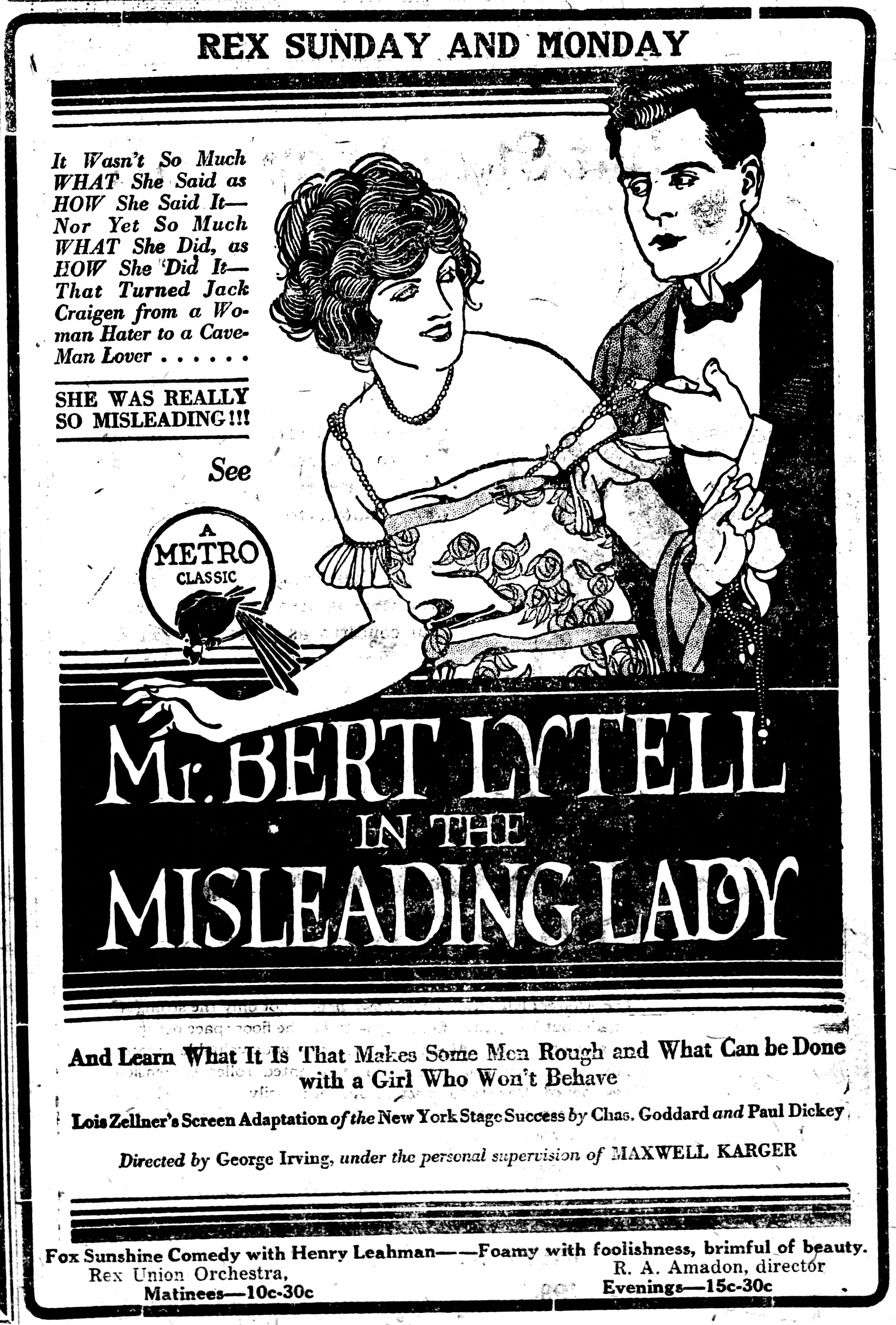
- Newspaper advertisement
- Directed by: George Irving; George W. Terwilliger
- Written by: Lois Zellner
- Based on: The Misleading Lady by Charles W. Goddard and Paul Dickey
- Produced by: Maxwell Karger
- Starring: Bert Lytell; Lucy Cotton; Frank Currier
- Cinematography: Arthur Martinelli; Sol Polito
- Production company: Metro Pictures
- Release date: December 20, 1920 (US)
- Running time: 6 reels
- Country: United States
- Language: English

The Misleading Lady is a 1920 American silent comedy film. Co-directed by George Irving and George W. Terwilliger, the film stars Bert Lytell, Lucy Cotton, and Frank Currier. It was released on December 20, 1920. No prints of the film are known to survive, so it is currently classified as lost.

== Cast ==
- Bert Lytell as Jack Craigen
- Lucy Cotton as Helen Steele
- Frank Currier as Napoleon
- Stephen Grattan as Cannell
- Rae Allen as Mrs. Cannell
- Cyril Chadwick as Tracey
- Barnet Parker as Steve
- Arthur Hausman as Reporter
