= The Misleading Lady (1932 film) =

1932 film

- Theatrical release poster
- Directed by: Stuart Walker
- Written by: Adelaide Heilbron; Caroline Francke
- Based on: The Misleading Lady by Charles W. Goddard and Paul Dickey
- Starring: Claudette Colbert; Edmund Lowe; Stuart Erwin
- Cinematography: George J. Folsey
- Music by: Johnny Green
- Distributed by: Paramount Pictures
- Release date: April 15, 1932
- Running time: 70 minutes
- Country: United States
- Language: English

The Misleading Lady is a 1932 American pre-Code comedy film directed by Stuart Walker, and starring Claudette Colbert and Edmund Lowe. The film is based on the 1913 Broadway play by Charles W. Goddard and Paul Dickey. It is also a remake of the 1920 Metro silent film original which starred Bert Lytell and Lucy Cotton, also based on the play.

On March 1, 1932, upon completion of this film, Paramount Pictures closed its Astoria Studios in Astoria, Queens, New York City.

The original play and its film depictions have been regarded as one of the origins of Napoleon delusions in the media.

== Plot ==
Helen Steele (Claudette Colbert) is bored to death of her empty lifestyle as a socialite. She decides to become an actress, but cannot get to see producer Sydney Parker (Robert Strange). She learns that Parker will be at a party at the home of her friend Alice Connell. She wants the lead in Parker's play The Siren. He feels that she is too nice a girl to convincingly play the part, so she bets him that, in exchange for an audition, she will be able to make Parker's friend, mining engineer Jack Craigen (Edmund Lowe), fall in love with her within three days.

She records Jack's proposal of marriage on a phonograph record to provide proof, but then has second thoughts about what she has done. Before she can explain the situation to Jack, he is publicly humiliated when he and all of the other guests inadvertently hear the recording. As Jack storms out, he is introduced to Tracy, Helen's fiancé. Helen breaks off her engagement and rushes to Jack's room to try to explain. Jack kidnaps her and steals another guest's autogyro to take to his home.

When she tries to escape, he chains her up. While he is out getting some water to make coffee, she spots another man. He sneaks in, but then reveals that he is an escapee from a nearby mental asylum and thinks he is "Boney". She screams for help when he grabs a sword. Jack plays along and manages to trick the lunatic into entering a room, which Jack then locks. After Jack receives a call informing him that Tracy is on his way there, armed with a gun, he decides to let Helen go, but then they argue. During the ensuing struggle, she hits him on the head with a hammer, knocking him out, and runs away into the snow-filled woods. She manages to reach a forest ranger. Meanwhile, Boney gets out and locks Jack up.

Reporter Fitzpatrick shows up, and mistaking the madman for Jack, warns him that Tracy is coming. Then two asylum guards show up to collect Boney, but he manages to get away. Eventually, everything gets straightened out, and the couple reconcile.

== Cast ==
- Claudette Colbert as Helen Steele
- Edmund Lowe as Jack Craigen
- Stuart Erwin as Boney
- Robert Strange as Sydney Parker
- George Meeker as Tracy
- Selena Royle as Alice Connell
- Curtis Cooksey as Bob Connell
- William Gargan as Fitzpatrick
- Nina Walker as Jane Neatherby
- Edgar Nelson as Steve
- Fred Stewart as Babs
- Harry Ellerbe as Spider
- Will Geer as McMahon
- Donald MacBride as Bill
- Grant Mitchell as Stephen Weatherbee

== Filming locations ==
- Kaufman Astoria Studios - 3412 36th Street, Astoria, Queens, New York City
