= The Shannons of Broadway (play) =

1927 play by James Gleason

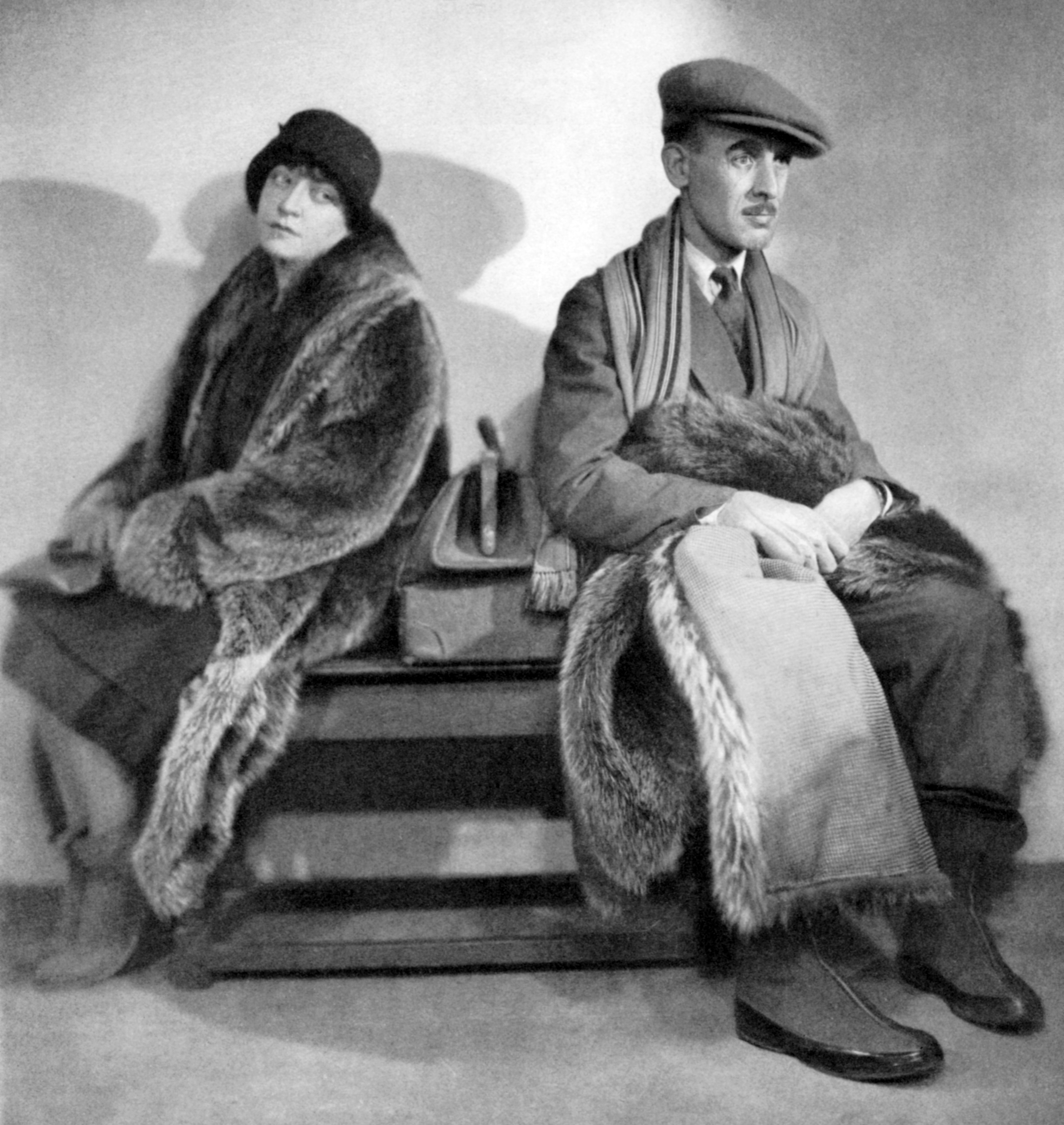
- Lucile Webster and James Gleason
- Original language: English
- Written by: James Gleason
- Subject: Wise-cracking vaudevillians run small-town hotel.
- Genre: Comedy
- Setting: A New England hotel lobby

Premiere
- Date: September 26, 1927
- Place: Martin Beck Theatre
- Directed by: Paul Dickey

The Shannons of Broadway is a 1927 play by James Gleason. It is a three-act comedy that leans towards melodrama, with two settings and twenty-four speaking characters. The action of the play takes place over four weeks time during early Spring in New England. The story concerns a vaudeville couple, stranded in a small New England town, who decide to buy the local hotel and run it.

The play was produced by Crosby Gaige and Earle Boothe, staged by Paul Dickey, with settings by Nicholas Yellenti. It starred the playwright and his wife, Lucile Webster. It had five brief tryouts then premiered on Broadway during September 1927. It ran nine months on Broadway, for 287 performances.

It was adapted for a 1929 early talking film of the same name, now considered lost.

== Characters ==
Characters are listed in order of appearance within their scope. Some minor characters are omitted.

Leads

- Emma Shannon is Henry's wife and partner, a perceptive judge of character, and a saxophone player.
- Mickey Shannon is a pugnacious vaudeville performer, who bickers with Emma constantly.

Supporting

- Vance Atkins is the railyard manager and local property owner whose brother is a state senator.
- Minerva Harper is a tall headstrong young blonde, chief biscuit shooter (waitress) for the dining room.
- Chuck Bradford is a young man who has taken to drink after his father forbade him to see Tessie.
- Theresa Sutton called Tessie, is a pretty young librarian, educated out of town and therefore suspect.
- Charles Bradford, Sr is Chuck's father, the town's biggest landowner, an unprincipled sharper.
- Newton D. Eddy called Newt, is a weak, weaselly, undersized country shyster.
- Eddie Allen is a down-at-heels vaudevillian with a lousy act and a sick wife.

Featured

- Shorty Jones is the hotel porter and man of all work. (Note: This character was named Jughead Jones in the early tryout cast lists.)
- Pa Swanzey is the elderly hotel owner who dislikes actors.
- Charley Dill is a railroad man, a loafer whom Henry Shannon labels the "town clown". (Note: This character was credited in cast lists to George Spelvin.)
- Hez Davis is the local bootlegger, who distills the applejack he peddles.
- Bert Savage is a large and belligerent brakeman for the railroad.
- Oscar is the local theater billing agent.
- Ma Swanzey is Swanzey's elderly wife, who is a kindly soul.
- Annie Todd is a young waitress in the dining room, mutually fond of Oscar.
- Alice Allen is Eddie's sickly wife and partner, whose only real talent is sewing.
- A Guest, called Phil, an actor who verbally spars with Mickey.
- The Melody Boys are Tom, Bill, Jake, and Pat, a saxophone act once managed by Emma.
- Mr. Albee is not that Mr. Albee, but a hotel chain representative.

== Synopsis ==
The locale of the play is a small-town hotel with a dining room and barber shop attached, in Sutton, New England. (Note: Theater programmes, reviews, and the published play say "New England", but Tessie's dialogue in Act I establishes that the state is Massachusetts. There is a real Sutton, Massachusetts, but whether it served as inspiration to Gleason is unknown.)

Act I (A shabby old-fashioned hotel lobby. An early spring evening.) The "railroad trade" relaxes in the hotel lobby after their dinner on a snowy day. The railroad supplies its workers with meal tickets to the hotel dining room. Oscar greets Charley, Vance, and Pa Swanzey, while taking down a theater bill: the vaudeville show just folded. Bert comes in late and Minerva blocks him from entering the dining room, but promises he can eat after she goes to the pictures. Emma and Mickey Shannon come in from the cold, but Pa Swanzey will not let them stay because they are "actors". Mrs. Swanzey intervenes to allow the Shannons to warm themselves at the pot-bellied stove. Emma forestalls Nez Davis from getting Chuck Bradford any drunker. The Shannons overhear how Charles Bradford Sr is pressuring Pa Swanzey to sell the hotel and his other property outside town. Bradford shows up to take Chuck home and threaten Nez Davis and Pa Swanzey over the bootleg hooch. Tessie confronts Bradford and Newt Eddy over the invalid lien against the hotel, and a general fracas ensues when Bradford insults her. Emma and Mickey persuade Pa Swanzey to sell them the hotel for $6000, which they had been saving for a farm. Minerva, whom Emma had slapped down earlier for sassing her, is dismayed but the Swanzeys are elated. (Curtain)

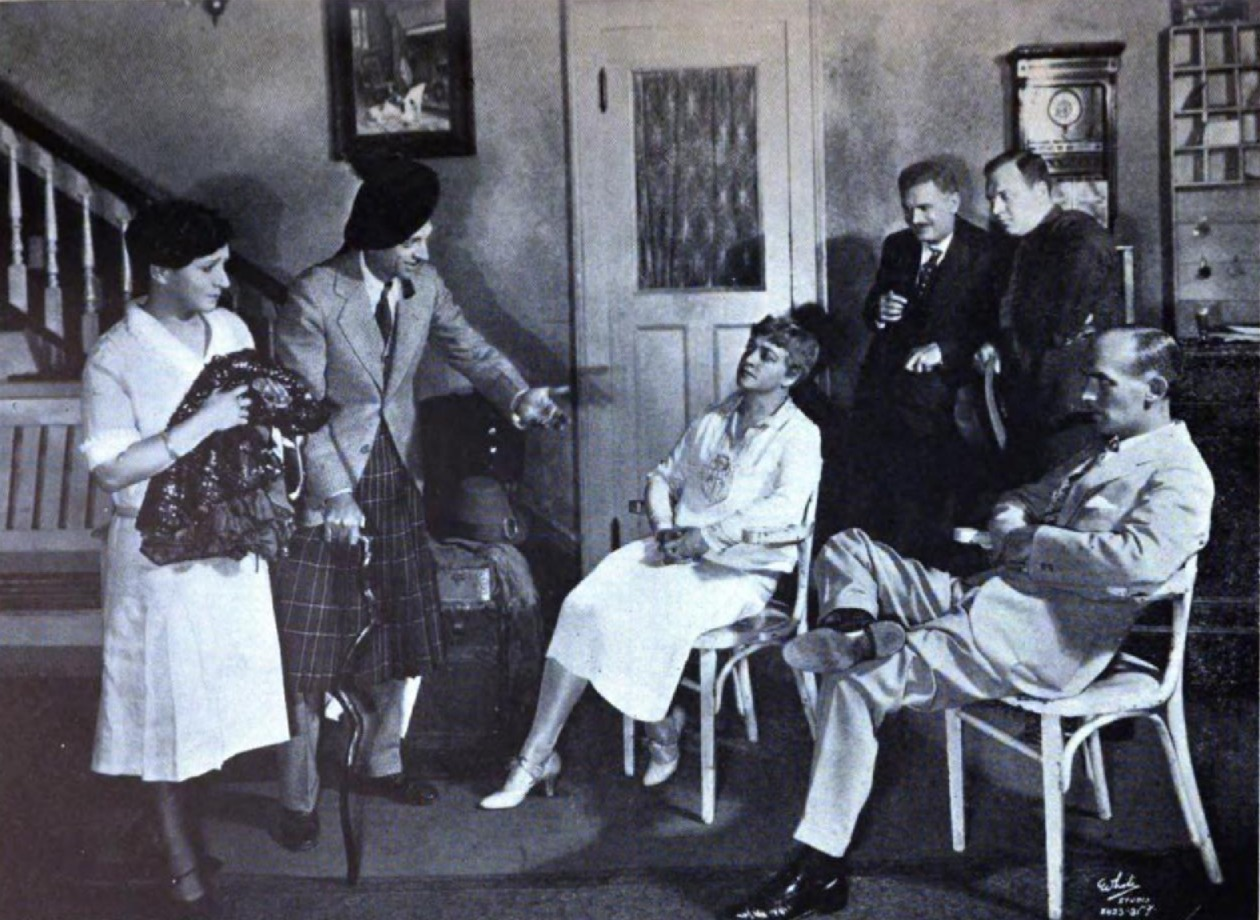

Act II (Same as Act I, with refurbished lobby. A few weeks later.) Mickey is manning the front desk when hotel guests Eddie and Alice Allen admit they can't pay the room bill. They offer to demonstrate their vaudeville act to establish credit worthiness. It is dismal and the Shannons tell them so. But instead of ejecting the Allens and confiscating their luggage, they offer them jobs as night clerk and seamstress with free room and board. Vance Atkins, impressed with the Shannons generosity, tells them about the planned railroad expansion and new "government flying field" planned for outside of town. He learned from his brother the construction would be north of the river, which is just where Bradford is buying land options. Emma charms Newt and sends him out with a $3000 check to buy up options before Bradford does. Chuck, who has stopped drinking and opposes his father over Tessie, is also sent out to buy options with another $3000 check. The Melody Boys arrive, and are given a corner suite and invited to practice their saxophones in the hotel. Emma, however, has forgotten to get Mickey's buy-in for the land options. When he learns she has given the last of their savings to comparative strangers, he explodes and threatens to leave. (Curtain)

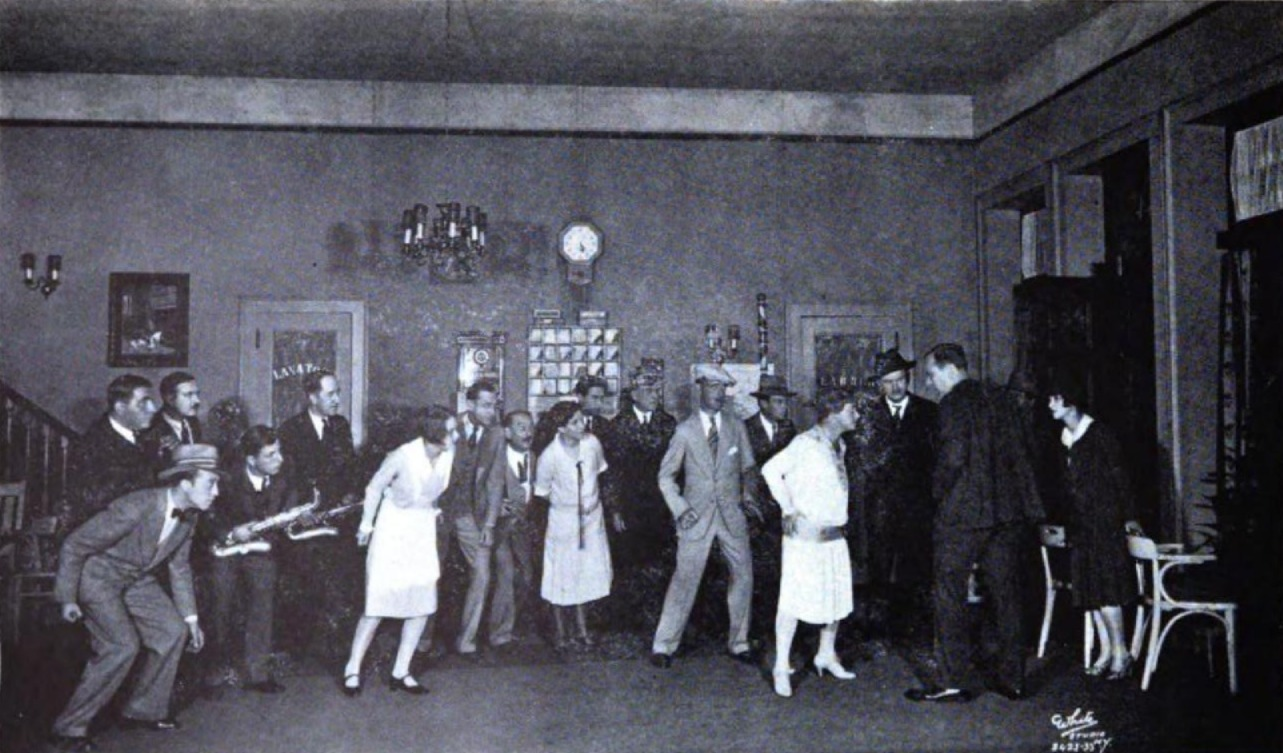

Act III (Same as Act II. Next day, early afternoon.) Emma and Mickey have reconciled. Minerva comes crying to Emma; Bert is ignoring her since she is now "in trouble". Emma assures her she won't lose her job or room. Mickey is just phoning Bradford to offer the hotel for sale, as he's convinced their savings are lost. Just then Mr. Albee comes into the lobby. After some initial confusion over his identity, the deflated Shannons perk up when he offers to pay $25,000 for the hotel. He further informs them that all the new projects are going south of the river. Now Vance enters, dragging a fearful Newt, who admits buying the options north of the river with Emma's check, but recording them in Bradford's name. Chuck then comes to confess he second-guessed Emma, and bought south of the river instead of north. Elated, Mickey gleefully pounces on Bradford when he comes to buy the hotel. Mickey scares him with jail for sub-borning Newt, while Chuck threatens him for again insulting Tessie. Bradford repays the money Newt spent for him, and yields to his son about marrying Tessie. Now Bert arrives and is confronted by Emma, who demands he marry Minerva. He refuses until Mickey knocks him down, then relents. With the Melody Boys providing the music, the entire cast goes into a song and dance number: the Shannons are returning to Broadway. (Curtain)

== Original production ==
=== Background ===
Crosby Gaige and Earle Boothe announced in late May 1927 that they would produce The Shannons of Broadway by James Gleason starting in September, and that Gleason's wife Lucile Webster would have a leading part. She had last worked with her husband when he directed her in The Butter and Egg Man during 1925. She enjoyed a long-running success with that play until its sudden cancellation in February 1927 when star Gregory Kelly suffered a heart attack. Gleason promised Webster his next play would have a leading part for her, which he fulfilled with The Shannons of Broadway. Gleason also had written a role for his mother, actress Mina C. Crolius, but a fractured rib led to her sister Louise Crolius taking the part instead.

Rehearsals started August 22, 1927, while a week later the director was announced as Paul Dickey. Gleason was reported to be playing second lead to his wife as primary, while Nicholas Yellenti designed the settings.

=== Cast ===
Principal cast from the first tryout through the Broadway run.
Role	Actor	Dates	Notes and sources
Emma Shannon	Lucile Webster	Sep 05, 1927 - Apr 07, 1928	
Emma Shannon	Gladys Crolius	Apr 09, 1928 - Jun 02, 1928	Crolius took over when Webster left for an extended vacation.
Mickey Shannon	James Gleason	Sep 05, 1927 - Apr 07, 1928	
Mickey Shannon	Harry Tyler	Apr 09, 1928 - Jun 02, 1928	Tyler took over when Gleason left for an extended vacation.
Vance Atkins	Leo Lindhard	Sep 05, 1927 - Jun 02, 1928	
Minerva Harper	Helen Mehrmann	Sep 05, 1927 - Jun 02, 1928	
Chuck Bradford	Frank Hearn	Sep 05, 1927 - Jun 02, 1928	
Theresa Sutton	Suzanne Sheldon	Sep 05, 1927 - Jun 02, 1928	
Charles Bradford, Sr	Percy Moore	Sep 05, 1927 - Jun 02, 1928	
Newt Eddy	Charles Brokate	Sep 05, 1927 - Jun 02, 1928	
Eddie Allen	Harry Tyler	Sep 05, 1927 - Apr 07, 1928	
Eddie Allen	Jay Hanna	Apr 09, 1928 - Jun 02, 1928	Hanna took over for Tyler when the latter replaced Gleason as the male lead.
Shorty Jones	Eddie Heron	Sep 05, 1927 - Jun 02, 1928	
Pa Swanzey	George Farren	Sep 05, 1927 - Jun 02, 1928	
Hez Davis	Guy Nichols	Sep 05, 1927 - Jun 02, 1928	
Bert Savage	Thomas Joyce	Sep 05, 1927 - Jun 02, 1928	When not acting, Joyce was a cabaret and radio singer.
Oscar	Joseph Raymond	Sep 05, 1927 - Jun 02, 1928	
Ma Swanzey	Louise Crolius	Sep 05, 1927 - Jun 02, 1928	She was an aunt of James Gleason, a stock company performer in the West.
Annie Todd	Daphne Wilson	Sep 05, 1927 - Jun 02, 1928	An English actress who had to mimic a New England accent for this performance.
Alice Allen	Gladys Crolius	Sep 05, 1927 - Apr 07, 1928	A cousin of Gleason, she was married to Harry Tyler, who was also her stage husband in this play.
Alice Allen	Laura Straub	Apr 09, 1928 - Jun 02, 1928	Straub replaced Crolius when the latter took over the female lead.
Mr. Albee	Bertram Millar	Sep 05, 1927 - Jun 02, 1928	

=== Tryouts ===
The Shannons of Broadway had its first tryout at the Broadway Theatre in Long Branch, New Jersey, on September 5, 1927. The local reviewer said the audience enjoyed both the laughs and the pathos, despite long-windedness in the second act. The second tryout started September 9, 1926, at the Savoy Theatre in Asbury Park, New Jersey. Max D. Davidson in the Asbury Park Press reported the story took its "framework from old melodrama" but the play itself was comedy. He also claimed its depiction of theater folks was more accurate than usual with recent plays, having "the flavor of footlight fidelity" with stage in-jokes.

The production next went to the Shubert Theatre in New Haven, Connecticut on September 12, 1927, for a three-day run. Another three-day tryout occurred at Parsons Theatre in Hartford, Connecticut starting September 15, 1927. The local reviewer described the action as "brisk" and said "The piece is not pretentious; its aim is solely to please", which it did. Besides the two leads, they singled out Eddie Heron's porter, Henry Tyler's vaudevillian, and Helen Mehrmann's waitress "as excellent bits of character work". The final tryout was a weeklong run at the Bronx Opera House starting September 19, 1927.

=== Broadway premiere and reception ===
The production had its Broadway premiere at the Martin Beck Theatre on September 26, 1927. The critic for The Brooklyn Daily Times said there were more fisticuffs in The Shannons of Broadway than in a Chicago week-end, but despite the action and laughs it was "little more than a glorified song and chatter bit". In spite of the in-jokes, there was "little real vaudeville atmosphere, only a hokum story shot through with wise patter apropos of the vaudeville racket" according to the reviewer for the Brooklyn Eagle. Gleason and Webster were so good, they dominated the mediocre cast, except for Harry Tyler's "ham vaudevillian". The New York Times reviewer agreed Gleason and Webster kept everything moving on stage, but was most impressed by the wallop Webster gave the tall blonde waitress, declaring Helen Mehrmann the best of the supporting cast.

Burns Mantle said The Shannons of Broadway was not a comic masterpiece, but did have the advantage of Gleason's up-to-date slangy dialogue. He did not think it would rival Gleason's earlier Is Zat So? for longevity, but would last several months and because of all his relatives in the cast, keep the profits in the family. The reviewer for the Brooklyn Times Union disagreed, saying Gleason "wrote it on the same typewriter" as Is Zat So?, and it should still be playing "at the Martin Beck Theatre for the next six months".

=== Broadway closing ===
The Shannons of Broadway closed at the Martin Beck Theatre on June 2, 1928, after 287 performances. (Note: This include 285 recorded by the New York Daily News feature "The Golden Dozen", plus the matinee and evening show performed later that day.)

== Adaptations ==
=== Film ===
- The Shannons of Broadway (1929) This "all-taking picture" starred Lucile Webster Gleason and James Gleason, with Harry Tyler, Gladys Crolius, and Helen Mehrmann also reprising their original roles from the stage play.

== Bibliography ==
- James Gleason. The Shannons of Broadway: A Comedy in Three Acts. Samuel French, 1928.
