= The Misleading Lady (1916 film) =

1916 film by Arthur Berthelet

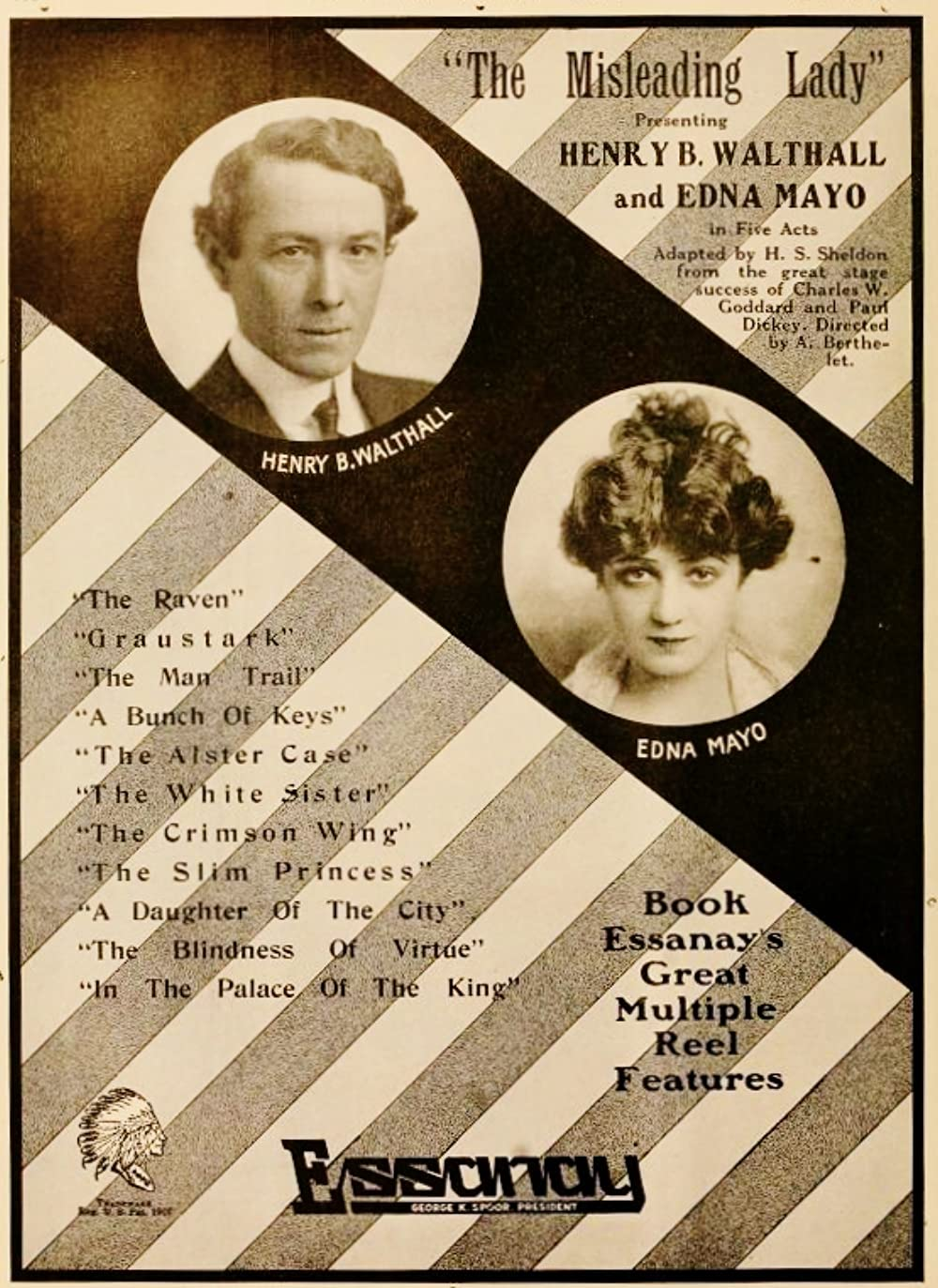
- Directed by: Arthur Berthelet
- Written by: H. S. Sheldon
- Based on: The Misleading Lady by Charles W. Goddard and Paul Dickey
- Starring: Henry B. Walthall; Edna Mayo; Sidney Ainsworth
- Cinematography: Arthur Reeves
- Production company: Essanay Studios
- Distributed by: V-L-S-E
- Release date: January 3, 1916
- Running time: 50 minutes
- Country: United States
- Languages: Silent; English intertitles

The Misleading Lady is a 1916 American silent comedy-drama film directed by Arthur Berthelet and starring Henry B. Walthall, Edna Mayo and Sidney Ainsworth. It is an adaptation of the play of the same title by Paul Dickey and Charles W. Goddard which was made into films on several occasions. It marked the screen debut of Edward Arnold.

== Cast ==
- Henry B. Walthall as Jack Craiger
- Edna Mayo as Helen Steele
- Sidney Ainsworth as Henry Tracey
- Edward Arnold as Sidney Parker
- Harry Dunkinson as Boney
- John Junior as Keen Fitzpatrick
- John Cossar as John W. Cannell
- Charles J. Stine as Innkeeper
- Grant Mitchell as Stephen Weatherbeea
- Renee Clemmons as Jane Wentworth
- Frances Raymond as Mrs. Cannell

== Production ==
This is the first film version of the play. It was shot at the Essanay studios.

== Release and reception ==
The film, that had five reels, was released on 10 January 1916.

"This is a story of a primitive wooing ... Arthur Berthelet has made the most of this stirring drama.", wrote The Moving Picture World.

== Bibliography ==
- Goble, Alan. The Complete Index to Literary Sources in Film. Walter de Gruyter, 1999.
