= Paul Dickey =

American actor, director, playwright 1886-1933

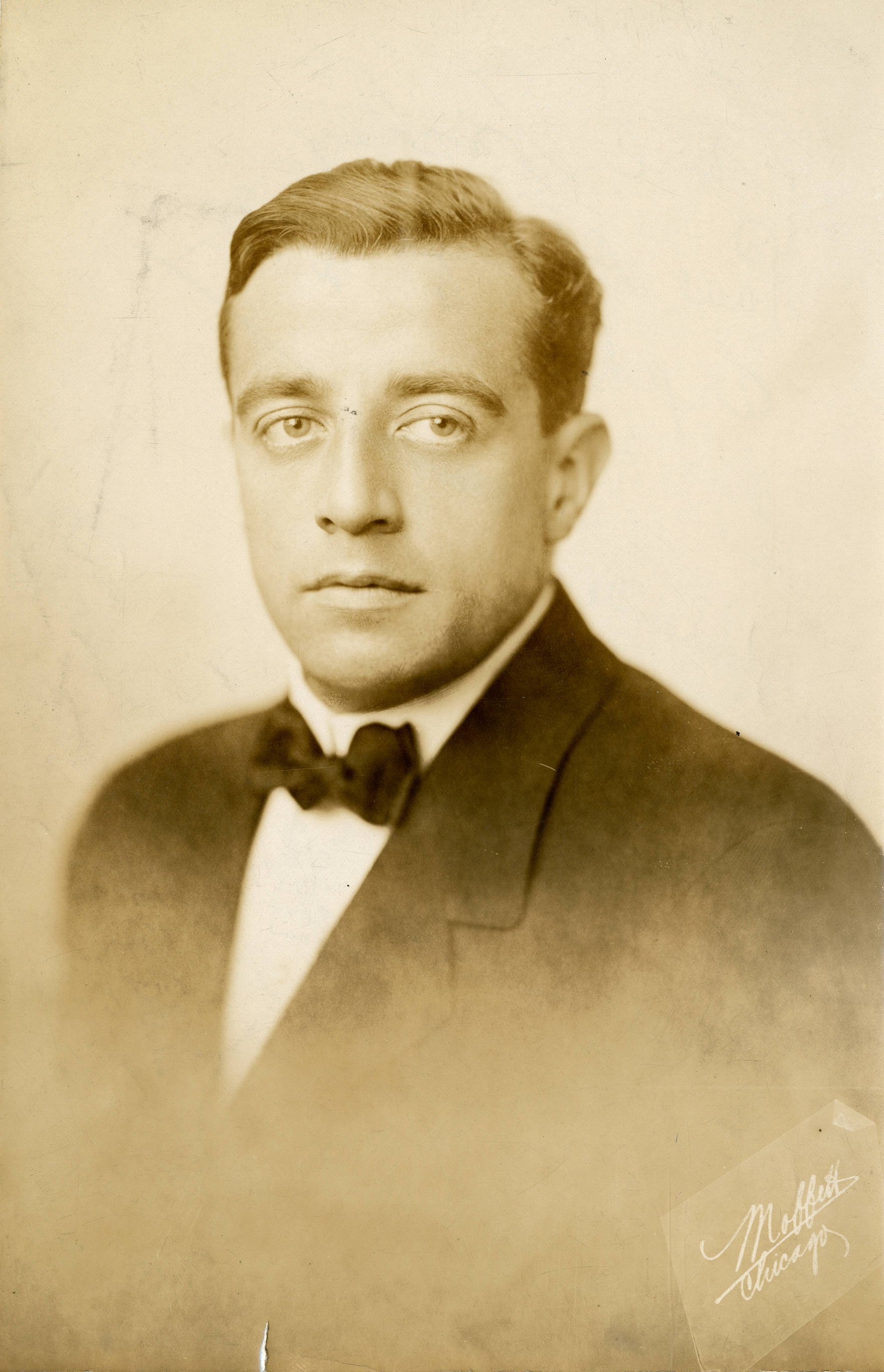
- Paul Dickey 1912
- Born: Paul Bert Dickey; May 12, 1883; Chicago, Illinois, U.S.
- Died: January 8, 1933 (aged 49); Manhattan, New York, U.S.
- Education: University of Michigan (attended)
- Occupations: Actor, Director, Playwright, Screenwriter
- Years active: 1906 - 1933
- Known for: The Ghost Breaker, The Misleading Lady, The Broken Wing, Rose-Marie
- Spouse: Inez Plummer (m. 1919–1933)
- Relatives: Basil Dickey (older brother); Charles W. Goddard (brother-in-law)

Paul Dickey (May 12, 1883 – January 8, 1933) was an American actor, director, playwright, screenwriter, and an early aviator. A star athlete in high school, he ran track and played football for the University of Michigan. A serious bout of typhoid fever ended his athletic career, after which he focused on dramatics, leaving college to enter vaudeville in 1906. Teaming up with journalist Charles W. Goddard, he had a successful playwriting career on Broadway, with The Ghost Breaker, an early comedy horror work, and The Misleading Lady which popularized the Napoleon imposter trope. He enlisted in the United States Marine Corps (USMC) during World War I, and served in France as an officer for a bomber squadron. After the war, he became involved with writing and directing silent films, had another Broadway hit with The Broken Wing, played the villain to Douglas Fairbanks in Robin Hood, and directed the long-running musical Rose-Marie. Dickey also gave George Abbott his first Broadway role, keeping him in theater when he was ready to quit. Dickey's later career concentrated on directing and writing, as recurring heart trouble limited his performances. He died of a heart attack at age 49.

== Early years ==
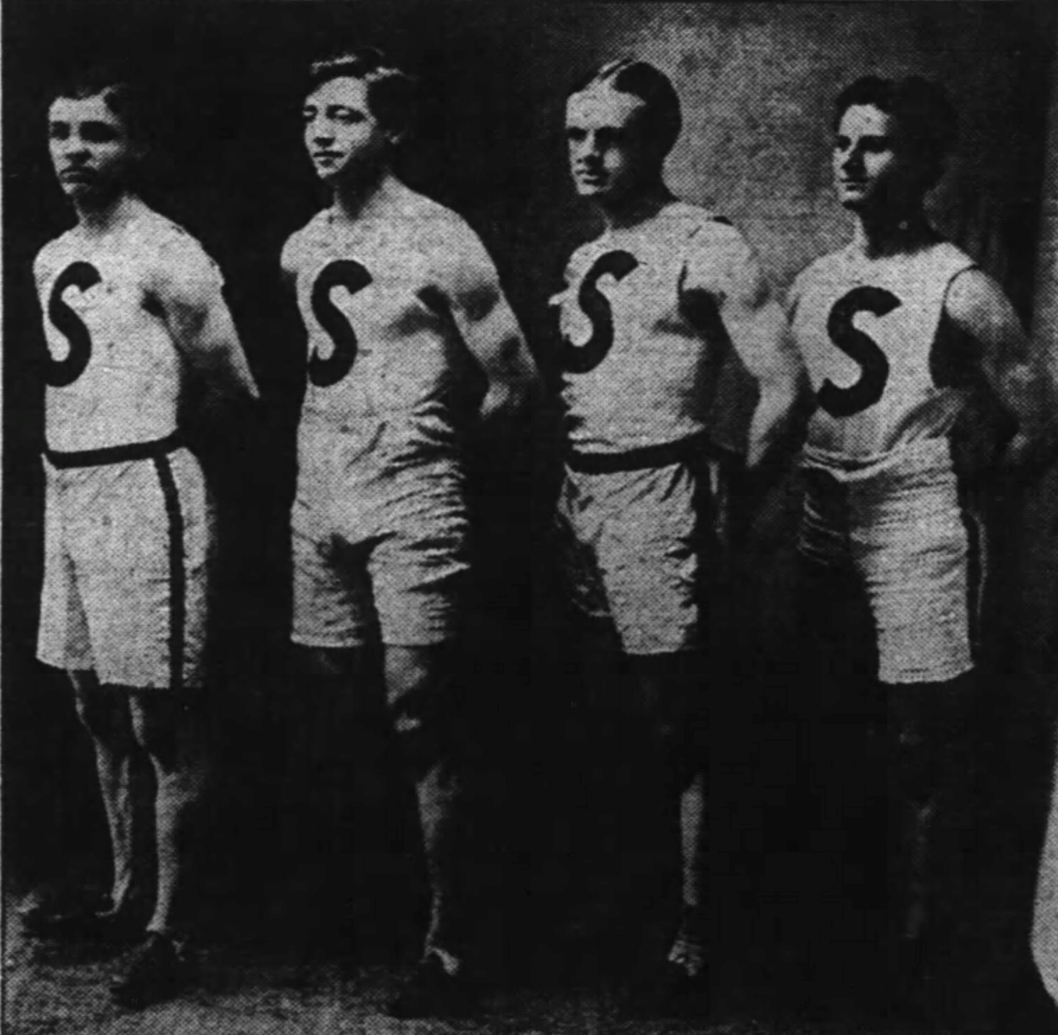
Dickey (2nd from left) 1902

Paul Dickey was born on May 12, 1883, in Chicago, to Frank H. Dickey, a lawyer from New York, who later became a judge and co-founded a small Chicago-area bank. His mother, who was from Wisconsin, died when he was a child. Dickey and his two older brothers and younger sister lived with their father and paternal aunt, Isabel Dickey. Dickey attended South Division High School, where he took part in boxing, track, football, and dramatics. He also competed in a YMCA athletic meet, winning the pole vault and long jump events, and was a member of the relay race team from South Division that won a Chicago-wide interscholastic championship.

== College ==
After graduating high school in June 1902, he was actively recruited by the football programs of Chicago under Amos Alonzo Stagg and Michigan under Fielding Yost. Choosing the latter, he made the varsity squad as a freshman, (Note: His swollen pride at this achievement led, by his own later admission, to a cruel hoax played on him by varsity upperclassmen. He later used the incident as the basis for his vaudeville sketch The Comeback.) playing substitute left halfback. Many years later, Yost said Dickey, although a sub, usually managed to get playing time in each game. While at Michigan, Dickey pledged Delta Upsilon fraternity and sang bass with the Men's Glee Club. Dickey also became a member of the University's Comedy Club, which performed many type of stage works. He was on Michigan's track and field team in the spring of 1903, but his athletic career was cut short in his sophomore year by an extended bout of typhoid fever, followed by an attack of appendicitis. He lost academic credit for 1903-1904, but was able to return to Michigan for another year and a half, during which he concentrated on dramatics. However, by May 1906 he had left college to pursue a vaudeville career.

== Early stage career ==
=== Vaudeville beginning ===
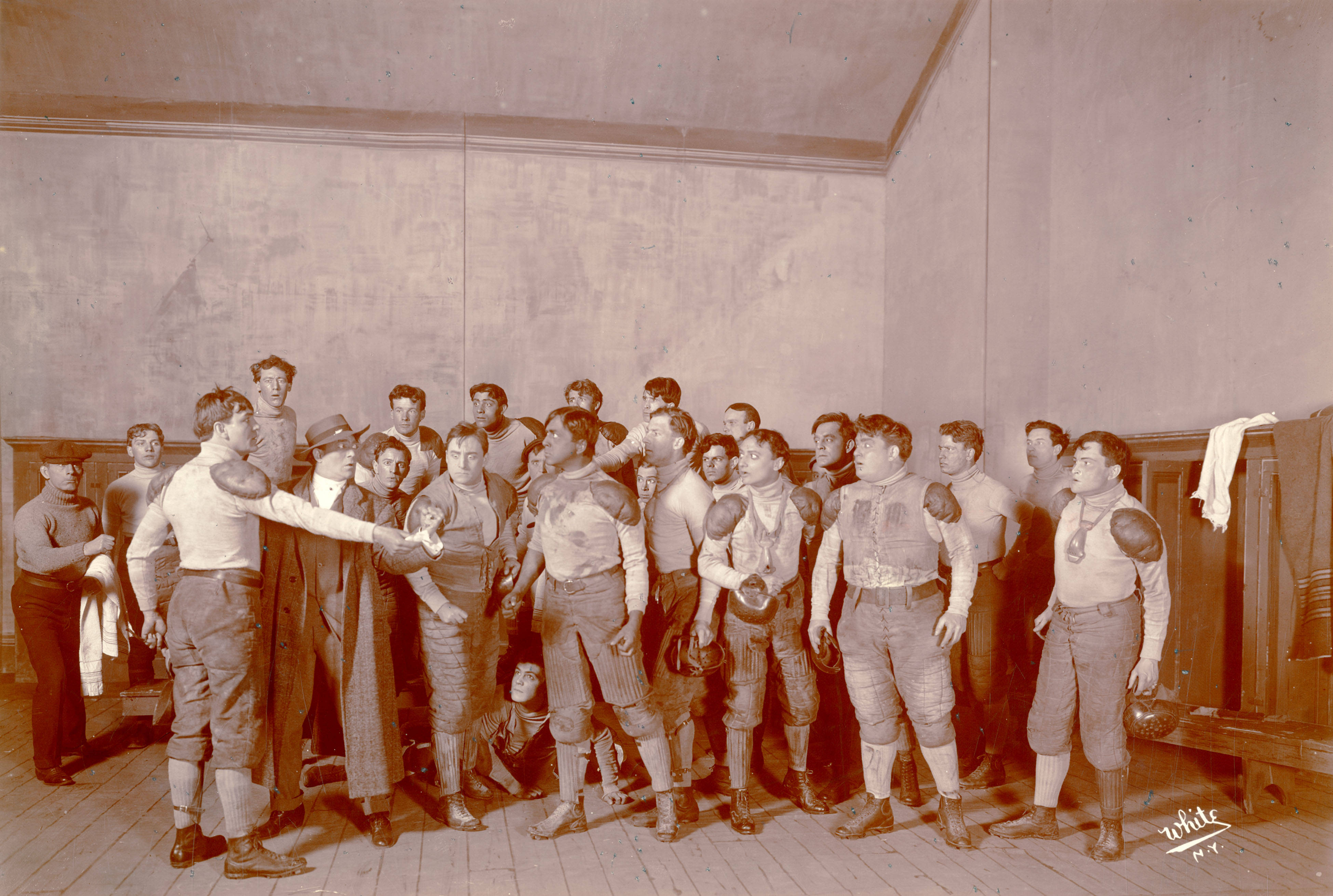
Strongheart with Robert Edeson (center)

Dickey began his career in vaudeville doing a solo act of stage celebrity impressions, (Note: The term hadn't been popularized yet, and was referred to as being a "character change artist".) at that time considered a novelty. He followed a vaudeville circuit from the West to New York City, where in August 1906 he joined Robert Edeson's touring company for Strongheart. A four-act play by William C. DeMille, this work centered around a Native American athlete at Columbia University who experiences racial prejudice while leading the football team to victory. Dickey stayed with the tour through April 1907, receiving a larger role when the production went overseas to London's Aldwych Theatre in May 1907.

After the Strongheart tour returned to America, Edgar Selwyn took over the lead, and Dickey was given a supporting role when it opened in Chicago during August 1907. The tour finished up in Poughkeepsie, New York on March 30, 1908. Dickey wrote a one-act play called The Counterfeit Champion in May 1908, which he was reportedly going to play in vaudeville that summer. However, he joined the Paul McAllister Stock Company in June, playing at Hurtig & Seamon's Music Hall in Harlem.

=== Pierre of the Plains ===
Henry B. Harris, who had directed Dickey in Strongheart, cast him for a role in a new production during July 1908. For Pierre of the Plains, Dickey would again be supporting Edgar Selwyn, who had adapted the play from the stories of Pierre and His People by Canadian author Gilbert Parker. The production had a tryout in Pittston, Pennsylvania starting September 19, 1908, before its opening run in Toronto. A week later it went to Montreal, and on October 12, 1908, both the play and Dickey had their Broadway premieres at the Harris-owned Hudson Theatre. The New York Times reviewer noted that Paul Dickey was an unknown, but one that showed promise. Other newspaper critics had mixed opinions on the play, but were enthusiastic about Dickey and his spectacular third act fall.

As Jap Durgan, Dickey played the sworn enemy of the play's protagonist, the half-breed Pierre (Edgar Selwyn). Dickey's character fights Pierre, is stabbed by him, and falls eighteen feet down a "steep incline representing a hillside". In Montreal, Dickey had to be hospitalized once when the fall went wrong. He was injured again the second night on Broadway, but was able to limp offstage. Producer Henry B. Harris took out an insurance policy on Dickey, as the bowie knife fight came to be regarded as the "thing that sealed the success of the piece". A Cleveland newspaper even printed a drawing showing the various stages of the stabbing and fall. The stunt, whose success Dickey attributed to football experience (Note: Dickey's understudy was Purnell Pratt who normally played Inspector Whitby, and had been a football player for Penn.) in falling and padding, was widely celebrated in print.

When Pierre of the Plains closed on Broadway, Dickey went on tour with it to Chicago, starting November 11, 1908. The tour reached Philadelphia in December, where it finished. While trying to secure lodging in Manhattan after Pierre of the Plains, Dickey clashed with another young fellow over a room in a 46th Street boarding house. This was journalist Charles W. Goddard from Portland, Maine. After a night arguing, they struck up a friendship. Dickey was impressed with the dramatic potential of a scenario Goddard had written called The Ghost Breaker. They would spend several months expanding it to a four-act "melodramatic farce".

=== Leading man ===
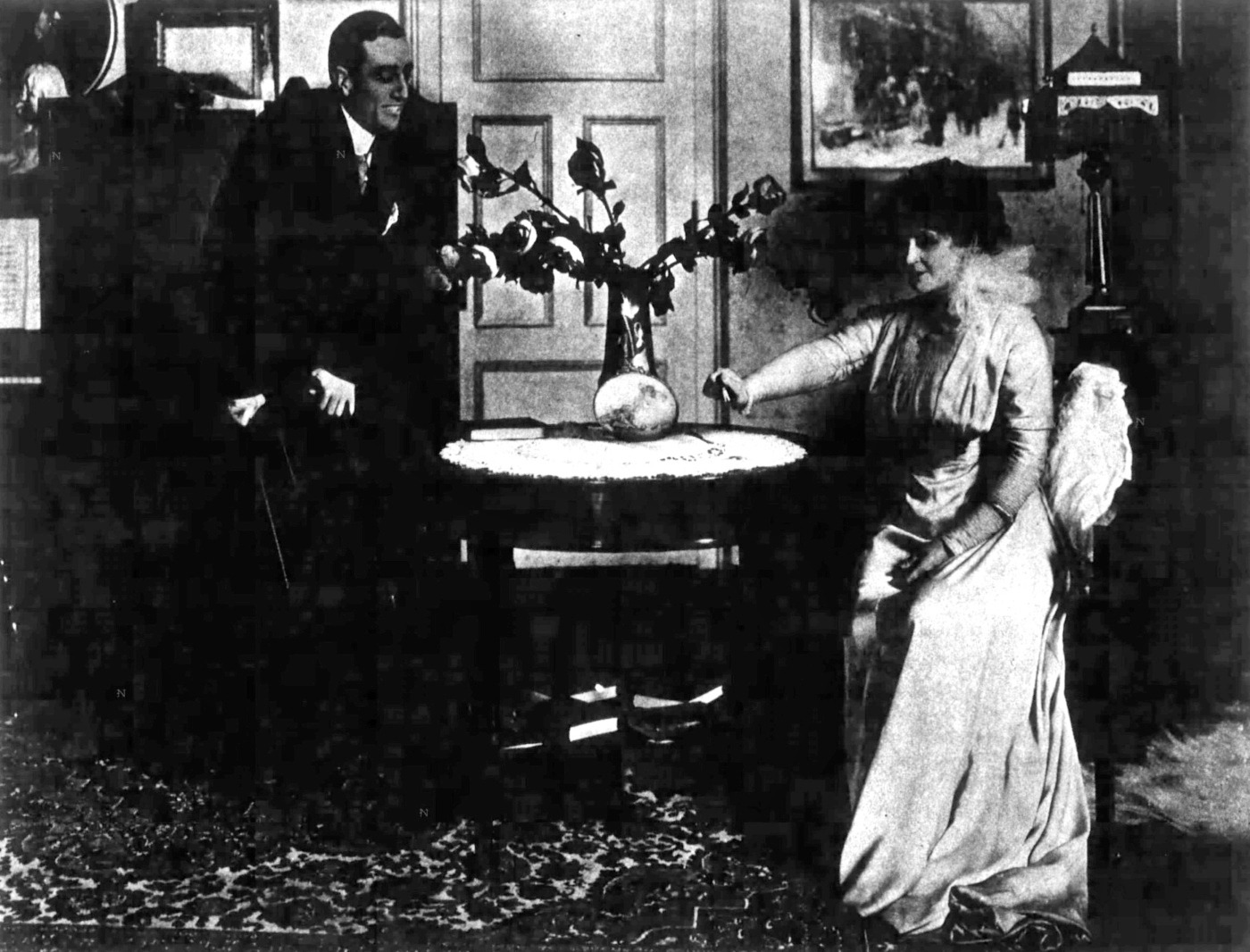

Dickey was signed to appear with Henrietta Crosman in January 1909. From late March 1909 he performed on Broadway as leading man for her in Sham, a comedy by Geraldine Bonner and Elmer Harris. Dickey played a western fellow come east to woo a penniless society woman (Henrietta Crosman) and was reported to act with "directesness and good taste". Dickey went on tour with Sham starting in May 1909. During this run, Dickey and Charles W. Goddard sold their play, The Ghost Breaker to Henry B. Harris.

While on the summer break for Sham, Dickey vacationed in Wisconsin. When the production resumed in August 1909 for a tour, Dickey met a replacement cast member, Inez Plummer. Plummer was the daughter of a Shubert Theater manager in Syracuse, New York. Dickey and Plummer stayed with the tour for Sham until it ended in late April 1910. By this time Harris had returned the manuscript for The Ghost Breaker, still unproduced, to Dickey and Goddard. Dickey joined the Stubbs-Wilson players for summer stock at Olentangy Park Theatre in Columbus, Ohio during May 1910. This provided Dickey and Goddard with an opportunity to stage a low-budget tryout for The Ghost Breaker at the same theater when the stock season ended. The authors financed it themselves, and Dickey played the leading man. The tryout resulted in national publicity when Dickey was nearly killed by a sword during one performance.

Besides The Ghost Breaker, Dickey also produced in Columbus a one-act play he and Goddard wrote, called The Man from the Sea. It was with this latter play that Dickey performed in vaudeville during the fall of 1910, sponsored by Maurice Campbell. The playlet dealt with wireless telegraphy in a bizarre love triangle that becomes a ghost story. (Note: Two men, competing for a woman, draw cards to see which one will withdraw by going to sea. The winner, who owns a wireless station, hears from it that the loser has drowned at sea. He is about to marry the woman, when the drowned man appears and demands a recut. This time the dead man wins and both he and the woman vanish. The wireless machine then announces the death of the couple at sea.) By early February 1911, Dickey was in Chicago as leading man to Helen Ware in The Deserters.

=== Return to Vaudeville ===
The Come Back (Note: It was also listed sometimes as The Comeback.) was Dickey's one-act comedy that originated with an incident from his freshman year at Michigan. By March 1911 he was playing it on the Orpheum circuit in New York City, under the billing Paul Dickey & Company. Dickey plays a college freshman, hazed by three upper classmen and an alumnus in a badger game variant, who gets even with the aid of a young woman. The sole female role was first played by Emma Littlefield, but Dickey replaced her with Inez Plummer by April 1911. The Come Back was performed in vaudeville through March 1912.

The Ghost Breaker was still being shopped to various producers without success. Meanwhile, Charles W. Goddard had become romantically involved with Dickey's younger sister Ruth, a professional violinist. They were married in Chicago, during December 1911.

Paul Dickey & Company resumed playing The Come Back with an expanded cast of eight during September 1912. It was now considered a headliner act in vaudeville. It ran twenty minutes, and Dickey reportedly had a three-act version in preparation for the legitimate stage.

== Broadway: 1913-1916 ==
=== The Ghost Breaker ===
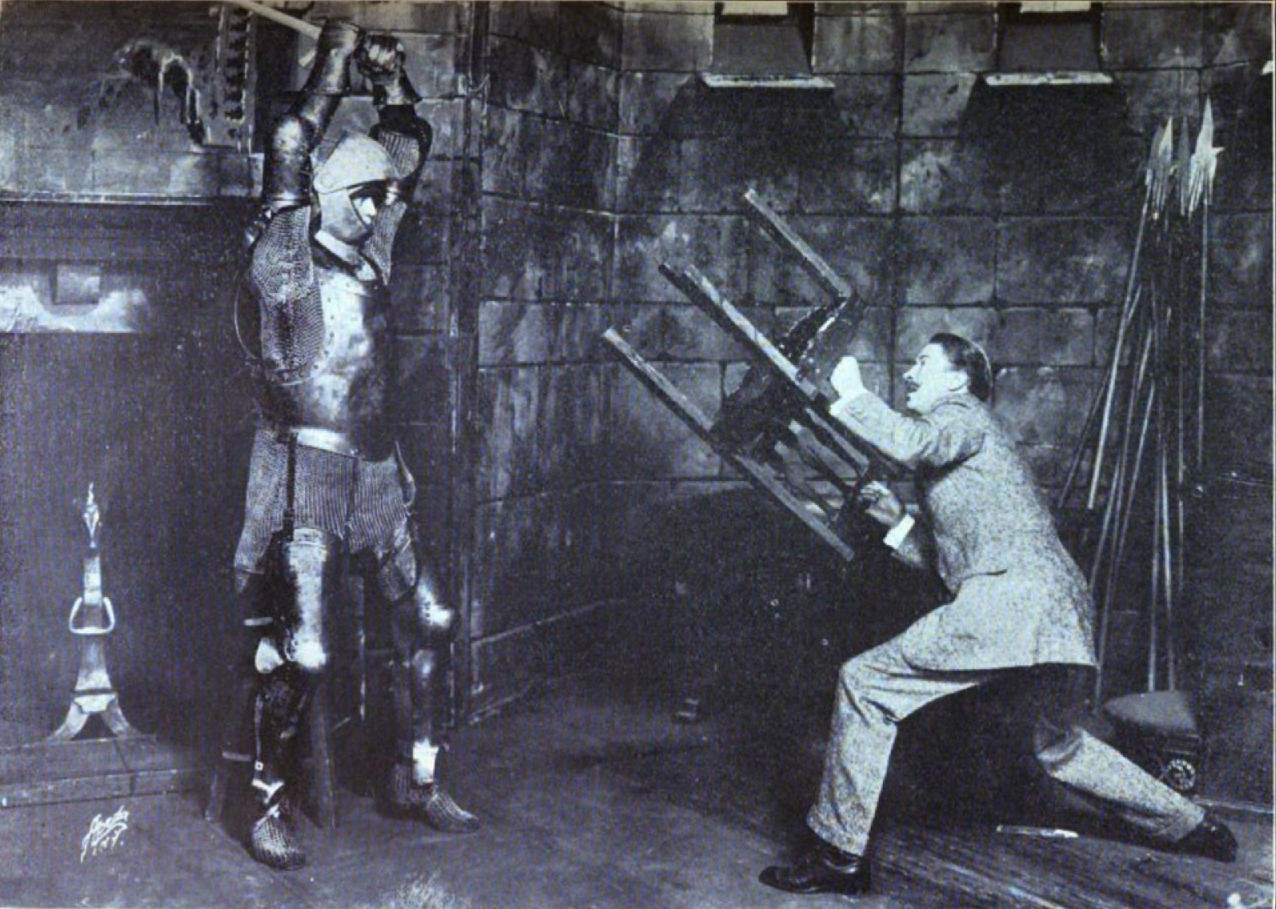

In October 1912 Goddard and Dickey sold The Ghost Breaker to Maurice S. Campbell, who had produced The Man from the Sea in 1910. He agreed to produce the play, only to find out that the Harris estate (Note: Harris had perished in the RMS Titanic sinking earlier that year, and his estate was now in the hands of his wife Renee, who survived the disaster.) had a lien on it. It took until December 1912 for the legalities to be settled, so Campbell could formally accept the play for production. The story concerns a Spanish princess who helps a Kentucky gentleman escape from the law in Manhattan, and he in turn helps rid her castle of a spirit. Dickey directed the production but didn't perform in it. The comedy was well-received by audiences, who held it open on Broadway for ten weeks, until contractual obligations of the star, H. B. Warner, forced it to close. It was later adapted for films in 1914, 1922, and 1940.

=== The Misleading Lady ===
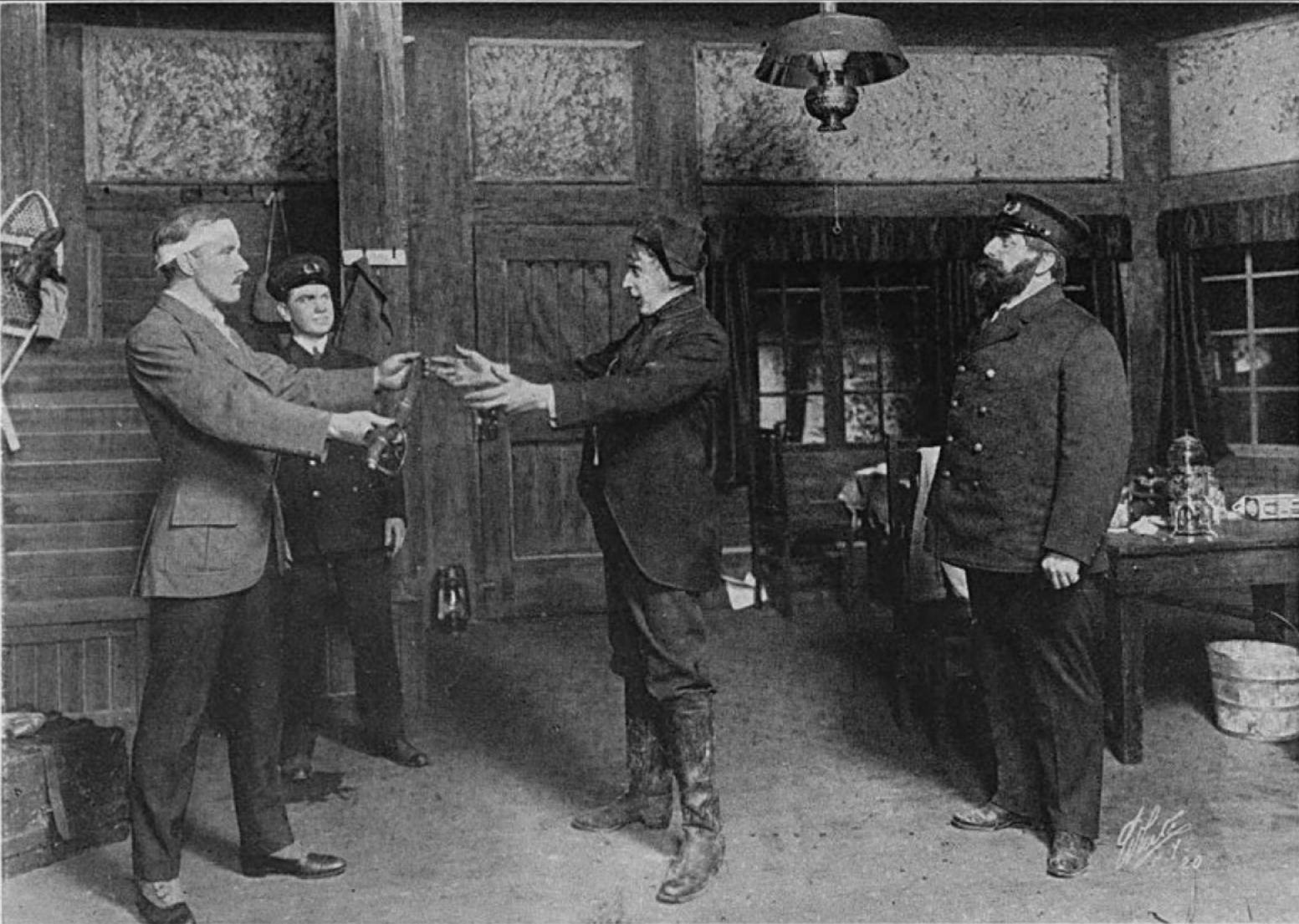

After their first Broadway success, Dickey and Goddard were presented with a challenge from William Harris Jr., who had taken over his older brother Henry's production company. The younger Harris had signed West Coast actor Lewis Stone and wanted a star vehicle for him. Stone preferred playing rough characters to drawing room types. The new play would be needed in a month's time, so Dickey and Goddard, helped by an idea from Ruth Dickey Goddard, worked day and night in shifts to write The Misleading Lady. The script was completed in time for rehearsals to begin in September. Once again, Dickey staged the play but didn't perform in it.

At the start of rehearsals an unknown actor named George Abbott stopped by the Hudson Theatre offices looking for work. He had come to New York a month earlier, was just about out of money and contemplating a career change. William Harris Jr. sent him down to the stage to see Dickey. Abbott later described Dickey as "a dynamic, athletic fellow with a hooked nose and bright eyes". He cast Abbott in a small part at first, then promoted him to a larger role the same day. The two former college athletes got along well; Abbott in his 1963 memoir referred to Dickey as "my good angel". During the tryout period for The Misleading Lady, when the train carrying the cast stopped at local stations, Dickey and Abbott would get out onto the platform to "hand wrestle or broad jump".

The Misleading Lady premiered on Broadway on November 25, 1913. Critical opinion was mixed about Frank Sylvester's "Boney", an escapee from an asylum who thinks he is Napoleon, (Note: This may be the earliest occurrence of what would become a widespread trope.) but the audiences loved it. By the time The Misleading Lady started its eleventh week on Broadway in February 1914, ticket sales were still running two months in advance. The production closed on May 2, 1914, after 198 performances. The production started on tour immediately afterwards. Like The Ghost Breaker, it was later adapted into motion pictures in 1916, 1920, and 1932.

=== Other plays ===
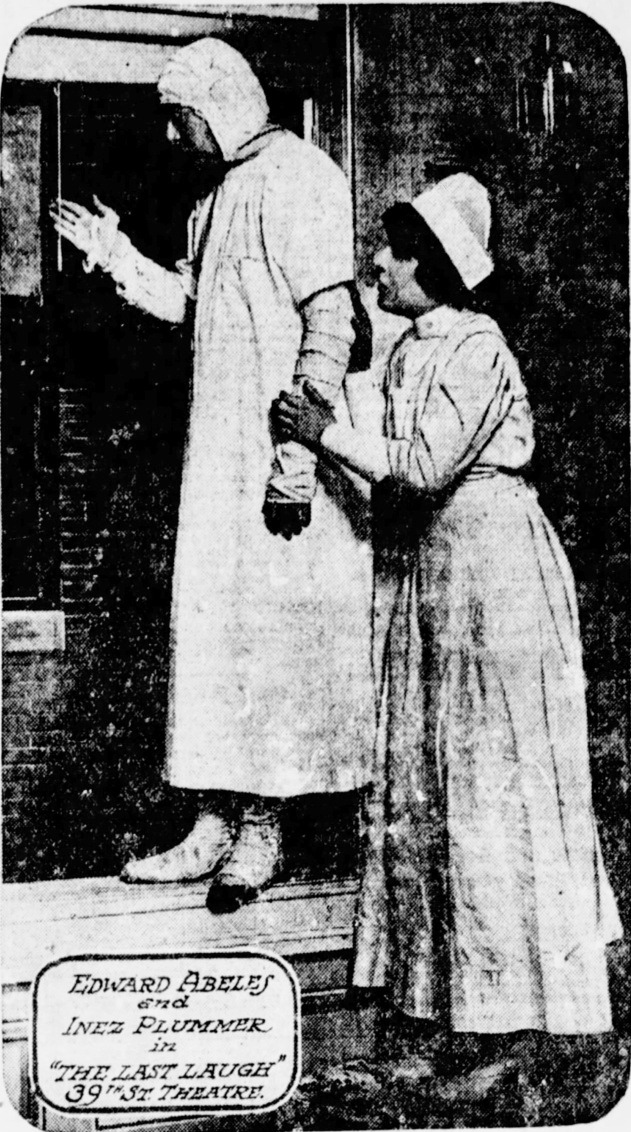

Dickey and Goddard sold The Last Laugh to the Shuberts; it received a Boston tryout in April 1914, but was withdrawn. The three-act comedy had one setting, a private laboratory owned by Dr. Bruce (Henry Harmon) who seeks to restore life to a "monster" of discarded body parts. His daughter Eugenia (Inez Plummer) and friends, fearing for his mental health if it doesn't work, replace the "monster" with a live volunteer (Edward Abeles) in disguise, not knowing the doctor is himself hoaxing them with his chauffeur in the monster costume. The play had its Broadway premiere on July 29, 1915, with Dickey again directing. Charles Darnton in The Evening World called it "Frankenstein turned into farce", but like other critics thought it had amusing moments after a tiresome first act. Three weeks after the opening, Dickey and Goddard incorporated a new scene into the third act. During the run of this play Dickey bought Inez Plummer's contract from the Shuberts. The Last Laugh finished its Broadway run on September 18, 1915, and went on tour starting in Buffalo.

Miss Information, which starred Elsie Janis, was originally titled The Missing Link. It was a three-act play with music rather than a musical, or as producer Charles Dillingham put in ads, "a little Comedy with a little Music". Dillingham had commissioned the work from Dickey and Goddard. Dickey's involvement was strictly as a writer; the play was staged by Robert Milton. It had tryouts at Rochester and Buffalo before it premiered on Broadway on October 5, 1915. The New York Times said it "is rattle-pated farce with trimmings, which begins with bad old melodrama and ends with good old vaudeville". Miss Information closed on November 13, 1915; there was no tour.

== Early film work and stage return ==
The New York Times reported that Dickey and Luther Reed of the New York Herald had left for Hollywood on December 14, 1915, to take up scenario writing with the Lasky Corporation. Two weeks later the New-York Tribune carried a story announcing Inez Plummer and Dickey were to marry. He accompanied a film crew to do location shooting in Santa Cruz, California, for The Trail of the Lonesome Pine during January 1916, though in what capacity is uncertain, since a local newspaper said the scenario for the picture had already been written by Jeanie MacPherson. Dickey is next heard of doing location shooting in the Mojave Desert with Wallace Reid and Cleo Ridgely for Under the Mask. During May 1916, Dickey, Jeanie MacPherson, Willard Mack, Margaret and Hector Turnbull were members of the Photodramatic department of Lasky, under William C. DeMille.

Dickey is next heard of as general stage master for all of William C. Harris' productions. He started by staging Arms and the Girl by Grant Stewart and Robert Baker for Broadway in September 1916. He then staged Lilac Time by Jane Cowl and Jane Murfin, which ran on Broadway from February thru July 1917.

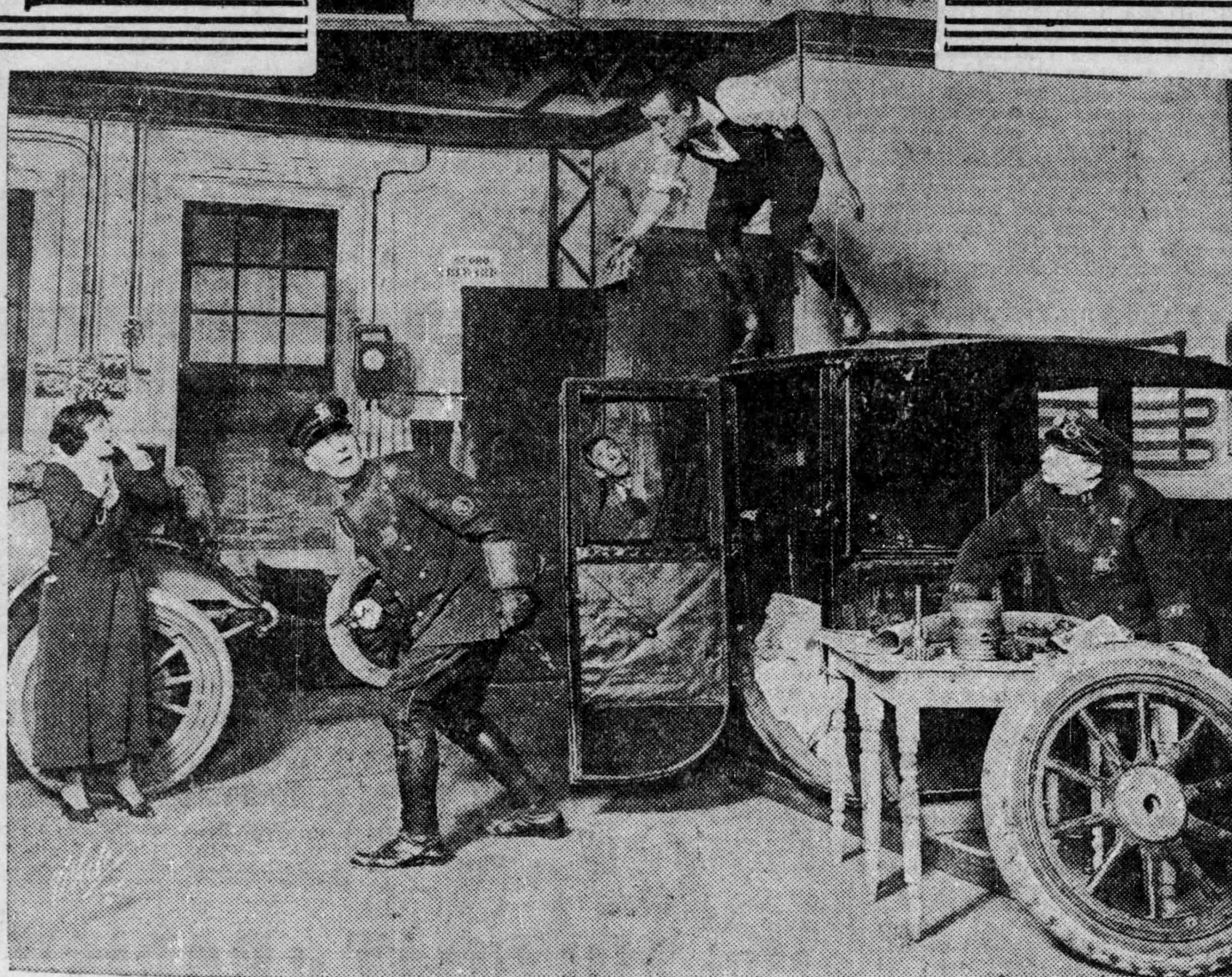

By March 1917, Dickey had resurrected his vaudeville troupe to perform his new one-act play The Lincoln Highwayman. A motoring enthusiast, Dickey built this story around the nation's first transcontinental highway for automobiles. Dickey played Jimmy Rucker, a man suspected of being the masked Lincoln Highwayman who robs motorists in California. Inez Plummer played a reporter, the only woman in the cast, which included George Abbott as a mechanic, with Frank Sylvester and Clay Boyd as policemen. The New York Times and the New-York Tribune both claimed it was a cut down version of Under Cover, a 1914 Broadway hit by Roi Cooper Megrue. It proved popular outside of Manhattan, with George Abbott praised for his comic mechanic. Dickey & Company performed The Lincoln Highwayman through January 1918.

== Aviation and military service ==
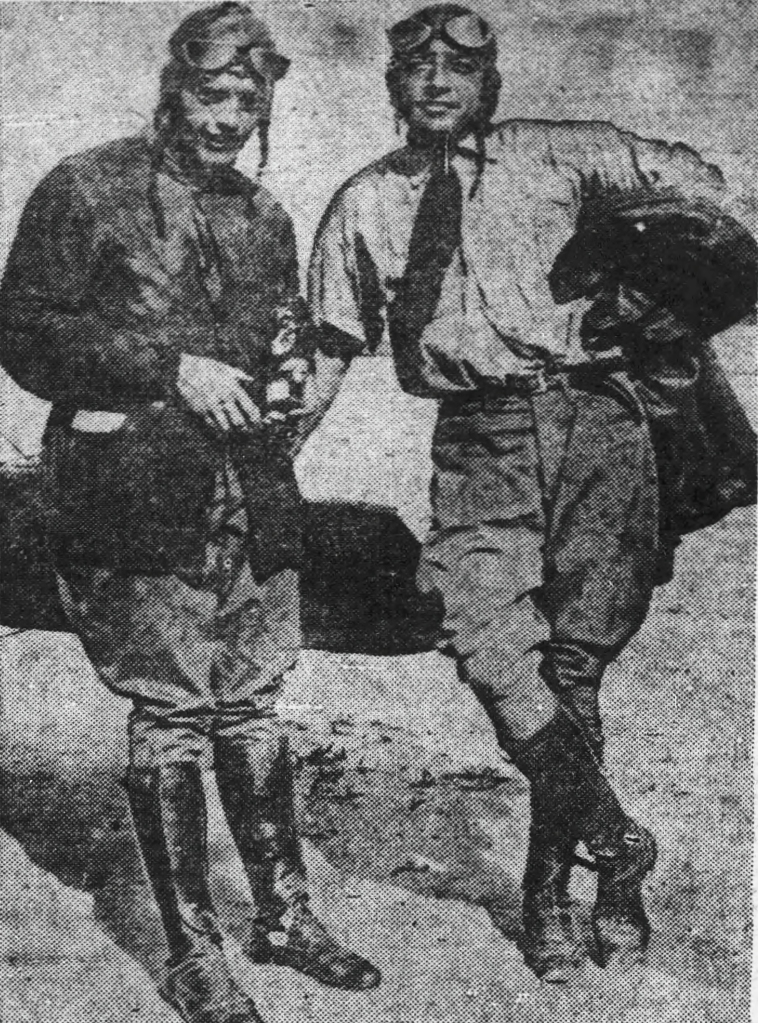

Dickey had learned to fly at the Curtis Flying School in Miami, Florida. He paired up with Joe Bennett of Curtis Engineering in April 1918 to demonstrate how minor maintenance could be carried out on airplane engines during flight. In front of an audience of USMC officers, the two piloted a Curtis aircraft up to 8000 feet then deliberately stalled the engine while in a "nose up" vertical position. As the plane fell, Dickey climbed onto its nose and swapped out an engine spark plug. The plane's engine was restarted in mid-air, and the craft landed safely.

Dickey enlisted in the USMC on May 16, 1918, and was given the rank of 2nd Lieutenant in the aviation section. In August 1918 he was promoted to 1st Lieutenant and deployed to France, with Marine Aviation Squadron One, which was assigned to the Allied Northern Bombing Group. While on a bombing raid over the U-boat base at Zeebrugge, another aircraft flying above his dropped a bomb that punched a hole in Dickey's left wing. The plane spiraled into the ground, but Dickey escaped serious injury. The incident sparked the title of Dickey and Goddard's fifth Broadway collaboration, The Broken Wing. Shortly after the Armistice, Dickey contracted Spanish influenza and was hospitalized in London. He returned to America in mid-December 1918, and received his discharge on January 7, 1919.

== Later stage and film work ==
Upon discharge, Dickey resumed touring in vaudeville with The Lincoln Highwayman. By February 1919, the ads on the Orpheum circuit for Paul Dickey & Co. had "including Inez Plummer" on a separate line. Plummer and Dickey were quietly married in June 1919, though the news didn't leak out until two months later.

=== The Broken Wing ===
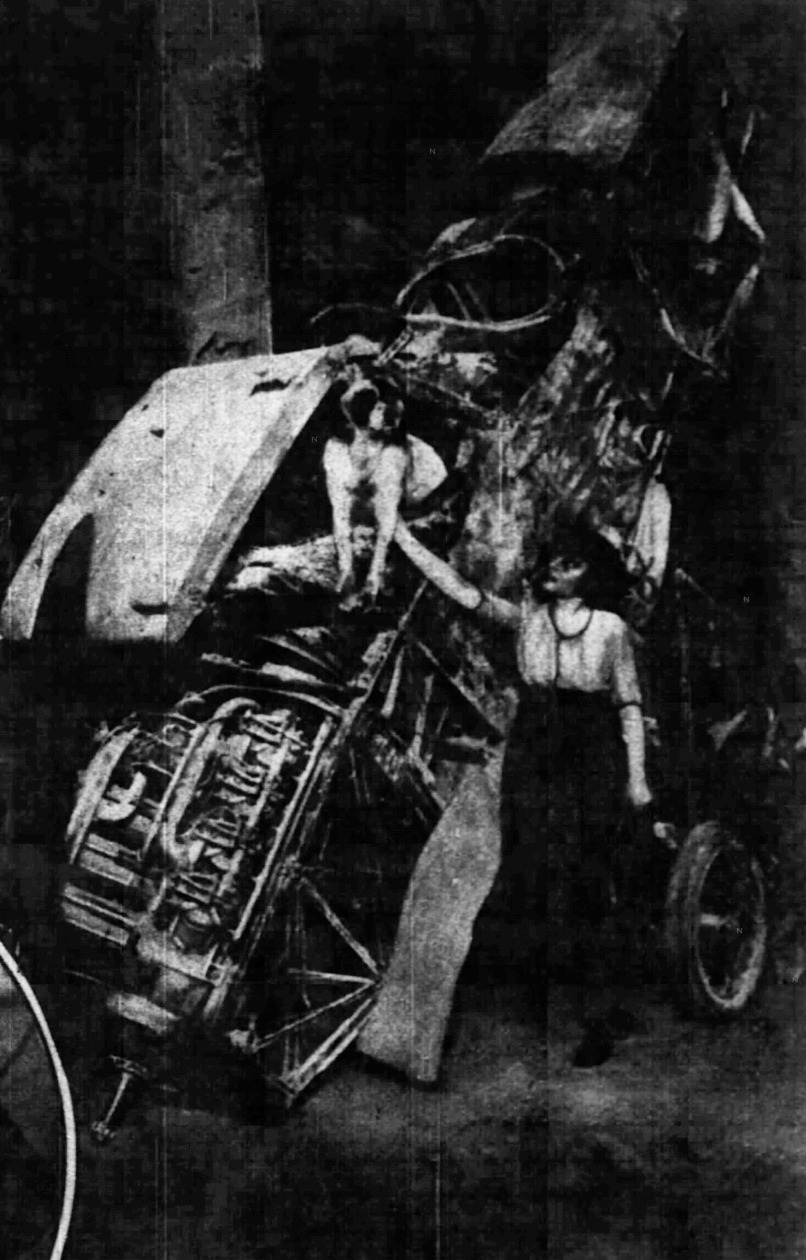

The Broken Wing was the fifth collaboration between Dickey and Goddard to reach Broadway. They would write at least one other play together, The Rainbow Bridge, which remained unproduced. The story revolves around a young Mexican woman, raised by a retired American sea captain, who is pursued by a Mexican Army officer turned bandit chief. She prays for a better husband and a plane obligingly crashes through the roof of her foster-father's adobe house, the injured American aviator becoming the focus of her matrimonial plans. The Broken Wing premiered on Broadway on November 29, 1920, and ran through July 2, 1921 for 253 performances. The popular appeal of the work, particularly the spectacular stage effect of the full-size airplane crashing into the house, was acknowledged by critics. Two very disparate reviewers, Alexander Woollcott and George Jean Nathan, both found Inez Plummer's performance underwhelming, with the former suggesting the play would have worked better with a Madame Butterfly ending.

=== Film role ===
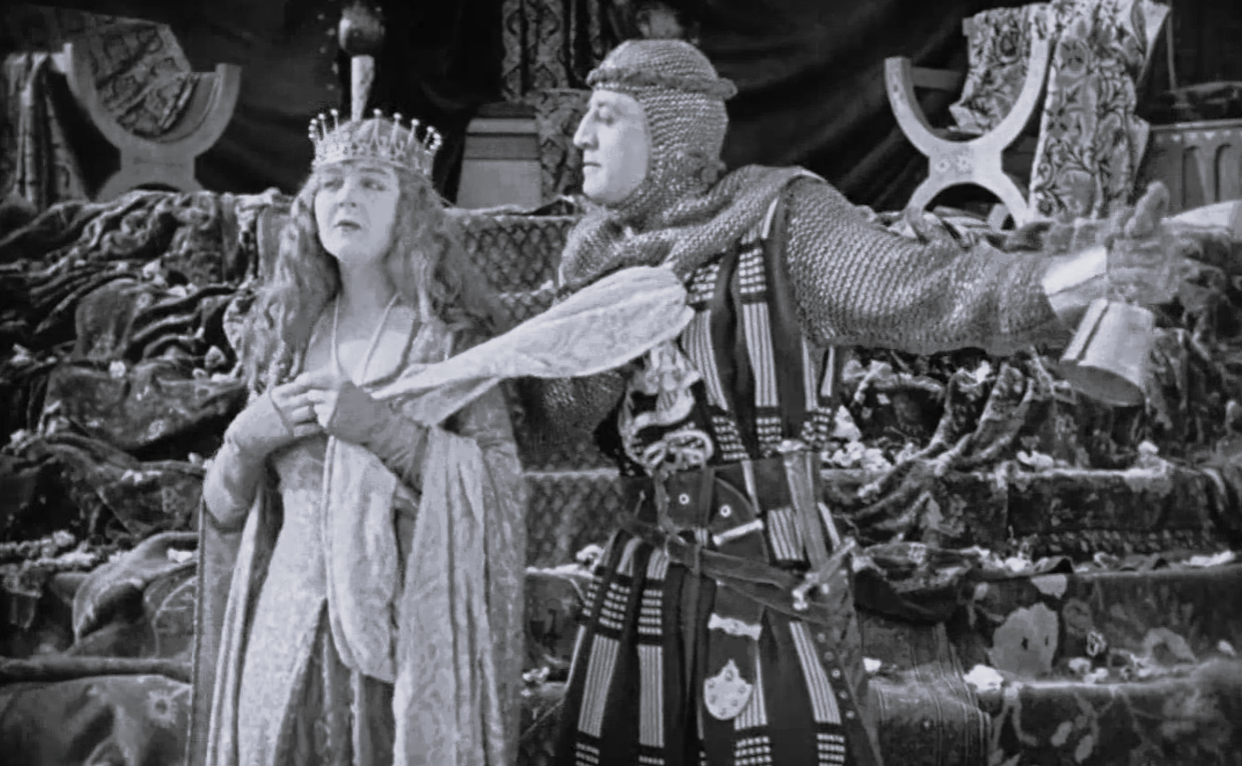

Douglas Fairbanks signed Paul Dickey to a leading film role in March 1922. This became Dickey's only known screen acting performance. The picture was based on Robin Hood stories and given the working title of The Spirit of Chivalry. Dickey played the arch-villain, Sir Guy of Gisbourne, to Fairbanks as Robin Hood. The first scene filmed was of Dickey as Sir Guy, killing a man in a tent during the Third Crusade, for which nine takes were shot. To keep in shape, Fairbanks had an outdoors obstacle course set up behind the studio at which he, Dickey, Jim Thorpe and other visitors to the set would race around every day. The film was released in late October 1922, with a New York premiere at the Lyric Theatre attended by Fairbanks, Mary Pickford, Dickey, and other stars. Paul Gallico gave it high marks and said it would be a picture that would last for years.

=== More stage work ===
Renee Harris announced in July 1922 that she would produce Lights Out, a parody of movie making by Dickey and Mann Page, a film scenarist. This same play, under the name of The Red Trail, had been tried out in 1921. Dickey was still in California when it was staged by Walter Wilson and debuted on Broadway on August 16, 1922. Lawrence Reamer said the writing had some engrossing material but the production dragged.

Bernard J. MacOwen wrote a melodrama called The Dust Heap about the Yukon, for the Alhambra Players in California. A producer liked it and hired Dickey to "doctor" it for Broadway. When it opened there on April 25, 1924, a first night reviewer commented: "It is still an invalid with little chance of recovery".

Dickey staged the book for Rose-Marie in August 1924. This operetta with music by Rudolf Friml and Herbert Stothart, had book and lyrics by Oscar Hammerstein II and Otto Harbach. It was produced by Arthur Hammerstein. Though Dickey's creative input was limited, it proved to be the most frequently cited work in many of his obituaries, along with an incorrect age at death.

== Final years and death ==
For the 1926-1927 Broadway season Dickey directed a revival of Rose-Marie, and a new musical, Yours Truly. The following season, he staged The Shannons of Broadway, which ran from September 1927 through June 1928. He also directed a flop, New York, in November 1927, and finished that season with another success, Excess Baggage.

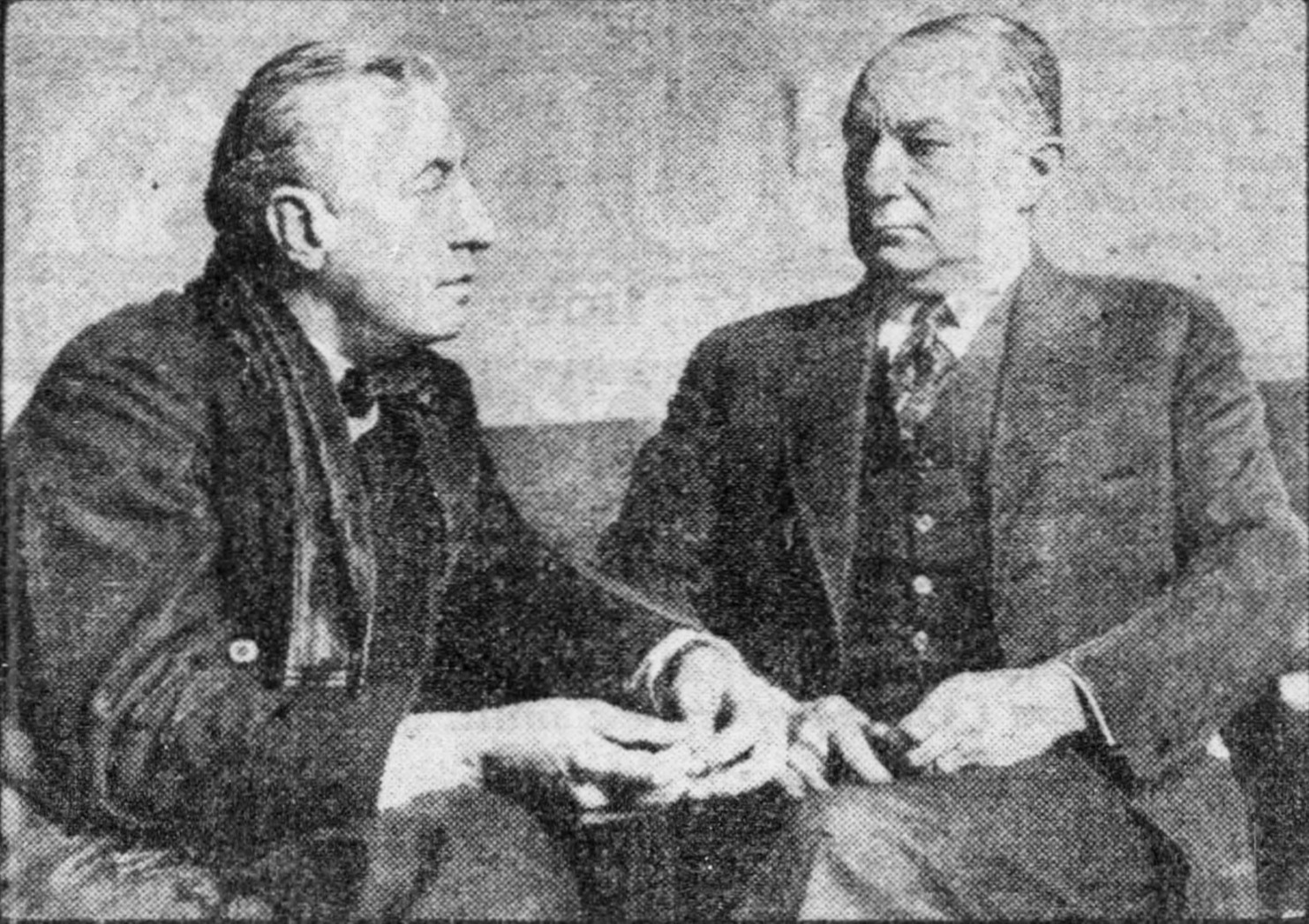

Dickey's wife, Inez Plummer filed for legal separation in January 1927. The Oakland Tribune gave a full page spread with photos to the filing, including the reasons Plummer gave for her action. Plummer named actress Ruth Shepley as the new interest in Dickey's life, which was denied by Shepley, her then husband, and Dickey. Plummer said Dickey had moved out of their home in Great Neck, New York and into the Lambs' Club several months earlier. At a hearing in Manhattan Supreme Court on February 16, 1927, Plummer claimed Dickey abandoned her in August 1926. She was awarded the legal separation and $50 a week permanent alimony.

Following his legal separation from Inez Plummer in February 1927, Dickey moved to Beverly Hills, California. His brother Basil Dickey, a film scenario writer, and sister Ruth, who had divorced Goddard and remarried, also lived in Los Angeles. Dickey worked on movie scripts and scenarios for several years. In October 1932 he went back to Manhattan to find a producer for his new play. He was treated for heart trouble while there, but hadn't seen a doctor recently when a chambermaid found him dead in his room at the Fraternities Club on January 8, 1933. He was survived by all three of his siblings, and his wife Inez Plummer. The funeral was held in New York on January 10, 1933, and the body was cremated.

== Works ==
=== Plays ===
- The Counterfeit Champion (1908) - One-act play for vaudeville, may not have been produced.
- The Ghost Breaker (1909) - Written with Charles W. Goddard from a story by Goddard.
- The Man from the Sea (1910) - One-act play for vaudeville, written with Charles W. Goddard.
- The Come Back (1911) - One-act play for vaudeville.
- The Misleading Lady (1913) - Written with Charles W. Goddard.
- The Last Laugh (1914) - Written with Charles W. Goddard
- The Fall of Louvain (1915) - One-act play for vaudeville.
- Miss Information (1915) - Written with Charles W. Goddard.
- The Lincoln Highwayman (1917) - One-act play for vaudeville.
- Retreat of the Germans (1917) - One-act play for vaudeville.
- The Broken Wing (1920) - Written with Charles W. Goddard.
- The Rainbow Bridge (1921) - Written with Charles W. Goddard.
- The Great Light (1921) - Written with Charles W. Goddard.
- Light's Out (1918) - Written by Mann Page as The Red Trail and revised by Dickey and Page in 1921.
- The Dust Heap (1924) - Written by Bernard J. McOwen, and "doctored" by Dickey.
- The Back Slapper (1924) - Written with Mann Page, originally known as Bunk.
- Through the Night (1930) - Written with Samuel Ruskin Golding

=== Screenplays/Scenarios ===
Because of their many collaborations, Dickey is sometimes erroneously credited as co-author with Charles W. Goddard of the movie serials The Perils of Pauline, The Exploits of Elaine, and The Mysteries of Myra. However, these works were written by Goddard without Dickey's involvement.

- The Man from the Sea (1914) - Original story co-written with Charles W. Goddard.
- The Ghost Breaker (1914) directed by Cecil B. DeMille
- The Lincoln Highwayman (1919) - Original story.
- The Ghost Breaker (1922)
- Fog Bound (1923) - Scenario, from story by Jack Bechdolt.
- Tin Gods (1926)
- Misleading Lady (1932)
- The Ghost Breakers (1940)

== Credits ==
=== Stage productions ===
By year of Dickey's first involvement.
| Year | Play | Role | Venue | Notes/Sources |
|---|---|---|---|---|
| 1906 | The Stage Surprise | (Celebrity impressions) | Vaudeville circuit | His act was also billed as "The Stage" and "A Vaudeville Surprise". |
| 1906 | Strongheart | Josh/Farley/Thorne | Touring company | Dickey would play three roles in this sports play during the year and a half he spent touring with it. |
| 1908 | Prince Karl | TBD | Hurtig & Seamon's | |
| 1908 | Pierre of the Plains | Jap Durkin | Touring company Hudson Theatre | Dickey's acrobatic death scene was the climax of the play. |
| 1909 | Sham | Tom Jaffray | Wallack's Theatre; Touring company | Dickey was leading man for Henrietta Crosman in this comedy. |
| 1910 | The Ghost Breaker | Warren Jarvis | Olentangy Park Theatre | One-week tryout was produced by Dickey and Goddard. |
| 1910 | The Man from the Seas | Carroll Brown | Olentangy Park Theatre; Vaudeville circuit | One-act play by Dickey has him as a drowned lover who reclaims his still-living bride. |
| 1911 | The Deserters | TBD | Touring company | Dickey replaced Orme Caldara in support of Helen Ware. |
| 1911 | The Come Back | Spin Williams | Orpheum circuit | A one-act play based on an event in Dickey's college days. |
| 1913 | The Ghost Breaker | (Director) | Lyceum Theatre | |
| 1913 | The Misleading Lady | (Director) | Fulton Theatre | |
| 1914 | The Last Laugh | (Director)/Dr. Francis (Note: Dickey understudied all male roles; he took over as Dr. Francis when an actor was hurt onstage one night.) | Cort Theatre (1914); 39th Street Theatre (1915) | Frankenstein farce had brief tryout in Boston during April 1914, before going to Broadway on July 29, 1915. |
| 1916 | Arms and the Girl | (Director) | Fulton Theatre | This was Dickey's first time staging a play he hadn't written. |
| 1917 | Lilac Time | (Director) | Theatre Republic | |
| 1917 | The Lincoln Highwayman | Jimmy Rucker | B. F. Keith Circuit | Besides acting, Dickey also wrote and directed this one-act play. |
| 1920 | Big Game | John St. John | Touring company | |
| 1924 | Rose-Marie | (Director) | Imperial Theatre | The longest running production with which Dickey was associated. |
| 1924 | The Back Slapper | (Producer) | Touring company | |
| 1927 | Rose-Marie | (Director) | | Revival of 1924 musical |
| 1927 | Yours Truly | (Director) | Touring company | |
| 1927 | The Shannons of Broadway | (Director) | Touring company | |
| 1927 | New York | (Director) | Touring company | |
| 1927 | Excess Baggage | (Director) | Touring company | |

=== Filmography ===
- The Love Mask (1916) 2nd unit director, working title Under the Mask.
- Robin Hood (1922) - Sir Guy of Gisbourne

== Bibliography ==
- Paul Dickey and Charles Goddard. The Ghost Breaker: A Melodramatic Farce in Four Acts. Samuel French, 1923.
- George Abbott. Mister Abbott. Random House, 1963.
