= Goodbye Broadway =

1938 film by Ray McCarey

- Directed by: Ray McCarey
- Written by: James Gleason (original play)
- Produced by: Edmund Grainger
- Cinematography: George Robinson
- Edited by: Maurice Wright
- Distributed by: Universal Pictures
- Release date: April 1, 1938
- Running time: 65 minutes
- Country: United States
- Language: English

Goodbye Broadway is a 1938 American comedy film. The movie is based on the play The Shannons of Broadway written by actor (and ex-vaudevillian) James Gleason. A previous film had been made of the play entitled The Shannons of Broadway.

== Plot ==
Molly and Pat Malloy, a married couple of celebrated vaudeville performers nearing retirement, arrive in a small Connecticut town to perform a show. After being insulted by the clerk at a run-down local hotel, they decide to buy the hotel, mainly so they can fire him. This frustrates a local realtor who had hoped to acquire the property himself. In retaliation, he places an advertisement in Variety claiming that the Malloys are offering free room and board to their old vaudeville friends. Soon, a number of eccentric performers arrive at the hotel, creating an unexpected and chaotic situation for the Malloys.

== Cast ==
- Alice Brady as Molly Malloy
- Charles Winninger as Pat Malloy
- Tom Brown as Chuck Bradford
- Dorothea Kent as Jeanne Carlyle
- Frank Jenks as Harry Clark
- Jed Prouty as J.A. Higgins
- Willie Best as Jughead
- Donald Meek as Iradius P. Oglethorpe
- Henry Roquemore as Henry Swanzey
- Dell Henderson as Cromwell
- unbilled players include Fern Emmett and Edward Gargan
