= The Misleading Lady (play) =

1913 play by Charles W. Goddard and Paul Dickey

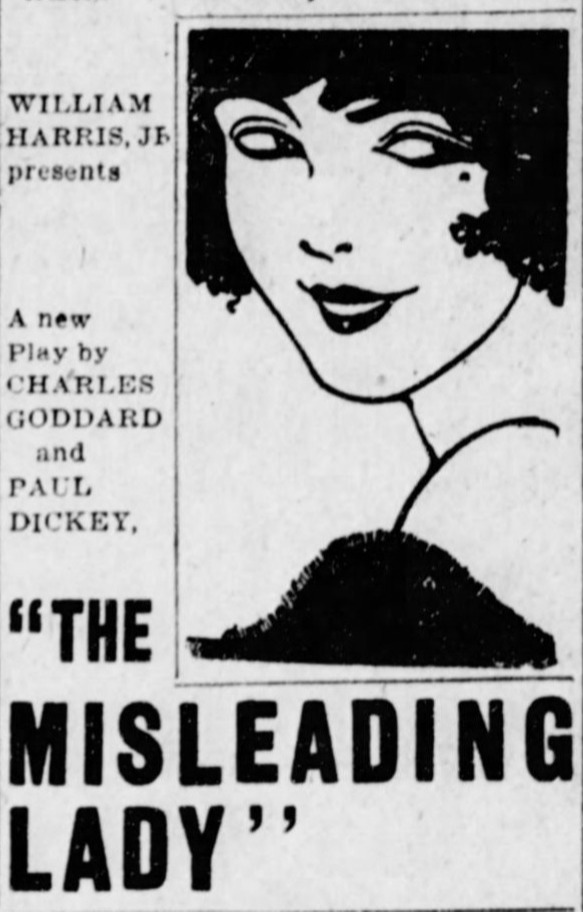
- Original language: English
- Written by: Charles W. Goddard and Paul Dickey
- Genre: Comedy, Farce
- Setting: Hudson River estate, Adirondacks bungalow

Premiere
- Date: November 25, 1913
- Place: Fulton Theatre
- Directed by: Paul Dickey

The Misleading Lady is a 1913 play by Charles W. Goddard and Paul Dickey. It is a farcical comedy in three acts, with two settings and sixteen characters. The story concerns an already engaged young woman, who for a wager convinces a man to propose in front of a secret audience, but who is then kidnapped by her victim after his public humiliation. The action of the play takes place during one night. The play popularized the trope of a mentally disturbed person identifying as Napoleon.

The play was first produced by William Harris Jr., starring Lewis Stone and Inez Buck. This production also marked the first Broadway appearance of George Abbott. Tryouts began in November 1913 at Atlantic City and two locales in Pennsylvania. The Broadway premiere came in late November 1913, with the run lasting to May 1914.

The play went on national tour, but was never revived on Broadway. The Misleading Lady served as the basis for a 1916 silent film, a 1915 novelization of the play, a 1920 silent film, a 1932 film, and a 1949 episode of Kraft Television Theatre.

== Characters ==
Lead

- Helen Steele is a young society woman from Baltimore, a would-be actress.
- Jack Craigen is an athletic young man, just back from four years in Patagonia. (Note: It is clear from the published play that the authors knew nothing of contemporary Patagonia, which they had Craigen describe as populated with cavemen cannibals.)

Supporting

- Stephen Weatherbee is a disappointed former suitor of Helen, an unintentional troublemaker.
- Henry Tracey is Helen's fiancé, a coal magnate from Pennsylvania, aggressive and armed.
- Boney is an escaped lunatic with the delusion he is the emperor Napoleon.

Featured

- Amy Foster is a young woman who encourages the wager.
- Grace Buchanan is a young woman, easily excited, fond of Stephen.
- Sidney Parker is an older stage producer, who makes a wager with Helen over a role in a play.
- Jane Wentworth is a young woman, Helen's friend, who nevertheless encourages the wager.
- Mrs. Cannell is the hostess of the estate party, who tries to stop the wager.
- Babe Merrill is a tipsy college student, trying to buy an island for his uncle.
- Spider Sanborn is another inebriated college student, friend to Babe. (Note: Newspaper cast lists from 1913 have this character as "Chesty" Sanborn.)
- John W. Cannell is an acquaintance of Jack Craigen who invited him to the estate.
- Keen Fitzpatrick is a reporter for The Star, who crashes the party looking for a story.
- Tim McMahon is an orderly from the nearby Sunny Vale insane asylum.
- Bill Fagan is another orderly from Sunny Vale.

Canine

- Bobbie is Jack's dog, kept chained in the bungalow where he lives.

Voice only

- Friends of Babe and Spider waiting in motor car.

== Synopsis ==
As they had done in The Ghost Breaker, the playwrights inserted a number of silent tableau after each act, where the curtain would open on a slightly changed scene, without any dialogue. The instructions for these are omitted here.

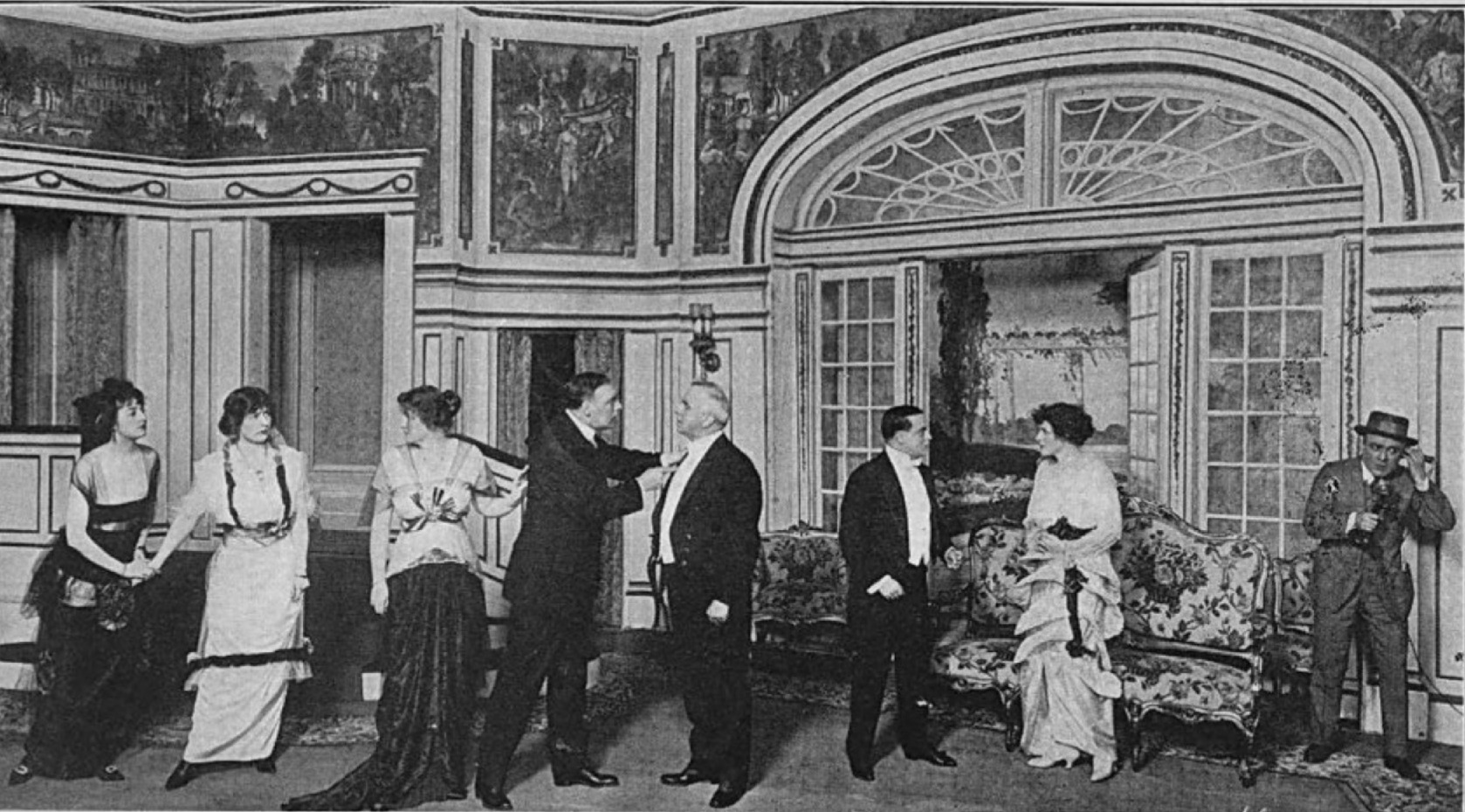

Act I (The country home of John Cannell on the upper Hudson River. Just before 10pm.) Amy, Grace, Jane, and Helen insist Parker keeps his side of their wager; Helen has spent five days enticing Jack into proposing. Offstage, Mrs. Cannell is singing and playing a piano. When Stephen dances in they scold him: he was supposed to keep Mrs. Cannell occupied. Shortly before 10pm, Helen sits while the others hide. Jack appears to ask Helen for her answer. She feigns confusion; he confesses his feelings. But Babe and Spider interrupt by knocking at the French doors. The tipsy duo are lost; Jack sets them straight, but is also asked by Babe whether any islands are for sale? They depart, and impatient Jack presses Helen, saying he loves her. He proposes and the others suddenly appear, the girls exclaiming Helen won the wager. Jack learns that Helen wanted a part in Parker's new play. He will now cast her as she has proven her male-luring skill. Outwardly, Jack maintains a cool demeanor. Their host, John W. Connell arrives with Helen's fiancé, Henry Tracey, who becomes upset at hearing what happened. Stephen exacerbates the situation by claiming everyone proposes to Helen. Uninvited reporter Keen Fitzpatrick, who has been covering a strike at Tracey's coal fields, adds to the confusion. The Connells apologize to Jack as he prepares to leave in his car. Helen asks everyone to wait while she speaks to him. They quarrel, and she suggests he should put a woman under a bell-jar and study her carefully, to repair his ignorance. Jack throws his overcoat over Helen's head and drags her away. Everyone is confused, having heard Helen's screams and the sound of Jack's car driving away. Tracey runs for his own car. Keen telephones in the story then drags Stephen out to pursue the couple. (Curtain)

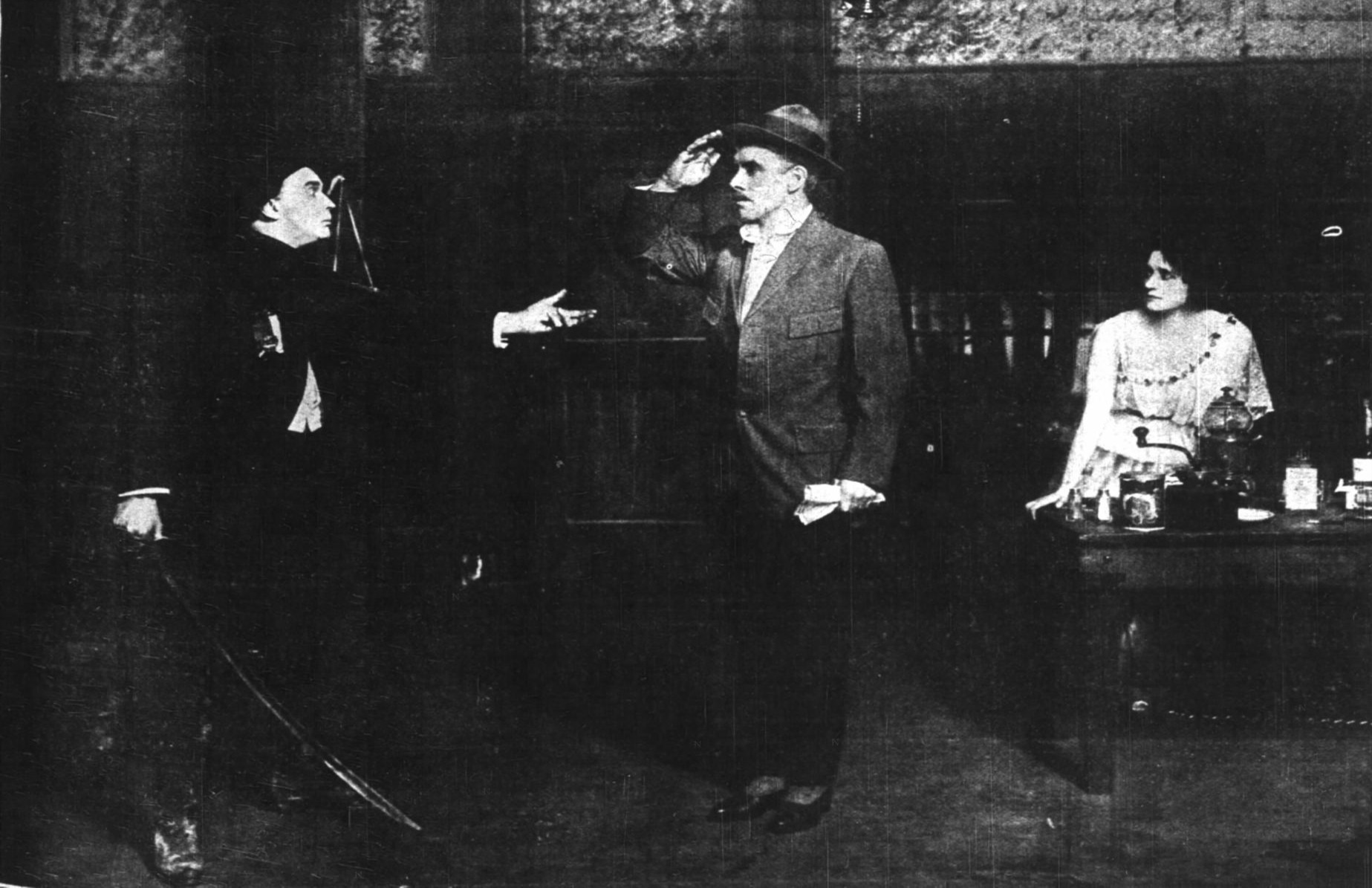

Act II (Jack's bungalow, "Eagle Lodge", in the Adirondacks, that night.) The society scene is followed by a two-person duel, between Helen and Jack. They tussle as he tries to wash her face and hands. The lodge has a telephone, with which Helen tries to summon help. Jack justifies kidnapping her by saying she committed larceny. She obtained property under false pretenses, by taking his heart. When she smashes a window with a chair, he unchains Bobbie and fastens the collar around Helen's ankle. Their verbal sparring is interrupted by Boney peeking in from a trap door in the ceiling. He is a harmless crank, suffering from a delusion he is Napoleon. Jack locks him in the upstairs bedroom then phones Sunny Vale to come get their ward. But while on the phone Keen cuts in on the party line to warn Jack of Tracey coming with a gun. When a motor car is heard approaching, Helen urges Jack to flee before Tracey comes. Jack locks her in a cabinet, only to find the visitors are Babe and Spider, going around in circles, and still looking for an island for Babe's uncle. Sending them off, Jack releases Helen from the cabinet. He claims she loves him, because she tried to get him to leave before Tracey arrived. He kisses her, but when Jack turns his back, Helen hits his head with the telephone. (Curtain)

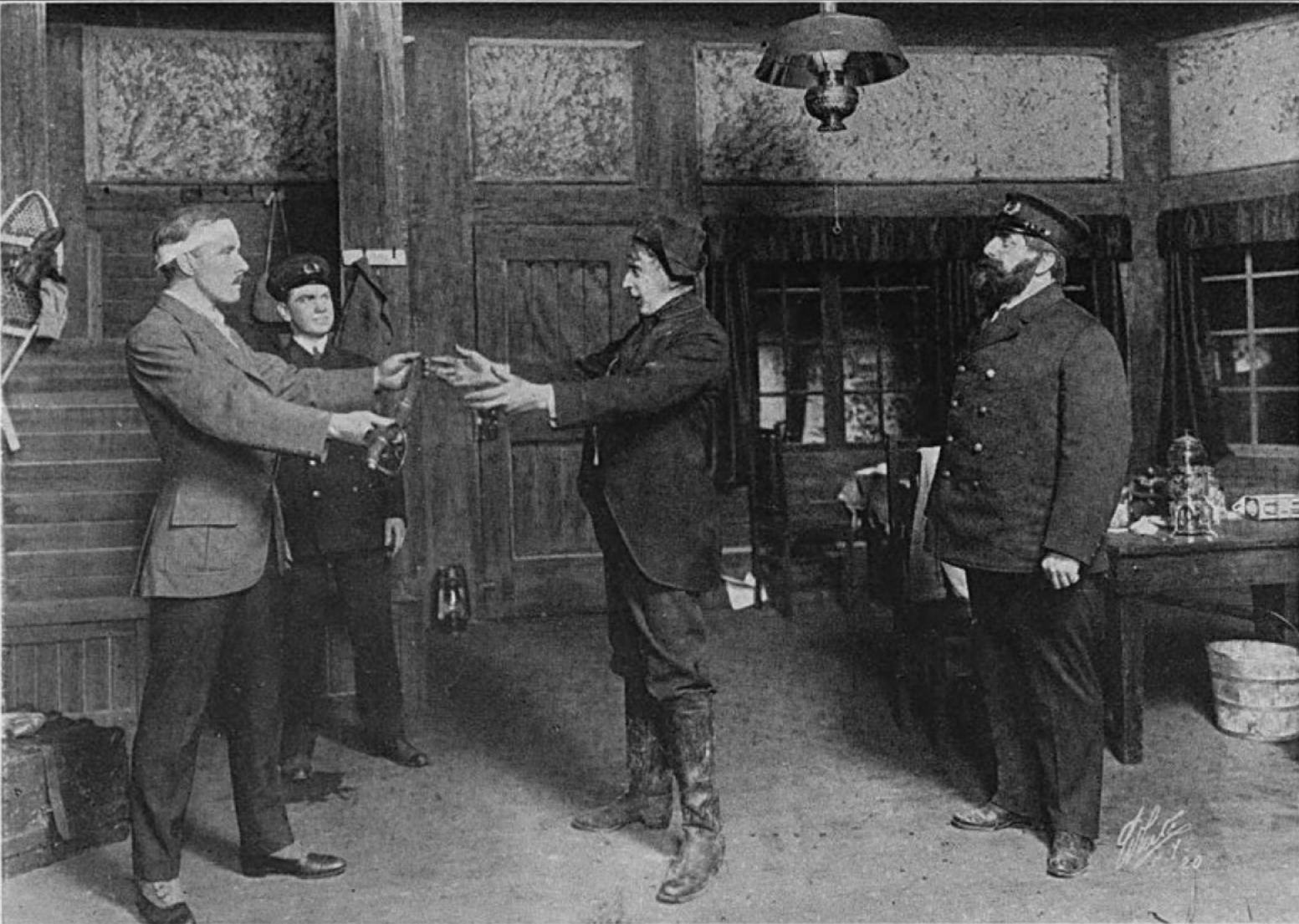

Act III (Same as Act II, a few hours later.) Jack enters the bungalow, his head bandaged with Helen's scarf. He reads a note she left on the door. He has Bobbie sniff her slipper then he and the dog set out to find her. Boney peeks through the trap door, and uses a fishing pole to retrieve the keys from the table. He is then heard unlocking the upstairs bedroom door. He comes downstairs, and spends some time trying to tie a rope to two different door knobs. It's too short, so he cuts it in two and tries again. He hides when Keen arrives. Keen hangs up the off-hook phone, only to find Boney has joined him. Assuming he is Jack, Keen tries to question him, but gets nowhere. Keen then places a call to his newspaper. Suddenly the sound of men singing La Marseillaise is heard outside. Tim and Bill enter the bungalow, saluting Boney. Confused, Keen hangs up. Jack now reappears. Tim tells Keen and Jack about Boney's mania, and how his college-age nephew inherited a fortune on the provision he buy his uncle an island for his "St. Helena". Jack asks Keen and the two orderlies to go into the bedroom so he can question Boney about Helen. He learns nothing and goes outside. Boney then ties the bedroom door knob to the nearby gun rack, trapping the three men inside. Stephen enters to behold Boney, who turns off the only lamp. Stephen yells for help, Bony disappears. Freed from the bedroom, Tim and Bill march off singing to attract Boney, while Keen and Stephen search for Helen. Tracey surprises Jack at gunpoint. He claims Helen is his wife, and accuses Jack of being a philanderer. Jack guesses he is lying and that Tracey thinks Helen is in earshot. Jack disarms Tracey, who also leaves to look for Helen. Tim and Bill return and take Boney away. Helen stumbles in, led by Bobbie, and is comforted by Jack. Stephen rushes in, but is rebuffed by Helen saying "I don't want to be rescued". (Curtain)

== Original production ==
=== Background ===
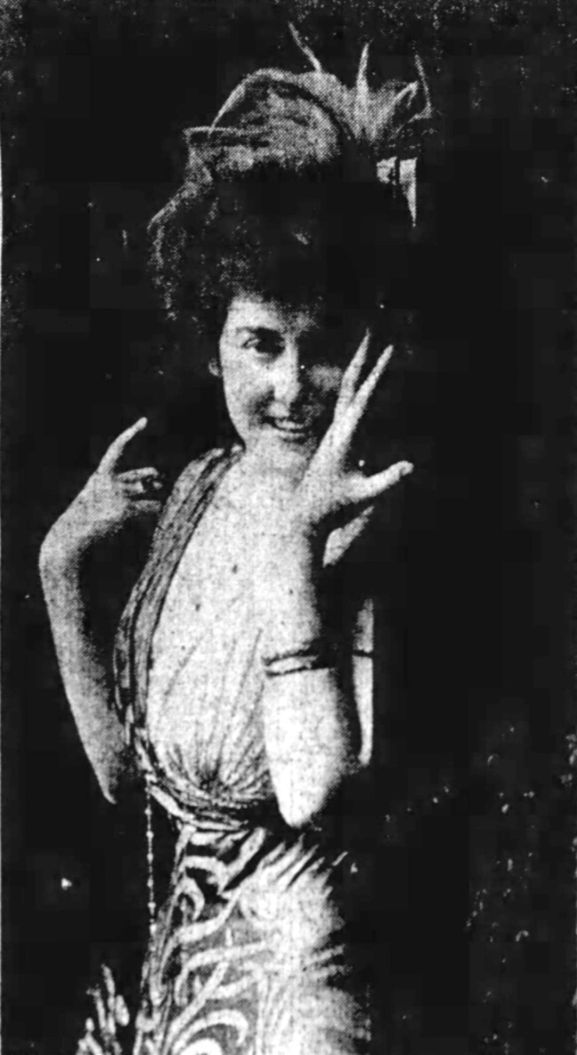
Inez Buck 1913

Paul Dickey and Charles W. Goddard had a success in Spring 1913 with their first collaboration, The Ghost Breaker. Originally optioned by producer Henry B. Harris, it was eventually produced independently. However, the Harris estate (Note: Harris had perished in the RMS Titanic sinking, and his estate was now in the hands of his wife Renee, who survived the disaster.) had a lien on it. The lien issue resolved, Dickey and Goddard kept up their contact with William Harris Jr., who had taken over his older brother Henry's production role. (Note: Henry B. Harris was 18 years older than his brother William Harris Jr.)

William Harris Jr. had signed acclaimed West Coast actor Lewis Stone and wanted a star vehicle for him. Stone, whose reputation and personal inclination were for rough-edged "alkali" characters, was reluctant to come East unless the part was of that type. This would also be Harris' first ever theatrical production. Goddard and Dickey stopped by Harris' office at the Hudson Theatre before going on vacation in August 1913. There they learned of his need for a play "by the end of the month". They obliged, coming up with the plot elements while travelling by auto with Mrs. Goddard (Note: She was Dickey's younger sister Ruth, and responsible for the play's central theme. When the trio stopped at a ferry crossing, they observed a couple standing by a motorcar, the man a hard-looking sort and the woman in a negligee. Ruth Dickey Goddard thought the woman was taking an awful chance by dressing like that. The playwrights seized on the idea of a caveman-type and a siren colliding.) to Dickey's camp at Bohners Lake, Wisconsin. They wrote the play in shifts, Dickey working nights and Goddard days. The manuscript was completed by September 1, 1913, and sent off to Harris.

Rehearsals were held at the Hudson Theatre, which was owned by the Harris estate. In his 1963 memoir, George Abbott recalled how in September 1913 he was an unemployed actor who had spent a fruitless month going round the theatrical agencies, when he decided to try the Harris office once more. William Harris Jr. himself interviewed Abbott briefly, then sent him to Paul Dickey on the theatre stage. Dickey cast Abbott, first as Sanborn, then "promoted" him to Babe Merrill the same day. Abbott said Harris Jr. and Dickey had innovative ideas, but William Harris Sr., bound by old fashioned dramatic rules, tried to interfere with Dickey's staging, claiming that "you can't have the leading man kiss the leading lady until the final curtain".

=== Cast ===
Cast from the tryouts through the Broadway run.
Role	Actor	Dates	Notes and sources
Helen Steele	Inez Buck	Nov 17, 1913 - May 2, 1914	Early press releases and tryout notices mistakenly credited her as "Buckingham".
Jack Craigen	Lewis Stone	Nov 17, 1913 - May 2, 1914	
Stephen Weatherbee	John Cumberland	Nov 17, 1913 - May 2, 1914	Cumberland wrote The Reformers, a comedy which Lewis Stone staged for Robert Graves Jr's company.
Henry Tracey	Robert Cain	Nov 17, 1913 - May 2, 1914	
Boney	Frank Sylvester	Nov 17, 1913 - May 2, 1914	
Amy Foster	Jane Quinn	Nov 17, 1913 - May 2, 1914	
Grace Buchanan	Frances Savage	Nov 17, 1913 - May 2, 1914	
Sidney Parker	Albert Sackett	Nov 17, 1913 - May 2, 1914	
Jane Wentworth	Gladys Wilson	Nov 17, 1913 - Dec 27, 1913	
Jane Wentworth	Grace Barbour	Dec 29, 1913 - May 2, 1914	
Mrs. Cannell	Alice Wilson	Nov 17, 1913 - May 2, 1914	
Babe Merrill	George Abbott	Nov 17, 1913 - May 2, 1914	
Spider Sanborn	Robert Graves Jr.	Nov 17, 1913 - May 2, 1914	Graves, a stock company producer, encouraged George Abbott's early playwriting, but Lewis Stone didn't.
John W. Cannell	William H. Sams	Nov 17, 1913 - May 2, 1914	
Keen Fitzpatrick	William Foran	Nov 17, 1913 - Nov 23, 1913	Foran was part of the original tryout cast but was not in the Broadway run.
Keen Fitzpatrick	Everett Butterfield	Nov 25, 1913 - May 2, 1914	
Tim McMahon	Albert Sackett	Nov 17, 1913 - May 2, 1914	Sackett doubled up as this character by wearing a fake beard.
Bill Fagan	Henry Thompson	Nov 17, 1913 - May 2, 1914	

=== Tryouts ===
The first tryout was held at Nixon's Apollo Theatre on the Boardwalk in Atlantic City on November 17, 1913. Local reviewers were agreed the play was more successful than the playwrights first work, The Ghost Breaker, and that Frank Sylvester as Boney carried off the acting honors.

The production went to the Orpheum Theatre in York, Pennsylvania on November 20, 1913. The local reviewer noted the rarity of a Broadway-bound tryout in that small city, commenting that "in theatrical terms, this latest venture of Mr. Harris was 'tried on the dog' in York... and 'the dog' liked it very well". The Misleading Lady concluded its tryouts with a two-day stand at the Grand Opera House in Wilkes-Barre, Pennsylvania. The local critic there called it a "melodramatic farce" and judged it "refreshing" and "should please the theatre-goers", but went against the critical grain by saying the character of Boney was "unnecessary and could be easily eliminated".

=== Broadway premiere and reception ===
The Misleading Lady had its Broadway premiere at the Fulton Theatre on November 25, 1913. The reviewer for The Brooklyn Daily Eagle said though Act I began badly, the second act raised the play's tenor from farce to comedy by the skillful acting of Lewis Stone and Inez Buck. They also complimented the stage effects of motor car headlights and rain. The New-York Tribune critic called it a "melodramatic farce" but agreed the deft playing of Lewis Stone and Inez Buck in the second act turned it to light comedy, amidst all the comings and goings.

The New York Times reviewer called The Misleading Lady a "theatrical crazy quilt" and labelled it a "cubist play" for its untraditional composition, but also said it was "very good fun". The critic for the Daily Standard Union agreed the story was "out of the ordinary" but well-appreciated by the large audience, with Lewis Stone and Inez Buck both "forced to respond to numerous curtain calls". The Brooklyn Citizen called it "one of the best plays that has been produced in Manhattan this season" and predicted it "should remain a long time on Broadway".

By the time The Misleading Lady started its eleventh week on Broadway in February 1914, ticket sales were still running two months in advance. A month later it had reached 118 performances.

=== Broadway closing ===
The Misleading Lady closed at the Fulton Theatre on May 2, 1914, after 198 performances, and started immediately on tour with a slightly different supporting cast, beginning at the Colonial Theatre in Boston on May 4, 1914.

== Adaptations ==
=== Film ===
- The Misleading Lady (1916) - Five-reel silent film from Essanay Studios, filmed in December 1915.
- The Misleading Lady (1920)
- The Misleading Lady (1932)

=== Literary ===
- The Misleading Lady (1915) Hearst International released this novelization, credited to Charles W. Goddard and Paul Dickey, in December 1915.

=== Television ===
- Kraft Television Theatre (1949) An episode titled "The Misleading Lady", attributed to Goddard and Dickey, was broadcast live on August 10, 1949. The leads were Patricia Jenkins, Mark Roberts, and Vaughan Taylor.

== Bibliography ==
- Charles W. Goddard and Paul Dickey. The Misleading Lady: A Play in Three Acts. Samuel French, 1929.
- George Abbott. Mister Abbott. Random House, 1963.
