= Charles Goddard (playwright) =

American journalist, playwright, and screenwriter 1886-1933

Charles W. Goddard
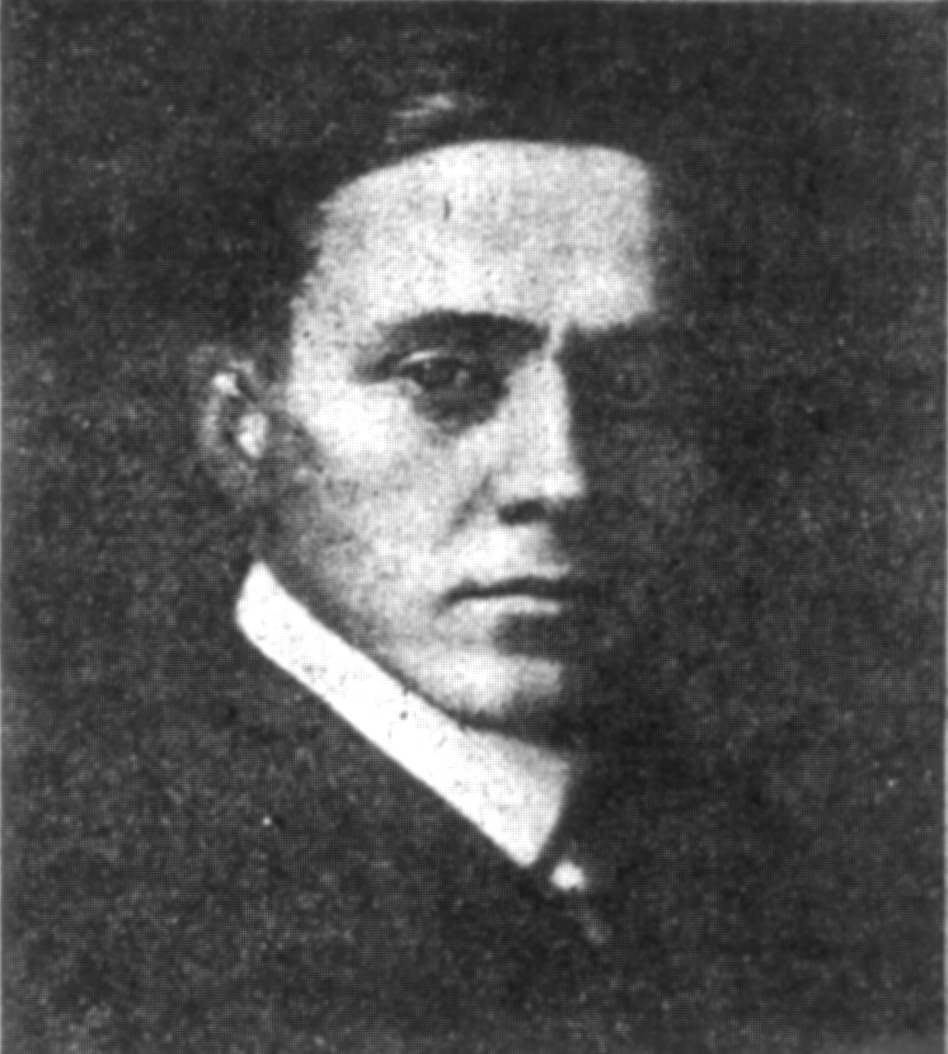
- Charles W. Goddard 1920
- Born: Charles William Goddard; November 26, 1879; Portland, Maine, U.S.
- Died: January 11, 1951 (aged 71); Miami, Florida, U.S.
- Education: Dartmouth College
- Occupations: Journalist, Playwright, Author, Screenwriter
- Years active: 1903 - 1943
- Known for: The Perils of Pauline, The Exploits of Elaine
- Spouse: Ruth Dickey (m. 1911; div. 1925)
- Relatives: Paul Dickey (brother-in-law); Basil Dickey (brother-in-law); Anson Morrill (grandfather); Lot Morrill (granduncle)

Charles William Goddard (November 26, 1879 – January 11, 1951) was an American journalist, playwright, author, and screenwriter. From 1913 through 1921 he was widely known for the Broadway plays he co-authored with Paul Dickey, but by his death the silent movie serial he wrote for actress Pearl White, The Perils of Pauline, was better remembered.

== Early years ==
Goddard was born November 26, 1879, in Portland, Maine to Charles W. Goddard and Rowena C. Morrill Goddard. He was the youngest of seven children for his father's second marriage. His father was Postmaster for Portland and a former US District judge. His grandfather Anson Morrill had been Governor of Maine, while his granduncle Lot Morrill had also been Governor, United States Senator from Maine, and Secretary of the Treasury under Ulysses S. Grant. Goddard's father died when he was nine-years-old. His mother and sisters were in Europe at the time, so his three older brothers cared for him until they returned a year later. Goddard graduated from Dartmouth College in 1902, and went to work on The Boston Post in 1903.

Goddard started at a salary of $8 a week. Many years later he told an interviewer he wasn't worth that much at first, but "the editors were so tough they beat a lot of newspapering into my head in the shortest possible time". Goddard himself featured in a newspaper story when he chased down a thief who had stolen his colleague's overcoat. From the Post, he joined the New York American. He was an early enthusiast for motorcycles, and was ticketed by Brooklyn police in 1907 for racing one against a motorcar at 25 mph on Ocean Parkway.

== Playwriting ==
Goddard clashed with another young fellow over a room in a Manhattan 46th Street boarding house they both claimed. This was actor Paul Dickey from Chicago. After a night arguing, they struck up a friendship. Dickey was impressed with the dramatic potential of a scenario Goddard had written called The Ghost Breaker. They would spend several months expanding it to a four-act "melodramatic farce". They were able to sell it to Henry B. Harris in 1909, but it remained unproduced until 1913, when Maurice S. Campbell had The Ghost Breaker staged on Broadway.

Goddard and Dickey's first collaboration to be performed widely was a one-act play for vaudeville called The Man from the Sea. Dickey performed in this starting in 1910 on the Orpheum circuit. Goddard became romantically involved with Dickey's younger sister Ruth, a professional violinist. They were married in Chicago, during December 1911.

The Ghost Breaker was a minor success, followed by an even bigger one, The Misleading Lady for the 1913-1914 Broadway season. The team of Dickey and Goddard would write three more plays that were produced for Broadway: The Last Laugh (1915), a Frankenstein parody; Miss Information (1915), a commissioned vehicle for Elsie Janis; and most successful of all, The Broken Wing (1920).

== Screenwriting ==
With two successful Broadway plays to his reputation in 1913, Goddard found himself in a conference with William Randolph Hearst "who had the notion of making a continued moving picture". Hearst asked for "a complete outline of all the chapters by the next day." Goddard obliged and was hired to write The Perils of Pauline. Goddard said Hearst named the serial, which was a Hearst-Pathé joint venture, and was involved in plot details.

Goddard also adapted a number of his stage works to film, and co-wrote other serials, such as The Exploits of Elaine, which has been selected for preservation in the United States National Film Registry. He said in 1948 that he never understood why The Perils of Pauline remained famous when he had so little time to put effort into writing it, while other serials which he labored over had become obscure.

== Later years and death ==
From 1923 on Goddard was a staff writer for The American Weekly, a magazine insert for Sunday newspapers. His last known article for it was written in 1943, and from later interviews it appears he had retired, spending part of the year in Asheville, North Carolina and winters in Miami.

Goddard died at his home in Miami, Florida on January 11, 1951. He was unmarried at the time and survived by his sisters. Obituaries put out by the United Press (UP) and Associated Press (AP) wire services mentioned only his movie serials and journalism. More extensive obituaries were published by Maine newspapers. Goddard was interred in Evergreen Cemetery in Portland, Maine.

A reporter for a Rochester, New York newspaper, writing from the standpoint of those who grew up watching the serials, contrasted the death of the unknown Goddard with that a day earlier of the celebrated Sinclair Lewis. "Somehow we can't recall the name of the principal character of Main Street, but we remember exactly what happened to the villain in the 13th installment of The Hooded Terror."

== Works ==
=== Plays ===
- The Ghost Breaker (1909) - Written with Paul Dickey, from a story by Goddard.
- The Man From the Sea (1910) - One-act play for vaudeville, written with Paul Dickey.
- The Misleading Lady (1913) - Written with Paul Dickey.
- The Last Laugh (1915) - Written with Paul Dickey.
- Miss Information (1915) - Written with Paul Dickey.
- The Broken Wing (1920) - Written with Paul Dickey.
- The Rainbow Bridge (1921) - Not produced, written with Paul Dickey.
- The Great Light (1921) - Not produced, written with Paul Dickey.

=== Scenarios/Screenplays ===
- The Perils of Pauline (1914)
- The Exploits of Elaine (1914)
- The Ghost Breaker (1914)
- The New Adventures of J. Rufus Wallingford (1915)
- The Goddess (1915)
- Hearts of Three (1916; later novelized by Jack London)
- The Misleading Lady (1916)
- The Mysteries of Myra (1916)
- The Hidden Hand (1917)
- Patria (1917)
- The Lightning Raider (1919)
- The Hope Diamond Mystery (1921)
- The Broken Wing (1932)
