= The Ghost Breaker =

The Ghost Breaker may refer to:

- The Ghost Breaker (play), a 1909 play by Paul Dickey and Charles W. Goddard
- The Ghost Breaker (1914 film), a 1914 American silent drama film, adapted from the play The Ghost Breaker
- The Ghost Breaker (1922 film), a 1922 American silent comedy horror film, also adapted from the play

== See also ==
- The Ghost Breakers, a 1940 comedy film, also adapted from the play
- Scared Stiff (1953 film), a 1953 American musical comedy film, also adapted from the play
