= Bement =

Bement may refer to:

== People ==
- Alon Bement (1876–1954), an American artist, arts administrator, author, and teacher.
- Arden L. Bement Jr. (born 1932), director of the U.S. National Science Foundation
- Linda Bement (1942–2018), Miss Universe, 1960

== Places ==
- Bement, Illinois, United States
