= Katherine Emmet =

American actress and director (1878–1960)

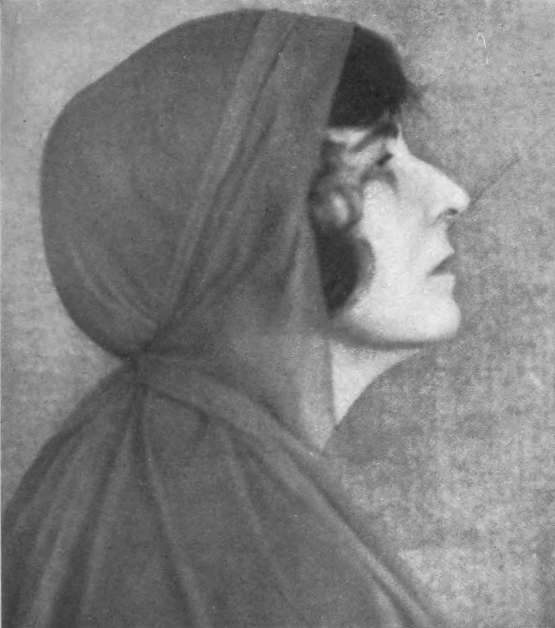
- Katherine Emmet, from a 1918 publication
- Born: March 13, 1878; San Francisco, California, U.S.
- Died: June 6, 1960 (aged 82); New York City, New York
- Other names: Katherine Emmett, Kate Emmett, Katherine Emmet Bement (after marriage)
- Occupations: Actress, director
- Years active: 1906–1954
- Known for: created part of Amelia Tilford in The Children's Hour
- Spouse: Alon Bement (1914–1954; his death)

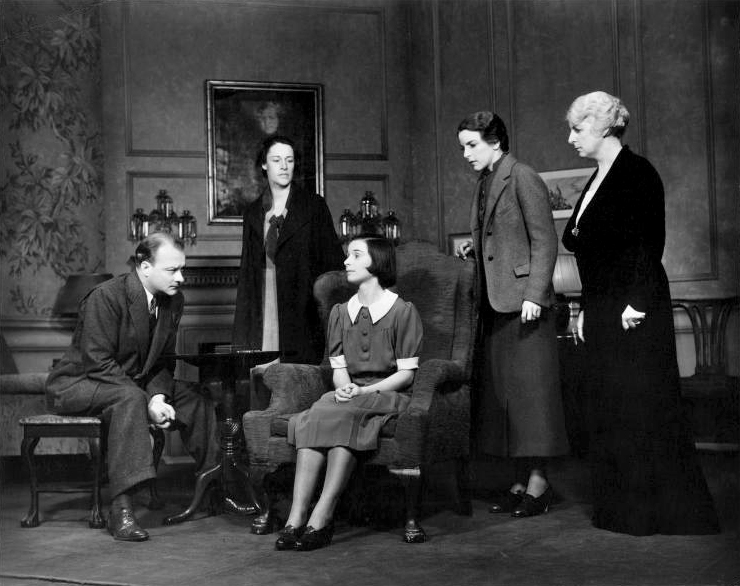
A scene from The Children's Hour (1934), featuring, from left to right, Robert Keith, Anne Revere, Florence McGee, Katherine Emery, and Katherine Emmet

Katherine Emmet (March 13, 1878 – June 6, 1960) was an American actress on stage, in film, and in television, and a director of radio plays.

== Early life ==
Emmet was born in San Francisco, California. Her mother Harriet H. Hubbell was a physician in that city. Her father was said to be a descendant of Betsy Ross. Emmet attended Stanford University, with further studies in France and Monte Carlo.

== Career ==
=== Acting ===
Emmet had a long and varied career on stage in New York. Her Broadway appearances included roles in Matilda (1906–1907), A Woman of Impulse (1909), The Bridge (1909), The Affairs of Anatol (1912), The Ghost Breaker (1913), Help Wanted (1914), Polygamy (1914–1915), Any House (1916), The Gypsy Trail (1917–1918), A Doll's House (1918), Penrod (1918), The Marquis de Priola (1919), Moonlight and Honeysuckle (1919), The Laughing Lady (1923), The New Englander (1924), Thoroughbreds (1924), Hangman's House (1926), Paolo and Francesca (1929), Jenny (1929–1930), A Widow in Green (1931), We, the People (1933), The Children's Hour (1934–1936, and again in revival 1952–1953), Ring Around Elizabeth (1941), Guest in the House (1942), and Pygmalion (1945–1946).

Film work by Emmet included roles in Cupid's Caprice (1914, short), The Rube (1914, short), Little Miss Bountiful (1914, short), Peter's Relations (1914, short), Paying the Piper (1921, now lost), Orphans of the Storm (1921), The Hole in the Wall (1929), and The Night Angel (1931). On television, she appeared in episodes of Studio One in Hollywood (1950–1952), Campbell Summer Soundstage (1953), and Inner Sanctum (1954).

=== Directing, writing, and acting for radio ===
On radio, Emmet was known for adapting, directing, and sometimes acting in Shakespeare plays for a weekly program on WEAF in New York. "Audiences today have tabloid minds," she explained in 1927, "and, whether we like it or not, we must cut the classics to a length that they will tolerate, if we want them to be interested at all." She also directed Sheridan's The School for Scandal for the same radio program. She was later in the cast of radio soap operas, including Our Gal Sunday (1937–1955) and Front Page Farrell (1941–1942).

=== Other activities ===
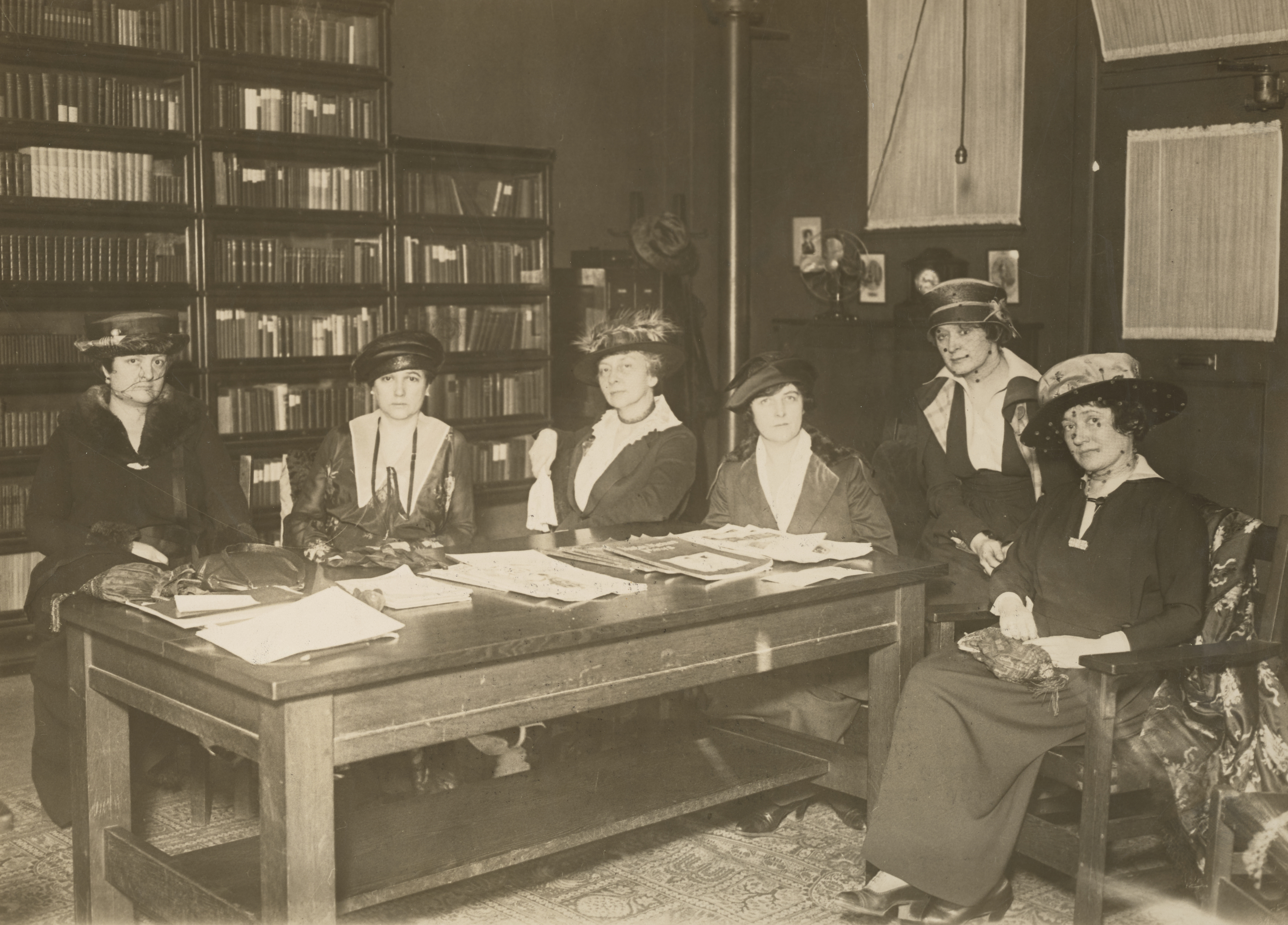
Stage stars discuss plans for great third Liberty Loan Drive; from left to right, Mrs. Joseph Grismer, Julia Arthur, Rachel Crothers, Katherine Emmet, Chairman; Mary Cecil, and Jessie Busley

Emmet called herself "a good suffragette", but "non-militant — don't forget to put the non-militant part in", she reminded a reporter in 1913. She owned a dairy farm in California's San Joaquin Valley in the 1910s. During World War I, she sold Liberty Bonds, and served on the board of Stage Women's War Relief. She and Edith Wynne Matthison resigned from the board of directors at the Actors' Theatre in New York in 1928, in a contract dispute. The following year, she gave testimony at the state legislature against Sunday performances in New York theatres.

== Personal life ==
"If I say I am not married", Emmet told a reporter asking about her personal life in 1913, "people will wonder why I am an old maid. So I shall not tell you." She was married in 1914, to artist and educator Alon Bement, who was an early mentor of Georgia O'Keeffe. She was widowed in 1954, and she died in 1960, aged 82 years, in New York City.
