= Princes Hall =

Theatre in Aldershot, England

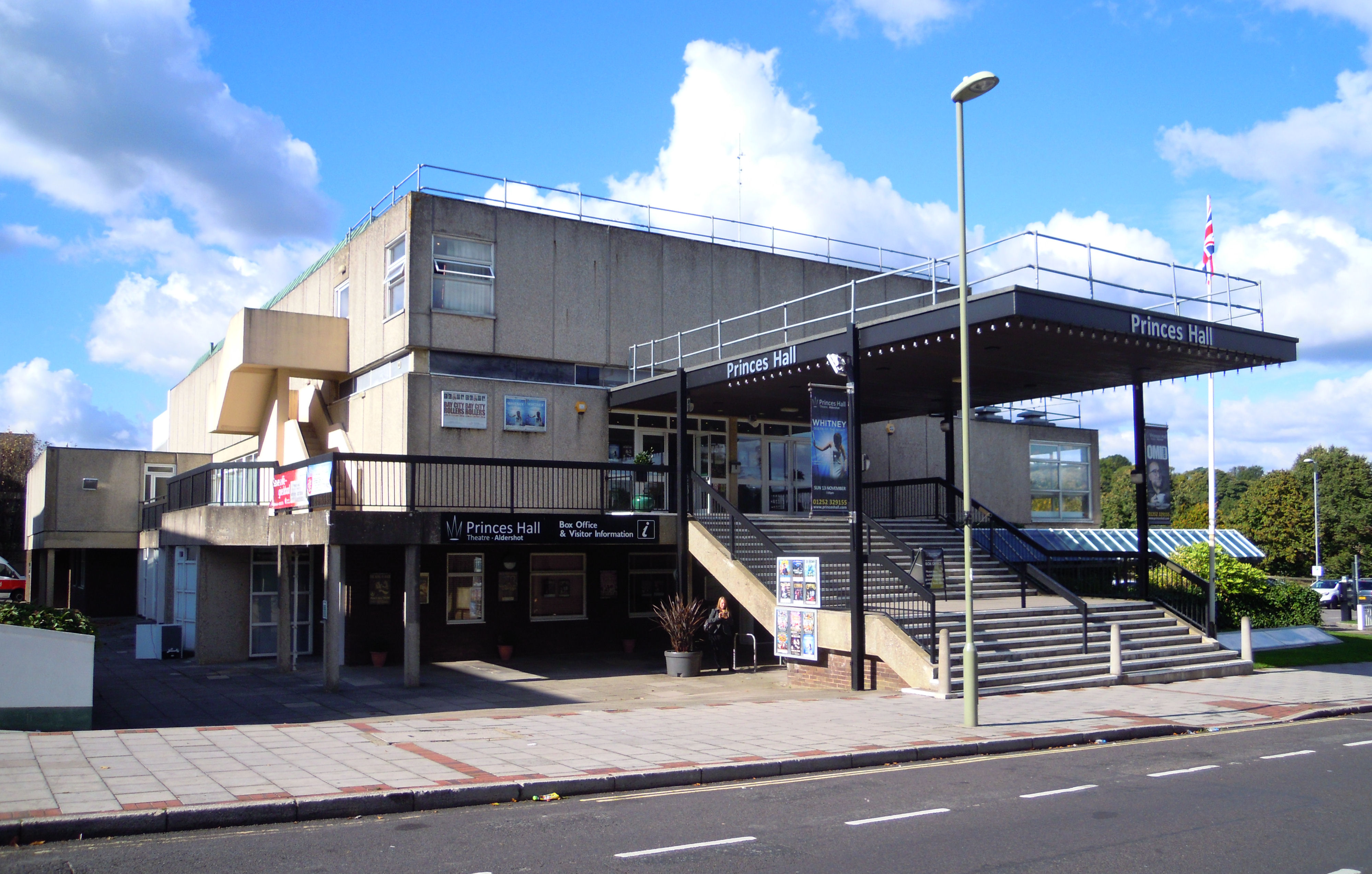
- Princes Hall
- Interactive map of Princes Hall
- Address: Princes Way, Aldershot; Aldershot
- Coordinates: 51.250554°N 0.768056°W
- Owner: Rushmoor Borough Council
- Capacity: 590 (seated)
- Type: Theatre

Construction
- Opened: 1972
- Years active: 1972–present

Website
- http://www.princeshall.com

The Princes Hall in Aldershot, England is a 600-seat theatre / receiving house which presents a varied programme of music, ballet, comedy, pantomime.

An additional three function rooms named the Princes Suite, the Edinburgh Suite and the Tichborne Suite (after the prominent Aldershot family) are available for hire for conference, parties and weddings. The Theatre is owned and managed by Rushmoor Borough Council.

The Princes Hall also hosted a vaccination centre during the Covid-19 pandemic.

The Princes Hall was awarded the Devereux Cup in 2008 for its contribution to the arts.

The Princes Hall website www.princeshall.com won Best Recreation or Tourism Website at the 2008 Hantsweb Awards

== Background ==
Prince Philip opening the Princes Hall in 1973

Commissioned by Rushmoor Borough Council as a civic hall after the demolition of the town's Theatre Royal in 1959 and the Hippodrome theatre in 1961, the Princes Hall was built on the site of the old Warburg Barracks and was designed by Building Design Partnership. It opened in November 1972 with a gala concert by Kenny Ball and the Jazzmen and was named for HRH Prince Philip, Duke of Edinburgh who officially opened the centre on 22 May 1973 and who said: "I'm sure this centre will be a tremendous success. I can’t help feeling that you should all jump up and start dancing. In case there are any doubts – the place is now open".

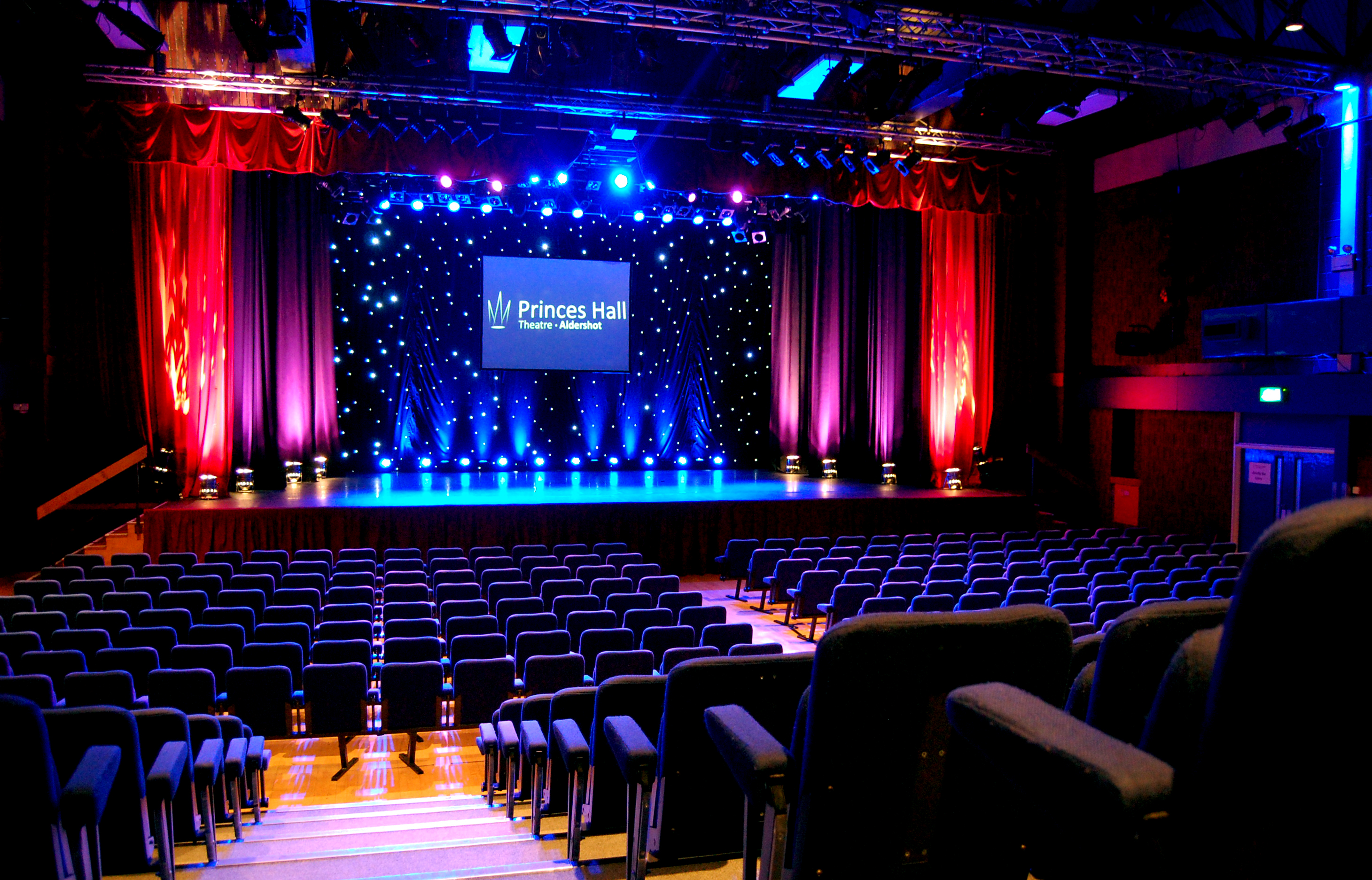
The Auditorium

Entertainers and personalities who have appeared at the Princes Hall include Gene Pitney, Ivor Emmanuel, Billy Fury, Marty Wilde, Heinz, New World, Martha Reeves and the Vandellas, Bobby Crush, Charles Hawtrey, Kenny Ball, Tommy Trinder, Bobby Davro, Syd Lawrence, Geno Washington, Jools Holland, Jane McDonald, Anna Karen, Joe Brown, Harry Corbett and Matthew Corbett in the Sooty Show, Little and Large, The Krankies, Val Doonican, Barbara Dickson, Danny La Rue, Lenny Henry, Dan Snow, Norman Wisdom, Des O'Connor, Alvin Stardust, The Hollies, Joan Armatrading and Katherine Jenkins.

It has also attracted many top comedians including Jimmy Carr, Frank Skinner, Rhod Gilbert, Sarah Millican, Lee Mack, Al Murray, Russell Kane, Jethro, Harry Hill, Bobby Davro, Freddie Starr, Russell Brand, Omid Djalili, Rob Brydon, Ross Noble, Lee Nelson, Russell Brand and Ken Dodd.

== Pantomime ==
Poster for the first pantomime starring Tommy Trinder (1972)

Ever since it opened the Princes Hall has hosted a popular annual pantomime for three weeks every December. The first pantomime held was Puss in Boots in December 1972 starring Tommy Trinder. Subsequent productions have included Harry H. Corbett in Robinson Crusoe (1973), Bob Grant in Cinderella (1974), Melvyn Hayes in Aladdin (1975), Roger Kitter in Jack and the Beanstalk (1976), John Junkin in Red Riding Hood (1977), Anna Karen in Dick Whittington (1979), Clive Dunn, Janet Fielding and Valentine Dyall in Aladdin (1983), Dave Lee Travis in The Pied Piper (1984) and Babes in the Wood (1991), Sally James in Dick Whittington (1985), Arthur English in Cinderella (1986), Johnny Ball in Jack and the Beanstalk (1988) and Mother Goose (1989), Keith Chegwin in Aladdin (1990) and Cinderella (1992), Danny John Jules and Nigel Pivaro in Jack and the Beanstalk (1994), Carmen Ejogo in Robin Hood (1995), Michael Fenton Stevens in The Wizard of Oz (2000), Bodger & Badger in Jack and the Beanstalk (2001), and Dominic Wood in Cinderella (2002).

The pantomime has been produced and directed by Hopkins Associates since 1994 (celebrating 20 years of pantomime in 2013) and is written by James Barry. Since 2005 the Princes Hall has produced many well-known and well-attended fairy tales. These have included: Sleeping Beauty (2005), Beauty and the Beast (2006), The Wizard of Oz (2007), Peter Pan (2008), Snow White (2009), Cinderella (2010), Aladdin (2011), Beauty and the Beast (2012), Peter Pan (2013), and Snow White (2014).

== Ice Show ==
From 2006 to 2008 the Princes Hall hosted a professional ice show in the main auditorium during the summer. Over 14 tonnes of crushed ice were used to create the ice rink on the main stage, on which over 30 Russian ice skaters and acrobats performed. These were Snow White on Ice (2006), Peter Pan on Ice (2007) and Beauty and the Beast on Ice (2008).

== Aldershot Visitor Information Centre ==
Since 2010 the Princes Hall has also been the location of the Aldershot Visitor Information Centre. Services available include advice on things to do and see locally, books, maps and guides, local accommodation, events and information as well as train and bus time tables.

== See also ==
- West End Centre, Aldershot
- Hippodrome, Aldershot
- Theatre Royal, Aldershot
