= Walter DeLeon =

American screenwriter

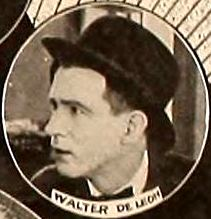
- DeLeon from an ad for Democracy: The Vision Restored (1920)
- Born: May 3, 1884; Oakland, California, US
- Died: August 1, 1947 (aged 63); Los Angeles, California, US
- Occupations: Screenwriter, playwright
- Years active: 1912–1953

Walter DeLeon (May 3, 1884 – August 1, 1947) was an American screenwriter and playwright.

== Biography ==
Walter DeLeon was born on May 3, 1884, in Oakland, California. DeLeon made his playwright debut at Idora Park in Oakland. He wrote for 69 films that were released between 1921 and 1953, and acted in one film. He died on August 1, 1947, in Los Angeles.

== Filmography ==
- Scared Stiff (1953)
- The Time of Their Lives (1946)
- Little Giant (1946)
- Birth of the Blues (1941)
- The Ghost Breakers (1940)
- Union Pacific (1939)
- The Big Broadcast of 1938 (1938)
- Ruggles of Red Gap (1935)
- Tillie and Gus (1933)
- The Phantom President (1932)
- Meet the Wife (1931)
- Won by a Neck (1930)
- Big Money (1930)
- The Sophomore (1929)
- The Little Giant (1926)
- The Ghost Breaker (1922)
