= Sara Biala =

Polish-American stage actress (1881–1963)

Sarah Biala
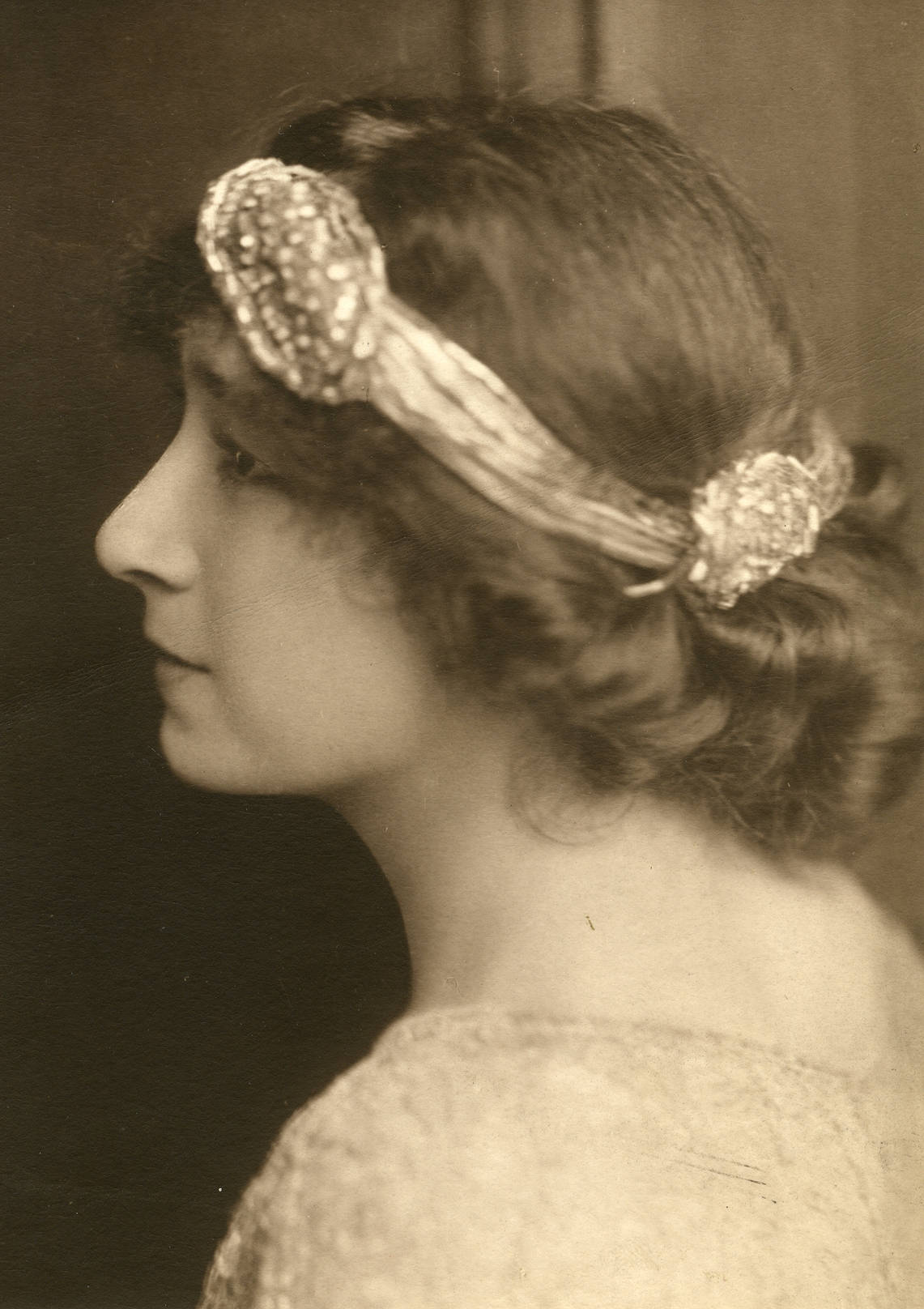
- Biala c.1912
- Born: Sarah Bialablotcky; February 5, 1881; Pilviškiai, Lithuania
- Died: March 15, 1963 (aged 82); Des Moines, Iowa, U.S.
- Education: Drake University
- Occupation: Stage actress
- Years active: 1909–1934
- Spouse: Harry D. Cohen (m. 1920–1963)

Sarah Biala (born Sarah Bialablotcky; February 5, 1881 – March 15, 1963) was a Polish-born American actress active on Broadway.

== Early life ==
Sarah Blotcky was born in Pilvishok, Lithuania, the daughter of Jacob Blotcky and Miriam (Mary) Werblofsky Blotcky. In early childhood, she moved to the United States with her family. She was raised in Iowa, and studied oratory at Drake University. She also studied music in Chicago.

== Career ==
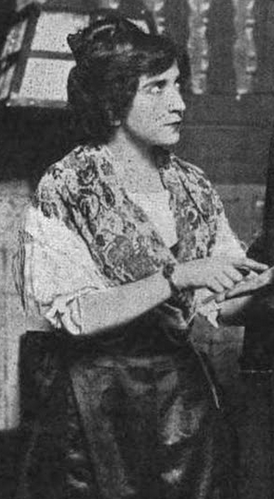
Sara Biala in The Ghost Breaker, 1913.

Sarah Blotcky performed as a "dramatic reciter" in the midwest before going to New York. Sarah Biala's first Broadway show was A Citizen's Home (1909). She continued to appear on Broadway, with roles in Baby Mine (1910), The Clouds (1911), The Ghost Breaker (1913), Pilate's Daughter (1914), Some Baby! (1915), Paganini (1916), The Torches (1917), and The Broken Chain (1929). During World War I she appeared in two topical dramas: War Brides (1916), and The Weaker One (1918). She also appeared in Mary Magdalene and The Snow Storm at the Hackett Theatre in New York, and in Three Spoonfuls in London in 1915. She appeared in several silent films, including The Heart of a Gypsy (1919), The Fear Market (1920), and The Law of the Yukon (1920).

Biala was described as having "deep, tragic eyes". In 1910, she was refused membership in the Three Arts Club because she was Jewish. In 1934 she returned to New York to study acting with Frances Duff-Robinson.

== Personal life ==
Sarah Biala married Harry D. Cohen in 1920, in Chicago. They lived in Iowa, where she sometimes gave dramatic readings. She died in 1963, aged 82 years. Her remains were buried in the Jewish cemetery in Des Moines, Iowa.
