= Theatre Royal, Aldershot =

Former theatre in Aldershot, England

Coordinates: 51°14′51″N 0°45′50″W

The Theatre Royal in 1945

The Theatre Royal was a theatre in Aldershot in Hampshire which opened in 1891 and was demolished in 1959. The teenage Charlie Chaplin appeared there in 1904 and the actor James Mason is believed to have made his stage début at the theatre in 1931.

== Early years ==
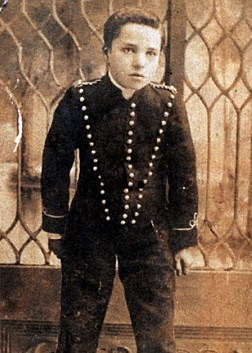
A teenage Charlie Chaplin in the play Sherlock Holmes, in which he appeared at the Theatre Royal in 1904

Located on the corner of Gordon Road and Birchett Road in Aldershot, the Theatre Royal replaced the Apollo Music Hall which had been on the corner of Union Street and Grosvenor Road in Aldershot from 1856 until it was destroyed by a fire in February 1889 during a performance of Monte Cristo & Co. Originally a music hall, the Theatre Royal was regularly visited by touring companies of the D'Oyly Carte Opera Company. From 1887 this theatre was run by Clarence Sounes. The new theatre was designed by the theatre architects Bertie Crewe and W. G. R. Sprague.

The singer and comedian Arthur Lloyd appeared at the theatre in a tour of his play Ballyvogan in 1891, while the Broadway actor Frank Westerton appeared there in 1896. The theatre was extensively rebuilt and remodelled by Sounes and opened on 15 October 1900 as the New Theatre Royal with a production of The Private Secretary. Charlie Chaplin, who had made his first stage appearance in Aldershot in 1894 returned to the town in May 1904 as a professional actor to play Billy the Page Boy in a tour of William Gillette's play Sherlock Holmes, with Harry Arthur Saintsbury in the title role. The music hall star Albert Chevalier played the theatre in My Old Dutch in 1908 followed shortly after by George Robey, Seymour Hicks and Ellaline Terriss, Fred Karno and a repeat visit by Charlie Chaplin.

The aviator Samuel Franklin Cody was in a box in the theatre in 1912 when, being observed by the audience he was invited to step to the front of the box to talk about the aeroplanes he was developing. The English Opera Company appeared here in March 1914 in The Bohemian Girl, Il Trovatore, Don Giovanni and Cavalleria Rusticana, among other works. In 1917 the curtain raiser Ida Collaborates by Noël Coward and Esmé Wynne-Tyson was performed at the theatre.

This new theatre was very small on a small site and could only seat 881 in total, with 197 in the stalls, 220 in the pit, 84 in the Dress Circle, and 350 in the gallery at the rear of the dress circle with its own entrance from Gordon Road. There were two boxes which seated 30 in total on each side at Dress Circle level, with elaborate plasterwork on the dress circle and box fronts. The proscenium opening was 24 feet wide and 26 feet deep with the flies 32 feet high. In addition there were eight dressing rooms, a manager's office and a band room with the stalls, pit and circle each having its own licensed bar.

== Variety theatre ==
The Auditorium from the Stage

The interior of the Theatre Royal

In 1922 the actor and singer Martyn Green appeared here in a tour of Shuffle Along immediately before joining the D'Oyly Carte Opera Company. From 1925 to 1926 the theatre was owned by local businessman W. A. 'Willie' Rubick (1869–1926) on whose death the theatre transferred to his widow who sold it in 1928. During the 1930s the theatre was owned by Town & Country Theatres who also owned the Duchess Theatre in London. The actor James Mason is believed to have made his stage début here in 1931 in The Rascal. However, some sources claim this was at the nearby Hippodrome Theatre. The Theatre Royal went bankrupt in the 1930s and was reopened as a Variety Theatre by Ben Garcia in 1940 who managed it during World War II. Aldershot being a Garrison Town, much of the audience at this time was male leading to a number of nude revues being held at the theatre. Other acts at this time included Tod Slaughter in the melodrama Jack the Ripper, Billy Reid and his accordion band with Dorothy Squires as his vocalist, and Phyllis Dixey in her revue Peek A Boo.

== Decline ==
From 1946 to 1948 the Theatre Royal was home to Harry Hanson's Court Players. In the late 1940s, as her film career floundered, Jessie Matthews ran an amateur theatre group at the theatre. In 1948 Garcia leased the theatre to another management who formed the Aldershot Repertory Company who put on plays there including Pygmalion in 1950 starring Jessie Matthews until their final production, the pantomime Aladdin in December 1952. Following this there was a short season of repertory theatre by the Arthur Brough Players but the theatre again went bankrupt and finally closed. A backstage fire in 1957 led to great damage and the Theatre Royal was demolished in 1959. A block of flats, Matinée House, occupies the site today.

== See also ==
- Princes Hall
- West End Centre, Aldershot
- Hippodrome, Aldershot
