= West End Centre, Aldershot =

West End Centre

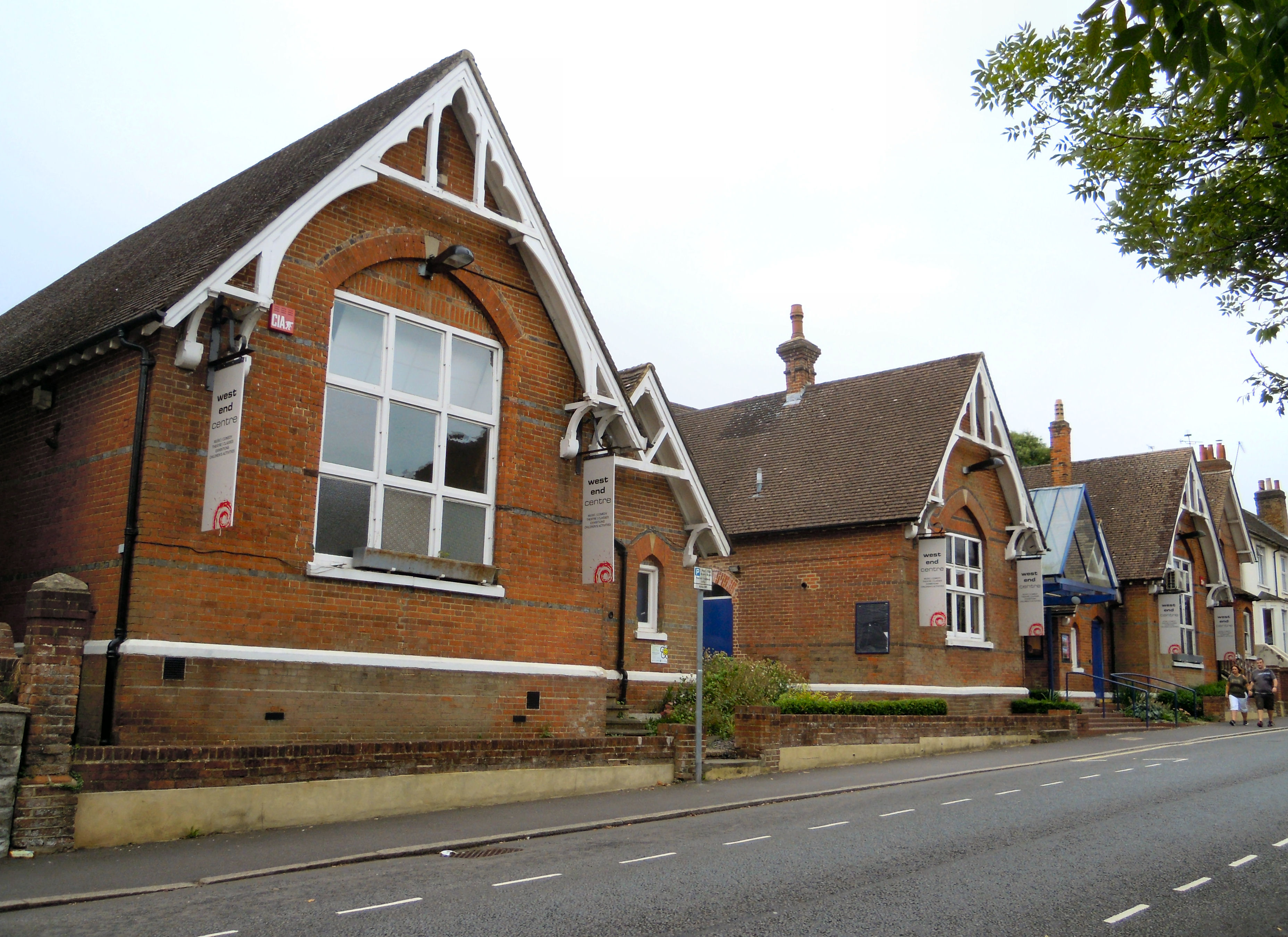
- The West End Centre in Aldershot
- Interactive map of the West End Centre area
- Alternative names: The Westy

General information
- Type: Arts Centre
- Architectural style: Victorian
- Location: 48 Queens Road, Aldershot, England
- Coordinates: 51.24796°N 0.76965°W
- Opened: 1975

Other information
- Seating type: Raked / Flat / Standing
- Seating capacity: 140-200

Website
- hampshireculturaltrust.org.uk/west-end-centre

The West End Centre is an entertainment venue and arts centre located on Queens Road in Aldershot. The centre hosts classes, workshops, art exhibitions, music performances (of heavy metal, blues, folk and punk music), stand-up comedy, and small-scale and intimate theatre.

== Background ==
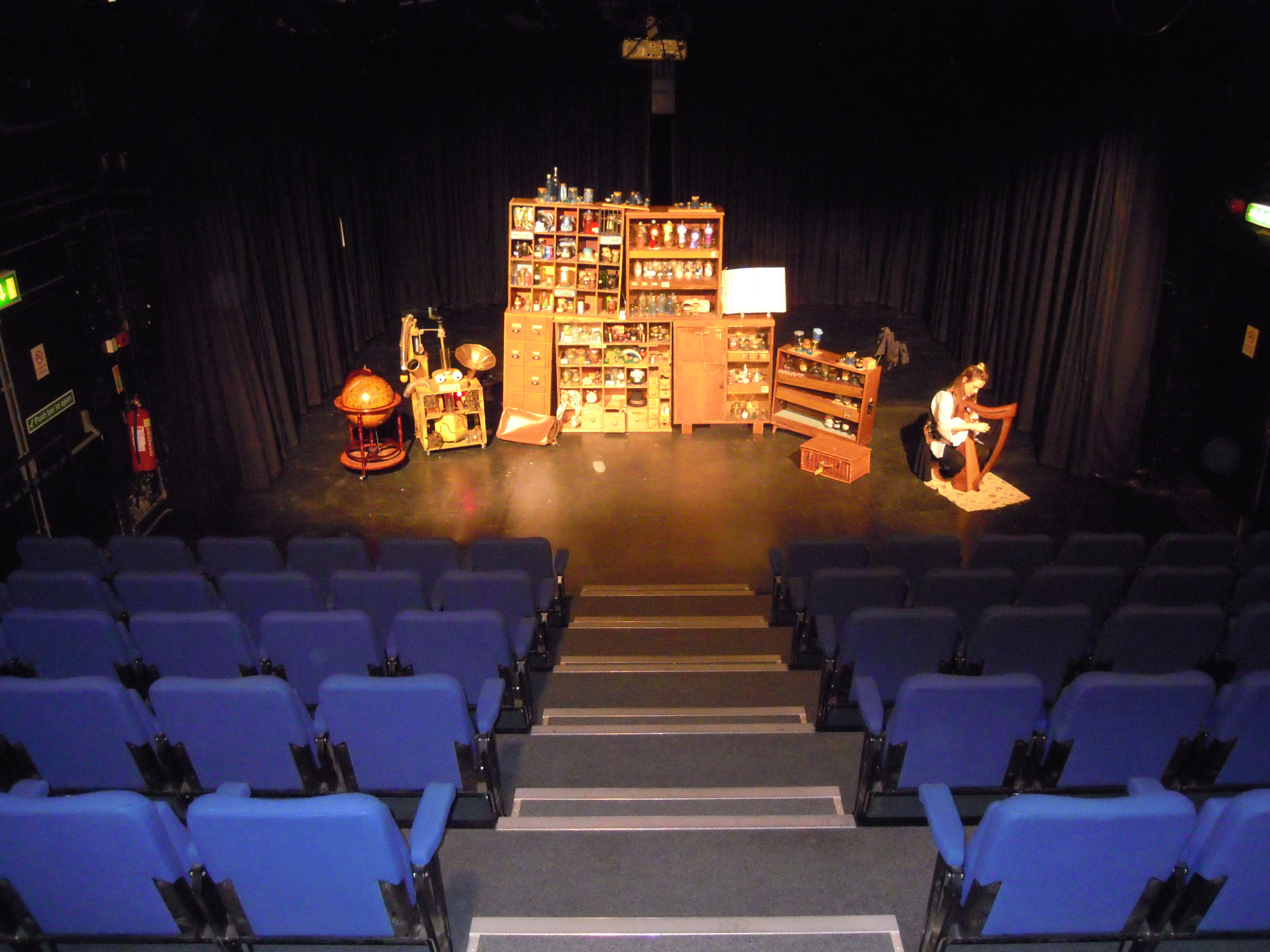
The Auditorium

Opening in 1975 in the former West End Junior School once attended by comedian Arthur English, the West End Centre (or the 'Westy') is described as "the creative hub of Aldershot and the surrounding areas". It was originally run by volunteers and faced closure in its early years until the Poet Laureate John Betjeman had the building locally listed. The Graeae Theatre Company was based at the Centre from 1981 to 1982.

When managed by Hampshire County Council the centre faced closure again in 2007 until public protests forced the decision to be reversed. Every year since 2006 the West End Centre has held the Summer Westival which creates an indoor music festival complete with real grass throughout the venue.

Performers who have appeared at the centre include Andy Parsons, Matt Forde, Sam Simmons, Roger McGough, Seann Walsh, Stewart Lee, Adrian Henri, Shappi Khorsandi, Miriam Margolyes, Omid Djalili, Dara Ó Briain, Jimmy Carr, Dave Gorman, Tony Hawks Daniel Kitson, Simon Munnery, Nish Kumar, Phill Jupitus, Justin Moorhouse, Pete Firman and Al Murray.

Bands who have appeared at the WEC include Blur, Happy Mondays, Stone Roses, Spiritualized, A, Primal Scream, Manic Street Preachers, Peter Green, Chas & Dave, Foals, The 1975, Biffy Clyro, The Temperance Movement, Nine Below Zero, Funeral for a Friend, PJ Harvey, The Xcerts and We Are the Ocean. The Centre has also provided support for local musicians Hundred Reasons and Sonny Black.

Today the Centre is managed by Hampshire Cultural Trust as an arts centre and venue for professional touring shows, the theatre space having a capacity of 106 with raked seating. From 2001 to 2019 the arts centre director was Barney Jeavons, the son of the actor Colin Jeavons.

== Gallery ==
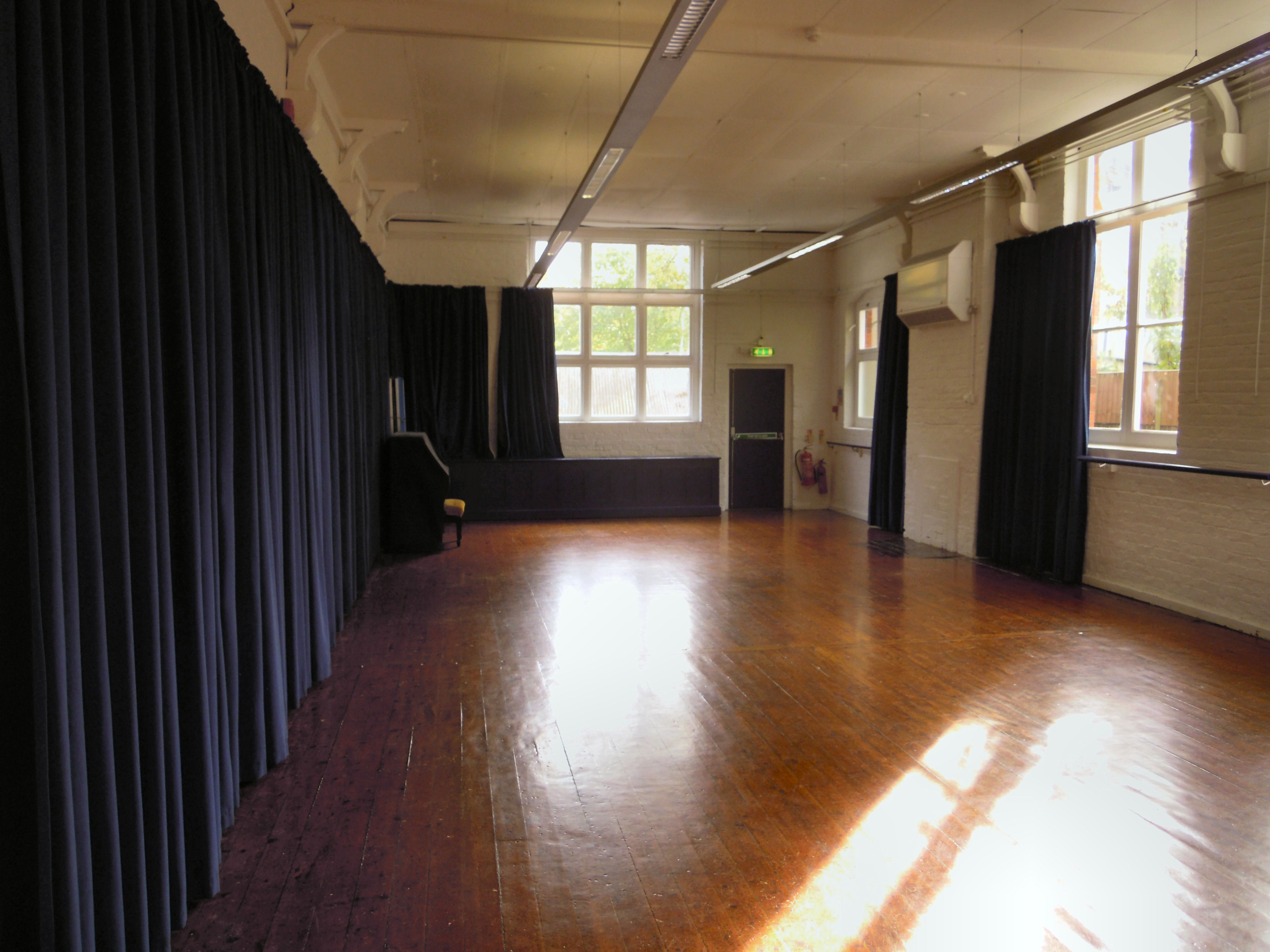
The Dance Studio

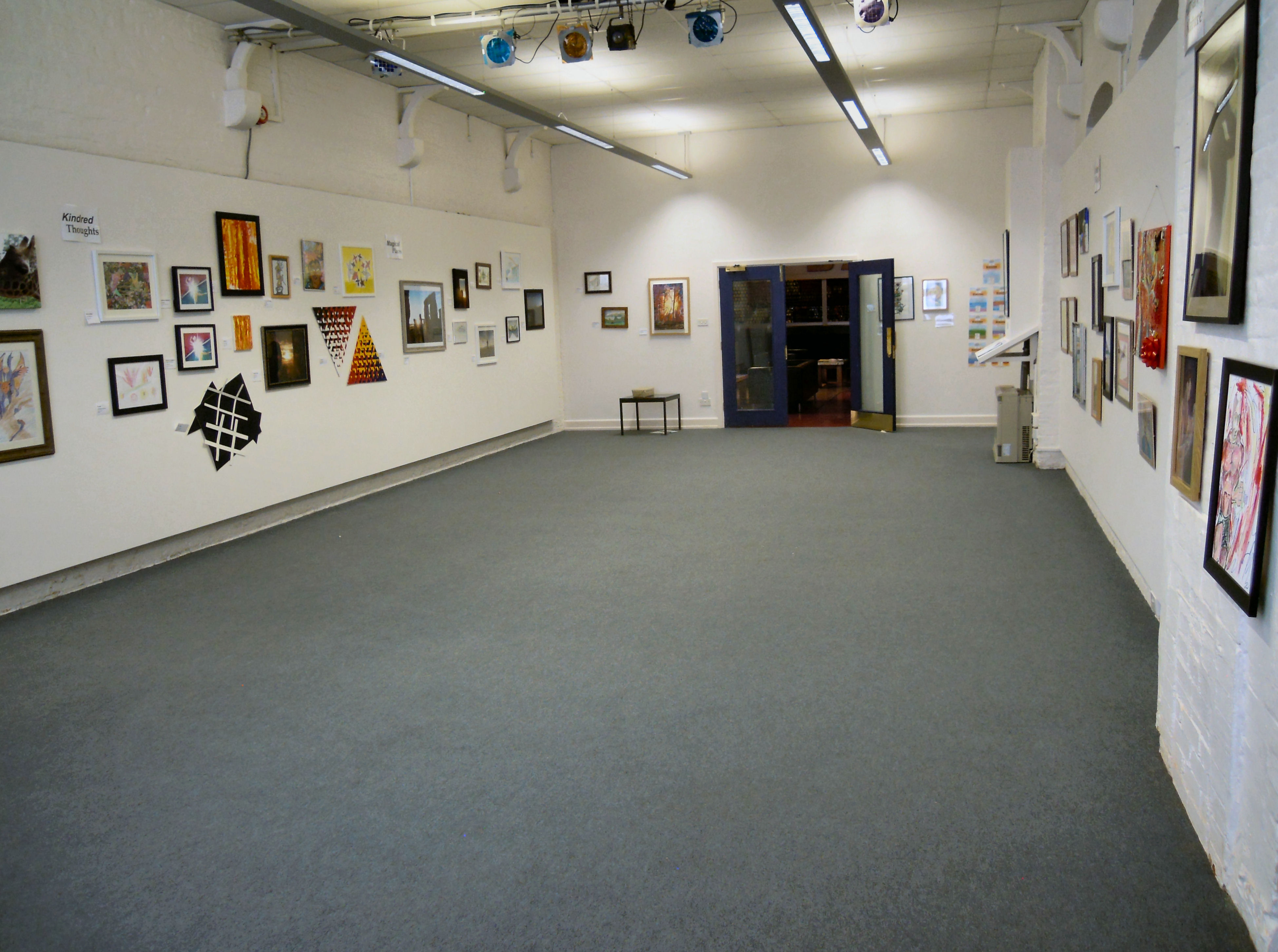
The Exhibition Hall

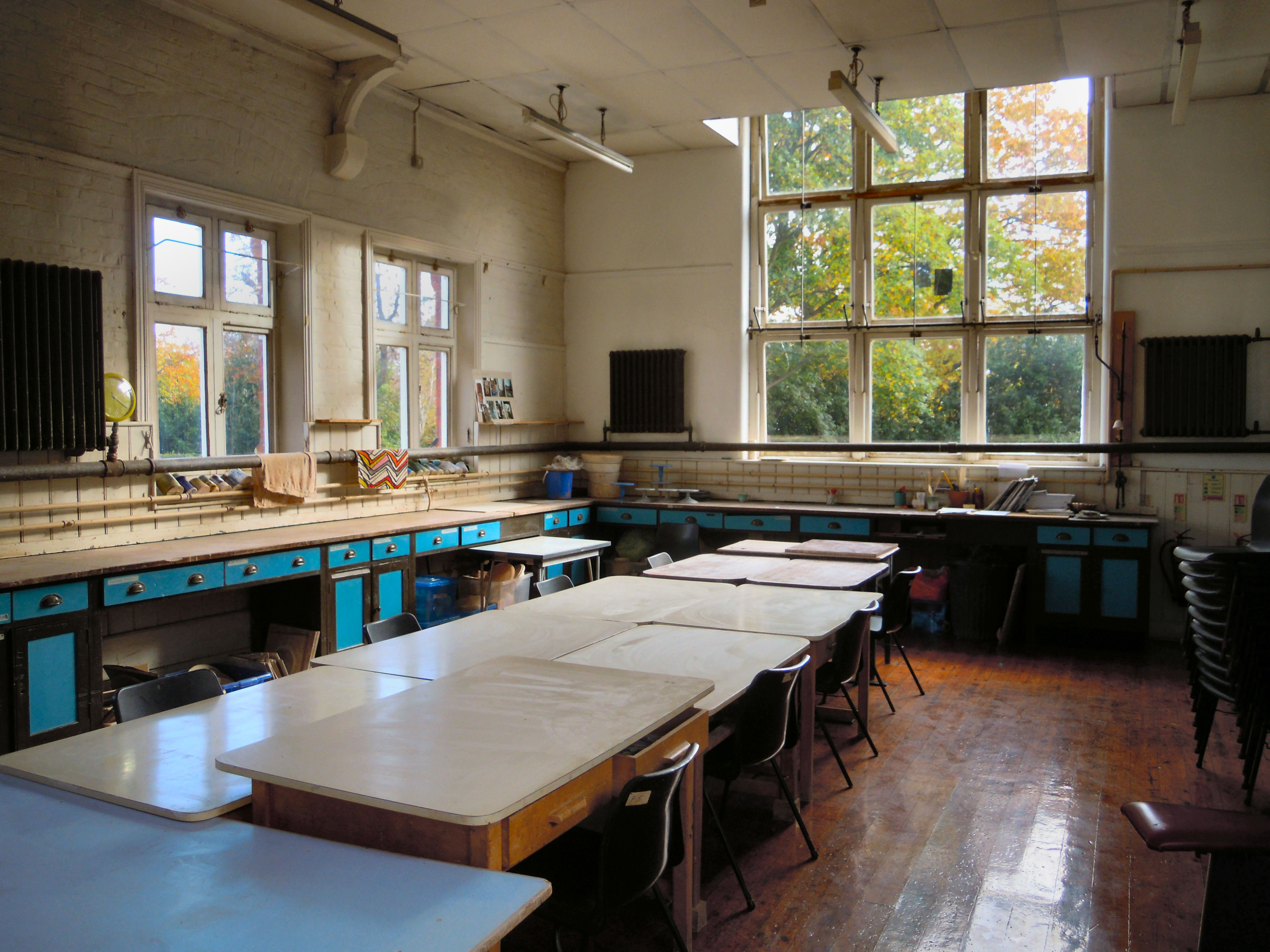
The Pottery Workshop

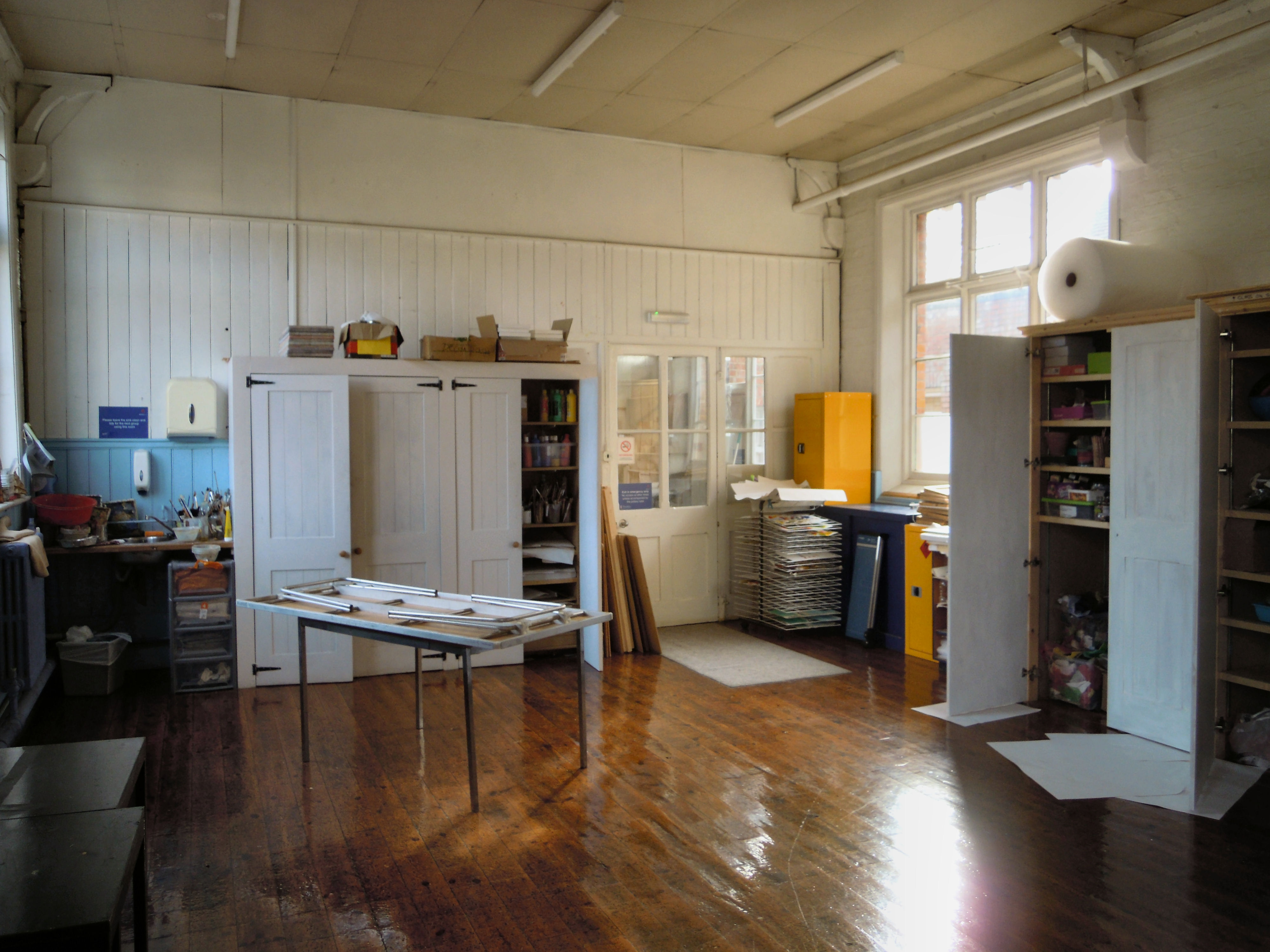
Art Workshop

== See also ==
- Princes Hall
- Hippodrome, Aldershot
- Theatre Royal, Aldershot

== External list ==
- Official website
