= The Ghost Breaker (play) =

1909 play by Paul Dickey and Charles W. Goddard

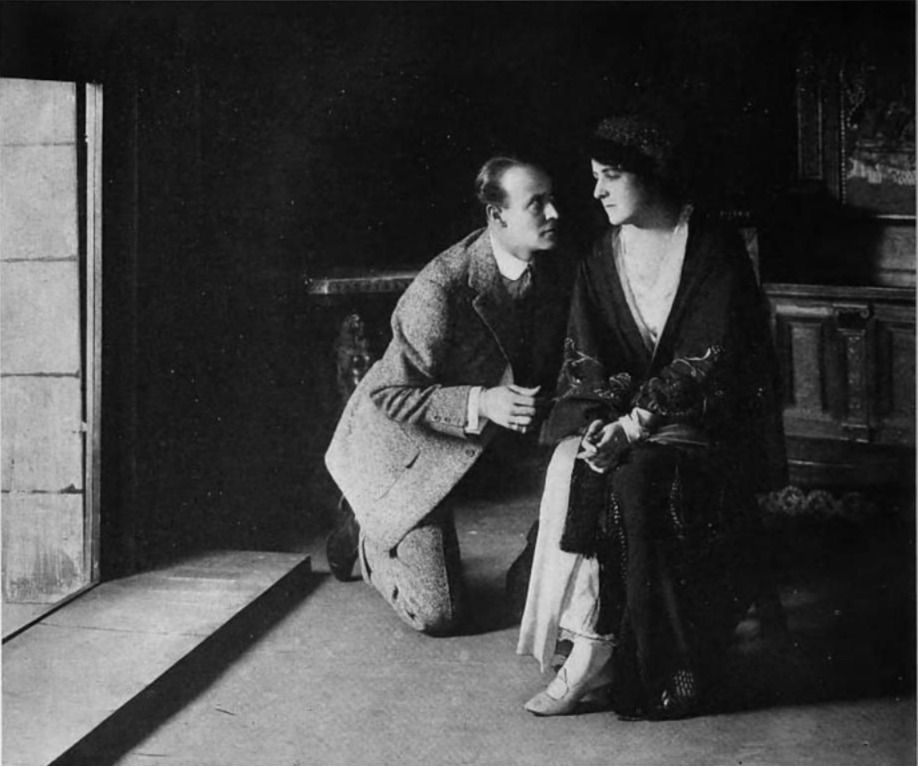
- H. B. Warner and Katherine Emmet
- Original language: English
- Written by: Paul Dickey and Charles W. Goddard
- Subject: Kentucky gentleman helps Spanish princess
- Genre: Melodrama, Farce
- Setting: Manhattan Hotel; SS Aquitania; Inn and castle in Segura, Spain

Premiere
- Date: March 3, 1913
- Place: Lyceum Theatre
- Directed by: Paul Dickey

The Ghost Breaker is a 1909 play by Paul Dickey and Charles W. Goddard. It is a mixed genre work in four acts, labelled a "melodramatic farce" by its authors. There are four settings and seventeen characters. The story concerns a Spanish princess who helps a Kentucky gentleman escape from the law in Manhattan, and he in turn helps rid her castle of a spirit. The action of the play takes place on two separate days a week apart.

The play was first produced by the authors for a one week tryout in 1910. It was then produced by Maurice S. Campbell in 1913, starring H. B. Warner, with Katherine Emmet, Frank Westerton, Frank Campeau, and Sara Biala in support. Tryouts began in February 1913 at various locales in Pennsylvania, New Jersey, and New York. The Broadway premiere came in early March 1913, with the run lasting ten weeks. Due to other contract obligations of H. B. Warner, the play did not go on tour until the Fall of 1913, nor was it later revived on Broadway.

The play served as the basis for a 1914 silent film in which H. B. Warner reprised his stage role, a 1915 novelization of the play, a 1922 silent film, and the 1940 film The Ghost Breakers.

== Characters ==
Characters are listed in order of appearance within their scope.

Lead

- Maria Theresa is a princess of Aragon, troubled by a ghost in her ancestral castle.
- Warren Jarvis is a young Kentucky man, caught up in a family feud that followed him to Manhattan.

Supporting

- Rusty Snow is Warren's black servant from Kentucky, comical but also resourceful.
- Carlos Hernando is Duke d'Alva, a distinguished-looking older cousin of Maria.
- Delores is the Innkeeper's daughter in Segura, who has turned against Don Robledo.
- Don Robledo is a mercenary soldier, aggressive and swaggering, henchman to Duke Carlos.

Featured

- Nita is Maria's young and fearful maid.
- House Detective works at the Manhattan Hotel.
- Hotel Porter works at the Manhattan Hotel.
- Detective is from Police Headquarters.
- Second Detective called Tom, is from Police Headquarters.
- Steward serves Maria on the Cunard line's SS Aquitania.
- Vardos is a loyal elderly follower of the missing prince.
- Maximo is an old discharged Spanish soldier.
- Gaspar is a villager of Segura who plays cards with Maximo.
- Pedro is the Innkeeper at Segura, fearful of Don Robledo's violence.

Bit Player

- Jose is the chauffeur for the Princess while in Spain.

Stuntman

- Knight is an unknown henchman of the Duke hidden in a suit of armor.

Voice only

- Voice and Second Voice in the Manhattan Hotel corridor.
- Ship's Officer on board the SS Aquitania.

Off stage

- Col. James Marcum head of the family feuding with the Jarvis family in Kentucky.
- Prince Basillio is Maria's brother, who disappeared in the castle earlier.

== Synopsis ==
The published play is less than seventy pages, quite short for a four-act work. Much of the play's running time is taken up with comic "business" as indicated by stage directions in the published play. There is also an admonition to the Stage Manager that the "best results in this play are obtained by a fast, snappy tempo throughout".

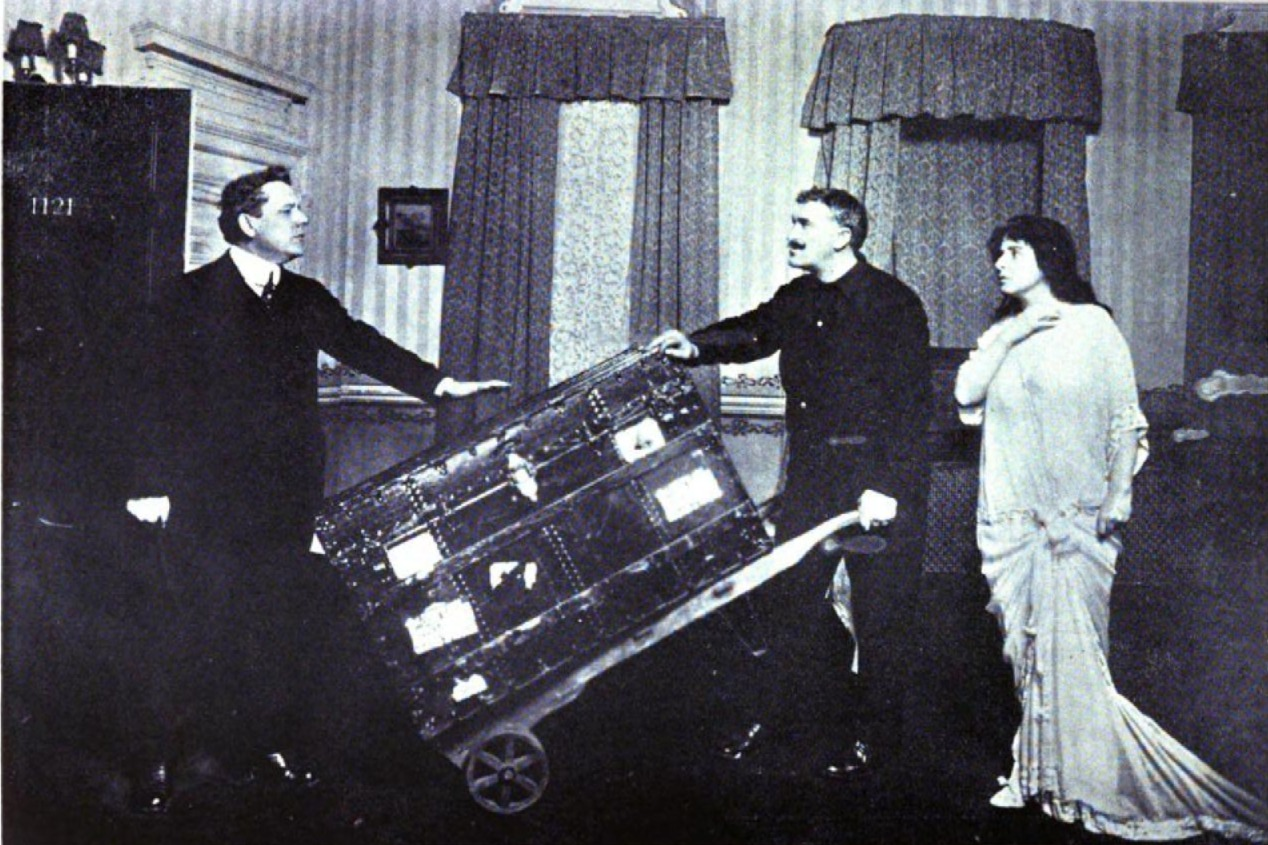
Act I: scene with Hotel Detective (Charles N. Greene) stops Hotel Porter (Frank Hilton) while Maria Theresa (Katherine Emmet) looks on

Act I (Suite 1121 in Manhattan Hotel, NYC. 5am.) Lured by Col. Marcum to the Manhattan Hotel, Warren Jarvis trades shots with him. Marcum is nearly killed, and Jarvis wounded in the wrist. He takes refuge in Maria Theresa's room, breaking the door lock to enter. He convinces her to let him hide in the other room, when Nita opens the door to the House Detective. Maria reassures the House Dick that she and her maid are fine and undisturbed by an intruder. Maria sends Nita back to bed when the detective leaves. She then gets Warren's story from him, and offers to save him if he helps her with a ghost. At Maria's insistence he swears an oath of vassalage to her. She will have him taken on-board the Aquitania in her steamer trunk. Jarvis has her telephone his servant Rusty Snow at the Hotel Belmont to come over to the Manhattan Hotel. Rusty is given the contents of the trunk wrapped in a blanket, also money to book passage for Jarvis and himself on the Aquitania. After cutting a hole in the trunk for air, he gets inside, just as the Hotel Porter knocks at the door. Maria instructs the porter to mark the trunk "Wanted" so it will be placed in her cabin and not in the cargo hold. As the trunk is being wheeled away, the Hotel Detective reappears. He stops the porter, and asks Maria about the broken door lock. She insists it was that way when she arrived, and that she must leave to catch her ship. The porter is allowed to go on, while police detectives are summoned to search the suite. (Curtain)

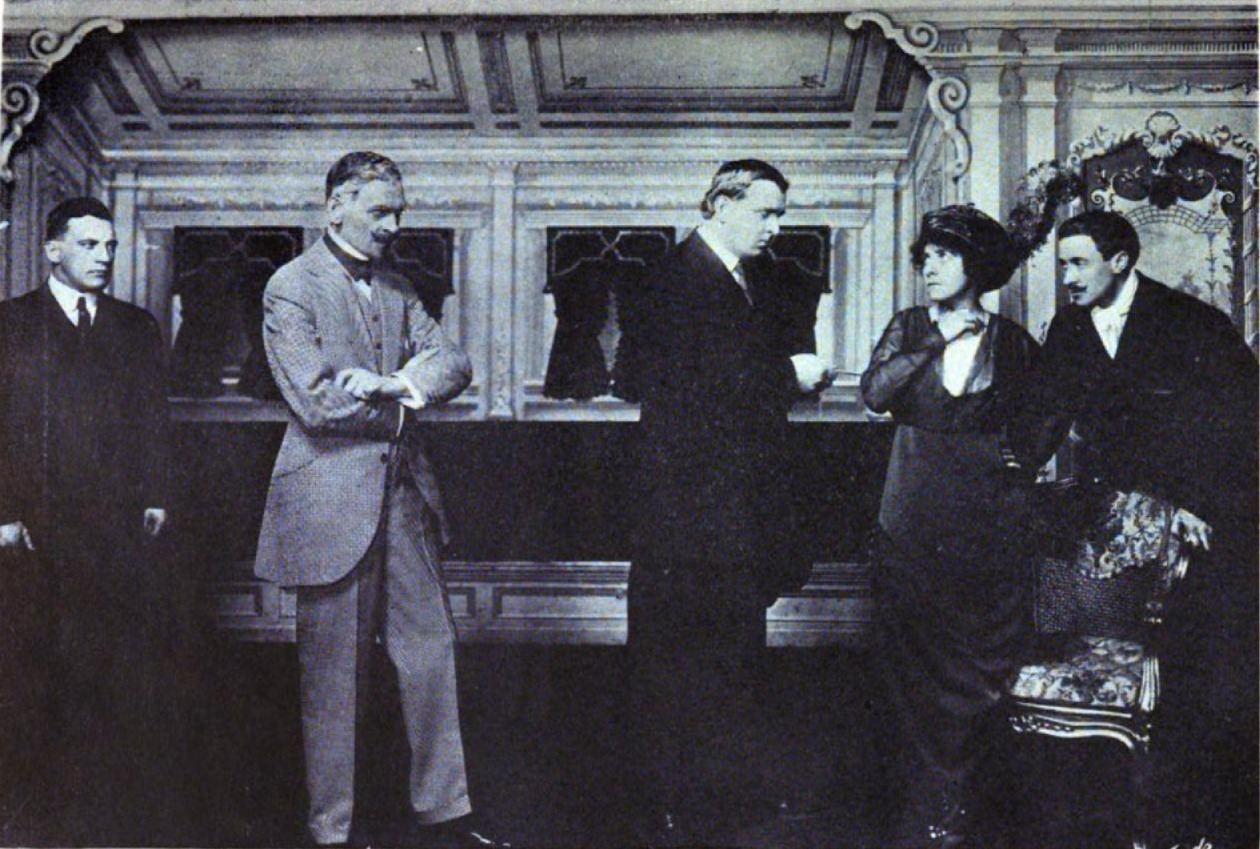
Act II: Second Detective (Walter H. Long), Duke Carlos (Frank Westerton), Detective (Joseph Robeson), Maria Theresa (Katherine Emmet), and Warren Jarvis (H. B. Warner)

Act II (Stateroom A on board the SS Aquitania, same morning.) At curtain rise, the steamer trunk is seen, turned upside down, and gently rocking back and forth. The Princess enters first, and notes the trunk's position. Nita and the Steward are right behind her. It takes the nervous Maria several minutes to get them out of the stateroom, so she can unlock the trunk. Before Jarvis can exit, Duke Carlos knocks and enters the stateroom. Surprised, Maria learns he has followed her to America. With difficulty she leads him on deck so Jarvis can free himself. Jarvis phones Rusty from the stateroom to bring the trunk contents. He tells Rusty to return to their own room and pretend to be a deaf-mute. Maria returns alone and tells Jarvis about the deserted and supposedly haunted castle, how her brother the Prince disappeared there, and about the hidden treasure. She came to America to find an old locket that had a hidden note in it locating the treasure. The Duke enters and is introduced to Jarvis. The Duke is suspicious of him, and the two verbally spar, until interrupted by police detectives. The Duke tries to shop Jarvis to the police, but Jarvis adroitly turns the detectives against Carlos by taking advantage of the Duke's snobbish manner and unfamiliarity with American slang. They leave to go ashore on the pilot boat, but Jarvis menacingly stops Carlos from leaving the stateroom. (Curtain)

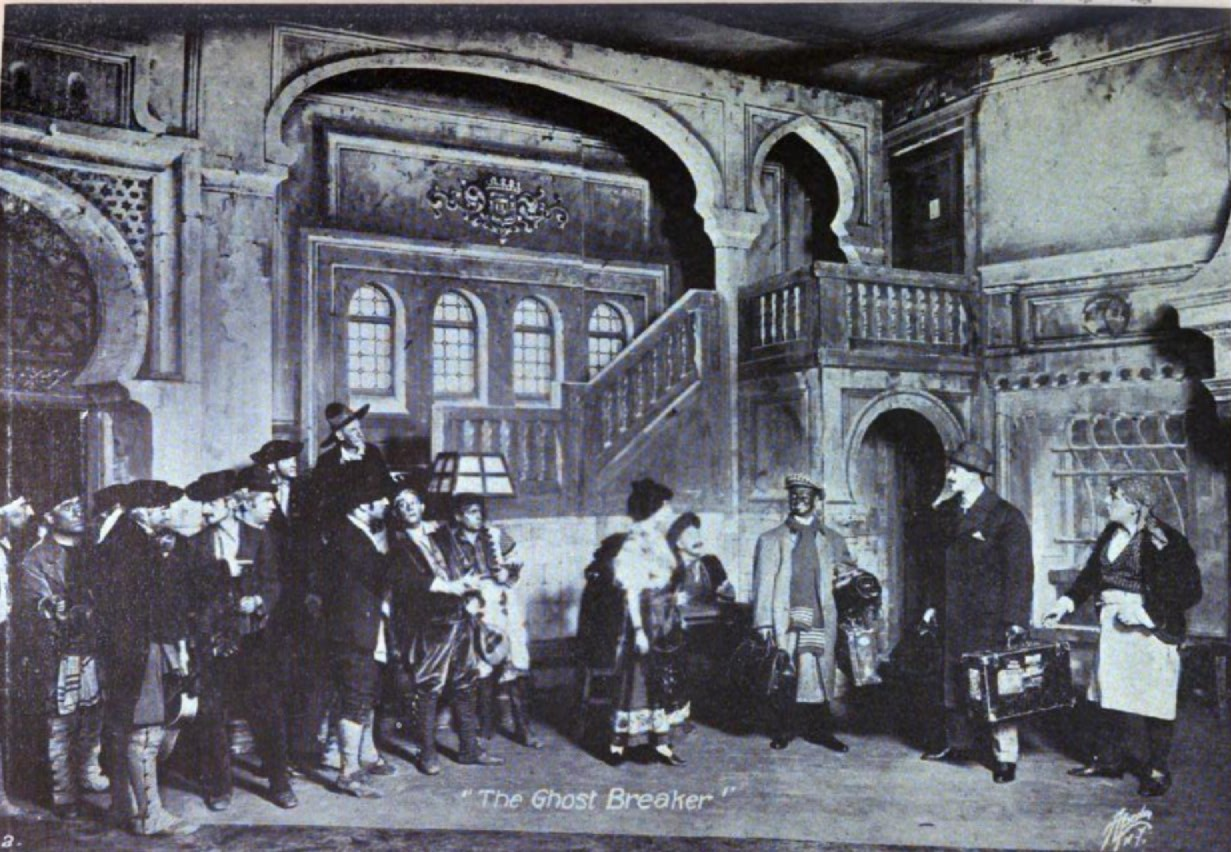
Act III: scene at the old inn in Segura

Act III (An old inn at Segura, Spain, at evening.) Vardos sorrowfully informs Delores that there is still no sign of the Prince at the castle, but that he will visit it again the next day. Don Robledo verbally abuses Pedro, commanding him to take care of his horse, and prepare for the Duke's imminent arrival. He grabs Delores, but she rebuffs him for not searching for the Prince. The Duke arrives, alerting Pedro and Delores to the Princess, whose is coming in her motorcar. The Duke also warns Don Robledo that Jarvis must not reach the castle tonight. Upon arrival the Princess commands Delores and Pedro to aid the American man following her. Jarvis and Rusty are next to enter the inn. The Duke tries to scare, then buy off Jarvis, who is unmoved. Don Robledo proposes a sneering toast to the fool going to the castle. While Rusty fetches lanterns and horses from Pedro, Jarvis hears from the Princess that the locket has been stolen. They suspect Duke Carlos, who claimed he had to go to Madrid. Jarvis decides to go to the castle at once. As he descends the steps, the inn's courtyard is deserted. Jarvis throws his coat over the single lantern on the table, frustrating Don Robledo's shot, while return fire from Jarvis brings down the would-be assassin. (Curtain)

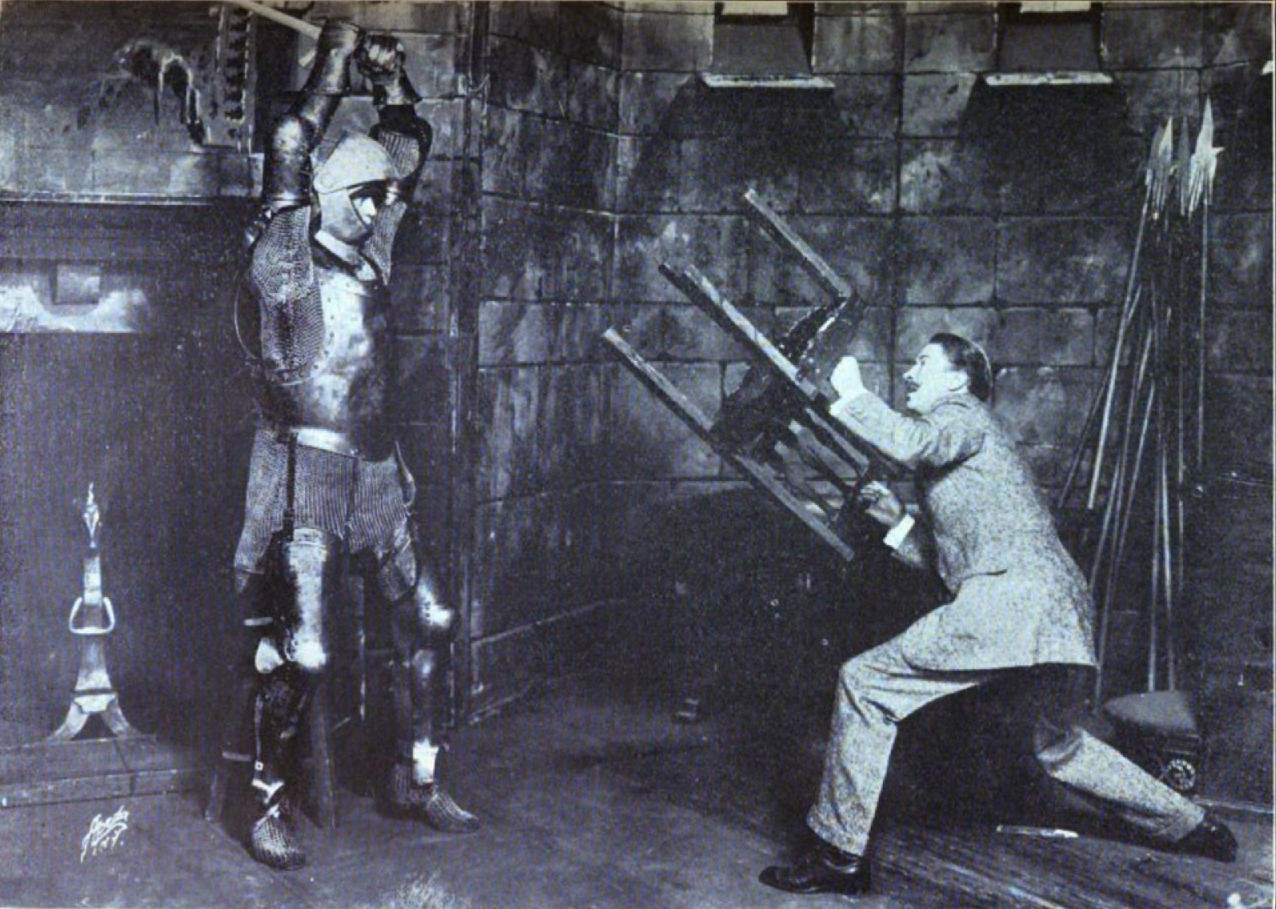
Acte IV: scene from the old castle at Segura

Act IV (The Hall of the Knights in the castle, same night.) Jarvis and Rusty have searched the decaying castle with their lanterns, but find neither prince nor treasure. They have heard some dull thuds and smell traces of a smokey lantern. Rusty breaks up a rotting table to build a fire in the hall's fireplace. They discover a trap door, hinged in the middle so whichever side is stepped on pitches the unwary into a long drop. Groans are heard, but the discovery of a hammer and chisel tells Jarvis the treasure must be located in this room. He tells Rusty the Duke and his men are watching them and trying to scare them out of the hall. Rusty yells "Look out" when one of the suits of armor raises a sword to strike Jarvis. After a short battle, Jarvis maneuvers the knight into stepping on the trap door, sending it plunging down. Jarvis has Rusty get into another suit of armor as a precaution. Carrying a lantern, Delores, Maximo, and the Princess enter the hall. They explain that the Prince has escaped that same night and has gone to the king for help. Don Robledo is dying and confessed his guilt. Maximo takes Delores back to the inn, but the Princess refuses to leave Jarvis in the castle. By the light of the fireplace they confess their mutual love. The Duke sneezes from his hiding place behind a picture, and is forced into the open by Jarvis' threat to shoot through the painting. The Duke hands over the locket and departs. Maria tells Jarvis she loves him and will go to Kentucky with him. (Slow curtain)

== Original production ==
=== Background ===
Paul Dickey was an actor and Charles W. Goddard a journalist when they joined forces to write The Ghost Breaker in 1909. Goddard had written the draft for it several years earlier; when he showed it to Dickey, the latter recognized its stage potential at once.

Dickey, a former varsity halfback at Michigan under Fielding Yost, had already written a one-act sketch with Emmett Corrigan. Goddard, who graduated from Dartmouth in 1902, was an editor for the Sunday American Magazine. They had the good fortune to immediately sell their play to producer Henry B. Harris. Harris never got around to producing it, and after a year the manuscript came back to the authors. However, it later developed that Harris still had an option on the play. Dickey and Goddard shopped the play to other producers, but not until the fall of 1912 did they find a taker in Maurice S. Campbell. He agreed to produce the play, only to find out that the Harris estate (Note: Harris had perished in the RMS Titanic sinking earlier that year, and his estate was now in the hands of his wife Renee, who survived the disaster.) had a lien on it. It took until December 1912 for the legalities to be settled, so Campbell could formally accept the play for production.

Campbell wanted H. B. Warner to play the lead, which meant arranging to take over his management from George C. Tyler of Liebler & Company. He then persuaded Katherine Emmet to leave The Affairs of Anatol to join the cast of The Ghost Breaker.

=== Cast ===
Cast from the tryouts through the Broadway run. Production was on hiatus from April 20 through April 27, 1913.
Role	Actor	Dates	Notes and sources
Maria Theresa	Katherine Emmet	Feb 10, 1913 - May 10, 1913	
Warren Jarvis	H. B. Warner	Feb 10, 1913 - May 10, 1913	
Rusty Snow	William Sampson	Feb 10, 1913 - Feb 23, 1913	Sampson played this role in blackface.
Rusty Snow	John Daly Murphy	Feb 27, 1913 - Mar 01, 1913	Murphy replaced Sampson only for the Rochester tryout.
Rusty Snow	William Sampson	Mar 03, 1913 - May 1, 1913	Sampson returned to the role with the Broadway premiere.
Rusty Snow	Sam J. Burton	May 2, 1913 - May 10, 1913	Burton replaced Sampson for the production's last week on Broadway.
Duke Carlos	Frank Westerton	Feb 10, 1913 - May 10, 1913	
Delores	Aline McDermott	Feb 10, 1913 - Feb 23, 1913	McDermott was in the early tryouts but was replaced before Rochester.
Delores	Sara Biala	Feb 27, 1913 - May 10, 1913	Biala joined the cast by the time of the Rochester tryout.
Don Robledo	Frank Campeau	Feb 10, 1913 - May 10, 1913	
Nita	Margaret Boland	Feb 10, 1913 - May 10, 1913	
House Detective	Charles N. Greene	Feb 10, 1913 - May 10, 1913	
Hotel Porter	Frank Hilton	Feb 10, 1913 - May 10, 1913	
Detective	Griffith Evans	Feb 10, 1913 - Mar 01, 1913	Evans lasted all through the tryouts but was then replaced.
Detective	Joseph Robison	Mar 03, 1913 - May 10, 1913	Robison (some cast lists have "Robeson") took over the role with the Broadway premiere.
Second Detective	Walter H. Long	Feb 10, 1913 - May 10, 1913	
Steward	Andrew M. Buckley	Feb 10, 1913 - May 10, 1913	
Vardos	Walter Dean	Feb 10, 1913 - May 10, 1913	
Gaspar	Allen Prentice	Feb 10, 1913 - May 10, 1913	
Maximo	Arthur Standish	Feb 10, 1913 - May 10, 1913	
Pedro	James Anderson	Feb 10, 1913 - May 10, 1913	
Jose	Martin Goodman	Feb 10, 1913 - May 10, 1913	

=== Tryouts ===
The Ghost Breaker was first performed at the Olentangy Park Theatre near Columbus, Ohio in July 1910. According to a later account by Charles Goddard, it was made possible by Paul Dickey having an acting assignment in Columbus. The authors themselves financed the one-week run, with Dickey playing the lead role. It received only one newspaper review, by a woman who thought it highly entertaining but nevertheless was critical of its structural problems.

After Maurice Campbell secured rights to the play, its next tryout was at the Mishler Theatre in Johnstown, Pennsylvania on February 11, 1913. After two nights, the production moved to the Academy of Music in Reading, Pennsylvania. This tryout was reviewed in a local paper; the critic judged the play a success in the first three acts, but that it would need "doctoring" for the final.

The production went to Nixon's Apollo Theatre in Atlantic City for three nights starting February 13, 1913. Once again, a local critic mentioned the dichotomy between the first three acts and the finish, in which they thought the playwright abandoned the prevailing mixed genre and settled wholly for farce. It then went to the Newark Theatre in Newark, New Jersey, on February 17, 1913, where the local reviewer had only positive remarks on the performance.

On February 27, 1913, it had its last tryout at the Lyceum Theatre in Rochester, New York, where it ran through March 1, 1913.

=== Broadway premiere and reception ===
The Ghost Breaker had its Broadway premiere on March 3, 1913 at the Lyceum Theatre. The Brooklyn Daily Eagle reviewer said it was good entertainment and likely to be a success with H. B. Warner starring, but that the two middle acts could be condensed. The critic for the New-York Tribune felt the melodrama and romance of the play were lost in the incessant stream of laughs, particularly in the fourth act with comic turns by William Sampson as Rusty Snow. They also said that while H. B. Warner was an excellent actor he hardly suggested a Kentuckian. The audience liked the settings, particularly in the second and fourth acts, while Frank Westerton, Frank Campeau, and Sara Biala performed well. The Brooklyn Citizen critic praised the settings, H. B. Warner, and noted that Katherine Emmet performed well in a role that did not give full range to her talents.

The Sun called The Ghost Breaker a swashbuckler and suggested it was also a Ruritanian romance, with "an impossible plot". The reviewer for The Brooklyn Daily Times, who caught the second night's performance, said it was "attractive, though not plausible" but was appreciated by the audience. They added: "It is difficult to define just what kind of play The Ghost Breaker is" but that it had "settled down for a long run." The New York Times critic thought the romantic phrases used in the play were "stilted" and the audience had to wait a long time for the hero's fourth act fight with a suit of armor. They also thought there was nothing in H. B. Warner's performance to suggest a regional Kentucky character, nor in Katherine Emmet's indicative of a Spanish princess. They concluded by judging "The Ghost Breaker doesn't merit either extended or serious consideration."

Three weeks into The Ghost Breaker's run The Brooklyn Daily Times reported that "the house has been practically sold out at every performance". The Brooklyn Citizen reported that Henrietta Crosman was challenged by her husband, producer Maurice Campbell, to play the part of Delores for a Saturday matinee with minimal preparation. She accepted on condition that Douglas Fairbanks, who was also present, play the part of the chauffeur Jose, to which he agreed.

On Sunday afternoon, April 20, 1913, H. B. Warner and his wife were invited by producer Maurice Campbell to go motoring to Long Island. With Campbell driving, their car was struck by another that had just passed it, causing Campbell's car to lose a wheel and overturn. Warner and Campbell were badly bruised and cut, but Mrs. Warner had her skull fractured, and died a few hours later. The Lyceum Theatre closed for a week following the accident, reopening April 28, 1913.

=== Broadway closing ===
The play closed at the Lyceum Theatre on May 10, 1913, due to a prior contract commitment for H. B. Warner to perform in Chicago.

== Adaptations ==
=== Film ===
- The Ghost Breaker (1914) - H. B. Warner reprised his stage role for this Famous Players–Lasky release.
- The Ghost Breaker (1922)
- The Ghost Breakers (1940)
- Scared Stiff (1953)

=== Literary ===
- The Ghost Breaker (1915) - Hearst International released this novelization, credited to Charles Goddard and Paul Dickey (in that order), in November 1915, illustrated with photos.

=== Television ===
A pilot for a 1971 television series was made but the series wasn't picked up by the networks. It was to star Warren Berlinger and Bob Denver of Gilligan's Island fame.

== Bibliography ==
- Paul Dickey and Charles Goddard. The Ghost Breaker: A Melodramatic Farce in Four Acts. Samuel French, 1923.
