= Hippodrome, Aldershot =

Former theatre in Aldershot, Hampshire

Coordinates: 51°14′51″N 0°45′42″W

The Hippodrome in 1916

The Hippodrome was a theatre in the town of Aldershot in Hampshire. It operated as a venue for variety shows, pantomimes, musical comedies and other shows from 1913 to 1961. When Peter Sellers appeared there in 1948 he complained that the band accompanying his drum act were four bars behind as they were eating their sandwiches while they were playing.

== Early years ==
Located on the corner of Station Road and Birchett Road in Aldershot, and replacing a group of derelict buildings which dated to the late 1850s, the Hippodrome was built for Clarence Sounes and was designed by the leading English theatre architect Bertie Crewe. It was a sister theatre to the Kingston Empire at Kingston upon Thames, which had opened in 1910.

The Hippodrome opened on 3 February 1913 with variety shows twice a night at 6.30 and 8.50 pm. The bill on opening night included Chas Karnac & Co, The Four Debutants, Sisters Jerome, Tom Westwall, Duncan & Godfrey, Chas Kitts and Rhoda Windrum.

== Theatre and cinema ==
The interior of the Hippodrome in 1913

The theatre was the largest for miles around with seating for about 1,000 people, which included 449 seats in the stalls, 258 seats in the dress circle, 272 seats in the balcony (originally this was benched) in addition to four boxes which seated four people in each. The proscenium was 24 feet wide, and the stage was 30 feet high and 22 feet in depth. The theatre was equipped with bars on all levels and eight dressing rooms. By March 1914, the Hippodrome was showing Kinemacolor films alongside the variety acts and, by the end of the 1920s, cinema shows were occasionally also being shown there.

The Hippodrome was taken over by Kingshot Theatres in 1930 who refurbished it in 1931 with a "Grand Re-Opening" on 6 April 1931, when it began to show twice nightly cine-variety including the screening of "Pathé Super Sound Gazette", part of Pathé News.

By 1953, in addition to the twice-nightly variety shows the Hippodrome also staged pantomimes, circus acts, plays and musical comedies.

== Notable performers ==
Poster advertising Phyllis Dixey's act- the Hippodrome, Aldershot (1955)

The Hippodrome played host to many famous artists of the day, including: Marie Lloyd, Neville Kennard, The Western Brothers, Tom Leamore, Humphrey Lyttelton, Acker Bilk, Mike & Bernie Winters, Eric Delaney, Chas McDevitt and Nancy Whiskey, Arthur English, 'Monsewer' Eddie Gray, Clapham and Dwyer, Sabrina, Phyllis Dixey, Florrie Forde, Gracie Fields, Tommy Fields, Terry Scott, Arthur Askey, Frankie Howerd, Harry Champion, Leon Cortez, Ella Shields, Julie Andrews, Hylda Baker, Arthur Lucan and Kitty McShane in their famous 'Old Mother Riley' act, Ivor Moreton and Dave Kaye, Joe Loss and his Orchestra, Lonnie Donegan, Chris Barber and his Jazz Band, Johnny Dankworth and Cleo Laine, Primo Scala and His Accordion Band, Jimmy James and Eli Woods, Wee Georgie Wood, George Robey, Cicely Courtneidge, Tommy Trinder, Jack Haig, George Martin, Malcolm Sargent conducting the London Philharmonic Orchestra, A. E. Matthews, Chrystabel Leighton-Porter as 'Jane', Robertson Hare, Peter Jeffrey, Clive Dunn, James Beck, Geoffrey Lumsden and Max Miller.

In October 1918 Ellen Terry appeared at the theatre for five evenings as Mistress Page in scenes from ‘’The Merry Wives of Windsor‘’ alongside a full Variety bill.

Peter Sellers appeared at the Hippodrome in February 1948 as a drummer and was billed as "Britain's answer to Gene Krupa". Sellers later described his appearance at the theatre: "I had a crushing defeat in Variety in Aldershot — a terrible thing it was." His complaint was that the band accompanying him were four bars behind as they were eating their sandwiches while they were playing.

According to some sources the actor James Mason made his stage début at the Hippodrome on 23 November 1931 playing Prince Felix Yusupov in a touring performance of Rasputin the Rascal Monk. Other sources, however, claim that this may have happened at the nearby Theatre Royal.

== Decline and demolition ==
The Hippodrome being demolished in 1961

With ever-increasing numbers of people going to the cinema or watching television as an alternative to going to the theatre, audiences began to dwindle in the 1950s when the theatre shifted more towards nude revue. This proved rather lucrative as the nearly all-male audience preferred to sit in the more expensive seats near the stage.

Partly refurbished in 1953, the Hippodrome reopened fitfully under a number of managers until about 1960 and was demolished in 1961 after an unsuccessful campaign to save it. The last show performed there was a repertory production of Dry Rot.

The 1960s office block Hippodrome House occupies the site today.

== See also ==
- Princes Hall
- West End Centre, Aldershot
- Theatre Royal, Aldershot
