= The Ghost Breaker (1922 film) =

1922 film by Alfred Edward Green

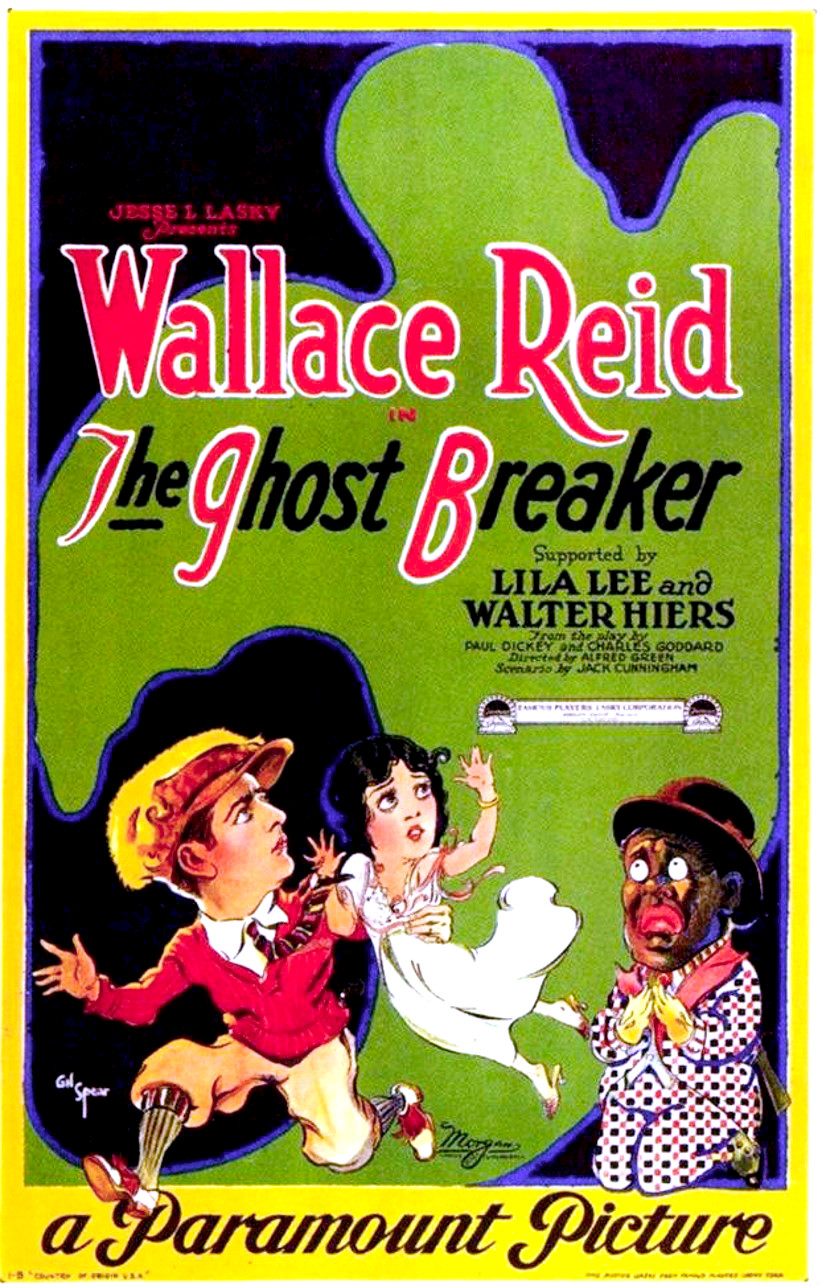
- Film poster
- Directed by: Alfred E. Green
- Written by: Jack Cunningham (adaptation); Walter De Leon (scenario)
- Based on: The Ghost Breaker by Paul Dickey and Charles W. Goddard (play)
- Produced by: Adolph Zukor; Jesse L. Lasky
- Starring: Wallace Reid; Lila Lee; Arthur Edmund Carewe; Snitz Edwards
- Cinematography: William Marshall
- Production company: Famous Players–Lasky
- Distributed by: Paramount Pictures
- Release dates: September 10, 1922 (New York City); October 15, 1922 (United States)
- Running time: 57 minutes
- Country: United States
- Language: Silent (English intertitles)

The Ghost Breaker is a 1922 American silent horror comedy film about haunted houses and ghosts. It was produced by Famous Players–Lasky and distributed through Paramount Pictures. It was directed by Alfred E. Green and starred Wallace Reid in one of his last screen roles. The story, based on the 1909 play The Ghost Breaker by Paul Dickey and Charles W. Goddard, had been released on film in 1914 (bearing the same name), directed by Cecil B. DeMille and Oscar Apfel.

Two of the actors in this film, Snitz Edwards and Arthur Edmund Carewe, later appeared together in the 1925 Lon Chaney silent classic The Phantom of the Opera. Two uncredited "ghosts" in the cast, Mervyn LeRoy and Richard Arlen, later went on to successful film careers.

The Ghost Breaker would be remade in the sound era as The Ghost Breakers (1940) with Bob Hope and Paulette Goddard, and later as Scared Stiff (1953) starring Jerry Lewis and Dean Martin.

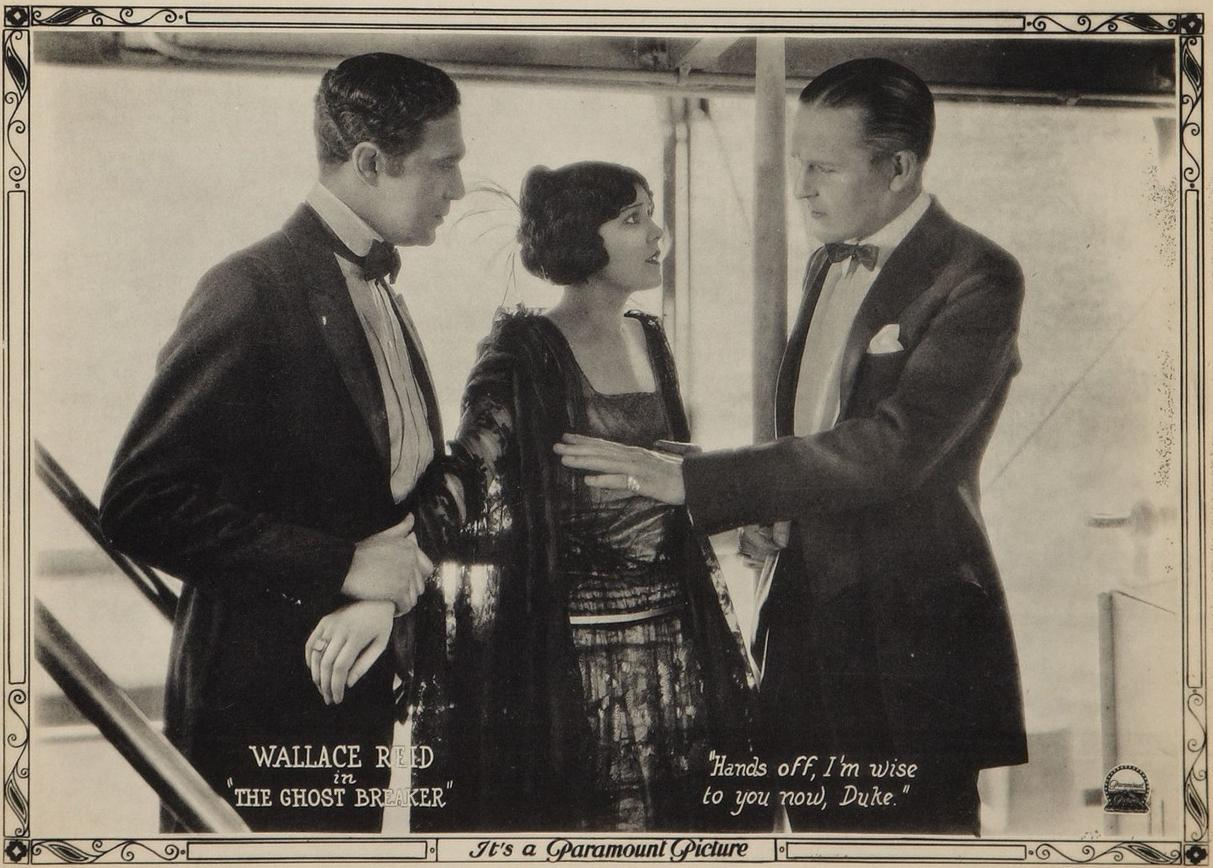
Arthur Edmund Carewe, Lila Lee and Wallace Reid in a scene.

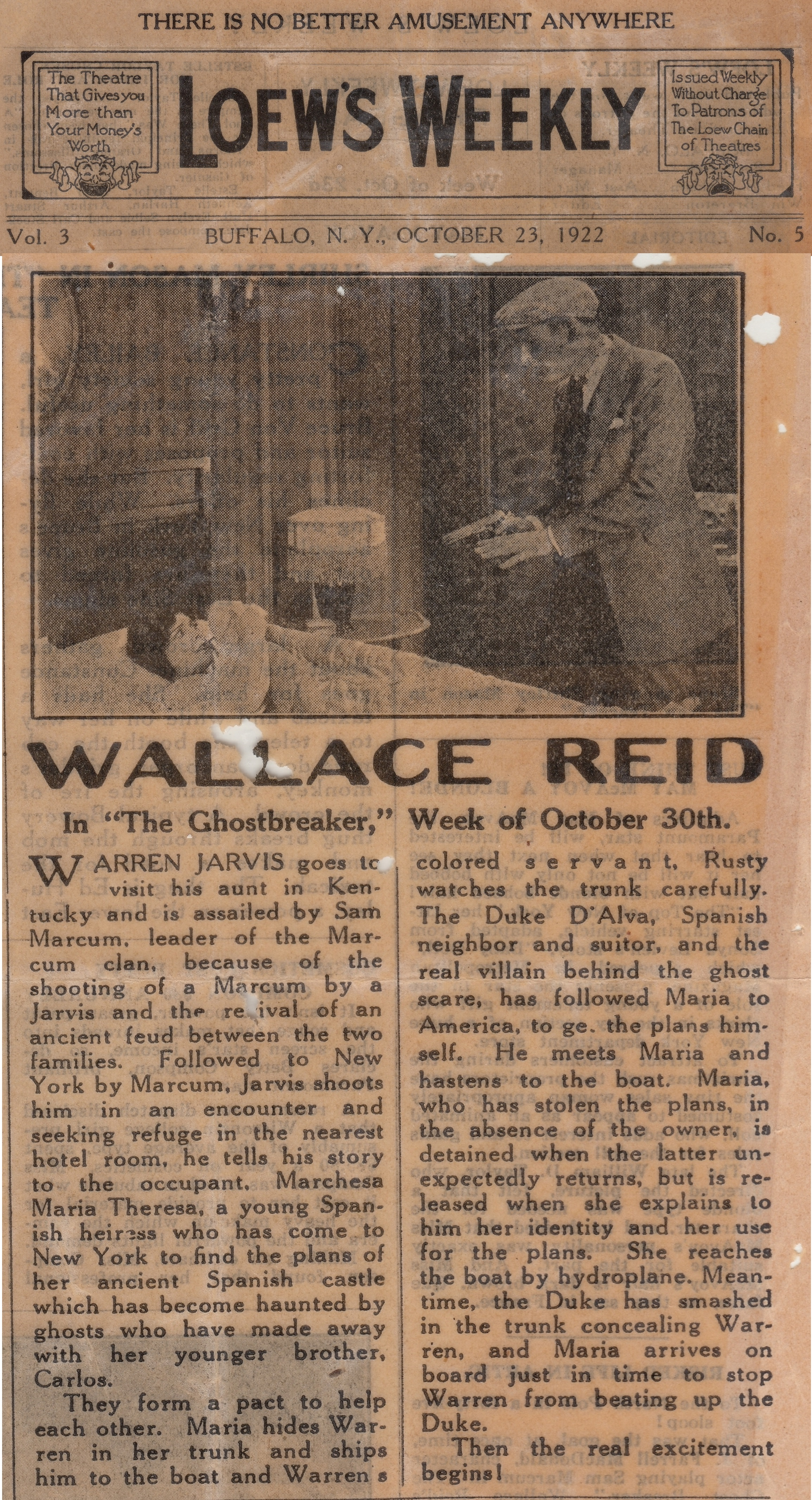
Promotional material in Loew's Weekly program

== Plot ==
Warren Jarvis and his manservant Rusty Snow help a beautiful young heiress named Maria Theresa to rid her father's mansion of ghosts. The spooks turn out to be fakes however, fabricated by the Duke D'Alba to scare the young lady away, thus allowing him to steal her father's hidden gold.

It was possibly a comedy classic especially being helmed by Alfred E. Green and took advantage of the increasing vogue and interest in haunted house melodramas.

== Cast ==
- Wallace Reid as Warren (Walter) Jarvis, ghost breaker
- Lila Lee as Maria Theresa, a Spanish heiress
- Walter Hiers (in blackface) as Rusty Snow, a Negro servant
- Arthur Edmund Carewe as Duke D'Alba, leader of the ghosts
- J. Farrell MacDonald as Sam Marcum, a Kentucky feudist
- Frances Raymond as Aunt Mary Jarvis
- Snitz Edwards as Maurice
- Richard Arlen as A Ghost (uncredited)
- Mervyn LeRoy as A Ghost (uncredited)
- George O'Brien as A Ghost (uncredited)

== Preservation ==
With no prints of The Ghost Breaker located in any film archives, it is considered a lost film. In February 2021, the film was cited by the National Film Preservation Board on their Lost U.S. Silent Feature Films list.

== See also ==
- List of lost films
- Wallace Reid filmography
- Scooby-Doo, Where Are You!
