= Frank Westerton =

English actor (1866–1923)

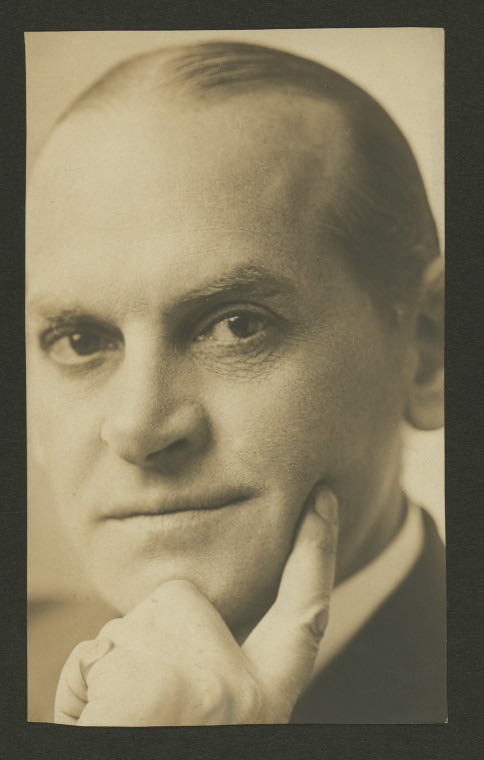
- Westerton c.1922
- Born: Francis Henry Westerton; April 6, 1866; Kensington, London, U.K.
- Died: August 25, 1923 (aged 57); New York City, U.S.
- Occupation: Actor
- Years active: 1880–1922
- Spouse: Madge E. McNulty (m. 1905)

Francis Henry Westerton (6 April 1866 – 25 August 1923) was a British stage and silent film actor of the 19th and early 20th centuries who carved a successful career on Broadway from 1905 to 1922.

== Early career ==
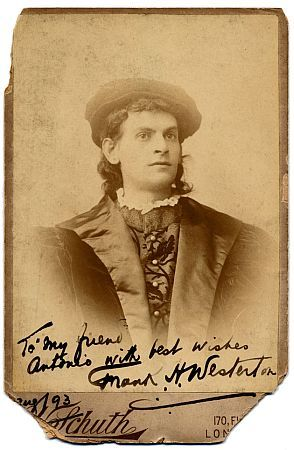
Frank H Westerton c1893

Frank Westerton was born in Kensington in London in 1866, the eldest of five sons of Adelaide née Adkinson (1843–1915) and Samuel John Westerton (1840–1889), a Drysalters Agent. By the time of the 1881 Census the family were living in Liverpool where Westerton is recorded as a Junior Clerk.

Frank Westerton commenced his successful stage career sometime in the late 1880s and in 1891 he was playing opposite Ellaline Terriss in a revival of Arrah-Na-Pogue at the Princess's Theatre in London. Also in 1891 he played Richard Hare in East Lynne at the Royalty Theatre. In 1892 he appeared as Red Mike in The Life We Live at the Princess's Theatre.

For about a decade he was with the theatrical company of Ben Greet. In 1895 he appeared for Greet as Silvius in As You Like It, Ernest Vane in Masks and Faces, Claudio in Much Ado About Nothing, George Hastings in She Stoops to Conquer and Antigonus in The Winter's Tale at the Shakespeare Memorial Theatre in Stratford-upon-Avon. In December 1896 he appeared for Greet as Antigonus in The Winter's Tale at the Theatre Royal in Aldershot in Hampshire. In 1897 during the Ben Greet Season at the Olympic Theatre in London Westerton played Sextus Pompey in Antony and Cleopatra, Gratiano in The Merchant of Venice and Banquo in Macbeth. By 1901 he is listed on the Census as a Theatrical Actor.

== Move to America ==
Westerton first went to the United States in 1902 where he toured in Everyman for The Ben Greet Players and again in Sweet Kitty Bellairs (1903-04) at the Belasco Theatre before moving there permanently, marrying the American actress Madge E. McNulty in Manhattan on 16 February 1905, and joining The Lambs Club in 1906. Westerton appeared regularly on Broadway from 1905 to 1922, making his Broadway début as Bevilaccas, a licensed news-bearer in Adrea (1905) at the Belasco Theatre. Other appearances include The Rose of the Rancho (1906) at the Belasco Theatre; in the farce The Patriot (1908) at the Garrick Theatre; The Scandal (1910) at the Garrick Theatre; in A Lucky Star (1910) at the Hudson Theatre; in the 1910 revival of Raffles, the Amateur Cracksman at the Gaiety Theatre; The Phantom Rival (1914) at the Belasco Theatre; What Money Can't Buy (1915) at the 48th Street Theatre; The Pride of Race (1916) at the Maxine Elliott's Theatre; The Tempest (1916) at the Century Theatre; Rich Man, Poor Man (1916) at the 48th Street Theatre; as Captain Spicer in the musical romance Kitty Darlin' (1917) at the Casino Theatre; as Lieut. Arthur Bennett in Three Faces East (1918) at the Longacre Theatre, and as George Burroughs in the comedy farce The Champion (1921) at the Longacre Theatre. Westerton's final Broadway role was as Edward Harley in It Is the Law (1922) at the Ritz Theatre.

Westerton played Lescaut opposite Lina Cavalieri in the American-made 1914 silent film Manon Lescaut. The film is now considered lost.

Frank Westerton died in New York City in August 1923.
