= Alon Bement =

American painter, arts administrator, author and teacher

- Born: August 15, 1876; Ashfield, Massachusetts, US
- Died: November 22, 1954 (aged 78); New York City, US
- Education: Boston Museum School of Fine Art
- Occupations: artist, educator, author
- Spouse: Katherine Emmet (1914–1954)

Alon Bement (1876–1954) was an American painter, arts administrator, author, and teacher. He served as the dean of Traphagen School of Fashion from 1946 until 1951.

== Early life and education ==
Alon Bement was born on August 15, 1876, in Ashfield, Massachusetts. His family was of French descendant, with a prior name of "Beaumont". His family help found the town of Deerfield, Massachusetts.

Bement graduated from Boston Museum School of Fine Art in 1898, and continued his studies first in Sweden then in Paris at Académie Julian and École des Beaux-Arts, studying under artists Leon Bonnat and Jean-Joseph Benjamin-Constant. In 1902, Bement returned to New York City as a tutor at City College of New York and eventually rising in the ranks to an instructor role. He was married to actress, Katherine Emmet in 1914.

== Career ==
From 1906 until 1919, he was a professor of Fine Arts at the Teachers College, Columbia University. At Columbia University, he worked closely with his colleague Arthur Wesley Dow. Bement was a painter of dazzle (also known as camouflage) and he proposed using dazzle in commercial cargo ships, to reduce loss during the recession of 1919–1920.

In 1920 until 1921, he was a director at Maryland Institute College of Art in Baltimore, Maryland.

In 1925, he became the director of the Art Centre, which was a federation of various art groups located 65 East Fifty Sixth Street in New York City. In 1932, the National Alliance of Art and Industry merged with the Art Centre however Bement continued in his role, eventually leaving in 1938. While at the National Alliance of Art and Industry, he directed a 1936 film We Are All Artists, created in partnership for the Harmon Foundation. The film illustrates the changes in design in the early 20th century through use of classic fine art composition theory.

== Late in life and death ==
From 1943 until 1945 during World War II, Bement moved to Concord, New Hampshire, and served as director of the League of New Hampshire Arts and Crafts, which had at the time 23 campuses across the state.

From 1946 until 1951, Bement moved back to New York City and served as the dean of the Traphagen School of Fashion, where he also taught classes in interior design. Bement additionally served as the director of the radio station WIXAL, Boston. Bement was a member of the Salmagundi Club in New York City, listed in 1907.

Bement died on November 22, 1954, in New York City. He taught many students over the years, most notably was Georgia O’Keeffe who also served as his teaching assistant.

== Bibliography ==
=== Books by Bement ===
- Bement, Alon (2009). The Energetic Line in Figure Drawing. Dover Publications. ISBN 978-0486470122.
- Bement, Alon (2010). Drawing the Human Body: The Art of Figure Construction. Promethean Press. ISBN 9780981020266.
