= The Ghost Breakers =

1940 comedy film directed by George Marshall

- Directed by: George Marshall
- Screenplay by: Walter DeLeon
- Based on: The Ghost Breaker (1909 play) by Paul Dickey and Charles W. Goddard
- Produced by: Arthur Hornblow Jr.
- Starring: Bob Hope; Paulette Goddard; Willie Best; Richard Carlson; Paul Lukas; Anthony Quinn
- Cinematography: Charles Lang
- Edited by: Ellsworth Hoagland
- Music by: Ernst Toch
- Distributed by: Paramount Pictures
- Release dates: June 7, 1940 (Detroit); June 21, 1940 (U.S.)
- Running time: 83 minutes
- Country: United States
- Language: English

The Ghost Breakers is a 1940 American mystery/horror comedy film directed by George Marshall and starring Bob Hope and Paulette Goddard. It was adapted by screenwriter Walter DeLeon as the third film version of the 1909 play The Ghost Breaker by Paul Dickey and Charles W. Goddard.

Along with the Abbott and Costello films Hold That Ghost and Abbott and Costello Meet Frankenstein and Hope and Goddard's own The Cat and the Canary, it is cited as a prime example of the classic Hollywood horror-comedy.

The film is primarily set in an abandoned house in Cuba. A woman has just inherited the house and the associated plantation, and she arrives to inspect her property. Accompanying her is her new love interest, a radio broadcaster from Manhattan. The duo encounters a supposed zombie, and take part in treasure hunting in the abandoned house.

== Plot ==
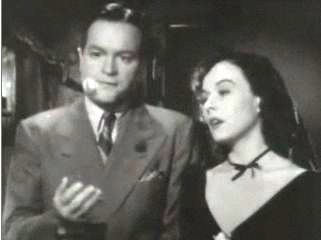
Bob Hope and Paulette Goddard

The film opens in 1940 Manhattan during a violent evening thunderstorm. From a radio studio, broadcaster Larry Lawrence exposes the crimes of underworld boss Frenchy Duval.

In her hotel suite, while listening to the broadcast, Mary Carter is visited by Mr. Parada, a sinister Cuban solicitor. He delivers her the deed to her inheritance—a plantation and mansion in Cuba. Despite Parada's objections, Mary decides to travel there by ship to inspect the property. As Larry finishes his program, he takes a phone call from Frenchy himself, inviting Larry to his hotel. Coincidentally, Frenchy lives on the same floor as Mary.

When Larry arrives, he fires his gun and becomes convinced he killed a man, initially unaware that the actual assailant is further down the hall. Looking for cover, Larry ducks into Mary's suite, where he takes refuge in her large open trunk. Unaware of Larry's presence, Mary locks the trunk and arranges for its transport to the harbor.

At the dock, Larry's valet Alex searches among the luggage and finds Larry. Although not in time to prevent the trunk's transfer to the ship's hold, Alex manages to get on board to extricate his employer before the ship sails. During the trip, Larry and Mary strike up a flirtation. They then meet an acquaintance of Mary's, Geoff Montgomery, a young intellectual who regales them with tales of Caribbean superstitions, particularly voodoo, ghosts, and zombies.

Upon reaching Havana, Larry, and Alex travel to her new island estate. En route, they find a shack occupied by an old woman and her catatonic son, whom they suspect is a zombie. Mary arrives on the island and the three explore the old, abandoned mansion and discover the large portrait of a woman who is a mirror image of Mary. Soon, they are terrorized by a ghost. Then, they encounter the "zombie", whom Alex traps in a closet.

Parada arrives next, but he's fatally stabbed and placed in a casket. Larry and Mary discover him; Parada's last act is to reveal to them access to a secret passage under the house. As the couple draw closer to the lost treasure, Parada's murderer attempts to kill them, but this sets off a trap that causes him to plummet through the basement floor to his death. Larry, Mary, and Alex leave the island after claiming Mary's right to her fortune. As Larry alludes to his plans for his and Mary's eventual honeymoon, the film draws to a close.

== Cast ==
- Bob Hope as Larry Lawrence
- Paulette Goddard as Mary Carter
- Richard Carlson as Geoff Montgomery
- Paul Lukas as Parada
- Willie Best as Alex
- Pedro De Cordoba as Havez
- Virginia Brissac as Mother Zombie
- Noble Johnson as The Zombie
- Anthony Quinn as Ramon Mederos / Francisco Mederos
- Tom Dugan as Raspy Kelly
- Paul Fix as Frenchy Duval
- Lloyd Corrigan as Martin

Uncredited (in order of appearance)

- Jack Norton as Drunk
- Emmett Vogan as Announcer
- Robert Elliott as Lieutenant Murray
- James Flavin as Hotel porter
- Max Wagner as Ship porter
- Paul Newlan as Beggar
- Blanca Vischer as Dolores from Cuba
- Douglas Kennedy as Intern
- Robert Ryan as Intern

== Various versions ==
The Dickey and Goddard play The Ghost Breaker was filmed twice previously by Paramount, first in 1914 by Cecil B. DeMille, with stars H. B. Warner and Rita Stanwood. It was filmed again in 1922 by director Alfred E. Green, starring Wallace Reid and Lila Lee. Both these silent film versions are now considered to be lost films.

The film was adapted for radio on Screen Directors Playhouse on April 4, 1949. Bob Hope re-created his film role, and Shirley Mitchell starred as Mary. Hope appeared again on the program for an hour-long version on June 14, 1951.

George Marshall, director of The Ghost Breakers, remade it as Scared Stiff (1953), featuring Martin and Lewis (Dean Martin and Jerry Lewis). The remake featured cameos not only from Hope, but also from Bing Crosby. A year before Scared Stiff, Martin and Lewis appeared in the Crosby/Hope film Road to Bali. Marshall also directed the not-dissimilar Murder, He Says (1945), in which Fred MacMurray compares the situation to "that Bob Hope movie The Ghost Breakers."

Scenes from the film were used in the 1972 pilot episode of The Snoop Sisters (aka The Female Instinct).

The Ghost Breakers was one of the inspirations for the Ghostbusters series of films, whereby Dan Aykroyd wanted to combine the latest research with The Ghost Breakers style of comedy.

== Reception ==
Reviews from critics were positive. Bosley Crowther of The New York Times wrote, "It looks as though Paramount has really discovered something: it has found the fabled formula for making an audience shriek with laughter and fright at one and (as the barkers say) the simultaneous time." Variety declared it "solid comedy entertainment that will generate plenty of laughs and roll up some hefty b.o. figures along the way." Harrison's Reports called it, "One of the finest ghost stories that have been produced for some time." "Corking comedy has laughs and thrills aplenty," Film Daily reported. John Mosher of The New Yorker wrote, "The amalgam of farce and horror is very successful."

Writing in The Zombie Movie Encyclopedia, Peter Dendle said, "This is considered to be among Bob Hope's finest pictures, and the direction is smooth and the lines delivered flawlessly, but black actor Willie Best's jokes about fried chicken are no longer funny, and smarmy Hope isn't funny to begin with." Glenn Kay, who wrote Zombie Movies: The Ultimate Guide, called it "entertaining and hugely successful", though he said some scenes are uncomfortable due to their political incorrectness. It also contains Hope's oft-cited droll political putdown after hearing a description of roaming dead-eyed zombies: “You mean, like Democrats?”

== See also ==
- List of American films of 1940
