= The Ghost Breaker (1914 film) =

1914 film

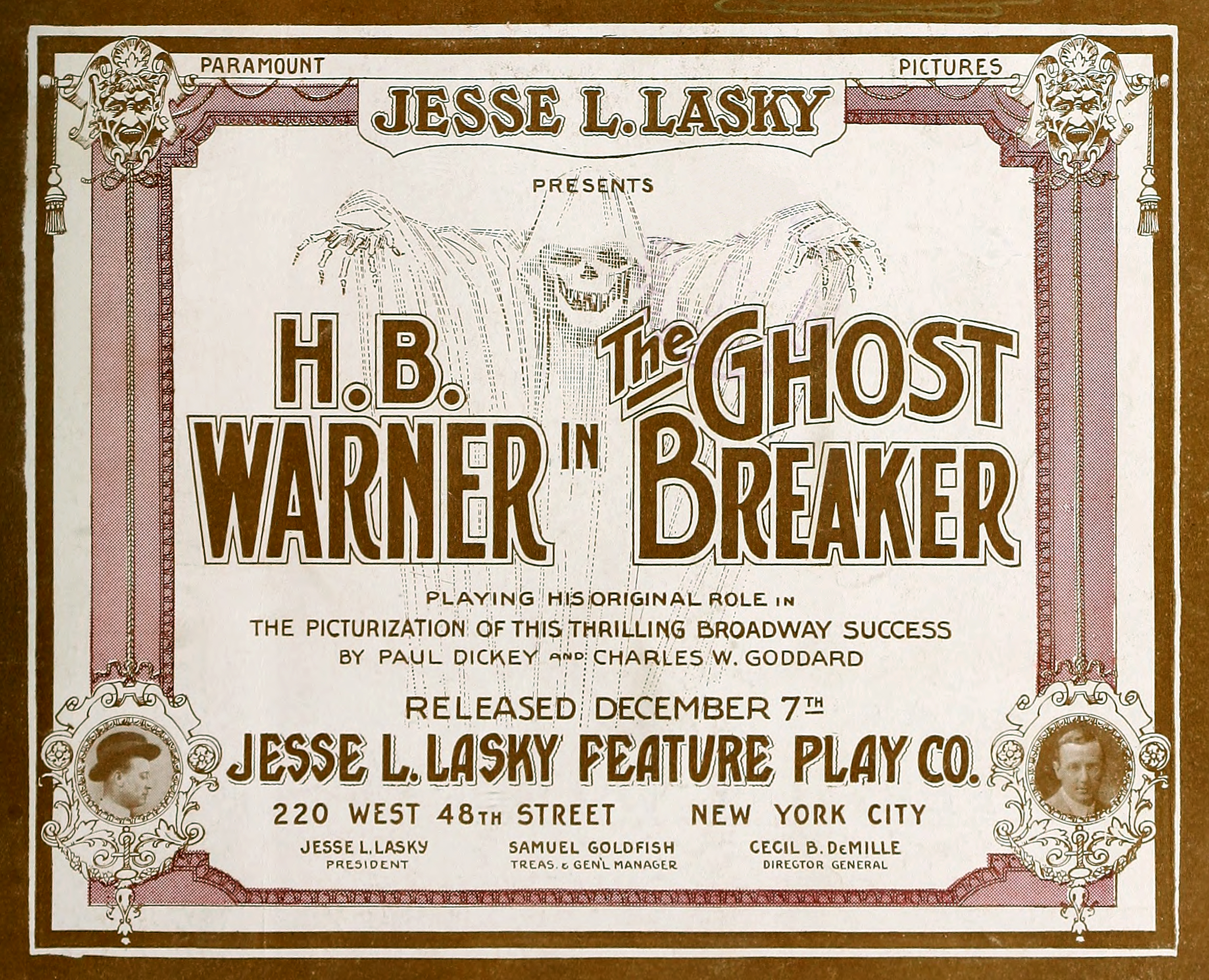
- Promotional art from the front cover of Motion Picture News (December 19, 1914)
- Directed by: Cecil B. DeMille; Oscar C. Apfel
- Written by: Cecil B. DeMille; Oscar C. Apfel; Paul Dickey; Charles W. Goddard; James Montgomery
- Based on: The Ghost Breaker by Paul Dickey and Charles W. Goddard
- Produced by: Cecil B. DeMille; Jesse L. Lasky
- Starring: H. B. Warner
- Distributed by: Famous Players–Lasky; Paramount Pictures
- Release date: December 7, 1914
- Running time: 63 minutes
- Country: United States
- Languages: Silent; English intertitles

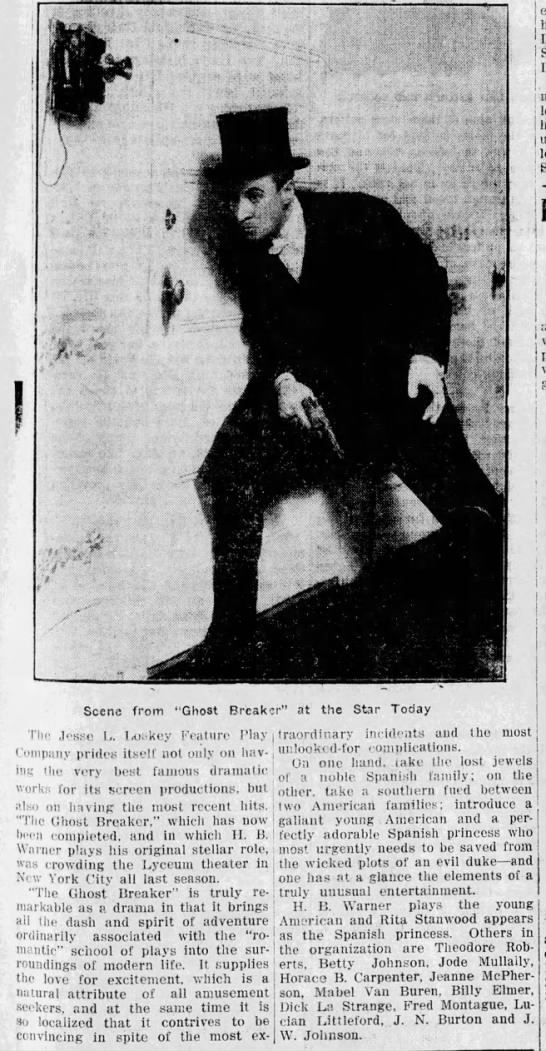
A news clipping from the Modesto Morning Herald containing a review of the Ghost Breaker (April 18, 1915)

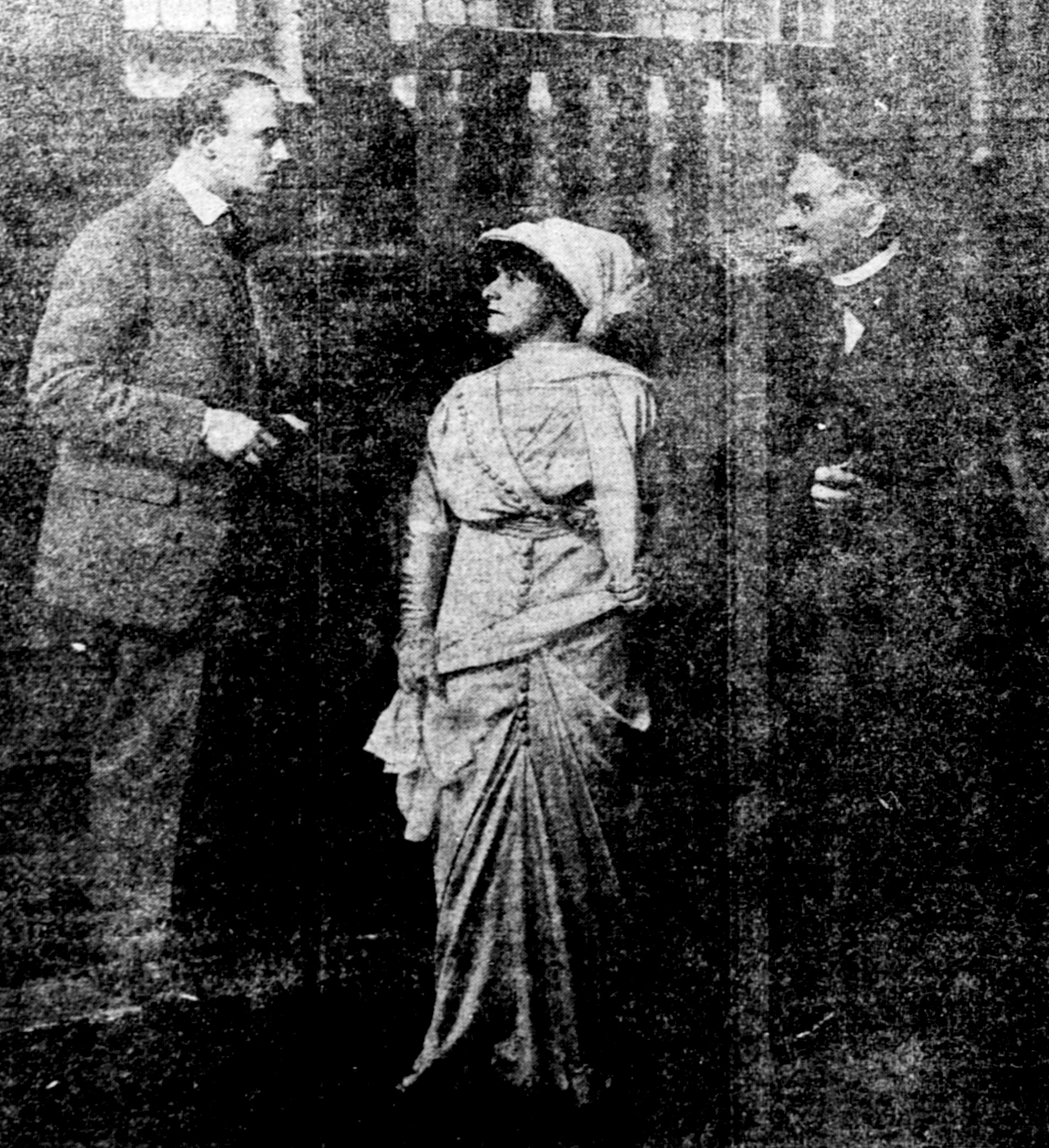
Scene from the film

The Ghost Breaker is a 1914 American silent drama film directed by Cecil B. DeMille and Oscar C. Apfel and based on the 1909 Broadway play of the same name by Paul Dickey and Charles W. Goddard. The film was distributed by Paramount Pictures under the Famous Players–Lasky banner.

The Ghost Breaker was possibly the first film in a long line of haunted-house horror films with the same story. A 1922 remake of the same name starred Wallace Reid and Lila Lee. The original film was also remade as The Ghost Breakers (1940) with Bob Hope and Paulette Goddard, and as Scared Stiff (1953) with Martin and Lewis. The film is now considered lost.

== Plot ==
Somewhere in Spain, Princess Maria Theresa is examining her jewels one day when she accidentally drops a casket causing a secret compartment to open. Within this compartment, she finds an old piece of paper that describes a locket containing a map of a mysterious location. The Princess assumes that it is the way to the Aragon family's lost treasure. She attempts to locate the locket but concludes that it has been stolen. Her maid, Carmencita stole the locket and sold it to an American art dealer named Gains.

Carmencita gets stabbed by Juanita, a jealous rival in love. With her dying breath, Carmencita informs the Princess and Prince what she did with the locket and the search begins. Duke D’Alva eavesdrops on the exchange and decides he wants to find the locket first.

In a town to the south, there is an old feud between two rival families, Jarvis’ family, and Markam's family. This tension eventually leads to Markam killing Warren Javis's father, Judge Jarvis. This causes Warren to follow Markam to New York.

While in New York Markam spots Gains, the art dealer, and purchases the locket from him. The Princess finds Gains and tries to buy the locket back, but it had already been sold. The Duke does the same, so they both set off in search of Markam. The Princess finds Markam first however because she is staying in the same hotel and manages to get the locket from him. Afterward, Jarvis finds and kills Markam as revenge for killing his father. During Jarvis's escape, he bursts into the Princesses room and explains his predicament. She understands and hides Jarvis away in her luggage and he is snuck on board with her as she leaves for Spain. Detectives board the ship in search of Jarvis but cannot find him. Jarvis decides he will help the Princess find the treasure.

Before she left for New York, Princess Maria Theresa's brother and father investigate the castle because that is where they believe the treasure is hidden. The castle is full of fake supernatural spectators conjured by the Duke to scare the royals away from the treasure. The Duke manages to kill the Princess's father and kidnap her brother with his forces.

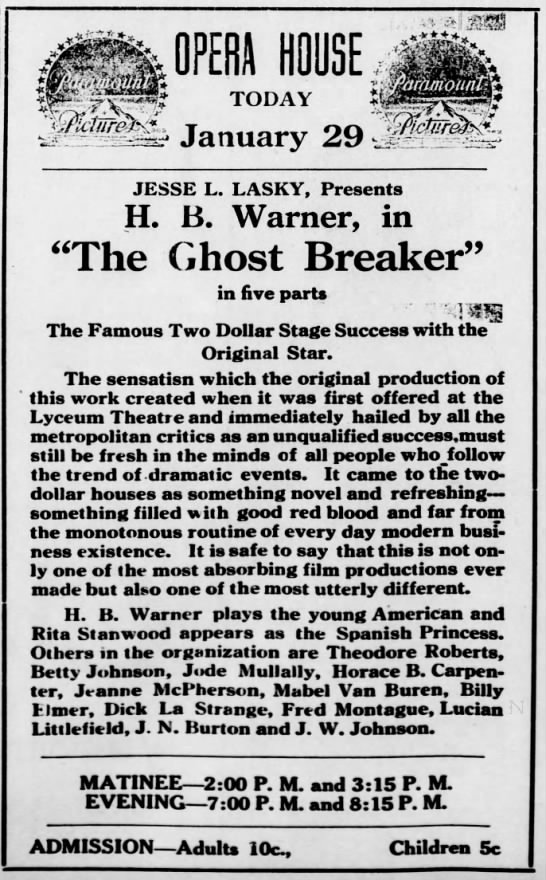
A news clipping from the Danville Morning News containing a promotion for the Ghost Breaker (January 29, 1917)

Jarvis and his servant, Rusty, make it to Spain and quickly make their way to the castle. In the meantime, the Princess is staying at an Inn not too far from the castle. The Duke is able to steal the locket from the Princess's luggage without her knowledge during this time. The Duke then sends his henchman to stop Jarvis before he can get to the castle. He fails to kill Jarvis and instead gets shot in the process. They continue to the castle and encounter a fake ghost inside. It's another one of the Duke's henchmen dressed in a suit of armor. He also meets his end falling through a trapdoor, failing to stop Jarvis and Rusty.

During this, the Prince escapes captivity and takes Jarvis's horse waiting outside the Castle. He quickly informs the police of what's happening and they rush to the castle. As the police try to apprehend the Duke he jumps down a trap trying to escape and dies. The gang finds the treasure during this encounter.

Finally, Jarvis and the Princess confess their mutual feelings towards each other and come together.

== Cast ==
- H. B. Warner as Warren Jarvis
- Rita Stanwood as Princess Maria Theresa
- Theodore Roberts as Prince of Aragon
- Betty Johnson as Carmen
- Jode Mullally as Don Luis
- Horace B. Carpenter as Carlos, Duke D'Alva
- Jeanne McPherson as Juanita, Carmen's Rival
- Mabel Van Buren as Delores
- William Elmer as Robledo
- Richard L'Estrange as Maximo, The Ghost (credited as Dick La Strange)
- Fred Montague as Gaspart, The Ghost
- Lucien Littlefield as Judge Jarvis
- John Burton as Rusty (credited as J.W. Burton)
- Jack W. Johnston as Markam (credited as J.W. Johnson)

== Release ==
The film was released in Wellington, New Zealand, on December 19, 1915, where it followed a week-long run of Fanchon the Cricket.

== Reception ==
After the release of The Ghost Breaker, the film was met with mostly positive reviews, with audiences finding the movie witty and thrilling. Many critics praised H.B. Warner's portrayal of the character Warren Jarvis, so much so that his named was often used in promotions for the film.
