= Scared Stiff (1953 film) =

1953 film by George Marshall

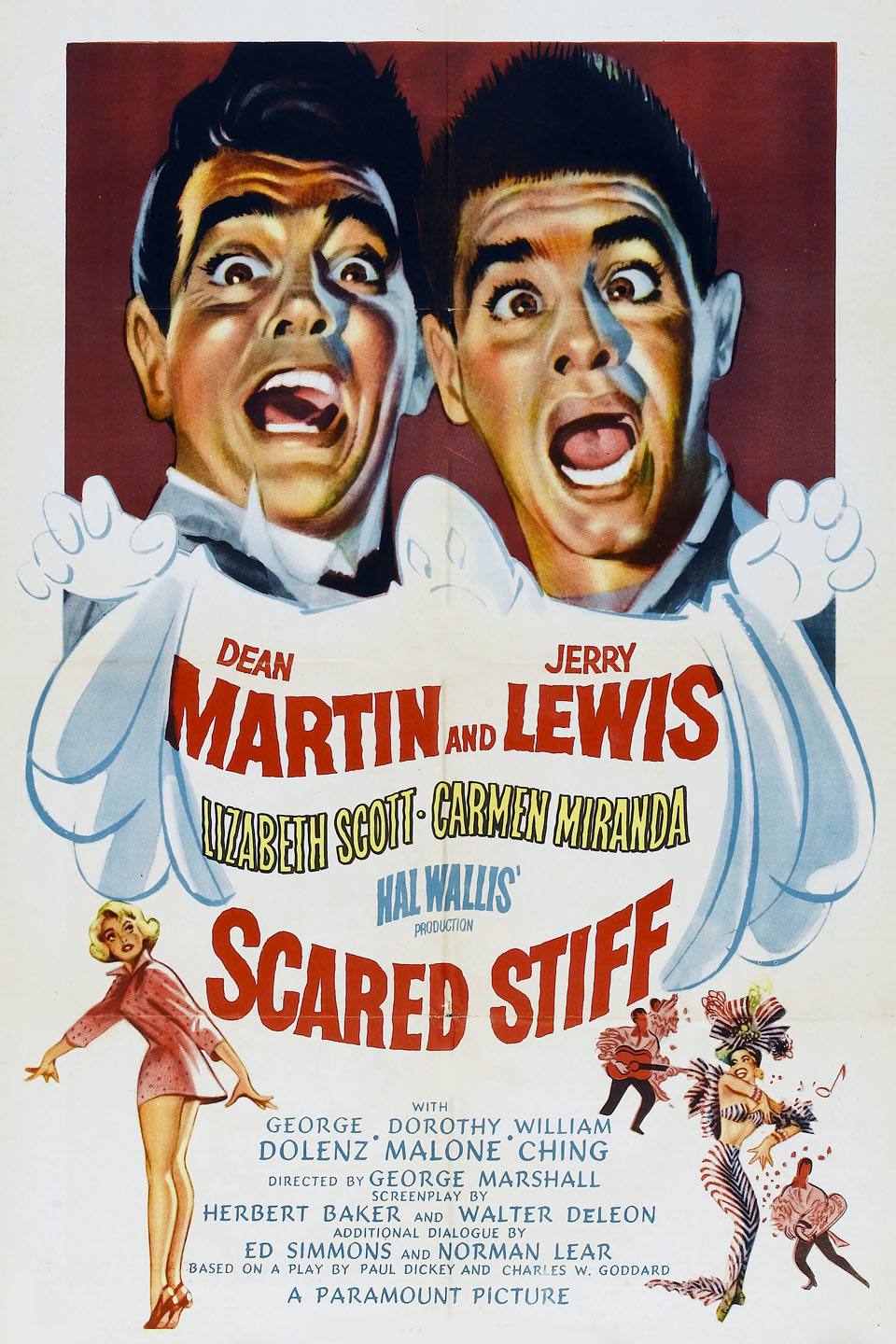
- Theatrical release poster
- Directed by: George Marshall
- Screenplay by: Herbert Baker; Walter DeLeon
- Based on: The Ghost Breaker; 1909 play by Paul Dickey; Charles W. Goddard
- Produced by: Hal B. Wallis
- Starring: Dean Martin; Jerry Lewis
- Cinematography: Ernest Laszlo
- Edited by: Warren Low
- Music by: Leith Stevens
- Distributed by: Paramount Pictures
- Release date: April 27, 1953
- Running time: 108 minutes
- Country: United States
- Language: English
- Box office: $3.5 million (US); 811,256 admissions (France)

Scared Stiff is a 1953 American supernatural fiction-themed comedy horror semi-musical film, directed by George Marshall and starring Dean Martin and Jerry Lewis. One of the 17 films made by the Martin and Lewis team, it was released on April 27, 1953, by Paramount Pictures. It is the fourth screen adaptation of the 1909 play The Ghost Breaker by Paul Dickey and Charles W. Goddard, previously filmed under that title in 1914 and 1922 and as The Ghost Breakers in 1940, also directed by George Marshall and starring Bob Hope.

Scared Stiff was Carmen Miranda's final film appearance, as she died two years later in August 1955.

== Plot ==
Mary Carroll inherits her family's ancestral home, located on a small Caribbean island off Cuba. Despite warnings and death threats, she decides to sail to Havana and take possession of the reputedly haunted castle. She is joined by nightclub entertainer Larry Todd who, believing he has killed a mobster, flees New York with a friend, Myron. Once on the island the three enter the eerie castle and, after viewing the ghost of one of Mary's ancestors and fighting off a menacing zombie, find the key to the castle's treasure.

== Cast ==
- Dean Martin as Larry Todd
- Jerry Lewis as Myron Mertz
- Lizabeth Scott as Mary Carroll
- Carmen Miranda as Carmelita Castinha
- George Dolenz as Mr. Cortega
- Dorothy Malone as Rosie
- William Ching as Tony Warren
- Paul Marion as Ramon Cariso / Francisco Cariso
- Jack Lambert as Zombie
- Tony Barr as Trigger
- Leonard Strong as Shorty
- Henry Brandon as Pierre
- Frank Fontaine as The drunk on the pier
- Lyle Latell as Ship Captain

== Production ==
The team's ninth picture, Scared Stiff is a remake of Paramount's previous effort, The Ghost Breakers, a 1940 "scare comedy" starring Bob Hope and Paulette Goddard, also directed by George Marshall. The property had proven successful for Paramount in decades past including two versions in the silent era: The Ghost Breaker (1914) directed by Cecil B. DeMille and its remake The Ghost Breaker (1922) directed by Alf Green and starring Wallace Reid.

Martin and Lewis had a cameo in Hope and Bing Crosby's Road to Bali the previous year as part of a "comedy trade" between the two teams. In turn, Hope and Crosby appear for a cameo in Scared Stiff. Both shared a common producer, Cy Howard, who produced Martin and Lewis' first two My Friend Irma pictures and That's My Boy. A few years later, Martin and Frank Sinatra appeared in the final scene of the final Hope and Crosby road picture, Road to Hong Kong.

According to Lewis, both he and Martin were against making the picture, as they found the original to be satisfactory. However, because the film was a Paramount property that producer Hal B. Wallis felt was one that could be successful in the comedy team's hands, he held the two to their contract for the film.

Scared Stiff was filmed from June 2 through July 17, 1952. It was the first of the team's films available in 3-track, stereophonic sound. Some reviews at the time commented on the soundtrack's use of stereo to enhance gag sequences. The stereo tracks for this film are now considered lost. As with most films of the team's work, it garnered a re-release in 1958 on a double bill with another Martin and Lewis picture, Jumping Jacks.

Norman Lear was credited with "additional dialogue". It was his first writing credit on a Hollywood film.

Scared Stiff turned out to be the last film for Carmen Miranda who died two years later, shortly after completing an episode of The Jimmy Durante Show on TV. In the film, Jerry Lewis impersonates Miranda and lip syncs one of her signature numbers, "Mamãe Eu Quero".

== Home media ==
Paramount released Scared Stiff on home video in November 1992. The film was included on an eight-film DVD set, the Dean Martin and Jerry Lewis Collection: Volume One, released on October 31, 2006.

== Reception ==
Bosley Crowther of The New York Times wrote, "The nonsense herein contrived is not an inspired presentation of the comic qualities of the two boys." Variety wrote that Martin and Lewis "provide a free-wheeling round of slapstick hilarity". Writing in The Zombie Movie Encyclopedia, academic Peter Dendle called the film an annoying remake that "mostly sticks to the original except for the addition of several bad song and dance numbers and even worse comedy routines".

On Rotten Tomatoes the film holds a rating of 71% based on 7 reviews, with an average rating of 5.83/10.
