= Strongheart (play) =

1904 play by William C. deMille

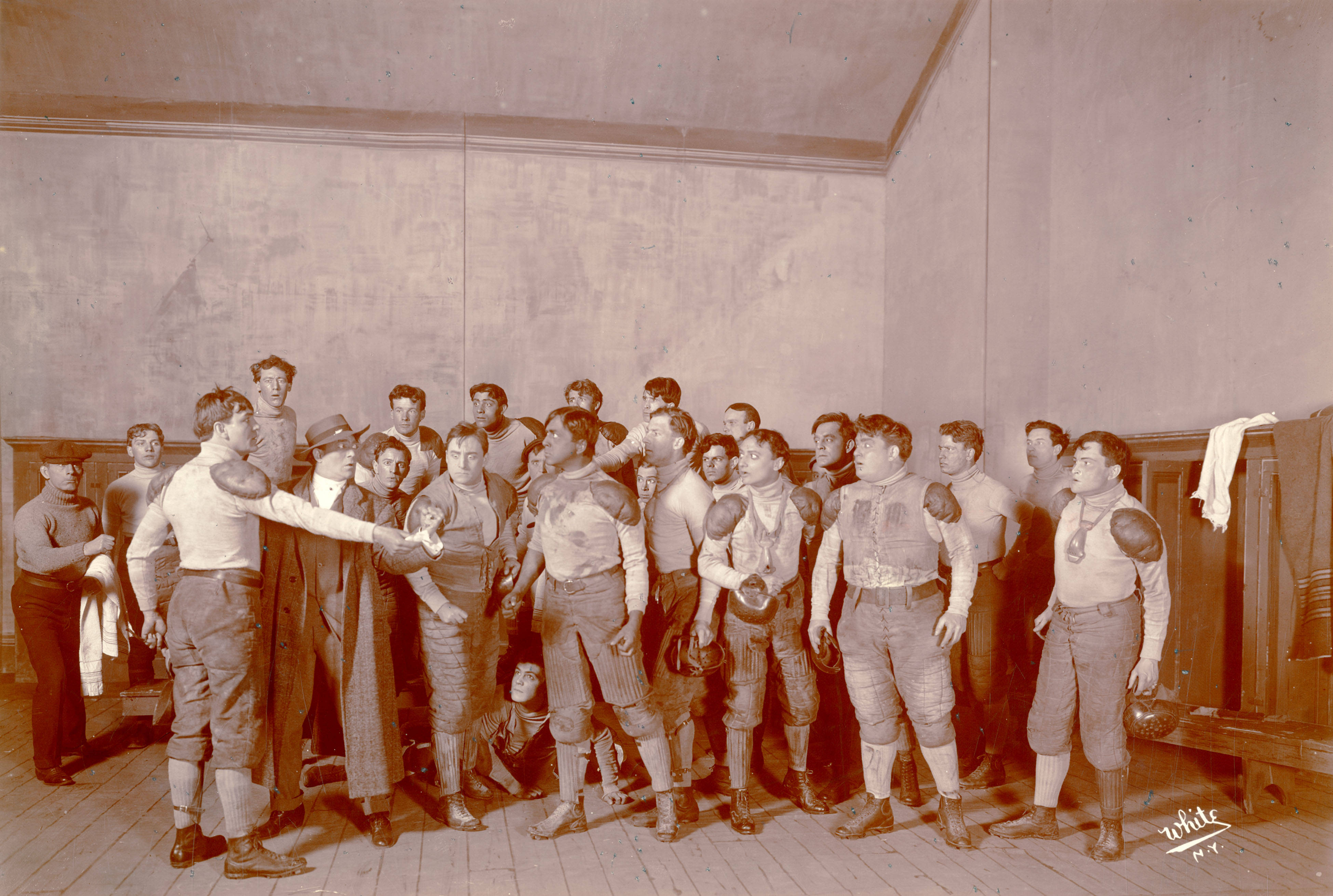
- Original language: English
- Written by: William C. deMille
- Subject: Sports and Race
- Genre: Comedy drama
- Setting: Columbia University dorm and locker rooms; library of Nelson home.

Premiere
- Date: January 30, 1905
- Place: Hudson Theatre
- Directed by: William Harris

Strongheart is a 1904 American play by William C. deMille. It is a comedy drama in four acts, with three settings and twenty characters. The story concerns the eponymous character, a football-playing Native American at Columbia University, who encounters fellowship, racial prejudice, and love. The action of the play takes place on three separate days of the same week. The play was considered to be the first with an educated Native American as the leading character, and a variation on the theme expressed by James Fenimore Cooper in The Last of the Mohicans.

The play was first produced by Henry B. Harris, staged by his father William Harris, with sets by Joseph A. Physioc, and starred Robert Edeson. It had a tryout at St. Paul, Minnesota starting in late December 1904 before premiering on Broadway during January 1905. Reviews considered the play acceptable for the sporting elements, but ranged widely on the chaste romance between Strongheart and a white girl.

The production made a return engagement on Broadway in August 1905, before going on tour of North America, and had a London debut in May 1907. Strongheart served as the basis for a 1914 silent film.

== Characters ==
Characters are listed in order of appearance within their scope.

Lead

- Dick Livingston is a junior halfback from a wealthy family, next to Strongheart the best player on Columbia's team.
- Frank Nelson is a senior, captain of the football team, whose life was saved "out west" by Strongheart.
- Billy Saunders plays center, a senior by courtesy, reliant on Reade's notes to maintain team status.
- Soangataha called Strongheart, is a Carlisle grad; his tribe is paying for his graduate work at Columbia. (Note: From exposition, he is in his second year of graduate work in Political Economy, but evidently is eligible to play on the varsity football team.)

Supporting

- Ross is a freshman who has made the team through grit.
- Taylor is a sophomore.
- Reade is a "grind", a student who actually studies.
- Ralph Thorne is an ethically challenged special teams player, who bets on his own football games.
- Molly Livingston is Dick's sister, the object of Billy's desire.
- Dorothy Nelson is Frank's sister, who encourages Strongheart to persevere at Columbia.

Featured

- Fred Skinner is a loudly-dressed "sporting gent"; that is, an off-campus bookie.
- Mrs. Nelson is Frank and Dorothy's mother.
- Betty Bates is a friend of Molly.
- Maud Weston is a bubblehead friend of Betty.
- Tommy Nash is a backfield player.
- Tad is a "rubber", a physical conditioner.
- Josh is a trainer.
- Buckley is Columbia's coach, and a graduate.
- Farley is the visiting team's manager, who wants a fair game.
- Black Eagle is an elder of Strongheart's tribe who brings a message.

Bit Player

- Butler serves at the Nelson household.
- Allen is a guard, Benton is a tackle; (Note: These characters are not mentioned in the published play, but are on Broadway cast lists.) other football players and subs.

Canine

- Siegfried is the team mascot, a Dachshund belonging to Billy.

== Synopsis ==
Act I (The Columbia dorm room of Frank and Dick. Afternoon.) Ralph Thorne meets Frank Skinner at the empty room. Thorne has bet $3000 with Skinner that Columbia will lose the upcoming game. He based the bet on Strongheart being sidelined due to injury, but now Strongheart has recovered enough to play. Thorne assures Skinner the bet will hold, because he will pass Columbia's signals to the opposing coach, Farley. Skinner asks why Dick Livingston bet $3000 on Columbia to win. Thorne explains it was because he had beaten Dick in poker for that amount, then suggested the bet as a way to recoup his losses before his father found out. Thorne liked the same girl as Dick, and wanted to nobble his rival. Skinner hightails it when Dick, Frank Nelson, and other students come back to the room to prepare for entertaining. Billy tells Reade he needs to keep his class notes a little longer. Strongheart arrives, to be mockingly salaamed by the others as their great chief. Strongheart is undisturbed; he knows this is the boys' way of compensating for their secret admiration of his academic and athletic prowess. Dorothy Nelson, Mollie Livingston, and their friends arrive for afternoon tea. With Mrs. Nelson to chaperone and remedy the amateur attempt to make tea, the get together is a success. Meanwhile, Thorne has switched the list of signals Dick wrote out with his own copy. Excited to meet the exotic Strongheart at last, Maud Weston flusteredly asks him how he likes America. Strongheart replies that his people like it just fine. (Curtain)

Act II (Columbia football team's locker room at the Polo Grounds. Two days later.) At halftime in the big game, the Columbia players straggle into the locker room, having failed to score. Their coach Buckley encourages and excoriates them, pitching his speech to the team as a whole, while tailoring asides to individual players. At Strongheart's suggestion he blisters the freshman Ross. Strongheart knows that righteous anger will stimulate Ross to inspired effort. Their conference is interrupted by Farley's entrance, holding the list of signals he was given anonymously. Farley wants a fair game, so he has brought the list to Buckley. Strongheart sees the list is in Dick's handwriting, but he himself is accused of the treachery by Thorne. Frank as captain decides to bench him for the second half. Strongheart stays in the locker room with Tommy Nash, who has been injured. He looks out the window (Note: Though locker rooms seldom have windows, the conceit here is that it is located on an upper floor enabling privacy and affording Strongheart a view out over the field.) to follow the game, describing it for Nash, until at last his triumphantly exclaims "We win! We Win!". (Curtain)

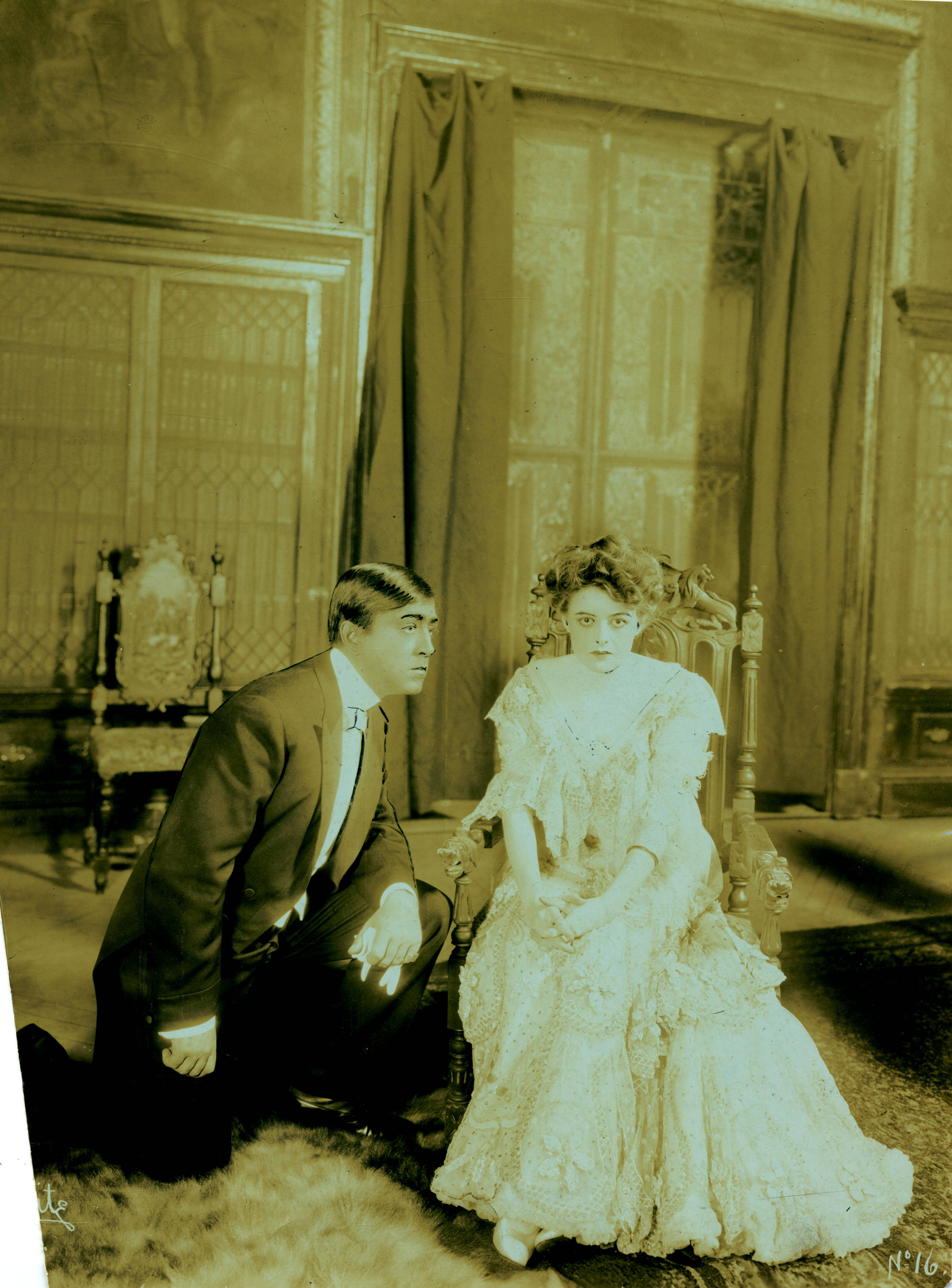

Act III (The library of the Nelson family home. Evening of the same day.) At a formal victory celebration, the boys dance with the girls in the Nelson's ballroom, while the library serves for more clandestine rendezvous. Molly advises a worried Dorothy to marry Strongheart if he asks, and don't let his race stop her. Dick asks Frank's permission to propose to his sister Dorothy, since their father is dead. Frank readily gives it. Billy accuses Molly of having sent the signals list he gave her to Farley. Strongheart clears up that misconception, but Molly will not accept Bill's apology yet. Strongheart asks Dorothy for the next dance, but explains they will have to sit it out, since the government won't allow him to dance. (Note: This is a wry reference to the Ghost Dance War, and nothing to do with ballroom dancing. Strongheart simply wants to get Dorothy alone to propose to her.) Strongheart tells Dorothy of his love for her, and she asks him to come back tomorrow for her answer. Strongheart confronts Thorne over the signals list, but is distracted by his asserting Frank and Dick will deny him a chance with Dorothy. Thorne is right; Frank and Dick are incensed when Strongheart says he has proposed to Dorothy. The call him a traitor, and Dick further accuses him of betraying the team. Even when Strongheart reveals the list is in Dick's handwriting, Dick says he stole it. When Dorothy chides her brother for discourtesy, he holds her back as Strongheart leaves their house, saying he will return for her answer tomorrow. (Curtain)

Act IV (Same as Act III. Afternoon of the next day.) Billy and Molly make up and he proposes. The team has gathered and Strongheart proves that Thorne sent the list to Farley, then prevents the others from attacking him. Thorne exits, ostracized from the team. The other team members congratulate Strongheart then go with Frank to have some dinner, but Dick hangs back. He apologizes to Strongheart for his harsh words of last night, but says they cannot be friends. Even so, they shake hands. Billy returns to hear Strongheart softly say "And I thought I was one of them". The Butler now announces a visitor to see Strongheart. Black Eagle has come from the West: Strongheart's father has died, and his people now require him to return home. As they have paid for his post-graduate work, he feels obligated to obey their wishes. He informs Black Eagle that he may be bringing Dorothy as his wife, but is startled when the elder reacts as negatively as Frank and Dick. Black Eagle is angry that Soangataha would choose a woman not of his own people for a wife. He says how can you ask a white woman to live as we do? Dorothy has overheard his words. She proclaims her love for Strongheart and will go with him, but he realizes he cannot ask this of her. They agree to part, despite their love. Left alone, Strongheart raises his hands overhead and prays for help from the Great Spirit of his people, saying he is alone in a desert. (Curtain)

== Original production ==
=== Background ===
Robert Edeson was determined to appear only in American dramas, at a time when American stages mounted mainly European works by choice. (Note: The preference for European over American works was so widespread that the American Dramatists' Club suggested Congress should impose a 10% tax on gross receipts of foreign plays produced in the United States.) William C. deMille was a professor of English at Columbia University when Edeson and his producer-manager Henry B. Harris asked him to write a play with a Native American (Note: Nearly all sources cited in this article, including the published play, employed the term "Indian" to refer to indigenous inhabitants of North America.) as "a vital factor". It reportedly took deMille two years to complete the play. It was presented to Harris and Edeson at Boston in September 1904, at which time the title Strongheart was chosen, over a suggested alternative of Classmates. Edeson said "I think it will be the first time that an educated Indian will be the hero of a play".

DeMille made clear in an interview that he never contemplated letting the romance between Strongheart and Dorothy Nelson go beyond verbal expressions of love. He couldn't countenance a marriage of the two characters, and insisted other dramatists he consulted agreed with the ending. DeMille also emphasized there was no embrace between Strongheart and Dorothy in the play. Another report of the same interview quoted deMille as saying: "No matter how strongly an American's reason tells him that the colored man or the Indian in any particular case is deserving of all happiness, even to the winning of the white woman he loves, no one of us is quite willing that the white woman should be our sister".

Strongheart came out at a time when college football was growing popular with the general public, and the Native American players of Carlisle were achieving surprising results against much larger and far wealthier schools. Edeson lamented to Burns Mantle that he and Harris had Strongheart in hand for two years, but when finally it was stage ready, "along came George Ade with The College Widow and another football scene".

Rehearsals for the production were held in St. Louis during Christmas week 1904. During this time, producer Henry B. Harris came down with malaria, and eventually had to be sent back to New York to recover.

=== Cast ===
Cast from the Minnesota tryouts through the Broadway run. The production was on hiatus from January 8 through January 29, 1905.
Role	Actor	Dates	Notes and sources
Dick Livingston	Henry Kolker	Dec 29, 1904 - Mar 18, 1905	
Dick Livingston	Frank Gheen	Mar 20, 1905 - Mar 25, 1905	Edeson and Harris brought on four new cast members during the final week on Broadway.
Frank Nelson	Francis Bonn	Dec 29, 1904 - Mar 25, 1905	
Billy Saunders	Herbert Corthell	Dec 29, 1904 - Mar 25, 1905	
Strongheart	Robert Edeson	Dec 29, 1904 - Mar 25, 1905	
Ross	Richard Sterling	Dec 29, 1904 - Mar 25, 1905	
Taylor	Macey Harlam	Dec 29, 1904 - Mar 25, 1905	
Reade	Taylor Holmes	Dec 29, 1904 - Mar 25, 1905	
Ralph Thorne	Sydney Ainsworth	Dec 29, 1904 - Mar 25, 1905	
Molly Livingston	Louise Compton	Dec 29, 1904 - Mar 18, 1905	A Chicago society girl named L. C. Kittredge, this was her second play since being signed by Henry B. Harris.
Molly Livingston	Louise Drew	Mar 20, 1905 - Mar 25, 1905	
Dorothy Nelson	Dallas Tyler	Dec 29, 1904 - Jan 07, 1905	
Dorothy Nelson	Percita West	Jan 30, 1905 - Mar 18, 1905	Producer Henry B. Harris announced West would take over this role after the tryouts.
Dorothy Nelson	Marie Boland	Mar 20, 1905 - Mar 25, 1905	Boland used Marie, her birthname, for billing during her first ten years (1897–1906) on the stage.
Fred Skinner	F. A. Turner	Dec 29, 1904 - Mar 25, 1905	
Mrs. Nelson	Jane Rivers	Dec 29, 1904 - Mar 25, 1905	
Betty Bates	Marjorie Wood	Dec 29, 1904 - Mar 25, 1905	
Maud Weston	Percita West	Dec 29, 1904 - Jan 07, 1905	
Maud Weston	Jeanne Madeira	Jan 30, 1905 - Mar 18, 1905	Madeira was taken on when West was promoted to a supporting role.
Maud Weston	Lucille Stanford	Mar 20, 1905 - Mar 25, 1905	
Tommy Nash	Harrison Ford	Dec 29, 1904 - Mar 25, 1905	
Tad	Charles Sturgis	Dec 29, 1904 - Mar 25, 1905	
Josh	Lawrence Sheehan	Dec 29, 1904 - Mar 25, 1905	
Buckley	Edmund Breese	Dec 29, 1904 - Mar 25, 1905	
Farley	Madison Smith	Dec 29, 1904 - Mar 25, 1905	Smith had been a varsity tackle for the Columbia football team of 1900.
Black Eagle	E. W. Morrison	Dec 29, 1904 - Jan 07, 1905	
Black Eagle	Edmund Breese	Jan 30, 1905 - Mar 25, 1905	After the tryouts, Breese was doubled up in this role while still playing Buckley.

=== Tryouts ===
The play's first tryout occurred at the Metropolitan Theatre in St. Paul, Minnesota on December 29, 1904. It was the fourteenth anniversary of the opening of this venue, and a rare production debut for this city. A local reviewer reported the play was "strong" and received enthusiastically by the large audience. However, they questioned the ending, saying the average tribal member doesn't care whether their chief has a wife or not, and certainly not what color she is. They conclude: "Where is the harm in the marriage of a white girl to an Indian when that Indian is educated, refined, and by far a better and stronger man than any of his white associates?" Another critic complained of the lack of sympathetic appeal for Strongheart in Edeson's interpretation, suggesting the easygoing banter of the other football players rendered him stodgy and humorless by comparison, a "man who had learned the English language from a schoolmaster rather than his mother". This same critic reinforced their view with a second column two days later, and went on in a more virulent manner: "There is something repellent in the spectacle of a full-blooded American Indian declaring his love for a white girl. You can scarcely applaud her for consenting to marry him, though you can readily sympathize with his love for her." And again, "There is something repulsive in the union of a white woman and a black man. The Indian, to be sure, is not a negro, but neither is he a Caucasian".

From St. Paul, the company moved to the Metropolitan Theater in Minneapolis, where they first presented an older work, Ranson's Folly. Strongheart was performed in Minneapolis starting January 5, 1905. A reviewer for The Minneapolis Star Tribune thought Robert Edeson was growing into stardom with this role, and was enthusiastic about Edmund Breese as Coach Buckley, a type of character new to the stage. However, although they said Dallas Tyler as Dorothy Nelson was "a pleasing personality", they also labelled her as "colorless" and "conventional". After the tryouts in Minnesota finished, the production went back to New York. They rehearsed at the Hudson Theatre during the daytime, as Ethel Barrymore was playing in Sunday during the evenings. Strongheart would premiere at that venue after her engagement closed on January 28, 1905.

=== Broadway premiere and reception ===
Strongheart had its Broadway premiere at the Hudson Theatre on January 30, 1905. Reviews acknowledged the racial theme but most avoided expressing opinions about it. Instead, they concentrated on the college sports environment of the play, and reported the enthusiastic reception of the first night audience. Both deMille and Edeson were required to give curtain speeches. One critic dismissed the racial dilemma by citing the precedent of James Fenimore Cooper's Uncas in The Last of the Mohicans. The Evening World critic thought the play's depiction of college students and football much closer to real life than that of George Ade's The College Widow. But they also thought the character of Strongheart as a Columbia college student "overdrawn" and "improbable". The reviewer for The Sun was an exception who focused on the race theme in the play. They identified racial prejudice as an inherent trait of "every tribe of human beings", and said the "play has not a happy ending but one that is true".

During the final week of its Broadway engagement, four new actors who would accompany the subsequent tour were brought into the cast. These were Marie Boland in the role of Dorothy Nelson, Louise Drew as Molly Livingston, Frank Gheen as Dick Livingston, and Lucille Stanford as Maud Weston.

=== Broadway closing ===
The production closed its first Broadway run on March 25, 1905, at the Hudson Theatre. It immediately headed for Boston to start touring on March 27, 1905, at the Park Theatre there. Strongheart would have a limited return engagement on Broadway at the Savoy Theatre in August 1905, and a West End premiere at the Aldwych Theatre in May 1907.

== Adaptations ==
=== Film ===
- Strongheart (film) - Released in March 1914.

== Bibliography ==
- William C. DeMille. Strongheart: A Comedy Drama in Four Acts. Samuel French, 1909.
