= Renee Harris =

American theatre producer and Titanic survivor (1876–1969)

- Renee Harris in 1923
- Born: Irene Wallach; June 15, 1876; Washington, D.C., U.S.
- Died: September 2, 1969 (aged 93); New York City, U.S.
- Resting place: Ferncliff Cemetery, Westchester County, New York
- Other name: René
- Occupations: Theatre producer and manager
- Known for: RMS Titanic survivor; Manager of Hudson Theatre
- Spouse: Henry B. Harris (m. 1899; died 1912) Leon Leslie Consolloy (m. 1916; div. 1918) Zack M. Barber (m. 1922; div. 1923) L. Marvin Simmons (m. 1925; div. 1928)
- Relatives: William Harris Sr. (father-in-law); William Harris Jr. (brother-in-law)

Irene Wallach "Renee" Harris (June 15, 1876 – September 2, 1969) was an American theatrical manager and producer who was one of the first female theatre managers in the United States, taking over the management of the Hudson Theatre. Harris was interested in the theater, but had no experience with it other than as a patron. While attending a matinée, she met her husband, the noted theatrical manager and producer Henry B. Harris. The two had a whirlwind courtship, with Harris assisting her husband in his work even before the marriage. Through their work together, Harris learned about both theater management and theatrical production. Her husband said that she was competent enough to take over his business if anything happened to him.

The couple owned New York theaters and large homes, and traveled extensively for both business and pleasure. They had taken an extended journey through Europe and North Africa and were returning to the United States after finalizing some theatrical business in London. The Harrises were sailing on the maiden voyage of the new White Star liner, RMS Titanic. When the ship began sinking, Harris wanted to stay with her husband. Despite being injured by a fall, she climbed out of the first lifeboat she was placed in before it was lowered into the water. Harris finally left Titanic fifteen minutes before the liner sank.

She returned to New York a widow and decided to continue her husband's business because she felt it was what he would have wanted. With the help of her father-in-law, Harris was able to successfully keep the business going. When her husband's will was settled, she learned there were more debts than assets. Her father-in-law advised her to close the business but Harris felt this would be an insult to his name and memory. She threw herself into hard work and was able to pay her husband's debts.

After these bills were paid, Harris enjoyed enough success to afford the lifestyle she had led before Titanic. In the course of her theater work, she discovered people such as Barbara Stanwyck, Mae Clarke, and playwright Moss Hart. But the stock market crash of 1929 and the subsequent depression meant the end of her assets and brought hard times to all in the entertainment industries. Later in life, Harris became friends with Walter Lord and helped with his book A Night to Remember and was involved in the subsequent film based on the book. She died in 1969 at age 93.

== Early years and marriage ==
She was born Irene Wallach on June 15, 1876, in Washington, D.C. (Note: Harris did not use the correct year of her birth for her passport application.) She was the daughter of Philip and Rachel (Hilzheim) Wallach. Harris was the seventh of nine children in the large Jewish family. Her father owned a jewelry store next to the Willard Hotel; he died when Harris was six years old and her mother took in boarders to support the family. Several boarders worked as secretaries in various government offices and it was suggested to Harris that she take secretarial training. Harris followed the suggestion and got a job in a Tennessee congressman's office where she worked for three years.

By age 22, Harris had moved to New York City, where she studied law and worked as a legal secretary. She had an interest in the theater, attending as many performances as she was able. Harris was attending a matinee when she felt someone's hand on the back of her neck. Surprised, she quickly turned around and found theatrical producer Henry B. Harris behind her. Her intentions were to speak sternly to the offender, but she changed her mind when she saw his kind eyes and pleasant smile.

Despite a ten-year difference in their ages, the producer and the law student had an interest in the theater in common. Mr. Harris discovered she had a keen sense of the theatrical world and soon was asking her to help him by reading plays and attending rehearsals. The couple met in August 1899 and married on October 22, 1899, at Harris' sister's home in New York. After the marriage, the couple moved into an apartment in New York's Wellington Hotel, where Harris met Evelyn Nesbit, who was also living there. She also met Lillie Langtry when she was on a tour of the United States; Mr. Harris was serving as her manager for the tour. When the Harrises visited London in 1906, Langtry introduced them to King Edward, who invited them to be his guests in the Royal Box at Epsom Downs. (Note: Langtry had a romance with the King when he was Prince of Wales,)

Harris' husband was the son of noted theatrical producer William Harris Sr. He worked for his father before going into business on his own in 1901. The couple owned New York theaters, large homes and traveled extensively. Harris considered herself spoiled by her husband. She said her husband had taught her everything she knew about the theater, Mr. Harris was so sure of his wife's abilities, he once told Edgar Selwyn, "I never take an important step without consulting Renee. If anything happened to me, she could pick up the reins."

After a long continental holiday which began in late 1911 and included a journey to North Africa, the couple was returning to the United States. While in England, Mr. Harris combined business with pleasure. He had signed Rose Stahl to appear in Maggie Pepper and would bring the production to London in May. He also began working with motion pictures; during his London visit, he had secured the US rights for the British full-color film The Miracle. Mr. Harris wired his associate, Charles Klein, that he and Renee would be sailing on the maiden voyage of the new White Star liner RMS Titanic. The thought of this was so upsetting to Klein, he wired back, pleading with his friend not to sail on the ship. Mr. Harris replied to Klein by wire saying it was too late to make any changes. (Note: Three years later, Charles Klein died in the sinking of the Lusitania.)

== Titanic ==
Titanic made her way out of the port of Southampton on April 10, 1912. As she was being guided into the harbor, the giant ship caused a large displacement of water which made the moored SS City of New York swiftly rise and fall. The motion snapped the mooring cables tethering the New York and the ship began moving toward Titanic. A collision was narrowly averted when one of the tugboats assisting Titanic was able to get a line on the New York; the tugboat then towed the wayward ship out of the path of the Titanic. The two ships were between three and four feet apart before the New York was able to be halted. Harris was at the rail of Titanic watching the efforts to stop the New York when a stranger came up to her and asked, "Do you love life?" Harris replied that she did; the stranger went on, "That was a bad omen. Get off this ship at Cherbourg, if we get that far. That's what I'm going to do."

On April 14, Harris slipped and fell on one of the Titanic staircases. She fractured her right elbow and was in some pain as a result of her injury. Harris and her husband later went to dinner but retired to their cabin early, where they were playing double Canfield. The cabin's closet door had been left open and Harris was watching her clothing swinging quickly on their hangers. At dinner, there had been talk of icebergs in the region and she thought it odd that the ship was moving so fast under those conditions. The hangers suddenly stopped moving. Everyone was told to put on life jackets and come on deck within a short period of time. Mr. Harris helped his wife dress warmly and put her jewelry in his pockets for safe keeping.

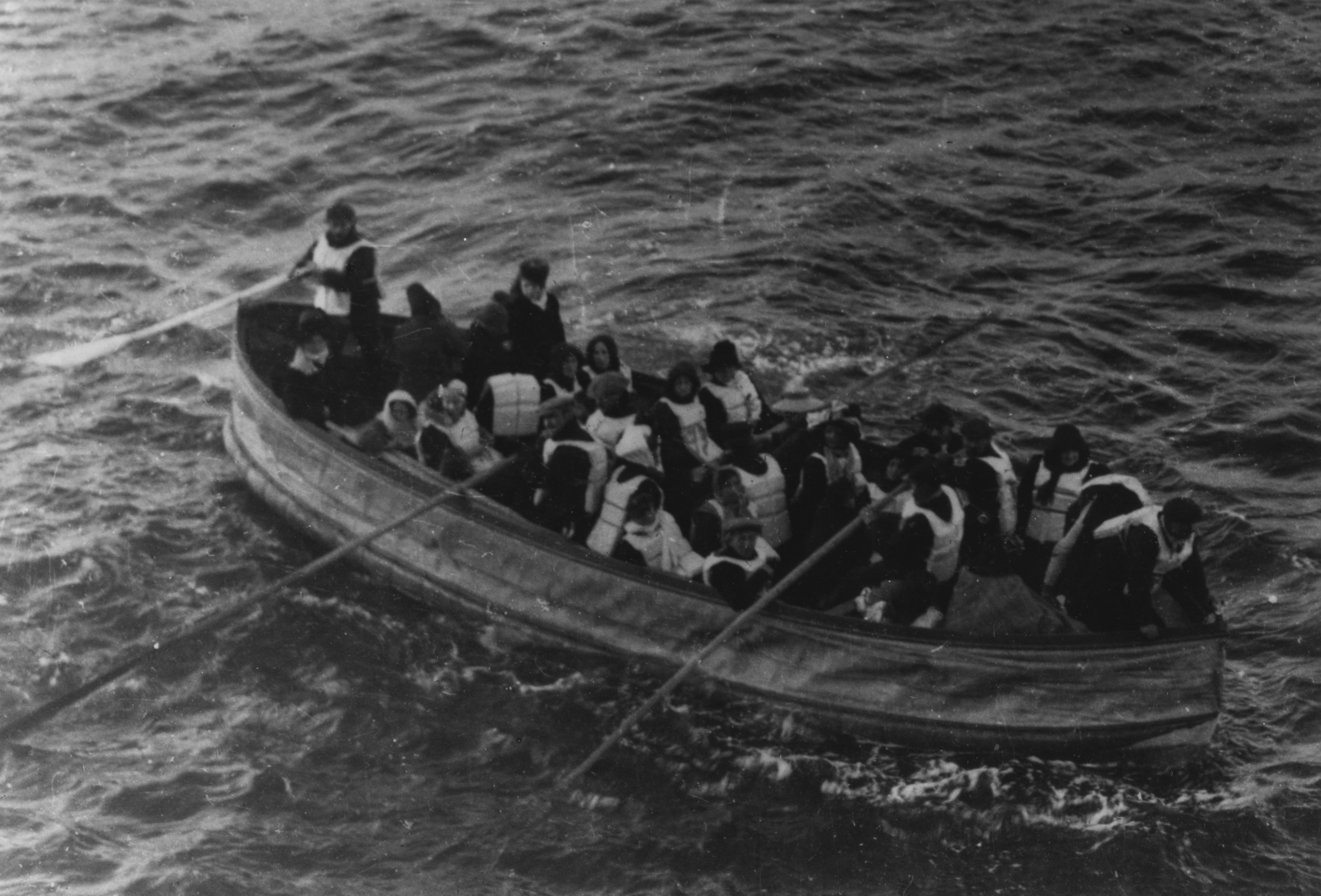
Harris was a passenger in Collapsible D after leaving the Titanic.

The Harrises along with Mr. and Mrs. Emil Taussig made their way to the main deck. After the women had been seated in a lifeboat, there were still some vacant seats. When Mr. Harris and Mr. Taussig both tried to accompany their wives, they were threatened with revolvers. The boat was lowered with those seats still vacant. (Note: Mrs. Taussig and her daughter left Titanic on this lifeboat. Mr. Taussig perished on the ship.) Harris wanted to leave the ship with her husband; despite her broken elbow, she was able to leave the lifeboat before it was lowered into the water. Harris continued her refusals to leave her husband aboard Titanic until Captain Edward Smith told her she was denying her husband the chance to save himself by her refusal to board a lifeboat. He claimed Titanic had many rafts in its stern and that the men would have an opportunity at them when the women had left the ship. She remained aboard Titanic until the last boat to be successfully, Collapsible Boat D, was filled. Fifteen minutes after it was lowered, the ship sank.

Three Titanic crewmembers accompanied the passengers of the lifeboat, but only one man was able to do any work at rowing the boat. Most of the women aboard were also unable to help at rowing, so Harris and another female passenger had to work at rowing the lifeboat along with the Titanic crew member. Despite their efforts, the lifeboat took on water and continued to sink deeper into the sea. About a half-hour before the arrival of the rescue ship RMS Carpathia, Titanic Fifth Officer Harold Lowe, in charge of Lifeboat No. 14, was able to take this boat into tow from his own.

After boarding Carpathia, Harris composed herself enough to request that a message be sent to family and associates informing them she was safe and was still hopeful about the safety of Mr. Harris. When Carpathia arrived in New York on April 18, Harris was met by her father-in-law, brother, and the family doctor. Her first words to those who greeted her were, "I have come back alone." Harris remembered very little of what happened during the next two months. Her sister, Edna, spoke for her at a news interview; she attended a Masonic memorial service for her husband at the Hudson Theatre, but had no recollection of being there. She continued to hope that her husband's body would be recovered and identified; Harris' brother traveled to Halifax to try to locate his brother-in-law's body. His remains were never recovered, despite the promise of a substantial reward. Harris later sued the White Star Line for $1 million for the death of her husband; she received only a fraction of this amount. (Note: When the claims were settled, White Star limited a maximum claim to $50,000. The agreement was reached in 1915; there were no payments until 1916. White Star claimed it had limited liability and would be paying six times as much as it believed was due under such an agreement.)

Despite her troubles with the White Star Line, Harris came to admire the conduct of Fifth Officer Harold Lowe. She later gave an interview specifically to bring attention to Lowe's actions. Aboard Carpathia and again in New York City, she tried to offer him a monetary award which he turned down both times, saying merely that he did his duty. Harris instead sent a set of nautical instruments, including a sextant, a telescope, and binoculars, to an event in Lowe's hometown where he was being honored, each inscribed with the phrase "The real hero of the Titanic." In 1932, Harris would again note of Lowe in an article that he had stood out in her memory as "one of the finest men it has been my privilege to meet."

== Changes in fortune ==
Mr. Harris' will was filed in probate court with the bulk of the estate going to his wife. After his death, there was much speculation in the theater world as to whether his widow would sell her husband's company and theaters, or if she would try to manage them and produce plays herself. At first, Harris was unsure about what she wanted to do. After talking with her father-in-law and remembering that her husband once told her, "You are a better businessman than I am.", she decided to continue her husband's business with the assistance of William Harris Sr. Both were in accord that the business would be run as Mr. Harris did. The business became known as the Estate of Henry B. Harris with Harris being known professionally as Mrs. Henry B. Harris. The decision to carry on in her husband's stead made Renee Harris the first female theatrical manager and producer on Broadway. In reality, this was not technically correct, since Charlotte Baldwin (1778–1856) had managed a theatre in Broadway already in the 1820s.

Harris continued alone in this field until 1922 when Anne Nichols, a playwright, also began managing plays. Both Harris and Nichols were mentioned as being among the top woman directors of plays in 1922.

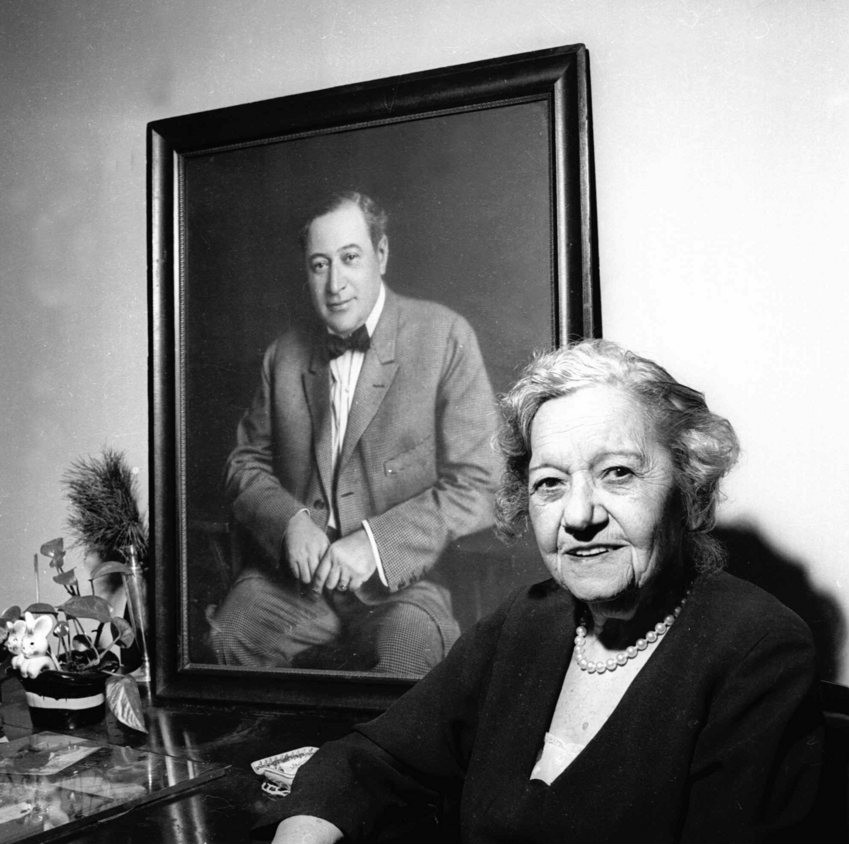
Harris in 1959 with portrait of Henry B. Harris. The portrait was all she was able to take from the Hudson Theatre.

When Mr. Harris' will was settled, no one was prepared for the news that his debts outweighed his assets. Harris' father-in-law took a look at the situation and advised his daughter-in-law to give up the company. She refused because it seemed to her that doing so would be an insult to Mr. Harris' name and memory. She threw herself into play production and sold various assets; Harris paid her husband's debts. After these bills were paid, Harris was able to live the lifestyle she had enjoyed before Titanic. She owned homes in New York, Maine and Florida and racehorses and was also able to travel regularly again. During this period, Harris married three times; each marriage ended in divorce. Her last marriage ended in 1927 with Harris describing her spouse as "nothing but a source of expense" to her. Harris summed this up by saying, "I have had four marriages, but only one husband."

Harris was on an around the world trip in 1929 when her business manager wired, asking her to come home. She had invested heavily in stocks that appeared to be safe, but they did not survive the market's 1929 crash. At the same time, there were no productions able to fill the theater; the Depression meant little to no money spent on entertainment. Harris was offered the chance for The Green Pastures at the Hudson Theatre and eagerly signed the production. When construction of the play's sets began, it was found that building a treadmill necessary for the production would damage the theater's foundation. Playwright Marc Connelly canceled the contract with the Hudson and moved the play to the Mansfield Theatre. (Note: The play ran for 640 performances at the Mansfield.)

Harris gradually sold off assets to stay afloat. She had an extensive collection of antiques; all were gone by 1931 to make ends meet. By 1932, she had lost the Hudson Theatre she and Mr. Harris had built. The bank instituted foreclosure proceedings for the theater's $500.000 mortgage. Harris had earlier been offered $1 million for the theater, but she refused to sell it. All she was able to take from the theater was a large portrait of her husband. After the theater was gone, Harris worked at a variety of jobs. She had a small interior decorating business at one point and by 1937, had a job through WPA. By 1940, Harris' home was a single room in an inexpensive New York hotel. During his lifetime, Mr. Harris was a generous supporter of The Actors Fund; the charity helped to support his widow in her later years.

== Theater work ==
Harris' first theater production was Damaged Goods, an English production of Eugène Brieux's 1901 play, Les Avariés. Presenting the play, which deals with prostitution and syphilis, was a daring move. Both Harris and her father-in-law knew that Mr. Harris had read the play and intended to present it after returning home from Europe. Actor and co-producer Richard Bennett had been turned down by many theater managers once the subject of the play was known. Many actors were also frightened off by the thought of not working again as a result of appearing in the play. The presentation was considered a great success.

The presentation of Bayard Veiller's play, The Fight created unexpected problems for Harris and her father-in-law. The play deals with ridding a small Colorado town of a brothel. At the same time it was being presented, the Shubert Theatre was presenting The Lure, which also dealt with the subject of prostitution and white slavery. New York's police commissioner decided both plays were "immoral", and wanted an injunction to shut them down and to have the plays' producers arrested. To bring the controversy regarding The Fight to an end, Veiller struck the play's second act.

Harris believed there were many performing and non-performing places for women in theater. She was also quick to recognize talented young actors and playwrights. Harris first saw Barbara Stanwyck (then Ruby Stevens) and her two friends Mae Clarke and Dorothy Shepherd when they were dancing in the chorus at a New York nightclub. Harris was casting for members of the chorus for the production of Willard Mack's The Noose. She thought there was something special about the trio, so she asked them to come to her office at the Hudson Theatre. Harris asked each of them to read a few lines, then hired them for speaking parts in the play with Stanwyck in the role of Dot. Stanwyck's role as Dot was enlarged when Harris suggested this character fall in love with the young man instead of the governor's daughter.

Harris had invested in Moss Hart's first effort at play writing, The Beloved Bandit. The play was tried out in Rochester, New York, but was a failure. It was taken on to Chicago, where it met the same fate as it had in Rochester; the production was closed after the first night and the planned Broadway production was canceled. Harris had seen something more in the young man than this failure. She told him in Rochester, "The way it went tonight doesn't bother me a bit. You know why? First, this is Rochester-and what the hell does Rochester know about anything except Kodaks?" Hart went on to a notable career as a playwright, director and screenwriter. He later said he likely would have given up without the encouragement of Harris. Hart's description of her was, "Rich, racy and of infinite good humor."

== Later years ==
When Walter Lord began writing A Night to Remember, he located and interviewed more than 60 persons who had survived the disaster. Harris was one of those interviewed by Lord; the two began a friendship that lasted until Harris' death in 1969. She had previously been invited to the premiere of a 1953 film about the sinking, Titanic, but shunned the publicity affairs of it. Despite an injured hip, Harris was able to take part in the events surrounding the 1958 film based on Lord's book, A Night to Remember, but was not able to watch the film.

Harris died September 2, 1969, at New York's Doctors Hospital; she was 93 years old. Many years prior to her death, she summed up her life by saying, "If I had my life to live over, I wouldn't change it. After all, I had 10 wonderful, happy, superb, unforgettable years with my first husband. He spoiled me for any other man in the world." She is interred in the Shrine of Memories mausoleum at Ferncliff Cemetery in Hartsdale, New York. Harris donated her personal papers to the Wisconsin Historical Society.

== Portrayals ==
- Natalie Benesch (1958) - A Night to Remember
- Lisa Hilboldt (1979) - SOS Titanic
