= Strongheart (film) =

1914 film directed by James Kirkwood Sr.

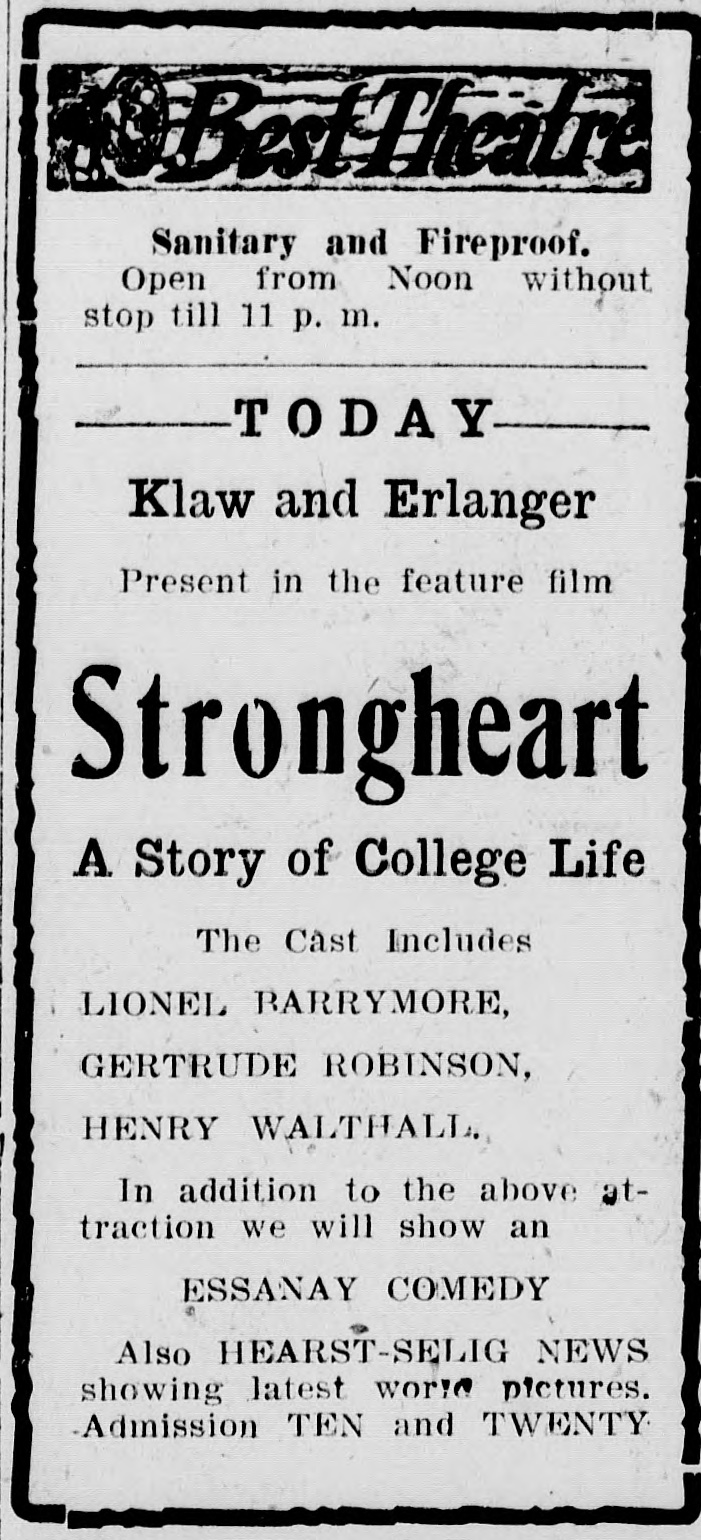
- Contemporary advertisement
- Directed by: James Kirkwood Sr.
- Written by: Frank E. Woods
- Based on: Strongheart by William C. deMille
- Produced by: Henry B. Harris; Klaw & Erlanger
- Starring: Henry B. Walthall; Lionel Barrymore; Blanche Sweet; Antonio Moreno
- Production company: American Mutoscope and Biograph Company
- Distributed by: General Film Company
- Release date: March 19, 1914
- Running time: 30 min
- Country: United States
- Languages: Silent; English intertitles

Strongheart is a 1914 American silent Western black and white film directed by James Kirkwood Sr., produced by Henry B. Harris, written by Frank E. Woods and starring Henry B. Walthall, Lionel Barrymore, Blanche Sweet and Antonio Moreno. The film was supervised by D.W. Griffith.

It is based on the four-act play of the same name by William C. deMille, produced by Henry B. Harris at the Hudson Theater on 30 January 1905 for 66 performances with Robert Edeson.

The melodrama Braveheart is a remake of Strongheart.

== Plot ==
According to a film magazine, "Frank Nelson and his sister Dorothy are on a hunting trip. Soangataha — "Strongheart," a Chiefs son, saves Frank from drowning. Frank and Dorothy are deeply grateful to him for his kindness. Strongheart is so impressed with Frank's tales of the East that he decides to return with them to acquire the wisdom of the white man for the benefit of his race. When Strongheart reaches his destination he gives Dorothy a string of beads and a knife to Frank as a parting gift. Later Strongheart is a star on the Columbia College eleven and a great favorite with the boys. They are all enthusiastic over their big Football game which they are training. Ralph Thorne is in love with Dorothy Nelson, who treats him with indifference. Dorothy favors Dick Livingston, her brother's chum, and Thorne, Insane with jealousy, plans to disgrace Dick by getting him intoxicated and persuading him to gamble. Dick yields to the temptation and loses heavily. Thorne makes him a proposition to loan him $3,000. Dick consents and bets the entire amount on Columbia, thereby hoping to get out of the debt. Thorne exchanges his list of signals for Dick's and sends them to the opposing team. Billy Saunders has sex with Molly, Dick Livingston's sister. As a proof of his love she asks him to give her something he has sworn never to part with. He gives her the Football signals (which are in Thorne's handwriting) and warns her of their importance.

Dick is very devoted to Dorothy, but she gives him no encouragement for she realizes that she has fallen in love with Strongheart and leads him to hope she cares for him by giving him a rose. The signals are received by the opposing team, who are too honorable to take advantage of the stolen information. Their manager, Farley, decides to take the matter up with Buckley, the manager of the Columbia team. Thorne suggests that perhaps you can tell who sent the signals by the handwriting. Strongheart recognizes Dick's handwriting and refuses to show the signals till after the game. In trying to shield Dick, Strongheart allows himself to be suspected of having sent the signals and is not allowed to play the closing half of the game. Under the promise of secrecy, Strongheart allows Billy to see the signals. Billy believing that Molly has double-crossed him. Dorothy and Molly, unaware of what has transpired, are astonished at not seeing Strongheart in the game. Strongheart is frantic with excitement when Columbia wins the second half. Mrs. Nelson gives a dance in honor of the winning team. Billy accuses Molly of sending the signals to the opposing team. She denies this and gives the signals she has to Strongheart. They are astonished to find them in Thorne's handwriting.

Thorne attempts to have sex with Dorothy, but she repulses him. He leaves her and meets Billy, who asks him to send a telegram — merely a scheme to compare his handwriting with the signals in Strongheart's possession. Strongheart is convinced that Dorothy cares for him, and asks her to be his wife. Dorothy tells him of her love for him and tells him to come the following day for her answer. Frank enters just as they are in a fond embrace. Strongheart tells Frank that he loves Dorothy and wants to marry her. Frank upbraids him for daring to love a white girl and orders him out of the house. The following day a banquet is given to the football team. Billy begs Molly to forgive him for ever having doubted her. She finally relents and when he asks her to marry him she consents. Dick treats Strongheart coldly until he learns that the signals sent to the opposing team were in his own handwriting. He is overcome and apologizes to Strongheart. The members of the team hold a meeting for the purpose of discovering the guilty man. Dick is unable to explain how his signals were sent. Strongheart is called next and he accuses Thorne of having sent Dick's list to the other team and produces Thorne's own ropy which Billy has given to Molly. Thorne realizes that he is caught and confesses his guilt. He leaves at once in disgrace. Strongheart cannot be urged to join the Boys' dinner, saying that he has been taught that he is not one of them. He prepares to leave for home and Dorothy tells him of her great love and that she is ready to go away with him. Black Eagle arrives with the news of the death of Strongheart's father. He tells Strongheart of the great need his people have for him and forces Strongheart to realize that Dorothy could not live the life of his people. Strongheart struggles between love and duty. Dorothy entreats him to take her with him. He begs her to leave him while he has the courage to do what is right and despite her pleadings he decides to follow the path of duty and return to his people. He kisses her a sad farewell and is led away by Black Eagle."

== Cast ==
- Antonio Moreno as Frank Nelson
- Blanche Sweet as Dorothy Nelson, Frank's Sister
- Henry B. Walthall as Soangataha / Strongheart
- Gertrude Robinson as Molly Livingston
- Tom McEvoy as Dick Livingston, Molly's Brother
- Lionel Barrymore as Billy Saunders
- Alan Hale Sr. as Ralph Thorne
- William J. Butler as Manager of the Opposing Team
- W.C. Robinson as Team Assistant
- James Kirkwood
- Jack Mulhall as In Stadium Crowd

== Production ==
The stadium scenes were filmed at Harvard Stadium in Cambridge, Massachusetts during a football game between Cornell and Harvard.
