= Henry B. Harris =

American theatre producer (1866–1912)

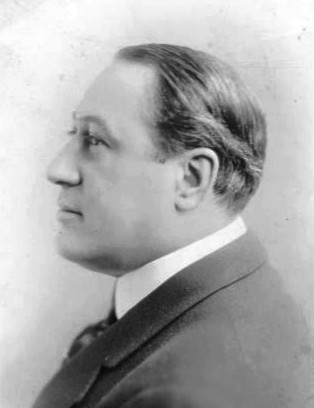
- Born: Henry Birkhardt Harris; December 1, 1866; St. Louis, Missouri, US
- Died: April 15, 1912 (aged 45); North Atlantic Ocean
- Occupation: theatrical producer
- Years active: 1901–1912
- Spouse(s): Renee Harris (married 1898–1912)
- Parent(s): William Harris, Sr. Rachel Freefield
- Relatives: William Harris Jr. (brother)

Henry Birkhardt Harris (December 1, 1866 – April 15, 1912) was a Broadway producer and theatre owner who died in the sinking of the RMS Titanic. His wife was the future producer Renee Harris, who survived the sinking and lived until 1969.

== Life ==
Harris was the son of William Harris Sr., a founder of the Theatrical Syndicate in the 1890s and Rachel Harris (née) Freefield. He had a younger brother, William Harris Jr. Harris was born in St. Louis in 1866 and was a young boy when the family moved to Boston. He began his career selling song books in the theater lobby as a young man in St. Louis. When the family moved to Boston, young Harris began selling song books in the lobby of the Howard Athenaeum. He married Irene "Renee" Wallach, a legal secretary from Washington, D.C., with an interest in the theater on October 22, 1899. (Note: Irene Wallach Harris (known as Renee) took over her husband's business after his death. She was initially assisted by her father-in-law and her brother-in law, William, although she was head of the estate.)

Harris worked for his father in the theatrical business in Boston for a number of years before starting out on his own producing plays in 1901. He managed such stars as Amelia Bingham and Robert Edeson. In 1906, Harris became the owner of the Hackett Theatre on 42nd Street. The theater was later renamed the Harris Theatre, to honor William Harris Sr. He leased and managed the Hudson Theatre in New York and in 1911 built the Folies Bergère Theatre. The Folies Bergère was an attempt to emulate the success of its Parisian namesake. By September 1911 it had failed swiftly and heavily: Harris lost a reported $100,000 on the venture.

By April 1912 he was in London, arranging future performances of Maggie Pepper by Charles Klein with his star artiste Rose Stahl and the original American cast from the Harris Theatre. (Note: Charles Klein also died in a well-known maritime disaster, the sinking of Lusitania in 1915.) The play was made into a 1919 film of the same name. Harris also acquired an option on the US rights to The Miracle, the world's first full-color narrative feature film that would later show at the Royal Opera House.

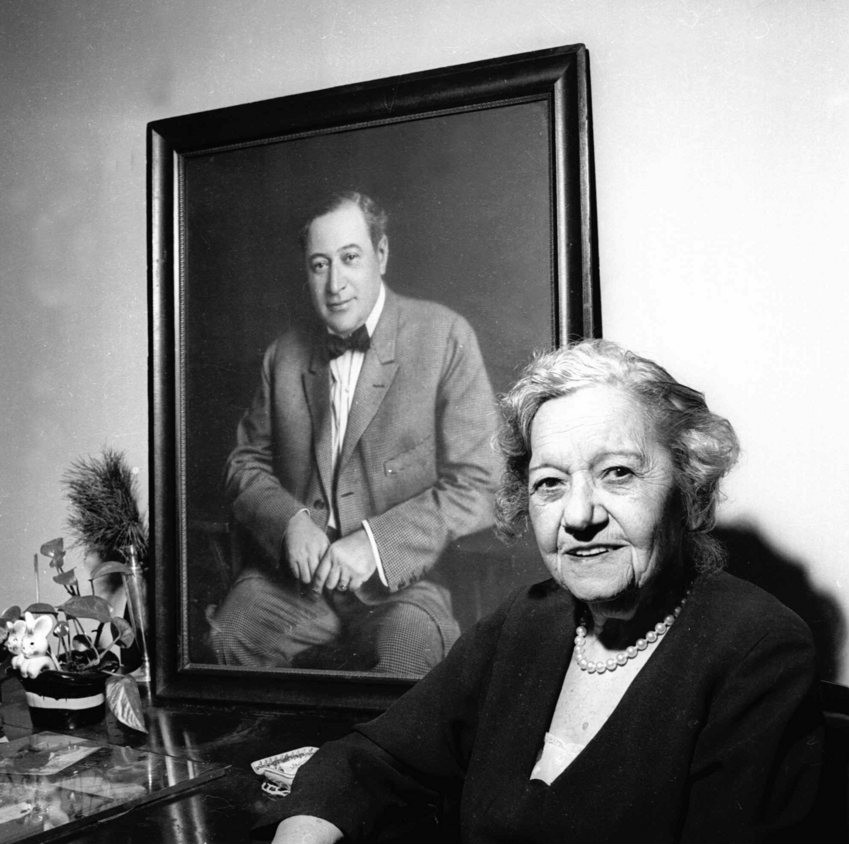
Renee Harris with a portrait of her husband in 1959

Harris was one of the nearly 1,500 who died in Titanic's sinking on April 15, 1912.

Although she had broken her right arm near the elbow in a fall on Titanic's aft grand staircase earlier in the day, Renee Harris had refused to be parted from her husband. Mrs. Harris was rescued by the ship RMS Carpathia. She cabled the Hudson Theatre from the ship, saying that her husband was not among those on board, but hoped he had been saved by another rescue vessel. A story was circulated that Harris had been rescued by another ship and had wired his New York office to that effect, but this proved to be untrue. His body was lost at sea. If it was recovered and brought to Halifax by one of the cable ships sent out to look for bodies, it was never identified as such.

== Portrayals ==
- Robert Henderson (1958) - A Night to Remember
- Ed Bishop (1979) - SOS Titanic

== Selected productions ==
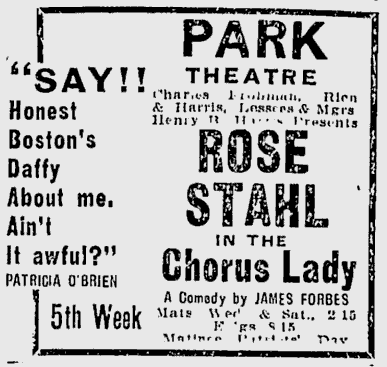
Advertisement for Rose Stahl in The Chorus Lady at the Park Theatre, Boston in 1909

- Soldiers of Fortune (1901)
- Strongheart (1905)
- The Lion and the Mouse (1905)
- The Chorus Lady (1906) (*made star of Rose Stahl)
- The Struggle Everlasting (1907)
- The Traveling Salesman (1908)
- Pierre of the Plains (1908)
- The Third Degree (1909) (*made star of Helen Ware)
- Such a Little Queen (1909) (*made star of Elsie Ferguson)
- A Skylark (1910) (with May de Sousa)
- The Arab (1911)
- The Fight (1912); *Estate of Henry B.Harris
- Strongheart (1914)
