= William Harris (theatrical producer) =

American theatrical producer

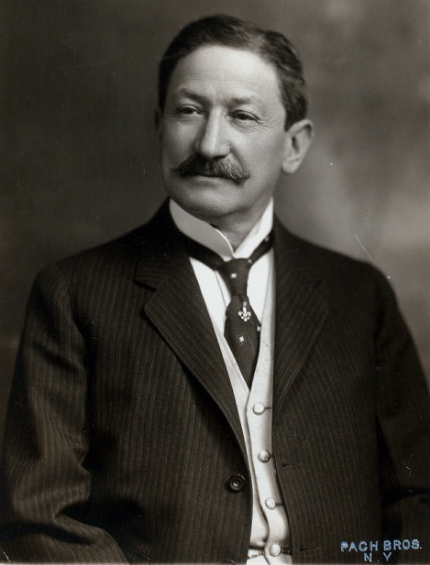
William Harris

William Harris (c. 1844 – November 25, 1916) was a prominent American theatrical producer who owned or held a large interest in some 50 theatres in New York City, Boston and Chicago. He was considered the dean of theatrical managers. His children included Henry B. Harris and William Harris Jr., both theatrical producers.

== Biography ==
Born in Prussia, William Harris was brought to the United States at age six by his father, who opened a clothing store in Bridgeport, Connecticut. Harris attended school for just three months while his family lived in Cleveland; then he worked in cigar manufacturing when the family settled in St. Louis, Missouri. He began his theatre career as a minstrel and blackface comedian in vaudeville, with John Bowman (1866–1873), and with William Carroll (1873–1879).

Around 1880, Harris leased the Howard Athenaeum in Boston, Massachusetts. His success in running the theatre led to a partnership two years later with one of its owners, Isaac B. Rich. Harris later produced plays with Klaw and Erlanger and Charles Frohman, often as a silent partner, and made stars of Andrew Mack, Elsie Ferguson, Rose Stahl, Louis Mann and Clara Lipman. Harris was called the Peter Pan of the theatre business, for his good humor and gift as a storyteller.

In April 1913 it was reported that Harris had married young stage actress Florence Quayle. Harris contradicted rumors that they had wed a month before, stating that they had been married for three years. By this time, Harris was considered the dean of American theatrical managers, and one of the most popular people in the profession. Although he had been working toward retirement, he resumed the leadership of his business in 1912 after his elder son, Henry B. Harris, died in the sinking of the RMS Titanic.

At the time of his death in 1916, Harris either owned outright or held a significant interest in some 50 playhouses in the United States. These included the Hudson Theatre, Fulton Theatre, Knickerbocker Theatre, Lyceum Theatre, Liberty Theatre, Empire Theatre and New York Theatre in New York City; The Boston Theatre, Hollis Street Theatre, Colonial Theatre and Tremont Theatre in Boston; and the Colonial Theatre, Illinois Theatre, Blackstone Theatre and Powers Theatre in Chicago.

Harris died unexpectedly from a heart ailment on November 25, 1916, at his home in Bayside, Long Island, at age 71. The first play he produced jointly with his surviving son, William Harris Jr., had opened on Broadway five days before. In his will, Harris gave keepsakes to friends—including a watch and fob to Abraham Erlanger, a set of pearl studs to Charles Frohman, and a set of pearl sleeve buttons to Marc Klaw. He bequeathed his sizable estate to his son, his two daughters, and a granddaughter.
