= William Harris Jr. =

Broadway theatrical producer (1884-1946)

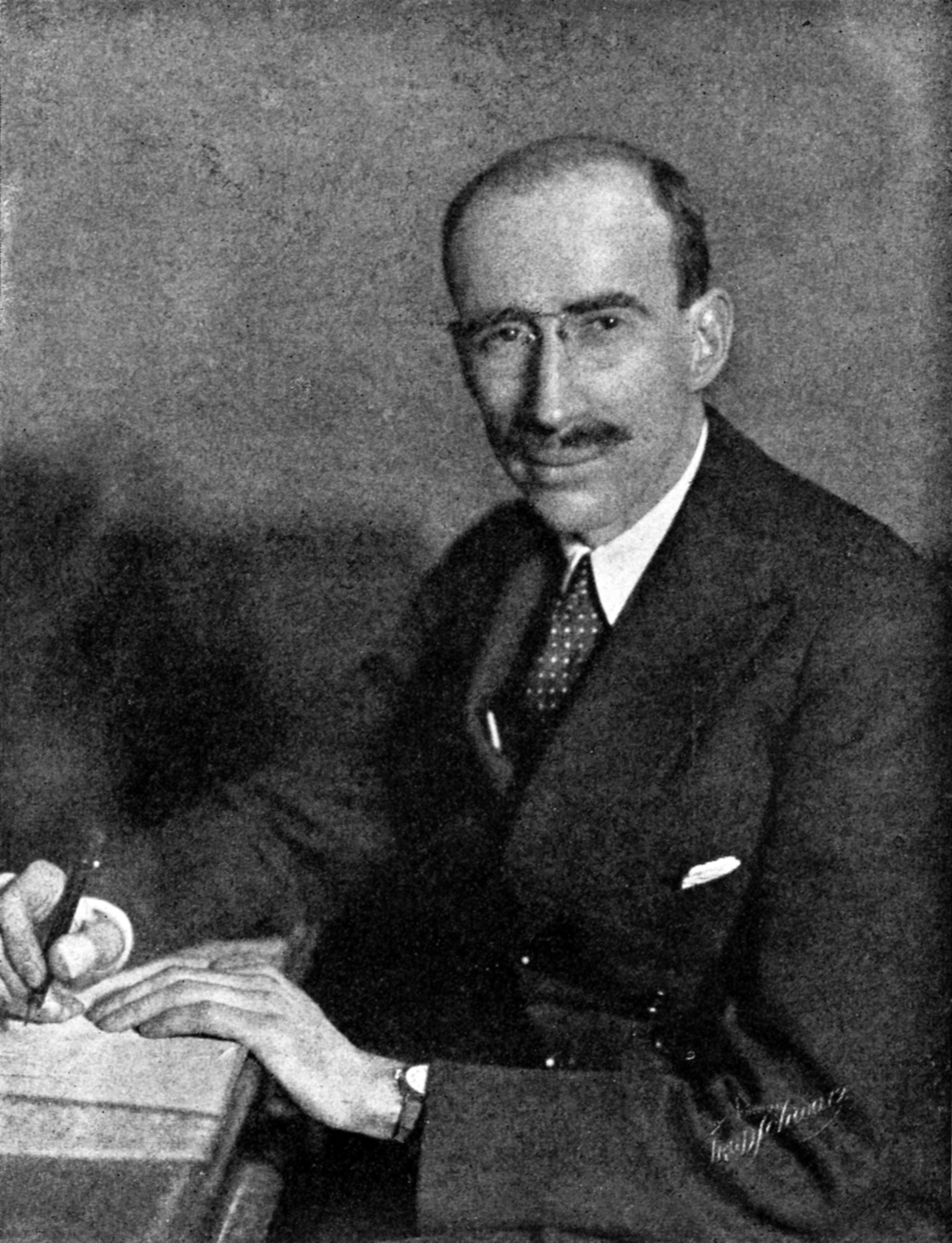
- William Harris Jr. in 1919
- Born: 1884
- Died: 1946 (aged 61–62)
- Occupation: Broadway producer

William Harris Jr. (1884–1946) was a well-known Broadway theatrical producer.

Plays he produced included Abraham Lincoln, East is West, Twin Beds (1914), Outward Bound, and The Greeks Had a Word for It.

He was the son of producer William Harris (Sr.), and younger brother of producer Henry B. Harris. Harris, who studied at Columbia University, was considerably younger than his brother. He was traveling and continuing his studies while his older brother became established in his theater work. The younger Harris was returning from Paris when he received word that his brother was one of those who died on the RMS Titanic.

Harris assisted his sister-in-law in the management of his brother's business affairs, becoming a producer himself through this work.
