= Hudson Theatre =

Broadway theater in Manhattan, New York

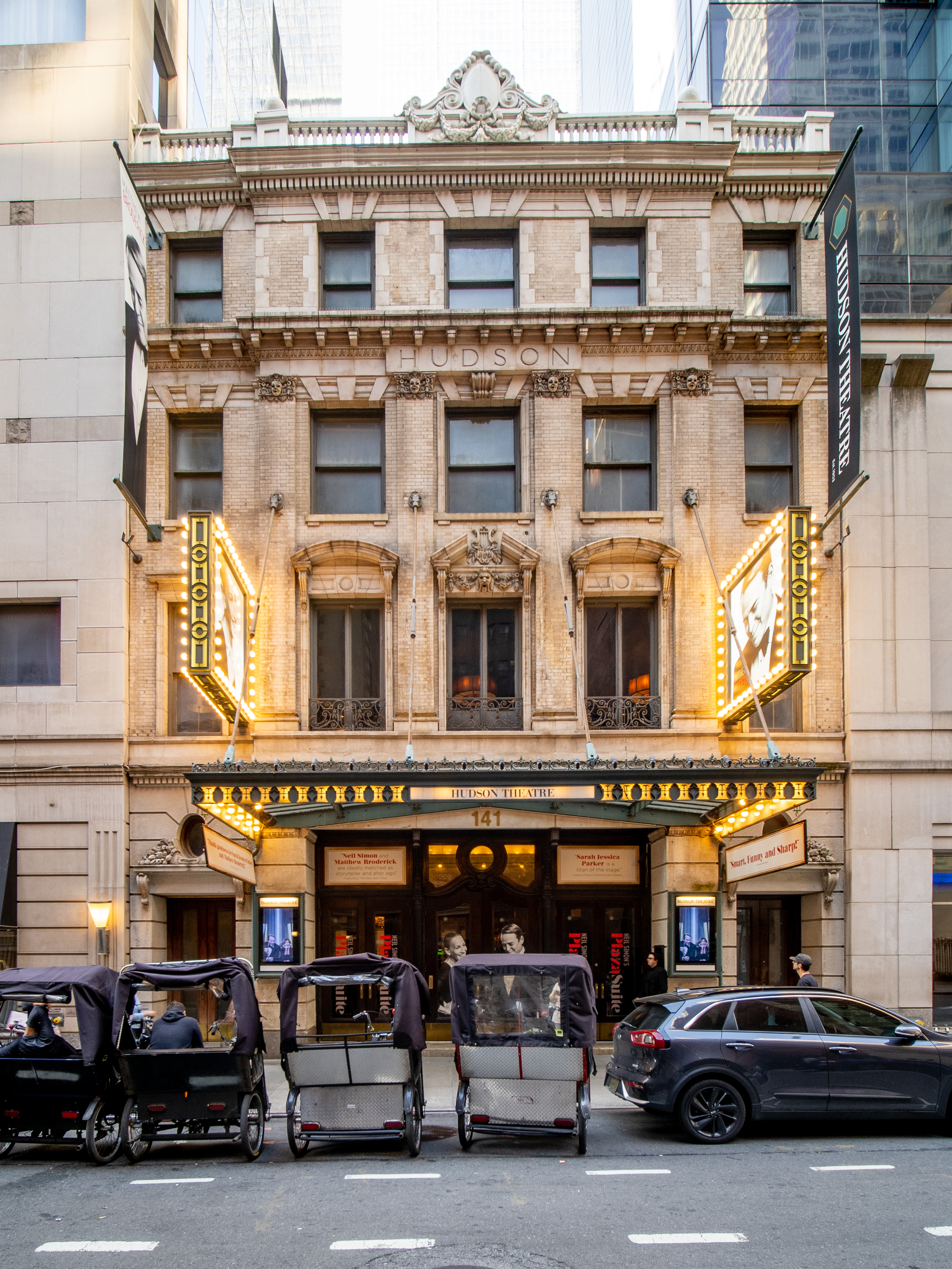
- 44th Street facade as seen in 2022
- Interactive map of Hudson Theatre
- Address: 141 West 44th Street; Manhattan, New York; United States
- Coordinates: 40°45′25″N 73°59′05″W
- Owner: Millennium & Copthorne Hotels
- Operator: ATG Entertainment
- Capacity: 970
- Type: Broadway
- Production: Other Desert Cities

Construction
- Opened: October 3, 1903 (123 years ago)
- Reopened: February 8, 2017
- Years active: 1903–1934, 1937–1949, 1960–1968, 2017–present
- Architects: J.B. McElfatrick & Son; Israels & Harder

Website
- us.atgtickets.com/venues/hudson-theatre-broadway/whats-on/

U.S. National Register of Historic Places
- Designated: November 15, 2016
- Reference no.: 16000780
- Designated entity: Theater

New York State Register of Historic Places
- Designated: September 23, 2016
- Reference no.: 06101.019056
- Designated entity: Theater

New York City Landmark
- Designated: November 17, 1987
- Reference no.: 1340
- Designated entity: Facade

New York City Landmark
- Designated: November 17, 1987
- Reference no.: 1341
- Designated entity: Lobbies and auditorium interior

The Hudson Theatre is a Broadway theater at 139–141 West 44th Street, between Seventh Avenue and Sixth Avenue, in the Theater District of Midtown Manhattan in New York City, New York, U.S. One of the oldest surviving Broadway venues, the Hudson was built from 1902 to 1903. The exterior was designed by J. B. McElfatrick & Son, while Israels & Harder oversaw the completion of the interior. The theater has 970 seats across three levels. Both its exterior and interior are New York City designated landmarks, and the theater is on the National Register of Historic Places.

The Hudson Theatre's massing consists of two primary rectangular sections, both of which are clad in tan brick with Flemish bond. The main entrance is through a four-story wing on 44th Street, while the auditorium is housed in the rear along 45th Street. The first story of the 44th Street wing contains an entrance vestibule, ticket lobby, and main lobby, while the other stories contained offices. The auditorium consists of a ground-level orchestra and two overhanging balconies, with boxes at the first balcony level. The lobbies and auditorium are ornately decorated in the Beaux-Arts Classical style, while the backstage facilities are more simply decorated. The theater is flanked by the two wings of the Millennium Times Square New York hotel, of which it is part.

The Hudson was originally operated by Henry B. Harris, who died in the 1912 sinking of the Titanic. His widow, Renee Harris, continued to operate the Hudson until the Great Depression. It then served as a network radio studio for CBS from 1934 to 1937 and as an NBC television studio from 1949 to 1960. The Hudson operated intermittently as a Broadway theater until the 1960s and subsequently served as an adult film theater, a movie theater, and the Savoy nightclub. The Millennium Times Square New York hotel was built around the theater during the late 1980s, and the Hudson Theatre was converted into the hotel's event space. The Hudson Theatre reopened as a Broadway theater in 2017 and is operated by ATG Entertainment; the building is owned by Millennium & Copthorne Hotels.

== Site ==
The Hudson Theatre is at 139–141 West 44th Street, between Seventh Avenue and Sixth Avenue near Times Square, in the Theater District of Midtown Manhattan in New York City, New York, U.S. It is between the two wings of the Millennium Times Square New York hotel, of which the Hudson Theatre is technically part. The primary elevation of the facade is along 44th Street; a rear elevation extends north to 45th Street. The theater's land lot originally had the addresses 139 West 44th Street and 136–144 West 45th Street. It had a frontage of 42.6 feet (13.0 m) on 44th Street and 83.4 feet (25.4 m) on 45th Street, with a depth of 200 feet (61 m) between the two streets. The modern hotel's lot includes the theater. The lot covers 16,820 square feet (1,563 m^{2}), with a frontage of 117.42 feet (35.79 m) on 44th Street and a depth of 200 feet (61 m).

On the same block, 1530 Broadway is to the west and the Hotel Gerard and Belasco Theatre are to the east. Other nearby buildings include the High School of Performing Arts to the northeast, the Lyceum Theatre and 1540 Broadway to the north, One Astor Plaza to the west, 1500 Broadway to the southwest, and the Lambs Club Building and the Town Hall to the south. Generally, the area includes residential or commercial buildings much larger than the Hudson. Just before the theater's development at the beginning of the 20th century, the portion of the site on 45th Street had belonged to Paul J. Crovat, while the 44th Street portion was owned by the estate of Joseph Deutsch.

== Design ==
The Hudson Theatre was designed in the Beaux-Arts style and constructed from 1902 to 1903. The architectural firm of J. B. McElfatrick & Son was the original architect, but the firm of Israels & Harder oversaw the completion of the design. It is not known why the plans were changed. McElfatrick was a prominent theater architect, but Charles Henry Israels and Julius F. Harder are not known to have designed any other theaters. Plans indicate that McElfatrick designed the facade while Israels and Harder designed the interior.

=== Facade ===
The Hudson Theatre's massing consists of two primary rectangular sections: a narrow entrance to the south on 44th Street, as well as the auditorium on 45th Street. Both the 44th and 45th Street elevations are clad in tan brick with Flemish bond. The four-story 44th Street elevation is the more ornate street frontage, being the primary entrance. The five vertical bays are symmetrically arranged, with the three middle bays forming a projecting pavilion, and they are split into three horizontal sections of one, two, and one stories. The facade was deliberately designed to be slightly shorter than its width, referencing the largely residential character of the neighborhood at the time of the theater's opening. The five-story 45th Street elevation is comparatively plain in design and has little decoration.

==== 44th Street ====
The first-story facade consists of rusticated blocks of limestone, with a water table made of granite. The outermost bays contain wood-and-glass double doors, which are recessed deeply from the facade. Above each of the outer doorways are brackets supporting a cornice, which is topped by a bull's-eye window with cornucopias on either side. The three inner bays contain the theater's main entrance, which is also recessed. Within the main entrance opening are three sets of wood-and-glass double doors, above which is a wooden transom bar and glass window lights above. The central set of doors has a scroll frame, which is topped by a circular window flanked by oval window lights. A marquee hangs above the inner bays and is supported by tie rods from the third story of the facade. This marquee dates from 1990 but is similar in design to the original marquee. A belt course with small dentils runs above the first floor.

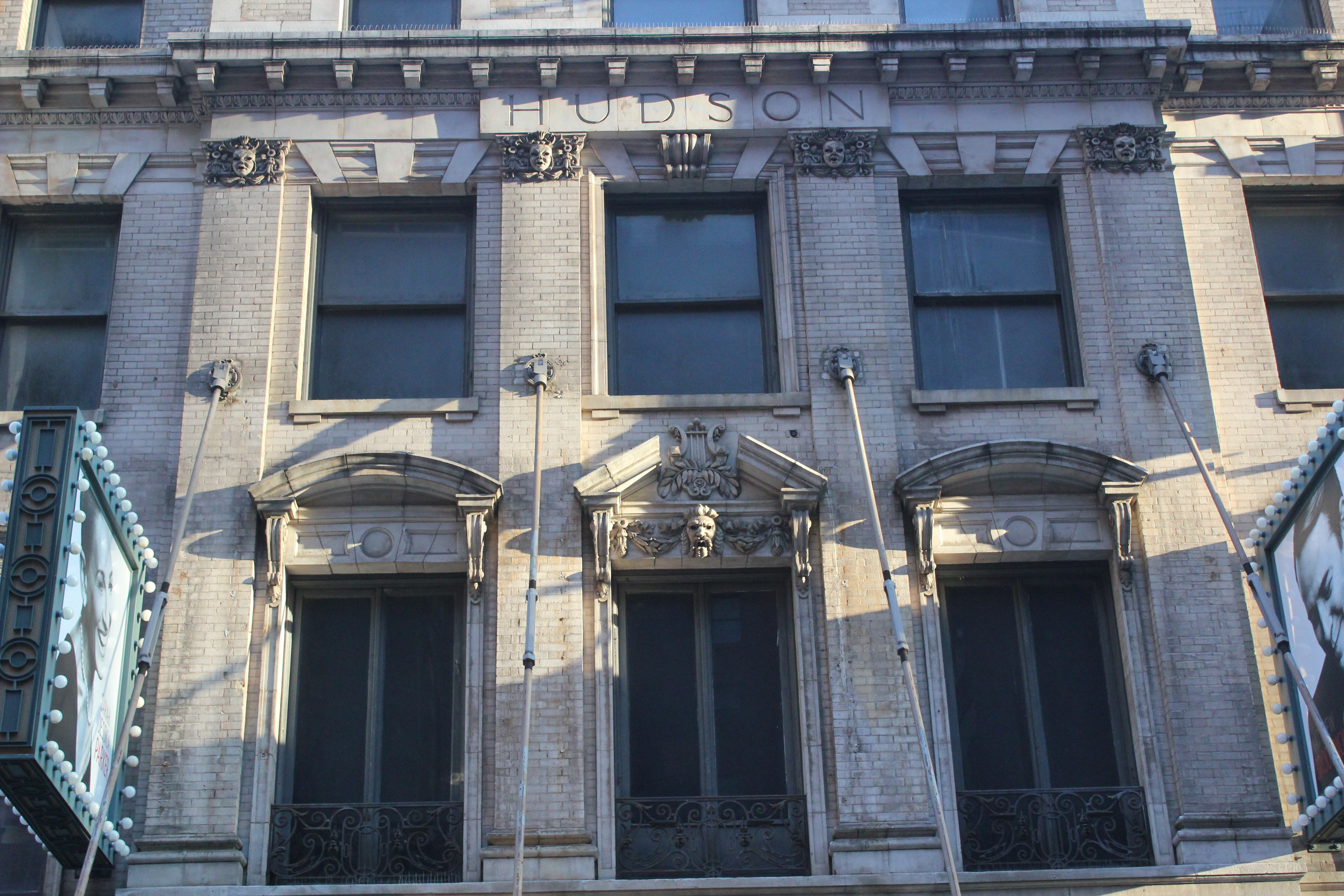
Second- and third-story detail

At the second and third stories, four double-height pilasters flank the inner bays, with stylized theatrical-mask motifs at the pilasters' capitals. The second-story inner bays contain French doors, which open onto wrought-iron balustrades containing motifs of lyres. Above the center bay is a broken pediment shaped as a segmental arch; the center of the pediment contains a male head (probably depicting the god Apollo) and a lyre. The next-from-center bays are topped by plain lintels, as well as console brackets supporting segmental-arched pediments. The outermost bays have double-hung sash windows with limestone surrounds and lintels.

The third-story windows all have limestone surrounds and double-hung sash windows. The third-story windows are smaller than the second-story windows, though the inner windows are wider than the outer ones. Beneath each third-story window sill are corbels. Above the windows is a limestone string course, containing three splayed keys above each window. The center window is topped by a console bracket and a tablet with the word hudson. The third story is topped by a leaf-and-tongue molding (interrupted by the hudson tablet) and a cornice with modillions.

The fourth-story windows are sash windows, similar to those on the third story, except that the three middle windows are flanked by quoins. Each fourth-story opening is topped by an entablature, containing three splayed keys above each window. The top of the fourth story contains a denticulated stone cornice and a parapet with a metal balustrade. Above the parapet, the outer bays contain piers, while the center bay has an oval shield with consoles and swags. The cornice wrapped around to both the west and east elevations, but only the east cornice return is visible.

==== 45th Street ====
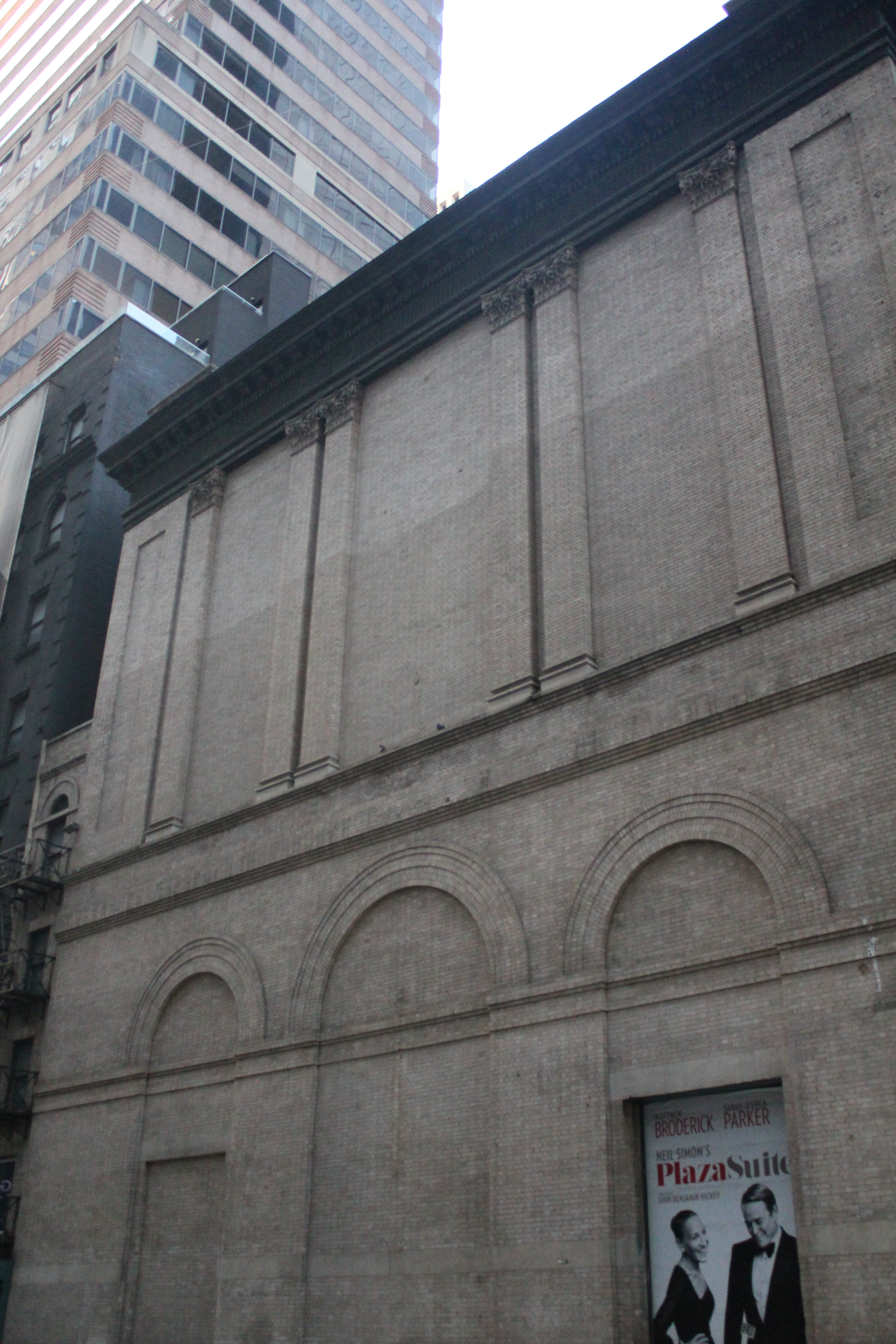
45th Street elevation of the facade

The north elevation is plain in design and is made of tan brick in Flemish bond. The stage house, comprising most of the 45th Street elevation, is flanked by one-bay-wide, five-story-tall galleries. The base of the stage house contains three blind arches, with recessed openings in the two outer arches. The western opening has a stage door. The imposts below the tops of the arches are connected to each other, creating a belt course above the second story. The upper stories of the stage house are also divided into three bays by single and double pilasters. The capitals of these pilasters are topped by Corinthian capitals with mask decorations. Recessed brick panels flank the outer bays. Above the stage house is a metal cornice with a reeded frieze, modillions, and medallions.

On either side of the stage house are the galleries. At the first story, there are metal emergency exit doors. The upper stories have double-hung windows with cast stone lintels. A wrought-iron fire escape runs in front of both galleries. The fifth-story windows contain cast-stone lintels, above which are arches and limestone cornices.

=== Interior ===
The Hudson Theatre has multiple interior levels. On 44th Street, the first story contains an entrance, ticket lobby, and main lobby. The second story (once the Dress Circle) was partitioned into offices after the original Broadway theater closed, while the third and fourth stories were divided into apartments. On 45th Street is the stage house, comprising the three-level auditorium, the stage, and backstage facilities. The lobbies and auditorium are ornately decorated in the Beaux-Arts Classical style, while the backstage facilities in the basement, rear, and sides of the theater have simple decorations. The three lobby spaces collectively measure 30 feet (9.1 m) wide and 100 feet (30 m) long, wider than any other lobby in New York City when the theater opened in 1903. The lobbies and auditorium contained several hundred concealed lamps, which could be dimmed and which comprised a diffused lighting system.

==== Lobbies ====
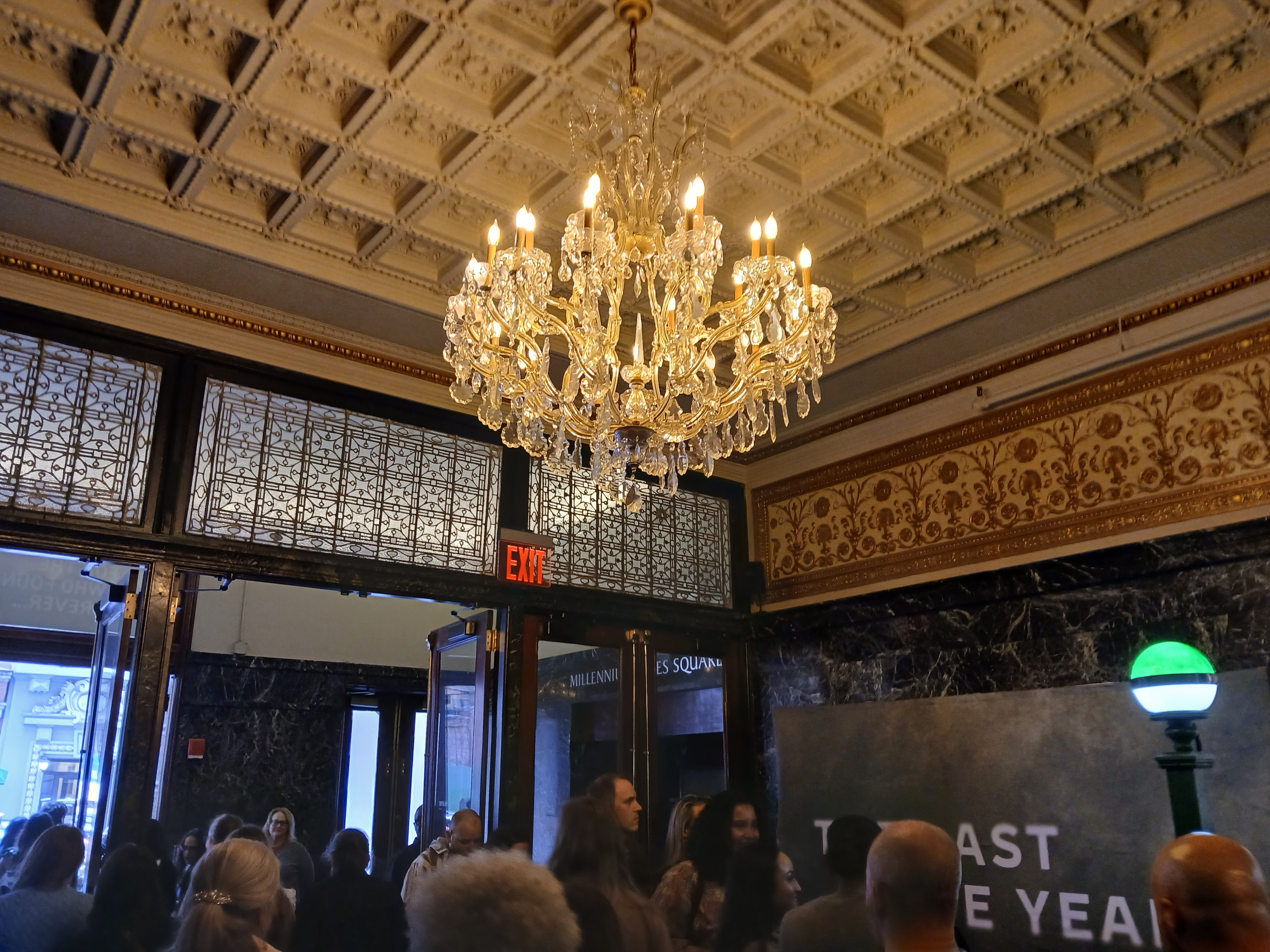
The ticket lobby, looking toward 44th Street; the chandelier hangs from the coved ceiling

===== Entrance vestibule =====
The rectangular entrance vestibule from 44th Street measures 36 feet (11 m) wide by 16 feet (4.9 m) deep. It has green marble paneling on the lowest two-thirds of the room's height. The walls are 12 feet (3.7 m) high and were originally topped by a green frieze; there was also a domed ceiling with electric lights. The west and east walls of the vestibule contain doorways, which were added in 1989 and connect with the hotel wings on either side. The main section of the vestibule has a staircase to the second story, while the eastern section has double doors leading to the third and fourth stories.

===== Ticket lobby =====
The ticket lobby is north of the entrance vestibule. It is approached from the vestibule by four sets of double wood-and-glass doors, which contain thresholds of white marble. The ticket lobby has a hand-woven carpet patterned with hexagonal shapes. The walls contain antique dark green marble with gold veining; they are topped by a shallow cornice, entablature, and neoclassical plaster frieze. The east wall has a box office with two ticket windows, as well as a staircase to the second balcony level of the auditorium. The ticket windows have bronze frames and are flanked by caryatids, which support entablatures above them.

The ticket lobby has a coved plaster ceiling with 264 coffers. The coffers are separated by bands and originally contained mounts for incandescent light bulbs. The light bulbs were removed and replaced with chandeliers at some point after the theater opened. A 1903 news article compared the ticket lobby's ceiling and plaster decorations to the Roman Baths of Titus.

===== Inner lobby =====
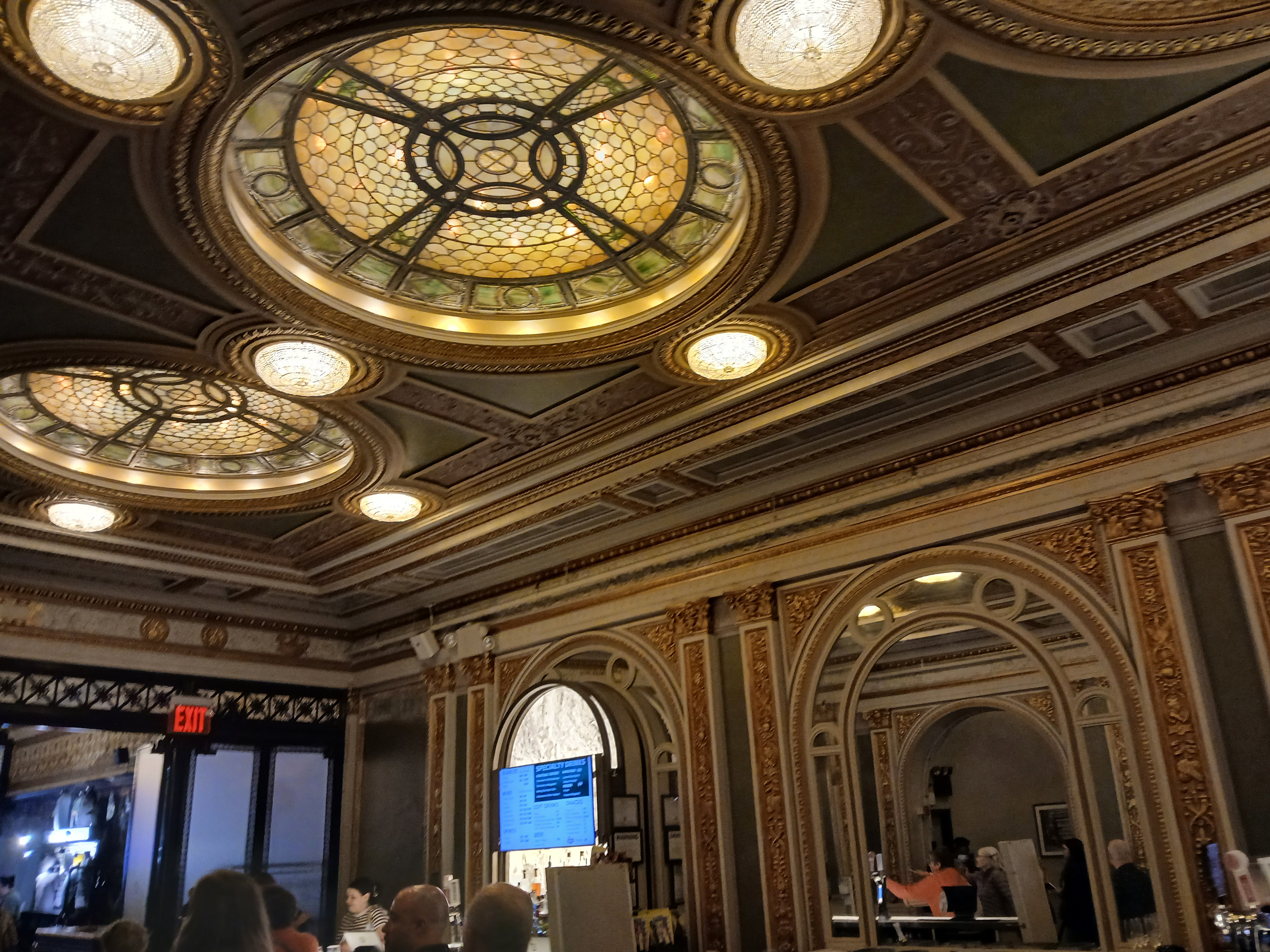
The inner lobby, looking toward 44th Street

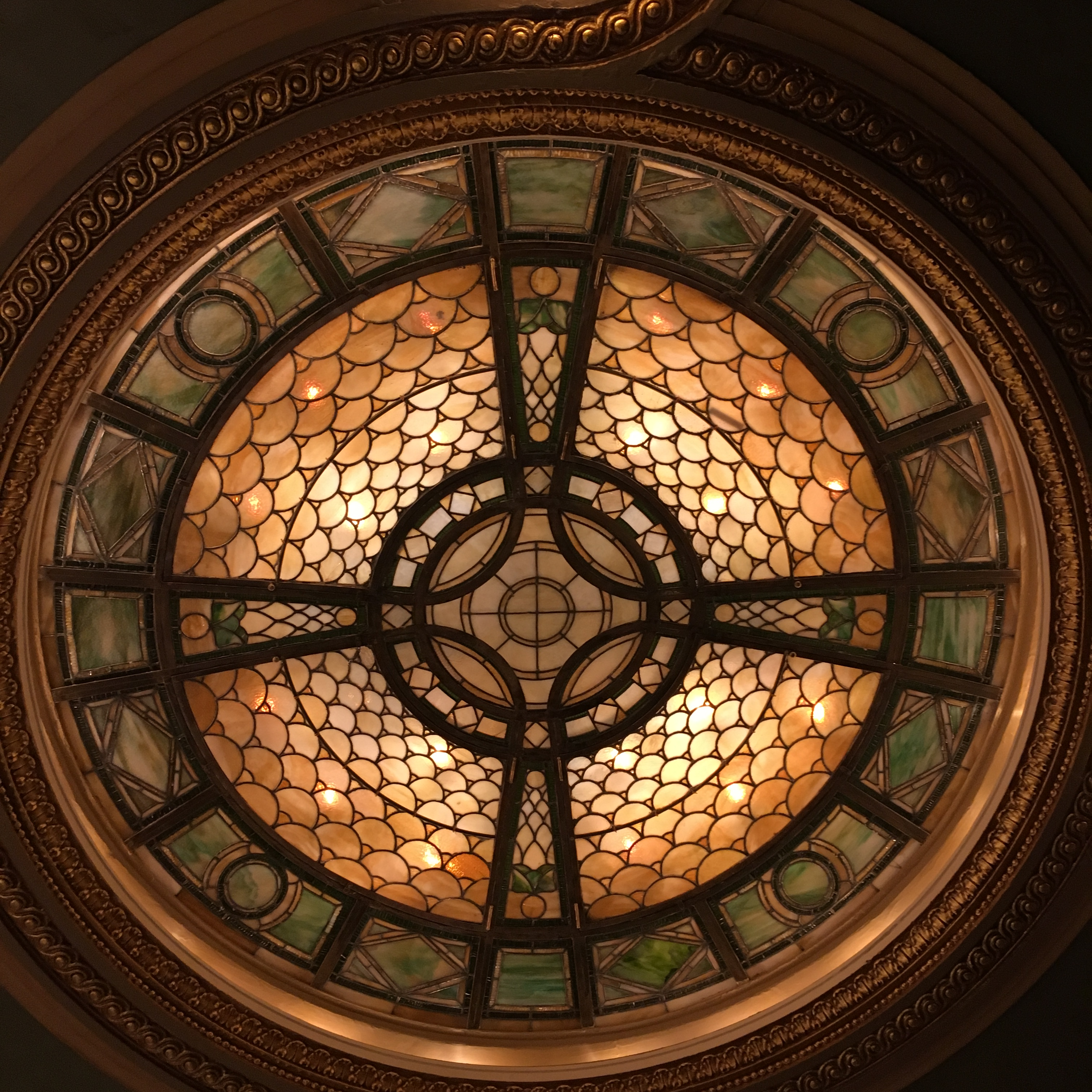
Detail of one of the inner lobby's Tiffany glass domes

Four pairs of bronze-and-glass doors lead from the ticket lobby northward to the inner lobby, also referred to as the foyer. The walls contain plasterwork decorations, including vertical pilasters, which support an entablature. The pilasters were placed on wooden bases and are variously described as being Corinthian or Ionic in style. The pilasters were originally colored ivory, orange, and green. They flank six arches, three each on the east and west walls, which contain foliate spandrels. Five arches contain mirrors, while the rightmost arch on the east wall contains a staircase to the first balcony level. The center arch on the west wall has a fireplace with a carved marble mantelpiece. The New York Times compared the mirrored walls to the Hall of Mirrors at the Palace of Versailles.

The north wall has a red curtain separating the foyer from the auditorium. Originally, this curtain was green and covered with gold trimming. Wide, ornamented plaster bands divide the ceiling into three sections, each of which has a Tiffany stained-glass dome. The domes contain gold, green, pink, and turquoise glass pieces, which date from their original installation. The center dome has a chandelier, and ten shallow crystal lamps surround the domes. The ceiling's edges have coffers with three-part stained-glass panels.

==== Auditorium ====
The auditorium has an orchestra level, boxes, two balconies, promenades on the three seating levels, and a large stage behind the proscenium arch. The auditorium's width is slightly greater than its depth, and the auditorium is designed with plaster decorations in high relief. The balcony levels are connected by stairs on either side and by fire stairs outside the auditorium. The auditorium was equipped with 28 emergency exits at its opening, more than in most contemporary venues at the time of its opening. The floor had "mushrooms" for air intake and outflow. Ventilation and heating could both be adjusted to accommodate outside conditions, and a sprinkler system was included in the original design. While these mechanical features have since become standard building-design elements, they were not common at the time of the Hudson Theatre's construction. There were originally 12 restroom stalls in the theater, which were expanded to 27 when the theater reopened in 2017.

===== Seating areas =====
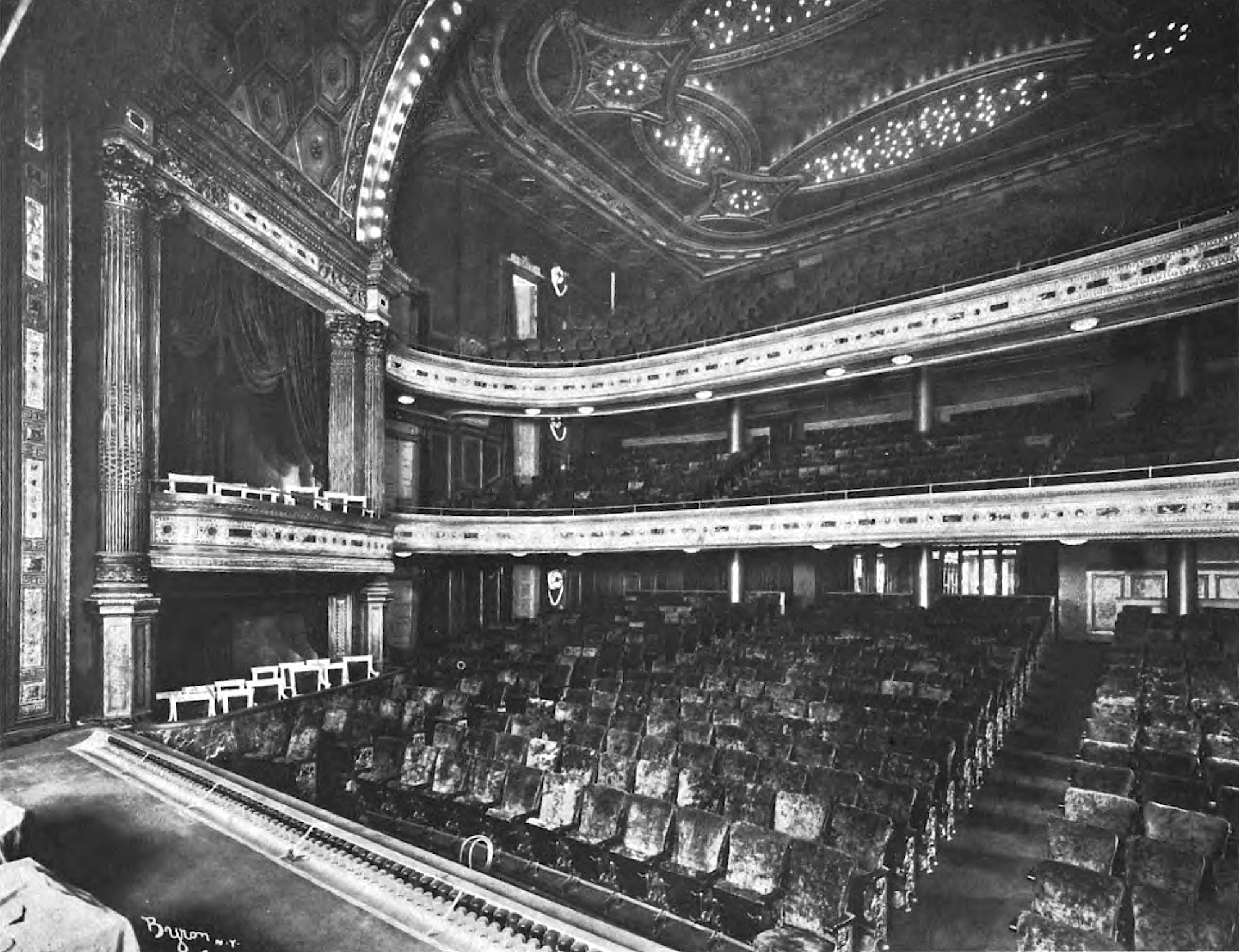
Seating in the auditorium as seen from the stage area. A first-balcony box is visible at left.

The Hudson Theatre was built with a capacity of 1,076 seats. The modern auditorium has 970 seats. Each seat is 23 inches (580 mm) wide, larger than typical Broadway seats, which average 17 inches (430 mm) wide. The seats contain gold-colored cushions with wooden backs and were manufactured by Kirwin & Simpson.

The foyer leads directly to a promenade that curves along the rear of the orchestra. The promenade's rear wall is paneled, while its ceiling contains bands and moldings that divide it into multiple sections. Three tall columns separate the promenade from the orchestra seating. The promenade formerly linked to a women's lounge, with large mirrors, east of the foyer. A marble-and-bronze staircase leads up from the west end of the orchestra promenade to the balconies. A men's lounge existed under the western staircase; it was subsequently converted into restrooms. Similar promenades exist on either balcony level, separated from the seats in front by half-height partitions. An elevator leads to the Dress Circle level, with steps down to the first balcony, but there is no elevator access to the second balcony.

The balcony levels have paneled pilasters on their walls, ornamental moldings on their fronts, and foliate bands on their undersides. In front of the balconies are yellow and gold moldings with Tiffany mosaic tiles. Unlike other Broadway theaters of the 1900s, the balconies are largely cantilevered rather than being supported on columns. According to the New York City Landmarks Preservation Commission (LPC), the use of cantilevered balconies strongly suggested that Israels & Harder was responsible for the interior design, since McElfatrick & Son used support columns even after cantilevered balconies were the norm. At the rear of the first balcony, columns with Corinthian capitals support the second balcony.

The orchestra has yellow side-walls with paneled pilasters. Near the front of the auditorium are two curved boxes at the first balcony level, one on either side of the auditorium. These boxes are flanked by paired fluted columns and pilasters in the Corinthian style. These columns, in turn, are topped by an entablature containing a frieze with foliate ornament, a cornice with dentils, and cresting. Each frieze has a panel with Tiffany tiles, which were reported in contemporary media as being similar to decorations in the Golden House of Nero. After the Hudson Theatre stopped operating as a Broadway theater, the boxes were turned into kitchen space.

===== Other design features =====
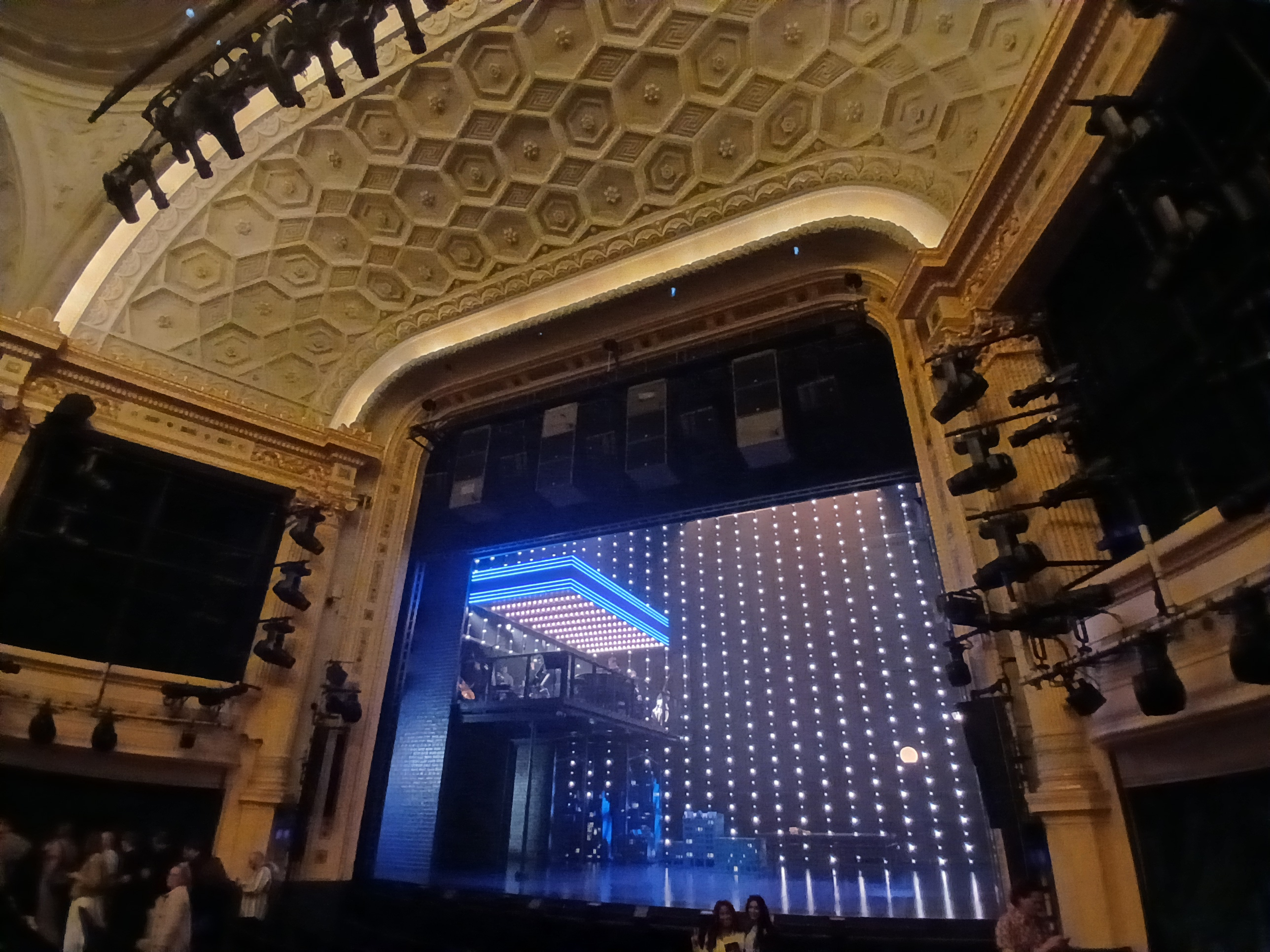
View of the proscenium arch and boxes from the orchestra

Next to the boxes is the proscenium arch, which consists of a wide, paneled band with a Greek key pattern. The key motifs surrounded light sockets, which have mostly been removed. The proscenium band also contains Tiffany mosaic tiles in green, yellow, and orange colors, as well as mother-of-pearl tiles. A laurel leaf molding surrounds the proscenium band. The stage area extends behind the proscenium arch to the northern wall of the stage house.

The orchestra boxes' columns support a sounding board, which curves onto the ceiling above the proscenium arch. Foliate bands and moldings surround the sounding board, form a cove. The sounding board is divided into hexagonal panels with light sockets, though few light bulbs remain. Behind the sounding board, the walls of the second balcony level curve to form the ceiling. There are wide plaster bands, containing moldings and octagonal panels; the moldings divide the ceiling into groined panels with neoclassical foliate decoration. The rear of the ceiling contains plasterwork with light sockets, as well as glazed light bulbs. According to one restoration architect, the pattern of the ceiling inspired a hexagonal motif for the restoration of the theater.

==== Other facilities ====
The basement lies under the entire site and protrudes below 45th Street. Five staircases and one elevator connect the basement to the ground story, while two doors lead to the Millennium Times Square hotel's wings. The doorways from the basement to the hotel were built during the 1990s. After the Hudson reopened as a Broadway theater in 2017, the basement has contained back-of-house facilities, restrooms, and bar space. Before that, it was used as a staff space for the hotel. The spaces had dropped and exposed ceilings, concrete masonry unit blocks, gypsum board walls, and floor finishes from the late 20th century.

The second story on the 44th Street wing was once the Hudson Theatre Dress Circle. It was partitioned into offices after the theater originally closed. It is connected to the rest of the theater only by a single staircase from the first floor. The second story has offices for the hotel, which are furnished with gypsum board walls, dropped ceilings, and carpeted floors. The east wall has a stair to the hotel. When the Hudson Theatre reopened in 2017, a VIP lounge was installed on the second story, connecting to the rear of the story. Part of the dress circle was demolished to make way for restroom stalls.

The third and fourth stories on 44th Street were refitted with two residential apartments, one on each story, after the theater had closed in the late 20th century. These apartments fell into disrepair but retained many original decorative elements as of 2016.

== History ==
=== Original Broadway run ===
Times Square became the epicenter for large-scale theater productions between 1900 and the Great Depression. Manhattan's theater district had begun to shift from Union Square and Madison Square during the first decade of the 20th century. The Hudson, Lyceum, and New Amsterdam, which all opened in 1903, were among the first theaters to make this shift. From 1901 to 1920, forty-three theaters were built around Broadway in Midtown Manhattan, including the Hudson Theatre. The theater was originally operated by producer Henry B. Harris, who had become well known in the theatrical community by the 1900s. The site, at 44th and 45th Street, was owned by financier George Gustav Heye.

==== Development and opening ====
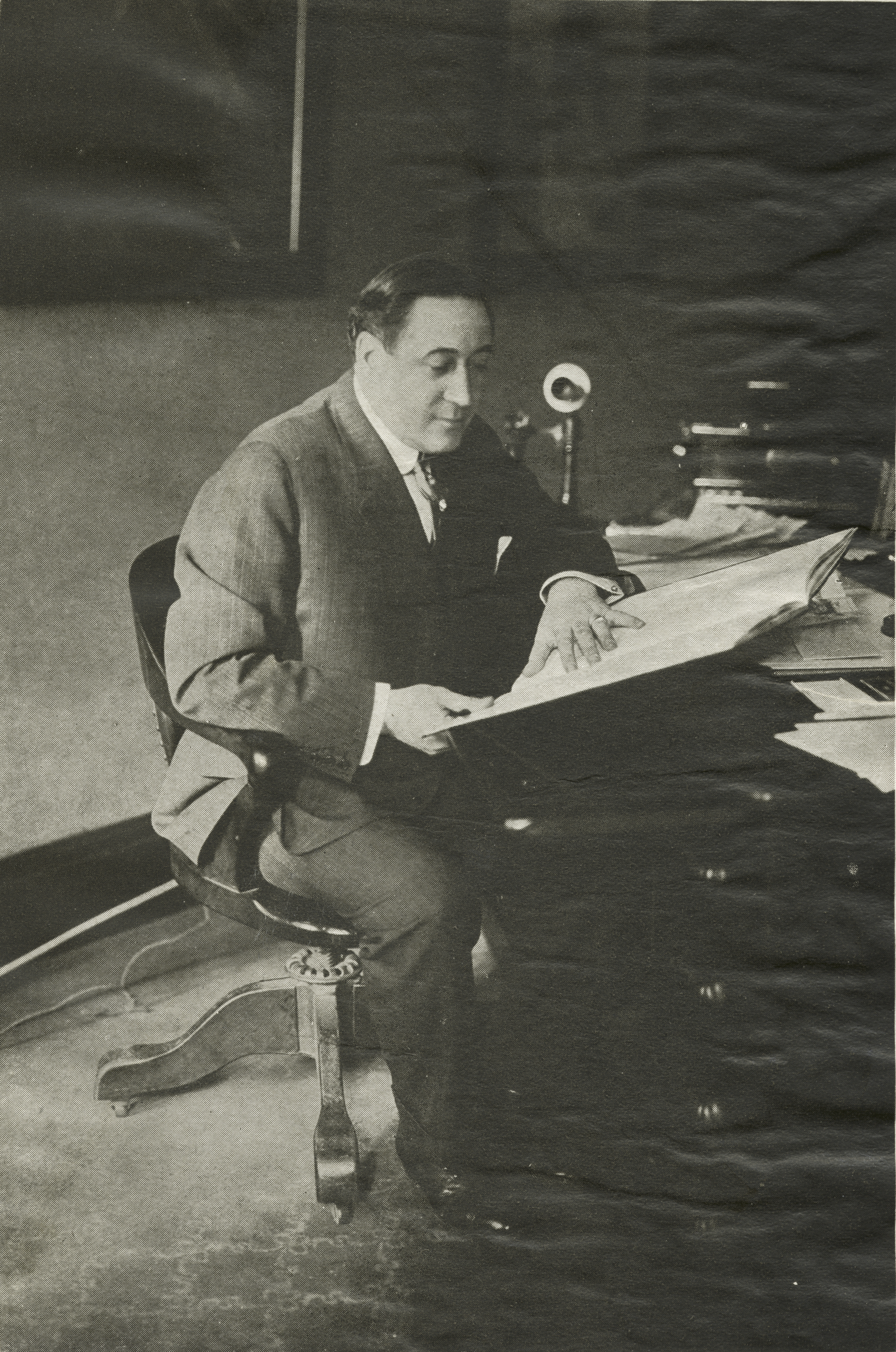
Harris at his office in the theater

In January 1902, Harris formed the Henry B. Harris Company to lease the site from Heye. That March, Heye filed plans with the New York City Department of Buildings (DOB) to develop a theater and six-story office structure on the site. J. B. McElfatrick was listed as the architect of record, though the permit only concerned structural elements and fire escapes. Work on the theater began on April 2, 1902, with the Ranald H. MacDonald Construction Company as general contractor. The Pennsylvania Electric Equipment Company was hired to construct a power plant for the theater. That August, Charles Frohman was hired to select productions for the theater during the following five years. The original plans had called for a ten-story office building to accompany the theater, but it was never built. By January 1903, Israels & Harder had submitted revised plans for the theater. Architectural and theatrical publications continued to refer to McElfatrick as the architect until early 1904.

Actors Robert Edeson and Alice Fischer formally christened the theater as the Hudson Theatre at a ceremony on March 30, 1903. The Hudson opened on October 19, 1903, with Ethel Barrymore starring in Cousin Kate. Generally, the theater was positively reviewed by both architectural and theatrical critics. At the opening, the Times wrote: "No richer and more tasteful theater is to be found short of the splendid Hofburg Theater in Vienna". Theatre magazine described the Hudson as being "more than modest externally, yet boasts an auditorium which for beauty of proportions chasteness of coloring, and good taste of equipment, is unsurpassed by any theatre in America". Architectural Record wrote that the decorative scheme "errs on the side of understatement", given the grandeur of the interior.

From its inception, the Hudson Theatre was intended as a venue for "drawing-room comedies". Such comedies included The Marriage of Kitty, which in November 1903 became the second production to be hosted at the Hudson. The following year, the Hudson hosted Sunday, where Barrymore reportedly first said "That's all there is, there isn't any more", later a popular quip. Man and Superman opened at the Hudson in 1905. This was the first time that its playwright, George Bernard Shaw, allowed one of his plays to be shown in a different manner than what he originally intended. Barrymore returned in 1908 for the production of Lady Frederick. The same year, Henry Harris bought the Hudson Theatre from Heye for $700,000.

==== Renee Harris operation ====
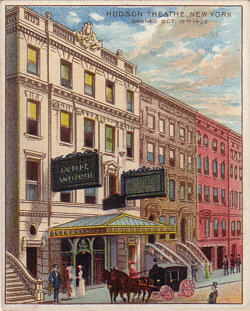
Hudson Theatre on a 1910s trading card

Henry Harris died on the RMS Titanic when it sank in 1912. All of his theaters were closed for one night in his memory, and his memorial service was hosted at the Hudson. Harris's wife Renee survived the Titanic with minor injuries and took over the Hudson's operation, in doing so becoming one of the first women to be a Broadway producer. Early on, Renee Harris was named as the "estate of Henry B. Harris" in production credits, as with Lady Windermere's Fan, which premiered in 1914.

Some of Renee Harris's productions had at least 300 performances, including Friendly Enemies (1918), Clarence (1919), and So This Is London (1922). (Note: Friendly Enemies had 440 performances; Clarence had 300; and So This Is London had 357.) George M. Cohan presented several productions at the Hudson, including Song and Dance Man (1924), American Born (1925), and Whispering Friends (1928). Howard Schnebbe leased the Hudson Theatre in May 1928 after Renee Harris announced her intention to take a break from theatrical management. Later that year, a Brooklyn Daily Eagle article said eight of the theater's original employees were still on the payroll, including Schnebbe and his brother Alan. The Hudson's performances during the late 1920s also included Black musicals such as Hot Chocolates (1929) and Messin' Around (1929).

During the late 1920s (possibly in 1929 (Note: News sources from 1932 mentioned that Renee Harris had rejected an offer three years prior.)), a developer offered Renee Harris $1.2 million so the theater's site could be redeveloped with an office building, but she had refused. The Hudson began to lose money in the early 1930s when the theatrical industry was heavily impacted by the Great Depression. The losses continued even though Henry Harris's brother William Harris Jr. worked actively with Howard Schnebbe to manage the theater. In November 1931, the Emigrant Savings Bank moved to foreclose on the theater's mortgage, saying Renee Harris owed $569,000. A foreclosure auction, originally scheduled for that December, was delayed by one month. Emigrant acquired the Hudson for $100,000 in January 1932. The theater continued to host performances during this time, including The Show-off in 1932. A Brooklyn Daily Eagle article in 1933 said that the Hudson was "perhaps the most active theater in town", with many shows in the auditorium and booking offices in the 44th Street wing.

=== Post-Harris era ===
==== 1930s and 1940s ====
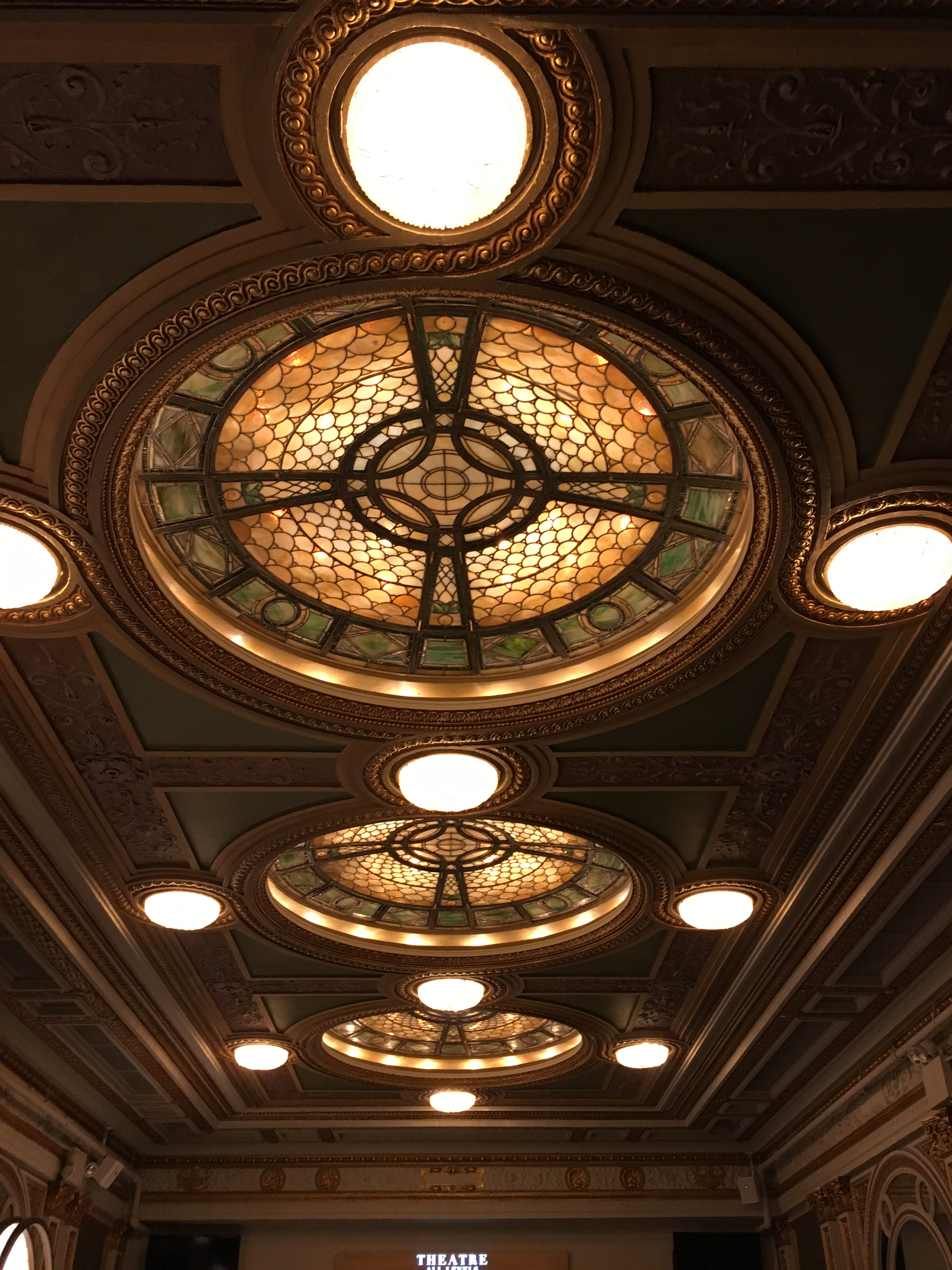
View down the inner lobby

CBS announced in January 1934 that it had leased the Hudson Theatre and would use the stage as a studio for radio broadcasts. The move followed an unsuccessful attempt to take over the unused rooftop theater at the New Amsterdam Theatre. The studio was dedicated on February 3, 1934, with free admission to the broadcasts. As part of the renovation, a commercial booth and an announcer's booth replaced the box seating on the first floor. The Hudson was known as CBS Radio Playhouse Number 1 during this time. The CBS studio was relatively short-lived, only operating until 1937.

In January 1937, Sam H. Grisman took over the theater. The Hudson reopened as a Broadway venue the next month with a production of An Enemy of the People. Among the other productions at the revived Hudson were The Amazing Dr. Clitterhouse (1938) and Lew Leslie's Blackbirds of 1939. The Emigrant Savings Bank owned the revived theater until 1939, when the Shubert Organization took over. Before Shubert took over the Hudson Theatre, it was closed for over six months. From 1941 to 1944, the Hudson hosted Arsenic and Old Lace, which set a record with 1,444 performances. The producers of Arsenic and Old Lace, Howard Lindsay and Russel Crouse, bought the Hudson for $300,000 in January 1944. Their subsequent production, State of the Union, had 765 performances at the Hudson. Another long-running production was Detective Story, which had 581 performances from 1949 to 1950.

==== 1950s and 1960s ====
NBC purchased the Hudson Theatre in June 1950 for $595,000, and the theater became a television studio for NBC. Detective Story, which then was being produced at the Hudson, had to be moved to the Broadhurst because NBC wanted to move into the Hudson immediately. At that time, several Broadway theaters had been converted to TV studios due to a lack of studio space in New York City. The shows at the studio included Broadway Open House, "The Kate Smith Hour" and The Tonight Show. Steve Allen and Jack Paar, the first and second hosts of The Tonight Show, both hosted at the Hudson. Allen conducted his "Man on the Street" interviews outside the theater's stage entrances on 45th Street. In November 1958, NBC offered the Hudson for sale at $855,000, in part because many of the network's productions had since moved to Hollywood. After unsuccessfully trying to find a buyer for several months, NBC decided to renovate the theater back into a Broadway venue on its own.

The production Toys in the Attic was announced for the Hudson Theatre in late 1959. Toys in the Attic opened the following year, becoming one of the few successful Broadway productions during the theater's third run. NBC agreed in September 1961 to sell the theater for $1.1 million to Samuel Lehrer, who wished to replace it with a parking garage. NBC said it could not find any theatrical company interested in the site. Theatrical groups heavily opposed the plans, and Robert Breen, a producer who had lived in the 44th Street wing since 1942, refused to move out. The theater's uncertain status meant that productions could run only a few weeks at a time, so the theater stood empty for long periods. In May 1962, NBC agreed to sell the theater for $1.25 million to Sommer Brothers Construction, which planned an office and garage building on the site. After Strange Interlude played the theater in 1963, the theater was vacant for two years.

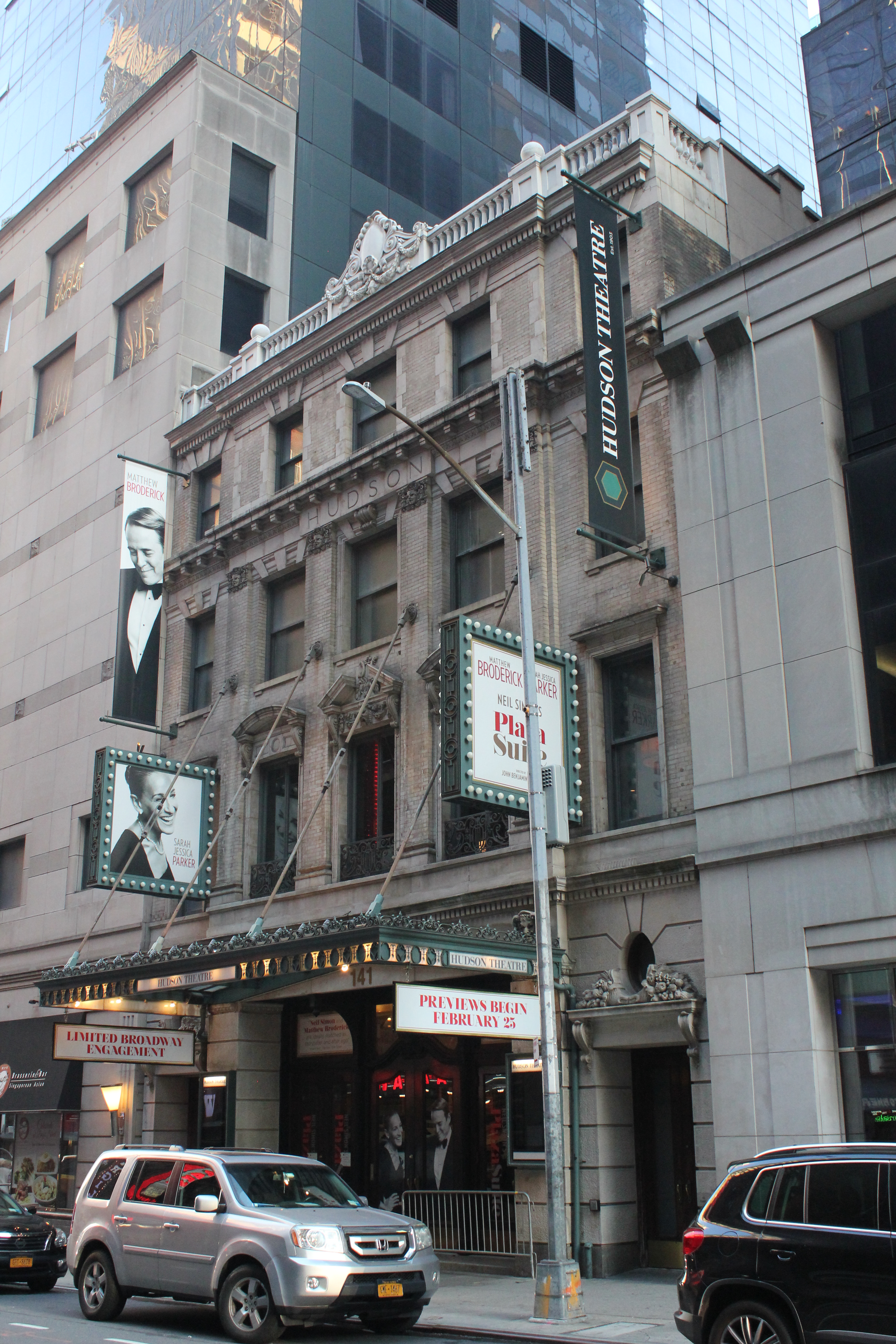
Viewed from the east

The Sommer Brothers never redeveloped the Hudson Theatre's site because they could not acquire enough land on 45th Street for their office development. As a result, in 1965, they placed the theater for sale. It was then acquired by Abraham Hirschfeld. The same year, the Hudson hosted the satirical burlesque production This Was Burlesque starring Ann Corio. This show had 125 performances before touring the country. Leroy C. Griffith announced in 1966 that he would operate the Hudson Theatre for burlesque productions. Later that year, Seymour Durst moved to acquire several lots on the city block, including the Hudson Theatre, though he denied he bought the theater itself. Variety magazine reported in February 1967 that Durst had not only bought the Hudson Theatre but also was looking to lease it to an adult film exhibitor. Among the films shown there were Andy Warhol's I, a Man and Bike Boy. The theater also hosted the Broadway production How to Be a Jewish Mother during December 1967 and January 1968.

=== Post-Broadway ===
==== Adult films and cinema ====
The United States Steel Corporation and Carnegie Pension Fund had acquired the site in 1968 and leased it to Durst. The theater was renamed the Avon-Hudson in 1968, becoming a pornographic theater. It was the flagship venue of the Avon porn-theater chain. In December 1972, the theater's license was temporarily suspended due to "disorderly conduct" and "conspiracy to show obscene films", but the theater continued to operate anyway. By 1975, U.S. Steel was attempting to remove pornographic shows from the theater. Avon was forced to shut down its pornographic productions at the Hudson that April, relocating them to the nearby Henry Miller Theatre. Avon unsuccessfully sued U.S. Steel over the eviction and then allegedly ripped out seats before leaving. The theater was part of the "Bond site", owned by William J. Dwyer & Company, which itself represented U.S. Steel.

In late 1975, Dwyer reopened the Hudson Theatre as a cinema following a renovation. The theater screened The Hiding Place for several weeks and was then empty again, but Dwyer wished specifically to avoid showing porn features, choosing instead to air budget productions. After failing to attract enough visitors with a $1 ticket price, the Hudson shifted to airing Spanish-language films, then to running features such as Jaws. Irwin Meyer and Stephen R. Friedman then considered converting the Hudson back into a Broadway venue. In April 1981, following a $1.5 million renovation by Ron Delsener, the Hudson Theatre reopened as the Savoy dinner club. The club hosted performances by such personalities as Peter Allen, Miles Davis, and James Taylor. After hosting rock and similar genres, the Savoy closed for several months, reopening in July 1982.

==== Conversion to hotel conference center ====
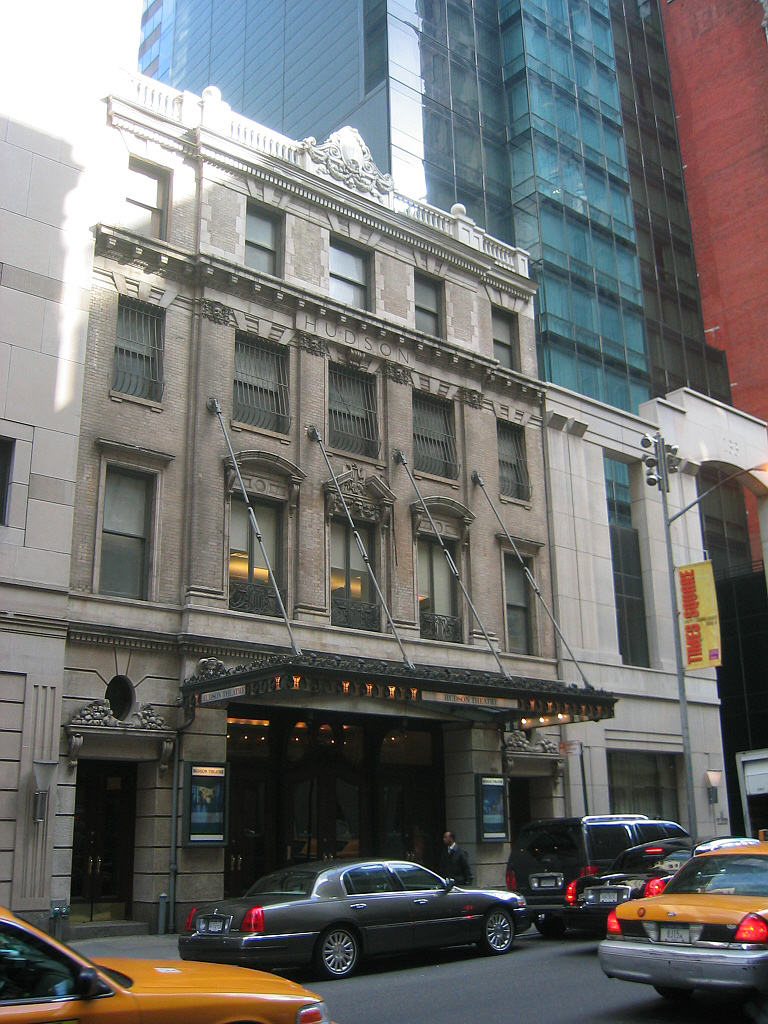
Seen in 2003, after it was incorporated into the Millennium Times Square New York

The theater was closed by 1983, and Harry Macklowe acquired the Hudson Theatre the next May. He acquired several other properties on the block in the mid-1980s. The New York City Landmarks Preservation Commission (LPC) designated both the facade and the interior as landmarks on November 17, 1987. This was part of the LPC's wide-ranging effort in 1987 to grant landmark status to Broadway theaters. The New York City Board of Estimate ratified the designations in March 1988.

Macklowe developed the surrounding lots into the Hotel Macklowe (later the Millennium Times Square New York) in 1988. The Hudson was incorporated into the hotel as a conference center and auditorium space. The modifications included preserving the landmarked decorations, including the Tiffany glass, marble stairs, and woodwork, as well as refurbishing the seating. A new deck, dressing rooms, and stage rigging were added, and a projectionists' booth and a Dolby sound system were installed. During the hotel's construction, models of guestrooms and conference rooms were built on the Hudson's stage.

The Hudson underwent a $7 million renovation to convert it into a conference center for corporate meetings, fashion shows, and product launches. Among the events in the conference center was the World Chess Championship 1990, when Soviet grandmasters Garry Kasparov and Anatoly Karpov competed in New York City's first World Chess Championship since 1907. The championship took place while the renovation was still ongoing. The Hotel Macklowe's general manager said he was planning to show six to twelve theatrical productions each year in the theater. The hotel's management wished to attract fashion shows to the conference center as well, despite the relatively small size of the Hudson's stage. In addition to independent corporate events, weddings could be hosted in the theater. Starting in November 2004, Jablonski Berkowitz Conservation restored the theater; the $1.2 million project lasted a year, with work occurring between events and seminars. The project included restoring the theater's Tiffany glass decorations.

=== Broadway revival ===
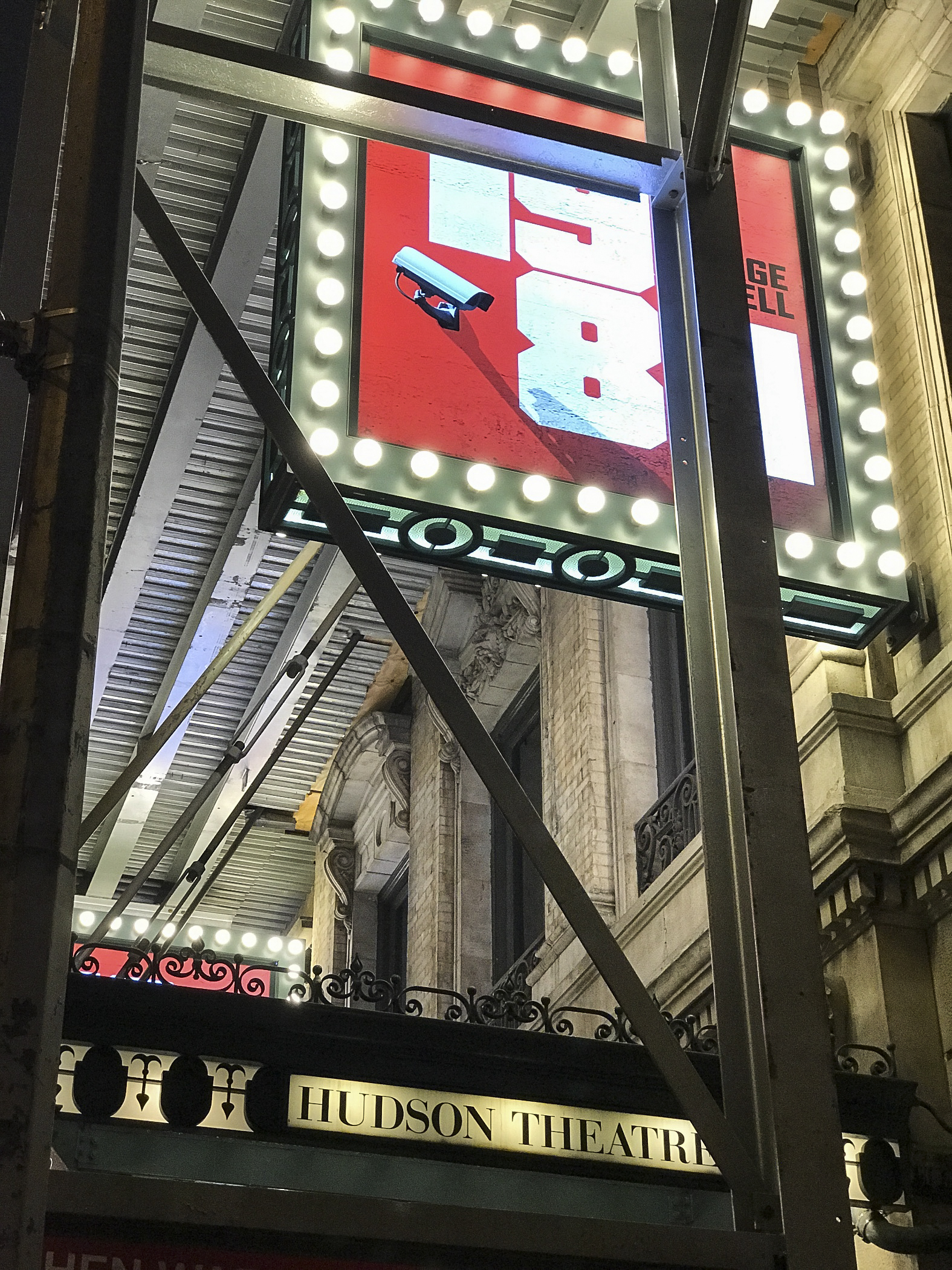
The facade sign showing 1984 (2017)

During March 2015, Playbill reported that Howard Panter of the British company Ambassador Theatre Group (later ATG Entertainment) might convert the Hudson back into a Broadway theater. That December, an ATG subsidiary signed a lease with M&C Hotels with the intention of converting the Hudson back to a Broadway venue. The renovation included technical upgrades as well as expansions to the backstage and front of house areas. The Tony Awards Administration Committee ruled in October 2016 that the Hudson Theatre was a Tony-eligible theater, with "970 seats without the use of the orchestra pit and 948 seats when the orchestra pit is utilized by a production". The New York state government also nominated the Hudson Theatre for inclusion on the National Register of Historic Places (NRHP). The theater was added to the NRHP on November 15, 2016.

The Hudson reopened with a revival of the Stephen Sondheim musical Sunday in the Park with George. Stars Jake Gyllenhaal and Annaleigh Ashford participated in a ribbon-cutting ceremony on February 8, 2017. The Hudson became the 41st Broadway theater and was both the newest and oldest Broadway theater in operation. The reopened Hudson hosted productions such as 1984 (2017), The Parisian Woman (2017), Head over Heels (2018), Burn This (2019), and American Utopia (2019). The theater closed on March 12, 2020, due to the COVID-19 pandemic. Another engagement of American Utopia, planned for the Hudson before the pandemic, moved to the St. James Theatre. The Hudson reopened on February 22, 2022, with previews of Plaza Suite, which officially ran from March to July 2022. This was followed in October 2022 by a limited revival of Death of a Salesman, which ran for three months. A revival of A Doll's House opened at the Hudson in March 2023, running for three months.

ATG and Jujamcyn Theaters also agreed to merge in early 2023; the combined company operated seven Broadway theaters, including the Hudson. Comedian Alex Edelman's one-man show Just for Us opened at the Hudson in June 2023 and ran for eight weeks, and a revival of Merrily We Roll Along opened in October 2023 and ran at the theater until July 2024. A revival of Once Upon a Mattress was subsequently staged from August to November 2024. Simon Rich's play All In: Comedy About Love opened at the theater on December 10, 2024, for a 10-week engagement, followed in April 2025 by the musical The Last Five Years and in September 2025 by the play Waiting for Godot. The play Every Brilliant Thing opened at the Hudson in March 2026 for a two-month run. A revival of Other Desert Cities opened at the theater in October 2026 for a run scheduled through January 2027.

== Notable productions ==
=== Hudson Theatre ===
Productions are listed by the year of their first performance. This list only includes Broadway shows; it does not include other live shows or films presented at the theater. Live shows that were presented when the theater operated as the Savoy nightclub are listed under § The Savoy.

Notable productions at the theater
Opening year	Name	Refs.
1903	The Marriage of Kitty	
1905	Man and Superman	
1907	Brewster's Millions	
1908	Lady Frederick	
1909	Arsène Lupin	
1912	Frou-Frou	
1913	General John Regan	
1914	Lady Windermere's Fan	
1915	Alice in Wonderland	
1917	Our Betters	
1918	Friendly Enemies	
1921	Nemesis	
1922	The Voice From the Minaret	
1922	Fedora	
1922	So This Is London	
1924	The Fake	
1926	The Noose	
1927	The Plough and the Stars	
1929	Hot Chocolates	
1930	The Inspector General	
1931	Doctor X	
1932	The Show-off	
1937	An Enemy of the People	
1937	The Amazing Dr. Clitterhouse	
1938	Good Hunting	
1939	Lew Leslie's Blackbirds	
1940	Love for Love	
1941	All Men Are Alike	
1943	Run, Little Chillun	
1943	Arsenic and Old Lace	
1945	State of the Union	
1949	Detective Story	
1960	Toys in the Attic	
1962	Ross	
1963	Strange Interlude	
1967	How to Be a Jewish Mother	
2017	Sunday in the Park with George	
2017	1984	
2017	The Parisian Woman	
2018	Head over Heels	
2019	Burn This	
2019	American Utopia	
2022	Plaza Suite	
2022	Death of a Salesman	
2023	A Doll's House	
2023	Just for Us	
2023	Merrily We Roll Along	
2024	Once Upon a Mattress	
2024	All In: Comedy About Love	
2025	The Last Five Years	
2025	Waiting for Godot	
2026	Every Brilliant Thing	
2026	Other Desert Cities	

=== The Savoy ===
- 1981: Genesis
- 1982: Rufus & Chaka Khan – Stompin' at the Savoy – Live
- 1983: King Sunny Adé and his African Beats

== Box office record ==
Plaza Suite previously set the Hudson Theatre's box-office record with a gross of US$1,708,387 over one week in June 2022. The record was later broken by Merrily We Roll Along, which grossed US$1,471,644 over one week in November 2023. The current record as of 2025 is held by All In: Comedy About Love, which grossed US$2,080,707 for the week ending on February 2, 2025.

== See also ==
- List of Broadway theaters
- List of New York City Designated Landmarks in Manhattan from 14th to 59th Streets
- National Register of Historic Places listings in Manhattan from 14th to 59th Streets
