= Kildare of Storm =

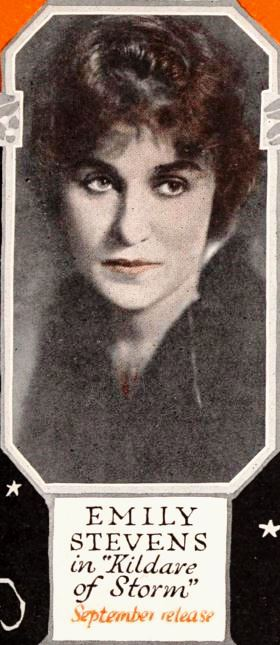
- Film's promotion in Exhibitors Herald
- Directed by: Harry L. Franklin; P. Thad Volkman (ass't director)
- Written by: June Mathis; Jere F. Looney
- Based on: Kildares of Storm by Eleanor Mercein Kelly
- Produced by: Maxwell Karger
- Starring: Emily Stevens; King Baggot
- Cinematography: Arthur Martinelli
- Production company: Metro Pictures
- Distributed by: Metro Pictures
- Release date: September 16, 1918
- Running time: 5 reels
- Country: United States
- Language: Silent (English intertitles)

Kildare of Storm is a lost 1918 American silent drama film produced and distributed by Metro Pictures and directed by Harry L. Franklin. It stars Broadway actress Emily Stevens. June Mathis and Jere F. Looney provided the scenario.

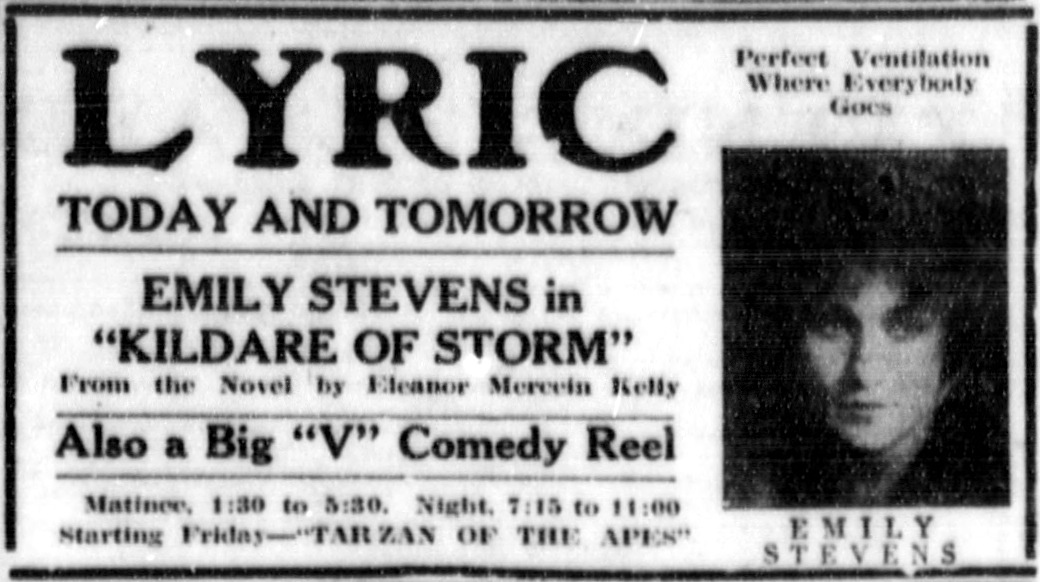
Newspaper add.

== Plot ==
As described in a film magazine, Kate (Stevens), urged on by her ambitious mother (Lindroth), weds Basil Kildare (Baggot), the last of the famous Kildares of Kentucky, and goes to Storm, the family estate, to live. Her husband proves to be a beast, and Kate and Dr. Jacques Benoix (Kent), Basil's best friend, fall in love despite their mutual knowledge that they should not. When Basil is slain, Jacques is convicted of murder. He is pardoned after five years and devotes his life to curing the sick at a mountain sanitarium. Mahaly (Short), former housekeeper to the Kildares, comes to the sanitarium and confesses on her deathbed that it was she that slew Basil because he had wronged her. Exonerated before the world, Dr. Benoix feels justified in claiming his happiness with Kate.

== Cast ==
- Emily Stevens as Kate Kildare
- King Baggot as Basil Kildare
- Crauford Kent as Dr. Jacques Benoix
- Florence Short as Mahaly
- Edwards Davis as Gov. Claiborne
- Helen Lindroth as Mrs. Leigh
- Maggie Breyer as Mrs. Benoix
- Fred Warren (Undetermined role) (credited as Fred H. Warren)

== Reception ==
Like many American films of the time, Kildare of Storm was subject to cuts by city and state film censorship boards. For example, the Chicago Board of Censors required a cut, in Reel 1, two closeups of baby in crib to include the first kidnapping scene, and, Reel 4, two closeups of men fighting on the ground.
