= The Broken Wing (play) =

1920 play by Charles W. Goddard and Paul Dickey

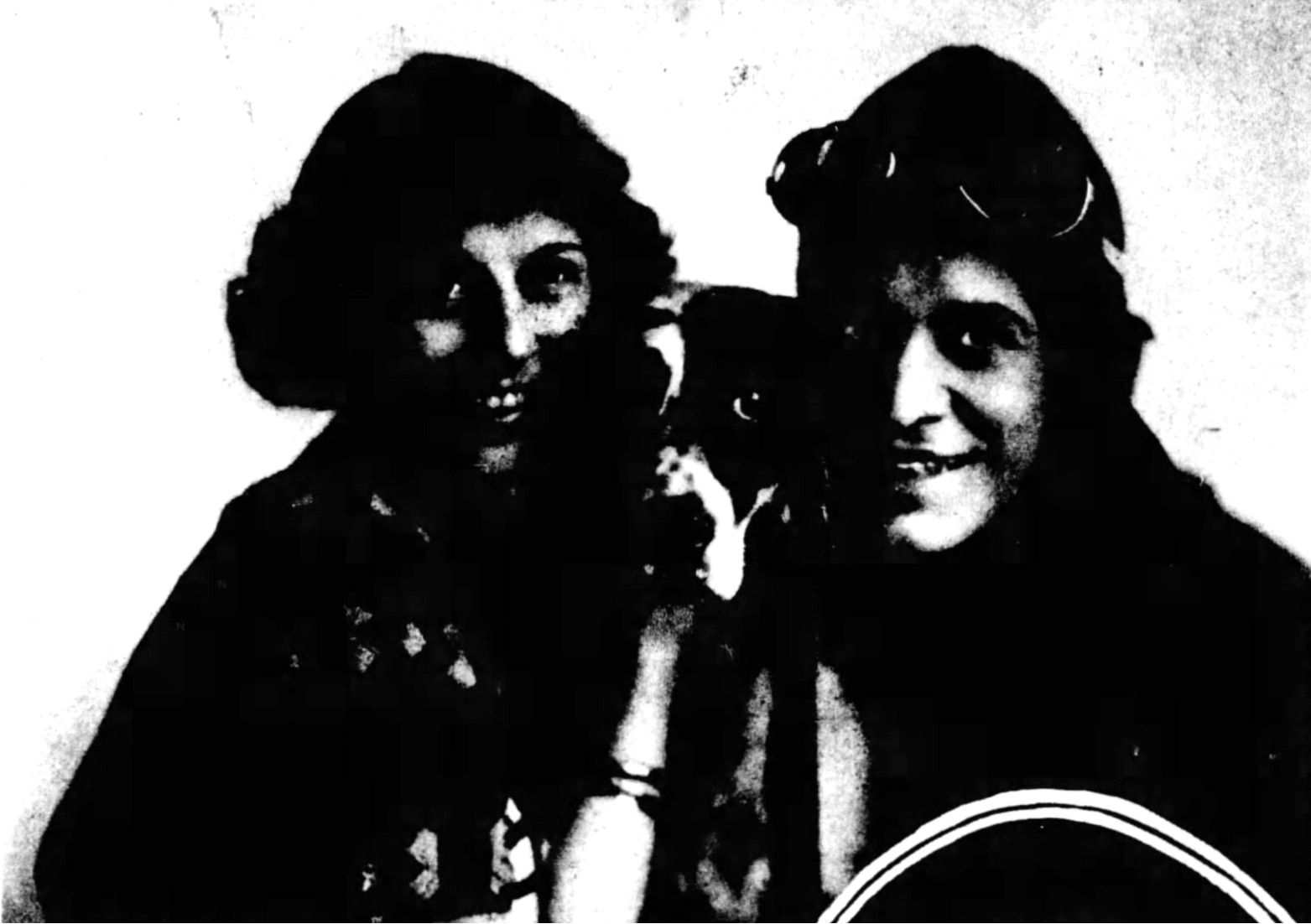
- Inez Plummer, Babe Sundance, and Charles Trowbridge
- Original language: English
- Written by: Charles W. Goddard and Paul Dickey
- Subject: Romantic triangle
- Genre: Melodrama
- Setting: Farley's hacienda in Mexico

Premiere
- Date: November 29, 1920
- Place: 48th Street Theatre
- Directed by: Paul Dickey

The Broken Wing is a 1920 play by Charles W. Goddard and Paul Dickey. It is a melodrama in four acts, with three settings and eleven characters. The story concerns a young Mexican woman who loves an injured American aviator while herself pursued by an ambivalent Mexican army officer. The action of the play takes place on three days over the course of a month. The production was widely known for showing an airplane crashing into the first act setting, an effect that used forty stagehands and required constant repairs and rebuilding.

The play was first produced and staged by Paul Dickey for a one-week tryout in Cleveland during April 1920. It was later produced by Sargent Aborn, and again staged by Paul Dickey, with sets by P. Dodd Ackerman. Its leading players were Inez Plummer and Alphonz Ethier. The opening tour began in Binghamton, New York during late August 1920. The Broadway premiere came in late November 1920, with the run lasting to early July 1921 for 253 performances. The play featured an original song Adelai in Act III, composed by Joseph Calleia with lyrics by George Abbott, both of whom were in the cast. The airplanes used were supplied by Curtis Engineering Corporation.

The play went on national tour in August 1921, but was never revived on Broadway. The Broken Wing served as the basis for a 1921 novelization of the play that ran as a newspaper serial, a 1923 silent film, and a 1932 film.

== Characters ==
Lead

- Innocencio dos Santos was a supporter of Carranza, a captain in the Constitutional Army, now a bandit chief.
- Inez Villera is a young Mexican woman, raised by Luther Farley, who prays for a peaceful, good husband.

Supporting

- Luther Farley is a retired American sea captain living in Mexico, who opposes Inez marrying Philip.
- Philip Marvin is an American aviator who during a storm crashes into Farley's house, and suffers amnesia.

Featured

- Quechita is a servant to Farley with a talent for reading fortunes in cards and potato peels.
- Jerry Waldron is Philip Marvin's companion in the aircraft; he is mortally injured in the crash.
- Sylvester Cross is an American "oil man", a New York shyster associated with Captain Santos.
- Gen. Panfilo Aguilar has a bad reputation; he has been sent from Mexico City to take over Santos' little command.
- Basilio is a musical Mexican soldier, orderly to General Aguilar, fond of Quechita.
- Cecelia is an American woman who claims to be Philip's wife, but is something more than she seems.
- Josa and Balboa were young girls, servants to Farley; these characters were dropped from cast lists before Broadway.

Bit Player

- Marco is a silent soldier who steals the aviator's property, which is then confiscated by his superior. (Note: This role is credited in cast lists to the ubiquitous George Spelvin.)
- Servants to Farley, Santos' men

Canine

- Babe Sundance is an English terrier, also a passenger in the airplane. (Note: Originally given the stage name "Spot", this was Paul Dickey's dog, which had flown with him in France during World War I.)

== Synopsis ==
This synopsis is compiled from contemporaneous newspaper reviews and the novelization published in The Brooklyn Daily Times. The dialogue is sprinkled with the term "greaser", which the Mexican characters use in reference to themselves when speaking English.

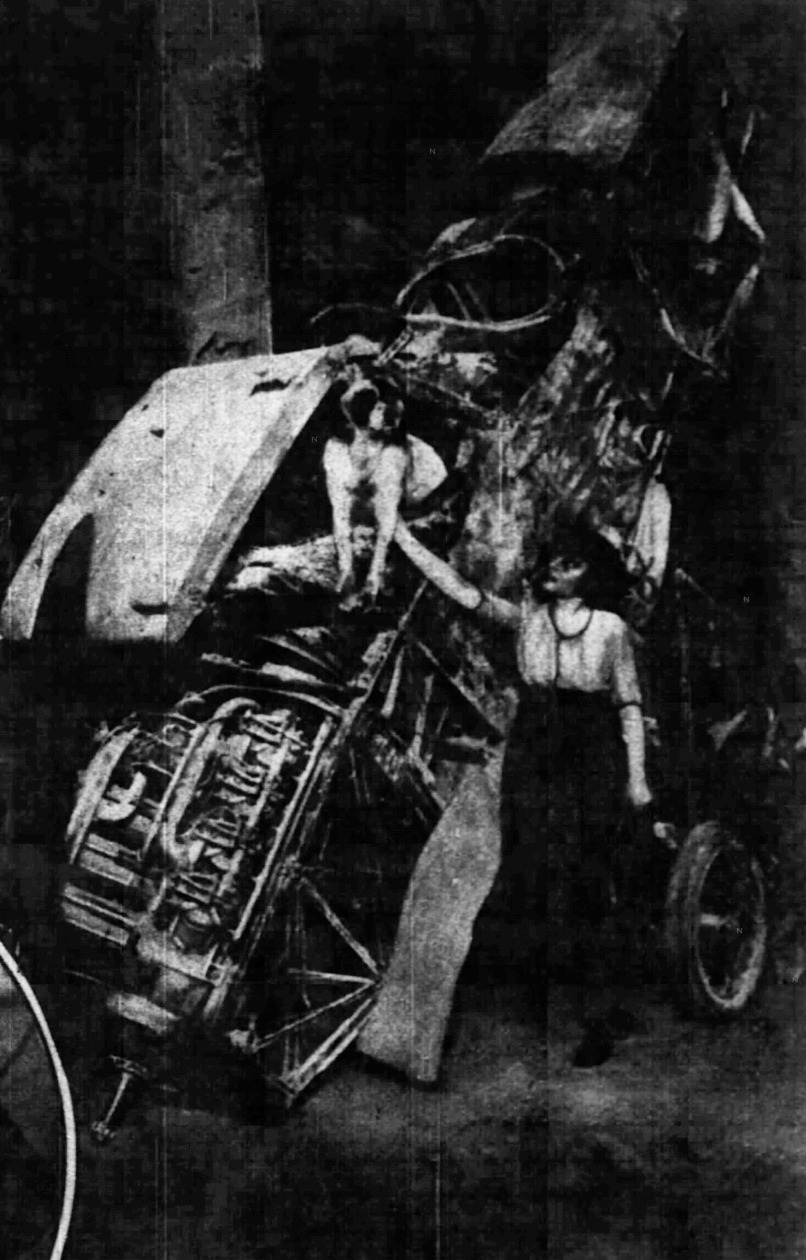

Act I (Scene 1:Living room of Farley's home in Mexico. Late afternoon.) Inez Villera has grown into a beautiful young woman, attracting young men in the area of Luther Farley's hacienda. Farley has raised the girl from infancy. He taught Inez to know the Bible and to love cleanliness. This has spoiled her for the local swains, who regard soap as effeminate. However, Captain Santos decides Inez is worth the sacrifice, so he bathes and brushes his teeth regularly to win her. But Inez is aware of Santos' predilection for "little loves" and violence. Santos presses Inez to marry him in Farley's presence. Knowing her foster father will suffer if she refuses outright, Inez excuses herself. She and Quechita decide Inez should stall in hopes of another suitor appearing. Inez tells Santos she will answer him in thirty days, as a storm is heard in the distance. Quechita excitedly tells Inez the storm will bring her a gringo lover. (Blackout)

(Scene 2:The sky over Farley's home, amidst an electrical storm.) Far overhead, (Note: From a description in a newspaper review, this scene was accomplished using a scale model of the airplane against a dark set, simulating the sky during a severe thunderstorm. Electrical effects predominated, and the voices of Philip and Jerry were heard, despite engine noise, thunder and wind.) Philip and Jerry in a Curtiss JN-4 have lost their bearings in the storm; driving rain and hail destroy the support for their left wing. They spiral down but Philip is able to flatten their dive just above the treetops. (Blackout)

(Scene 3: Same as Scene 1) The plane crashes into the adobe home of Farley. Jerry is ejected from the plane's second seat and lies crippled on Farley's floor. Philip, unconscious at first, is still in the cockpit. Jerry's voice rouses him for a short while, but silence falls as Jerry dies. Santos' soldier Marco lifts Philip out of the cockpit, then rifles his pockets. Inez finds a dog, Babe Sundance, in the cargo area behind the pilot's seat. (Curtain)

Act II (The patio of Farley's home. Next morning.) Inez has tended Philip all night. Aside from Jerry and the plane, he can remember nothing of his former life. Farley says he may recover his memory from some unexpected source. Inez is convinced God has sent him to be her husband. Santos has had his men free the aircraft from the house and move it to the broad patio. Farley and Santos are both alarmed at the devotion Inez shows the wounded aviator. General Aquilar arrives with Basilio and attempts to relieve Santos of command. But Santos is unbudging, knowing the general is escaping from his own troubles. They allow Farley to persuade them to make peace for now, but agree privately that they must have a shootout later. Santos has his men fetch Sylvester Cross, who protests at being arrested, but soon reaches an agreement. From Philip's platinum cigarette case they deduce his name. The General tries to seize both Philip and the plane, but meets his end offstage in a pistol duel with Santos. Inez and Santos quarrel over Philip, but Cross returns to say the aviator is from a wealthy family. Santos sends Cross to New York to get a $100,000 ransom; Cross may keep any amount over that. No longer annoyed with Philip, Santos sets Basilio, who has transferred allegiance, to take over tending him from Inez. (Curtain)

Act III (Same as Act II. One month later, in afternoon.) Santos has left to mend political fences with Mexico City. Santos' men had started repairing the airplane, reattaching the wings and replacing the ruined propeller with a spare found in the fuselage. As Farley healed, he found his fingers remembered better than his mind how the parts of the plane were supposed to be attached. Inez discouraged this work, fearing he would fly away and not return, but Farley encouraged it, saying it would help him heal. Basilio, under orders from Santos, watches over Philip, smothering him with tender care and making it difficult for Inez to be alone with him. Basilio sings a tender serenade, Adelai, as he works with Farley and Philip on the plane, trying to soften Quechita's heart. The song of the whippoorwills disturbs Philip; the three-note sequence stirs something in his mind. Basilio relaxes his vigilance, allowing Inez and Philip to escape the hacienda briefly. Santos is upset with Basilio when he finds the couple gone, but they soon return. Santos tells them Cross is coming. He shows Philip the cigarette case, allowing him to see the name. Philip understands now he is a prisoner held for ransom. (Curtain)

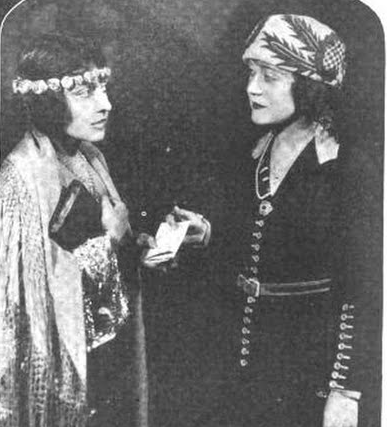

Act IV (Same as Act III. Later that day.) Cross returns with Cecelia, whom he introduces as Mrs. Marvin. Philip is suspicious of both Cross and her. Santos eyes Cecelia's jewelry, until Inez appears. Inez announces that she and Philip were married by the padre that afternoon. Farley explains the marriage cannot be valid, as Philip is already wed. When Inez understands Cecelia means to take Philip away, she draws a stiletto but is stopped from stabbing her rival by Santos. After much argument, she finally goes to her room at Farley's order. Again the whippoorwills sing, and Philip finds an echo in the opening notes of Over There; his memory comes flooding back, and he starts towards Cecelia, but stops short. Cecelia says it will be much better if she and Philip fly back, so he goes to start the plane. Santos gets Cross aside and asks about the ransom. Cross explains the jewels are worth much more than $100,000. Cecelia gives Santos the jewels in return for Philip. Inez, now reconciled to losing Philip, makes her peace with Cecelia, who hands her a note. Philip then secretly instructs Inez to fetch the dog, and to climb into the airplane with it. The plane takes off, puzzling Farley and Santos, since Cecelia is leaving with Cross in his old Ford. Not knowing Inez is in the plane, they are startled when her slipper comes tumbling down from the sky. Inside it is a note saying the jewels are fake, and signed "Cecelia Lane, US Secret Service". Santos laments what is an honest greaser to do in the face of such gringo perfidy. (Curtain)

== Original production ==
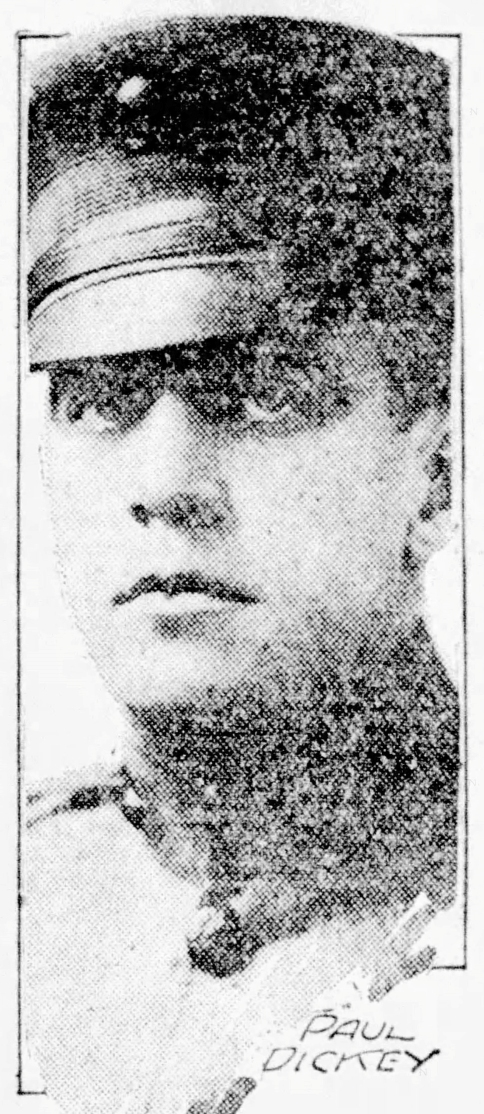
Paul Dickey 1918

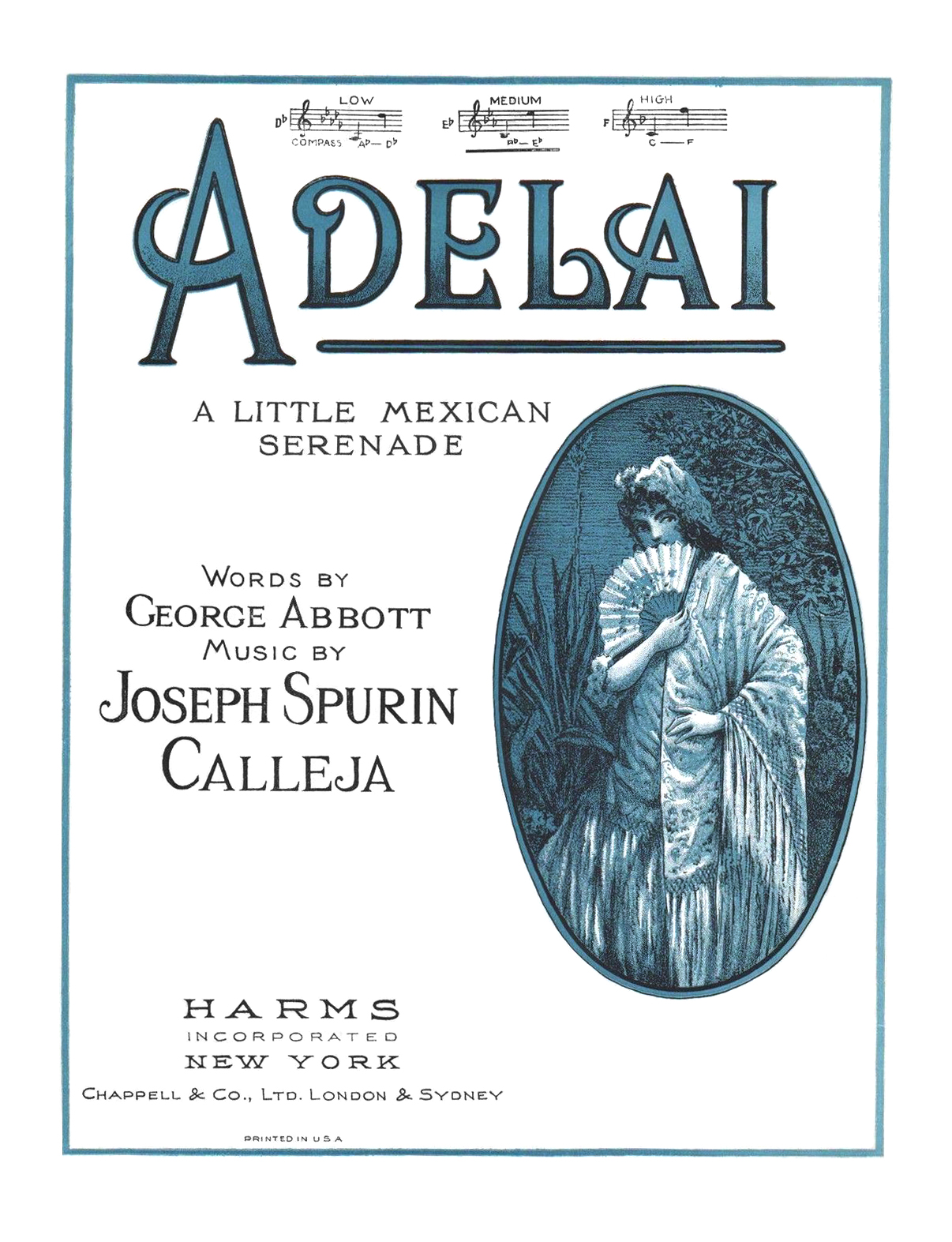

=== Background ===
The Broken Wing was the fifth Broadway collaboration between playwrights Paul Dickey and Charles W. Goddard, who were brothers-in-law. It came five years after their last joint effort, Miss Information. The title originated from an incident that happened to Paul Dickey during World War I, when he was on a bombing raid over the U-boat base at Zeebrugge. Another aircraft flying above his dropped a bomb that punched a hole in Dickey's left wing. The plane spiraled into the ground, but Dickey escaped serious injury.

Dickey produced and staged the play himself for a one-week tryout during April 1920 at Cleveland's Prospect Theatre. He also picked up tools to work with stagehands on setting up the airplane for its crash into Farley's living room. The company he brought from New York was headed by Thurston Hall as Capt. dos Santos and Inez Plummer as Inez Villera. Plummer had been with Paul Dickey in vaudeville for years; they were quietly married in June 1919, and no reviewer of The Broken Wing mentioned their relationship. Others in the tryout cast were Richard Barbee as Philip Malvin and Ann MacDonald as Cecelia. Harlowe R. Hoyt said the airplane crash at the end of the first act was "a climax of such force that what follows after palls", and suggested it be moved later in the play.

A New York newspaper reported in May 1920 that Sargent Aborn would produce The Broken Wing at the start of the next season. Aborn was known for producing light operas. William A. Brady, sometimes listed as producer, was involved only as the owner of the 48th Street Theatre. In late July it was reported that rehearsals for the production would begin the following week, while a further article mentioned that casting was complete in mid-August.

George Abbott, who played the American oilman Cross, had previously worked for Paul Dickey on Broadway and in vaudeville. He wrote in his 1963 memoir that the song Adelai grew out of a tune that Joseph Spurin Calleia, who played Basilio, would hum as he went about doing his bit during rehearsals. Cast and crew in the production liked the tune and asked about it. Knowing he was an aspiring playwright, Calleia approached Abbott about writing lyrics for it, and the resulting song was incorporated into the third act of The Broken Wing. The song had little impact during the show's run, but started getting popular on radio in 1927, earning Abbott $2000 in royalties during a single year. Abbott described his lyrics as "perfectly horrible".

=== Cast ===
Cast from the opening tour through the Broadway run. The production was on hiatus from October 14 through November 28, 1920.
Role	Actor	Dates	Notes and sources
Capt. Santos	Alphonz Ethier	Aug 27, 1920 - Jun 04, 1921	
Capt. Santos	Thurston Hall	Jun 06, 1921 - Jul 02, 1921	Hall reprised the role from the original tryout in Cleveland during April 1920.
Inez Villera	Inez Plummer	Aug 27, 1920 - Jul 02, 1921	
Luther Farley	Henry Duggan	Aug 27, 1920 - Jul 02, 1921	
Philip Marvin	Charles Trowbridge	Aug 27, 1920 - Jul 02, 1921	
Quechita	Mary Worth	Aug 27, 1920 - Jul 02, 1921	
Jerry Waldron	Walter F. Scott	Aug 27, 1920 - Jul 02, 1921	
Sylvester Cross	George Abbott	Aug 27, 1920 - Jul 02, 1921	
Gen. Aguilar	Louis Wolheim	Aug 27, 1920 - Jul 02, 1921	Wolheim spoke Mexican Spanish, having spent years in the country, including time with the Maderistas.
Basilio	Joseph Spurin	Aug 27, 1920 - Jul 02, 1921	Besides acting and composing Adelai, Spurin was assistant stage manager and understudied all male roles.
Cecelia	Myrtle Tannehill	Aug 27, 1920 - May 14, 1921	
Cecelia	Helen Luttrell	May 16, 1921 - Jul 02, 1921	
Josa	Mary Bianchi	Aug 27, 1920 - Sep 15, 1921	This character was last mentioned during the Atlantic City run during the opening tour.
Balboa	Katherine Bianchi	Aug 27, 1920 - Sep 15, 1921	This character was last mentioned during the Atlantic City run during the opening tour.

=== Opening tour ===
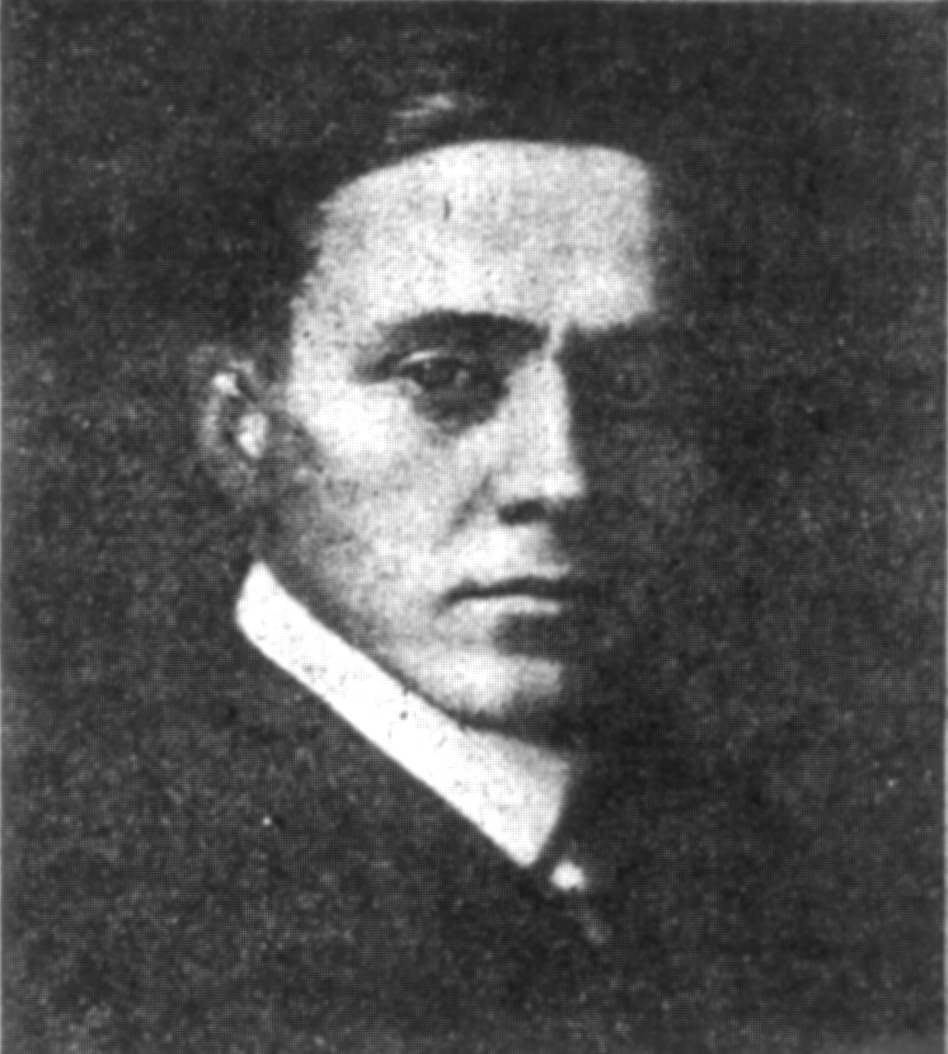
Charles W. Goddard

The Broken Wing started an opening tour at the Stone Opera House in Binghamton, New York on August 27, 1920. The local critic found no fault with the performers, who were well-rehearsed, but said the first act was too long, as mechanical effects caused long waits between scenes.

The production then went to Washington, D.C., Baltimore, Atlantic City, Boston, finishing on October 13, 1920, in playwright Goddard's hometown of Portland, Maine. The Plain Dealer, citing the Boston production, said "Decided alterations from the original are recorded", referencing the April tryout in Cleveland.

=== Broadway premiere and reception ===
The Broken Wing had its Broadway premiere at the 48th Street Theatre on November 29, 1920. The critic for The Brooklyn Daily Eagle judged that this was the best of that season's "Mexican plays", though Inez Plummer was not a big hit, merely pleasing. They thought Alphonz Ethier, George Abbott, and Joseph Spurin all did well, while limiting Charles Trowbridge to just a mention. The New York Herald reviewer thought "the most sensational scene of the season" was the airplane crashing through the adobe house wall, "sending it bursting about in the lightning flashes so that the patrons can nearly reach out and take a few bricks home as souvenirs". The New-York Tribune reviewer also thought the crash scene "done rather effectively and most dustily", and noted "some rather belated satire on the Mexican situation". They also praised the acting of Inez Plummer as done "with intelligence and with fire".

Boyle in the Daily News was also enthusiastic about the crash scene, citing "darkness, groans, flashes of fire and the smell of crumbled mortar". He also praised Plummer's acting, and that of Mary Worth as Quechita. The New York Times reviewer (Note: There was no byline, so it may have been George S. Kaufman or Brock Pemberton rather than their boss, Alexander Woollcott.) said it was "a strangely mixed piece of work", with elements of burlesque, melodrama, romance, and in the plane crash scene, realism. He thought it "always interesting and often amusing, although in the end it strives a bit desperately to please". George Abbott as Cross was considered the "most effective performance of the evening", with Joseph Spurin as Basilio also good. However, though Inez Plummer performed capably, the NYT reviewer thought the role of Inez Villera called for a "finer actress". Alexander Woollcott called it a "trick melodrama", and expressed surprise that Goddard and Dickey came up with the ingenious contrivance of the whippoorwill's song, in a work filled with lightweight gags. He also felt it should have gone with a Madame Butterfly ending, though he said Inez Plummer was "curiously deadening". George Jean Nathan thought The Broken Wing would do well commercially: the writers "show a flash of their quondam cunning" in what was merely a "three-cornered love story", with a sensational stage effect in the airplane crash, but he was unenthusiastic about the leads, Inez Plummer and Alphonz Ethier.

=== Broadway closing ===
On Thursday, June 30, 1920 The Broken Wing celebrated its 250th Broadway performance with a special invited audience of aviators from nearby airfields. It closed at the 48th Street Theatre on Saturday, July 2, 1920, after 253 performances. (Note: This included three performances, two evening and one matinee, since Thursday.) After the show closed, it was found necessary to rebuild half of the 48th Street Theatre stage due to the repeated crashes of the airplane upon it.

The Broken Wing opened its post-Broadway tour in Chicago at the Olympic Theater, on August 29, 1921, with substantially the same cast as before.

== Adaptations ==
=== Film ===
- The Broken Wing (1923)
- The Broken Wing (1932)

=== Literary ===
- The Broken Wing (1921) A novelization credited to Charles W. Goddard was first serialized in The Brooklyn Daily Times from May 16, 1921 through June 6, 1921.

== Bibliography ==
- George Abbott. Mister Abbott. Random House, 1963.
