= Tannehill =

Tannehill may refer to:

== People ==
- Adamson Tannehill (1750–1820), United States Representative from Pennsylvania
- Ivan Ray Tannehill (1890–1959), American meteorologist
- Jesse Tannehill, (1874–1956) Major League Baseball pitcher
- Lee Tannehill (1880–1938), Major League infielder, brother of Jesse Tannehill
- Myrtle Tannehill (1886–1977), American actress
- Ryan Tannehill (born 1988), American football quarterback
- Wilkins F. Tannehill (1787–1858), American Whig politician and author
- Linda and Morris Tannehill, co-authors of The Market for Liberty

== Places ==
- Tannehill Ironworks, a former iron furnace, now a historical state park in McCalla, Alabama
- Tannehill, Louisiana, unincorporated community in Winn Parish

== See also ==
- Tannahill (disambiguation)
