= The Four Flusher =

1919 film directed by Harry L. Franklin

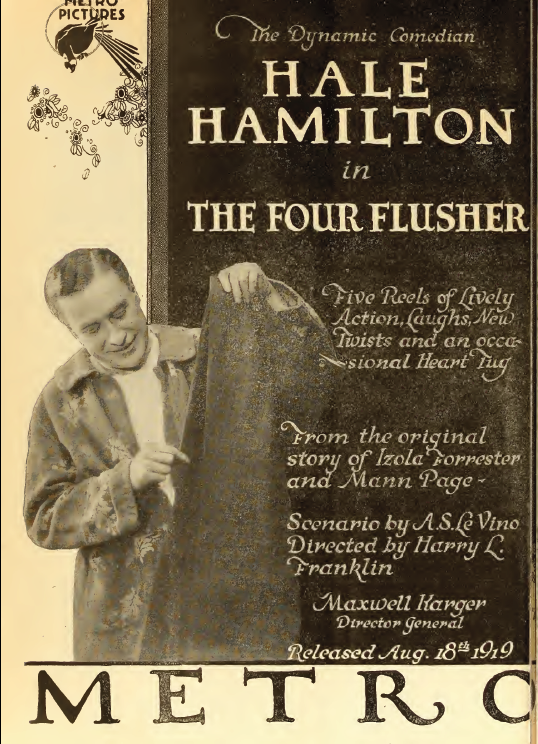
- Advertisement
- Directed by: Harry L. Franklin
- Written by: Albert S. Le Vino
- Story by: Izola Forrester and Mann Page
- Produced by: Maxwell Karger
- Starring: Hale Hamilton; Ruth Stonehouse
- Cinematography: Rudolph J. Bergquist
- Distributed by: Metro Pictures
- Release date: August 18, 1919
- Running time: 5 reels
- Country: United States
- Language: Silent (English intertitles)

The Four Flusher is a lost 1919 American silent comedy film directed by Harry L. Franklin and starring Hale Hamilton and Ruth Stonehouse. It was produced and distributed by Metro Pictures.

== Cast ==
- Hale Hamilton as Lon Withers
- Ruth Stonehouse as Suzanne Brooks
- Harry Holden as Josiah Brooks
- Ralph W. Bell as Penington Crane
- Robert Badger as Jimmie
- Louis Fitzroy as Ford
- Fred Malatesta as Senor Emanuelo Romez (credited as Frederick Malatesta)
- Effie Conley as Senora Flora Romez
