= Harry L. Franklin =

American film director

- Born: September 5, 1880; St. Louis, Missouri
- Died: July 3, 1927; Hollywood, California

Harry L. Franklin (September 5, 1880 – July 3, 1927) was a director of silent films in the United States.

== Life ==
Franklin was born in St. Louis, Missouri, and began his film directing career as an assistant to Edwin Carewe. He worked for Metro Pictures and directed several Hale Hamilton films. He was accused of smuggling alcohol in film canisters in violation of the Volstead Act.

Franklin married Mildred Dean. He was found dead in Hollywood, California, in July 1927, aged 46.

== Films ==
- The Secret Gift (1920)
- Rouge and Riches (1920)
- Her Five-Foot Highness (1920)
- After His Own Heart (1919)
- The Four-Flusher (1919)
- That's Good (1919)
- Johnny-on-the-Spot (1919)
- Full of Pep (1919)
- The Winning of Beatrice (1918)
- Kildare of Storm (1918)
- Sylvia on a Spree 1917
