= The Broken Wing (1923 film) =

1923 film by Tom Forman

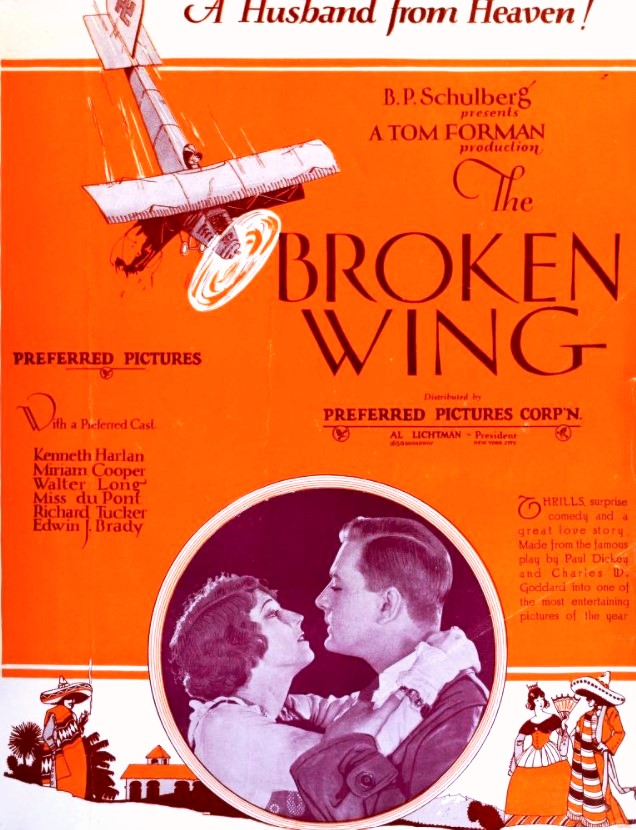
- Advertisement
- Directed by: Tom Forman
- Screenplay by: Tom Foreman
- Based on: The Broken Wing by Paul Dickey and Charles W. Goddard
- Starring: Kenneth Harlan; Miriam Cooper; Walter Long; Miss DuPont; Richard Tucker; Edwin J. Brady; Ferdinand Munier; Evelyn Selbie
- Cinematography: Harry Perry
- Production company: B. P. Schulberg Productions
- Distributed by: Preferred Pictures; Al Lichtman Corp.
- Release date: August 19, 1923
- Running time: 60 minutes
- Country: United States
- Language: Silent (English intertitles)

The Broken Wing is a 1923 American silent aviation comedy drama film directed by Tom Forman based on the play The Broken Wing by Paul Dickey and Charles W. Goddard. The film stars Kenneth Harlan, Miriam Cooper, and Walter Long. The Broken Wing was released on August 19, 1923. (Note: It was Miriam Cooper's final film and she hated it.).

== Plot ==
In a small Mexican town near the U.S. border during the Mexican Revolution, Captain Innocencio Dos Santos (Walter Long) rules the town with an iron fist. He pursues the beautiful Inez Villera (Miriam Cooper), claiming she is his "true love". When Philip "Phil" Marvin (Kenneth Harlan), an American pilot flying in Mexico is caught in stormy weather and crash-lands on a nearby ranch, Inez nurses him back to health. Phil falls in love with his nurse but he has lost his memory.

Inez had been praying for a husband and believes he will come "in a storm". She is sure that God has answered her prayers by sending him this handsome pilot. Innocencio does not like that he has a rival and arrests the pilot and threatens to kill him, before Inez intercedes. Luther Farley (Ferdinand Munier), a local guerrilla leader, also complicates matters. Phil finally recovers his memory, repairs his aircraft and flies away with Inez. The U.S. Secret Service apprehends Dos Santos.

== Cast ==
- Kenneth Harlan as Philip Marvin
- Miriam Cooper as Inez Villera
- Walter Long as Capt. Innocencio Dos Santos
- Miss DuPont as Celia
- Richard Tucker as Sylvester Cross
- Ed Brady as Bassilio (as Edwin J. Brady)
- Ferdinand Munier as Luther Farley
- Evelyn Selbie as Quichita

== Production ==
The play "The Broken Wing" opened at the 48th Street Theater in New York City on November 29, 1920, and ran for 171 performances.

Principal photography on The Broken Wing took place in Detroit and Truckee, California. While in production, cinematographer Harry Perry devised a camera mount that allowed him to film from a Curtiss JN-4 biplane. Using a camera mounted on the fuselage behind the rear cockpit, Perry was able to shoot the pilot in the front cockpit.

== Reception ==
Aviation film historian Stephen Pendo in Aviation in the Cinema (1985), considered The Broken Wing part of the theme of "Trouble in the air" that either involves passengers and crew in an emergency or the problems faced by survivors of an air-crash. In the case of The Broken Wing, the film "combined aviation comedy with the air-crash device in telling of a flier who crashes in Mexico and is nursed by Inez (Miriam Cooper)." Aviation film historian James M. Farmer in Celluloid Wings: The Impact of Movies on Aviation (1984), noted that the later 1932 film was a remake of the 1923 production. He also stated, "Little air action in either production."

== Preservation ==
With no copies of The Broken Wing in any film archives, it is a lost film.
