= Sylvia on a Spree =

1918 silent film directed by Harry L. Franklin

- Directed by: Harry L. Franklin
- Written by: June Mathis (scenario)
- Story by: Emil Forst
- Produced by: Maxwell Karger
- Starring: Emmy Wehlen; W. I. Percival; Frank Currier
- Cinematography: Arthur Martinelli
- Production company: Metro Pictures
- Release date: December 16, 1918 (US)
- Running time: 5 reels
- Country: United States
- Language: English

Sylvia on a Spree is a lost 1918 American silent comedy film directed by Harry L. Franklin and starring Emmy Wehlen, W. I. Percival, and Frank Currier. It was released on December 16, 1918.

== Cast ==
- Emmy Wehlen as Sylvia Fairponts
- W. I. Percival as Jack Bradley
- Frank Currier as Edwin Booth D'Aubrey
- Eugene Acker as Walter Fairponts
- Peggy Parr as Nonette
- Isabel O'Madigan as Mrs. Fairponts
- Rose Wood as Pearl
- Bliss Milford as Ruby
- Francesca Ward as Mme. Claire St. Claire
- Alice Turner as Egyptian dancer
