= The Brand (film) =

1914 film by Kenean Buel

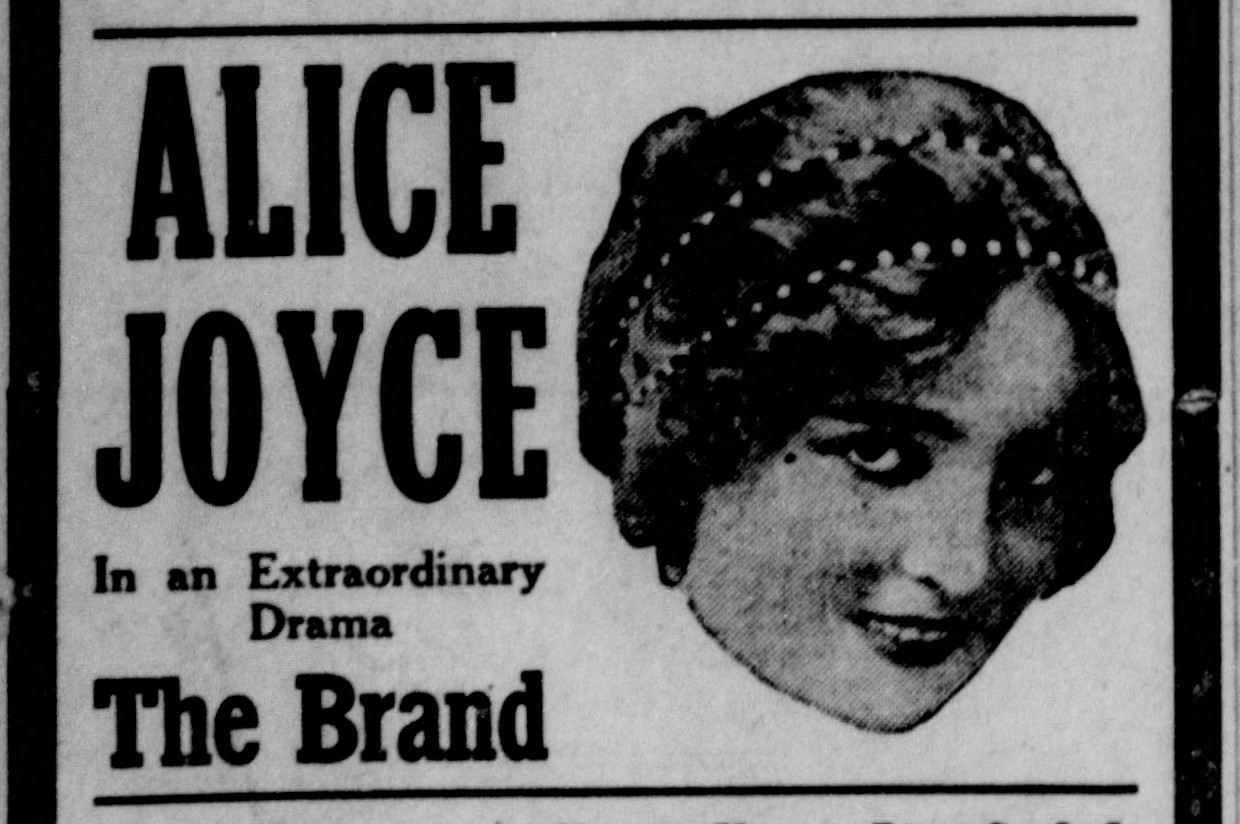
Contemporary newspaper advertisement

For the podcast Vince Russo's The Brand for The RELM Network see Vince Russo

The Brand is a silent film released in the U.S. in 1914. Jere F. Looney wrote the story for the film and Kenean Buel directed. It was a Kalem film in two parts. The story features a girl sent to a reformatory by her step-mother and a girl from the slums.

== Cast ==
- Alice Joyce as Mary
- Tom Moore
- Henry Hallam
- Helen Lindroth
- John E. Mackin
- Alice Hollister
- Mary Ross
- Doris Hollister

== Reception ==
The film received reviews from publications including New York Dramatic Mirror and Moving Picture World.
