= After His Own Heart =

1919 film directed by Harry L. Franklin

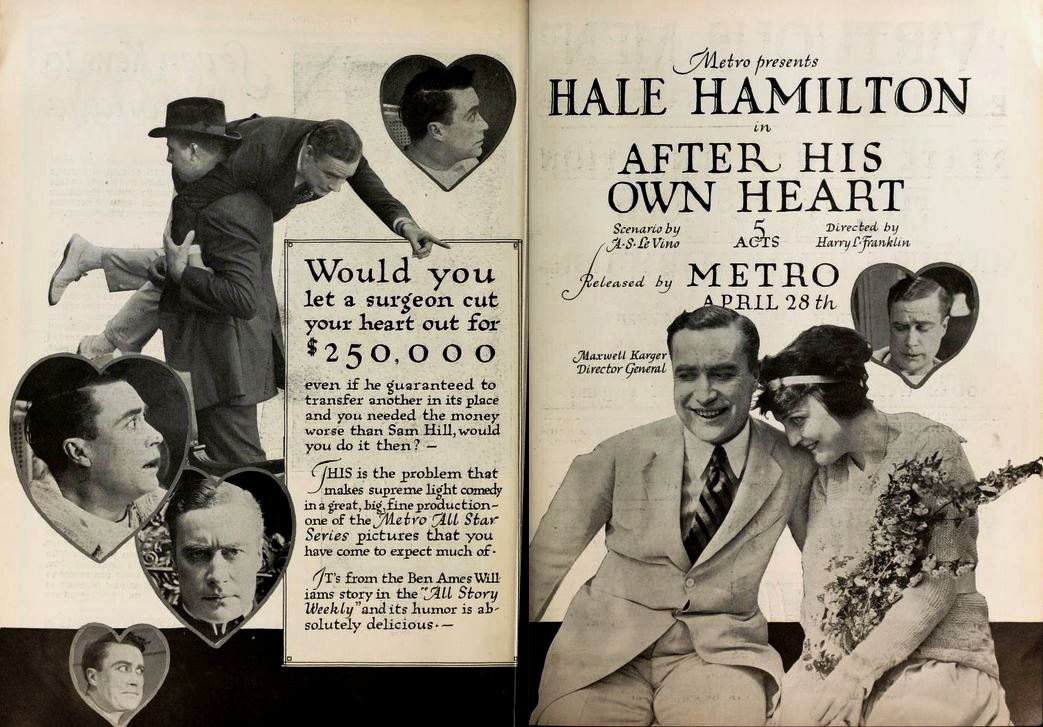
- Advertisement in Moving Picture World for After His Own Heart, 1919
- Directed by: Harry L. Franklin
- Written by: Albert Shelby Le Vino
- Based on: After His Own Heart by Ben Ames Williams
- Produced by: Maxwell Karger
- Starring: Hale Hamilton; Naomi Childers
- Cinematography: R.J. Bergquist
- Production company: Metro Pictures Corp.
- Distributed by: Metro Pictures Corp.
- Release date: April 1919
- Running time: 5 reels
- Country: United States
- Language: Silent (English intertitles)

After His Own Heart is a 1919 American silent comedy-drama film based on a 1919 short story of the same name by Ben Ames Williams. It was adapted for the screen by Albert Shelby Le Vino and directed by Harry L. Franklin. The film stars Hale Hamilton and Naomi Childers and was distributed by Metro Pictures Corp., a forerunner of Metro-Goldwyn-Mayer. A copy of the film is archived at the Cinémathèque Française under the title Une Cure Merveilleuse.

== Plot ==
Thomas Wentworth Duncan, a millionaire, faces the prospect of being broke after a fraudulent trustee absconds with his money. Duncan is now faced with getting a job to support himself, but he has never been accustomed to doing anything more strenuous than polo. Duncan has also fallen in love with Sally Reeves, an old flame, but he realizes he no longer has the fortune and lifestyle to which she is accustomed and obviously cannot ask her to marry him. After returning from a gala that he fully expects to be his last one with his elite friends, he finds a mysterious letter on his table inscribed "personal and important". The letter informs him that his financial woes are well known to the letter-writer and if he will give one month to an unexplained project, the sender will pay him $250,000. Duncan decides to reject the offer in the letter, but the thought of being with Sally makes him change his mind. The next day, a limousine arrives for Duncan and with it a huge man whom he names Goliath. Duncan is taken to the hospital of Dr. Spleen, a fanatic who wants to transplant Duncan's perfectly good heart into the body of Judah P. Corpus, Sally’s rich uncle, who wants to remain young. When Duncan learns that Spleen's previous heart transplant patients, which were two dogs, that both died, he becomes nervous and wants out of the deal, but he is prevented from leaving by Goliath. As Spleen is about to perform the operation, the excitement proves to be too much for him and he drops dead. Sally's uncle doesn't know that the Dr. has died, and thinks the operation has been performed. After leaving the hospital, Duncan receives news from the authorities that the trustee has been found and that his fortune is saved, so he and Sally can now get married.

== Cast ==
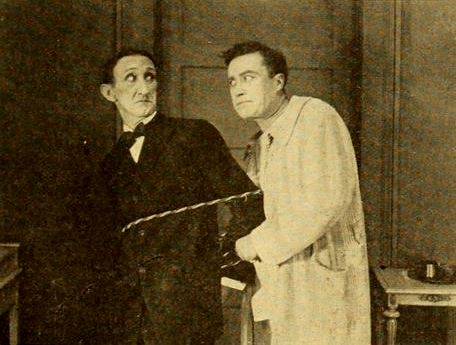
Film still with Frank Hayes and Hale Hamilton, featured in Moving Picture World (1919)

- Hale Hamilton — Thomas Wentworth Duncan
- Naomi Childers — Sally Reeves
- Mrs. Louis — Mrs. Martin
- Frank Hayes — Vincent
- Harry Carter — Dr. Spleen
- William V. Mong — Judah P. Corpus
- Herbert Pryor — Adrian Keep
- Stanley Sanford — Goliath

== Background ==
The film is based on the short story After His Own Heart by Ben Ames Williams, published in All-Story Weekly, January 1919. Metro Pictures obtained the story especially for Hamilton, who was a popular stage comedian at the time. The studio thought his appeal would carry over into the film adaption. The publicity department at Metro suggested to exhibitors showing the film that they use tag lines to promote the film, such as: "Thomas wanted to give his heart away and these people wanted to buy it! — and — What kind of heart is worth a quarter of a million dollars?" The studio was also concerned with the horror aspect of the plot, and assured exhibitors: “Don’t by any chance infer from the story that the picture has a gruesome touch. The theme is treated from the farce angle and unfolds many laughs without giving any ugly thrills.”

== Reviews and reception ==
Peter Milne wrote in his review for Motion Picture News, that the "various scenes between the hero and his captors have a high comedy value", but thought the early scenes were "held too long and the detail introduced is tiring". Overall, he said the film "brings a goodly number of laughs". In Hanford C. Judson's review for The Moving Picture World, he stated that the film has "touches of fresh humor" and noted that the character "most strikingly acted" was Dr. Spleen, played by Harry Carter. Judson opined that the part "fits him to perfection, and he makes the situation quite convincing." A review in the Exhibitors Herald was critical of the film, saying that "there are no incidents or story angles that bring forth more than mildly amused smiles from a chance audience". The Herald said that a "drop-in gathering" at a Chicago theater "seemed to find little in the play to amuse them".
