= Opportunity (film) =

1918 silent film directed by John H. Collins

- Directed by: John H. Collins
- Written by: John H. Collins
- Based on: the short story, "Opportunity" by Edgar Franklin
- Produced by: Maxwell Karger
- Starring: Viola Dana; Hale Hamilton; Frank Currier
- Cinematography: John Arnold
- Production company: Metro Pictures
- Release date: July 1, 1918 (US)
- Running time: 5 reels
- Country: United States
- Language: Silent (English intertitles)

Opportunity is a 1918 American silent comedy-drama film directed by John H. Collins. It stars Viola Dana, Hale Hamilton, and Frank Currier, and was released on July 1, 1918. A print of Opportunity exists in the George Eastman Museum Motion Picture Collection.

== Cast list ==
- Viola Dana as Mary Willard
- Hale Hamilton as Anthony Fry
- Frank Currier as Henry Clay Willard
- Edward Abeles as Johnson Bowler
- Sally Crute as Beatrice Bowler
- Joseph Burke as Robert Hitchins
- Francis D. Lyon as Wilkins
- Elsie MacLeod as Felice
