= The Brand of Satan =

1917 film directed by George Archainbaud

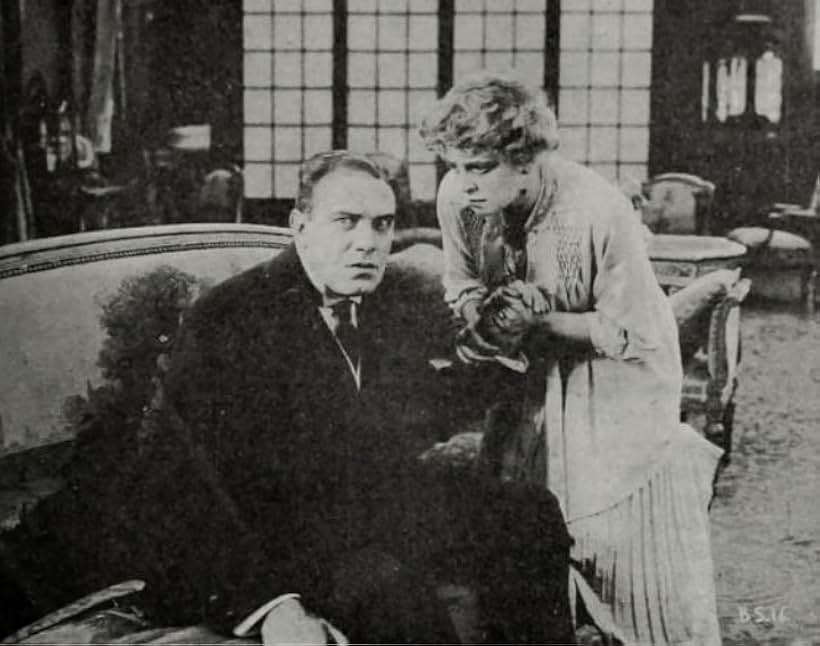
- Directed by: George Archainbaud
- Written by: Jere F. Looney
- Produced by: William A. Brady
- Starring: Montagu Love; Gerda Holmes; Evelyn Greeley
- Cinematography: Philip Hatkin
- Production company: Peerless Productions
- Distributed by: World Film
- Release date: July 9, 1917
- Running time: 55 minutes
- Country: United States
- Languages: Silent; English intertitles

The Brand of Satan is a 1917 American silent horror film directed by George Archainbaud and starring Montagu Love, Gerda Holmes and Evelyn Greeley.

== Cast ==
- Montagu Love as Jacques Cordet
- Gerda Holmes as Christine
- Evelyn Greeley as Natalia
- Al Hart as Manuel Le Grange
- Nat C. Gross as Francois Villier
- J. Herbert Frank as Jacques Despard
- Emile La Croix as Pere Sechard
- Katherine Johnston as Marie

== Censorship ==
Initially, The Brand of Satan was rejected in its entirety by the Kansas Board of Review, but was approved the next day upon reevaluation. The only change was an added intertitle, referring to Le Grange as Christine's husband.

== Bibliography ==
- James Robert Parish & Michael R. Pitts. Film directors: a guide to their American films. Scarecrow Press, 1974.
