= Fred Malatesta =

American actor (1889–1952)

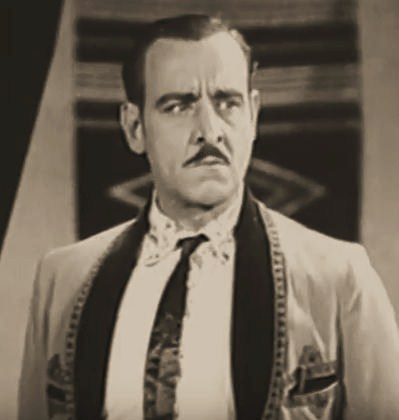
- Malatesta in Wings of Adventure (1930)
- Born: April 18, 1889; Naples, Italy
- Died: April 8, 1952 (aged 62); Burbank, California, US
- Occupation: Actor
- Years active: 1915–1941

Fred Malatesta (April 18, 1889 – April 8, 1952) was an American film actor. He appeared in more than 110 films between 1915 and 1941. He was born in Naples, Italy, and died in Burbank, California.

== Selected filmography ==
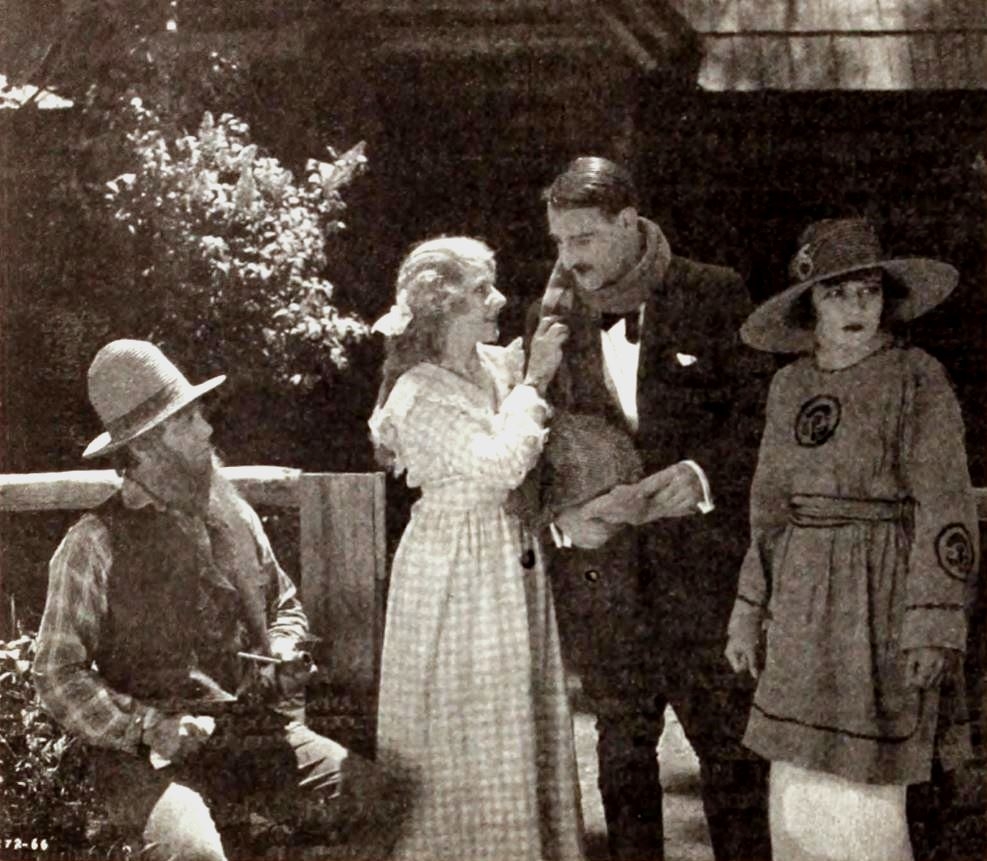
Malatesta (second from right) in The Valley of Tomorrow (1920)

- Sherlock Holmes (1916) - 'Lightfoot' McTague
- The Legion of Death (1918) - Grand Duke Paul
- The Claim (1918) - Ted 'Blackie' Jerome
- The Demon (1918) - Count Theodore de Seramo
- The Border Raiders (1918) - 'Square Deal' Dixon
- The Greatest Thing in Life (1918) - (uncredited)
- Terror of the Range (1919) - Black John
- Full of Pep (1919) - General Lopanzo
- The Devil's Trail (1919) - Dubec
- The Four-Flusher (1919) - Señor Emanuelo Romez
- The Valley of Tomorrow (1920) - Enrico Colonna
- The Best of Luck (1920) - Lanzana
- Big Happiness (1920) - Raoul de Bergerac
- The Challenge of the Law (1920) - Jules Lafitte
- The Sins of Rosanne (1920) - Syke Ravenal
- Risky Business (1920) - Ralli
- All Dolled Up (1921) - Amilo Rodolpho
- The Mask (1921) - Señor Enrico Keralio
- Little Lord Fauntleroy (1921) - Dick
- The Woman He Loved (1922) - Max Levy
- White Shoulders (1922) - Maurice, a Modiste
- Refuge (1923) - Gustav Kenski
- The Girl Who Came Back (1923) - Ramon Valhays
- The Man Between (1923) - Joe Cateau
- The Lullaby (1924) - Pietro
- The Night Hawk (1924) - José Valdez
- The Reckless Age (1924) - Manuel Gonzáles
- Broadway or Bust (1924) - Count Dardnelle
- Honor Among Men (1924) - Count De Winter
- Forbidden Paradise (1924) - French ambassador
- Without Mercy (1925) - Ducrow
- Madame Mystery (1926, Short) - Man of a Thousand Eyes
- Kiki (1926) - Cheron, the Tenor (uncredited)
- Long Fliv the King (1926, Short) - Hamir of Uvocado - the Prime Minister
- Bardelys the Magnificent (1926) - Castelrous
- Get 'Em Young (1926, Short) - Executor
- Eve's Love Letters (1927, Short) - Mr. X's Accomplice (uncredited)
- The Wagon Show (1928) - Vicarino
- The Gate Crasher (1928) - Julio
- The Peacock Fan (1929) - Thomas Elton
- The Black Book (1929, Serial) - Sudro
- El precio de un beso (1930)
- Wings of Adventure (1930) - Don Ricardo Diaz San Pablo La Pandella - 'La Panthera'
- Caught Cheating (1931) - Tobey Moran
- La mujer X (1931) - LaRoque
- The Big Trail (1931) - Bascom
- Possessed (1931) - Party Waiter (uncredited)
- The Passionate Plumber (1932) - Tony's Second (uncredited)
- Whistlin' Dan (1932) - Pedro - Henchman (uncredited)
- The Man from Yesterday (1932) - Gendarme (uncredited)
- Get That Girl (1932) - Dr. Sandro Tito
- Trouble in Paradise (1932) - Hotel Manager (uncredited)
- A Farewell to Arms (1932) - Manera (uncredited)
- The Girl in 419 (1933) - Hotel Arcady Manager (uncredited)
- Laughing at Life (1933) - Capt. Garcia (uncredited)
- Beer and Pretzels (1933, Short) - Restaurant manager (uncredited)
- L'amour guide (1933)
- What's Your Racket? (1934) - Benton
- Riptide (1934) - Headwaiter (uncredited)
- Picture Brides (1934) - Castro
- Granaderos del amor (1934) - Comandante
- The Thin Man (1934) - Joe - Headwaiter (uncredited)
- Call It Luck (1934) - Judge Venturini (uncredited)
- Student Tour (1934) - French Manager (uncredited)
- The Merry Widow (1934) - Ambassador (uncredited)
- The Gay Bride (1934) - French Officer (uncredited)
- Enter Madame (1935) - Hotel Clerk (uncredited)
- Let's Live Tonight (1935) - Headwaiter (uncredited)
- Fighting Shadows (1935) - Duquesne (uncredited)
- Under the Pampas Moon (1935) - Doorman (uncredited)
- Love Me Forever (1935) - Italian Man (uncredited)
- The Crusades (1935) - William - King of Sicily
- Dressed to Thrill (1935) - Italian Captain (uncredited)
- 1,000 Dollars a Minute (1935) - La Valle (uncredited)
- A Night at the Opera (1935) - Stagehand (uncredited)
- The Lone Wolf Returns (1935) - French Official (uncredited)
- Senor Jim (1936) - Nick Zellini
- Modern Times (1936) - Cafe Head Waiter
- Lady of Secrets (1936) - French Official (uncredited)
- Under Two Flags (1936) - Chasseur Lieutenant (uncredited)
- Mary of Scotland (1936) - Minor Role (uncredited)
- Anthony Adverse (1936) - Stranger (uncredited)
- Dodsworth (1936) - Waiter on Last Ship (uncredited)
- Love on the Run (1936) - French Waiter (uncredited)
- Mama Steps Out (1937) - French Guard (scenes deleted)
- Espionage (1937) - French Pickpocket (uncredited)
- The Gold Racket (1937) - Ricardo (uncredited)
- The Bride Wore Red (1937) - Rudi's Waiter (uncredited)
- Conquest (1937) - Waiter (uncredited)
- Beg, Borrow or Steal (1937) - Majordomo (uncredited)
- The Black Doll (1938) - Esteban, the butler
- International Settlement (1938) - Italian Officer (uncredited)
- Four Men and a Prayer (1938) - Officer Under Gen. Sebastian (uncredited)
- Port of Seven Seas (1938) - Bird Seller (uncredited)
- I'll Give a Million (1938) - Gendarme (uncredited)
- Suez (1938) - Jewel Merchant (uncredited)
- Submarine Patrol (1938) - Italian Gendarme at the 'Maria Ann' (uncredited)
- Sharpshooters (1938) - Policeman (uncredited)
- Artists and Models Abroad (1938) - Treasury Official (uncredited)
- Blackwell's Island (1939) - Third Dockworker (uncredited)
- Love Affair (1939) - Shipboard Photographer (uncredited)
- Juarez (1939) - Señor Salas (uncredited)
- Bridal Suite (1939) - Cassini - in Shipboard Brawl (uncredited)
- Road to Singapore (1940) - Native Policeman (uncredited)
- Argentine Nights (1940) - Plainclothesman (uncredited)
- Rangers of Fortune (1940) - Genoa (uncredited)
- Down Argentine Way (1940) - Horserace Loser at Fiesta (uncredited)
- Arise, My Love (1940) - Spanish Mechanic (uncredited)
- The Mark of Zorro (1940) - Sentry (uncredited)
- That Night in Rio (1941) - Butler (scenes deleted)
- Blood and Sand (1941) - Waiter (uncredited)
- Week-End in Havana (1941) - Flores - Roulette Croupier (uncredited)
