= Tannahill =

Tannahill is a surname. Notable people with the surname include:

- Jordan Tannahill (born 1988), Canadian playwright and filmmaker
- Mary Tannahill (1863–1951), American artist
- Reay Tannahill (1929–2007), British author and historian
- Robert Tannahill (1774–1810), Scottish poet

== Other ==
- The Tannahill Weavers, traditional Scottish musical group active since 1968
- Tannehill (disambiguation)
