= Johnny-on-the-Spot =

1919 silent film directed by Harry L. Franklin

- Directed by: Harry L. Franklin
- Written by: June Mathis
- Screenplay by: Shannon Fife
- Produced by: Maxwell Karger
- Starring: Hale Hamilton; Louise Lovely; Philo McCullough
- Cinematography: Arthur Martinelli
- Production company: Metro Pictures
- Release date: February 17, 1919 (US)
- Running time: 5 reels
- Country: United States
- Language: English

Johnny-on-the-Spot is a 1919 American silent comedy film. Directed by Harry L. Franklin, the film stars Hale Hamilton, Louise Lovely, and Philo McCullough. It was released on February 17, 1919.

== Cast list ==
- Hale Hamilton as Johnny Rutledge
- Louise Lovely as Anne Travers
- Philo McCullough as Arthur Abington, aka Cooley
- Ruth Orlamond as Mrs. Webster
- Edward J. Connelly as Judge Martin Crandall
- Hardee Kirkland as Dr. Barnabas Bunyon
- Lila Leslie as Lillian Dupre (credited as Lilie Leslie)
- E. N. Wallack as Jim Burton
- Fred H. Warren as Pipe Brooks
- Neal Hardin as Buck Bates
- Oral Humphreys as Canary Kelly
