= Five Thousand an Hour =

1918 silent film directed by Ralph Ince

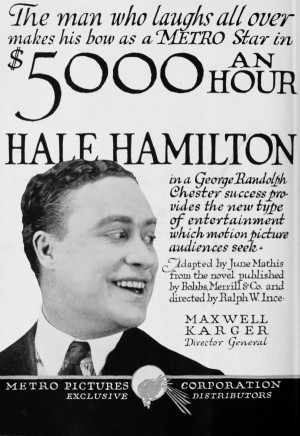
- Directed by: Ralph Ince
- Written by: June Mathis
- Based on: the novel, Five Thousand an Hour by George Randolph Chester
- Produced by: Maxwell Karger
- Starring: Hale Hamilton; Lucille Lee Stewart; Gilbert Douglas
- Cinematography: William J. Black
- Production company: Metro Pictures
- Release date: November 25, 1918 (US)
- Running time: 5 reels
- Country: United States
- Language: English

Five Thousand an Hour is a 1918 American silent comedy-drama film, directed by Ralph Ince. It stars Hale Hamilton, Lucille Lee Stewart, and Gilbert Douglas, and was released on November 25, 1918.

== Plot ==
When Johnny Gamble's partner, Paul Gresham, steals all the corporate funds, Gamble is left to pay off the company shareholders out of his own personal fortune. After he's done with that, he is left with only $100 to his name. Feeling he has nothing left to lose, he heads to the racetrack, where he bets it all on a longshot, which wins the race, returning $15,000 to Gamble. At the track, he meets Constance Joy, and learns that she is slated to marry Gresham in 6 weeks. She is doing this in order to be eligible to inherit a million dollars on her 26th birthday, in 6 weeks time.

Gamble sets out to turn his $15,000 into a million dollars in six weeks, so that he can marry Constance instead of her marrying Gresham. He engages in a series of business ventures, all of which turn out quite well for him, despite interference from Gresham. With fifteen minutes to go before the deadline, Gamble is still $15,000 short. However, Constance offers him the $15,000 for a single kiss.

== Cast list ==
- Hale Hamilton as Johnny Gamble
- Lucille Lee Stewart as Constance Joy
- Gilbert Douglas as Paul Gresham
- Florence Short as Polly Parsons
- Robert Whittier as Jim Collaton
- Robert Middlemass as Ashley Loring
- Isabel O'Madigan as Mrs. Patty Boyden
- William Frederic as Colonel Bouncer
- Warren Cook as Raymond Courtney
- Charles Edwards as Boise
- Hardee Kirkland as Mortimer Washer
- Jack Bulger as Birchard
- William Cohill

== Production ==
In August 1918 it was announced that Metro Pictures had acquired the rights to George Chester Randolph's novel, Five Thousand an Hour. The script was written by June Mathis, with Ralph Ince at the helm and starring Hale Hamilton. Some of the racetrack scenes were filmed on location at Saratoga Racetrack. The film marked Hamilton's debut as a starring actor for Metro Pictures. In August 1918 Metro announced that the supporting cast around Hamilton would be Lucille Lee Stewart, Robert Middlemas, Florence Short, Robert Whittier, Warren Cook, William Fredericks, Gilbert Douglas and Jack Bulger. The picture was originally scheduled to be released October 21. Douglas was a well-known Broadway actor, and the film was the first time he appeared on-screen. Filming on the picture finished in mid-September. The film's release was delayed, finally occurring on November 25, 1918. As of October 2019, the film was listed on the National Film Preservation Board's list of Lost U.S. Silent Feature Films.

== Reception ==
The La Crosse Tribune enjoyed the film, as well as the performance of Hamilton, "The story is of unusual vigor and strength and presents Mr. Hamilton in the dynamic leading role which is one eminently suited to his virile and compelling style of comedy, and as Johnny Gamble, he is seen at his best." The Los Angeles Evening Express also gave the film a good review calling it, "one of the most entertaining comedy dramas ever seen on the screen." Motion Picture News, on the other hand, did not like the picture, calling it "slow and tiring".
