= The Broken Wing (1932 film) =

1932 film

- Theatrical release poster
- Directed by: Lloyd Corrigan
- Screenplay by: Grover Jones; William Slavens McNutt
- Based on: The Broken Wing 1920 play by Paul Dickey and Charles W. Goddard
- Starring: Lupe Vélez; Leo Carrillo; Melvyn Douglas; George Barbier; Willard Robertson; Claire Dodd; Arthur Stone
- Cinematography: Henry Sharp
- Music by: Rudolph G. Kopp; John Leipold
- Production company: Paramount Publix Corp.
- Distributed by: Paramount Pictures
- Release date: March 21, 1932
- Running time: 71 minutes
- Country: United States
- Language: English

The Broken Wing is a 1932 American pre-Code drama film directed by Lloyd Corrigan and written by Grover Jones and William Slavens McNutt, adapted from the play of the same name by Paul Dickey and Charles W. Goddard. The film stars Lupe Vélez, Leo Carrillo, Melvyn Douglas, George Barbier, Willard Robertson, Claire Dodd and Arthur Stone. The Broken Wing was released on March 21, 1932, by Paramount Pictures.

== Plot ==
In a small Mexican town, Captain Innocencio pursues the beautiful Lolita. Innocencio rules the town with an iron hand. Although he calls Lolita his "big love," her fortune teller assures her that another "king of hearts" awaits her, and will come in a storm. When pilot Philip "Phil" Marvin, during a storm, is forced to land in Lolita's garden, she is sure he is her true love. Suffering from amnesia, Philip falls in love with her. Seeing the initials on his underwear, Lolita calls him "BVD."

when he sees him kissing Lolita, in a jealous rage, Innocencio arrests the pilot and even threatens to kill him. Lolita's American guardian, Luther Farley, an old friend of Innocencio, threatens to call in government troops. Moments before the pilot's execution, an American engineer, Sylvester Cross, recognizes the pilot as Philip Marvin, a prominent resident of Los Angeles.

Although it breaks Lolita's heart, to save Philip's life, Cross tells him he is married and produces his own wife claiming she is his wife. Philip, who for days, has been listening to the song of a whippoorwill suddenly recalls the opening bars of "Over There" and his time as a fighter pilot in the war. With his memory back, he assures Lolita he is not married. Enraged, Innocencio draws his revolver on Philip but government troops arrive to arrest him.

Lolita and Philip leave in an aircraft, but Innocencio escapes from prison, shouting that danger is more fun than love.

== Cast ==
- Lupe Vélez as Lolita
- Leo Carrillo as Capt. Innocencio
- Melvyn Douglas as Philip "Phil" Marvin
- George Barbier as Luther Farley
- Willard Robertson as Sylvester Cross
- Claire Dodd as Cecelia Cross
- Arthur Stone as Justin Bailey
- Soledad Jiménez as Maria
- Julian Rivero as Bassilio
- Pietro Sosso as Pancho
- Chris-Pin Martin as Mexican Husband
- Charles Stevens as Chicken Thief
- Joe Dominguez as Captain

== Production ==
Principal photography on The Broken Wing was completed in mid-March 1932. While in production, the exterior sets were damaged in a rain storm, and the film reverted to interiors. The film was based on the earlier The Broken Wing, a silent film comedy-drama based on the original stage play, The Broken Wing (1920) by Paul Dickey and Charles W. Goddard.

== Reception ==
The Broken Wing was critically reviewed by Mordaunt Hall in The New York Times. He praised the film with the comment: "Leo Carrillo gives an ingratiating portrayal as a good-natured Mexican killer in the pictorial version of the play, 'The Broken Wing,' which is the chief attraction at the Paramount. It may not be a new story, but it makes a highly amusing entertainment and it is splendidly staged and efficiently acted by the supporting cast, which includes the vivacious Lupe Velez."

In July 1932, The Broken Wing was banned in Mexico City by the Federal District Government on the charge that the film "... slurred Mexico," and, subsequently, was also banned in Panama. While the film was being screened in Panama City, the film was abruptly stopped when a request was received from the Mexican Minister. (Note: Lupe Velez was also banned in Mexico because of her participation in the film.)
