= Grace La Rue =

American actress, singer, and vaudeville headliner (1882–1956)

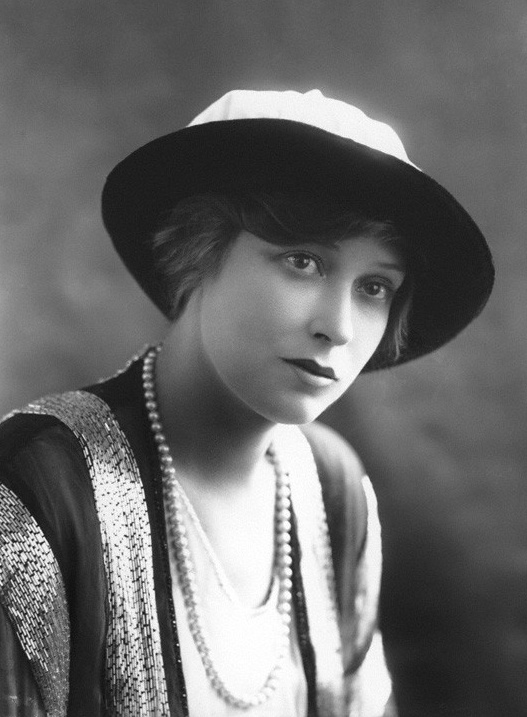
- La Rue in 1913
- Born: Stella Parsons; April 23, 1882; Kansas City, Missouri, U.S.
- Died: March 13, 1956 (aged 73); San Francisco, California, U.S.
- Occupation: Actress
- Years active: 1906–1940
- Spouses: William T. Gray (1897 - 19??); 2 daughters; Charles Burke (divorced); Byron Chandler (m. 1909; div. 1914) Hale Hamilton (m. 1920; died 1942)

Grace La Rue (born Stella Parsons; April 23, 1882 – March 13, 1956) was an American actress, singer, and vaudeville headliner.

== Career ==
La Rue began her career as a teenager, working with a traveling tent show. In the meantime, she married a William T. Gray by whom she had two daughters while still in her teens. Her later performances included being part of the team Burke and La Rue, with her second husband, Charles Burke. One of their numbers was a minstrel piece titled "Grace La Rue and her Inky Dinks". She soon broke away from the act - and Burke - to appear in musical comedy.

La Rue performed in a number of productions on Broadway debuting in The Tourists in 1906. She also appeared in The Blue Moon (1906), Molly May (1910), Betsy (1911), and the 1907 and 1908 Ziegfeld Follies. In 1909, she married Byron Chandler in Bennington, Vermont. The marriage broke up in 1914 when La Rue divorced, alleging that Chandler was unfaithful and that he beat her.

La Rue made her debut as a Vaudeville single act in November 1912 at Poli's in Springfield, Missouri. As part of the act she sang an aria from Madame Butterfly, and a duet with a phonograph recording of Enrico Caruso. Variety gave her a good review commenting that the act gave La Rue the "opportunity to display her Parisian cultivated voice."

La Rue made her debut at the Palace Theatre on August 4, 1913. Her act featured the song "You Made Me Love You (I Didn't Want to Do It)", from the show Honeymoon Express, a musical she had appeared in with Al Jolson. Later that year, she brought her Vaudeville act to Britain, appearing at the London Palace on August 4, 1913, where she made gramophone recordings of hit songs from her act.

In 1919, La Rue made her screen debut opposite American stage and film actor Hale Hamilton in the melodrama That's Good. She married Hamilton on May 29, 1920, amid a whirl of controversy surrounding a lawsuit filed by Hamilton's second wife, actress Myrtle Tannehill.

In 1922-1923, La Rue appeared in Irving Berlin's second Music Box Revue at the Music Box Theatre in New York. In 1924, she appeared at the Coliseum in London with Hamilton. For the rest of the decade she worked mainly in the United States alternating between Vaudeville and in musical comedies and revues. One of her last big time appearances was in the 1928 Greenwich Village Follies at the Winter Garden Theatre in New York. She appeared in a 1929 Vitaphone short called Grace La Rue: The International Star of Song. By the early 1930s, she had retired to California, where she made a brief appearance in the 1933 Mae West film She Done Him Wrong.

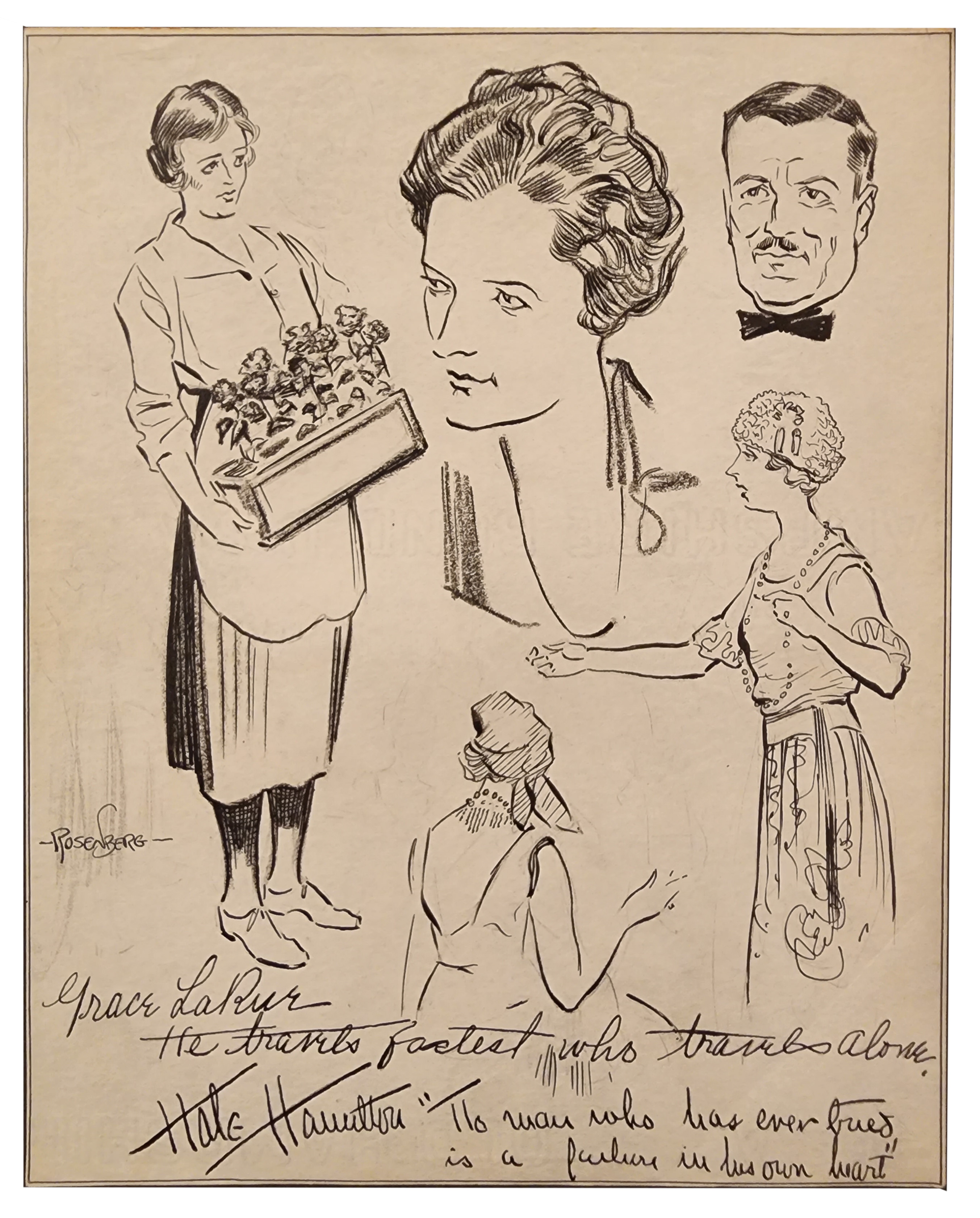
Signed drawing by Manuel Rosenberg 1919

Grace La Rue died at Peninsula Hospital in Burlingame, California on March 13, 1956.
