= Inez Plummer =

American actress

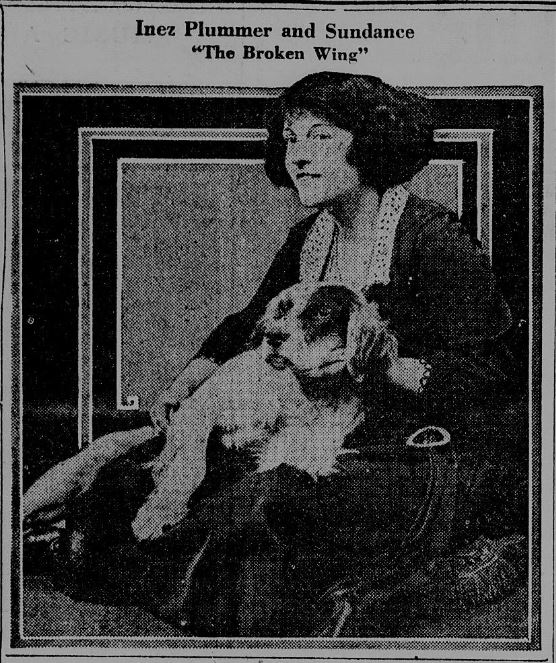
American Actress Inez Plummer

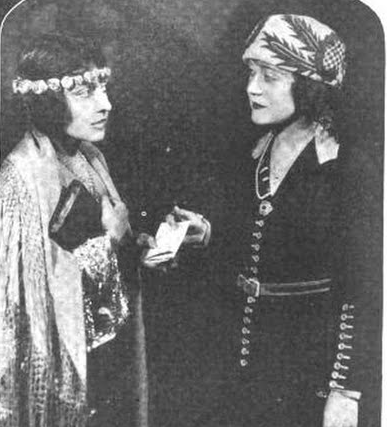
Inez Plummer and Myrtle Tannehill in a scene from The Broken Wing (1921).

Inez Plummer (between 1884 and 1887 – October 1964) was a Syracuse, New York native and a leading lady of the Burbank, California stock company, in the second decade of the 20th century. Plummer's father managed a theater for thirty-five years. He disapproved of his daughter becoming an actress. Plummer rehearsed her first role in her father's theater with a stock company, without his knowledge. After finding out he was shocked but decided to let her continue.

== Los Angeles theatre star ==
She played her first stage role when she was two years old. Until mid 1906, she was content acting in ingenue roles, until beginning her professional acting career. This began on August 29, 1906 as a performer in The Price of Money, and endured until March 1929. Her final show was The Octoroon, in which she played the character of Zoe.

In November 1916 she appeared at the Alhambra Theater in a production of The High Cost of Living. She became the leading woman of the Belasco Theatre in Los Angeles, California. There she starred in The Fortune Hunter in the fall of 1916.

From 1920 to 1921, she and Charles Trowbridge starred in The Broken Wing, a play written by Paul Dickey.
