= That's Good =

1919 silent American film directed by Harry L. Franklin

- Directed by: Harry L. Franklin
- Written by: A. G. Kenyon
- Based on: the short story, "That's Good" by Richard Washburn Child
- Produced by: Maxwell Karger
- Starring: Hale Hamilton; Stella Gray; Herbert Prior
- Cinematography: Arthur Martinelli
- Production company: Metro Pictures
- Release date: March 24, 1919 (US)
- Running time: 5 reels
- Country: United States
- Language: English

That's Good is a lost 1919 American silent comedy film directed by Harry L. Franklin and starring Hale Hamilton, Stella Gray, and Herbert Prior. It was released on March 19, 1919.

== Cast list ==
- Hale Hamilton as Marcellus Starr
- Stella Gray as Josephine Pollock
- Herbert Prior as Barrett Prentice
- James Duffy as Ed Freeze
- Lewis Morrison as Ben Goetting
- Marjorie Yeager as Alice
- James McAndless as Jim the store clerk

== Preservation ==
With no holdings located in archives, That's Good is considered a lost film.
