= Jane Oaker =

American actress (1876–1960)

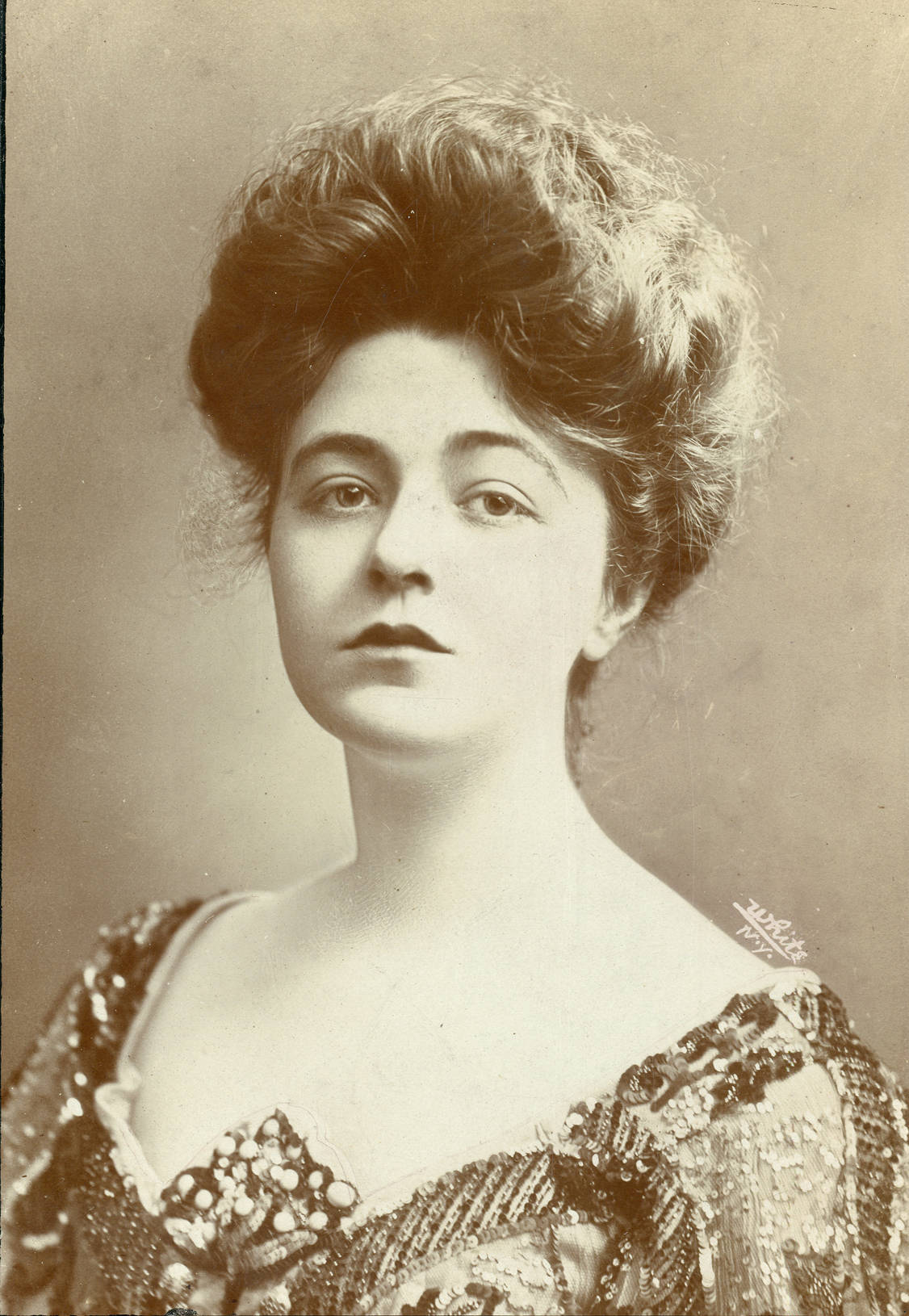
- Oaker in 1907
- Born: Wilhelmina Dorothy Peper; June 17, 1878; St. Louis, Missouri, U.S.
- Died: January 15, 1960 (aged 81); St. Louis, Missouri, U.S.
- Occupation: Actress
- Spouse: Hale Hamilton (m. 1901; div. 1912)

Wilhelmina "Minnie" Dorothy Peper (June 17, 1878 – January 15, 1960), known professionally as Jane Oaker, was an American theatre actress.

== Early life ==
Wilhelmina Dorothy Peper was born in St. Louis, Missouri, the daughter of Christian C. Peper, a wealthy tobacco manufacturer. Peper attended Vassar College, and the New York School of Dramatic Art.

"I am ready to assert most positively and from personal observation that a big bank account is of the greatest importance in pushing a girl forward in a dramatic career," she wrote of her wealthy background, adding "a trunkful of imported toggery will give the rich girl an opportunity to appear in one of those coveted roles that calls for no more talent than a series of handsome gowns."

== Career ==
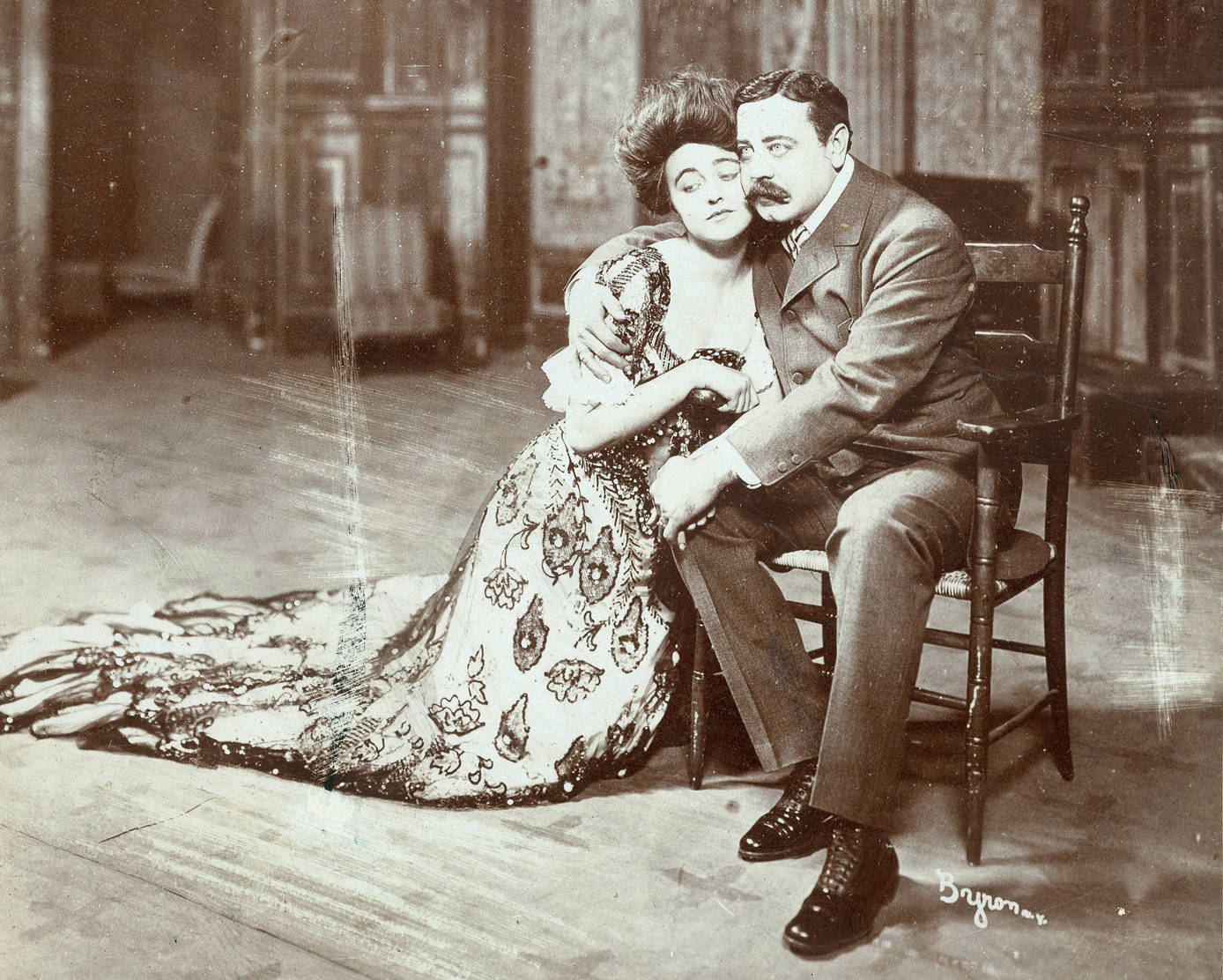
Oaker co-starred with Wilton Lackaye in The Pit, 1904

Oaker started on the stage in the 1900, as Hermia in A Midsummer Night's Dream. In 1903 she headed the Jane Oaker Stock Company. Broadway appearances by Oaker included roles in The Pit (1904), The Pillars of Society (1904), The Silver Girl (1907), Love Among the Lions (1910), The Importance of Being Earnest (1910), Cousin Lucy (1915), Lightnin' (1918–1921), and Los Angeles (1927–1928). On the London stage, she was seen in The Butter and Egg Man (1927). She starred in Clyde Fitch's comedy Girls on tour in 1908.

In 1907 the New York Times reported that Oaker saved a five-year-old child in the path of an oncoming car on Broadway. In 1924 she was hurt as a passenger in an automobile accident in San Francisco.

== Personal life ==
Oaker married actor Hale Hamilton in 1901. They divorced in 1912, just before Hamilton married another actress, Myrtle Tannehill.

Oaker died in St. Louis in 1960, and was buried in the city's Bellefontaine Cemetery.
