= Full of Pep =

1919 silent film directed by Harry L. Franklin

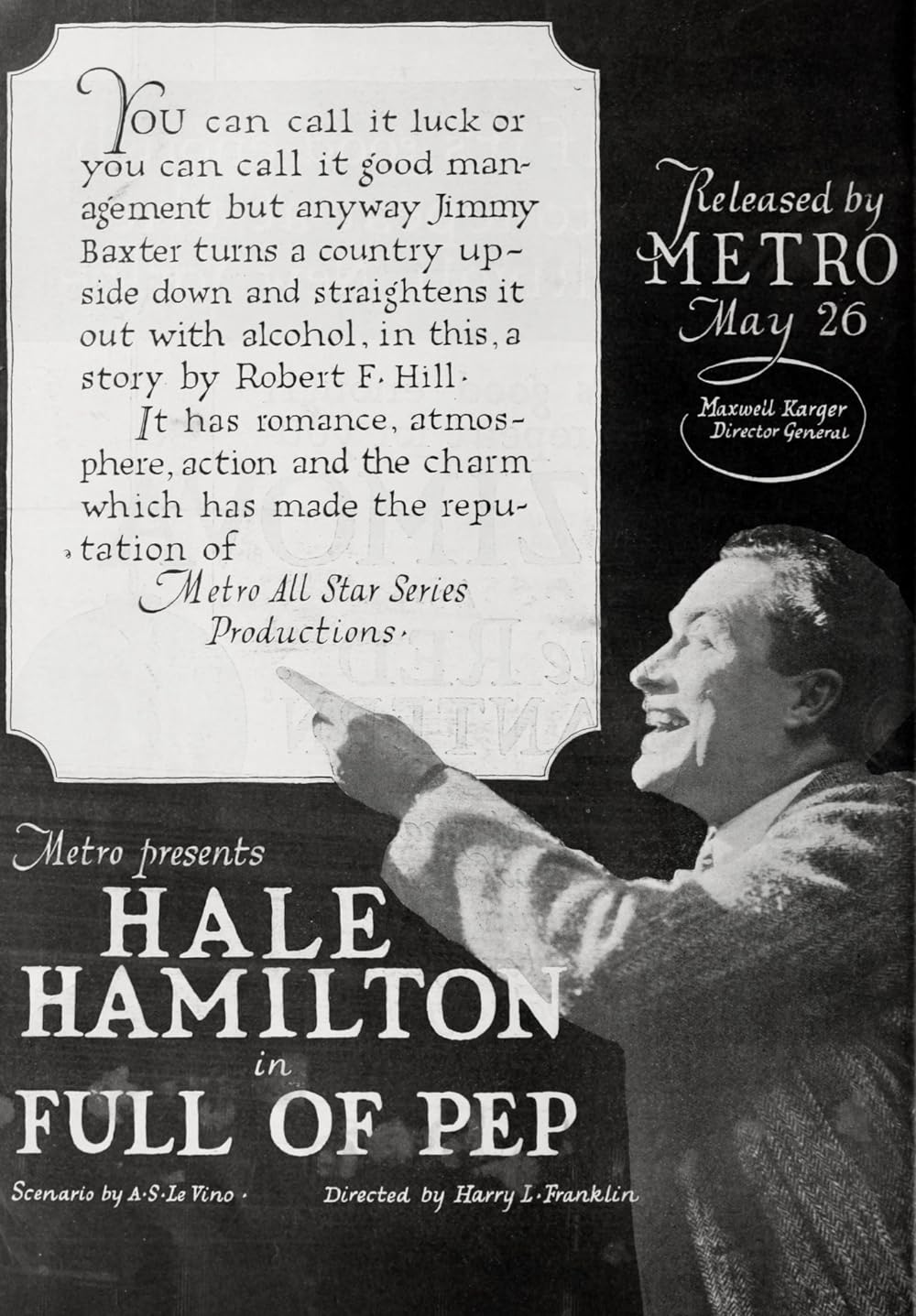
- Advertisement for the film
- Directed by: Harry L. Franklin
- Screenplay by: A. S. Le Vino (scenario)
- Story by: Robert Hill
- Produced by: Maxwell Karger
- Starring: Hale Hamilton; Alice Lake; Alice Knowland
- Cinematography: Rudolph J. Bergquist
- Production company: Metro Pictures
- Release date: May 26, 1919 (US)
- Running time: 5 reels
- Country: United States
- Language: English

Full of Pep is a 1919 American silent comedy film, directed by Harry L. Franklin. It stars Hale Hamilton, Alice Lake, and Alice Knowland, and was released on May 26, 1919.

== Plot ==
Jimmy Baxter is a salesman for his father's munitions company. When he returns home from a trip, he notices a pretty woman, who also notices him. Before he can speak with her, her train leaves. All he knows about her is where she was travelling to, and her initials, "FB", which he saw on her luggage.

Returning to the office, his father asks him to deliver a package of munitions to the Central American country of Santo Dinero. This was the destination of Jimmy's mystery girl. The package has to be delivered secretly, in order to thwart attempts by insurgents to hijack the shipment. Jimmy gladly accepts the mission, and creates the persona of travelling medicine salesman, selling "Pep". Pep is not a medicine, but is in reality a type of whiskey. This would be a big deal in Santo Dinero, where alcohol is prohibited.

Arriving in the southern country, Jimmy discovers that his mystery girl is Felicia Bocaz, the daughter of the country's president. However, he also finds out that her main suitor is General Lopanzo, head of the country's army. Secretly, the general is actually the leader of the insurgents. However, through the sale of Pep, Jimmy wins over the populace, and the military, when he gives away of Pep. He also wins the girl.

== Cast list ==
- Hale Hamilton as Jimmy Baxter
- Alice Lake as Felicia Bocaz
- Alice Knowland as the duenna
- Fred Malatesta as General Lopanzo
- Charles Hill Mailes as Escamillo Gomez
- Victor Potel as Beanpole
- R. D. MacLean as President Bocaz

== Production ==
In the April 12, 1919 edition of Motion Picture News, it was announced that Maxwell Karger, the general manager for Metro Pictures had purchased the rights to an original story by Robert F. Hill, entitled Full of Pep, with the intent to use it as a starring vehicle for Hale Hamilton. Later that same month Alice Lake was added to the cast.

== Reception ==
The Washington Times gave the film a good review, saying "It is entirely novel in its development, dazzling in its swiftness of action, and poignant in its heart appeal." The Tampa Sunday Tribune also gave the picture a positive review, calling it a "clever Metro melodramatic-comedy in which he [Hale] is seen at his best.
