= Her Painted Hero =

- Directed by: F. Richard Jones
- Written by: Mack Sennett
- Starring: Hale Hamilton, Charles Murray, Harold Lloyd
- Release date: 1915
- Country: United States

Her Painted Hero is a 1915 American short comedy film directed by F. Richard Jones and written by Mack Sennett. Harold Lloyd appears in the film, uncredited.

== Premise ==
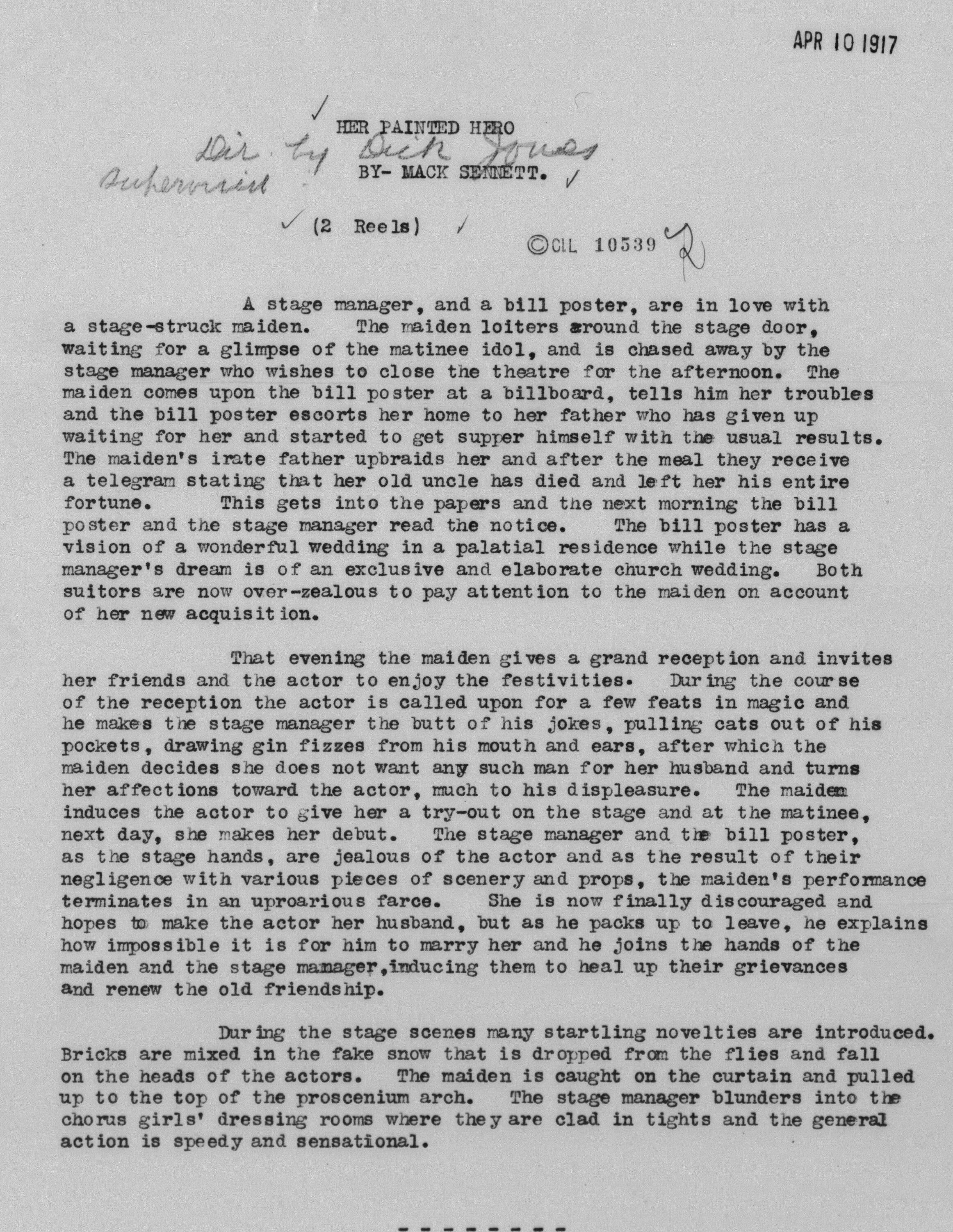
Plot summary for the film, serving as copyright registration in the USA.

An heiress plans to use her new wealth for influence on the stage. The play being shown within the film is titled What Sherman Said, and is seemingly an epic about the Civil War.

== Cast ==
- Hale Hamilton as a Matinee Idol
- Charles Murray as a Property Man
- Slim Summerville as a Bill-Poster
- Polly Moran as a Stage-struck Maiden
- Harry Booker as the Maiden's Father
- Harold Lloyd as a minister (uncredited)

== Production ==
The film was written by Mack Sennett for his Keystone Studios. Also credited as the Keystone Film Company the logo clearly visible within the film is for the amalgamated company "Keystone Triangle", later to be abbreviated to Tri-stone Pictures. In 2007, when the independent film studio Cineville merged with the DVD distributor Westlake Entertainment, the companies named their joint enterprise Keystone.

== Release ==
The film was distributed in France as Vermicel artiste peintre.

== Status ==
Prints of the film exist.

== Home video ==
Her Painted Hero was included on various DVDs gathering silent comedies.

The film is part of the 50 movie pack Comedy Classics DVD collection, released in 2007.Universal comedy classics series.

== Reception ==
The New York Times sees in this short film an "example of a curious movie phenomena". The film's technical particularities were also noted in a review for The Moving Picture World, January 1916.
