= The Winning of Beatrice =

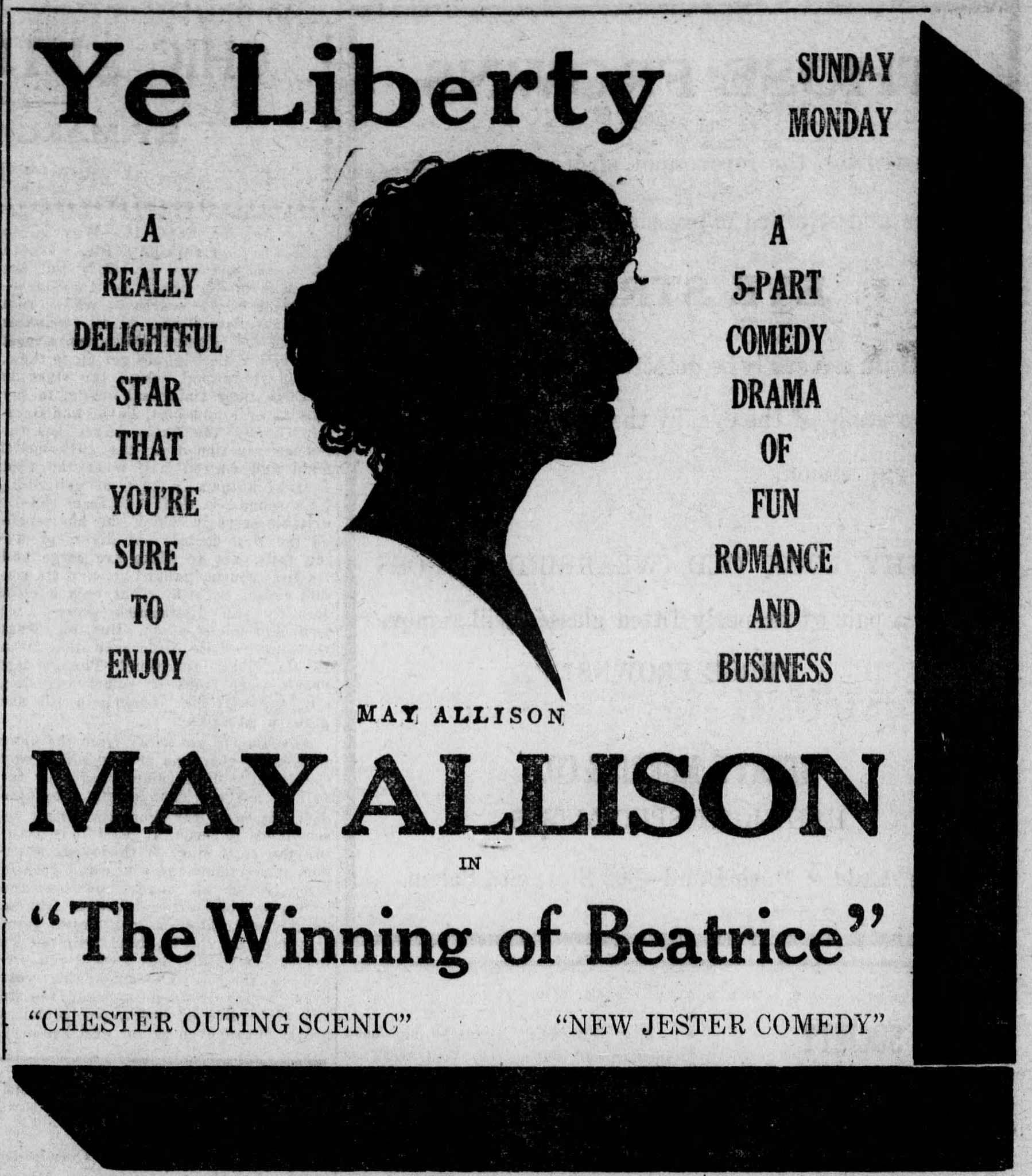
- Newspaper advertisement
- Directed by: Harry L. Franklin
- Written by: June Mathis (scenario); Katherine Kavanaugh (scenario); May Tully (story)
- Produced by: Maxwell Karger
- Starring: May Allison; Hale Hamilton
- Cinematography: Arthur Martinelli
- Distributed by: Metro Pictures
- Release date: May 20, 1918
- Running time: 5 reels
- Country: USA
- Language: Silent..English intertitles

The Winning of Beatrice is a lost 1918 silent film romantic comedy directed by Harry L. Franklin and starring May Allison and Hale Hamilton.

== Cast ==
- May Allison - Beatrice Buckley
- Hale Hamilton - Robert Howard
- Frank Currier - James Buckley
- Stephen Grattan - John Maddox Sr.
- John Davidson - John Maddox, R.
- Peggy Parr - Millie Nelson
- Dean Raymond - Thomas Nelson
- Frank Joyner - Henry Jenkins
- Ivy Ward - Baby Jenkins
