= Hale Hamilton =

American actor (1880–1942)

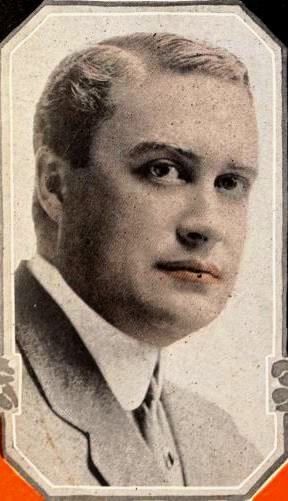
- Born: Hale Rice Hamilton; February 28, 1880; Fort Madison, Iowa, U.S.
- Died: May 19, 1942 (aged 62); Hollywood, California, U.S.
- Occupation: Actor
- Years active: 1901–1940
- Spouse(s): Jane Oaker (m.1901–div.1912); Myrtle Tannehill (m.1912–div.1920); Grace La Rue (m.1920)

Hale Rice Hamilton (February 28, 1880 – May 19, 1942) was an American actor.

== Biography ==
Hamilton was born in Fort Madison, Iowa in 1880. (His birth year is sometimes listed as either 1879 or 1880.) His brother was politician John Daniel Miller Hamilton.

Hamilton's Broadway debut was in Don Caesar's Return (1901).

He was married to three actresses, Jane Oaker, Myrtle Tannehill, and Grace La Rue. Tannehill sued Hamilton, accusing him of being lured away from her by La Rue.

He filed bankruptcy in 1937.

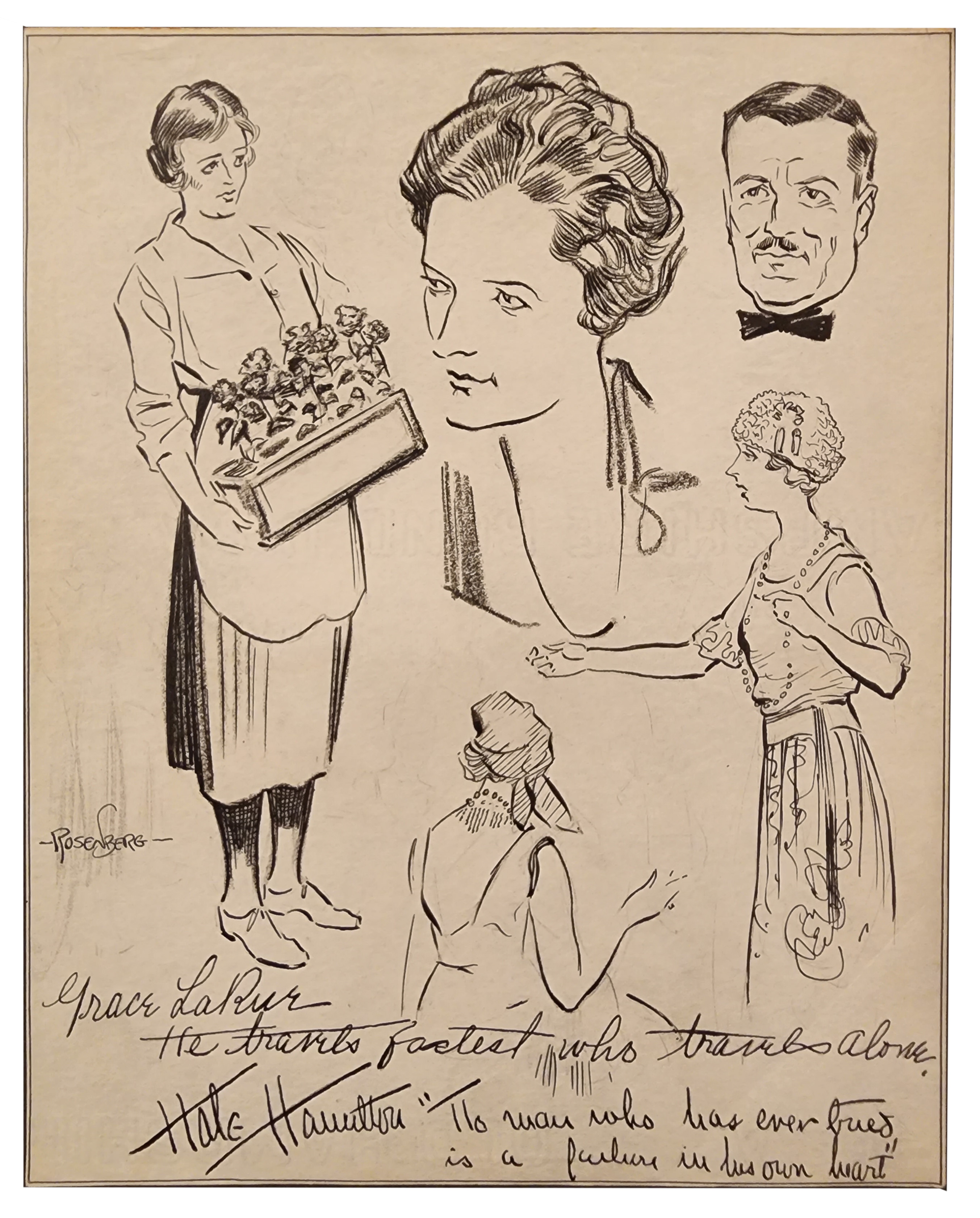
Signed drawing by Manuel Rosenberg 1919

== Selected filmography ==
- Her Painted Hero (1915, Short) - A Matinee Idol
- The Winning of Beatrice (1918) - Robert Howard
- Opportunity (1918) - Anthony Fry
- Five Thousand an Hour (1918) - Johnny Gamble
- The Return of Mary (1918, Writer)
- Johnny-on-the-Spot (1919) - Johnny Rutledge
- That's Good (1919) (with Grace La Rue) - Marcellus Starr
- After His Own Heart (1919) - Thomas Wentworth Duncan
- Full of Pep (1919) - Jimmy Baxter
- In His Brother's Place (1919) - Nelson Drake / J. Barrington Drake
- The Four-Flusher (1919) - Lon Withers
- His Children's Children (1923) - Rufus Kayne
- The Manicure Girl (1925) - James Morgan
- The Greater Glory (1926) - Leon Krum
- The Great Gatsby (1926) - Tom Buchanan
- Tin Gods (1926) - Dr. McCoy
- Summer Bachelors (1926) - Beverly Greenway
- Girl in the Rain (1927)
- The Telephone Girl (1927) - Mark
- Good Intentions (1930) - Franklin Graham
- Common Clay (1930) - Judge Samuel Filson
- Paid (1930) - District Attorney Demarest
- Beau Ideal (1931) - Maj. LeBaudy
- Dance, Fools, Dance (1931) - Mr. Selby
- The Drums of Jeopardy (1931) - Martin Kent
- A Tailor Made Man (1931) - Mr. Stanlaw
- Strangers May Kiss (1931) - Andrew
- Never the Twain Shall Meet (1931) - Mark Mellenger
- The Great Lover (1931) - Stapleton
- Rebound (1931) - Lyman Patterson
- Murder at Midnight (1931) - Phillip Montrose
- New Adventures of Get Rich Quick Wallingford (1931) - Charles Harper
- Susan Lenox (Her Fall and Rise) (1931) - Mike Kelly
- The Champ (1931) - Tony Carleton
- The Cuban Love Song (1931) - John
- A Fool's Advice (1932) - George Diamond
- Love Affair (1932) - Bruce Hardy
- Two Against the World (1932) - Mr. Gordon Mitchell
- Life Begins (1932) - Dr. Cramm
- Those We Love (1932) - Blake
- The Most Dangerous Game (1932) - Bill - Owner of Yacht (uncredited)
- A Successful Calamity (1932) - John Belde -\sWilton's Business Associate
- Three on a Match (1932) - Defense Attorney
- I Am a Fugitive from a Chain Gang (1932) - Rev. Robert Allen
- Call Her Savage (1932) - Cyrus Randall (uncredited)
- Manhattan Tower (1932) - David Witman
- The Billion Dollar Scandal (1933) - Jackson
- Employees' Entrance (1933) - Monroe
- Reform Girl (1933) - Santor Putnam
- Parole Girl (1933) - Anthony 'Tony' Grattan
- Black Beauty (1933) - Harlan Bledsoe
- Strange People (1933) - J.E.Burton - the Attorney
- One Man's Journey (1933) - Dr. Tillinghast
- The Wolf Dog (1933, Serial) - Norman Bryan
- Curtain at Eight (1933) - Major Manning
- Sitting Pretty (1933) - Vinton (uncredited)
- Twin Husbands (1933) - Colonel Gordon Lewis
- The Quitter (1934) - Maj. Stephen Winthrop
- City Park (1934) - Herbert Ransome
- Private Scandal (1934) - Jim Orrington (uncredited)
- Dr. Monica (1934) - Dr. Brent
- The Girl from Missouri (1934) - Charlie Turner
- Big Hearted Herbert (1934) - Mr. Havens
- When Strangers Meet (1934) - Captain Manning
- The Marines Are Coming (1934) - Colonel Gilroy
- Grand Old Girl (1935) - Killaine
- After Office Hours (1935) - Henry King Patterson
- The Woman in Red (1935) - Wyatt Furness
- Hold 'Em Yale (1935) - Mr. Wilmot
- Let 'Em Have It (1935) - Ex-Senator Reilly
- The Nitwits (1935) - Winfield Lake
- Calm Yourself (1935) - Mr. M.B. Kent
- Dante's Inferno (1935) - Mr. Wallace (uncredited)
- I Live My Life (1935) - Uncle Carl
- Three Kids and a Queen (1935) - Ralph
- The Adventures of Marco Polo (1938) - Maffeo Polo (uncredited)
- Edison, the Man (1940) - Broker (uncredited) (final film role)
