= Jere F. Looney =

American writer in the silent era

Jere F. Looney was a writer for several American silent films.

== Background ==
He was a native of Shreveport, Louisiana.

== Career ==
Looney is best known for writing screenplays for a series of Alice Joyce films. He is also known for writing Milly of Millions, a melodrama-comedy in 3 acts. In 1912, he was one of four scenario writers to win a Universal Film Manufacturing Company contest. However, he has also received negative criticism in the past as well. In 1917, a reviewer gave an unfavorable accounting of The Brand of Satan's storyline.

== Filmography ==
- The House of Darkness (1913)
- The Brand (1914)
- The Rainbow Girl (1917)
- The Brand of Satan (1917)
