= Maxwell Karger =

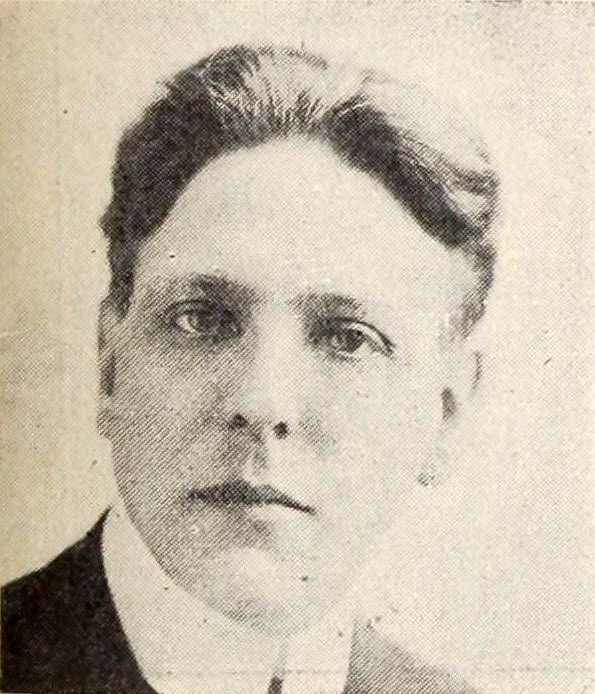
- Born: January 17, 1879; Cincinnati, Ohio US
- Died: May 5, 1922 (aged 43); On a train between New York and Fort Wayne, Indiana
- Resting place: Hollywood Forever Cemetery, Los Angeles California
- Occupations: Film producer and director
- Years active: ?–1922
- Spouse: Anne Florence (née Conley) Karger
- Children: 1

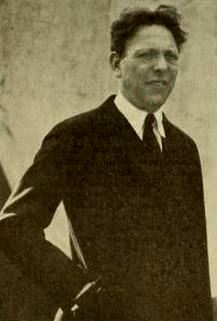
Motion Picture World, 1919

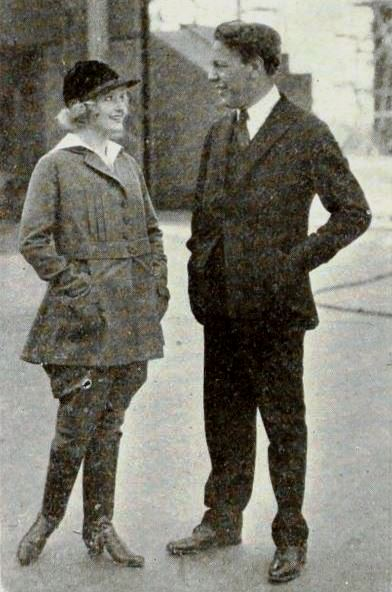
Karger with actress May Allison, 1919

Maxwell Karger (1879–1922) was an important movie producer and motion picture director during the silent film era of the 1910s.

== Biography ==
Karger's approach to making pictures was similar to that of contemporary Thomas H. Ince. Both died relatively young, but where Ince is remembered for his streamlined productions and circumstances surrounding his death, Karger is relatively forgotten today. Karger was a founder of Rolfe Photoplays in New York but later worked primarily at the Metro Pictures studios and was later a personal assistant to Rudolph Valentino.

Karger died of heart disease while on a train between New York and Fort Wayne, Indiana. His son Fred Karger (1916–1979) was a voice coach at Columbia Pictures and the fourth and final husband of actress Jane Wyman after her marriage to Ronald Reagan ended.

== Selected filmography ==
As director

- Hate (1922)
- Kisses (1922)
- The Golden Gift (1922)
- The Idle Rich (1921)
- The Hole in the Wall (1921)
- A Trip to Paradise (1921)
- The Man Who (1921)
- A Message from Mars (1921)
- The Golden Gift (1922)

As producer

- Romeo and Juliet (1916)
- Outwitted (1917)
- The Adopted Son (1917)
- Red, White and Blue Blood (1917)
- Social Hypocrites (1918)
- Pay Day (1918)
- The Winning of Beatrice (1918)
- A Successful Adventure (1918)
- Flower of the Dusk (1918)
- Secret Strings (1918)
- Sylvia on a Spree (1918)
- The Shell Game (1918)
- With Neatness and Dispatch (1918)
- Social Quicksands (1918)
- The House of Gold (1918)
- A Man's World (1918)
- Opportunity (1918)
- A Pair of Cupids (1918)
- The Silent Woman (1918)
- His Bonded Wife (1918)
- Five Thousand an Hour (1918)
- The Gold Cure (1919)
- Johnny-on-the-Spot (1919)
- Peggy Does Her Darndest (1919)
- The Great Victory (1919)
- That's Good (1919)
- The Amateur Adventuress (1919)
- The Island of Intrigue (1919)
- The Brat (1919)
- Satan Junior (1919)
- Please Get Married (1919)
- Blind Man's Eyes (1919)
- The Way of the Strong (1919)
- The Parisian Tigress (1919)
- Blackie's Redemption (1919)
- Full of Pep (1919)
- One-Thing-at-a-Time O'Day (1919)
- The Uplifters (1919)
- The Microbe (1919)
- Stronger Than Death (1920)
- The Willow Tree (1920)
- The Walk-Offs (1920)
- The Right of Way (1920)
- Alias Jimmy Valentine (1920)
- Dangerous to Men (1920)
- The Hope (1920)
- Love, Honor and Obey (1920)
- Clothes (1920)
- The Fatal Hour (1920)
- The Misleading Lady (1920)
- Puppets of Fate (1921)
- Fine Feathers (1921)
- The Hole in the Wall (1921)
