= Myrtle Tannehill =

American actress

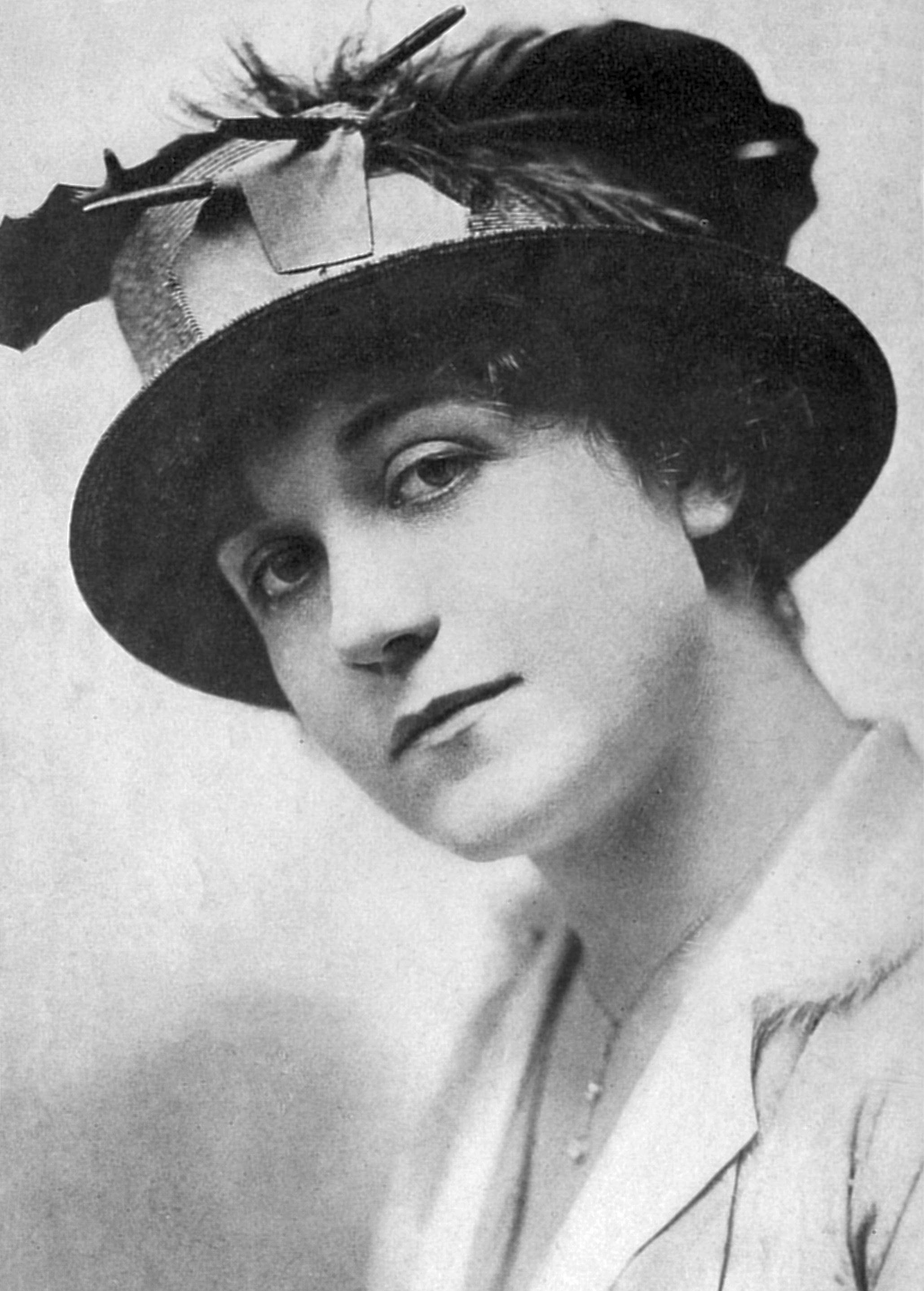
- Myrtle Tannehill, from a 1916 publication
- Born: Myrtle Tannehill; May 18, 1886
- Died: July 25, 1977 (aged 91); Yorktown Heights, New York, U.S.
- Occupation: Actress
- Years active: 1905–1925, 1929–1951
- Spouse(s): Hale Hamilton (m.1912–div.1920); Charles G. Nichols (m.1925)

Myrtle Tannehill Nichols (May 18, 1886 – July 25, 1977) was an American actress on stage and in silent films.

== Early life ==
Myrtle Tannehill was born into a theatrical family. Her mother was actress Maude Giroux, and her father was actor and playwright Frank Tannehill Jr. Her grandparents, Frank Tannehill Sr. and Susan (Nellie) McMurray Tannehill, were also in the theatre. Her much younger half-sister, Frances Tannehill Clark, also became an actress.

== Career ==
Myrtle Tannehill's appearances on Broadway were mostly in comedies, and included roles in the plays Just out of College (1905), Mrs. Wiggs of the Cabbage Patch (1906), Electricity (1910), Broadway Jones (1912-1913), Get-Rich-Quick Wallingford (1917), Dear Brutus (1918-1919), The Bonehead (1920), The Broken Wing (1920-1921), The Dream Maker (1921-1922), Dodsworth (1934), The Philadelphia Story (1939-1940), and Pygmalion (1945-1946). In London she appeared in Sealed Orders (1913) and The Show Off (1924). In 1916 she and her husband Hale Hamilton toured Australia with their stock company. In 1925 she was cast in Appearances, a play by Garland Anderson.

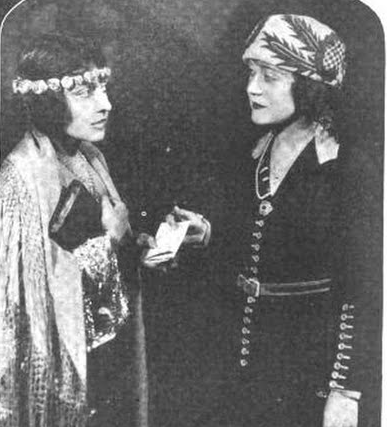
Inez Plummer and Myrtle Tannehill in a scene from The Broken Wing (1921).

Tannehill appeared in three silent films: Ethel's Luncheon (1909), When the Mind Sleeps (1915), and The Barnstormers (1915). She also made two late-career appearances on television, in "Murder by Choice", for Colgate Theatre (1949), and in "Follow Me" for Lights Out (1951).

== Personal life ==
Myrtle Tannehill married actor Hale Hamilton in 1912, a month after he divorced actress Jane Oaker. Tannehill and Hamilton divorced in 1920, before he married his third wife, actress Grace La Rue. Tannehill sued La Rue for alienation of affections. In 1925, Tannehill married stock broker Charles G. Nichols. She retired from the stage after her second marriage, but returned to acting after the stock market crash of 1929. Myrtle Tannehill Nichols died in 1977, aged 91 years.
