= The Heart of Rachael =

1918 American drama film directed by Howard Hickman

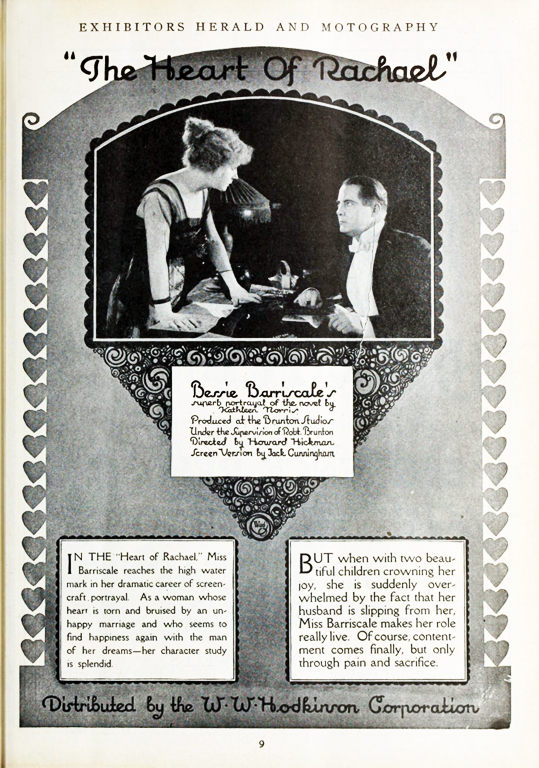
- Magazine ad for movie
- Directed by: Howard Hickman
- Written by: Jack Cunningham scenario Kathleen Norris story
- Produced by: Bessie Barriscale Productions
- Starring: Bessie Barriscale; Ella Hall
- Cinematography: Clyde de Vinna
- Production company: Robert Brunton Studios
- Distributed by: General Film Company
- Release date: October 14, 1918
- Running time: 5 reels
- Country: United States
- Language: Silent (English intertitles)

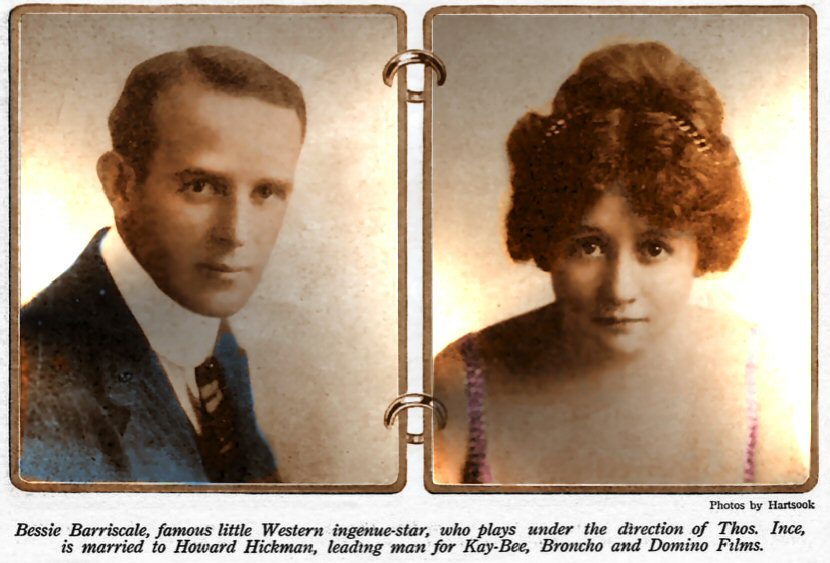

The Heart of Rachael is a 1918 American silent drama film directed by Howard Hickman based on the story by Kathleen Norris with the scenario written by Jack Cunningham. The film stars Bessie Barriscale, Herschel Mayall and Ella Hall.

The film was produced by Bessie Barriscale Productions, distributed by the General Film Company and released in the United States on October 14, 1918.

== Cast ==
- Bessie Barriscale as Rachael
- Herschel Mayall as Clarence Breckenridge
- Ella Hall as Billy
- Herbert Heyes as Dr. Warren Gregory
- Gloria Hope as Magsie Clay
- Ben Alexander as Jim

== Preservation ==
According to the UCLA Film & Television Archive, a complete copy of this film exists.
