= Maie B. Havey =

American screenwriter (1910-1920)

- Born: Marie Judge; September 15, 1889; Manhattan, New York, USA
- Died: June 4, 1971 (aged 81); Manhattan, New York, USA
- Burial place: Gate of Heaven Cemetery
- Other names: Mabelle Harvey; M. B. Havey; May B. Havey; Maie Havey
- Occupations: Actress; Screenwriter
- Years active: 1910–1920
- Partner: Fay Tincher

Maie B. Havey (1889–1971), born Marie Judge, was an American screenwriter active during the earliest years of Hollywood. During her decade in the industry, she is credited with 70 screenplays.

== Biography ==
Maie was born in New York City to Joseph Judge and Mary Kane; her father died when she was young. Her pen name may have come from a stepfather her mother remarried when she was young. In 1913, Maie — who had worked as a magazine writer — was signed as a scenarist for the Lubin Manufacturing Company, and she later worked at Universal and Bessie Barriscale Pictures. She was close friends with actress Fay Tincher, with whom she often worked; the pair even lived together for a time. Little is known of what became of her after 1920, when she wrote her last known scenario for Hollywood.

== Filmography ==
◆ Maie B. Havey scenarios, stories and writings ◆
Year	Title	Age	Credit	Role	Director	Prod	Dist	Released	Genre	Length	Notes	Ref1	Ref2
1910	His Sister-in-Law	21	M.B. Havey	Writer	D.W. Griffith	Biograph	General Film	Dec-15-1910	Drama	Short			
1911	The Diamond Star	21	Maie B. Havey	Writer	D.W. Griffith	Biograph	General Film	Feb-20-1911	Drama	Short			
1911	In the Days of '49	21	Maie B. Havey	Writer	D.W. Griffith	Biograph	General Film	May-8-1911	Drama	Short			
1911	The Smile of a Child	21	M.B. Havey	Writer	D.W. Griffith	Biograph	General Film	Jun-5-1911	Drama	Short			
1911	The Failure	22	M.B. Havey	Writer	D.W. Griffith	Biograph	General Film	Dec-7-1911	Drama	Short			
1912	Blind Love	22	M.B. Havey	Writer	D.W. Griffith	Biograph	General Film	Sep-12-1912	Drama	Short			
1912	At the Masquerade Ball	23	M.B. Havey	Scenario	Harold M. Shaw	Edison	General Film	Oct-22-1912	Drama	Short			
1913	The Running Away of Doris	23	M.B. Havey	Writer	Ashley Miller	Edison	General Film	Jan-13-1913	Drama	Short			
1913	The Supreme Sacrifice	23	M.B. Havey	Story	George Nichols	Lubin	General Film	Feb-27-1913	Drama	Short			
1913	A Birthday Gift	23	Maie B. Havey	Writer	Charles Kent	Vitagraph	General Film	Mar-18-1913	Drama	Short			
1913	For Love of Columbine	23	Maie B. Havey	Story	Oscar Apfel	Reliance	Mutual Film	Apr-12-1913	Drama	Short			
1913	A Mistake in Judgment	23	M.B. Havey	Writer	Charles M. Seay	Edison	General Film	Aug-26-1913	Drama	Short			
1913	Only Five Years Old	24	M.B. Havey	Writer	Lem B. Parker	Selig	General Film	Oct-10-1913	Drama	Short			
1913	Madonna of the Storm	24	M.B. Havey	Writer	D.W. Griffith	Biograph	General Film	Oct-25-1913	Drama	Short			
1913	The Haunted House	24	Maie B. Havey	Story	Lorimer Johnston	American Film	Mutual Film	Nov-8-1913	Drama	Short			
1913	A Man and a Women	24	M.B. Havey	Story	Travers Vale	Reliance	Mutual Film	Nov-19-1913	Drama	Short			
1913	The Capturing of David Dunne	24	M.B. Havey	Story	Unknown	Biograph	General Film	Dec-8-1913	Drama	Short			
1913	For Her Government	24	Maie B. Havey	Scenario	Frank Powell	Biograph	General Film	Dec-22-1913	Drama	Short			
1913	Day Break	24	Maie B. Havey	Writer	Travers Vale	Reliance	Mutual Film	Dec-29-1913	Drama	Short			
1914	In the Gambler's Web	24	Maie B. Havey	Story	Edgar Jones	Lubin	General Film	Mar-4-1914	Drama	Short			
1914	A Pack of Cards	24	Maie B. Havey	Story	Unknown	Lubin	General Film	Apr-30-1914	Drama	Short			
1914	The Attorney's Decision	24	Maie B. Havey	Story	Unknown	Lubin	General Film	Aug-26-1914	Drama	Short			
1914	Through the Dark	24	M.B. Havey	Writer	John G. Adolfi	Reliance	Mutual Film	Aug-29-1914	Drama	Short			
1914	The Weight of a Crown	25	May B. Havey	Story	Harry Myers	Lubin	General Film	Oct-1-1914	Drama	Short			
1915	The Winthrop Diamonds	25	May B. Havey	Story	Edgar Jones	Lubin	General Film	Mar-2-1915	Drama	Short			
1915	A Witch of Salem Town	25	M. B. Havey	Story	L. J. Henderson	Victor	Universal	May-24-1915	Drama	Short			
1915	Souls in Pawn	25	M. B. Havey	Story	Ben F. Wilson	Rex	Universal	Jul-8-1915	Drama	Short			
1915	Her Wonderful Day	25	M. B. Havey	Scenario	Herbert Garber	IMP	Universal	Aug-3-1915	Drama	Short			
1915	The Last Rose	26	Mae B. Havey	Writer	Arthur V. Johnson	Lubin	General Film	Sep-29-1915	Drama	Short			
1915	The Unnecessary Sex	26	M.B. Havey	Story	Jack Harvey	IMP	Universal	Oct-5-1915	Comedy	Short			
1915	The Man of Shame	26	M.B. Havey	Scenario	Harry Myers	Universal	Universal	Oct-11-1915	Drama	Feature			
1915	The Little Lady Across the Way	26	M.B. Havey	Story	Matt Moore	IMP	Universal	Dec-10-1915	Comedy	Short			
1915	Juror Number Seven	26	M. B. Havey	Scenario	Ben F. Wilson	Rex	Universal	Dec-13-1915	Drama	Short			
1915	The Primrose Path	26	M.B. Havey	Scenario	Lawrence Marston	Universal	Universal	Dec-13-1915	Drama	Feature			
1916	The Law of Life	26	Maie B. Havey	Scenario	Henry MacRae	IMP	Universal	Jan-7-1916	Drama	Short			
1916	Love's Pilgrimage to America	26	May B. Havey	Scenario	Lawrence Marston	Universal	Universal	Jan-10-1916	Comedy	Feature			
1916	The Wrong Mary Wright	26	Maie Havey	Scenario	Millard K. Wilson	Victor	Universal	Jan-12-1916	Comedy	Short			
1916	A Sea Mystery	26	M.B. Havey	Scenario	Lucius J. Henderson	Victor	Universal	Jan-21-1916	Drama	Short			
1916	One Who Passed by	26	M. B. Havey	Scenario	Ben F. Wilson	Rex	Universal	Feb-6-1916	Drama	Short			
1916	Saved by a Song	26	Maie B. Havey	Scenario	Ben F. Wilson	Rex	Universal	Mar-5-1916	Drama	Short			
1916	Sunlight and Shadows	26	May B. Havey	Scenario	Brinsley Shaw	IMP	Universal	Mar-7-1916	Drama	Short			
1916	A Gentle Volunteer	26	Maie B. Havey	Story	Ben F. Wilson	IMP	Universal	May-28-1916	Drama	Short			
1916	The Sheriff of Pine Mountain	26	Maie B. Havey	Scenario	Ben F. Wilson	Rex	Universal	Jun-11-1916	Western	Short			
1916	The Perils of Divorce	26	Mabel Havey	Scenario	Edwin August	Peerless	World Film	Jun-12-1916	Drama	Feature			
1916	Main 4400	27	Maie Havey	Scenario	William Worthington	Victor	Universal	Oct-22-1916	Drama	Short			
1916	Her Vanished Youth	27	Maie Havey	Scenario	Fred Kelsey	Rex	Universal	Nov-4-1916	Drama	Short			
1916	The Eyes of Love	27	Mae B. Havey	Scenario	Fred Kelsey	Rex	Universal	Nov-10-1916	Drama	Short			
1916	The Devil's Bondwoman	27	Maie Harvey	Scenario	Lloyd B. Carleton	Universal	Universal	Nov-20-1916	Drama	Feature			
1916	The Emerald Pin	27	Maie Havey	Scenario	Burton George	Universal	Universal	Nov-23-1916	Drama	Short			
1916	Circumstantial Guilt	27	Maie Havey	Scenario	George Cochrane	Universal	Universal	Nov-24-1916	Drama	Short			
1916	The Penalty of Treason	27	Maie Havey	Scenario	Douglas Gerrard	Rex	Universal	Dec-10-1916	Drama	Short			
1916	Green Eyes	27	Maie Havey	Scenario	William Garwood	Universal	Universal	Dec-13-1916	Drama	Short			
1917	Her Soul's Inspiration	27	Maie Havey	Scenario	Jack Conway	Bluebird	Universal	Jan-15-1917	Drama	Feature			
1917	His Little Room Mate	27	Maie Havey	Scenario	Carter DeHaven	Victor	Universal	Jan-19-1917	Comedy	Short			
1917	The War Waif	27	Maie Havey	Scenario	Allen Holubar	Bluebird	Universal	Feb-1-1917	Drama	Short			
1917	Good Morning Nurse	27	Maie Havey	Scenario	Allen Curtis	Victor	Universal	Feb-6-1917	Comedy	Short			
1917	The High Cost of Starving	27	Maie Havey	Scenario	Leslie T. Peacocke	IMP	Universal	Feb-9-1917	Comedy	Short			
1917	The Girl Reporter's Scoop	27	Maie Havey	Scenario	Fred Kelsey	IMP	Universal	Feb-14-1917	Drama	Short			
1917	Somebody Lied	27	Maie Havey	Scenario	Ben F. Wilson	Victor	Universal	Apr-5-1917	Comedy	Short			
1917	A Jewel in Pawn	27	Maie Havey	Scenario	Jack Conway	Bluebird	Universal	Apr-16-1917	Drama	Feature			
1917	The Clock	27	Maie B. Havey	Scenario	William Worthington	Universal	Universal	Apr-30-1917	Comedy	Feature			
1917	Her City Beau	27	Maie Havey	Story	Millard K. Wilson	Victor	Universal	Jun-28-1917	Comedy	Short			
1917	The Girl in the Limousine	27	Maie Havey	Scenario	George Cochrane	IMP	Universal	Jul-8-1917	Drama	Short			
1917	A Five Foot Ruler	27	Maie Havey	Scenario	Carter DeHaven	Victor	Universal	Aug-20-1917	Comedy	Short			
1918	Her Body in Bond	28	Mabelle Harvey	Betty Coates	Robert Z. Leonard	Universal	Universal	Jun-16-1918	Drama	Feature	Actress		
1918	How Could You, Jean?	28	Mabelle Harvey	Susan Cooper	William Desmond Taylor	Mary Pickford	Artcraft	Jun-23-1918	Drama	Feature	Actress		
1918	O, Susie Behave	28	Mae Havey	Story	Alfred Santell	FTCC	World Film	Jul-22-1918	Comedy	Short	Fay Tincher		
1919	Hearts Asleep	29	Maie B. Havey	Story	Howard Hickman	B.B. Features	RC Dist	Mar-31-1919	Drama	Feature	Bessie Barriscale		
1919	Tangled Threads	29	M.B. Havey	Story	Howard Hickman	B.B. Features	RC Dist	Jun-21-1919	Drama	Feature	Bessie Barriscale		
1919	Dangerous Nan McGrew	29	Maie B. Havey	Scenario	Scott Sidney	Christie Film	Educational Film	Aug-2-1919	Comedy	Short	Fay Tincher		
1919	Her Purchase Price	29	M.B. Havey	Story	Howard Hickman	B.B. Features	RC Dist	Sep-1-1919	Drama	Feature	Bessie Barriscale		
1919	Kitty Kelly, M.D.	30	Maie B. Havey	Story	Howard Hickman	B.B. Features	RC Dist	Oct-5-1919	Comedy	Feature	Bessie Barriscale		
1919	A Trick of Fate	30	M.B. Havey	Story	Howard Hickman	B.B. Features	RC Dist	Feb-24-1920	Drama	Feature	Bessie Barriscale		
1919	The Notorious Mrs. Sands	30	M.B. Havey	Story	Christy Cabanne	B.B. Features	RC Dist	May-9-1920	Drama	Feature	Bessie Barriscale		
1920	A Seaside Siren	30	Maie B. Havey	Story	William Beaudine	Christie Film	Educational Film	Jul-25-1920	Comedy	Short	Fay Tincher		
Primary Sources: ◆ The Universal Silents: A Filmography of the Universal Motion Picture Manufacturing Company, 1912-1929 by R.E. Braff 1999 ◆ American Film Personnel and Company Credits, 1908 - 1920 by Paul Spehr & Gunnar Lundquist 1996 ◆ The AFI Catalog of Feature Films https://aficatalog.afi.com/

== Sources ==
- Billboard Music Week. Billboard Publications. 1917.
- Braff, R.E. (1999). The Universal Silents: A Filmography of the Universal Motion Picture Manufacturing Company, 1912-1929. McFarland. ISBN 978-0-7864-0287-8.
- Martin, A.; Clark, V.M.; University Publications of America; Library of Congress. Copyright Office (1987). A Guide to the Microfilm Edition of What Women Wrote: Scenarios, 1912-1929. Cinema history microfilm series. University Publications of America. ISBN 978-0-89093-988-8.
- Moving Picture Exhibitors' Association (1913). The Moving Picture World. Chalmers Publishing Company.
- Spehr, Paul E.; Lundquist, Gunnar (1996). American Film Personnel and Company Credits, 1908 - 1920. Jefferson, North Carolina: McFarland & Company, Inc. p. 695. ISBN 0-7864-0255-5.
