= Beckoning Roads =

1919 film by Howard Hickman

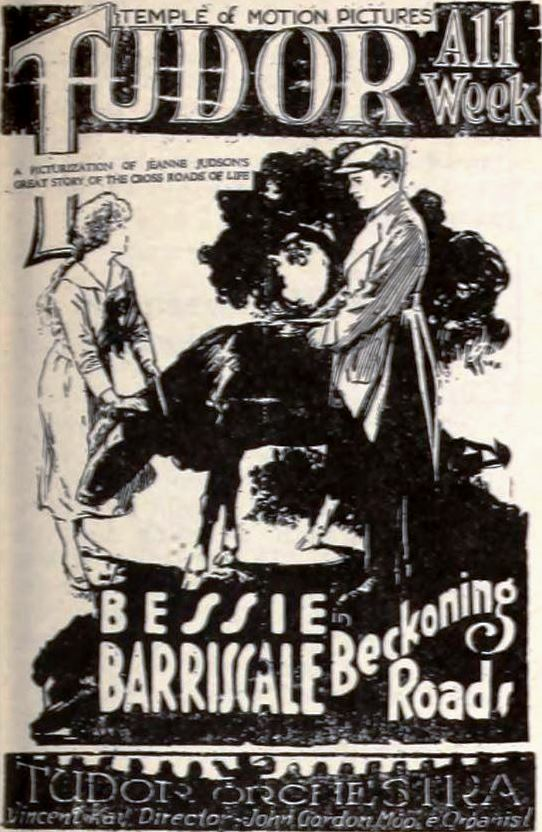
- Newspaper advertisement for Beckoning Roads reprinted in a 1920 issue of Exhibitors Herald
- Directed by: Howard C. Hickman
- Written by: Harvey Gates (scenario)
- Based on: The Call of Life by Jeanne Judson
- Produced by: Bessie Barriscale
- Starring: Bessie Barriscale
- Cinematography: Eugene Gaudio
- Distributed by: Robertson-Cole
- Release date: December 14, 1919
- Running time: 5 reels
- Country: United States
- Languages: Silent (English intertitles)

Beckoning Roads is a 1919 American silent drama film based on the novel The Call of Life by Jeanne Judson. The novel was originally serialized in Red Book Magazine from August to December 1918.

It was directed by Howard C. Hickman and Bessie Barriscale was producer and star. It was released by Robertson-Cole Distributing Corp. on December 14, 1919.

== Plot ==
As described in a film magazine, Marquita Shay was brought up by an adoptive father, John Grayson, on a farm in Canada. The two travel to St. Louis, where she meet and subsequently marries Humphrey Wells. Their marital bliss dissolves quickly when Marquita meets Humphrey's parents, especially his domineering father. Her in-laws treat her very poorly and upon the discovery that new husband has no backbone, Marquita leaves her husband to return to her father's farm.

Unfortunately, Marquita discovers that her father has committed suicide after a ruinous financial turn engineered by her swindler father-in-law. Marquita ventures to New York City, where she gets work as a secretary for Wells, Sr.'s business partner. Marquita manages to ruin the shady financier and reunites with her husband, who has finally renounced his terrible father.

== Cast ==
- Bessie Barriscale as Marquita Shay
- Niles Welch as Humphrey Wells
- George Periolat as John Grayson
- Joseph J. Dowling as Baron Brinker
- Emmett King as Henry Wells
- Dorcas Matthews as Mrs. Rose-Gordon Chester
- Thomas Holding as Cecil Barrington

== Preservation ==
With no prints of Beckoning Roads located in any film archives, it is considered a lost film. In February 2021, the film was cited by the National Film Preservation Board on their Lost U.S. Silent Feature Films list.
