= The Reward (1915 film) =

- Directed by: Reginald Barker
- Written by: C. Gardner Sullivan
- Produced by: Thomas H. Ince
- Starring: Bessie Barriscale
- Edited by: Thomas H. Ince; E.H. Allen
- Production company: New York Motion Picture Corp.
- Distributed by: Mutual Film
- Release date: June 24, 1915
- Country: United States
- Languages: Silent; English intertitles

The Reward is a 1915 film by Reginald Barker starring Bessie Barriscale, Arthur Maude and Louise Glaum. Barriscale plays a moral chorus girl whom Maude's character attempts to entice to a wild party life for a bet.

== Cast ==
- Bessie Barriscale as Jane Wallace
- Arthur Maude as Dan Conby
- Louise Glaum as Trixie
- Margaret Thompson as Pinkie

== Reception ==
Writing for Motion Picture Story Magazine, Allan Douglas Brodie gave Barriscale's acting glowing reviews: "...the artistic work of Miss Barriscale will live in the memories of picture-lovers for many a long day. I refer to "The Cup of Life" and “ The Reward,” both of which are superb vehicles for the display of this artiste's admirable acting."

== Preservation ==
With no prints of The Reward located in any film archives, it is considered a lost film.
