= The Luck of Geraldine Laird =

1920 film directed by Edward Sloman

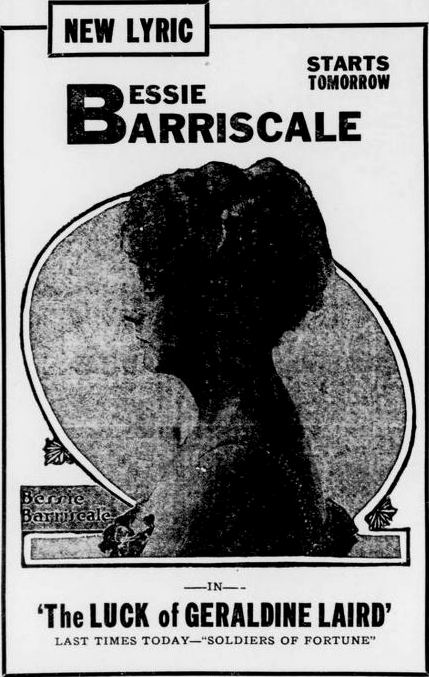
- Newspaper ad for The Luck of Geraldine Laird from a 1920 issue of The Duluth Herald
- Directed by: Edward Sloman
- Written by: Harvey Gates
- Based on: The Luck of Geraldine Laird by Kathleen Norris
- Produced by: Bessie Barriscale
- Starring: Bessie Barriscale
- Cinematography: Eugene Gaudio
- Production company: B. B. Features
- Distributed by: Robertson-Cole
- Release date: February 1, 1920
- Running time: 5 reels
- Country: United States
- Languages: Silent; English intertitles

The Luck of Geraldine Laird is a 1920 silent film drama directed by Edward Sloman and starring Bessie Barriscale. It was produced by Bessie Barriscale Productions and released through the Robertson Cole Distributing Corp.

== Plot ==
As described in a film magazine, Geraldine Laird, her husband, Dean, and their two children all live together with Geraldine's mother. This arrangement is not ideal to Dean, who has ambitions of being a playwright. After Kennedy Bond, New-York play-broker, encourages Dean, he travels to New York. Bond also begins a flirtation with Geraldine, further alienating the couple. Dean deserts his family.

Later, Geraldine relocates to New York and becomes a popular music hall entertainer. Geraldine is reunited with Dean at a dinner held in her honor and finds that he has found only failure as a playwright. Initially, Geraldine rebukes him, but once she sees how much he has suffered, forgives him and they reconcile.

== Cast ==
- Bessie Barriscale - Geraldine Laird
- Niles Welch - Dean Laird
- Boyd Irwin - Louis Redding
- Dorcas Matthews - Kennedy Bond
- William V. Mong - Leo Goldman
- Rosita Marstini - Paula Lucas
- Ashton Dearholt - George Fitzpatrick
- Mary Jane Irving - Child
- Jeanne Carpenter - Child (billed Theo-Alice Carpenter)

== Preservation ==
With no prints of The Luck of Geraldine Laird located in any film archives, it is considered a lost film. In February 2021, the film was cited by the National Film Preservation Board on their Lost U.S. Silent Feature Films list.
