= All of a Sudden Norma =

1919 film directed by Howard Hickman

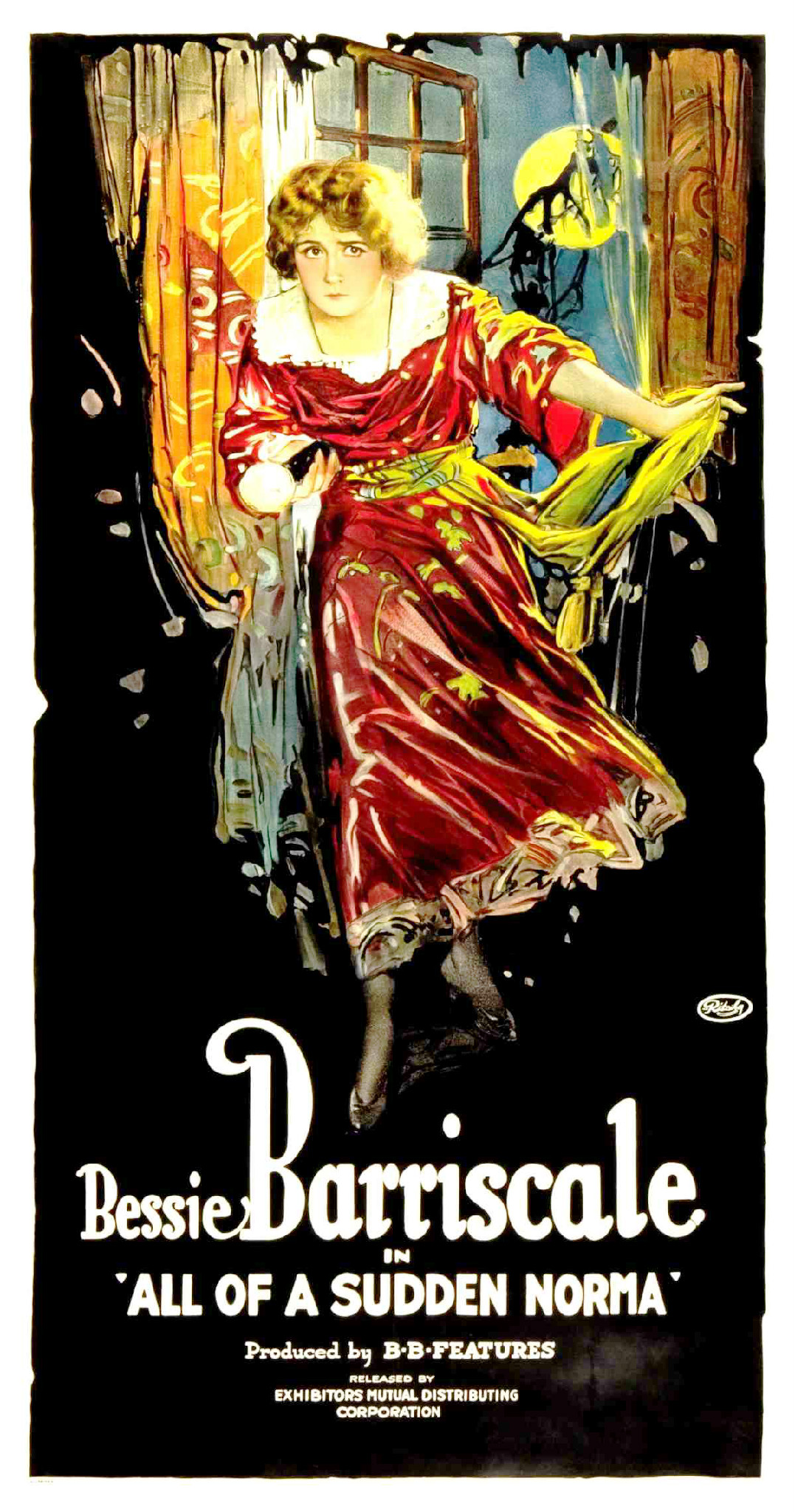
- Directed by: Howard C. Hickman
- Written by: Jack Cunningham; Thomas Edgelow (story)
- Produced by: Bessie Barriscale
- Starring: Bessie Barriscale
- Cinematography: L. Guy Wilky
- Distributed by: Robertson-Cole
- Release date: January 5, 1919
- Running time: 5 reels
- Country: United States
- Language: Silent (English intertitles)

All of a Sudden Norma is a 1919 American silent comedy-drama film directed by Howard C. Hickman and starring Mrs. Hickman, aka Bessie Barriscale who produced the film. It was distributed by Robertson-Cole Corporation.

== Cast ==
- Bessie Barriscale as Norma Brisbane
- Joseph J. Dowling as Hamilton Brisbane
- Albert R. Cody as Cuthbert Van Zelt
- R. Henry Grey as Oliver Garrett
- Frank Leigh as Duke of Duffield
- Melbourne MacDowell as Emerson Trent

== Preservation ==
With no prints of All of a Sudden Norma located in any film archives, it is considered a lost film.
