= Hearts Asleep =

1918 film by Howard Hickman

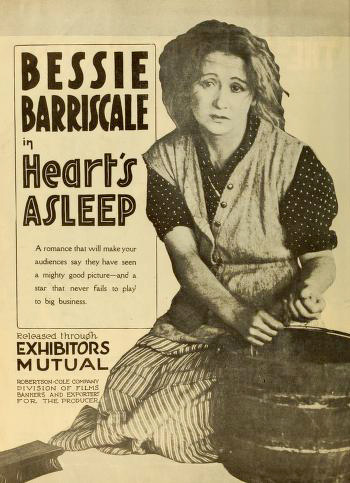
- Advertisement from a 1919 issue of The Moving Picture World
- Directed by: Howard Hickman
- Written by: Fred Myton; Maie B. Havey
- Produced by: Bessie Barriscale
- Starring: Bessie Barriscale
- Production companies: B. B. Features, Inc.
- Distributed by: Robertson-Cole
- Release date: March 31, 1919
- Running time: 5 reels
- Country: United States
- Language: Silent (English intertitles)

Hearts Asleep is a 1919 American silent crime drama film directed by Howard Hickman and produced by and starring his wife Bessie Barriscale. It was distributed through the Robertson-Cole Company.

== Plot ==
As described in a film magazine, Nancy (Barriscale) is the orphan charge of underworld fence Mother Hawkins (Dodge), but has managed to remain honest despite her patrons instructions to make her a thief. Gentleman Chi (Woodward), a notorious second story man, visits Mother Hawkins and buys her rights to Nancy, taking her with him as he goes to loot a residence. She escapes to the home of John Lewis (Whitson), who sends her to school. Gentleman Chi is caught and sent to prison for five years. Five years pass and Nancy is introduced by Lewis as his niece and moves in society until Chi, released from prison, comes to a house party and tries to force her to aid him in a contemplated theft of jewelry. She refuses, but the daughter of the host aids in the burglary and Nancy takes the blame to shield her. At the last moment the daughter confesses and saves Nancy. Lewis decides he is tired of the "uncle" role and asks Nancy to marry him, and she accepts.

== Cast ==
- Bessie Barriscale as Nancy
- Vola Vale as Virginia Calvert
- Frank Whitson as John Lewis
- George Fisher as Randolph Lee
- Henry Woodward as Gentleman Chi
- Tom Guise as Andrew Calvert
- Anna Dodge as Mother Hawkins

== Preservation ==
With no prints of Hearts Asleep located in any film archives, it is considered a lost film. In October 2020, the film was cited by the National Film Preservation Board on their Lost U.S. Silent Feature Films list.
