= The Sorrows of Love =

1916 film

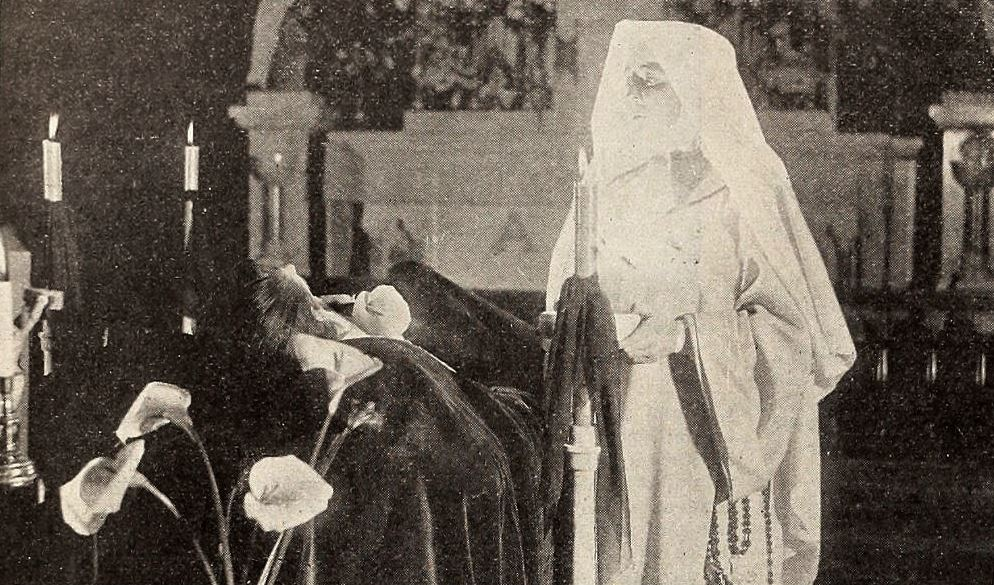
- Still from the film The Sorrows of Love in the film magazine Cine-Mundial, August 1916
- Directed by: Charles Giblyn
- Written by: Elaine Sterne; J. G. Hawks
- Produced by: Thomas H. Ince
- Starring: Bessie Barriscale
- Cinematography: Fredie Betz
- Production company: New York Motion Picture Corp.
- Distributed by: Triangle Film
- Release date: June 11, 1916
- Country: United States
- Languages: Silent; English titles

The Sorrows of Love is a 1916 American silent drama starring Bessie Barriscale and written by Elaine Sterne and J.G. Hawks. The film was released by Triangle Film on June 11, 1916.

== Cast ==
- Bessie Barriscale as Beatrice
- William Desmond as Guido Perli
- Ora Carew as Contessa Angelica de Vecchio
- Herschel Mayall as Prince Candoni
- Wedgwood Nowell as Carlo Parodi

== Preservation ==
With no prints of The Sorrows of Love located in any film archives, it is considered a lost film. In February 2021, the film was cited by the National Film Preservation Board on their Lost U.S. Silent Feature Films list.
