= Kitty Kelly, M.D. =

1919 film by Howard Hickman

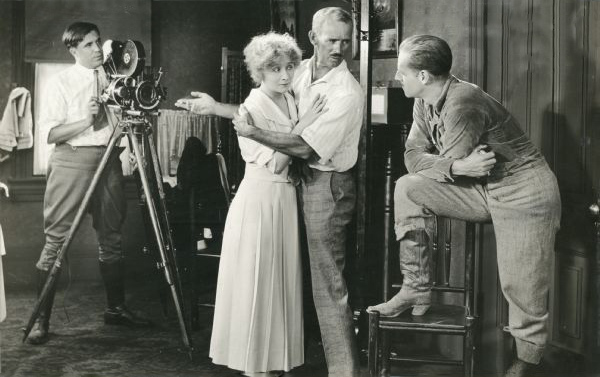
- Production still featuring Hickman, Barriscale, Holt, and cinematographer Gaudio
- Directed by: Howard Hickman
- Written by: Maie B. Havey; Howard Hickman
- Produced by: Bessie Barriscale
- Starring: Bessie Barriscale; Jack Holt; Joseph J. Dowling
- Cinematography: Eugene Gaudio
- Production company: Bessie Barriscale Productions
- Distributed by: Robertson-Cole Distributing Corporation
- Release date: October 12, 1919
- Country: United States
- Languages: Silent; English intertitles

Kitty Kelly, M.D. is a 1919 American silent comedy-drama film directed by Howard Hickman and starring Bessie Barriscale, Jack Holt and Joseph J. Dowling.

== Cast ==
- Bessie Barriscale as Dr. Kitty Kelly
- Jack Holt as Bob Lang
- Joseph J. Dowling as Sheriff
- Wedgwood Nowell as Jerry Williams
- Mildred Manning as Lola
- Tom Guise

== Preservation ==
A print of Kitty Kelly, M.D. is held by the Archives du Film du CNC in Bois d'Arcy. Its Library of Congress database entry does not specify the print's completeness or format.

== Bibliography ==
- Leonhard Gmür. Rex Ingram: Hollywood's Rebel of the Silver Screen. 2013.
