= Henry Kolker =

American actor and film director (1874–1947)

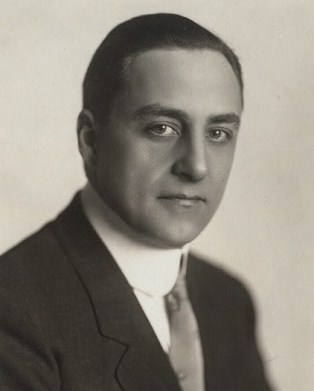
- Kolker, c. 1910
- Born: Joseph Henry Kolker; December 13, 1874; Berlin, Germany
- Died: July 15, 1947 (aged 72); Los Angeles, California, U.S.
- Occupations: Actor; Film director
- Years active: 1914–1947
- Spouse(s): Margaret Bruenn (1926–1947; her death); Lillian Carroll (?–1926)(suicide 1935)

Joseph Henry Kolker (November 13, 1874 – July 15, 1947) was an American stage and film actor and director.

== Early years ==
Kolker was born in Berlin, Germany, in 1874. (Some sources say 1870.) He came to America at age five and was educated by Franciscan Monks at Quincy, Illinois.

== Career ==
Kolker had a substantial stage career before entering silent films. He began acting professionally in stock theater in 1895. On stage he appeared opposite actresses such as Edith Wynne Matthison, Bertha Kalich and Ruth Chatterton. Kolker bore a resemblance to John Drew and this was accentuated when he started wearing a moustache and as he aged. Some thought he was Drew's son and a part of the Barrymore family.

Kolker began acting in films in 1915. He is best remembered for his movie roles, including one in the ground-breaking Pre-Code film Baby Face (1933) as an elderly CEO. Another well-remembered part is as Mr. Seton, father of Katharine Hepburn and Lew Ayres in the 1938 film Holiday directed by George Cukor.

Kolker also directed. His best-known effort is Disraeli (1921), starring George Arliss, which is now a mostly lost film with only one reel remaining, and not to be confused with a later sound era portrayal by Arliss of the same name.

== Personal life ==
Kolker was married to Lillian Carroll; they divorced in 1926. Soon after the divorce, he married Margaret Bruen.

Kolker died on July 15, 1947, aged 72.

== Selected filmography ==
=== As actor ===
- The Bigger Man (1915) as John Stoddard
- The Warning (1915) as Robert Denman
- How Molly Made Good (1915, cameo as himself)
- Gloria's Romance (1916) as Dr. Stephen Royce
- The Shell Game (1918) as Lawrence Gray
- Social Hypocrites (1918) as Dr. Frank Simpson
- The House of Mirth (1918) as Lawrence Selden
- The Great Victory (1918) as Kaiser Wilhelm II
- The Parisian Tigress (1919) as Henri Dutray
- Blackie's Redemption (1919) as Fred the Count
- The Red Lantern (1919)
- Tangled Threads (1919) as Dr. MacGregor
- The Brat (1919) as A Dandy
- Her Purchase Price (1919) as Duke of Wryden
- A Man of Stone (1921)
- Any Woman (1925) as Egbert Phillips
- Sally, Irene and Mary (1925) as Marcus Morton
- The Palace of Pleasure (1926) as Premier
- Hell's Four Hundred (1926) as John Gilmore
- Winning the Futurity (1926) (scenes deleted)
- Wet Paint (1926) as A Husband
- A Kiss in a Taxi (1927) as Leon Lambert
- Annie Laurie (1927) as King's Representative
- Rough House Rosie (1927) as W.S. Davids
- Soft Living (1928) as Roidney S. Bowen
- Midnight Rose (1928) as Corbin
- The Charge of the Gauchos (1928) as Viceroy Cisneros
- Don't Marry (1928) as Gen. Willoughby
- Coquette (1929) as Jasper Carter
- The Valiant (1929) as Judge
- Pleasure Crazed (1929) as Col. Farquar
- Love, Live and Laugh (1929) as Enrico
- The Bad One (1930) as Prosecutor
- East Is West (1930) as Butler
- Abraham Lincoln (1930) as New Englander
- The Way of All Men (1930) as Sharp
- Du Barry, Woman of Passion (1930) as D'Aiguillon
- East Is West (1930) as Mr. Benson
- One Heavenly Night (1931) as Prefect of Police
- Don't Bet on Women (1931) as Butterfield
- Doctors' Wives (1931) as Hospital Official
- Quick Millions (1931) as District Attorney
- Indiscreet (1931) as Mr. Woodward
- The Spy (1931) as Tchijinski
- I Like Your Nerve (1931) as Areal Pacheco
- The Unholy Garden (1931) as Col. Lautrac
- The Yellow Ticket (1931) as Passport Clerk
- The Washington Masquerade (1932) as Stapleton
- Jewel Robbery (1932) as Baron Franz
- The First Year (1932) as Peter Barstow
- Devil and the Deep (1932) as Hutton
- Down to Earth (1932) as Randolph
- The Crash (1932) as John Fair
- Faithless (1932) as Mr. Carter
- Rasputin and the Empress (1932) as Chief of Secret Police
- The Keyhole (1933) as Schuyler Brooks
- Gabriel Over the White House (1933) as Sen. Langham – Senate Majority Leader
- Hello, Sister! (1933) as Jameson Brewster, Bank President
- A Bedtime Story (1933) as Agent de Police
- Hell Below (1933) as Adm. Sir Hugh Higby
- The Narrow Corner (1933) as Mr. Blake, Fred's Father
- Baby Face (1933) as Carter
- Notorious But Nice (1933) as Defense Attorney Clark
- The Power and the Glory (1933) as Mr. Borden
- Bureau of Missing Persons (1933) as Theodore Arno
- Golden Harvest (1933) as Henry Flint
- I Loved a Woman (1933) as Mr. Sanborn
- Love, Honor, and Oh Baby! (1933) as The Judge
- Gigolettes of Paris (1933) as Police Interrogator
- Meet the Baron (1933) as Baron Munchausen
- Blood Money (1933) as Newspaper Managing Editor
- Massacre (1934) as Sen. Woolsey
- Bedside (1934) as Maritza's Manager
- I've Got Your Number (1934) as Robert Kirkland
- The Cat and the Fiddle (1934) as Theatre Manager
- Wonder Bar (1934) as Mr. R.H. Renaud
- Journal of a Crime (1934) as Henri Marcher
- Success at Any Price (1934) as Hatfield
- Sisters Under the Skin (1934) as Jones
- Let's Talk It Over (1934) as Doctor
- Black Moon (1934) as The Psychiatrist
- The Hell Cat (1934) as C.W. Sloane
- Let's Try Again (1934) as Mr. Blake
- Stamboul Quest (1934) as 'Excellency' German War Office
- Whom the Gods Destroy (1934) as Carlo, the Puppeteer
- Blind Date (1934) as J.W. Hartwell Sr.
- Name the Woman (1934) as Judge Adams
- The Girl From Missouri (1934) as Sen. Titcombe
- She Loves Me Not (1934) as Charles M. Lawton
- Now and Forever (1934) as Mr. Clark
- Million Dollar Ransom (1934) Dr. Davis
- One Exciting Adventure (1934) as Customer
- A Lost Lady (1934) as John Ormsby
- Lady by Choice (1934) as Opper
- Imitation of Life (1934) as Dr. Preston
- Love Time (1934) as Emperor Francis I
- Kid Millions (1934) as Attorney
- The Ghost Walks (1934) as Dr. Kent
- Sing Sing Nights (1934) as Kurt Nordon
- The Band Plays On (1934) as Professor Hackett
- Charlie Chan in Paris (1935) as M. Lamartine
- Society Doctor (1935) as Dr. Harvey
- Red Hot Tires (1935) as Martin Sanford
- The Mystery Man (1935) as Ellwyn A. 'Jo-Jo' Jonas
- One New York Night (1935) as Arthur Carlisle
- Times Square Lady (1935) as Mr. Fielding
- A Dog of Flanders (1935) as Monsieur LaTour, Art Critic
- The Florentine Dagger (1935) as Auctioneer
- The Case of the Curious Bride (1935) as District Attorney Stacey
- Reckless (1935) as Mr. Gearhart
- Go Into Your Dance (1935) as Doctor
- Spring Tonic (1935) as Mr. Enix
- Honeymoon Limited (1935) as Mr. Randall
- Mad Love (1935) as Prefect Rosset
- The Black Room (1935) as Baron Frederick de Berghman
- Here Comes the Band (1935) as Simmon's Attorney
- Diamond Jim (1935) as J.C. Randolf, Bank President
- Ladies Love Danger (1935) as Jose Lopez
- Red Salute (1935) as Dean
- I Live My Life (1935) as Relative at Mrs. Gage's
- Shipmates Forever (1935) as The Doctor
- The Last Days of Pompeii (1935) as Warder
- Three Kids and a Queen (1935) as Crippets
- Frisco Waterfront (1935) as District Attorney
- The Great Impersonation (1935) as Dr. Schmidt
- Collegiate (1936) as Mr. MacGregor
- My Marriage (1936) as Maj. Vaile
- Bullets or Ballots (1936) as Mr. Hollister
- Romeo and Juliet (1936) as Friar Laurence
- Sitting on the Moon (1936) as Worthington
- In His Steps (1936) as Calvin Carver
- The Man Who Lived Twice (1936) as Judge Henry Treacher
- Theodora Goes Wild (1936) as Jonathan Grant
- Great Guy (1936) as Abel Canning
- Under Cover of Night (1937) as District Attorney Pritchard
- Once a Doctor (1937) as Dr. Bruce Nordland
- They Wanted to Marry (1937) as Mr. Hunter
- Green Light (1937) as Dr. Lane
- Maid of Salem (1937) as Crown Chief Justice Laughton
- Let Them Live (1937) as Judge Lederer
- The Devil Is Driving (1937) as Charles Stevens
- Conquest (1937) as Sen. Wybitcki
- Thoroughbreds Don't Cry (1937) as 'Doc' Godfrey
- The Invisible Menace (1938) as Col. Hackett
- Love Is a Headache (1938) as Mr. Sam Ellinger
- The Adventures of Marco Polo (1938) as Nicolo Polo
- Holiday (1938) as Edward Seton Sr.
- Safety in Numbers (1938) as Dr. Lawrence Edmonds
- Marie Antoinette (1938) as Court Aide
- Too Hot to Handle (1938) as "Pearly" Todd
- The Cowboy and the Lady (1938) as Horace Smith
- Let Us Live (1939) as Chief of Police
- Union Pacific (1939) as Asa M. Barrows
- Should Husbands Work? (1939) as Taylor
- These Glamour Girls (1939) as Philip S. Griswold II
- Hidden Power (1939) as Weston
- The Real Glory (1939) as The General
- Parents on Trial (1939) as James Wesley
- Here I Am a Stranger (1939) as R.J. Bennett
- Main Street Lawyer (1939) as Donnelly, District Attorney
- Grand Ole Opry (1940) as William C. Scully
- Money and the Woman (1940) as Mr. Rollins, Barbara's Father
- Las Vegas Nights (1941) as John Stevens
- The Man Who Lost Himself (1941) as Mulhausen
- The Great Swindle (1941) as Stewart Cordell
- A Woman's Face (1941) as Judge
- The Parson of Panamint (1941) as Judge Arnold Mason
- Sing for Your Supper (1941) as Myron T. Hayworth
- Reunion in France (1942) as General Bartholomew
- Sarong Girl (1943) as Mr. Jefferson Baxter
- Bluebeard (1944) as Deschamps
- The Secret Life of Walter Mitty (1947) as Dr. Benbow

=== As director ===
Kolker directed 18 feature films, most of them lost.

- Santo Icario (1914)
- A Man's Country (1919)
- The Woman Michael Married (1919)
- The Third Generation (1920)
- Bright Skies (1920)
- Heart of Twenty (1920)
- The Palace of Darkened Windows (1920)
- The Greatest Love (1920)
- Bucking the Tiger (1921)
- Who Am I? (1921)
- The Fighter (1921)
- Disraeli (1921)
- The Leopardess (1923)
- Sant'Ilario (1923)
- The Snow Bride (1923)
- The Purple Highway (1923)
- I Will Repay (1923)
- The Great Well (1924)

=== As writer ===
- The Man with the Iron Heart (1915, short)
- The Third Generation (1920)
