= L. Guy Wilky =

American cinematographer

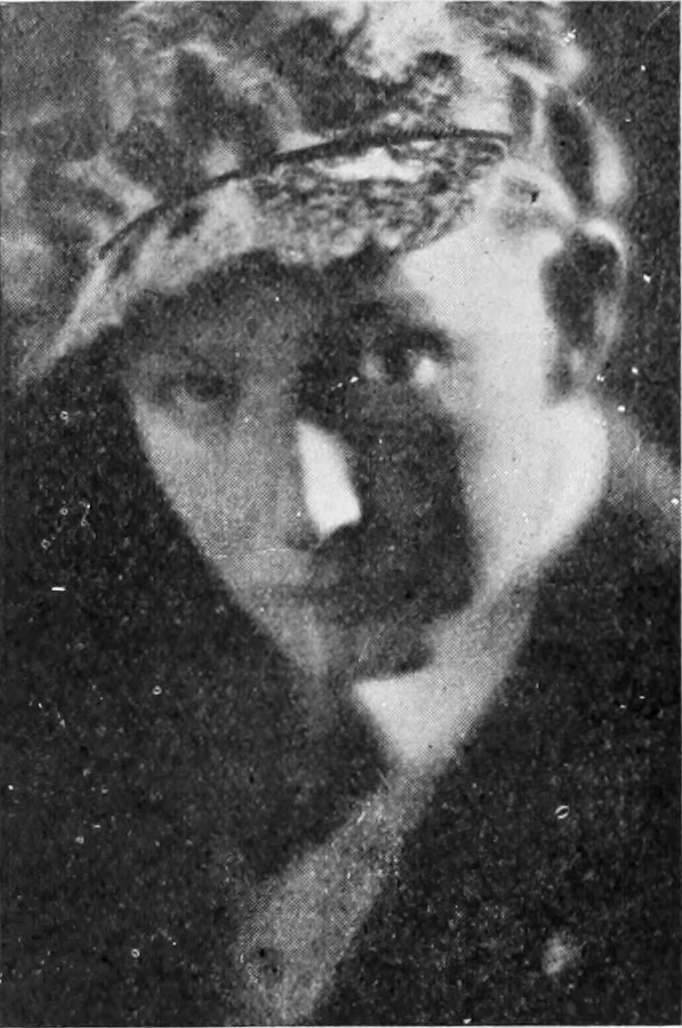
- Born: Leslie Guy Wilky; October 12, 1888; Phoenix, Arizona, USA
- Died: December 25, 1971 (aged 83); Walnut Creek, California, USA
- Education: University of Arizona
- Occupation: Cinematographer

Leslie Guy Wilky (1888–1971) was an American cinematographer who worked in Hollywood in the 1910s and the 1920s. He often collaborated with director William C. deMille. Wilky was born in Phoenix, Arizona, to William Wilky and Emma Mosier. He later attended the University of Arizona, where he studied engineering, before moving to Santa Barbara, California, and finding work as a cinematographer at Flying A Studios. Eventually he ended up in Los Angeles, where he had a substantial career at Paramount. He was also a founding member of the American Society of Cinematographers.

== Selected filmography ==
- 1928 The Power of Silence
- 1927 One Woman to Another
- 1925 The Splendid Crime
- 1925 New Brooms
- 1925 The Trouble with Wives
- 1925 Lost: A Wife
- 1925 Men and Women
- 1925 New Lives for Old (as Guy Wilky)
- 1925 Locked Doors
- 1924 The Fast Set
- 1924 The Man Who Fights Alone
- 1924 The Bedroom Window
- 1923 Don't Call It Love
- 1923 The Marriage Maker
- 1923 Adam's Rib
- 1923 Only 38 (as Guy Wilky)
- 1923 The World's Applause
- 1922 Nice People (as Guy Wilky)
- 1922 Our Leading Citizen
- 1922 Bought and Paid For
- 1921 Miss Lulu Bett
- 1921 After the Show
- 1921 The Lost Romance (as Guy Wilky)
- 1921 What Every Woman Knows
- 1920 Midsummer Madness (as Guy Wilky)
- 1920 Conrad in Quest of His Youth
- 1920 The Prince Chap
- 1920 Jack Straw
- 1920 The Tree of Knowledge (as Guy Wilky)
- 1919 The Woman Michael Married
- 1919 Tangled Threads
- 1919 Josselyn's Wife
- 1919 All of a Sudden Norma
- 1918 Two-Gun Betty
- 1918 The Goddess of Lost Lake
- 1917 A Man's Man
