= The Woman Michael Married =

1919 film by Henry Kolker

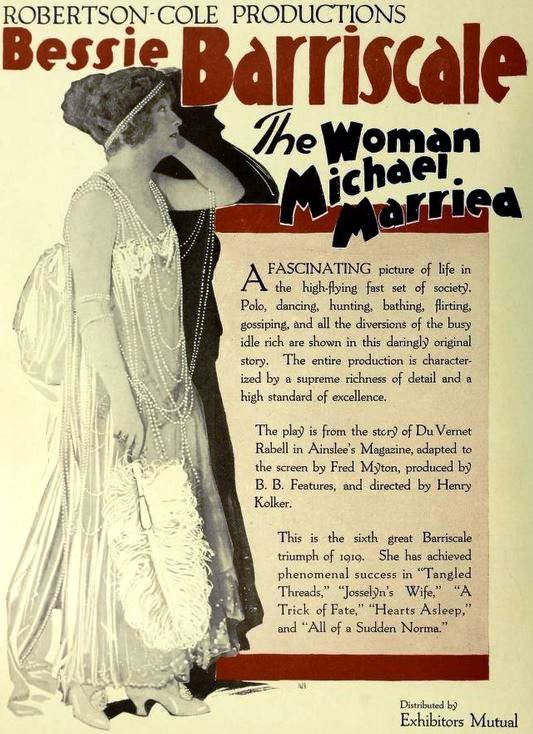
- Advertisement The Woman Michael Married from a 1919 issue of Motion Picture News
- Directed by: Henry Kolker
- Written by: based on novelette, The Woman Michael Married, by Du Vernet Rabell appearing in Ainslee's Magazine, Dec. 1918
- Produced by: Bessie Barriscale
- Starring: Bessie Barriscale
- Cinematography: L. Guy Wilky
- Production company: Bessie Barriscale Productions
- Distributed by: Robertson-Cole through Exhibitors Mutual Distributing Corp.
- Release date: July 27, 1919
- Running time: 5 reels
- Country: United States
- Language: Silent (English intertitles)

The Woman Michael Married is a 1919 American silent society drama film directed by Henry Kolker and produced by and starring Bessie Barriscale. Distribution of the film was through newly formed Robertson-Cole, soon to form into the FBO company.

== Plot ==
As described in a film magazine, after professional diver Mira Sacky (Barriscale) rescues a child from the incoming tide, Michael Ordsway (Holt), a son of wealth, offers her any reward she might mention. She demands that he marry her. Being a good sport, he does so. Then she offers to leave him for $10,000 and the protection of his name for two years, but he refuses. To quiet talk about them, she lives with him for a while but as a wife in name only. She entertains his guests until one of them insults her, and she leaves. Michael's father (Guise), while strolling on the beach one day, meets Mira and, upon learning her identity, attempts to bring about a reconciliation. Michael refuses and goes abroad. Visiting his sister in Rome two years later he finds Mira a prima donna. Realizing that they love each other, they put aside their differences.

== Cast ==
- Bessie Barriscale as Mira Sacky
- Jack Holt as Michael Ordsway
- Marcia Manon as Doris Steele
- Tom Guise as Ordsway, Sr.
- Charles H. West as Harvey Kirkland
- Bonnie Hill as Leila, Princess Marchesi
- Cameron Coffey as Bobby
- Mary Jane Irving as Girl

== Preservation ==
With no prints of The Woman Michael Married located in any film archives, it is considered a lost film. In February 2021, the film was cited by the National Film Preservation Board on their Lost U.S. Silent Feature Films list.
