= Herschel Mayall =

American actor (1863–1941)

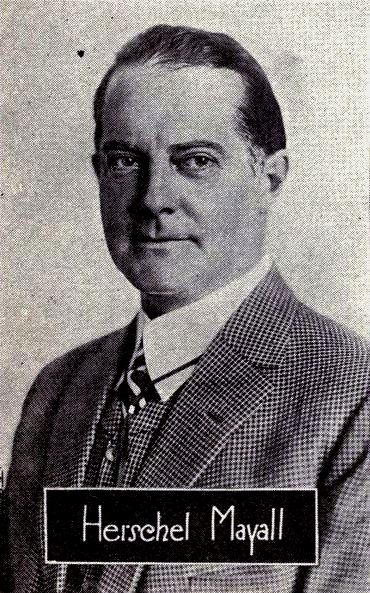
- Mayall in 1921
- Born: July 12, 1863; Bowling Green, Kentucky, U.S.
- Died: June 10, 1941 (aged 77); Detroit, Michigan, U.S.
- Occupation: Actor
- Years active: 1912–1935

Herschel Mayall (July 12, 1863 – June 10, 1941) was an American stage and film actor of the silent era. He appeared in more than 110 films between 1912 and 1935.

== Biography ==
He was born in Bowling Green, Kentucky, and died in Detroit, Michigan from a cerebral hemorrhage. Mayall was the son of James H. Mayall and Merilla L. Mayall.

Mayall acted on stage, joining the Pike Opera House Company in Cincinnati, Ohio, in 1897 and staying there until the theater burned in 1902, He returned to Cincinnati in 1905 to join the Forepaugh Stock Company and acted with that group for three seasons. In 1906, he was "considered 'Frisco's most popular actor" when the 1906 San Francisco earthquake closed the Alhambra theater, where he had been performing. He and a group of other actors from that theater formed a company that began performing in cities that included Salt Lake City and Reno, Nevada. On Broadway, Mayall portrayed Father Roubier in The Garden of Allah (1911) and Laertes in Hamlet (1912). He also directed Deep Channels (1929) on Broadway.

== Filmography ==
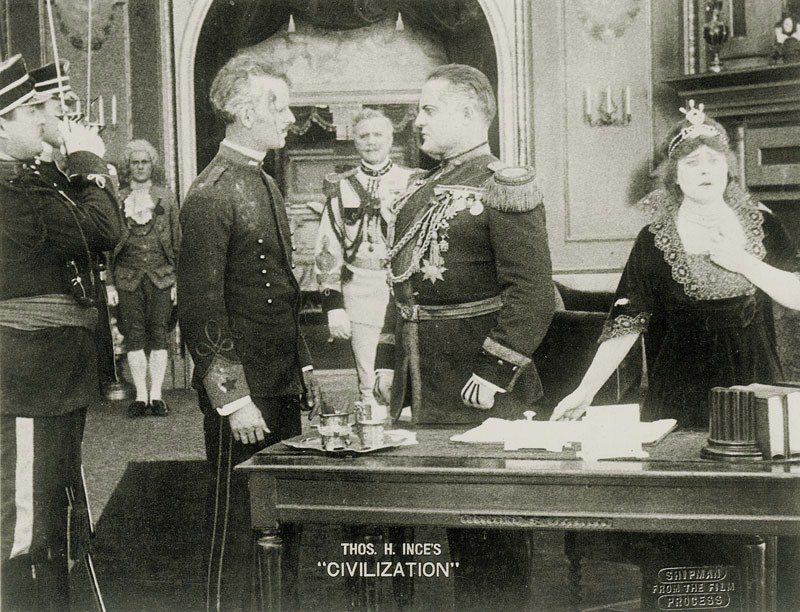
Mayall (second from right) in still from Civilization (1916)

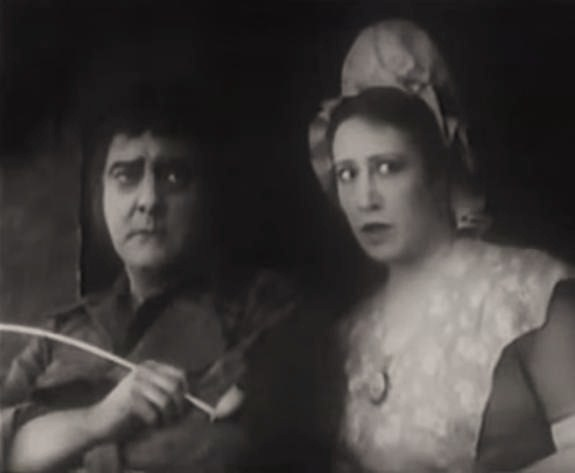
Mayall with Rosita Marstini in A Tale of Two Cities (1917)

| Year | Title | Role | Notes |
|---|---|---|---|
| 1913 | The Battle of Gettysburg | | |
| 1914 | The Wrath of the Gods | | |
| 1914 | The Voice at the Telephone | Spike Kennedy | |
| 1914 | The Typhoon | | |
| 1914 | The Bargain | Gambler | Uncredited |
| 1915 | On the Night Stage | Handsome Jack Malone | |
| 1915 | The Man from Oregon | William Landers | |
| 1915 | Civilization | The King of Wredpryd | |
| 1916 | The Aryan | Chip Emmett | |
| 1916 | The Sorrows of Love | Prince Candoni | |
| 1916 | The Beast | David Manning | |
| 1916 | Sins of Her Parent | Jim McNeil | |
| 1916 | The Road to Love | Sidi Malik | |
| 1917 | The Island of Desire | Henry Sayres | |
| 1917 | A Tale of Two Cities | Jacques Defarge | |
| 1917 | High Finance | Jonathan Platt | |
| 1917 | Some Boy! | William Johnson | |
| 1917 | Cleopatra | Ventidius | |
| 1917 | The Rose of Blood | Koliensky | |
| 1917 | The Babes in the Woods | John Hamilton | |
| 1917 | Madame Du Barry | Jean DuBarry | |
| 1918 | Treasure Island | Prologue Player | |
| 1918 | Carmen of the Klondike | 'Silk' McDonald | |
| 1918 | Shackled | Henry Hartman | |
| 1918 | Honor's Cross | Thomas Dolan | |
| 1918 | Patriotism | Sidney Carson | |
| 1918 | Wedlock | George Osborne | |
| 1918 | Maid o' the Storm | Abe Strohman | |
| 1918 | The Heart of Rachael | Clarence Breckenridge | |
| 1918 | The One Woman | Mark Overman | |
| 1919 | Todd of the Times | Harrison G. Monroe | |
| 1919 | The Man in the Open | Trevor | |
| 1919 | The Silver Girl | Gilman Parton | |
| 1919 | The Money Corral | Carl Bruler | |
| 1919 | The Divorce Trap | Daniel Drake | |
| 1919 | The Sleeping Lion | Durant | |
| 1919 | Bonds of Honor | Paul Berkowitz | |
| 1919 | Wings of the Morning | Col. Costabel | |
| 1920 | Daredevil Jack | Leonard Billigns | |
| 1920 | Drag Harlan | Lane Morgan | |
| 1920 | Kismet | Jawan | |
| 1920 | The Scuttlers | Captain Machen | |
| 1920 | The Coast of Opportunity | Julien Marr | |
| 1921 | The Blushing Bride | Lord Lansmere | |
| 1921 | The Queen of Sheba | Menton | |
| 1921 | Straight from the Shoulder | Joseph Martin | |
| 1921 | The Beautiful Gambler | Judge Rand | |
| 1921 | To a Finish | Joe Blake | |
| 1921 | Three Word Brand | Carroll | Uncredited |
| 1922 | Smiles Are Trumps | James Manning | |
| 1922 | Extra! Extra! | Edward Fletcher | |
| 1922 | Arabian Love | The Sheik | |
| 1922 | The Yellow Stain | Dr. Brown | |
| 1922 | Oath-Bound | Captain Steele | |
| 1922 | Calvert's Valley | Judge Rymal | |
| 1922 | Thirty Days | Giacomo Polenta | |
| 1923 | Money! Money! Money! | Mr. Carter | |
| 1923 | The Isle of Lost Ships | Captain Clark | |
| 1923 | In the Days of Daniel Boone | General Braddock | |
| 1923 | Itching Palms | Jerry's Father | |
| 1923 | Wild Bill Hickok | Gambler | |
| 1924 | Alimony | Blake | |
| 1925 | After Marriage | James Morgan | |
| 1929 | The Great Power | John Power | |
| 1930 | Fast and Loose | Judge Summers | |
| 1930 | The Royal Family of Broadway | Doctor | |
| 1931 | Corianton: A Story of Unholy Love | Laman | |
| 1931 | His Woman | Mrs. Morrisey | Uncredited |
| 1932 | The Divorce Racket | Medical Examiner | Uncredited |
| 1932 | Hey, Pop! | Contest Judge | Short, Uncredited |
| 1932 | Big Town | Banker | |
| 1933 | Hotel Variety | | |
| 1934 | War Is a Racket | The economist | |
