= The Notorious Mrs. Sands =

1920 film by Christy Cabanne

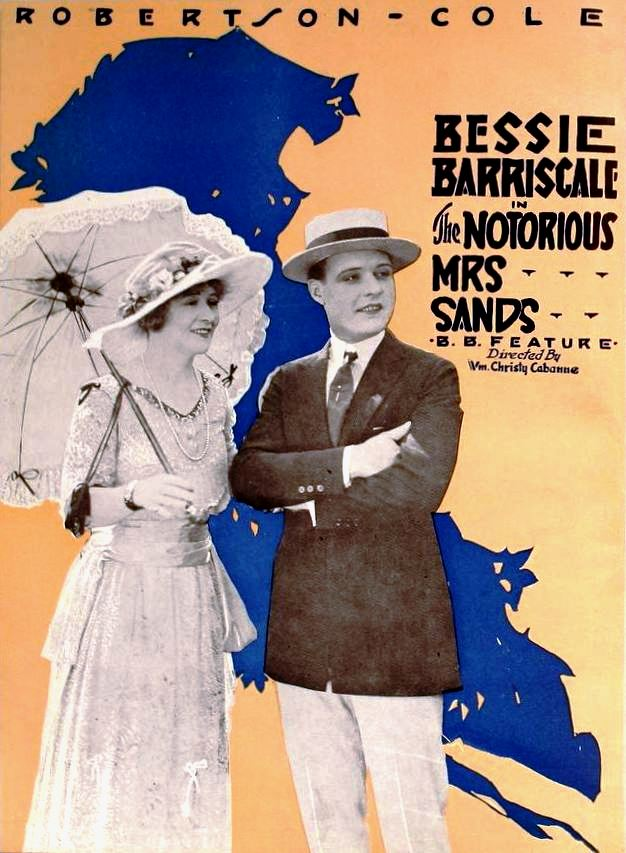
- lobby poster
- Directed by: Christy Cabanne
- Written by: Maie B. Havey
- Produced by: Bessie Barriscale
- Starring: Bessie Barriscale
- Cinematography: Eugene Gaudio
- Production company: Bessie Barriscale Productions
- Distributed by: Robertson-Cole
- Release date: May 9, 1920
- Running time: 5 reels
- Country: United States
- Language: Silent (English intertitles)

The Notorious Mrs. Sands is a 1920 American silent drama film directed by Christy Cabanne and produced by and starring Bessie Barriscale.

== Plot ==
As described in a film magazine, Mary Ware (Barriscale) and Ronald Cliffe (Stanley) become engaged. While planning their wedding, Mary discovers that her mother is indebted to Grey Sands (Myers), who desires her hand in marriage.

Feeling that her duty is to her mother, although despising Grey, Mary breaks her engagement and consents to wed the capitalist with the understanding that affection will not enter into the marriage contract. Being a loveless marriage, she is constantly ill-treated with mean tricks by her husband, who vows that he will make her love him, although he has intimate relations with another woman. He succeeds in partially compromising her with her former sweetheart, and Mary becomes known as the notorious Mrs. Sands.

After succeeding in this depraved scheme, he divorces her, and Mary returns to the man she originally loved.

== Cast ==
- Bessie Barriscale as Mary Ware
- Forrest Stanley as Ronald Cliffe
- Dorothy Cumming as Dulcie Charteris
- Harry Myers as Grey Sands (credited as Harry Meyers)
- Ben Alexander as Child

== Preservation ==
With no prints of The Notorious Mrs. Sands located in any film archives, it is considered a lost film. In October 2019, the film was cited by the National Film Preservation Board on their Lost U.S. Silent Feature Films list.
