= Tangled Threads =

Tangled Threads (aka: Broken Threads)
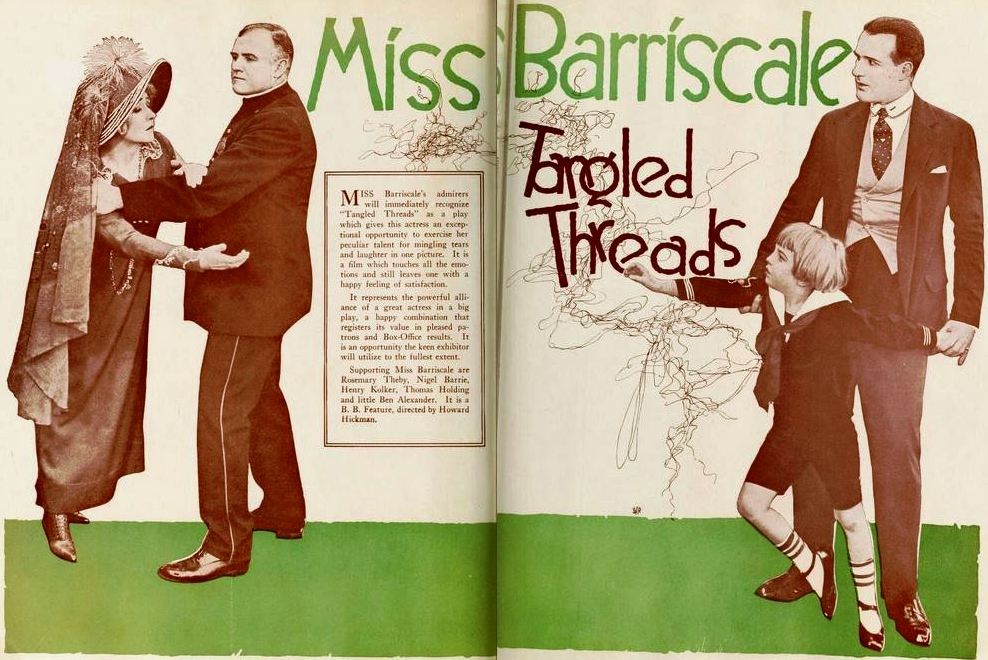
- Advertisement for Tangled Threads from a 1919 issue of The Moving Picture World
- Directed by: Howard C. Hickman
- Written by: Fred Myton; M.B. Havey (story)
- Produced by: Bessie Barriscale Productions
- Starring: Bessie Barriscale
- Cinematography: L. Guy Wilky
- Distributed by: Robertson-Cole
- Release date: June 15, 1919
- Running time: 50 mins.
- Country: USA
- Languages: Silent; English intertitles

Tangled Threads is a 1919 silent film drama directed by Howard Hickman and starring his wife Bessie Barriscale. Barriscale's production company produced the film and it was distributed by Robertson-Cole Corporation.

== Cast ==
- Bessie Barriscale - Margaret Wayne
- Rosemary Theby - Rita Kosloff
- Nigel Barrie - John Rutherford Wayne
- Henry Kolker - Dr. MacGregor
- Thomas Holding - Philip Northrop
- Ben Alexander - Sonny Boy Wayne
- Mary Jane Irving - Little Barbara

== Preservation ==
With no prints of Tangled Threads located in any film archives, it is considered a lost film. In February 2021, the film was cited by the National Film Preservation Board on their Lost U.S. Silent Feature Films list.
