= A Trick of Fate =

1919 film by Howard Hickman

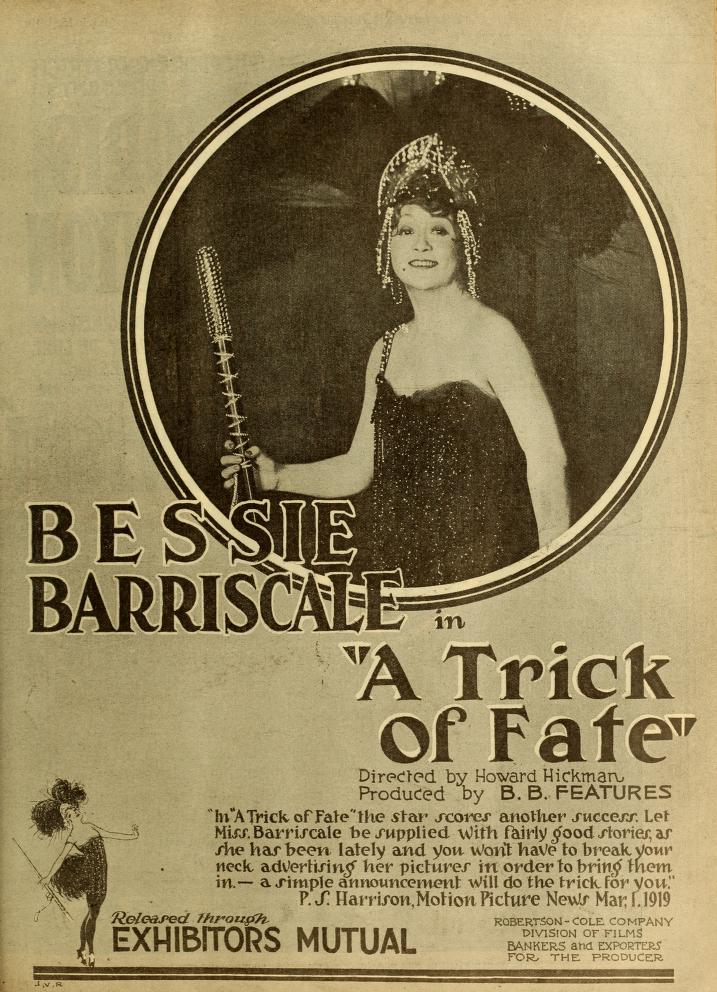
- Advertisement from a 1919 issue of The Moving Picture World
- Directed by: Howard Hickman
- Written by: Maie B. Havey; Fred Myton
- Produced by: Bessie Barriscale Features
- Starring: Bessie Barriscale
- Distributed by: Robertson-Cole
- Release date: February 24, 1919
- Running time: 5 reels
- Country: USA
- Language: Silent..English titles

A Trick of Fate is a 1919 silent film drama directed by Howard Hickman and starring Bessie Barriscale.

== Cast ==
- Bessie Barriscale - Anna Gerard/Mary Lee
- Gayne Whitman - Richard Crane (*as Alfred Whitman)
- George Field - Pierre La Rouge (as George Fields)
- Josef Swickard - Raoul Garson (*Joe Swickard)
- Joseph J. Dowling - Major Lee (*as Joe Dowling)
- Frank Whitson - John Wentworth

== Preservation ==
With no prints of A Trick of Fate located in any film archives, it is considered a lost film. In February 2021, the film was cited by the National Film Preservation Board on their Lost U.S. Silent Feature Films list.
