= Life's Twist =

1920 film by Christy Cabanne

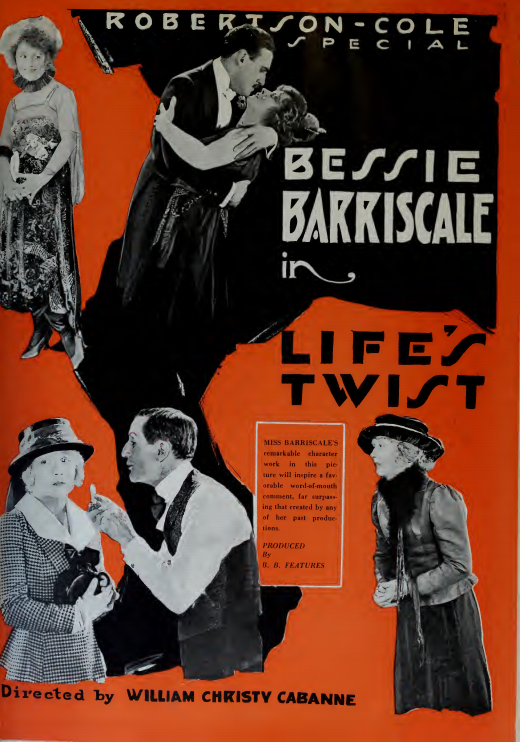
- Contemporary advertisement, originally published in Film Daily.
- Directed by: Christy Cabanne
- Written by: Thomas Edgelow (story); Harvey Gates (scenario)
- Produced by: Bessie Barriscale Productions
- Starring: Bessie Barriscale; Walter McGrail; King Baggot
- Cinematography: Eugene Gaudio
- Distributed by: Robertson-Cole Distributing Corporation
- Release date: August 11, 1920
- Running time: 6 reels
- Country: United States
- Language: Silent (English intertitles)

Life's Twist is a 1920 American silent drama film directed by Christy Cabanne with Bessie Barriscale in a dual role.

== Plot ==
As described in a film magazine, following her marriage to Steven De Koven, Muriel Chester discovers his indifference towards her and the fact that she was bargained to him for social position by her ambitious parents. Unaware that he had refused a proffered financial settlement at the same time, she repulses his attempts to be agreeable and lives in independence of his companionship. He seeks to console himself with Tina Pierce, a young woman of the slums, and establishes her in luxury to find that he cannot, after all, be interested only in the wife for whom he realizes a belated affection. Despaired of untangling their problematic existence, he decides to go abroad, only to be deterred by the forgiving and understanding wife, whom Tina had made clear the situation between them.

== Cast ==
- Bessie Barriscale as Muriel Chester / Tina Pierce
- Walter McGrail as Steven De Koven
- King Baggot as Jim Sargent
- Claire Du Brey as Mrs. Helen Sutton
- George Periolat as Mr. Boyd Chester
- Truly Shattuck as Mrs. Chester
- William V. Mong as Charlie Moye
- Marcia Manon as The Dope Fiend

== Production ==
Twenty-three sets were built for the film at a reported cost of $25,000 (not including set dressing rooms).

== Preservation ==
With no prints of Life's Twist located in any film archives, it is considered a lost film.
