= Her Purchase Price =

1919 film by Howard Hickman

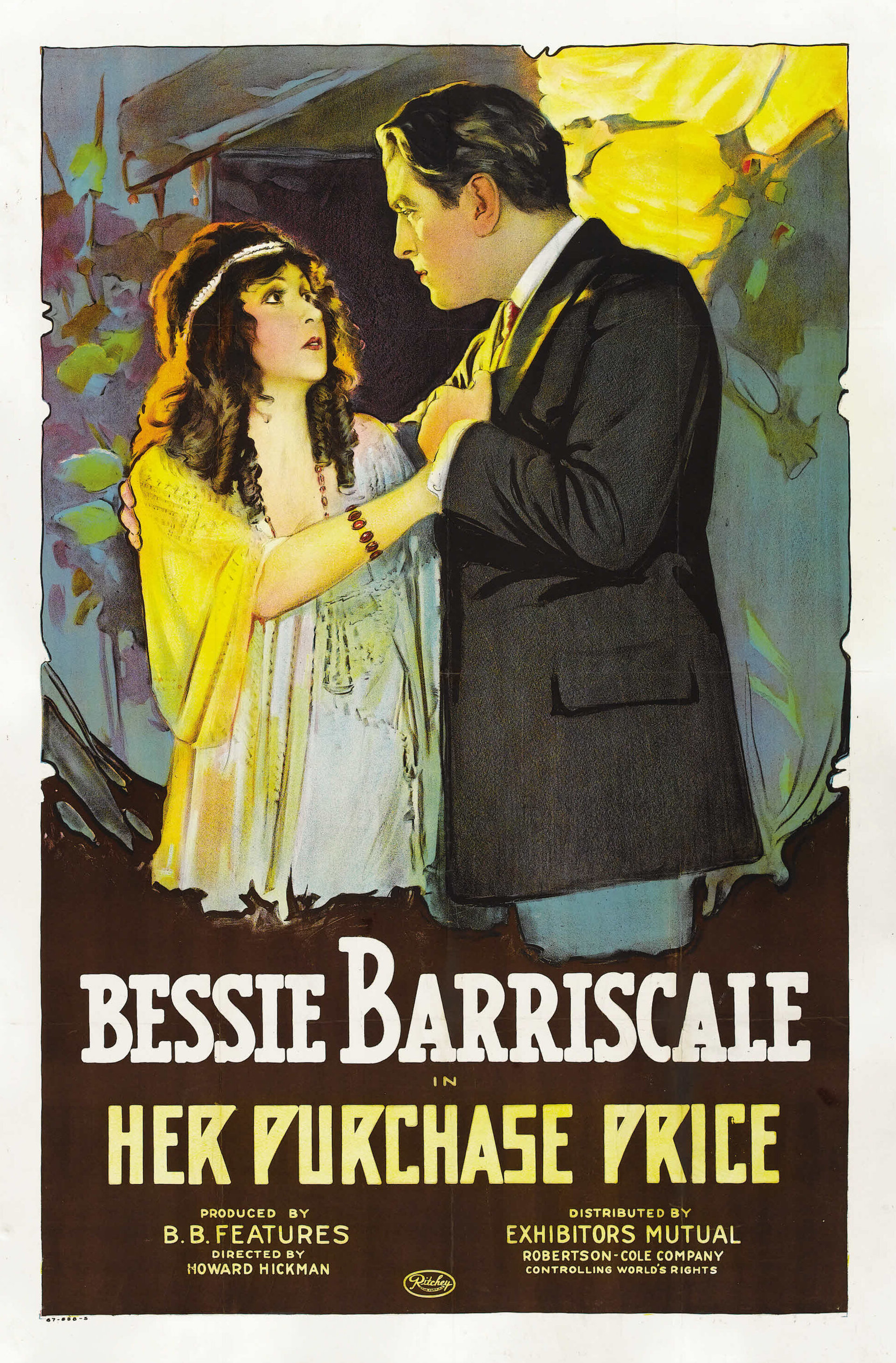
- Theatrical poster
- Directed by: Howard C. Hickman
- Written by: Maie B. Havey (story); Harvey F. Thew (scenario)
- Produced by: B&B Features
- Starring: Bessie Barriscale
- Cinematography: Gus Peterson
- Distributed by: Robertson-Cole
- Release date: September 1, 1919
- Running time: 5 reels
- Country: United States
- Language: Silent (English intertitles)

Her Purchase Price is a 1919 silent film romance distributed by newly formed Robertson-Cole. It was directed by Howard C. Hickman and starred Bessie Barriscale.

== Plot ==
As described in a film magazine, Sir Derek Anstruther (Roscoe) while touring Egypt meets the slave Sheka (Barriscale), who looks European. He learns that she has been reared by a native bandit since the massacre of her mother's caravan in the desert. He falls in love with her. When she is offered for sale on the slave block, he outbids the natives and George Vincent (Wheatcroft), a scion of a wealthy family. Sir Derek marries her and takes her back to England as his wife. George with the aid of Diana Vane, who had hoped to win Sir Derek's title, promote discord in the Anstruther household. Pressed for money, Sir Derek says he would trade anything for 10,000 pounds. Sheka goes to sell herself to a notorious roue who has made advances towards her, and Sir Derek learns of her intentions and follows. When he arrives they discover that the roue has cleared up the mystery of Sheka's parentage, and that she is his heir. Sheka happily returns with Sir Derek.

== Cast ==
- Bessie Barriscale as Sheka
- Alan Roscoe as Sir Derek Anstruther
- Joseph J. Dowling as Hamid-Al
- Kathlyn Williams as Diana Vane
- Stanhope Wheatcroft as George Vincent
- Irene Rich as Marda
- Henry Kolker as Duke of Wryden
- Wedgwood Nowell
- Una Trevelyn

== Preservation ==
With no prints of Her Purchase Price located in any film archives, it is considered a lost film. In October 2020, the film was cited by the National Film Preservation Board on their Lost U.S. Silent Feature Films list.
