= The Man in the Open =

1919 film

- Directed by: Ernest C. Warde
- Written by: Fred Myton
- Based on: A Man in the Open (novel) by Roger S. Pocock
- Produced by: United Picture Theatres of America
- Starring: Dustin Farnum
- Cinematography: Robert Newhard
- Distributed by: United Picture Theatres of America
- Release date: February 23, 1919
- Running time: 6 reels
- Country: United States
- Languages: Silent; English intertitles

The Man in the Open is a 1919 American silent Western film directed by Ernest C. Warde and starring Dustin Farnum. As an independent production, it was released on a State Rights basis. It is a lost film.

== Cast ==
- Dustin Farnum as Sailor Jesse
- Herschel Mayall as Trevor
- Lamar Johnstone as Bull Brooks
- Joseph J. Dowling as James Brown
- Claire Du Brey as Polly
- Irene Rich as Kate
