= Rosita Marstini =

French-American actress and dancer

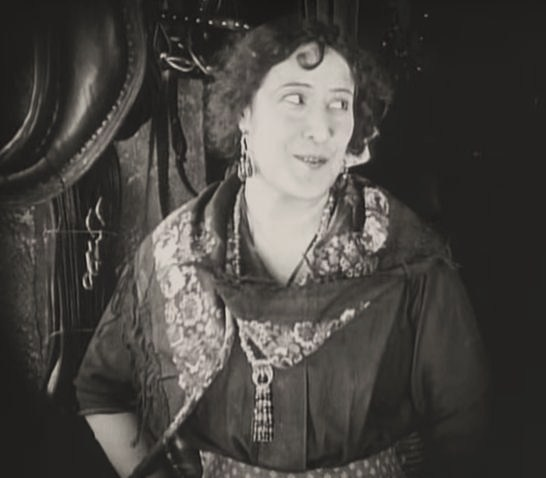
- Marstini in Blood and Sand (1922)
- Born: September 19, 1887; Nancy, Meurthe-et-Moselle, France
- Died: April 24, 1948 (aged 60); Los Angeles, California, U.S.
- Other names: Countess Rosita Marstini
- Occupation: Actress
- Years active: 1913–1948
- Spouse: Paul Slabon (m. 1913; died 1940)

Rosita Marstini (September 19, 1887 – April 24, 1948) was a French dancer, stage personality, and silent and sound film actress from Nancy, France.

== Early life ==
Rosita Marstini was born on September 19, 1887, in Nancy, France. She married Belgian actor and director Paul Sablon (1888–1940) before she came with him to the United States in 1913.

== Theatrical work in California ==
She began making movies for Universal Pictures in 1913 with her first feature being Herbert Blaché's A Prisoner in the Harem, sharing the limelight with her husband (known in the United States as Paul Bourgeois). She was known as Countess Rosita Marstini. In 1916, she debuted at the Pantages Theater in Los Angeles, California in Woman's Wits, a play by Will Wyatt. She played the Pantages' circuit for an additional eight months.

Rosita Marstini's first talking film was Hot for Paris (1929) by Raoul Walsh, with Victor McLaglen and Fifi D'Orsay. Then she contributed again to nine American films, one of her last being Holiday in Mexico (1946) by George Sidney, with Walter Pidgeon and José Iturbi.

Her final film was Casbah (1948) by John Berry, with Yvonne De Carlo and Tony Martin.

== Death ==
Marstini died on April 24, 1948, in Los Angeles, California at the age of 60, days after the release of her final film Casbah. Her husband died eight years earlier.

== Partial filmography ==
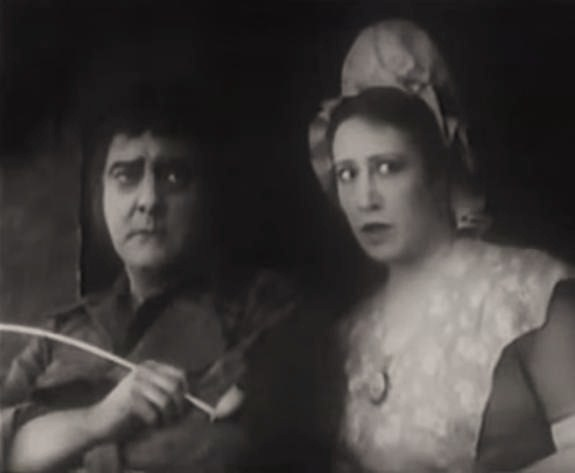
Marstini with Herschel Mayall in A Tale of Two Cities (1917)

- When Rome Ruled (1914)
- The Innocent Sinner (1917)
- The Babes in the Woods (1917)
- A Tale of Two Cities (1917)
- Madame Du Barry (1917)
- The Clever Mrs. Carfax (1917)
- The Moral Law (1918)
- Good Night, Paul (1918)
- Rosemary Climbs the Heights (1918)
- The Veiled Adventure (1919)
- Widow by Proxy (1919)
- The Luck of Geraldine Laird (1920)
- Silk Husbands and Calico Wives (1920)
- The Evil Eye (1920)
- The Outside Woman (1921)
- Blood and Sand (1922)
- Shadows of Paris (1924)
- The Redeeming Sin (1925)
- We Americans (1928)
- In Love with Life (1934)
- The Big Parade (1925)
- Flame of the Argentine (1926)
- No Other Woman (1928)
- Mexicana (1945)
- Rose of Santa Rosa (1947)
- Casbah (1948, final film role)
