= Those Who Pay =

1917 film

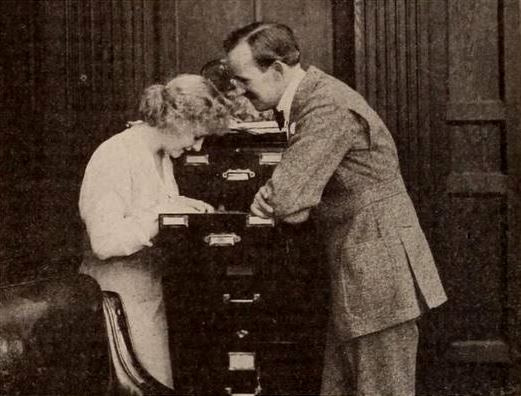
- Still from Those Who Pay with Bessie Barriscale and Howard C. Hickman from Exhibitors Herald.
- Directed by: Raymond B. West
- Written by: C. Gardner Sullivan
- Produced by: Thomas H. Ince
- Starring: Bessie Barriscale
- Cinematography: Charles Stumar
- Production companies: Thomas H. Ince Productions, Inc.
- Distributed by: U. S. Exhibitors' Booking Corp. States Rights
- Release date: December 1917
- Running time: 7 reels
- Country: United States
- Languages: Silent; English intertitles

Those Who Pay is a lost 1917 American silent drama film directed by Raymond B. West. It features Bessie Barriscale and Howard C. Hickman in the lead roles. The film had its first official screening at B.S. Moss' Broadway Theatre in New York City on December 7, 1917

== Cast ==
- Bessie Barriscale as Dorothy Warner
- Howard Hickman as George W. Graham
- Dorcas Matthews as Alice Graham
- Melbourne MacDowell as Steve McNott (credited as Melbourne McDowell)

== Preservation ==
With no prints of Those Who Pay located in any film archives, it is considered a lost film. In February of 2021, the film was cited by the National Film Preservation Board on their Lost U.S. Silent Feature Films list.
