= Josselyn's Wife (1919 film) =

1919 film by Howard Hickman

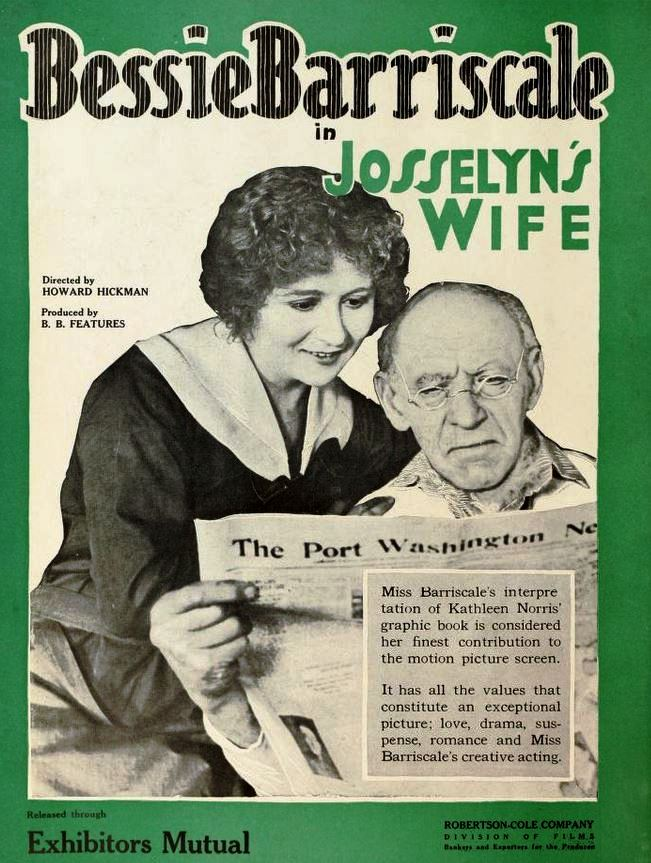
- Advertisement for Josselyn's Wife from a 1919 issue of Moving Picture World
- Directed by: Howard C. Hickman
- Written by: Fred Myton (scenario)
- Based on: Josselyn's Wife by Kathleen Norris
- Produced by: Bessie Barriscale
- Starring: Bessie Barriscale
- Cinematography: L. Guy Wilky
- Distributed by: Robertson-Cole
- Release date: May 5, 1919
- Running time: 5 reels
- Country: United States
- Language: Silent (English intertitles)

Josselyn's Wife is a 1919 American silent drama film based on a novel by Kathleen Norris. It was directed by Howard C. Hickman and starred Bessie Barriscale, Nigel Barrie, and Joseph J. Dowling. The novel was adapted to film again in 1926 with Pauline Frederick.

== Plot ==
As described in a film magazine, Ellen Latimer Josselyn (Barriscale), after the birth of her son, influences her husband Gibbs (Barrie) to forget the quarrel he had with his father (Dowling) at the time his father took a much younger woman for his wife. A happy reunion follows and Mr. and Mrs. Gibbs Josselyn go to make their home his father and stepmother. Lillian, the young stepmother, has grown tired of her society friends and sets out to make Gibbs fall in love with her. A strange coincidence leads the younger Mrs. Josselyn and older Mr. Josselyn to believe Lillian and Gibbs have been untrue to them. A violent quarrel between Gibbs and his father follows. On the next morning the elder Josselyn is found dead from a bullet wound and Gibbs is arrested. After the trial has dragged several months, Tommy (Alexander), the little grandson, tells of how he was playing "spy" on his grandfather in the early morning hours and "the gun exploded and grandfather went to sleep." The story clears Gibbs and opens up a new and happier life for the parents and son.

== Cast ==
- Bessie Barriscale as Ellen Latimer Josselyn
- Nigel Barrie as Gibbs Josselyn
- Kathleen Kirkham as Lillian Josselyn
- Joseph J. Dowling as Grandpa Latimer
- Ben Alexander as Tommy Josselyn
- Leslie Stuart as Lindsay Pepper
- Marguerite De La Motte as Lizzie
- Josephine Crowell as Aunt Elsie
- George Hackathorne as Joe Latimer
- Helen Dunbar as Mrs. Rose
- Tom Guise as Thomas Josselyn

== Preservation ==
With no prints of Josselyn's Wife located in any film archives, it is considered a lost film.
