= Two-Gun Betty =

1918 film

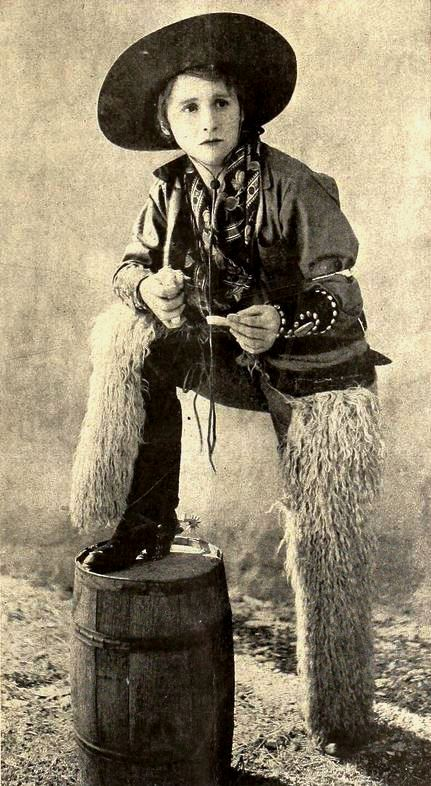
- Barriscale in Two-Gun Betty from a 1919 issue of Film Fun
- Directed by: Howard C. Hickman
- Written by: Jack Cunningham
- Produced by: Robert Brunton
- Starring: Bessie Barriscale
- Cinematography: L. Guy Wilky
- Distributed by: W. W. Hodkinson Corporation; Pathé Exchange
- Release date: December 16, 1918
- Running time: 5 reels
- Country: United States
- Languages: Silent; English intertitles

Two-Gun Betty is a 1918 American comedy Western film directed by Howard C. Hickman and starring Bessie Barriscale. It was produced by Robert Brunton and distributed by Pathé Exchange.

== Plot ==
Betty, a determined young woman, wants to be a cowboy. She discovers if she disguises herself as a man, she can work on a ranch. The other cowhands, however, discover her ruse and trick her into embarrassing situations.

== Cast ==
- Bessie Barriscale as Betty Craig
- Lee Shumway as Jack Kennedy (credited as L. C. Shumway)
- Katherine Van Buren as Ethel Roberts (credited as Catherine Van Buren)
- Helen Hawley as Florence Kennedy
- Laura Oakley as Miss Ambrose
- Albert R. Cody as Mushy (credited as Albert Cody)
- Richard Wayne as Irish Dave
- William Ellingford as Billy Yeaman
- C. M. Carlos as Carlos
- George Routh as Miguel Carballo

== Preservation ==
With no prints of Two-Gun Betty located in any film archives, it is considered a lost film.
