= Ben Alexander (actor) =

American actor (1911–1969)

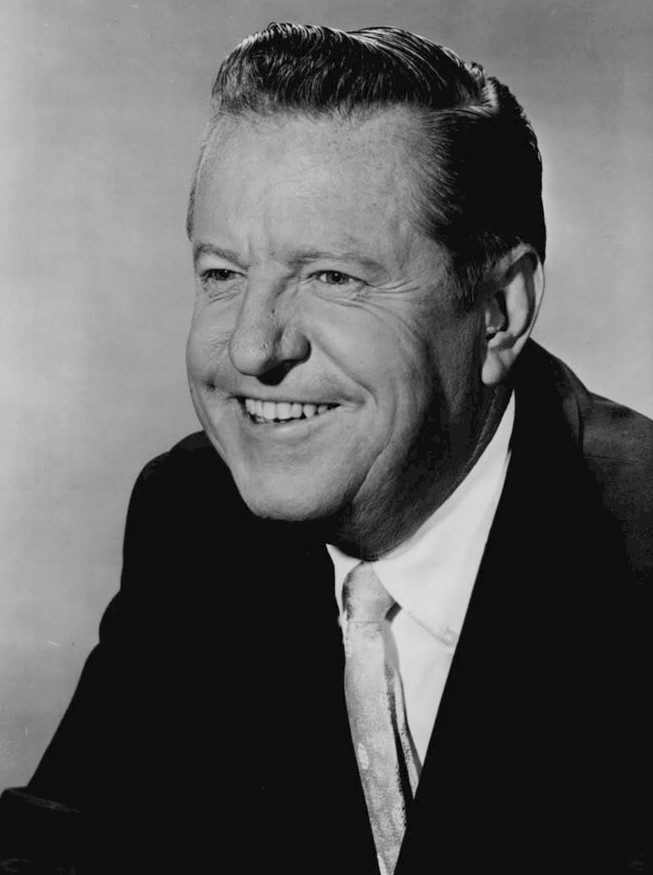
- Alexander in 1959
- Born: Nicholas Benton Alexander III; June 27, 1911; Goldfield, Nevada, U.S.
- Died: July 5, 1969 (aged 58); Westchester, California, U.S.
- Education: Stanford University
- Occupation: Actor
- Years active: 1916–1969
- Spouse: Lesley Smith (m. 1950)

Nicholas Benton Alexander III (June 27, 1911 – July 5, 1969) was an American motion picture actor, who started out as a child actor in 1916. He is best remembered for his role as Officer Frank Smith in the Dragnet franchise.

== Early life and career ==
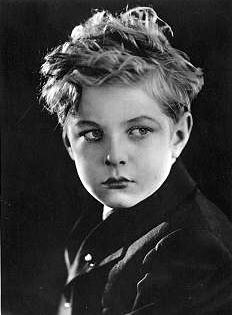
Ben Alexander as a child actor

A native of Goldfield, Nevada, Alexander was the son of Nicholas Benton Alexander Jr. and Elizabeth Hinkley.

After a number of silent films, he retired from screen work, but came back for the World War I classic, All Quiet on the Western Front (1930), in which Alexander received good notices as an adult actor as "Kemmerich", the tragic amputation victim. Earnings from the film allowed him to attend Stanford University; however, three years later, in the midst of the Great Depression, he was forced to leave school for lack of funds.

He found a new career as a successful radio announcer in the late 1940s, including a stint on The Martin and Lewis Show. Alexander also acted on radio, playing Philip West in the 1939–40 soap opera Brenthouse on the Blue Network.

From October 1950 to January 1951, Alexander hosted Party Time at Club Roma, a nightly late-night television show on NBC described as "part Truth or Consequences-type stunt show and part talent contest".

In 1952, Jack Webb, actor-producer-director of Dragnet, needed a replacement for Barton Yarborough, who had played Detective Romero opposite Webb's Sgt. Joe Friday. Webb selected Alexander, but had to wait until he was available. A few actors filled in as Friday's partners until Alexander appeared in the newly created role of Officer Frank Smith, first in the radio series, then reprised the role in film and on television. The popular series ran until 1959. When Webb revived it in 1966, he wanted Alexander to rejoin him, but Alexander had just signed to play the role of Sgt. Dan Briggs on the weekly ABC series Felony Squad.

== Other ==
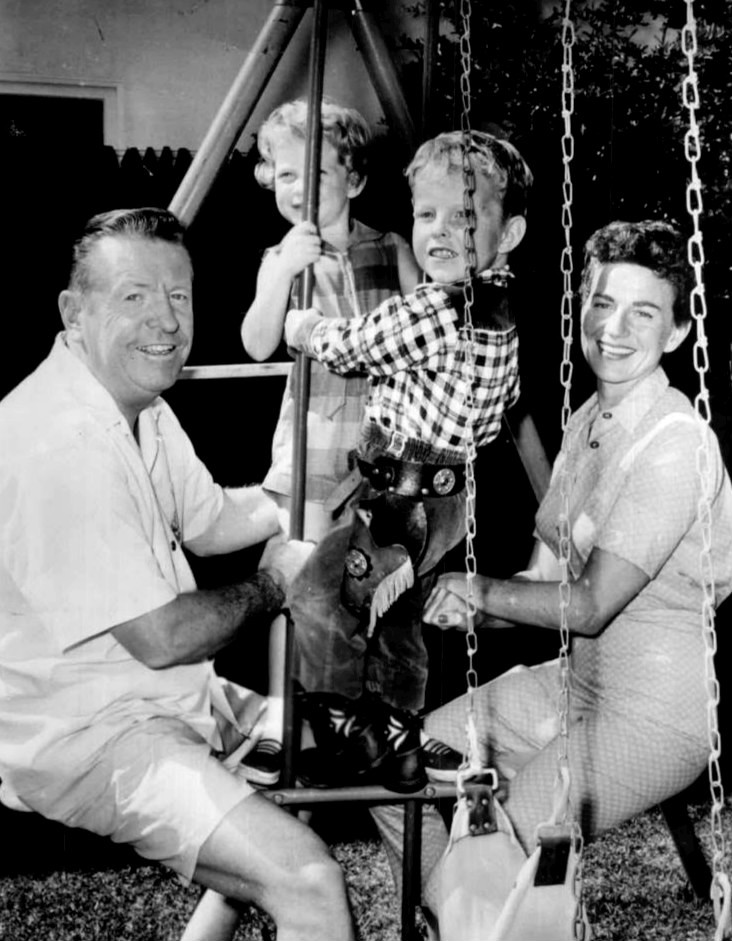
Alexander and his family in 1961, pictured are his daughter, Lesley, his son, Bradford, and his wife, Lesley.

Alexander owned and operated the Ben Alexander Ford car dealership in the Highland Park neighborhood of northeast Los Angeles, from around 1953 until his death in 1969, along with the Ben Alexander Ford car dealership in San Francisco, which was formed in 1959.

In the mid-1950s, Ben Alexander's Dream House Motel was located in Hollywood, near the corner of Yucca Street and Cahuenga Boulevard.

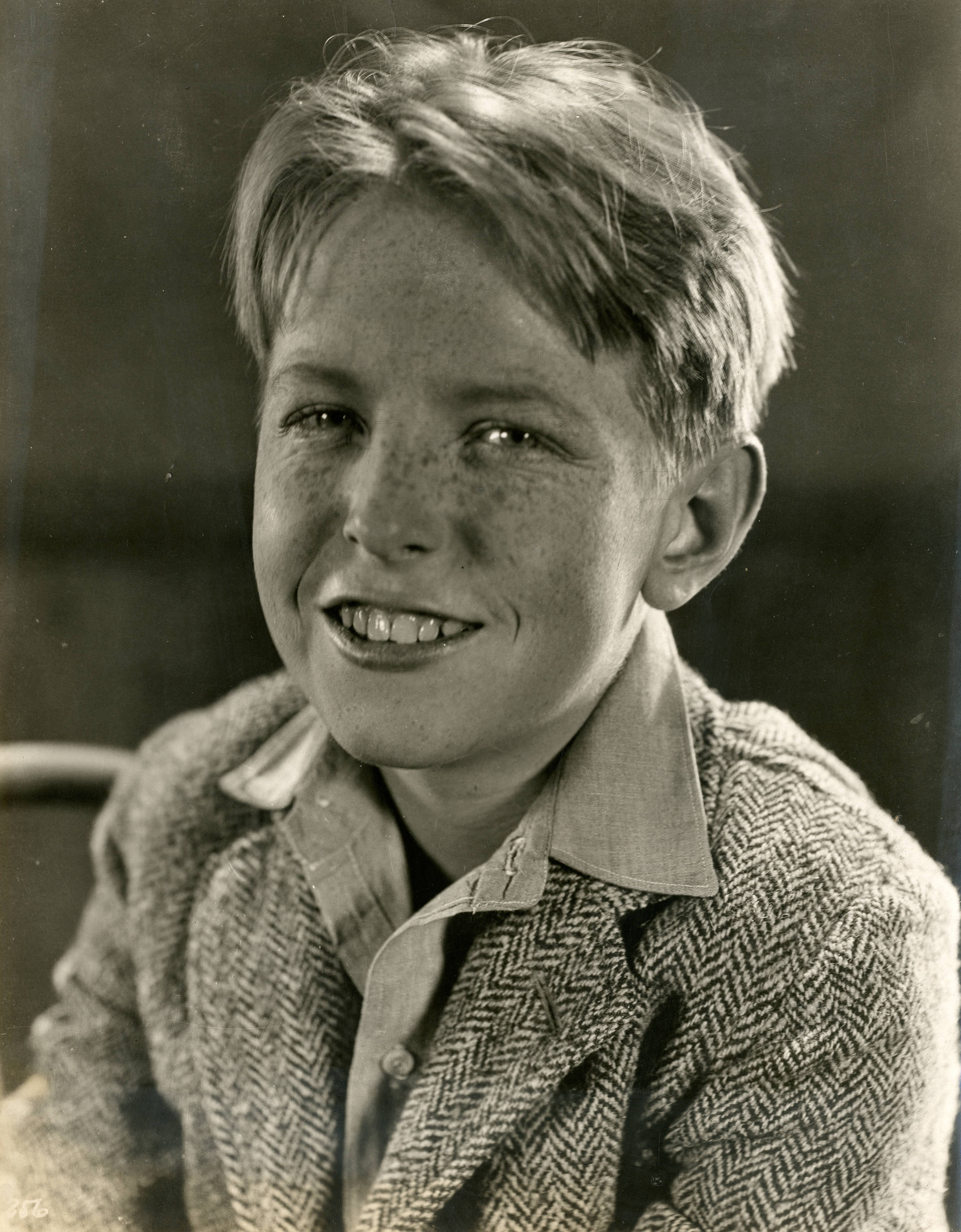
Ben Alexander in 1925

In 1960, Alexander was a semi-regular panelist on Ernie Kovacs' offbeat game show Take a Good Look, which he affectionately dubbed "as unrigged and unrehearsed and un-produced a show as ever hit the air.'" On April 19, 1960, and for roughly four years thereafter, he produced and hosted The Ben Alexander Show, a talent show airing on Oakland's KTVU TV. What made this program especially noteworthy—and profitable for its creator/host—was that Alexander was also the sponsor, via his auto dealership. Broadcast Magazine highlighted this seeming anomaly in its August 29 issue, exactly four months after the show's debut.

When a successful actor is also a successful businessman, that's unusual. When, as a businessman, he sponsors himself as a tv performer, that's rare. And when, the day after the opening broadcast, his business does three times its normal volume, that's news.

== Death ==
On July 5, 1969, Alexander was found dead as the result of a massive heart attack in his Los Angeles home when his wife and children returned from a camping trip.

He was cremated.

For his contributions to the entertainment industry, Ben Alexander was awarded three stars on the Hollywood Walk of Fame for television, radio, and movies.

== Filmography ==
- Each Pearl a Tear (1916)
- The Little American (1917) - Bobby Moore
- What Money Can't Buy (1918) - Child
- Hearts of the World (1918) - The Boy's Littlest Brother
- The Lady of the Dugout (1918) - The Lady's Son
- The Heart of Rachael (1918) - Jim
- The One Woman (1918) - Boy
- Little Orphant Annie (1918) - Orphan
- The Turn in the Road (1919) - Bob
- The White Heather (1919) - Donald Cameron
- Josselyn's Wife (1919) - Tommy Josselyn
- The Hushed Hour (1919) - Gondy
- The Mayor of Filbert (1919) - Carroll
- Tangled Threads (1919) - 'Sonny Boy' Wayne
- The Better Wife (1919) - Little Dick
- The Triflers (1920) - Rupert Holbrook
- The Family Honor (1920) - Little Ben Tucker
- The Notorious Mrs. Sands (1920) - Child
- Through Eyes of Men (1920) - Little Billy
- Blue Streak McCoy (1920)
- The Heart Line (1921) - The Child
- In the Name of the Law (1922) - Harry O'Hara - age 9, prologue
- Penrod and Sam (1923) - Penrod Schofield
- The Yankee Spirit (1923, Short)
- Jealous Husbands (1923) - Bobbie (later called Spud)
- Boy of Mine (1923) - Bill Latimer
- Barnum Junior (1924, Short)
- Junior Partner (1924, Short)
- A Self-Made Failure (1924) - Sonny
- Dirty Hand (1924, Short)
- Flaming Love (1925) - Benny Keene
- Pampered Youth (1925) - George Minafer, as a child
- Wildcat Willie (1925, Short)
- The Shining Adventure (1925) - Benny
- The Highbinders (1926) - Roy Marshall
- Scotty of the Scouts (1926) - Scotty Smith
- Fighting for Fame (1927) - Danny Ryan
- Two to One (1927)
- The Divine Lady (1929) - Young Lieutenant (uncredited)
- The Lunkhead (1929, Short) - Ben - Billy's Chum
- All Quiet on the Western Front (1930) - Franz Kemmerich
- Many a Slip (1931) - Ted Coster
- It's a Wise Child (1931) - Bill Stanton
- Are These Our Children (1931) - Nicholas 'Nick' Crosby
- Suicide Fleet (1931) - Kid
- A Wise Child (1931)
- Mystery Ship (1931)
- High Pressure (1932) - Geoffrey Weston
- The Wet Parade (1932) - Evelyn's Friend (uncredited)
- Tom Brown of Culver (1932) - Cpl. John Clarke
- The Vanishing Frontier (1932) - Lucien Winfield
- Alias the Professor (1933, Short)
- Mister Mugg (1933, Short)
- Roadhouse Queen (1933, Short) - Junior Knox
- Daddy Knows Best (1933, Short) - Billy Todd
- What Price Innocence? (1933) - Tommy Harrow
- This Day and Age (1933) - Morry Dover
- Stage Mother (1933) - Francis Nolan
- Once to Every Woman (1934) - Joe
- The Most Precious Thing in Life (1934) - Gideon 'Gubby' Gerhart
- The Life of Vergie Winters (1934) - Barry Preston
- Flirtation (1934) - Dudley
- Grand Old Girl (1935) - Tom Miller
- Born to Gamble (1935) - Paul Mathews
- Reckless Roads (1935) - Wade Adams
- Annapolis Farewell (1935) - Adams
- Splendor (1935) - Western Union Messenger (uncredited)
- The Fire Trap (1935) - Bob Fender
- Hearts in Bondage (1936) - Eggleston
- Red Lights Ahead (1936) - George Wallace
- Shall We Dance (1937) - Evans - a Bandleader (uncredited)
- The Legion of Missing Men (1937) - Don Carter
- The Outer Gate (1937) - Bob Terry
- Western Gold (1937) - Bart
- The Life of the Party (1937) - Orchestra Leader (uncredited)
- The Spy Ring (1938) - Capt. Don Mayhew
- Russian Dressing (1938, Short) - Band Leader Bill Farraday
- Mr. Doodle Kicks Off (1938) - Larry Weldon
- Convict's Code (1939) - Jeff Palmer
- Buries Alive (1939) - Riley
- The Leather Pushers (1940) - Dan Brown, Announcer
- Criminals Within (1941) - Sgt. Paul, the Traitor
- Dragnet (1954) - Officer Frank Smith
- Man in the Shadow (1957) - Ab Begley

=== Television ===
- Party Time at Club Roma (1950–1951) - Host
- Dragnet (regular, 1952–1959) - Officer Frank Smith
- The Joseph Cotten Show, also known as On Trial (1 episode, 1957)
- The Ford Show, Starring Tennessee Ernie Ford (January 24, 1957)
- Take A Good Look (Semi-regular 1959–1960) - Himself / Panelist
- About Faces (1960–1961) - Himself - Host
- Batman (1 episode, 1966) - Detective Beside Trash Can
- Felony Squad (Unknown episodes, 1966–1969) - Desk Sgt. Dan Briggs
- Judd, for the Defense (1 episode, 1969)

=== Writer ===
- Dragnet (Co-writer, 6 episodes)
