= Bessie Barriscale =

American actress (1884–1965)

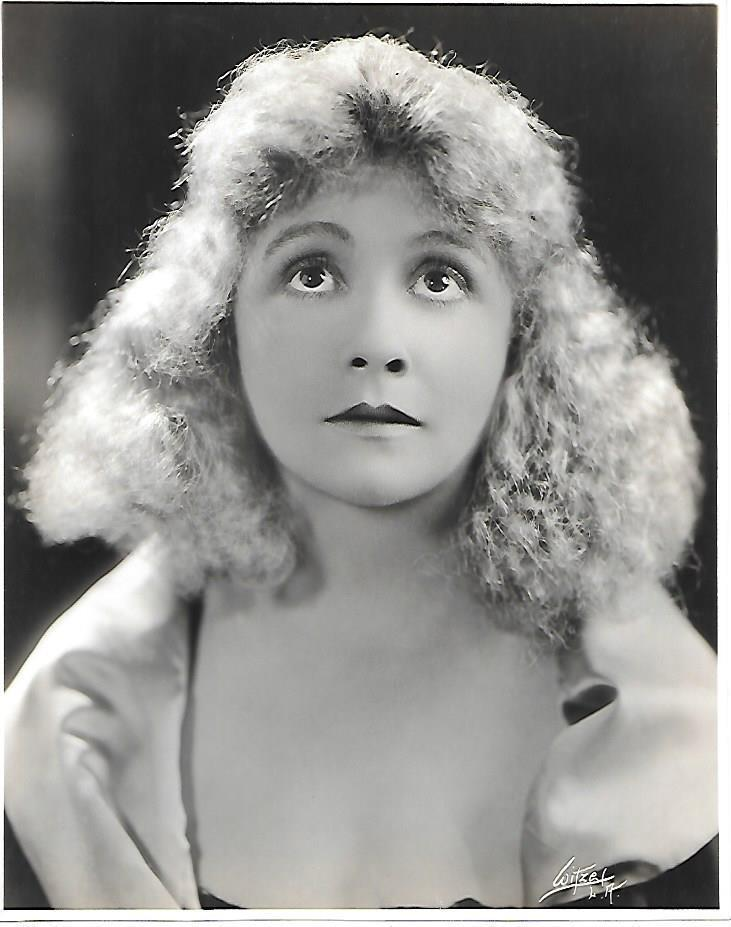
- Barriscale in 1918
- Born: Elizabeth Mary Barriscale; June 9, 1884; New York City, New York, U.S.
- Died: June 30, 1965 (aged 81); Kentfield, California, U.S.
- Resting place: Mount Tamalpais Cemetery
- Other name: Lizzie Barriscale
- Occupation: Actress
- Years active: 1896–1934
- Spouses: Sumner Gard (m. 1902; div. 1906) Howard C. Hickman (m. 1906; died 1949)
- Children: 1
- Relatives: Anna Taliaferro (aunt); Mabel Taliaferro; Edith Taliaferro (cousins)

Bessie Barriscale (born Elizabeth Mary Barriscale; June 9, 1884 – June 30, 1965) was an American actress who gained fame on the stage and in silent films.

== Early life ==
Barriscale was born in New York City to Samuel Barriscale, an England-born immigrant of Irish parentage, and Jenevieve Spaulding from Ireland. Her father's occupation was elevated railroad car conductor in 1900. Later motion picture publicity had her father coming to the United States with a London company that presented The Lights of London.

As a child she went by "Lizzie Barriscale", the name under which her first stage performances were credited. Barriscale was the eldest of five children; a younger brother, Charles Barriscale, also went on stage. For both, the propelling impetus for acting was their paternal aunt, Anna Barriscale Taliaferro, whose daughters Mabel and Edith Taliaferro were actresses. Anna Taliaferro was the founder of the first casting agency for theatrical children, to whom stage producers looked for young performers.

=== Origin controversies ===
According to one source, Barriscale was born Elizabeth Barry Scale in Hoboken, New Jersey, to Irish immigrants from County Cork.

The 1900 US Census says she was born in England during May 1886, the same year her parents immigrated to America. That birthdate agrees with one of her early notices from May 1897, but not the birthplace. Later censuses report New York as a birthplace, with ages that suggests an 1884 birthdate. Her obituary says she was a New York City native, and cites her age at death as 81.

== Career ==
=== Early stage performances ===
Barriscale's first verifiable performance was an 1896 tour of Shore Acres with James A. Herne. She played Mary Berry, while her younger cousin Edith Taliaferro played Millie Berry. At Chicago in early May 1897, a brief profile on the children of that tour described Lizzie Barriscale as "nearly 11 years old", with a "beautiful soprano voice". It went on to say she started on stage "as a comic opera cherub" who could sing all of the prima donna's songs. An article on stage children from December 1899 mentioned Lizzie Barriscale as among the best-known of young performers, and included a photo of her indicating she was with the James Kidder Hanford Company. Her first known credit as Bessie Barriscale comes from a poorly received 1901 stock company performance of The Widow Bedott, for which she was the only actress praised.

During spring 1902 Barriscale was the Proctor Stock Company's ingenue at the Fifth Avenue Theatre in New York. While performing The Rift Within Love's Cloud, a one-act comedy by F. Clifford Smith, during late March and early April, she met actor Sumner Gard, also in the play. On April 30, 1902, they were married in Manhattan. She did not tell her parents until January 1, 1903. For a while they toured together with Proctor, but during summer 1902 Barriscale joined another tour playing In Old Kentucky, which would last two years.

That was followed by two years as Lovey Mary in Mrs. Wiggs of the Cabbage Patch. She became leading woman with the Belasco Stock Company in Los Angeles after performing for a year in Belasco's Rose of the Rancho. She went on to portray Luna in The Bird of Paradise and to have the lead in We Are Seven.

Barriscale filed for divorce in Chicago during 1906, saying her husband never wrote to her when they were apart. She then married another actor, Howard C. Hickman, in Manhattan on October 17, 1906.

=== Film and later stage work ===
Barriscale began her film career in 1913, debuting on-screen in Lasky Picture Company's Rose of the Rancho. She worked intensively for New York Motion Picture Company and Triangle Film Corporation (among other studios) until she announced her retirement in the early 1930s. In 1917, she had her own production company, the Bessie Barriscale Feature Company. Barriscale announced the formation at a news conference on May 1, 1917. Plans called for the company to produce six to eight features each year. Another new company, Paralta Plays, was designated to distribute the films. James Young was hired as one of three directors for Barriscale's new company.

In 1918, Barriscale was contracted by J.L. Frothingham of B.B. Features and the Roberson Cole Company to make 16 films. B.B. Features was an Arizona corporation. The movies were to be completed, produced, and delivered by January 21, 1921. At this time, Miss Barriscale's managers insured her life for a half million dollars against eventualities. The total cost of the features totaled more than $1,000,000.

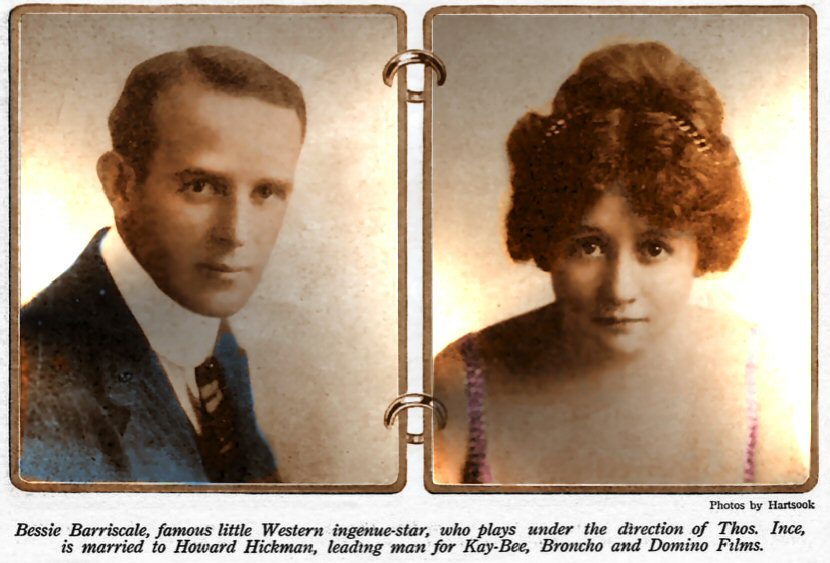
Barriscale and her husband Howard Hickman, 1915

Barriscale was enthusiastic about William Shakespeare and wanted to bring one of his plays to the screen. The actress was also an excellent swimmer. In The Woman Michael Married (1919), she was featured in a movie adapted from a novel by Annette Kellermann. Barriscale went so far as to hire a swimming and diving instructor and took lessons in Venice, California. A 90-foot pool was constructed at Brunton Studios where the scenes were shot. The film was directed by Henry Kolker.

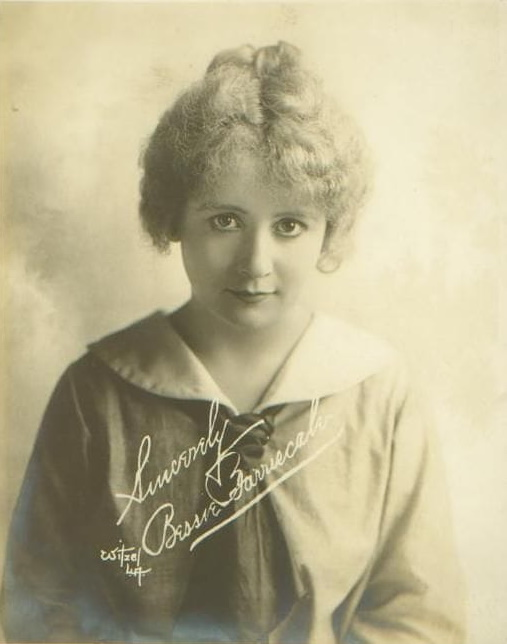
Barriscale in 1916

In 1919, she traveled with her husband—actor, director, and film producer—Howard C. Hickman and their small son on a world tour. They anticipated producing motion pictures during their journey and traveled with a cameraman.

In 1921, Barriscale came east to play in The Skirt. The play was to travel to Philadelphia and Boston after opening in Washington, D.C.. Later the production appeared in New York City. In prior years, Barriscale participated in plays for the Belasco Theater in Los Angeles and once appeared in Belasco productions, notably Bird of Paradise written by Richard Walton Tully. She played a princess named Luana. During the early years, Barriscale was in vaudeville, with two-a-day, three-a-day, and even four-a-day performances not uncommon.

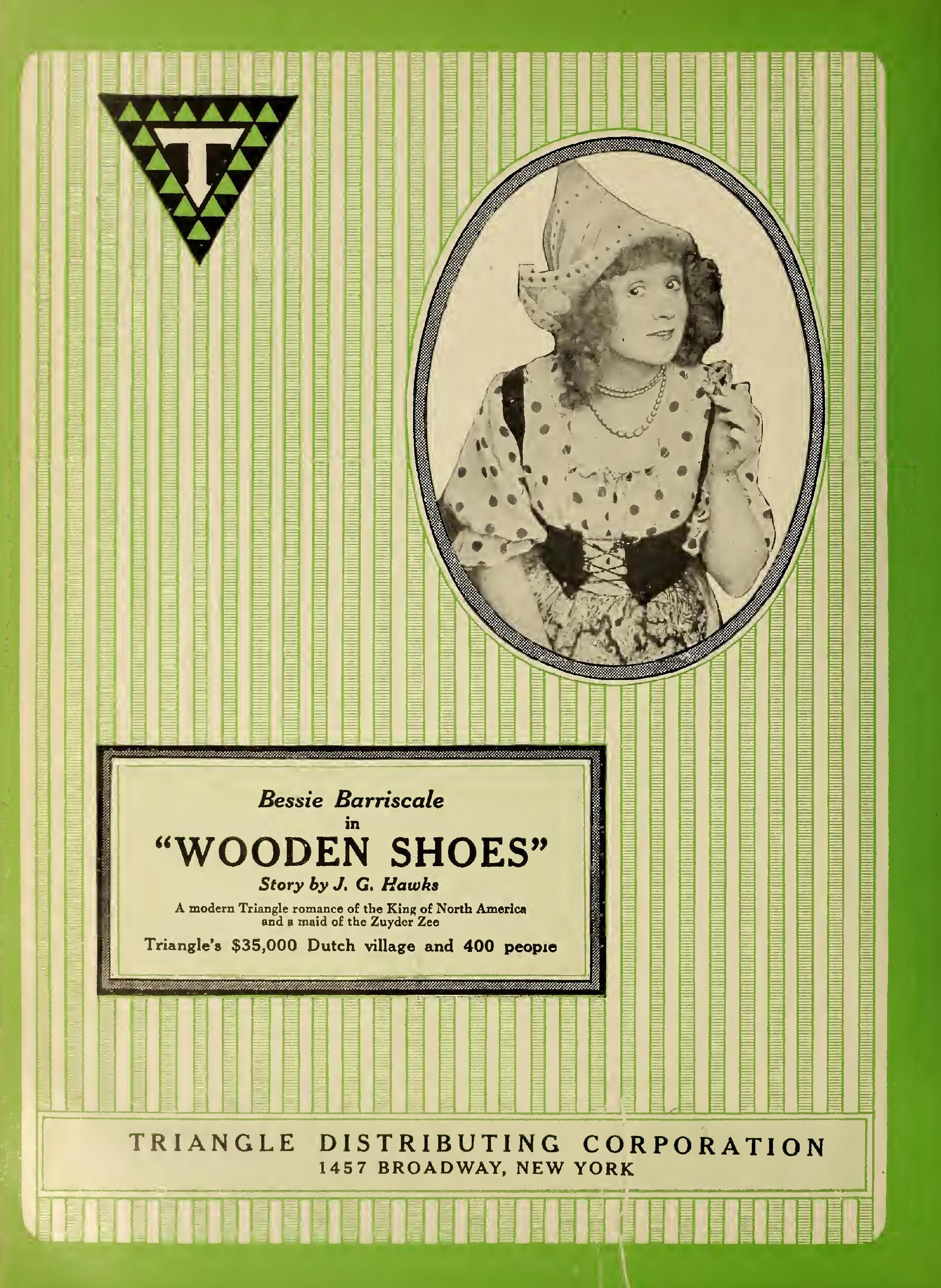
Wooden Shoes ad in Motion Picture News, 1917

Actor Jackie Coogan and his parents purchased the home of Bessie Barriscale in Pellisier Square, Los Angeles in February 1922. The residence was valued at $45,000.

Barriscale returned to the stage in Women Go On Forever. She had been married 21 years and had a son age 20 at this time. The production opened at the Hollywood Music Box in March 1928. She played a "housewife type," and confessed to having rehearsed for the role in a gingham dress she took from the wardrobe of her home in Santa Monica, California. Her feet were slightly smaller than her shoes. She said she had been working at home for several years and had just learned to cook.

== Death ==
Barriscale died in Kentfield, California on June 30, 1965. She is interred next to her husband, Howard C. Hickman, at the Mount Tamalpais Cemetery in San Rafael, California.

== Honors ==
For her contributions to the film industry, Barriscale received a motion pictures star on the Hollywood Walk of Fame in 1960. Her star is located at 6652 Hollywood Boulevard.

== Filmography ==
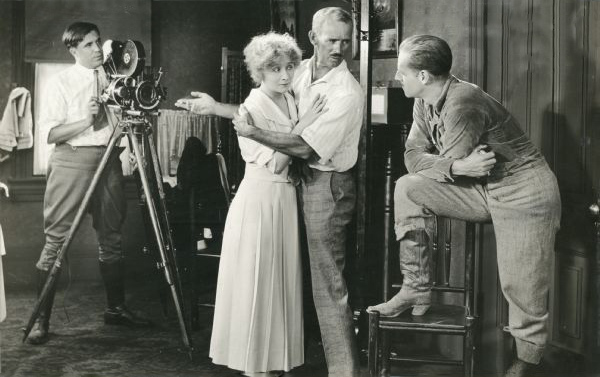
Original caption: "Howard C. Hickman, husband and director of Bessie Barriscale, shows leading man Jack Holt how to make love to Mrs. Hickman." This appears to be a production still from Kitty Kelly, M.D. (1919). If so, the cameraman behind the Bell & Howell model 2709 is Eugene Gaudio.

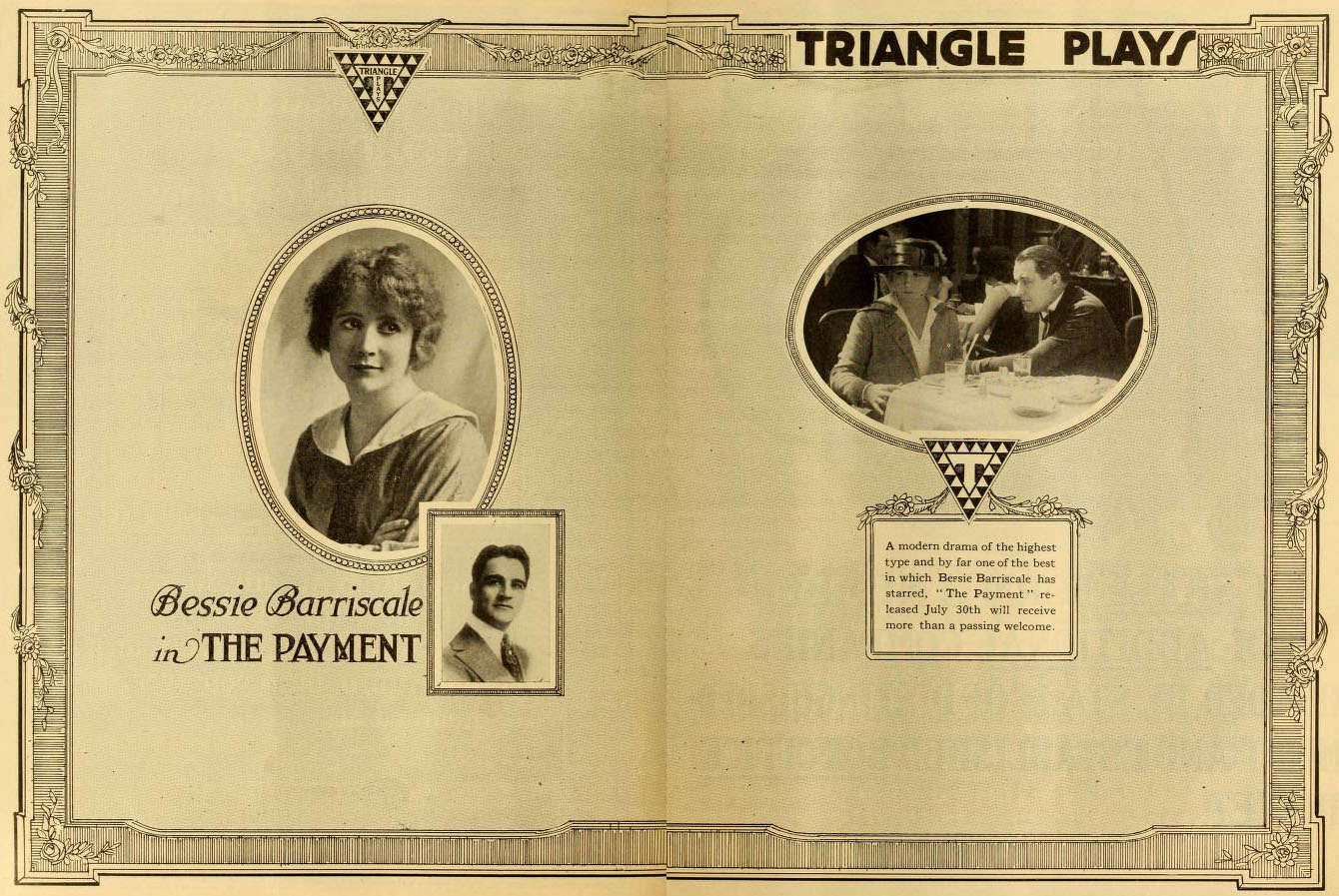
The Payment (1916)

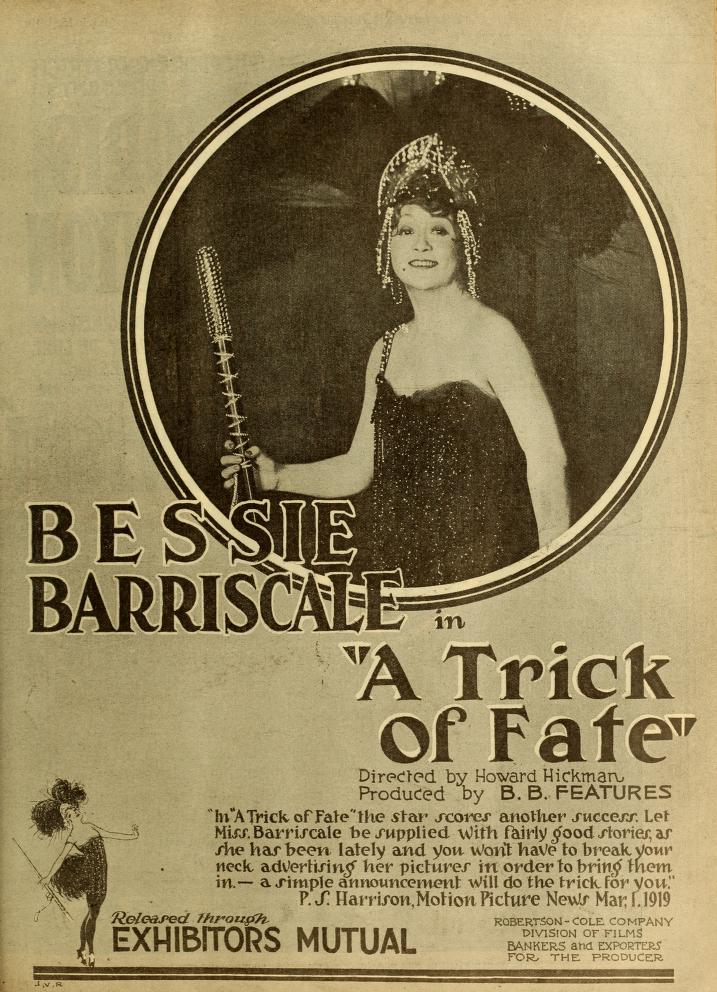
A Trick of Fate (1919)

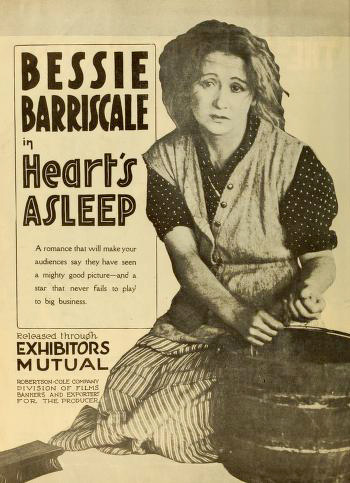
Heart's Asleep (1919)

- The Gambler's Pal (1913), short
- Eileen of Erin (1913), short
- The Bells of Austi (1914), short
- The Making of Bobby Burnit (1914), short
- Ready Money (1914)
- Rose of the Rancho (1914)
- The Devil (1915)
- The Cup of Life (1915)
- The Reward (1915) 40 minutes
- The Mating (1915)
- The Golden Claw (1915)
- The Painted Soul (1915)
- The Green Swamp (1916)
- Honor's Altar (1916)
- Bullets and Brown Eyes (1916)
- The Last Act (1916)
- Not My Sister (1916)
- The Sorrows of Love (1916)
- The Payment (1916)
- Home (1916)
- Plain Jane (1916)
- A Corner in Colleens (1916)
- The Snarl (1917)
- Bawbs o' the Blue Ridge (1917)
- The Hater of Men (1917)
- Borrowed Plumage (1917)
- Wooden Shoes (1917)
- Those Who Pay (1917)
- Madam Who? (1918)
- The Cast-Off (1918)
- Within the Cup (1918)
- Blindfolded (1918)
- Rose o' Paradise (1918)
- Patriotism (1918)
- Maid o' the Storm (1918)
- The White Lie (1918)
- The Heart of Rachael (1918), also producer
- Two-Gun Betty (1918)
- All of a Sudden Norma (1919)
- A Trick of Fate (1919), also producer
- Hearts Asleep (1919), also producer
- Josselyn's Wife (1919), also producer
- Tangled Threads (1919), also producer
- The Woman Michael Married (1919), also producer
- Her Purchase Price (1919), also producer
- Kitty Kelly, M.D. (1919), also producer
- Beckoning Roads (1919), also producer
- The Luck of Geraldine Laird (1920), also producer
- A Woman Who Understood (1920)
- The Notorious Mrs. Sands (1920), also producer
- Life's Twist (1920), also producer
- The Broken Gate (1920)
- The Breaking Point (1921)
- Show Folks (1928)
- Secrets (1933)
- Bondage (1933)
- Above the Clouds (1933)
- Beloved (1934)
- The Man Who Reclaimed His Head (1934)
