= The Cup of Life (1915 film) =

1915 film by Thomas H. Ince

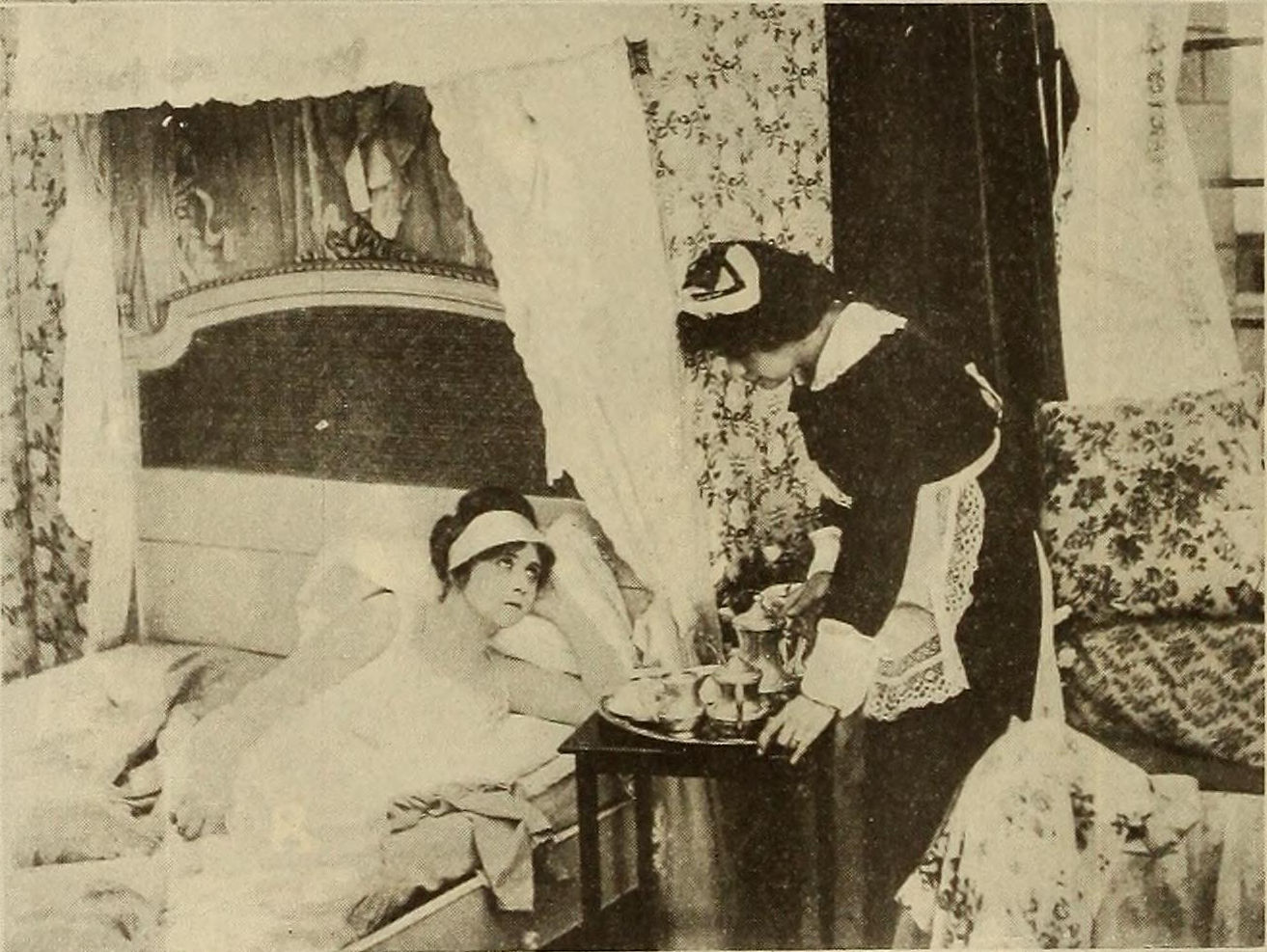
- Bessie Barriscale in a publicity still
- Directed by: Thomas H. Ince; Raymond B. West
- Written by: C. Gardner Sullivan; Thomas H. Ince
- Produced by: Thomas H. Ince
- Starring: Bessie Barriscale; Enid Markey; Charles Ray
- Production company: New York Motion Pictures
- Distributed by: Mutual Film
- Release date: April 26, 1915
- Running time: 50 minutes
- Country: United States
- Languages: Silent; English intertitles

The Cup of Life is a 1915 American silent film. It is a drama film which was directed by Thomas H. Ince and Raymond B. West, with a scenario written by C. Gardner Sullivan and Thomas Ince. Though Thomas Ince produced both films, this film is unrelated to The Cup of Life (1921 film).

The film is about the lives of two sisters (played by Bessie Barriscale and Enid Markey) who choose different paths in life.

== Plot summary ==
As described in contemporary film magazines, sisters Helen and Ruth Fiske are living a humble life on their department-store salaries. Helen dreams of an easy life of luxury and Ruth dreams of a simple, but contended domestic life. Helen takes up with the wealthy John Ward, despite Ruth's doubts. Ruth marries a man of modest means and they build a solid household. Helen begins circulating among men of the monied class.

After some years, Ruth is now a mother and runs a happy household. Helen has been abroad, but her position in high society is waning as she ages. Helen returns to America to win back a former suitor, James Kellerman, but he has moved on to a younger, less jaded woman. The sisters are reunited, but seeing her sister's dream fulfilled depresses Helen further and she proceeds further down a path of dissipation.

== Cast ==
- Bessie Barriscale as Helen Fiske
- Enid Markey as Ruth Fiske
- Charles Ray as John Ward
- Frank Borzage as Dick Ralston
- Arthur Maude as Jack Jordan
- J. Barney Sherry as James Kellerman
- Louise Glaum as Irene Bullard
- Harry Keenan as John Standing
- Howard Hickman as Higsby
- Jerome Storm as Sam Dugan, credited as Jerry Storm

== Preservation ==
Complete prints of the 1915 film, The Cup of Life, are held by the Library of Congress, as well as the Cineteca Del Friuli in Gemona.
