= Eugene Gaudio =

Italian cinematographer

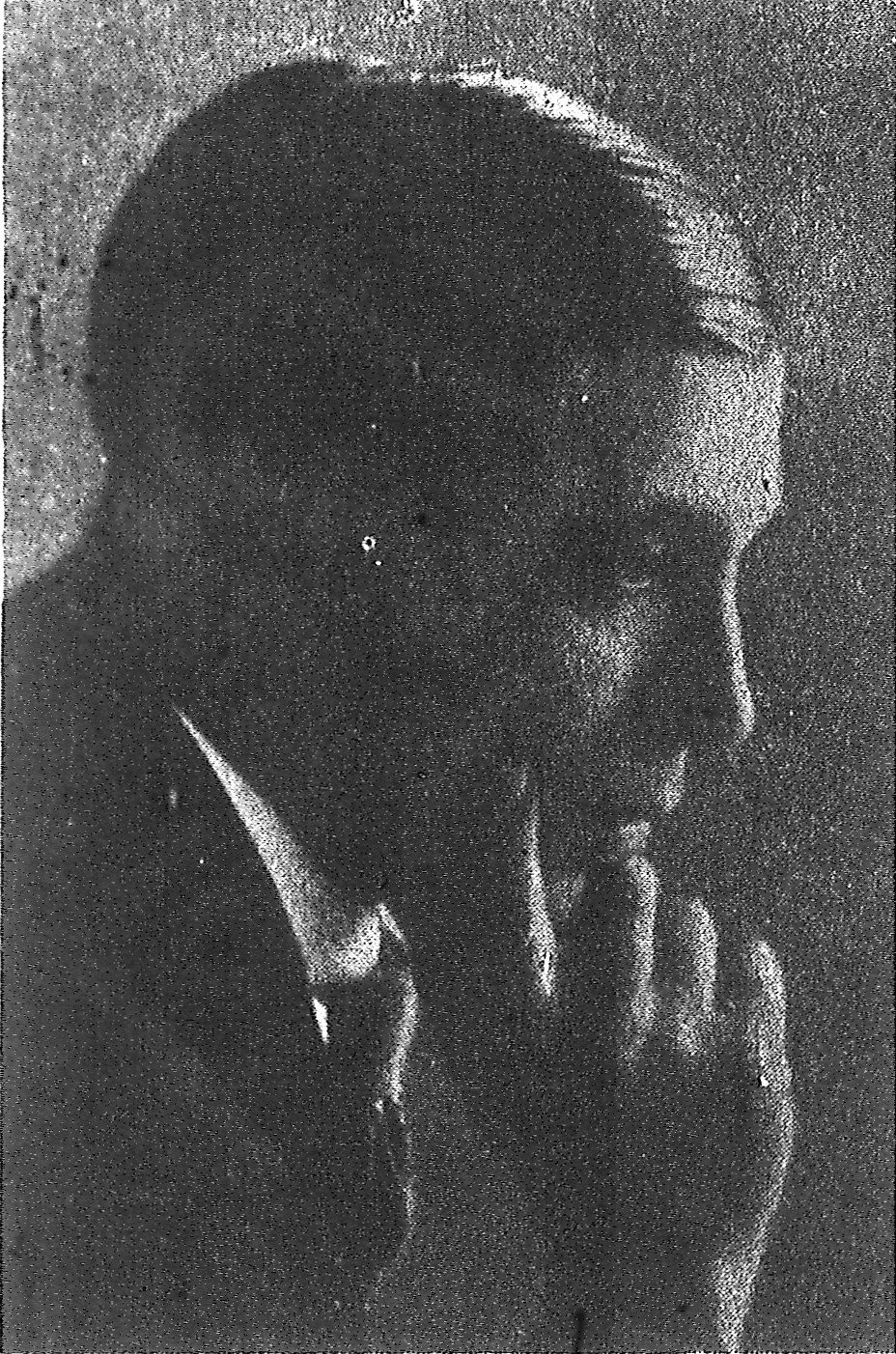
- Born: December 31, 1886; Cosenza, Italy
- Died: August 1, 1920 (aged 33)
- Occupation: Cinematographer
- Title: A.S.C. Founding Member
- Relatives: Tony Gaudio (brother)

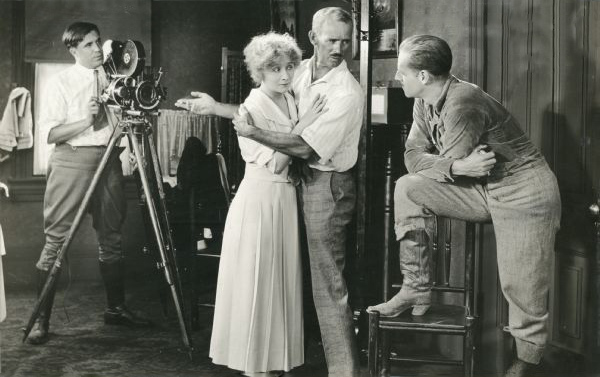
Original caption: "Howard Hickman, husband and director of Bessie Barriscale, shows leading man Jack Holt how to make love to Mrs. Hickman." This appears to be a Kitty Kelly, M.D. production still from 1919. If so, the cameraman behind the Bell & Howell model 2709 is Eugene Gaudio.

Eugene Gaudio (December 31, 1886 – August 1, 1920) was a cinematographer.

== Biography ==
Brother of future A.S.C. member Tony Gaudio, Eugene Gaudio was born in Cosenza in Italy on December 31, 1886. He learned photography in his father's portrait studio and developed an interest in movies around 1905. After coming to the United States, he served as lab superintendent for IMP and the Life Photo Film Corporation. Arriving in California in 1915, Gaudio came out of the darkroom and went behind the camera for Universal. The best-known of his early efforts as a cinematographer is the 1916 production of 20,000 Leagues Under the Sea. He later photographed films for Metro's top female stars, Alla Nazimova and May Allison. His final work was with actress Bessie Barriscale’s B. B. Features.

Gaudio suffered an acute attack of appendicitis and died on August 1, 1920, from general peritonitis after an operation. Gaudio is buried at the Hollywood Forever Cemetery in Los Angeles, California.

== Cinematographer ==
- The House of Fear (1915)
- The White Terror (1915)
- The House of Fear (1915)
- Elusive Isabel (1916)
- 20,000 Leagues Under the Sea (1916)
- Revelation (1918)
- The Shell Game (1918)
- Social Hypocrites (1918)
- Toys of Fate (1918)
- The House of Gold (1918)
- The House of Mirth (1918)
- Eye for Eye (1918)
- A Man's World (1918)
- Out of the Fog (1919)
- One-Thing-at-a-Time O'Day (1919)
- The Uplifters (1919)
- The Man Who Stayed at Home (1919)
- The Brat (1919)
- Kitty Kelly, M.D. (1919)
- Beckoning Roads (1919)
- The Luck of Geraldine Laird (1920)
- The Notorious Mrs. Sands (1920)
- Life's Twist (1920)
