= 1919 in film =

The year 1919 in film involved some significant events.

== Top-grossing films (U.S.) ==
The top six 1919 released films by box office gross in North America are as follows:

Highest-grossing films of 1919
Rank	Title	Studio	Domestic rentals
1	Male and Female	Paramount	$1,256,267
2	Daddy-Long-Legs	First National	$1,250,000
3	The Miracle Man	Paramount	$1,000,000
4	Broken Blossoms	United Artists	$600,000
5	Don't Change Your Husband	Paramount	$292,394
6	For Better, for Worse	Paramount	$256,072

== Events ==
- February 5 – Charlie Chaplin, Mary Pickford, Douglas Fairbanks and D. W. Griffith launch United Artists.
- March – Oscar Micheaux premieres The Homesteader, the first feature-length race film, starring pioneering African American actress Evelyn Preer, becoming the first African American to produce and direct a motion picture.
- May 13 – D. W. Griffith's first film to be released by United Artists, Broken Blossoms, has its premiere in New York City.
- August 29 – The Miracle Man displayed Lon Chaney's talent for make-up and made him famous as a character actor.
- September 1 – United Artists release their first film, His Majesty, the American starring Douglas Fairbanks.
- September 18 – Ufa-Palast am Zoo in Berlin opens rebuilt as a permanent cinema with the première of Ernst Lubitsch's Madame Dubarry.
- September 25 – Dalagang Bukid (The Country Maiden), the first Filipino feature-length film made in the Philippines, released.
- October 24 – The Capitol Theatre in New York City becomes one of the largest cinemas in the world with 4,000 seats.
- November 16 – Constance Talmadge becomes a star with the release of A Virtuous Vamp.
- November 23 – Cecil B. DeMille's Male and Female is released and grosses $1,256,226.59, establishing Gloria Swanson as a worldwide star.
- Harold Lloyd begins holding test screenings of his films and modifying them based on audience feedback, a technique which continues in use.
- Tri-Ergon sound-on-film technology is developed by three German inventors, Josef Engl, Hans Vogt (engineer), and Joseph Massole; however, the era of sound films is over 6 years away.

== Notable films released in 1919 around the world ==
=== A ===
- Anne of Green Gables, directed by William Desmond Taylor; starring Mary Miles Minter and Paul Kelly
- The Avalanche directed by George Fitzmaurice starring Elsie Ferguson
- L'atleta fantasma/ The Ghost Athlete (Italian), directed by Raimondo Scotti, starring Mario Guaita-Ausonia and Elsa Zara, features a masked superhero/ wrestler character

=== B ===
- The Beetle, directed by Alexander Butler – (GB) based on the 1897 novel The Beetle: A Mystery by Richard Marsh
- The Belle of New York, directed by Julius Steger; starring Marion Davies
- The Better 'Ole – (GB)
- Blind Husbands, directed by and starring Erich von Stroheim
- Bolshevism on Trial, directed by Harley Knoles
- The Boy in Blue (Knabe in Blau), directed by F. W. Murnau – (Germany)
- Broken Blossoms, directed by D. W. Griffith, starring Lillian Gish and Richard Barthelmess
- Bumping into Broadway, starring Harold Lloyd and Bebe Daniels

=== C ===
- Captain Kidd's Kids, a Harold Lloyd short
- The Cinema Murder, directed by George D. Baker; starring Marion Davies
- Country Maiden (Dalagang Bukid), directed by José Nepomuceno; starring Atang de la Rama – Philippines
- Creaking Stairs (aka Dearie) directed by Rupert Julian for Universal Pictures, starring Mary MacLaren and Herbert Prior

=== D ===
- Daddy-Long-Legs, starring Mary Pickford
- Damaged Goods, directed by Alexander Butler – (GB)
- Dance of Death/ Totentanz (German) written by Fritz Lang, directed by Otto Rippert, starring Werner Krauss
- The Dark Star, directed by Allan Dwan; starring Marion Davies and Norman Kerry
- The Delicious Little Devil, starring Mae Murray and Rudolph Valentino
- The Devil's Locksmith (Austrian) directed by Franz Ferdinand, starring Ferdinand and Herr Ruibar
- Different from the Others, directed by Richard Oswald, starring Conrad Veidt – (Germany)
- The Doll, directed by Ernst Lubitsch – (Germany)
- Don't Change Your Husband, directed by Cecil B. DeMille, starring Gloria Swanson

=== E ===
- The Echo of Youth, directed by Ivan Abramson

=== F ===
- The Face at the Window (Australian) directed by Charles Villiers, starring D.B. O'Conner, Agnes Dobson and Claude Turton, based on the 1897 stage play by F. Brooke Warren
- The False Faces, directed by Irvin Willat, starring Henry B. Walthall and Lon Chaney
- The First Men in the Moon – (GB)

=== G ===
- Getting Mary Married, directed by Allan Dwan; starring Marion Davies and Matt Moore
- The Grim Game, starring Harry Houdini

=== H ===
- The Haunted Bedroom (aka The Ghost of Whispering Oaks) directed by Fred Niblo for Thomas H. Ince, starring Enid Bennett (Niblo's wife) and Dorcas Matthews
- Haunting Shadows, directed by Henry King, starring H. B. Warner and Edward Peil Sr., based on the 1906 novel The House of a Thousand Candles by Meredith Nicholson
- Hawthorne of the U.S.A. directed by James Cruze, starring Wallace Reid
- Heart o' the Hills directed by Sidney Franklin, starring Mary Pickford
- Here Comes the Bride directed by John S. Robertson, starring John Barrymore, Faire Binney
- His Majesty, the American, starring Douglas Fairbanks
- The Homesteader, directed by Oscar Micheaux, starring Evelyn Preer

=== I ===
- Intoxication, directed by Ernst Lubitsch, starring Asta Nielsen (Germany)

=== J ===
- The Jack of Hearts, starring Hoot Gibson
- J'accuse (French), written and directed by Abel Gance for Pathe Films – (France) starring Romuald Joubé, Severin-Mars, and Maryse Dauvray; this was Gance's most acclaimed film and he remade it with sound in 1938
- Juan Sin Ropa, Argentine film directed by Georges Benoît, starring Camila Quiroga and Héctor G. Quiroga, and produced by Quiroga-Benoît Film, a company made up of the three of them. It was one of the great successes of Argentina's silent film boom of the mid-to-late 1910s and continues to be celebrated retrospectively.

=== K ===
- The Knickerbocker Buckaroo, starring Douglas Fairbanks

=== L ===
- The Life Line, directed by Maurice Tourneur, starring Wallace Beery
- Lilith and Ly (Austrian) written by Fritz Lang, directed by Erich Kober, starring Elga Beck and Ernst Escherich
- The Lost Battalion
- The Love Cheat, starring June Caprice and Creighton Hale
- Love's Prisoner, starring Olive Thomas
- Lucrezia Borgia (Italian) directed by Augusto Genina, starring Diana Karenne

=== M ===
- Madame Dubarry, directed by Ernst Lubitsch, starring Pola Negri and Emil Jannings – (Germany)
- Madness / Wahnsinn (German) produced and directed by Conrad Veidt, who also starred in the film; adapted from a novel by Kurt Muenzner
- Male and Female, directed by Cecil B. DeMille, starring Gloria Swanson and Thomas Meighan
- The Master Mystery, (serial), starring Harry Houdini
- The Miracle Man, starring Thomas Meighan, Lon Chaney and Betty Compson
- The Mistress of the World, directed by Joe May (Weimar Republic)
- The Monkey's Paw (British), lost film based on the story by W. W. Jacobs first published by 1902, and the related one-act stage play written by Louis N. Parker in 1907
- My Lady's Garter, directed by Maurice Tourneur
- My Wife, the Movie Star, directed by Ernst Lubitsch (Germany)

=== N ===
- Nabeshima Neko Sodo (Japanese) a ghost-cat film produced by Nikkatsu Films, starring Matsunosuke Onoe, based on the Kabuki play by Joko Segawa III
- Okazaki Kaibyo-den (Japanese) starring Matsunosuke Onoe, another ghost-cat movie based on an early 1820s Japanese novel (which was adapted as a Kabuki play in 1827)

=== O ===
- The Oyster Princess (Die Austerprinzessin) – (Germany)

=== P ===
- The Phantom Honeymoon, written and directed by J. Searle Dawley (who directed the 1910 Thomas Edison Frankenstein), starring Leon Dadmun and Marguerite Marsh
- The Plague of Florence / Die Pest in Florenz (German) written by Fritz Lang, directed by Otto Rippert, starring Otto Mannstaedt and Anders Wikman; this was Fritz Lang's adaptation of The Masque of the Red Death by Edgar Allan Poe

=== R ===
- Ravished Armenia (aka Auction of Souls) – directed by Oscar Apfel, starring Aurora Mardiganian
- The Roaring Road, directed by James Cruze, starring Wallace Reid

=== S ===
- Sahara, starring Louise Glaum, written by C. Gardner Sullivan
- Satanas / Satan (German) written by Robert Wiene, directed by F. W. Murnau, starring Fritz Kortner and Conrad Veidt; a small fragment of this film still exists at the Cinémathèque Française
- The Sentimental Bloke – (Australia)
- Sir Arne's Treasure (Herr Arnes pengar), directed by Mauritz Stiller, starring Richard Lund – (Sweden)
- A Society Exile directed by George Fitzmaurice starring Elsie Ferguson
- Sons of Ingmar (Ingmarssönerna), directed by Victor Sjöström – (Sweden)
- South (documentary of Sir Ernest Shackleton's Endurance Imperial Trans-Antarctic Expedition), filmed by Frank Hurley – (GB)

=== T ===
- The Test of Honor, directed by John S. Robertson, starring John Barrymore, and Constance Binney
- The Thirteenth Chair, directed by Leonce Perret, starring Yvonne Delva and Creighton Hale, based on a play by Bayard Veiller; this film was later remade by Tod Browning in 1929 with sound
- To Let (British) short ghost film directed by James Reardon, starring Reardon and Peggy Patterson
- The Trembling Hour, directed by George Siegmann for Universal Films, starring Kenneth Harlan and Helen Jerome Eddy; parts of this film were shot in San Quentin State Prison in California
- True Heart Susie, starring Lillian Gish and Bobby Harron
- The Twin Pawns (aka The Curse of Greed) written and directed by Leonce Perret, starring Mae Murray (playing twins) and Warner Oland, based on the Wilkie Collins novel The Woman in White

=== V ===
- The Valley of the Giants, directed by James Cruze, starring Wallace Reid
- La Venganza de Don Silvestre, directed by José Nepomuceno – (Philippines)
- Victory, directed by Maurice Tourneur, starring Lon Chaney, Seena Owen, Wallace Beery, Jack Holt

=== W ===
- Weird Tales/ Unheimliche Geschichten/ Uncanny Tales (German) horror anthology written and directed by Richard Oswald, starring Conrad Veidt and Anita Berber; composed of 5 weird stories adapted from the works of Edgar Allan Poe, Robert Louis Stevenson and others
- When the Clouds Roll By, starring Douglas Fairbanks
- The White Heather, directed by Maurice Tourneur
- The Wicked Darling, directed by Tod Browning, starring Lon Chaney and Priscilla Dean
- The Witness for the Defense starring Elsie Ferguson and Warner Oland

=== Y ===
- Yankee Doodle in Berlin, directed by F. Richard Jones, starring Bothwell Browne, Ford Sterling, Marie Prevost, produced by Mack Sennett
- You're Fired, directed by James Cruze, starring Wallace Reid & Wanda Hawley

== Comedy film series ==
Only the films of the series released in 1919 are collected.

=== Buster Keaton (1917–1941) ===
Films starring Roscoe Arbuckle, featuring Buster Keaton released in 1919:

- September 7: Back Stage a "Fatty" Arbuckle / Buster Keaton short.
- October 26: The Hayseed as a Manager, general store.

=== Charlie Chaplin (1914–1923) ===
Charlie Chaplin wrote, produced, directed, and starred in 9 films for his own production company between 1918 and 1923. These films were distributed by First National. Below the movies filmed in 1919:

- May 15: Sunnyside; Three reels Score composed for 1974 re-release
- December 15: A Day's Pleasure; Two reels. First film with Jackie Coogan, future star of "The Kid"

Score composed for 1973 re-release

Uncompleted and unreleased films

- The Professor as Professor Bosco, Slated as a two-reeler, but never issued

=== Harold Lloyd (1913–1921) ===
Glasses character ("The Boy"):

- Wanted – $5,000
- Going! Going! Gone!
- Ask Father
- On the Fire, aka. The Chef
- I'm on My Way
- Look Out Below
- The Dutiful Dub
- Next Aisle Over
- A Sammy in Siberia
- Just Dropped In
- Young Mr. Jazz
- Crack Your Heels
- Ring Up the Curtain, aka Back-Stage!
- Si, Senor
- Before Breakfast
- The Marathon
- Pistols for Breakfast
- Swat the Crook
- Off the Trolley
- Spring Fever
- Billy Blazes, Esq. – as Billy Blazes; the film was a parody of Westerns of the time
- Just Neighbors
- At the Old Stage Door
- Never Touched Me
- A Jazzed Honeymoon
- Count Your Change
- Chop Suey & Co.
- Heap Big Chief
- Don't Shove
- Be My Wife
- The Rajah
- He Leads, Others Follow
- Soft Money
- Count the Votes
- Pay Your Dues
- His Only Father
- Bumping Into Broadway
- Captain Kidd's Kids
- From Hand to Mouth

== Animated short film series ==
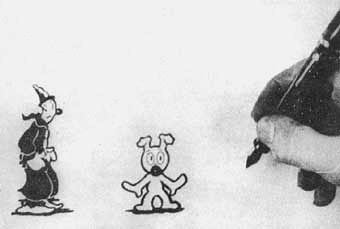
Out of the Inkwell.

=== Koko the Clown (1919–1934) ===
Koko the Clown was the first animated movie cartoon series. Below list of short films released in 1919:

- The Tantalizing Fly
- The Clown's Pups
- Out of the Inkwell
- Slides
- Experiment No. 2
- Experiment No. 3
- Out of the Inkwell

=== Felix the Cat (1919–1936) ===
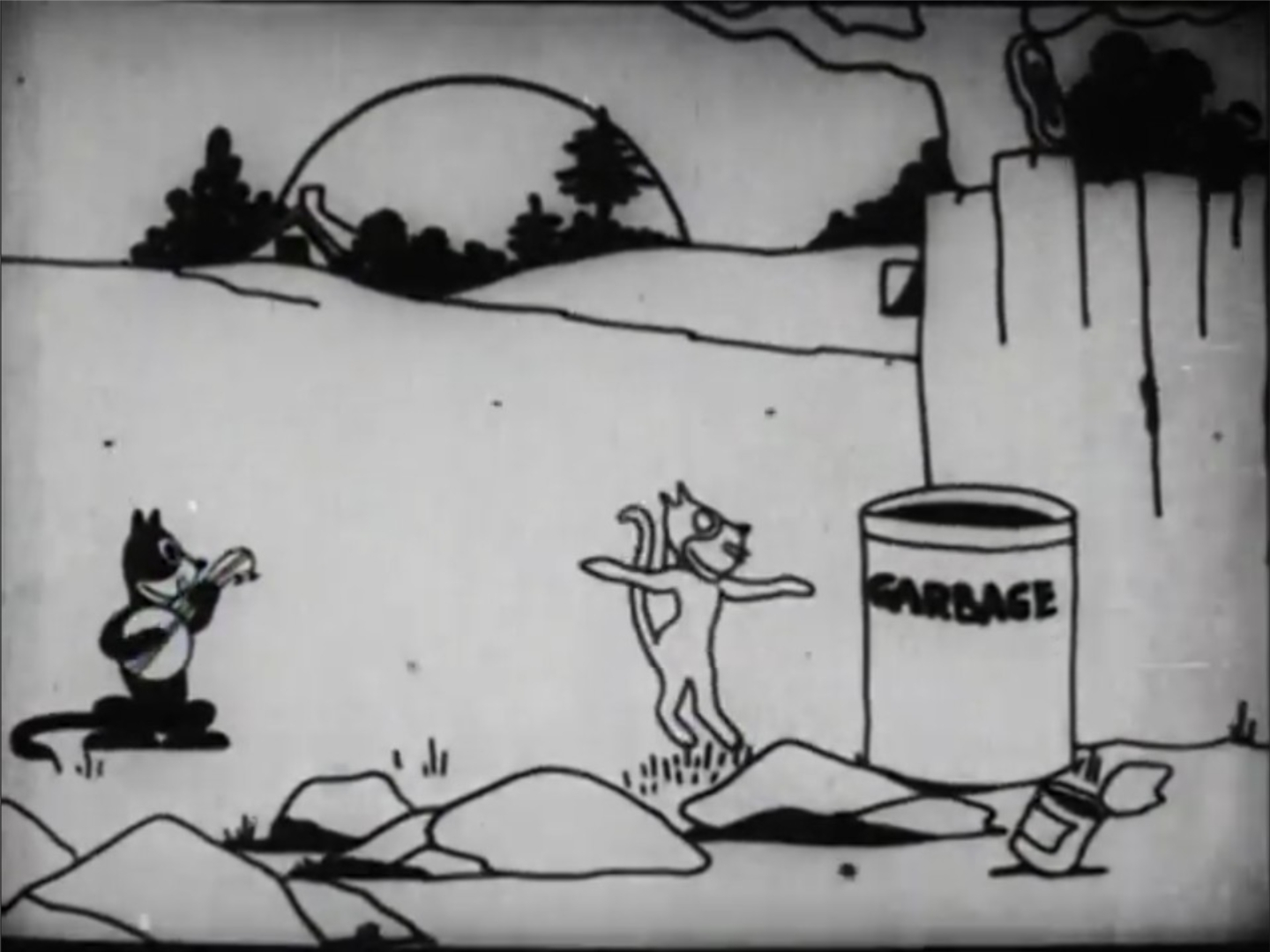
Felix the cat in his first cartoon Feline Follies.

Below list of Felix the Cat short films released in 1919:

November 9: Feline Follies
November 16: The Musical Mews
December 14: The Adventures of Felix

== Births ==
- January 1 – Sheila Mercier, British actress (died 2019)
- January 5 – Douglas Henderson, American actor (died 1978)
- January 7 – Huang Feng, Hong Kong film director (died 2019)
- January 10 – Amzie Strickland, American character actress (died 2006)
- January 11 – Mort Mills, American actor (died 1993)
- January 13 – Robert Stack, American actor (died 2003)
- January 14 – Joe Seneca, American actor and singer (died 1996)
- January 21 – Jinx Falkenburg, American model, actress (died 2003)
- January 23 – Ernie Kovacs, American comedian, actor (died 1962)
- January 24 – Coleman Francis, American actor, director, producer, and screenwriter (died 1973)
- February 4 – Janet Waldo, American actress (died 2016)
- February 5
  - Red Buttons, American actor (died 2006)
  - Tim Holt, American actor (died 1973)
- February 11 – Eva Gabor, Hungarian actress (died 1995)
- February 12 – Forrest Tucker, American actor (died 1986)
- February 18 – Jack Palance, American actor (died 2006)
- March 2 – Jennifer Jones, American actress and mental-health advocate (died 2009)
- March 12 – Frank Campanella, American actor (died 2006)
- March 15 - Lawrence Tierney, American actor (died 2002)
- March 25 – Jeanne Cagney, American actress (died 1984)
- March 26 – Strother Martin, American actor (died 1980)
- March 29 – Eileen Heckart, American actress (died 2001)
- April 2 – Maxwell Reed, Northern Irish actor (died 1974)
- April 6 – Caren Marsh Doll, American former actress
- April 12 – Ivor Barry, Welsh actor (died 2006)
- April 13 – Howard Keel, American actor (died 2004)
- April 18 – Vondell Darr, American child actress (died 2012)
- April 18 – Virginia O'Brien, American actress (died 2001)
- May 1 – Dan O'Herlihy, Irish actor (died 2005)
- May 8 – Lex Barker, American actor (died 1973)
- May 22 – Raoul Retzer, Austrian actor (died 1974)
- May 23 – Betty Garrett, American actress (died 2011)
- June 11 – Richard Todd, Irish actor (died 2009)
- June 12 – Uta Hagen, German actress (died 2004)
- June 14
  - Gene Barry, American actor and singer (died 2009)
  - June Spencer, British actress (died 2024)
  - Sam Wanamaker, American actor and director (died 1993)
- June 17 – Patrick Cranshaw, American character actor (died 2005)
- June 19 – Pauline Kael, American film critic (died 2001)
- June 24 – Al Molinaro, American actor (died 2015)
- June 29 – Slim Pickens, American actor (died 1983)
- July 7 – Jon Pertwee, British actor (died 1996)
- July 8 - Eileen Bennett, British actress (died 2025)
- July 12 – Vera Ralston, Czech figure skater, actress (died 2003)
- July 14 – Lino Ventura, Italian-born actor and philanthropist (died 1987)
- July 19 – Patricia Medina, American actress (died 2012)
- July 26 – Virginia Gilmore, American actress (died 1986)
- August 2 – Nehemiah Persoff, American actor (died 2022)
- August 7 – Bertha Moss, Argentine-Mexican actress (died 2008)
- August 8 – Dino De Laurentiis, Italian producer (died 2010)
- August 16 – Lorna Thayer, American actress (died 2005)
- August 22 – Alma Beltran, Mexican-American actress (died 2007)
- September 2 – Marge Champion, American dancer and actress (died 2020)
- September 6 – John Mitchum, American actor (died 2001)
- September 7 – Howard Morris, American actor, comedian and director (died 2005)
- September 9 – Jacques Marin, French actor (died 2001)
- September 17 – Helmut Ashley, Austrian cinematographer and director (died 2021)
- September 18 – Diana Lewis, American actress (died 1997)
- September 21 – Nigel Stock, British actor (died 1986)
- September 24 – Rick Vallin, Russian-born actor (died 1977)
- October 5 – Donald Pleasence, British actor (died 1995)
- October 8 – Gabriel Dell, American actor (died 1988)
- October 18 – Orlando Drummond, Brazilian actor, voice artist and comedian (died 2021)
- October 20 – Lia Origoni, Italian actress and singer (died 2022)
- October 25 – Rico Alaniz, Mexican-American actor (died 2015)
- October 28 – Ezz El-Dine Zulficar, Egyptian director and producer (died 1963)
- November 2 – Warren Stevens, American actor (died 2012)
- November 3 – Bert Freed, American actor (died 1994)
- November 4
  - Shirley Mitchell, American actress (died 2013)
  - Martin Balsam, American actor (died 1996)
- November 7 – Aline Towne, American actress (died 1996)
- November 13 – Mary Beth Hughes, American actress (died 1995)
- November 15 – Nova Pilbeam, British actress (died 2015)
- November 19
  - Lynn Merrick, American actress (died 2007)
  - Alan Young, British actor (died 2016)
- November 20 – Phyllis Thaxter, American actress (died 2012)
- November 21 – Steve Brodie, American actor (died 1992)
- November 24 – David Kossoff, British actor (died 2005)
- December 5 – Guido Gorgatti, Italian-born Argentine actor (died 2023)
- December 7 – Lis Løwert, Danish actress (died 2009)
- December 11 – Marie Windsor, American actress (died 2000)
- December 12 – Adriana Benetti, Italian actress (died 2016)
- December 18 – Lynn Bari, American actress (died 1989)
- December 21
  - Ove Sprogøe, Danish actor (died 2004)
  - Doug Young, American voice actor (died 2018)

== Deaths ==
- January 14 – Shelley Hull, 34, American stage & film actor, husband of Josephine Hull, brother of Henry Hull
- January 31 – Nat Goodwin, 59, veteran stage star & silent film actor
- February 3 – Mary Moore, 29, Irish actress, sister of Joe, Matt, Owen and Tom Moore, A Million a Minute
- February 17 – Vera Kholodnaya, 25, Russian silent film actress, A Corpse Living, The Woman Who Invented Love, Her Sister's Rival, Song of Triumphant Love
- April 9 – Sidney Drew, 55, American stage & film actor A Florida Enchantment
- May 3 – Daniel Gilfether, 70, American actor of stage & screen
- May 21 – Lamar Johnstone, 34, American silent film actor
- August 27 – Clifford Bruce, 34, American silent film actor
- November 24 – William Stowell, 34, American silent film star

== Film debuts ==
- Ernie Adams – A Regular Girl
- Vilma Bánky – Im letzten Augenblick
- Renée Björling – The Downy Girl
- Jeanne Carpenter – Daddy-Long-Legs
- Ronald Colman – The Toilers
- Bebe Daniels – Male and Female
- Miss DuPont – Lombardi, Ltd.
- Ruth Dwyer – The Lurking Peril
- Mary Forbes – Women Who Win
- Gladys George – Red Hot Dollars
- Ella Gombaszögi – Átok Vára
- Sascha Gura – The Dance of Death
- Boris Karloff – The Lightning Raider
- Roscoe Karns – Poor Relations
- Fritz Lang (director) – Halbblut
- Laura La Plante – The Great Gamble
- Helen Lowell – The Virtuous Model
- Sybill Morel – Opium
- Jack Perrin – Toton
- Lydia Potechina – Anita Jo
- Annie Rosar – Der Mord an der Bajadere
- Christian Rub – The Belle of New York
- Estelle Taylor – A Broadway Saint
- Guinn "Big Boy" Williams – Almost a Husband
- Claire Windsor – The Pest
- Carl-Gunnar Wingård – The Downy Girl
- Anna May Wong – The Red Lantern

== See also ==
- List of American films of 1919
