= List of American films of 1919 =

American films released in 1919

More than 760 American feature films were released in the year 1919.

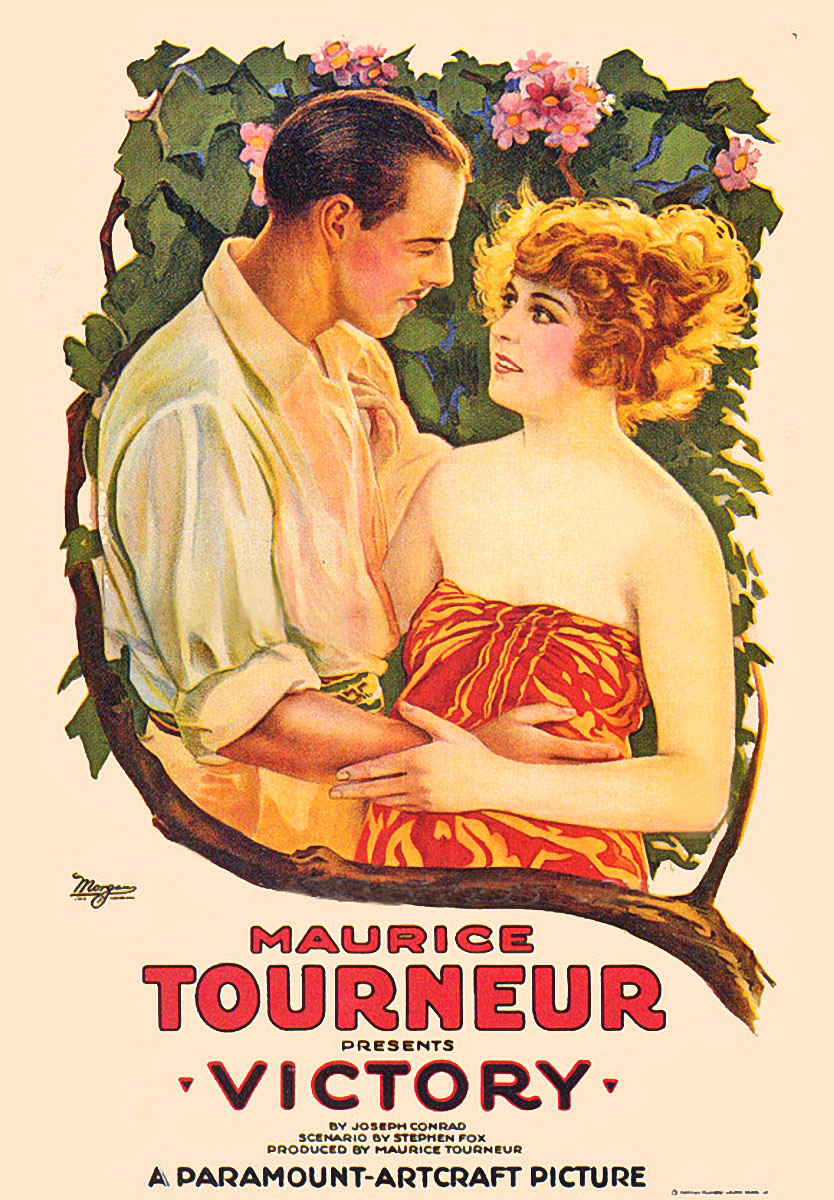
Victory directed by Maurice Tourneur and starring Jack Holt, Seena Owen and Lon Chaney.

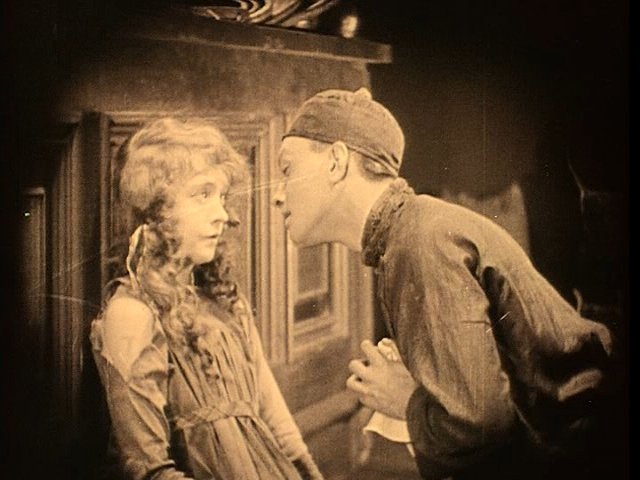
Broken Blossoms with Lillian Gish and Richard Barthelmess.

== A ==
Title	Director	Cast	Genre	Note
23 1/2 Hours' Leave	Henry King	Douglas MacLean, Doris May	Comedy	Paramount
The A.B.C. of Love	Léonce Perret	Mae Murray, Holmes Herbert	Drama	Pathé Exchange
Ace of the Saddle	John Ford	Harry Carey, Peggy Pearce	Western	Universal
An Adventure in Hearts	James Cruze	Robert Warwick, Helene Chadwick	Adventure	Paramount
The Adventure Shop	Kenneth S. Webb	Corinne Griffith, Walter McGrail	Comedy	Vitagraph
After His Own Heart	Harry L. Franklin	Hale Hamilton, Naomi Childers	Comedy	Metro
Alias Mike Moran	James Cruze	Wallace Reid, Ann Little	Comedy	Paramount
All of a Sudden Norma	Howard C. Hickman	Bessie Barriscale, Joseph J. Dowling	Comedy drama	Robertson-Cole
All Wrong	William Worthington	Bryant Washburn, Mildred Davis	Comedy	Pathé Exchange
Almost a Husband	Clarence G. Badger	Will Rogers, Peggy Wood, Herbert Standing	Comedy	Goldwyn
Almost Married	Charles Swickard	May Allison, June Elvidge, Sam Hardy	Comedy	Metro
The Amateur Adventuress	Henry Otto	Emmy Wehlen, Eugene Pallette	Comedy	Metro
The Amazing Impostor	Lloyd Ingraham	Mary Miles Minter, Carl Stockdale	Comedy	Pathé Exchange
The Amazing Wife	Ida May Park	Mary MacLaren, Frank Mayo	Drama	Universal
An Innocent Adventuress	Robert G. Vignola	Vivian Martin, Lloyd Hughes	Comedy	Paramount
Anne of Green Gables	William Desmond Taylor	Mary Miles Minter, Paul Kelly	Comedy drama	Paramount
Are You Legally Married?	Robert Thornby	Lew Cody, Rosemary Theby, Roy Laidlaw	Drama	Independent
As a Man Thinks	George Irving	Leah Baird, Warburton Gamble	Drama	Pathé Exchange
As the Sun Went Down	E. Mason Hopper	Edith Storey, Lew Cody	Western	Metro
Atonement	William Humphrey	Grace Davison, Conway Tearle, Huntley Gordon	Drama	Independent
The Avalanche	George Fitzmaurice	Elsie Ferguson, Lumsden Hare	Drama	Paramount

== B ==
Title	Director	Cast	Genre	Note
A Bachelor's Wife	Emmett J. Flynn	Mary Miles Minter, Allan Forrest	Comedy	Pathé Exchange
The Bandbox	Roy William Neill	Doris Kenyon, Gretchen Hartman	Mystery	Pathé Exchange
Bare-Fisted Gallagher	Joseph Franz	William Desmond, Agnes Vernon	Western	Robertson-Cole
Bare Fists	John Ford	Harry Carey, Betty Schade	Western	Universal
Be a Little Sport	Scott R. Dunlap	Albert Ray, Elinor Fair	Comedy	Fox Film
The Beauty Market	Colin Campbell	Katherine MacDonald, Winter Hall	Romance	First National
Beauty-Proof	Paul Scardon	Harry T. Morey, Betty Blythe	Drama	Vitagraph
Beating the Odds	Paul Scardon	Harry T. Morey, Betty Blythe	Drama	Vitagraph
Beckoning Roads	Howard C. Hickman	Bessie Barriscale, Niles Welch	Drama	Robertson-Cole
Behind the Door	Irvin Willat	Hobart Bosworth, Jane Novak, Wallace Beery	War drama	Paramount
The Belle of New York	Julius Steger	Marion Davies, Etienne Girardot	Drama	Independent
The Belle of the Season	S. Rankin Drew	Emmy Wehlen, Louis Wolheim	Comedy	Metro
The Best Man	Thomas N. Heffron	J. Warren Kerrigan, Lois Wilson	Comedy	Pathé Exchange
Better Times	King Vidor	David Butler, ZaSu Pitts	Drama	Robertson-Cole
The Better Wife	William P. S. Earle	Clara Kimball Young, Nigel Barrie	Drama	Independent
Beware!	William Nigh	Julia Hurley, Herbert Standing	War	Warner Bros.
The Big Little Person	Robert Z. Leonard	Mae Marsh, Rudolph Valentino	Romance	Universal
Bill Apperson's Boy	James Kirkwood	Jack Pickford, Russell Simpson, Gloria Hope	Drama	First National
Bill Henry	Jerome Storm	Charles Ray, Edith Roberts	Comedy	Paramount
The Bishop's Emeralds	John B. O'Brien	Virginia Pearson, Lucy Fox	Drama	Pathé Exchange
The Black Circle	Frank Reicher	Creighton Hale, Virginia Valli	Drama	Independent
The Black Gate	Theodore Marston	Earle Williams, Ruth Clifford	Mystery	Vitagraph
Blackie's Redemption	John Ince	Bert Lytell, Alice Lake	Drama	Metro
Blind Husbands	Erich von Stroheim	Erich von Stroheim, Francelia Billington	Drama Romance	Universal
Blind Man's Eyes	John Ince	Bert Lytell, Frank Currier, Naomi Childers	Drama	Metro
The Blinding Trail	Paul Powell	Monroe Salisbury, Claire Anderson	Drama	Universal
The Blue Bandanna	Joseph Franz	William Desmond, Russell Simpson	Drama	Robertson-Cole
The Blue Bonnet	Louis Chaudet	Billie Rhodes, Ben F. Wilson, Irene Rich	Drama	Pathé Exchange
The Bluffer	Travers Vale	June Elvidge, Irving Cummings, Frank Mayo	Drama	Independent
Bolshevism on Trial	Harley Knoles, Lewis J. Selznick	Robert Frazer, Pinna Nesbit	Drama	Independent
The Bondage of Barbara	Emmett J. Flynn	Mae Marsh, Matt Moore	Drama	Goldwyn
Bonds of Honor	William Worthington	Sessue Hayakawa, Marin Sais	Drama	Robertson-Cole
Bonds of Love	Reginald Barker	Pauline Frederick, Percy Standing	Romance	Goldwyn
Bonnie Bonnie Lassie	Tod Browning	Mary MacLaren, Spottiswoode Aitken	Comedy	Universal
Boots	Elmer Clifton	Dorothy Gish, Richard Barthelmess	Comedy	Paramount
The Busher	Jerome Storm	Charles Ray, Colleen Moore, John Gilbert	Drama	Paramount
The Bramble Bush	Tom Terriss	Corinne Griffith, Julia Swayne Gordon	Drama	Vitagraph
The Brand	Reginald Barker	Russell Simpson, Robert McKim	Adventure	Goldwyn
Brass Buttons	Henry King	William Russell, Eileen Percy	Comedy	Pathé Exchange
The Brat	Herbert Blache	Alla Nazimova, Charles Bryant	Drama	Metro
Breed of Men	Lambert Hillyer	William S. Hart, Seena Owen	Western	Paramount
Bringing Up Betty	Oscar Apfel	Evelyn Greeley, Reginald Denny	Comedy	Independent
A Broadway Saint	Harry O. Hoyt	Montagu Love, George Bunny	Comedy	World
Broken Blossoms	D. W. Griffith	Lillian Gish, Richard Barthelmess	Drama	United Artists
The Broken Butterfly	Maurice Tourneur	Lew Cody, Mary Alden, Pauline Starke	Drama	Robertson-Cole
The Broken Commandments	Frank Beal	Gladys Brockwell, Tom Santschi	Drama	Fox Film
The Broken Melody	William P. S. Earle	Eugene O'Brien, Lucy Cotton	Drama	Selznick
The Brute Breaker	Lynn Reynolds	Frank Mayo, Harry Northrup	Action	Universal
Burglar by Proxy	John Francis Dillon	Jack Pickford, Gloria Hope	Comedy	First National

== C ==
Title	Director	Cast	Genre	Note
The Call of the Soul	Edward LeSaint	Gladys Brockwell, William Scott	Drama	Fox Film
The Cambric Mask	Tom Terriss	Alice Joyce, Maurice Costello	Drama	Vitagraph
Captain Kidd, Jr.	William Desmond Taylor	Mary Pickford, Douglas MacLean	Comedy	Paramount
The Capitol	George Irving	Leah Baird, Alexander Gaden	Drama	Hodkinson
The Captain's Captain	Tom Terriss	Alice Joyce, Percy Standing	Comedy drama	Vitagraph
The Career of Katherine Bush	Roy William Neill	Catherine Calvert, Crauford Kent	Drama	Paramount
Carolyn of the Corners	Robert Thornby	Bessie Love, Charlotte Mineau	Drama	Pathé Exchange
Castles in the Air	George D. Baker	May Allison, Clarence Burton	Comedy	Metro
Charge It to Me	Roy William Neill	Margarita Fischer, Emory Johnson	Comedy	Pathé Exchange
Chasing Rainbows	Frank Beal	Gladys Brockwell, William Scott	Western	Fox Film
Cheating Cheaters	Allan Dwan	Jack Holt, Clara Kimball Young	Comedy	Independent
Cheating Herself	Edmund Lawrence	Peggy Hyland, Harry Hilliard	Comedy	Fox Film
Checkers	Richard Stanton	Thomas Carrigan, Jean Acker	Adventure	Independent
The Cinema Murder	George D. Baker	Marion Davies, Eulalie Jensen, Anders Randolf	Drama	Paramount
The City of Comrades	Harry Beaumont	Tom Moore, Seena Owen	Drama	Goldwyn
The Climbers	Tom Terriss	Corinne Griffith, Percy Marmont	Comedy	Vitagraph
Come Again Smith	E. Mason Hopper	J. Warren Kerrigan, Lois Wilson	Comedy drama	Pathé Exchange
Come Out of the Kitchen	John S. Robertson	Marguerite Clark, Eugene O'Brien	Drama	Paramount
The Coming of the Law	Arthur Rosson	Tom Mix, Agnes Vernon	Western	Fox Film
The Common Cause	J. Stuart Blackton	Effie Shannon, Irene Castle, Marjorie Rambeau	Comedy	Vitagraph
Common Clay	George Fitzmaurice	Fannie Ward, Fred Goodwins	Drama	Pathé Exchange
Common Property	Paul Powell	Nell Craig, Colleen Moore	Drama	Universal
Counterfeit	George Fitzmaurice	Elsie Ferguson, David Powell	Drama	Paramount
The Country Cousin	Alan Crosland	Elaine Hammerstein, Lumsden Hare	Drama	Selznick
Courage for Two	Dell Henderson	Carlyle Blackwell, Evelyn Greeley, Rosina Henley	Comedy	World
The Courageous Coward	William Worthington	Sessue Hayakawa, Tsuru Aoki	Drama	Robertson-Cole
Cowardice Court	William C. Dowlan	Peggy Hyland, Jack Livingston	Comedy	Fox Film
Creaking Stairs	Rupert Julian	Herbert Prior, Jack Mulhall	Drama	Universal
The Crimson Gardenia	Reginald Barker	Owen Moore, Hedda Nova	Drama	Goldwyn
The Crook of Dreams	Oscar Apfel	Louise Huff, Virginia Hammond, Frank Mayo	Drama	Independent
Crooked Straight	Jerome Storm	Charles Ray, Wade Boteler	Drama	Paramount
Cupid Forecloses	David Smith	Bessie Love, Wallace MacDonald	Comedy	Vitagraph
The Cry of the Weak	George Fitzmaurice	Fannie Ward, Frank Elliott	Drama	Pathé Exchange

== D ==
Title	Director	Cast	Genre	Note
Daddy-Long-Legs	Marshall Neilan	Mary Pickford, Milla Davenport	Drama	First National
A Damsel in Distress	George Archainbaud	June Caprice, Creighton Hale	Comedy	Pathé Exchange
Dangerous Hours	Fred Niblo	Lloyd Hughes, Barbara Castleton	Drama	Paramount
Dangerous Waters	Park Frame	William Desmond, Marguerite De La Motte	Drama	Robertson-Cole
Daring Hearts	Henry Houry	Francis X. Bushman, Beverly Bayne	Drama	Vitagraph
The Dark Star	Allan Dwan	Marion Davies, Norman Kerry	Adventure	Paramount
The Darkest Hour	Paul Scardon	Harry T. Morey, Anna Lehr	Drama	Vitagraph
Daughter of Mine	Clarence G. Badger	Madge Kennedy, John Bowers	Drama	Goldwyn
A Daughter of the Wolf	Irvin Willat	Lila Lee, Elliott Dexter, Clarence Geldart	Drama	Paramount
Dawn	J. Stuart Blackton	Robert Gordon, Sylvia Breamer	Drama	Pathé Exchange
Day Dreams	Clarence G. Badger	Madge Kennedy, John Bowers	Comedy	Goldwyn
The Day She Paid	Rex Ingram	Francelia Billington, Harry von Meter	Romance	Universal
The Delicious Little Devil	Robert Z. Leonard	Mae Murray, Rudolph Valentino	Comedy drama	Universal
Desert Gold	T. Hayes Hunter	E.K. Lincoln, Eileen Percy	Adventure	Pathé Exchange
Destiny	Rollin S. Sturgeon	Dorothy Phillips, Gertrude Astor	Drama	Universal
Devil McCare	Lorimer Johnston	Crane Wilbur, Juanita Hansen	Comedy	Triangle
Diane of the Green Van	Wallace Worsley	Nigel Barrie, Alma Rubens	Comedy	Robertson-Cole
The Divorcee	Herbert Blaché	Ethel Barrymore, Naomi Childers	Drama	Metro
The Divorce Trap	Frank Beal	Gladys Brockwell, Francis McDonald	Drama	Fox Film
Don't Change Your Husband	Cecil B. DeMille	Gloria Swanson, Elliott Dexter	Comedy	Paramount
The Dragon Painter	William Worthington	Sessue Hayakawa, Tsuru Aoki	Drama	Robertson-Cole
The Drifters	Jesse D. Hampton	J. Warren Kerrigan, Lois Wilson	Drama	Pathé Exchange
The Dub	James Cruze	Wallace Reid, Raymond Hatton	Comedy	Paramount

== E ==
Title	Director	Cast	Genre	Note
Eastward Ho!	Emmett J. Flynn	William Russell, Johnny Hines	Drama	Fox Film
Easy to Make Money	Edwin Carewe	Bert Lytell, Frank Currier	Comedy	Metro
The Echo of Youth	Ivan Abramson	Charles Richman, Leah Baird	Drama	Independent
The End of the Game	Jesse D. Hampton	J. Warren Kerrigan, Lois Wilson	Western	Pathé Exchange
The Egg Crate Wallop	Jerome Storm	Charles Ray, Colleen Moore	Comedy	Paramount
The Enchanted Barn	David Smith	Bessie Love, J. Frank Glendon	Drama	Vitagraph
The Eternal Magdalene	Arthur Hopkins	Marguerite Marsh, Vernon Steele	Drama	Goldwyn
Evangeline	Raoul Walsh	Miriam Cooper, Alan Roscoe	Drama	Fox Film
Eve in Exile	Burton George	Charlotte Walker, Tom Santschi	Drama	Pathé Exchange
Everywoman	George Melford	Theodore Roberts, Violet Heming	Drama	Paramount
Experimental Marriage	Robert G. Vignola	Constance Talmadge, Harrison Ford	Romantic comedy	Selznick
Extravagance	Victor Schertzinger	Dorothy Dalton, Charles Clary	Drama	Paramount
The Exquisite Thief	Tod Browning	Priscilla Dean, Thurston Hall	Drama	Universal
Eyes of the Soul	Emile Chautard	Elsie Ferguson, Wyndham Standing	Romance	Paramount
Eyes of Youth	Albert Parker	Clara Kimball Young, Gareth Hughes	Drama	Independent

== F ==
Title	Director	Cast	Genre	Note
Fair and Warmer	Henry Otto	May Allison, Eugene Pallette	Romance	Metro
Faith	Charles Swickard	Bert Lytell, Rosemary Theby	Drama	Metro
The Faith of the Strong	Robert N. Bradbury	Mitchell Lewis, Margaret Gibson	Drama	Selznick
A Fallen Idol	Kenean Buel	Evelyn Nesbit, Lillian Lawrence	Drama	Fox Film
False Evidence	Edwin Carewe	Viola Dana, Wheeler Oakman	Drama	Metro
The False Faces	Irvin Willat	Henry B. Walthall, Lon Chaney	Drama	Paramount
A Favor to a Friend	John Ince	Emmy Wehlen, Jack Mulhall	Comedy	Metro
The Fear Woman	John A. Barry	Pauline Frederick, Milton Sills	Drama	Goldwyn
The Feud	Edward LeSaint	Tom Mix, Eva Novak	Drama	Fox Film
A Fight for Love	John Ford	Harry Carey, Neva Gerber	Western	Universal
A Fighting Colleen	David Smith	Bessie Love, Anne Schaefer	Comedy-drama	Vitagraph
Fighting Cressy	Robert Thornby	Blanche Sweet, Russell Simpson	Western	Pathé Exchange
Fighting Destiny	Paul Scardon	Harry T. Morey, Betty Blythe	Drama	Vitagraph
Fighting for Gold	Edward LeSaint	Tom Mix, Teddy Sampson	Western	Fox Film
The Final Close-Up	Walter Edwards	Shirley Mason, Francis McDonald	Drama	Paramount
The Fire Flingers	Rupert Julian	Fred Kelsey, Jane Novak	Thriller	Universal
Fires of Faith	Edward José	Catherine Calvert, Eugene O'Brien, Rubye De Remer	Drama	Paramount
The Firing Line	Charles Maigne	Irene Castle, Isabel West, Vernon Steele	Drama	Paramount
Flame of the Desert	Reginald Barker	Geraldine Farrar, Lou Tellegen	Drama	Goldwyn
The Follies Girl	John Francis Dillon	Olive Thomas, Wallace MacDonald	Comedy	Triangle
Fools and Their Money	Herbert Blaché	Emmy Wehlen, Jack Mulhall	Comedy	Metro
For a Woman's Honor	Park Frame	H. B. Warner, Marguerite De La Motte, John Gilbert	Drama	Robertson-Cole
For Better, For Worse	Cecil B. DeMille	Elliott Dexter, Gloria Swanson	Drama	Paramount
Forbidden	Lois Weber	Mildred Harris, Fred Goodwins	Drama	Universal
The Forbidden Room	Lynn Reynolds	Gladys Brockwell, William Scott	Drama	Fox Film
The Forfeit	Frank Powell	House Peters, Hector V. Sarno	Western	Pathé Exchange
The Four Flusher	Harry L. Franklin	Hale Hamilton, Ruth Stonehouse	Comedy	Metro
Fruits of Passion	George Ridgwell	Alice Mann, Donald Hall	Drama	Triangle
A Fugitive from Matrimony	Henry King	H. B. Warner, Seena Owen	Comedy	Robertson-Cole
Full of Pep	Harry L. Franklin	Hale Hamilton, Alice Lake	Comedy	Metro

== G ==
Title	Director	Cast	Genre	Note
The Gamblers	Paul Scardon	Harry T. Morey, Agnes Ayres	Drama	Vitagraph
Gambling in Souls	Harry F. Millarde	Madlaine Traverse, Herbert Heyes	Drama	Fox Film
The Game's Up	Elsie Jane Wilson	Albert Ray, Ruth Clifford	Comedy	Universal
Gates of Brass	Ernest C. Warde	Frank Keenan, Lois Wilson	Crime	Pathé Exchange
The Gay Lord Quex	Harry Beaumont	Tom Moore, Gloria Hope, Naomi Childers	Drama	Goldwyn
A Gentleman of Quality	James Young	Earle Williams, Kathryn Adams	Drama	Vitagraph
Getting Mary Married	Allan Dwan	Marion Davies, Norman Kerry	Comedy	Independent
A Girl at Bay	Thomas R. Mills	Corinne Griffith, Walter Miller	Mystery	Vitagraph
The Girl Dodger	Jerome Storm	Charles Ray, Doris May	Comedy	Paramount
The Girl from Outside	Reginald Barker	Clara Horton, Cullen Landis	Drama	Goldwyn
A Girl in Bohemia	Howard M. Mitchell	Peggy Hyland, Josef Swickard	Drama	Fox Film
The Girl Problem	Kenneth S. Webb	Corinne Griffith, Agnes Ayres	Drama	Vitagraph
The Girl Who Stayed at Home	D. W. Griffith	Adolf Lestina, Carol Dempster	Drama	Paramount
The Girl with No Regrets	Harry Millarde	Peggy Hyland, Harry von Meter	Drama	Fox Film
The Girl-Woman	Thomas R. Mills	Gladys Leslie, Maurice Costello	Drama	Vitagraph
Girls	Walter Edwards	Marguerite Clark, Helene Chadwick	Romantic comedy	Paramount
The Glorious Lady	George Irving	Olive Thomas, Matt Moore, Evelyn Brent	Drama	Selznick
God's Outlaw	Christy Cabanne	Francis X. Bushman, Helen Dunbar	Western	Metro
The Gold Cure	John H. Collins	Viola Dana, Jack McGowan	Comedy	Metro
The Golden Shower	John W. Noble	Frank Morgan, Estelle Taylor	Drama	Vitagraph
Good Gracious, Annabelle	George Melford	Billie Burke, Herbert Rawlinson	Comedy	Paramount
The Gray Horizon	William Worthington	Sessue Hayakawa, Eileen Percy	Drama	Robertson-Cole
The Gray Towers Mystery	John W. Noble	Gladys Leslie, Frank Morgan	Western	Vitagraph
The Gray Wolf's Ghost	Park Frame	H. B. Warner, Marin Sais	Mystery	Robertson-Cole
Greased Lightning	Jerome Storm	Charles Ray, Wanda Hawley	Comedy	Paramount
The Great Air Robbery	Jacques Jaccard	Ormer Locklear, Allan Forrest	Drama	Universal
The Great Romance	Henry Otto	Harold Lockwood, Rubye De Remer	Adventure	Metro
The Great Victory	Charles Miller	Creighton Hale, Helen Ferguson	War drama	Metro
The Greatest Question	D. W. Griffith	Lillian Gish, Robert Harron, Ralph Graves	Drama	First National
The Grim Game	Irvin Willat	Harry Houdini, Thomas Jefferson	Drama	Paramount
A Gun Fightin' Gentleman	John Ford	Harry Carey, J. Barney Sherry	Western	Universal

== H ==
Title	Director	Cast	Genre	Note
Happiness a la Mode	Walter Edwards	Constance Talmadge, Harrison Ford	Comedy	Selznick
Happy Though Married	Fred Niblo	Enid Bennett, Hallam Cooley	Comedy	Paramount
Hard Boiled	Victor Schertzinger	Dorothy Dalton, William Courtright	Comedy	Paramount
The Haunted Bedroom	Fred Niblo	Enid Bennett, Jack Nelson	Drama	Paramount
Haunting Shadows	Henry King	H. B. Warner, Margaret Livingston	Comedy drama	Robertson-Cole
Hawthorne of the U.S.A.	James Cruze	Wallace Reid, Lila Lee	Comedy	Paramount
Hay Foot, Straw Foot	Jerome Storm	Charles Ray, Doris May	Comedy	Paramount
A Heart in Pawn	William Worthington	Sessue Hayakawa, Vola Vale	Drama	Robertson-Cole
Heart o' the Hills	Joseph De Grasse, Sidney Franklin	Mary Pickford, Harold Goodwin	Drama	First National
Heart of Juanita	George E. Middleton	Beatriz Michelena, Andrew Robson	Western	Robertson-Cole
The Heart of Wetona	Sidney Franklin	Norma Talmadge, Fred Huntley	Western	Independent
The Heart of Youth	Robert G. Vignola	Lila Lee, Tom Forman	Comedy	Paramount
Hearts Asleep	Howard Hickman	Bessie Barriscale, Vola Vale	Crime	Robertson-Cole
Heartsease	Harry Beaumont	Tom Moore, Helene Chadwick	Drama	Goldwyn
Hell-Roarin' Reform	Edward LeSaint	Tom Mix, Kathleen O'Connor	Western	Fox Film
The Hellion	George L. Cox	Margarita Fischer, Emory Johnson	Drama	Pathé Exchange
Help! Help! Police!	Edward Dillon	George Walsh, Eric Mayne	Comedy	Fox Film
Her Code of Honor	John M. Stahl	Florence Reed, William Desmond	Drama	Independent
Her Kingdom of Dreams	Marshall Neilan	Anita Stewart, Anna Q. Nilsson	Drama	First National
Her Purchase Price	Howard C. Hickman	Bessie Barriscale, Alan Roscoe	Romance	Robertson-Cole
Here Comes the Bride	John S. Robertson	John Barrymore, Frank Losee	Comedy	Paramount
The Highest Trump	James Young	Earle Williams, Grace Darmond	War drama	Vitagraph
His Debt	William Worthington	Sessue Hayakawa, Jane Novak	Drama	Robertson-Cole
His Divorced Wife	Douglas Gerrard	Monroe Salisbury, Charles Le Moyne	Drama	Universal
His Majesty, the American	Joseph Henabery	Douglas Fairbanks, Marjorie Daw	Comedy	United Artists
His Official Fiancée	Robert G. Vignola	Vivian Martin, Forrest Stanley, Vera Sisson	Comedy	Paramount
His Parisian Wife	Emile Chautard	Elsie Ferguson, David Powell	Romance	Paramount
His Wife's Friend	Joseph De Grasse	Dorothy Dalton, Warren Cook	Mystery	Paramount
The Homebreaker	Victor Schertzinger	Dorothy Dalton, Douglas MacLean	Comedy	Paramount
Home	Lois Weber	Mildred Harris, Frank Elliott	Drama	Universal
The Home Town Girl	Robert G. Vignola	Vivian Martin, Ralph Graves	Comedy	Paramount
The Hoodlum	Sidney Franklin	Mary Pickford, Ralph Lewis, Kenneth Harlan	Comedy	First National
Hoop-La	Louis Chaudet	Billie Rhodes, Bertram Grassby	Comedy	Robertson-Cole
Hornet's Nest	James Young	Earle Williams, Vola Vale	Drama	Vitagraph
A House Divided	J. Stuart Blackton	Sylvia Breamer, Herbert Rawlinson	Drama	Independent
The House of Intrigue	Lloyd Ingraham	Mignon Anderson, Lloyd Bacon	Crime	Robertson-Cole
Human Desire	Wilfrid North	Anita Stewart, Conway Tearle, Vernon Steele	Drama	First National
The Hushed Hour	Edmund Mortimer	Blanche Sweet, Milton Sills	Drama	Independent

== I ==
Title	Director	Cast	Genre	Note
The Illustrious Prince	William Worthington	Sessue Hayakawa, Mabel Ballin	Drama	Robertson-Cole
I'll Get Him Yet	Elmer Clifton	Dorothy Gish, Richard Barthelmess	Comedy	Paramount
The Imp	Robert Ellis	Elsie Janis, Joe King	Crime	Selznick
Impossible Catherine	John B. O'Brien	Virginia Pearson, William B. Davidson	Comedy	Pathé Exchange
In for Thirty Days	Webster Cullison	May Allison, Robert Ellis	Comedy	Metro
In His Brother's Place	Harry L. Franklin	Hale Hamilton, Marguerite Snow	Comedy drama	Metro
In Honor's Web	Paul Scardon	Harry T. Morey, Agnes Ayres	Drama	Vitagraph
In Mizzoura	Hugh Ford	Noah Beery, Eileen Percy, Monte Blue	Western	Paramount
In Old Kentucky	Marshall Neilan	Anita Stewart, Mahlon Hamilton	Romance	First National
In Wrong	James Kirkwood	Jack Pickford, Marguerite De La Motte	Comedy	First National
The Indestructible Wife	Charles Maigne	Alice Brady, Anne Cornwall, Percy Marmont	Romantic comedy	Independent
The Intrusion of Isabel	Lloyd Ingraham	Mary Miles Minter, Allan Forrest	Comedy	Pathé Exchange
The Invisible Bond	Charles Maigne	Irene Castle, Huntley Gordon, Claire Adams	Drama	Paramount
The Island of Intrigue	Henry Otto	May Allison, Jack Mower	Drama	Metro
The Isle of Conquest	Edward José	Norma Talmadge, Wyndham Standing, Charles K. Gerrard	Drama	Independent
It Pays to Advertise	Donald Crisp	Bryant Washburn, Lois Wilson	Drama	Paramount
It's a Bear	Lawrence C. Windom	Taylor Holmes, Vivian Reed	Comedy	Triangle

== J ==
Title	Director	Cast	Genre	Note
Jacques of the Silver North	Norval MacGregor	Mitchell Lewis, Fritzi Brunette	Drama	Independent
Jane Goes A' Wooing	George Melford	Vivian Martin, Niles Welch	Drama	Paramount
Jinx	Victor Schertzinger	Mabel Normand, Ogden Crane	Comedy	Goldwyn
John Petticoats	Lambert Hillyer	William S. Hart, Ethel Shannon	Action	Paramount
Johnny Get Your Gun	Donald Crisp	Fred Stone, James Cruze	Comedy	Paramount
Johnny-on-the-Spot	Harry L. Franklin	Hale Hamilton, Louise Lovely, Philo McCullough	Comedy	Metro
Josselyn's Wife	Howard C. Hickman	Bessie Barriscale, Nigel Barrie	Drama	Robertson-Cole
The Joyous Liar	Ernest C. Warde	J. Warren Kerrigan, Lillian Walker	Comedy crime	Pathé Exchange
Jubilo	Clarence G. Badger	Will Rogers, Josie Sedgwick	Comedy	Goldwyn
The Jungle Trail	Richard Stanton	William Farnum, Anna Luther	Adventure	Fox Film
Just Squaw	George E. Middleton	Beatriz Michelena, Andrew Robson	Western	Robertson-Cole

== K ==
Title	Director	Cast	Genre	Note
Kathleen Mavourneen	Charles J. Brabin	Theda Bara, Raymond McKee	Drama	Fox Film
Kitty Kelly, M.D.	Howard Hickman	Bessie Barriscale, Jack Holt	Comedy	Robertson-Cole
The Knickerbocker Buckaroo	Albert Parker	Douglas Fairbanks, William Wellman	Western	Paramount

== L ==
Title	Director	Cast	Genre	Note
The Lady of Red Butte	Victor Schertzinger	Dorothy Dalton, Tully Marshall	Western	Paramount
Lasca	Norman Dawn	Frank Mayo, Edith Roberts	Western	Universal
The Last of the Duanes	J. Gordon Edwards	William Farnum, Louise Lovely	Western	Fox Film
The Last of His People	Robert N. Bradbury	Mitchell Lewis, Harry Lonsdale	Drama	Selznick
The Law of Men	Fred Niblo	Enid Bennett, Niles Welch	Drama	Paramount
Leave It to Susan	Clarence G. Badger	Madge Kennedy, Wallace MacDonald	Comedy western	Goldwyn
Let's Elope	John S. Robertson	Marguerite Clark, Gaston Glass	Comedy	Paramount
The Life Line	Maurice Tourneur	Jack Holt, Wallace Beery	Drama	Paramount
Life's a Funny Proposition	Thomas N. Heffron	William Desmond, Louise Lovely	Comedy	Robertson-Cole
The Light	J. Gordon Edwards	Theda Bara, Robert D. Walker	Romance	Fox Film
The Light of Victory	William Wolbert	Monroe Salisbury, Betty Compson	War	Universal
The Lincoln Highwayman	Emmett J. Flynn	William Russell, Frank Brownlee	Mystery	FOx
The Lion and the Mouse	Tom Terriss	Alice Joyce, Conrad Nagel, Anders Randolf	Drama	Vitagraph
The Lion's Den	George D. Baker	Bert Lytell, Alice Lake	Drama	Metro
A Little Brother of the Rich	Lynn Reynolds	Frank Mayo, Lila Leslie, John Gilbert	Drama	Universal
Little Comrade	Chester Withey	Vivian Martin, Niles Welch	Comedy	Paramount
The Little Boss	David Smith	Bessie Love, Wallace MacDonald	Romantic comedy	Vitagraph
The Little Diplomat	Stuart Paton	Marie Osborne, Lydia Knott	Comedy	Pathé Exchange
The Little White Savage	Paul Powell	Carmel Myers, Harry Hilliard	Comedy drama	Universal
Lombardi, Ltd.	Jack Conway	Bert Lytell, Alice Lake	Comedy	Metro
The Lone Star Ranger	J. Gordon Edwards	William Farnum, Louise Lovely	Western	Fox Film
The Lone Wolf's Daughter	William P. S. Earle	Bertram Grassby, Louise Glaum	Crime Thriller	Pathé Exchange
The Long Arm of Mannister	Bertram Bracken	Henry B. Walthall, Helene Chadwick	Drama	Independent
The Long Lane's Turning	Louis Chaudet	Henry B. Walthall, Mary Charleson	Drama	Robertson-Cole
Loot	William C. Dowlan	Ora Carew, Joseph W. Girard	Crime	Universal
Lord and Lady Algy	Harry Beaumont	Tom Moore, Naomi Childers	Comedy	Goldwyn
The Lord Loves the Irish	Ernest C. Warde	J. Warren Kerrigan, Aggie Herring, James O. Barrows	Comedy	Hodkinson
The Lost Battalion	Burton L. King	Helen Ferguson, Gaston Glass	War	Independent
Lost Money	Edmund Lawrence	Madlaine Traverse, Henry Hebert	Drama	Fox Film
The Lost Princess	Scott R. Dunlap	Albert Ray, Elinor Fair	Comedy	Fox Film
The Lottery Man	James Cruze	Wallace Reid, Wanda Hawley	Comedy	Paramount
Louisiana	Robert G. Vignola	Vivian Martin, Noah Beery	Comedy	Paramount
Love and the Woman	Tefft Johnson	June Elvidge, Donald Hall	Drama	World
The Love Auction	Edmund Lawrence	Virginia Pearson, Hugh Thompson	Drama	Fox Film
The Love Burglar	James Cruze	Wallace Reid, Anna Q. Nilsson, Raymond Hatton	Drama	Paramount
The Love Cheat	George Archainbaud	June Caprice, Creighton Hale	Drama	Pathé Exchange
The Love Hunger	William P.S. Earle	Lillian Walker, Lee Shumway, Herbert Prior	Comedy	Hodkinson
Love in a Hurry	Dell Henderson	Carlyle Blackwell, Evelyn Greeley, George MacQuarrie	Drama	World
Love Is Love	Scott R. Dunlap	Albert Ray, Elinor Fair	Crime	Fox Film
Love Insurance	Donald Crisp	Bryant Washburn, Lois Wilson, Theodore Roberts	Comedy	Paramount
The Loves of Letty	Frank Lloyd	Pauline Frederick, John Bowers	Drama	Goldwyn
Love's Prisoner	John Francis Dillon	Olive Thomas, Ann Kroman	Crime drama	Triangle
The Love That Dares	Harry Millarde	Madlaine Traverse, Tom Santschi	Drama	Fox Film
Luck and Pluck	Edward Dillon	George Walsh, Virginia Lee	Drama	Vitagraph
Luck in Pawn	Walter Edwards	Marguerite Clark, Charles Meredith	Romance	Paramount
The Lure of Ambition	Edmund Lawrence	Theda Bara, Thurlow Bergen	Romance	Fox Film

== M ==
Title	Director	Cast	Genre	Note
Maggie Pepper	Chester Withey	Ethel Clayton, Elliott Dexter	Comedy	Paramount
Male and Female	Cecil B. DeMille	Gloria Swanson, Thomas Meighan	Adventure	Paramount
A Man and His Money	Harry Beaumont	Tom Moore, Seena Owen	Comedy	Goldwyn
The Man Beneath	William Worthington	Sessue Hayakawa, Helen Jerome Eddy, John Gilbert	Crime drama	Independent
The Man Hunter	Frank Lloyd	William Farnum, Louise Lovely, Charles Clary	Western	Fox Film
The Man in the Moonlight	Paul Powell	Monroe Salisbury, Colleen Moore	Drama	Universal
A Man of Honor	Fred J. Balshofer	Harold Lockwood, Bessie Eyton	Drama	Metro
The Man Who Stayed at Home	Herbert Blache	King Baggot, Claire Whitney	Drama	Metro
The Man Who Turned White	Park Frame	H. B. Warner, Barbara Castleton	Adventure	Robertson-Cole
The Man Who Won	Paul Scardon	Harry T. Morey, Maurice Costello, Betty Blythe	Drama	Vitagraph
A Man's Country	Henry Kolker	Alma Rubens, Alan Roscoe, Lon Chaney	Western	Robertson-Cole
Man's Desire	Lloyd Ingraham	Lewis Stone, Jane Novak	Drama	Robertson-Cole
A Man's Fight	Thomas N. Heffron	Dustin Farnum, Harry von Meter	Drama	Independent
Marked Men	John Ford	Harry Carey, Charles Le Moyne	Western	Universal
The Market of Souls	Joe De Grasse	Dorothy Dalton, Holmes Herbert, Philo McCullough	Drama	Paramount
Marie, Ltd.	Kenneth S. Webb	Alice Brady, Frank Losee	Comedy	Independent
The Marriage Price	Emile Chautard	Elsie Ferguson, Wyndham Standing, Lionel Atwill	Romance	Paramount
Married in Haste	Arthur Rosson	Albert Ray, Elinor Fair	Comedy	Fox Film
Mary Regan	Lois Weber	Anita Stewart, Frank Mayo	Crime	First National
The Mayor of Filbert	Christy Cabanne	Jack Richardson, Belle Bennett	Drama	Triangle
Me and Captain Kidd	Oscar Apfel	Evelyn Greeley, Raymond McKee	Comedy	Independent
Men, Women, and Money	George Melford	Ethel Clayton, James Neill	Drama	Paramount
The Merry-Go-Round	Edmund Lawrence	Peggy Hyland, Jack Mulhall	Comedy	Fox Film
The Microbe	Henry Otto	Viola Dana, Kenneth Harlan, Arthur Maude	Comedy drama	Metro
A Midnight Romance	Lois Weber	Anita Stewart, Jack Holt	Drama	First National
The Millionaire Pirate	Rupert Julian	Monroe Salisbury, Ruth Clifford	Fantasy	Universal
The Mind-the-Paint Girl	Wilfrid North	Anita Stewart, Conway Tearle, Vernon Steele	Drama	Vitagraph
The Mints of Hell	Park Frame	William Desmond, Vivian Rich	Drama	Robertson-Cole
The Miracle Man	George Loane Tucker	Lon Chaney, Betty Compson	Drama	Paramount
The Miracle of Love	Robert Z. Leonard	Lucy Cotton, Wyndham Standing	Drama	Paramount
The Misleading Widow	John S. Robertson	Billie Burke, Madelyn Clare	Comedy	Paramount
Miss Adventure	Lynn Reynolds	Peggy Hyland, Gertrude Messinger	Adventure	Fox Film
Miss Dulcie from Dixie	Joseph Gleason	Gladys Leslie, Julia Swayne Gordon	Drama	Vitagraph
Modern Husbands	Francis J. Grandon	Henry B. Walthall, Claire Du Brey	Drama	Robertson-Cole
Molly of the Follies	Edward Sloman	Margarita Fischer, Jack Mower	Comedy	Pathé Exchange
The Money Corral	Lambert Hillyer	William S. Hart, Jane Novak, Herschel Mayall	Adventure	Paramount
The Moonshine Trail	J. Stuart Blackton	Sylvia Breamer, Julia Swayne Gordon	Drama	Pathé Exchange
The Moral Deadline	Travers Vale	June Elvidge, Frank Mayo	Drama	Independent
More Deadly Than the Male	Robert G. Vignola	Ethel Clayton, Herbert Heyes	Comedy	Paramount
Mrs. Wiggs of the Cabbage Patch	Hugh Ford	Marguerite Clark, Mary Carr	Comedy	Paramount
My Little Sister	Kenean Buel	Evelyn Nesbit, Leslie Austin	Drama	Fox Film

== N ==
Title	Director	Cast	Genre	Note
Never Say Quit	Edward Dillon	George Walsh, Jean Acker	Comedy	Fox Film
The New Moon	Chester Withey	Norma Talmadge, Pedro de Cordoba, Charles K. Gerrard	Adventure	Independent
Nobody Home	Elmer Clifton	Dorothy Gish, George Fawcett, Ralph Graves	Comedy	Paramount
Nugget Nell	Elmer Clifton	Dorothy Gish, David Butler	Comedy	Paramount

== O ==
Title	Director	Cast	Genre	Note
The Oakdale Affair	Oscar Apfel	Evelyn Greeley, Eric Mayne	Adventure	Independent
Oh Boy!	Albert Capellani	June Caprice, Creighton Hale, Zena Keefe	Comedy	Pathé Exchange
Oh, You Women!	John Emerson	Gaston Glass, Louise Huff	Comedy	Paramount
One of the Finest	Harry Beaumont	Tom Moore, Seena Owen	Comedy	Goldwyn
One-Thing-At-a-Time O'Day	John Ince	Bert Lytell, Eileen Percy	Romantic comedy	Metro
One Week of Life	Hobart Henley	Pauline Frederick, Thomas Holding	Drama	Goldwyn
The Open Door	Dallas M. Fitzgerald	Anna Lehr, Walter Miller	Drama	Robertson-Cole
Open Your Eyes	Gilbert P. Hamilton	Viola Allen, Ben Lyon	Drama	Warner Bros.
The Other Half	King Vidor	Florence Vidor, David Butler	Drama	Robertson-Cole
Other Men's Wives	Victor Schertzinger	Dorothy Dalton, Forrest Stanley, Holmes Herbert	Drama	Paramount
Our Better Selves	George Fitzmaurice	Fannie Ward, Lew Cody	War drama	Pathé Exchange
Out of the Fog	Albert Capellani	Alla Nazimova, Charles Bryant	Drama	Metro
Out of the Shadow	Emile Chautard	Pauline Frederick, Wyndham Standing	Mystery	Paramount
Out Yonder	Ralph Ince	Olive Thomas, Huntley Gordon	Drama	Selznick
The Outcasts of Poker Flat	John Ford	Harry Carey, Cullen Landis, Gloria Hope	Western	Universal
Over the Garden Wall	David Smith	Bessie Love, Otto Lederer	Comedy	Vitagraph

== P–Q ==
Title	Director	Cast	Genre	Note
The Pagan God	Park Frame	H.B. Warner, Carmen Phillips	Drama	Robertson-Cole
Paid in Advance	Allen Holubar	Dorothy Phillips, Lon Chaney	Drama	Universal
Paid in Full	Emile Chautard	Pauline Frederick, Wyndham Standing	Drama	Paramount
The Painted World	Ralph Ince	Julia Swayne Gordon, Harry Northrup	Drama	Vitagraph
The Parisian Tigress	Herbert Blaché	Viola Dana, Henry Kolker	Drama	Paramount
Partners Three	Fred Niblo	Enid Bennett, Casson Ferguson	Western	Paramount
The Peace of Roaring River	Hobart Henley, Victor Schertzinger	Pauline Frederick, Hardee Kirkland	Western	Goldwyn
Peg o' My Heart	William C. de Mille	Wanda Hawley, Thomas Meighan	Comedy	Paramount
Peggy Does Her Darndest	George D. Baker	May Allison, Rosemary Theby	Comedy	Metro
Peppy Polly	Elmer Clifton	Dorothy Gish, Richard Barthelmess	Drana	Paramount
The Perfect Lover	Ralph Ince	Eugene O'Brien, Mary Boland	Drama	Selznick
Perils of Thunder Mountain	Robert N. Bradbury	Antonio Moreno, Carol Holloway	Adventure	Vitagraph
The Pest	Christy Cabanne	Mabel Normand, John Bowers, Charles K. Gerrard	Comedy	Goldwyn
A Petal on the Current	Tod Browning	Mary MacLaren, Gertrude Claire	Drama	Universal
Pettigrew's Girl	George Melford	Ethel Clayton, Monte Blue, Charles K. Gerrard	Drama	Paramount
Piccadilly Jim	Wesley Ruggles	Owen Moore, Zena Keefe	Comedy	Selznick
Pitfalls of a Big City	Frank Lloyd	Gladys Brockwell, Neva Gerber	Drama	Fox Film
The Pleasant Devil	Christy Cabanne, Louis J. Gasnier	Lew Cody, Eileen Percy	Comedy	Robertson-Cole
Please Get Married	John Ince	Viola Dana, Antrim Short	Drama	Metro
The Pointing Finger	Edward A. Kull	Mary MacLaren, David Butler	Drama	Universal
The Poor Boob	Donald Crisp	Bryant Washburn, Wanda Hawley	Comedy	Paramount
Poor Relations	King Vidor	Florence Vidor, William De Vaull	Drama	Robertson-Cole
The Poppy Girl's Husband	Lambert Hillyer	William S. Hart, Juanita Hansen	Crime	Paramount
Pretty Smooth	Rollin S. Sturgeon	Priscilla Dean, Francis McDonald	Comedy	Universal
The Price of Innocence	Frank Kugler	Anders Randolf, Margaret Campbell	Drama	First National
The Prince and Betty	Robert Thornby	William Desmond, Mary Thurman	Comedy	Pathé Exchange
The Probation Wife	Sidney Franklin	Norma Talmadge, Thomas Meighan	Comedy	Independent
The Prodigal Liar	Thomas N. Heffron	William Desmond, Betty Compson	Western	Robertson-Cole
The Profiteers	George Fitzmaurice	Fannie Ward, Edwin Stevens	Drama	Pathé Exchange
Prudence on Broadway	Frank Borzage	Olive Thomas, Francis McDonald	Comedy	Triangle
Puppy Love	Roy William Neill	Lila Lee, Edna Murphy	Comedy	Paramount
Put Up Your Hands!	Edward Sloman	Margarita Fischer, Emory Johnson	Comedy	Pathé Exchange
Putting It Over	Donald Crisp	Bryant Washburn, Shirley Mason	Comedy	Paramount
Putting One Over	Edward Dillon	George Walsh, Matthew Betz	Drama	Fox Film
The Quickening Flame	Travers Vale	Montagu Love, June Elvidge	Drama	Independent

== R ==
Title	Director	Cast	Genre	Note
The Railroader	Colin Campbell	George Fawcett, Virginia True Boardman, Fritzi Brunette	Drama	Triangle
Ravished Armenia	Oscar Apfel	Aurora Mardiganian, Irving Cummings	Drama	First National
The Rebellious Bride	Lynn Reynolds	Peggy Hyland, George Nichols	Comedy	Fox Film
Red Hot Dollars	Jerome Storm	Charles Ray, Gladys George	Drama	Paramount
The Red Lantern	Albert Capellani	Alla Nazimova, Noah Beery	Drama	Metro
The Red Viper	Jacques Tyrol	Gareth Hughes, Ruth Stonehouse, John Gilbert	Drama	Independent
The Redhead	Charles Maigne	Alice Brady, Conrad Nagel	Romance	Independent
A Regular Girl	James Young	Elsie Janis, Matt Moore	Comedy	Selznick
The Rescuing Angel	Walter Edwards	Shirley Mason, Forrest Stanley	Comedy	Paramount
Restless Souls	William C. Dowlan	Alma Rubens, Jack Conway	Drama	Triangle
Rider of the Law	John Ford	Harry Carey, Gloria Hope	Western	Universal
Riders of Vengeance	John Ford	Harry Carey, Seena Owen	Western	Universal
The Right to Happiness	Allen Holubar	Dorothy Phillips, Winter Hall	Drama	Universal
The Right to Lie	Edwin Carewe	Dolores Cassinelli, Joe King	Drama	Pathé Exchange
The Roaring Road	James Cruze	Wallace Reid, Ann Little	Romance	Paramount
A Rogue's Romance	James Young	Earle Williams, Harry von Meter	Crime drama	Vitagraph
Romance and Arabella	Walter Edwards	Constance Talmadge, Harrison Ford	Comedy	Selznick
A Romance of Happy Valley	D. W. Griffith	Lillian Gish, Robert Harron	Drama	Paramount
Roped	John Ford	Harry Carey, Neva Gerber	Western	Universal
Rose o' the River	Robert Thornby	Lila Lee, George Fisher	Drama	Paramount
Rose of the West	Harry F. Millarde	Madlaine Traverse, Tom Santschi	Drama	Fox Film
The Rough Neck	Oscar Apfel	Montagu Love, Barbara Castleton	Drama	World
Rough-Riding Romance	Arthur Rosson	Tom Mix, Juanita Hansen	Western	Fox Film
Rustling a Bride	Irvin Willat	Lila Lee, Monte Blue	Comedy western	Paramount

== S ==
Title	Director	Cast	Genre	Note
Sacred Silence	Harry F. Millarde	Agnes Ayres, George MacQuarrie	Drama	Fox Film
Sadie Love	John S. Robertson	Billie Burke, Hedda Hopper	Comedy	Paramount
A Sagebrush Hamlet	Joseph Franz	William Desmond, Marguerite De La Motte	Western	Robertson-Cole
Sahara	Arthur Rosson	Louise Glaum, Matt Moore	Drama	Pathé Exchange
Satan Junior	Herbert Blaché	Viola Dana, Milton Sills	Comedy	Metro
Scarlet Days	D. W. Griffith	Richard Barthelmess, Eugenie Besserer	Western	Paramount
The Scarlet Shadow	Robert Z. Leonard	Mae Murray, Ralph Graves	Comedy	Universal
A Scream in the Night	Leander De Cordova, Burton L. King	Ralph Kellard, John Webb Dillion	Drama	Selznick
The Sealed Envelope	Douglas Gerrard	Fritzi Brunette, Joseph W. Girard	Mystery	Universal
Sealed Hearts	Ralph Ince	Eugene O'Brien, Robert Edeson	Drama	Selznick
Secret Service	Hugh Ford	Robert Warwick, Wanda Hawley	War	Paramount
Shadows	Reginald Barker	Geraldine Farrar, Milton Sills	Drama	Goldwyn
Shadows of Suspicion	Edwin Carewe	Harold Lockwood, Naomi Childers	Drama	Metro
Shadows of the Past	Ralph Ince	Anita Stewart, Harry T. Morey	Drama	Vitagraph
The Sheriff's Son	Victor Schertzinger	Charles Ray, Seena Owen	Western	Paramount
Should a Husband Forgive?	Raoul Walsh	Miriam Cooper, Eric Mayne	Drama	Fox Film
Should a Woman Tell?	John Ince	Alice Lake, Jack Mulhall	Drama	Metro
Silent Strength	Paul Scardon	Harry T. Morey, Betty Blythe	Drama	Vitagraph
The Silk-Lined Burglar	John Francis Dillon	Priscilla Dean, Ashton Dearholt	Mystery	Universal
The Silver King	George Irving	William Faversham, Barbara Castleton	Drama	Paramount
The Silver Girl	Frank Keenan	Frank Keenan, Irene Rich	Comedy	Pathé Exchange
The Siren's Song	J. Gordon Edwards	Theda Bara, Alan Roscoe	Drama	Fox Film
Sis Hopkins	Clarence G. Badger	Mabel Normand, John Bowers, Sam De Grasse	Comedy	Goldwyn
Six Feet Four	Henry King	William Russell, Vola Vale	Western	Pathé Exchange
The Sleeping Lion	Rupert Julian	Monroe Salisbury, Rhea Mitchell	Western	Universal
Smiles	Arvid E. Gillstrom	Jane Lee, Katherine Lee	Comedy	Fox Film
Snares of Paris	Howard M. Mitchell	Madlaine Traverse, Charles Arling	Drama	Fox Film
The Sneak	Edward LeSaint	Gladys Brockwell, William Scott	Drama	Fox Film
The Social Pirate	Dell Henderson	June Elvidge, Laura Burt, Ned Sparks	Drama	World
A Society Exile	George Fitzmaurice	Elsie Ferguson, Zeffie Tilbury	Drama	Paramount
Soldiers of Fortune	Allan Dwan	Wallace Beery, Ogden Crane	Adventure	Independent
Some Bride	Henry Otto	Viola Dana, Irving Cummings	Comedy	Metro
Some Liar	Henry King	William Russell, Eileen Percy	Western comedy	Pathé Exchange
Something to Do	Donald Crisp	Bryant Washburn, Ann Little, Charles K. Gerrard	Comedy	Paramount
The Spark Divine	Tom Terriss	Alice Joyce, Eulalie Jensen	Drama	Vitagraph
Speedy Meade	Ira M. Lowry	Katherine MacDonald, Claire Adams	Western	Goldwyn
The Speed Maniac	Edward LeSaint	Tom Mix, Eva Novak	Western	Fox Film
The Spender	Charles Swickard	Bert Lytell, William V. Mong	Comedy	Metro
The Spite Bride	Charles Giblyn	Olive Thomas, Jack Mulhall	Drama	Selznick
The Spitfire of Seville	George Siegmann	Hedda Nova, Thurston Hall	Drama	Universal
The Splendid Sin	Howard M. Mitchell	Madlaine Traverse, Charles Clary	Drama	Fox Film
A Sporting Chance	George Melford	Ethel Clayton, Jack Holt, Anna Q. Nilsson	Comedy	Paramount
A Sporting Chance	Henry King	William Russell, Fritzi Brunette	Drama	Paramount
Spotlight Sadie	Laurence Trimble	Mae Marsh, Wallace MacDonald	Drama	Goldwyn
Square Deal Sanderson	Lambert Hillyer	William S. Hart, Ann Little	Western	Paramount
The Steel King	Oscar Apfel	Montagu Love, June Elvidge	Drama	Independent
Stepping Out	Fred Niblo	Enid Bennett, Niles Welch	Drama	Paramount
A Stitch in Time	Ralph Ince	Agnes Ayres, Gladys Leslie	Comedy	Vitagraph
Strictly Confidential	Clarence G. Badger	Madge Kennedy, John Bowers	Comedy	Goldwyn
The Stronger Vow	Reginald Barker	Geraldine Farrar, Milton Sills	Drama	Goldwyn
Sue of the South	Eugene Moore	Edith Roberts, George Hackathorne	Drama	Universal
The Sundown Trail	Rollin S. Sturgeon	Monroe Salisbury, Carl Stockdale	Western	Universal

== T ==
Title	Director	Cast	Genre	Note
Tangled Threads	Howard C. Hickman	Rosemary Theby, Nigel Barrie	Drama	Robertson-Cole
A Taste of Life	John Francis Dillon	Edith Roberts, Billy Mason	Comedy	Universal
The Teeth of the Tiger	Chester Withey	David Powell, Marguerite Courtot	Comedy	Paramount
A Temperamental Wife	David Kirkland	Constance Talmadge, Wyndham Standing	Comedy	First National
The Test of Honor	John S. Robertson	John Barrymore, Constance Binney	Drama	Paramount
That's Good	Harry L. Franklin	Hale Hamilton, Herbert Prior	Comedy	Metro
Thieves	Frank Beal	Gladys Brockwell, William Scott	Crime	Fox Film
Thin Ice	Thomas R. Mills	Corinne Griffith, Charles Kent	Drama	Vitagraph
The Third Degree	Tom Terriss	Alice Joyce, Anders Randolf, Hedda Hopper	Crime	Vitagraph
The Third Kiss	Robert G. Vignola	Vivian Martin, Harrison Ford	Comedy	Paramount
The Thirteenth Chair	Léonce Perret	Creighton Hale, Marie Shotwell	Mystery	Pathe Exchange
This Hero Stuff	Henry King	William Russell, Winifred Westover	Western comedy	Pathé Exchange
Thou Shalt Not	Charles Brabin	Evelyn Nesbit, Crauford Kent	Drama	Fox Film
Three Green Eyes	Dell Henderson	Carlyle Blackwell, Evelyn Greeley, Montagu Love	Comedy	World
Three Men and a Girl	Marshall Neilan	Marguerite Clarlk, Richard Barthelmess, Percy Marmont	Romantic comedy	Paramount
Through the Wrong Door	Clarence G. Badger	Madge Kennedy, John Bowers	Drama	Goldwyn
The Thunderbolt	Colin Campbell	Katherine MacDonald, Thomas Meighan	Drama	First National
Thunderbolts of Fate	Edward Warren	House Peters, Anna Lehr	Drama	Pathé Exchange
The Tiger Lily	George L. Cox	Margarita Fischer, Emory Johnson	Drama	Pathé Exchange
Tin Pan Alley	Frank Beal	Albert Ray, Elinor Fair	Comedy	Fox Film
Toby's Bow	Harry Beaumont	Tom Moore, Doris Pawn	Drama	Goldwyn
Todd of the Times	Eliot Howe	Frank Keenan, Aggie Herring	Comedy	Pathé Exchange
Told in the Hills	George Melford	Robert Warwick, Ann Little, Wanda Hawley	Western	Paramount
The Tong Man	William Worthington	Sessue Hayakawa, Helen Jerome Eddy	Crime	Robertson-Cole
Too Many Crooks	Ralph Ince	Gladys Leslie, Jean Paige	Comedy	Vitagraph
Too Much Johnson	Donald Crisp	Bryant Washburn, Lois Wilson	Comedy	Paramount
Toton the Apache	Frank Borzage	Olive Thomas, Norman Kerry	Drama	Triangle
The Trap	Frank Reicher	Olive Tell, Rod La Rocque	Drama	Universal
Treat 'Em Rough	Lynn Reynolds	Tom Mix, Jane Novak	Western	Fox Film
The Trembling Hour	George Siegmann	Helen Jerome Eddy, Kenneth Harlan	Mystery	Universal
A Trick of Fate	Howard Hickman	Bessie Barriscale, Gayne Whitman	Drama	Robertson-Cole
Trixie from Broadway	Roy William Neill	Margarita Fischer, Emory Johnson	Drama	Pathé Exchange
True Heart Susie	D. W. Griffith	Lillian Gish, Bobby Harron	Drama	Paramount
The Turn in the Road	King Vidor	George Nichols, Lloyd Hughes	Drama	Robertson-Cole
Turning the Tables	Elmer Clifton	Dorothy Gish, Raymond Cannon	Comedy	Paramount
The Twin Pawns	Léonce Perret	Mae Murray, Warner Oland	Drama	Pathé Exchange
The Two Brides	Edward Jose	Lina Cavalieri, Warburton Gamble	Drama	Paramount
Two Women	Ralph Ince	Anita Stewart, Earle Williams	Drama	Vitagraph

== U ==
Title	Director	Cast	Genre	Note
Under Suspicion	William C. Dowlan	Ora Carew, Charles Clary	Comedy	Universal
Under the Top	Donald Crisp	Fred Stone, Ella Hall, James Cruze	Comedy	Paramount
Unknown Love	Léonce Perret	Dolores Cassinelli, E.K. Lincoln	War drama	Pathé Exchange
The Unknown Quantity	Thomas R. Mills	Corinne Griffith, Huntley Gordon	Drama	Vitagraph
The Unpainted Woman	Tod Browning	Mary MacLaren, Thurston Hall	Drama	Universal
The Unpardonable Sin	Marshall Neilan	Blanche Sweet, Mary Alden, Wallace Beery	War drama	Independent
The Unwritten Code	Bernard J. Durning	Shirley Mason, Ormi Hawley, Matt Moore	Drama	World
The Uplifters	Herbert Blaché	May Allison, Howard Gaye	Comedy	Metro
Upstairs	Victor Schertzinger	Mabel Normand, Cullen Landis	Comedy	Goldwyn
Upstairs and Down	Charles Giblyn	Olive Thomas, David Butler	Comedy	Selznick
The Usurper	James Young	Earle Williams, Louise Lovely	Drama	Vitagraph

== V ==
Title	Director	Cast	Genre	Note
Vagabond Luck	Scott R. Dunlap	Albert Ray, Elinor Fair	Comedy	Fox Film
The Valley of the Giants	James Cruze	Wallace Reid, Grace Darmond	Drama	Paramount
Venus in the East	Donald Crisp	Bryant Washburn, Margery Wilson, Anna Q. Nilsson	Comedy	Paramount
A Very Good Young Man	Donald Crisp	Bryant Washburn, Helene Chadwick	Comedy	Paramount
Victory	Maurice Tourneur	Jack Holt, Seena Owen	Adventure	Paramount
The Virtuous Thief	Fred Niblo	Enid Bennett, Niles Welch	Drama	Paramount
The Veiled Adventure	Walter Edwards	Harrison Ford, Constance Talmadge	Comedy	Selznick
The Vengeance of Durand	Tom Terriss	Alice Joyce, Gustav von Seyffertitz, Percy Marmont	Drama	Vitagraph
The Virtuous Model	Albert Capellani	Dolores Cassinelli, Helen Lowell	Drama	Pathé Exchange
The Virtuous Thief	Fred Niblo	Enid Bennett, Niles Welch	Drama	Paramount
A Virtuous Vamp	Sidney Franklin	Constance Talmadge, Conway Tearle	Comedy	First National

== W ==
Title	Director	Cast	Genre	Note
Wagon Tracks	Lambert Hillyer	William S. Hart, Jane Novak	Western	Paramount
Wanted: A Husband	Lawrence C. Windom	Billie Burke, Charles Willis Lane	Comedy	Paramount
The Water Lily	George Ridgwell	Alice Mann, Donald Hall	Drama	Triangle
The Way of a Woman	Robert Z. Leonard	Norma Talmadge, Conway Tearle	Drama	Independent
The Way of the Strong	Edwin Carewe	Anna Q. Nilsson, Harry Northrup	Drama	Metro
The Weaker Vessel	Paul Powell	Mary MacLaren, Thurston Hall	Comedy drama	Universal
The Web of Chance	Alfred E. Green	Peggy Hyland, Harry Hamm	Comedy	Fox Film
The Westerners	Edward Sloman	Robert McKim, Wilfred Lucas	Western	Pathé Exchange
What Am I Bid?	Robert Z. Leonard	Mae Murray, Ralph Graves	Comedy	Universal
What Every Woman Learns	Fred Niblo	Enid Bennett, Milton Sills	Drama	Paramount
What Every Woman Wants	Jesse D. Hampton	Grace Darmond, Wilfred Lucas	Drama	Robertson-Cole
When a Girl Loves	Lois Weber	Mildred Harris, William Stowell	Western	Universal
When a Man Loves	Chester Bennett	Earle Williams, Margaret Loomis	Drama	Vitagraph
When a Man Rides Alone	Henry King	William Russell, Carl Stockdale	Western	Pathé Exchange
When Doctors Disagree	Victor Schertzinger	Mabel Normand, Walter Hiers	Comedy	Goldwyn
When Fate Decides	Harry Millarde	Madlaine Traverse, William Conklin	Drama	Fox Film
When Men Desire	J. Gordon Edwards	Theda Bara, G. Raymond Nye	Drama	Fox Film
When the Clouds Roll By	Victor Fleming, Theodore Reed	Douglas Fairbanks, Kathleen Clifford	Comedy	United Artists
Where the West Begins	Henry King	William Russell, Eileen Percy, Cullen Landis	Western	Pathé Exchange
The White Heather	Maurice Tourneur	Holmes Herbert, Ben Alexander	Drama	Paramount
A White Man's Chance	Ernest C. Warde	J. Warren Kerrigan, Lillian Walker	Adventure	Pathé Exchange
Whitewashed Walls	Park Frame	William Desmond, Fritzi Brunette	Comedy	Robertson-Cole
Who Cares?	Walter Edwards	Constance Talmadge, Harrison Ford	Comedy	Selznick
Who Will Marry Me?	Paul Powell	Carmel Myers, Thurston Hall	Drama	Universal
Whom the Gods Would Destroy	Frank Borzage	Jack Mulhall, Pauline Starke	Drama	First National
Why Smith Left Home	Donald Crisp	Bryant Washburn, Lois Wilson	Comedy	Paramount
The Wicked Darling	Tod Browning	Priscilla Dean, Lon Chaney	Drama	Universal
Widow by Proxy	Walter Edwards	Marguerite Clark, Agnes Vernon, Nigel Barrie	Comedy	Paramount
The Wilderness Trail	Edward J. Le Saint	Tom Mix, Colleen Moore	Western	Fox Film
The Winchester Woman	Wesley Ruggles	Alice Joyce, Percy Marmont	Crime	Vitagraph
Wings of the Morning	J. Gordon Edwards	William Farnum, Herschel Mayall	Drama	Fox Film
The Winning Girl	Robert G. Vignola	Shirley Mason, Theodore Roberts	Comedy	Paramount
The Winning Stroke	Edward Dillon	George Walsh, Jane McAlpine	Sports	Fox Film
The Wishing Ring Man	David Smith	Bessie Love, Claire Du Brey	Drama	Vitagraph
The Witness for the Defense	George Fitzmaurice	Elsie Ferguson, Warner Oland	Drama	Paramount
The Wolf	James Young	Earle Williams, Jane Novak	Drama	Vitagraph
Wolves of the Night	J. Gordon Edwards	William Farnum, Louise Lovely, Lamar Johnstone	Drama	Fox Film
The Woman Michael Married	Henry Kolker	Bessie Barriscale, Jack Holt	Drama	Robertson-Cole
The Woman Next Door	Robert G. Vignola	Ethel Clayton, Emory Johnson, Noah Beery	Drama	Paramount
A Woman of Pleasure	Wallace Worsley	Blanche Sweet, Wheeler Oakman	Drama	Pathé Exchange
The Woman on the Index	Hobart Henley	Pauline Frederick, Wyndham Standing	Drama	Goldwyn
A Woman There Was	J. Gordon Edwards	Theda Bara, William B. Davidson	Romance	Fox Film
The Woman Thou Gavest Me	Hugh Ford	Jack Holt, Katherine MacDonald, Milton Sills	Drama	Paramount
The Woman Under Cover	George Siegmann	Fritzi Brunette, Fontaine La Rue	Drama	Universal
Woman, Woman!	Kenean Buel	Evelyn Nesbit, Gareth Hughes	Drama	Fox Film
Words and Music by-	Scott R. Dunlap	Albert Ray, Elinor Fair	Comedy drama	Fox Film
The World Aflame	Ernest C. Warde	Frank Keenan, Kathleen Kerrigan	Drama	Pathé Exchange
The World and Its Woman	Frank Lloyd	Geraldine Farrar, Lou Tellegen	Drama	Goldwyn
The World to Live In	Charles Maigne	Alice Brady, Virginia Hammond	Comedy	Independent

== Y–Z ==
Title	Director	Cast	Genre	Note
Yankee Doodle in Berlin	F. Richard Jones	Bothwell Browne, Ford Sterling	Comedy	Independent
A Yankee Princess	David Smith	Bessie Love, Robert Gordon	Comedy	Vitagraph
You Never Saw Such a Girl	Robert G. Vignola	Vivian Martin, Harrison Ford	Drama	Paramount
You're Fired	James Cruze	Wallace Reid, Wanda Hawley	Comedy	Paramount
Yvonne from Paris	Emmett J. Flynn	Mary Miles Minter, Vera Lewis	Comedy	Pathé Exchange

== Short films ==
Title	Director	Cast	Genre	Notes
Ask Father	Hal Roach	Harold Lloyd, Bebe Daniels	Comedy	
At the Old Stage Door	Hal Roach	Harold Lloyd, Bebe Daniels	Comedy	
Back Stage	Fatty Arbuckle	Fatty Arbuckle, Buster Keaton	Comedy	Paramount
Be My Wife	Hal Roach	Harold Lloyd, Bebe Daniels	Comedy	
Before Breakfast	Hal Roach	Harold Lloyd, Bebe Daniels	Comedy	
Billy Blazes, Esq.	Hal Roach	Harold Lloyd, Bebe Daniels	Comedy	
Bumping Into Broadway	Hal Roach	Harold Lloyd, Bebe Daniels	Comedy	
By Indian Post	John Ford	Pete Morrison, Duke R. Lee	Western	
Captain Kidd's Kids	Hal Roach	Harold Lloyd, Bebe Daniels	Comedy	
Chop Suey & Co.	Hal Roach	Harold Lloyd, Snub Pollard, Bebe Daniels	Comedy	
Count the Votes	Hal Roach	Harold Lloyd, Snub Pollard, Bebe Daniels	Comedy	
Count Your Change	Alfred J. Goulding	Harold Lloyd, Snub Pollard, Bebe Daniels	Comedy	
Crack Your Heels	Alfred J. Goulding	Harold Lloyd, Snub Pollard, Bebe Daniels	Comedy	
The Crow	B. Reeves Eason	Hoot Gibson, Arthur Mackley	Western	
A Day's Pleasure	Charlie Chaplin	Charlie Chaplin, Edna Purviance		
Don't Shove	Alfred J. Goulding	Harold Lloyd, Bebe Daniels, Bud Jamison	Comedy	
The Dutiful Dub	Alfred J. Goulding	Harold Lloyd, Snub Pollard, Bebe Daniels	Comedy	
The Fighting Heart	B. Reeves Eason	Jack Perrin, Hoot Gibson, Josephine Hill	Western	
The Fighting Line	B. Reeves Eason	Art Acord, Mildred Moore	Western	
The Four-Bit Man	B. Reeves Eason	Hoot Gibson, Jack Perrin, Josephine Hill	Western	
From Hand to Mouth	Alfred J. Goulding, Hal Roach	Harold Lloyd, Mildred Davis	Comedy	
Going! Going! Gone!	Gilbert Pratt	Harold Lloyd, Snub Pollard, Bebe Daniels	Comedy	
The Grocery Clerk	Larry Semon	Larry Semon, Lucille Carlisle, Monty Banks	Comedy	
He Leads, Others Follow	Hal Roach	Harold Lloyd, Bebe Daniels	Comedy	
Heap Big Chief	Alfred J. Goulding	Harold Lloyd, Snub Pollard	Comedy	
His Only Father	Hal Roach	Harold Lloyd, Snub Pollard	Comedy	
How the Telephone Talks			Educational	Bray Studios production.
I'm on My Way		Harold Lloyd	Comedy	
The Jack of Hearts	B. Reeves Eason	Hoot Gibson, Jack Perrin	Western	
A Jazzed Honeymoon	Hal Roach	Harold Lloyd, Bebe Daniels	Comedy	
Just Dropped In	Hal Roach	Harold Lloyd, Bebe Daniels	Comedy	
Just Neighbors	Harold Lloyd	Harold Lloyd, Snub Pollard	Comedy	
The Kid and the Cowboy	B. Reeves Eason	Art Acord	Western	
The Last Outlaw	John Ford	Richard Cummings, Lucille Hutton	Western	
Look Out Below	Hal Roach	Harold Lloyd	Comedy	
The Marathon	Alfred J. Goulding	Harold Lloyd	Comedy	
Never Touched Me	Alfred J. Goulding	Harold Lloyd, Snub Pollard	Comedy	
Next Aisle Over	Hal Roach	Harold Lloyd, Bebe Daniels	Comedy	
Nine-Tenths of the Law	B. Reeves Eason	Mitchell Lewis, Jimsy Maye	Drama	
Off the Trolley	Alfred J. Goulding	Harold Lloyd	Comedy	
On the Fire	Hal Roach	Harold Lloyd	Comedy	
Pay Your Dues	Hal Roach	Harold Lloyd	Comedy	
Pistols for Breakfast	Alfred J. Goulding	Harold Lloyd, Bebe Daniels	Comedy	
The Rajah	Hal Roach	Harold Lloyd, Bebe Daniels	Comedy	
Ring Up the Curtain	Alfred J. Goulding	Harold Lloyd	Comedy	
Si, Senor	Alfred J. Goulding	Harold Lloyd	Comedy	
Soft Money	Hal Roach	Harold Lloyd	Comedy	
Spring Fever	Hal Roach	Harold Lloyd, Bebe Daniels	Comedy	
Sunnyside	Charles Chaplin	Charlie Chaplin, Edna Purviance	Comedy	
Swat the Crook	Hal Roach	Harold Lloyd, Snub Pollard	Comedy	
The Speakeasy	F. Richard Jones	Charles Murray, Marie Prevost	Comedy	
The Tell Tale Wire	B. Reeves Eason	Hoot Gibson, Josephine Hill	Western	
Wanted - $5,000	Gilbert Pratt	Harold Lloyd, Bebe Daniels	Comedy	
Young Mr. Jazz	Hal Roach	Harold Lloyd	Comedy	

== See also ==
- 1919 in the United States
