= From Laramie to London =

1917 silent short film

- Written by: H. M. Walker
- Produced by: Hal Roach
- Starring: Harold Lloyd
- Release date: October 21, 1917
- Country: United States
- Languages: Silent; English intertitles

From Laramie to London is a 1917 short comedy film featuring Harold Lloyd.

== Cast ==
- Harold Lloyd as Lonesome Luke
- Snub Pollard
- Bebe Daniels
- W.L. Adams
- Billy Fay
- Bud Jamison
- Fred Jefferson
- Margaret Joslin
- Marie Mosquini
- Fred C. Newmeyer
- Gilbert Pratt
- Charles Stevenson
- Dorothea Wolbert

== See also ==
- Harold Lloyd filmography
