= Stop! Luke! Listen! =

1917 film

- Directed by: Hal Roach
- Produced by: Hal Roach
- Starring: Harold Lloyd
- Distributed by: Pathé Exchange
- Release date: July 15, 1917
- Country: United States
- Languages: Silent; English intertitles

Stop! Luke! Listen! is a 1917 short comedy film featuring Harold Lloyd.

== Cast ==
- Harold Lloyd as Lonesome Luke
- Bebe Daniels
- Snub Pollard
- Bud Jamison
- Sammy Brooks
- W.L. Adams
- David Voorhees
- Charles Stevenson (as Charles E. Stevenson)
- Arthur Harrison
- Gilbert Pratt
- Max Hamburger
- Gus Leonard
- Clara Dray
- Elmer Ballard
- May Ballard
- Loretta Morelaw
- Billy Fay
- Sandy Roth
- Margaret Joslin (as Margaret Joslin Todd)
- Marie Mosquini
- Art Bass

== See also ==
- Harold Lloyd filmography
