= Crack Your Heels =

1919 film

- Directed by: Alfred J. Goulding
- Produced by: Hal Roach
- Starring: Harold Lloyd
- Distributed by: Pathé Exchange
- Release date: April 20, 1919
- Running time: 10 minutes
- Country: United States
- Languages: Silent; English intertitles

Crack Your Heels is a 1919 American silent comedy short film featuring Harold Lloyd, and directed by Alfred J. Goulding. A print of Crack Your Heels exists.

== Cast ==
- Harold Lloyd as The Boy
- Snub Pollard
- Bebe Daniels
- Sammy Brooks
- Billy Fay
- Lew Harvey
- Wallace Howe
- Margaret Joslin (as Margaret Joslyn)
- Marie Mosquini
- Fred C. Newmeyer
- James Parrott
- William Petterson
- Noah Young

== Reception ==
In its April 19, 1919 issue, The Moving Picture World wrote that it "does not boast of any connected plot, which would have improved it considerably."

== See also ==
- List of American films of 1919
- Harold Lloyd filmography
