= Margaret Joslin =

American actress (1883–1956)

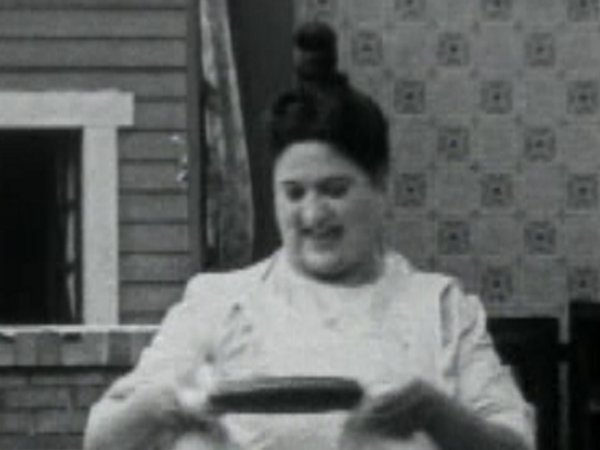
- Born: August 6, 1883; Cleveland, Ohio, US
- Died: October 14, 1956 (aged 73); Glendale, California, US
- Other names: Margaret Joslyn; Margaret Joslin Todd
- Occupation: Actress
- Years active: 1910–1923
- Spouse: Harry Todd

Margaret Joslin (August 6, 1883 – October 14, 1956), born Margaret Lucy Gosling, was an American film actress. She appeared in more than 160 films between 1910 and 1923. She was born Cleveland, Ohio and died in Glendale, California. She was married to comedian Harry Todd.

== Selected filmography ==
- Three Jumps Ahead (1923)
- The Danger Point (1922)
- A Jazzed Honeymoon (1919)
- Just Neighbors (1919)
- Crack Your Heels (1919)
- Young Mr. Jazz (1919)
- Just Dropped In (1919)
- Next Aisle Over (1919)
- The Dutiful Dub (1919)
- Look Out Below (1919)
- On the Fire (1919)
- Ask Father (1919)
- Hustling for Health (1919)
- Wanted - $5,000 (1919)
- She Loves Me Not (1918)
- The Non-Stop Kid (1918)
- We Never Sleep (1917)
- Love, Laughs and Lather (1917)
- From Laramie to London (1917)
- Pinched (1917)
- Lonesome Luke Loses Patients (1917)
- Over the Fence (1917)
- Lonesome Luke's Wild Women (1917)
- Stop! Luke! Listen! (1917)
- Lonesome Luke on Tin Can Alley (1917)
- Luke's Shattered Sleep (1916)
- Luke, Rank Impersonator (1916)
- Luke's Movie Muddle (1916)
- Luke's Newsie Knockout (1916)
- Luke, Patient Provider (1916)
- Luke, the Gladiator (1916)
- Luke's Preparedness Preparations (1916)
- Luke, the Chauffeur (1916)
- Luke and the Bang-Tails (1916)
- Luke's Speedy Club Life (1916)
- Luke and the Mermaids (1916)
- Luke Joins the Navy (1916)
- Luke Does the Midway (1916)
- Luke's Lost Lamb (1916)
- It Can't Be True! (1916)
- Alkali Ike's Motorcycle (1912)
- Alkali Ike's Auto (1911)
