= The Dutiful Dub =

1919 film

- Directed by: Alfred J. Goulding
- Produced by: Hal Roach
- Starring: Harold Lloyd
- Distributed by: Pathé Exchange
- Release date: March 23, 1919
- Running time: 10 minutes
- Country: United States
- Languages: Silent; English intertitles

The Dutiful Dub is a 1919 American silent comedy short film featuring Harold Lloyd. In the film, Lloyd plays a submissive husband who suddenly asserts himself. A print of The Dutiful Dub exists.

== Cast ==
- Harold Lloyd as The Boy
- Snub Pollard
- Bebe Daniels
- Harry Burns
- Billy Fay
- William Gillespie
- Lew Harvey
- Bud Jamison
- Margaret Joslin
- James Parrott
- Dorothea Wolbert

== Reception ==
The film was released on March 23, 1919. In its March 25 issue that year, Motion Picture World said, "The action is broadly humorous."

== See also ==
- List of American films of 1919
- Harold Lloyd filmography
