= Before Breakfast =

1919 American silent film

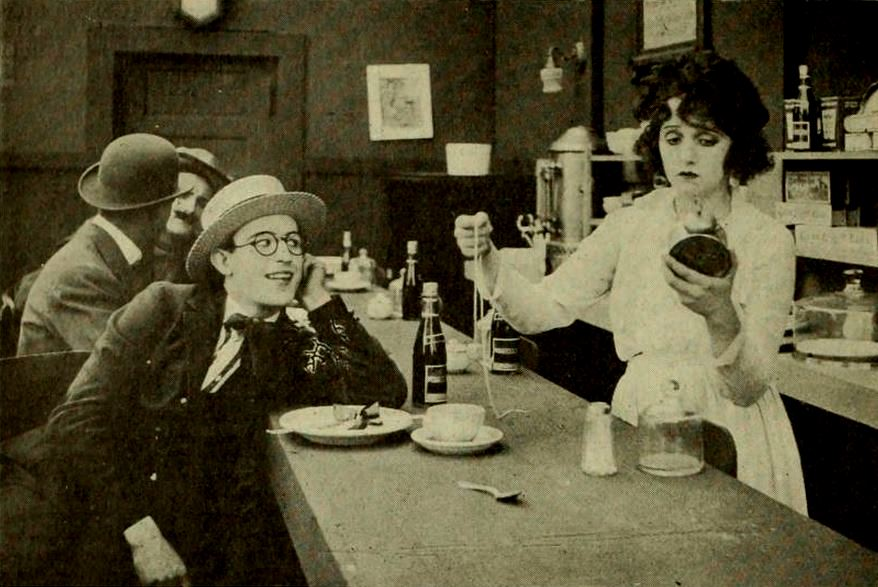
- Still with Lloyd and Daniels
- Directed by: Hal Roach
- Produced by: Hal Roach
- Starring: Harold Lloyd
- Production company: Rolin Films
- Distributed by: Pathé Exchange
- Release date: May 18, 1919
- Running time: 10 minutes
- Country: United States
- Language: Silent (English intertitles)

Before Breakfast is a 1919 American silent comedy short film starring Harold Lloyd. A print of Before Breakfast exists.

== Cast ==
- Harold Lloyd as The Boy
- Snub Pollard
- Bebe Daniels
- Sammy Brooks
- Lew Harvey
- Noah Young

== See also ==
- List of American films of 1919
- Harold Lloyd filmography
