= Lonesome Luke Loses Patients =

1917 film

- Produced by: Hal Roach
- Starring: Harold Lloyd
- Release date: September 16, 1917
- Country: United States
- Languages: Silent film English intertitles

Lonesome Luke Loses Patients is a 1917 American short comedy film featuring Harold Lloyd.

== Cast ==
- Harold Lloyd as Lonesome Luke
- Bebe Daniels
- Snub Pollard
- Bud Jamison
- Gus Leonard
- Charles Stevenson - (as Charles E. Stevenson)
- Fred C. Newmeyer
- Billy Fay
- Sammy Brooks
- Gilbert Pratt
- Margaret Joslin - (as Margaret Joslin Todd)
- Harry Todd
- Marie Mosquini

== See also ==
- Harold Lloyd filmography
