= Pinched =

1917 film

- Directed by: Harold Lloyd; Gilbert Pratt
- Produced by: Hal Roach
- Starring: Harold Lloyd
- Cinematography: Walter Lundin
- Edited by: Della Mullady
- Release date: September 23, 1917
- Running time: 10 minutes
- Country: United States
- Language: Silent (English intertitles)

Pinched is a 1917 American short comedy film starring Harold Lloyd. A print of the film is held by the Museum of Modern Art, and it has been released on DVD. Like many American films of the time, Pinched was subject to cuts by city and state film censorship boards. The Chicago Board of Censors required a cut of scene with a man thumbing his nose.

== Plot ==
The Boy is taking his sweetheart for a leisurely drive in an open automobile when his cap blows off his head and is carried by the wind into a nearby park. When he goes to retrieve it, The Boy encounters an armed robber who steals his money. The robber convinces a park policeman that The Boy was attempting to rob him. This leads to a series of comic misunderstandings as The Boy tries to get his money back and prove his innocence.

== Cast ==
- Harold Lloyd as The Boy
- Snub Pollard
- Bebe Daniels
- William Blaisdell
- Sammy Brooks
- Bud Jamison
- Margaret Joslin (credited as Margaret Joslin Todd)
- Gus Leonard
- Fred C. Newmeyer
- Charles Stevenson
- Dorothea Wolbert

== See also ==
- Harold Lloyd filmography
