= Look Out Below =

1919 film

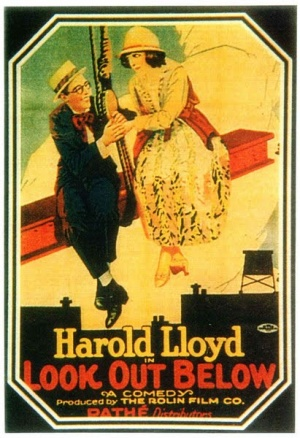
- Directed by: Hal Roach
- Produced by: Hal Roach
- Starring: Harold Lloyd
- Distributed by: Pathé Exchange
- Release date: March 16, 1919
- Running time: 10 minutes
- Country: United States
- Languages: Silent; English intertitles

Look Out Below is a 1919 American silent comedy short film starring Harold Lloyd. Prints of this film survive.

== Cast ==
- Harold Lloyd - The Boy
- Bebe Daniels - The Girl
- Snub Pollard - Snub
- Sammy Brooks
- Billy Fay
- Lew Harvey
- Bud Jamison
- Margaret Joslin
- Oscar Larson
- Marie Mosquini
- William Petterson
- Noah Young

== See also ==
- Harold Lloyd filmography
