= Count the Votes =

1919 film

- Directed by: Hal Roach
- Written by: H.M. Walker
- Produced by: Hal Roach
- Starring: Harold Lloyd
- Cinematography: Walter Lundin
- Release date: October 5, 1919
- Country: United States
- Languages: Silent; English intertitles

Count the Votes is a 1919 American short comedy film featuring Harold Lloyd. It is considered to be lost.

== Cast ==
- Harold Lloyd
- Snub Pollard
- Bebe Daniels
- Sammy Brooks
- Lige Conley (credited as Lige Cromley)
- Frank Daniels
- Mark Jones
- Gus Leonard
- Marie Mosquini
- Fred C. Newmeyer
- H.L. O'Connor
- Charles Stevenson (credited as Charles E. Stevenson)
- Noah Young

== See also ==
- List of American films of 1919
- Harold Lloyd filmography
- List of lost films
