= The Life Line =

1919 film by Maurice Tourneur

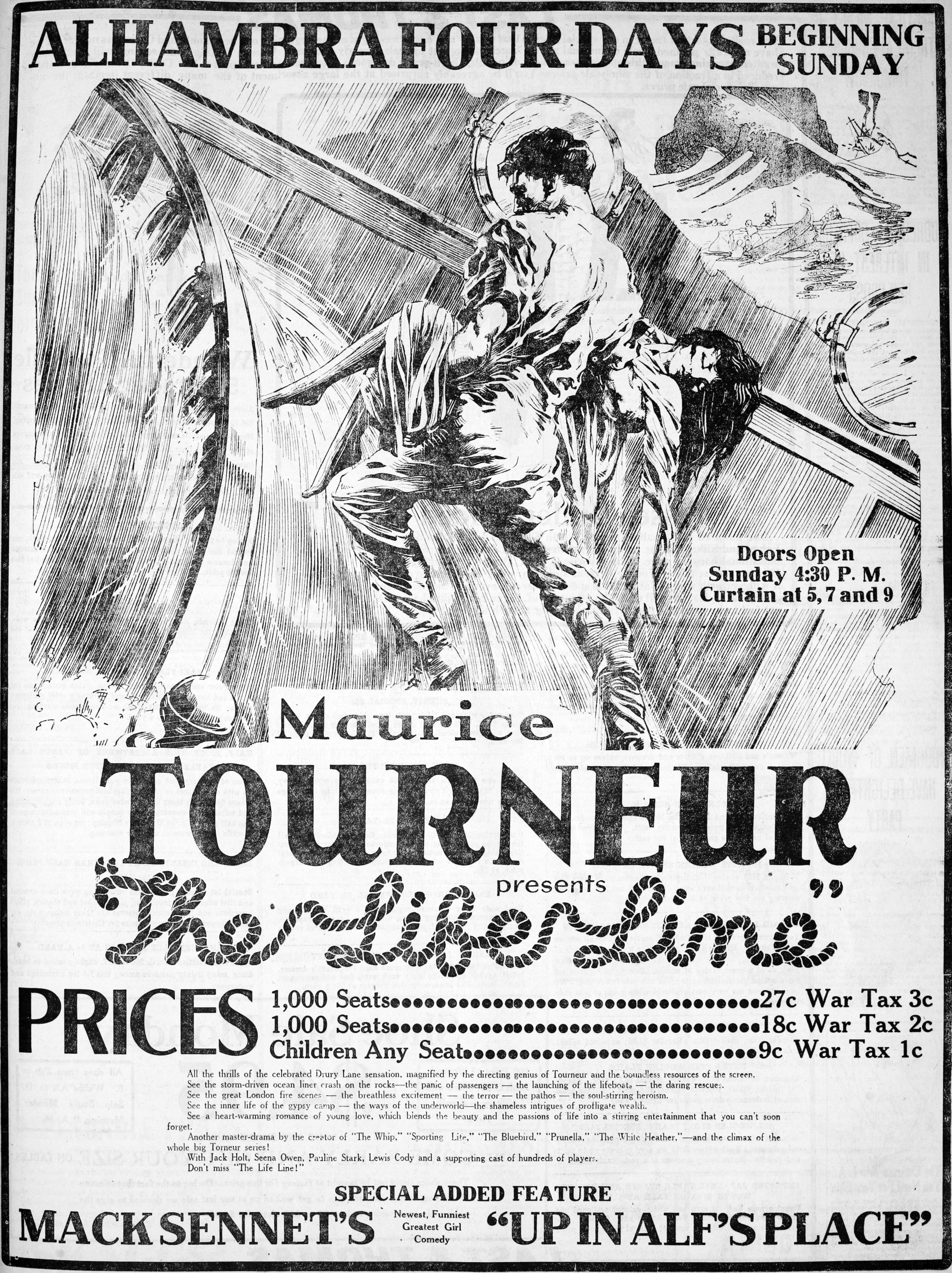
- Newspaper advertisement.
- Directed by: Maurice Tourneur
- Written by: George R. Sims (play); Charles E. Whittaker
- Produced by: Maurice Tourneur
- Starring: Jack Holt; Wallace Beery; Lew Cody; Tully Marshall
- Production company: Maurice Tourneur Productions
- Distributed by: Famous Players–Lasky Corporation
- Release date: September 28, 1919
- Running time: 60 minutes
- Country: United States
- Language: Silent (English intertitles)

The Life Line is a 1919 American silent drama film directed by Maurice Tourneur and starring Jack Holt, Wallace Beery and Lew Cody. The picture was based on the play The Romany Rye by the British playwright George R. Sims. The film is set amongst criminal classes in the slums of London.

== Cast ==
- Jack Holt as Jack Hearne, the Romany Rye
- Wallace Beery as Bos
- Lew Cody as Phillip Royston
- Tully Marshall as Joe Heckett
- Seena Owen as Laura
- Pauline Starke as Ruth Heckett

== Preservation status ==
A print is preserved at Filmmuseum Amsterdam, aka the EYE Institut.

== Bibliography ==
- Waldman, Harry. Maurice Tourneur: The Life and Films. McFarland, 2008.
