= Ask Father =

1919 film by Hal Roach

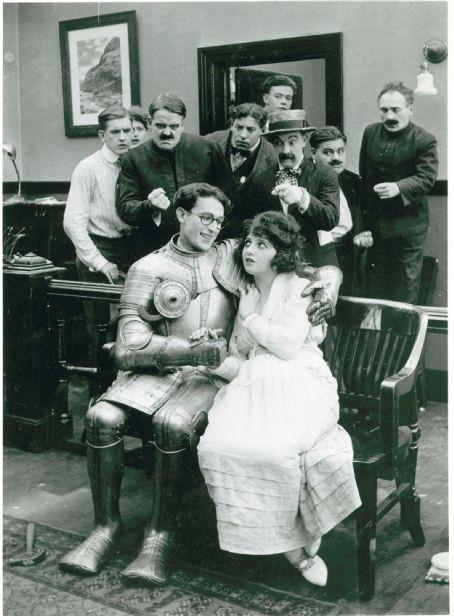
- Directed by: Hal Roach
- Written by: H. M. Walker
- Produced by: Hal Roach
- Starring: Harold Lloyd
- Release date: February 9, 1919
- Running time: 13 minutes
- Country: United States
- Languages: Silent; English intertitles

Ask Father is a short, 13-minute, slapstick-style comedy made by Harold Lloyd in 1919 before his entry into full-length feature films. Aside from Lloyd, it features Snub Pollard and leading lady Bebe Daniels.

== Plot ==
Lloyd is a serious young middle-class guy on the make, who wants to marry the boss’ daughter. The problem is getting in to see the boss so that he can ask for her hand in marriage; the office is guarded by a bunch of comic, clumsy flunkies who throw everyone out who tries to get in. When Lloyd gets into the boss’ office, the latter uses trap doors and conveyor belts to expel him; Lloyd then goes to the costume company next door, tries to get in wearing drag (no success), and then in medieval armor – that works, since he bangs everyone over the head with his club. When he learns that the daughter has eloped with another suitor, Lloyd decides to be sensible and he settles for the cute switchboard operator (Daniels) instead. The film includes a brief wall climbing sequence.

== Cast ==
- Harold Lloyd - The Boy
- Bebe Daniels - Switchboard operator
- Snub Pollard - The Corn-Fed Secretary
- Wallace Howe - The Boss
- Bud Jamison - Guardian at the door
- Noah Young - Large office worker
- Sammy Brooks - Short office worker
- Marie Mosquini - The Boy's First Love
- James Parrott - Willie, The Boy's Rival
- Harry Burns
- William Gillespie - Office worker
- Lew Harvey
- Margaret Joslin
- Dorothea Wolbert
- Charles Stevenson - The Cop

== Music ==
In 2013, the Dallas Chamber Symphony commissioned an original film score for Ask Father from composer Alain Mayrand. The score premiered during a concert screening on November 19, 2013, at Moody Performance Hall with Richard McKay conducting.

== See also ==
- List of American films of 1919
- Harold Lloyd filmography
