= How the Telephone Talks =

1919 film

- Production company: Bray Studios
- Release date: April 27, 1919
- Country: United States
- Language: Silent

How the Telephone Talks is a 1919 American silent educational documentary film made by Bray Studios. It demonstrates how the telephone works with a series of demonstrations and animated diagrams. The film was released on April 27, 1919.
