= Just Dropped In =

1919 silent film

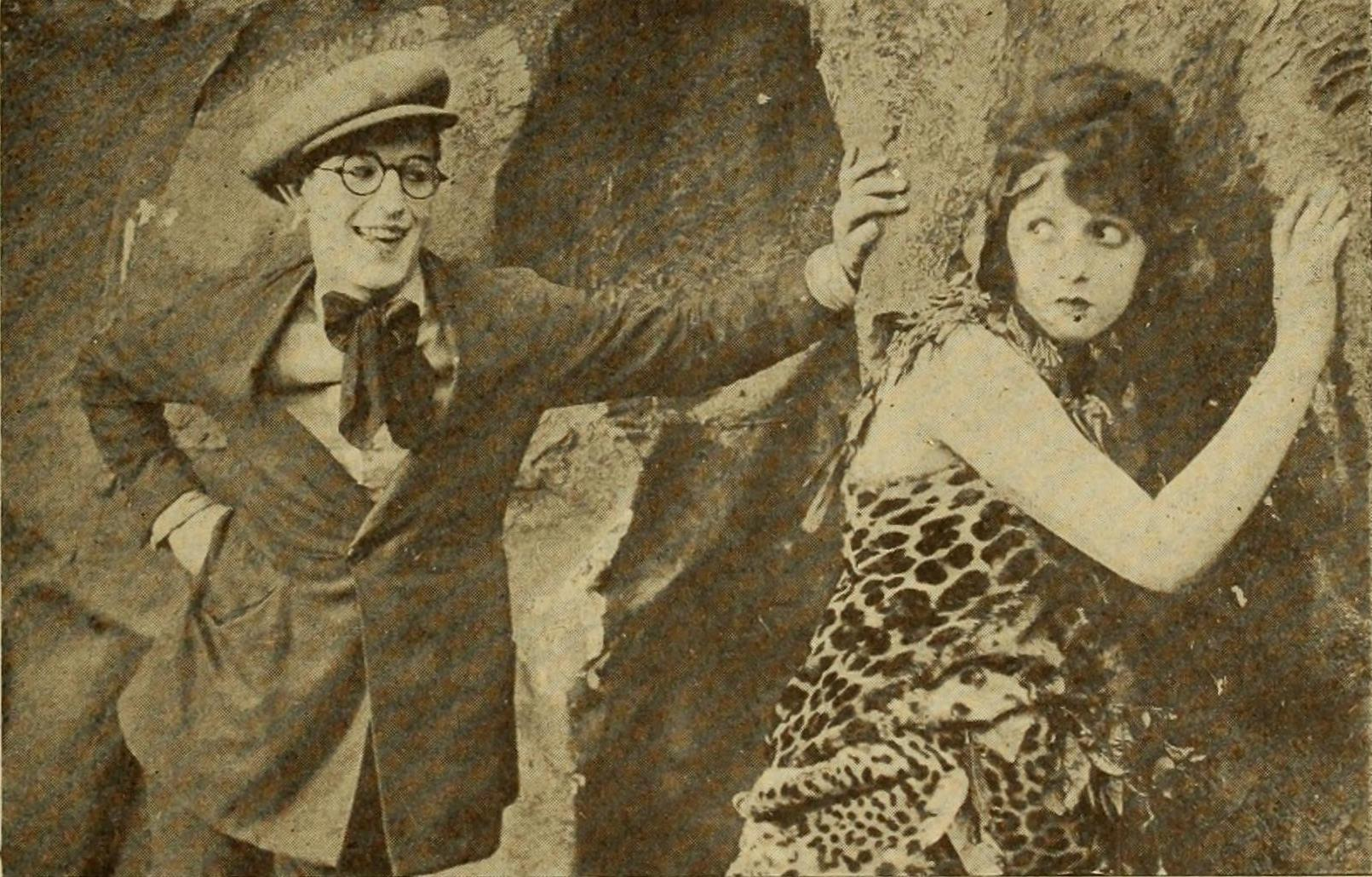
- Film still
- Directed by: Hal Roach
- Produced by: Hal Roach
- Starring: Harold Lloyd
- Distributed by: Pathé Exchange
- Release date: April 13, 1919
- Running time: 10 minutes
- Country: United States
- Languages: Silent; English intertitles

Just Dropped In is a 1919 American silent comedy short film featuring Harold Lloyd.

== Cast ==
- Harold Lloyd as The Boy
- Snub Pollard
- Bebe Daniels
- Mildred Forbes
- Estelle Harrison
- Wallace Howe
- Margaret Joslin
- Belle Mitchell
- William Petterson
- Noah Young

== See also ==
- List of American films of 1919
- Harold Lloyd filmography
