= Billy Blazes, Esq. =

1919 film

- Directed by: Hal Roach
- Written by: H. M. Walker
- Produced by: Hal Roach
- Starring: Harold Lloyd
- Cinematography: Walter Lundin
- Distributed by: Pathé Exchange
- Release date: July 6, 1919
- Running time: 13 minutes
- Country: United States
- Languages: Silent; English intertitles

Billy Blazes, Esq. is a 1919 American short comedy film featuring Harold Lloyd. The film was a parody of Westerns of the time. A print of the film survives in the film archive of the British Film Institute.

== Plot summary ==
In the lawless town of Peaceful Vale, a villainous gambler named "Crooked" Charley maintains a reign of terror over the local inhabitants, specifically targeting an elderly saloon owner and his daughter, Nell. The town's sheriff, "Gun Shy" Gallagher, is too cowardly to intervene, allowing Charley to seize control of the saloon and hold Nell captive. The conflict reaches a turning point when the legendary gunslinger Billy Blazes (Harold Lloyd) rides into town. Billy engages in a series of acrobatic gunfights and comedic stunts to dismantle Charley's gang, eventually cornering the villain and rescuing Nell and her father. The film concludes with a satirical "three years later" epilogue, depicting Billy and Nell as a married couple surrounded by several children who are humorously too old to be theirs.

== Cast ==
- Harold Lloyd as Billy Blazes
- Bebe Daniels as Nell
- Snub Pollard as Sheriff 'Gun Shy' Gallagher (as Harry Pollard)
- Sammy Brooks
- Billy Fay
- Noah Young (uncredited)

== Plot ==
In the misnamed western hamlet of Peaceful Vale, where gun play is commonplace, there has not been a murder in 20 minutes. The father and daughter co-proprietors of a local saloon are harassed by the leader of a violent mob who attempts to run the father out of the country while holding his pretty daughter, Nell, hostage. Heroic Billy Blazes arrives in time to free the father, rescue Nell, and escape with her to safety. The film's final scene, set "three years later", shows Nell and Billy as the parents of a large and happy family, whose children are clearly more than three years old.

Although the film is only 13 minutes long, the title character does not appear until five minutes into film.

== See also ==
- List of American films of 1919
- Harold Lloyd filmography
