= Just Neighbors =

1919 film

- Directed by: Harold Lloyd; Frank Terry
- Produced by: Hal Roach
- Starring: Harold Lloyd
- Cinematography: Fred Guiol
- Release date: July 13, 1919
- Running time: 13 minutes
- Country: United States
- Language: Silent (English intertitles)

Just Neighbors is a 1919 American silent short comedy film featuring Harold Lloyd. Prints of the film survive in the film archives at George Eastman House, the UCLA Film and Television Archive, Filmoteca Española, and Library and Archives Canada.

== Plot ==
Harold and Snub are friendly neighbors who have adjoining backyards. Harold's good-natured attempt to help Snub build a chicken coop in his backyard leads to a series of destructive mishaps. They culminate in the two men fighting even though they are separated by a fence. Their friendship is restored when Snub's toddler daughter, who has wandered into a busy street, is rescued.

== Cast ==
- Harold Lloyd as The Boy
- Bebe Daniels as The Bride
- Snub Pollard as The Neighbor
- Sammy Brooks as Short man in bank (uncredited)
- Helen Gilmore as Old woman with packages (uncredited)
- Margaret Joslin as Neighbor's Wife (uncredited)
- Gus Leonard as Bearded bank teller / Vegetable vendor (uncredited)
- Gaylord Lloyd as Man in Line at Bank (uncredited)
- Marie Mosquini (uncredited)
- Charles Stevenson as Postman (uncredited)
- Noah Young (uncredited)

== See also ==
- Harold Lloyd filmography
