= Next Aisle Over =

1919 film

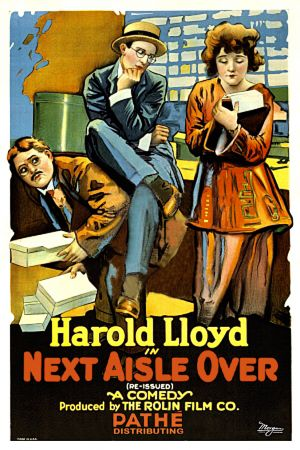
- Theatrical poster to Next Aisle Over
- Directed by: Hal Roach
- Written by: H. M. Walker
- Produced by: Hal Roach
- Starring: Harold Lloyd
- Release date: March 30, 1919
- Running time: 9 minutes
- Country: United States
- Languages: Silent; English intertitles

Next Aisle Over is a 1919 American short comedy film starring Harold Lloyd.

== Plot ==
Next Aisle Over (1919)

Bebe is employed as a counter girl in a department store. Harold is her boyfriend. When he arrives at the store to peddle samples of his company's goods, he runs afoul of the manager. Bebe gets him out of trouble temporarily by saying he's the new shoe salesman. Harold creates chaos trying to sell shoes to a variety of customers. Harold eventually thwarts three crooks who intend to poison the staff and abduct Bebe.

== Cast ==
- Harold Lloyd
- Snub Pollard
- Bebe Daniels
- Marie Mosquini
- Sammy Brooks
- Billy Fay
- William Gillespie
- Lew Harvey
- Wallace Howe
- Margaret Joslin
- William Petterson
- Dorothea Wolbert

== See also ==
- Harold Lloyd filmography
