= Heap Big Chief =

1919 film

- Directed by: Alfred J. Goulding
- Written by: H.M. Walker
- Produced by: Hal Roach
- Starring: Harold Lloyd
- Cinematography: Walter Lundin
- Release date: August 24, 1919
- Country: United States
- Languages: Silent; English intertitles

Heap Big Chief is a 1919 American short comedy film featuring Harold Lloyd. Previously thought to be a lost film, a print was located at the Cinema Museum in London in 2018. The recovered film was later shown to audiences on the second day of the Silent Laughter Weekend on April 28, 2019.

== Cast ==
- Harold Lloyd
- Snub Pollard
- Bebe Daniels
- Sammy Brooks
- Lige Conley
- Lew Harvey
- Wallace Howe
- Bud Jamison
- Dee Lampton
- Earl Mohan
- Marie Mosquini
- Fred C. Newmeyer
- James Parrott
- Noah Young

== See also ==
- Harold Lloyd filmography
