= Getting Mary Married =

1919 film by Allan Dwan

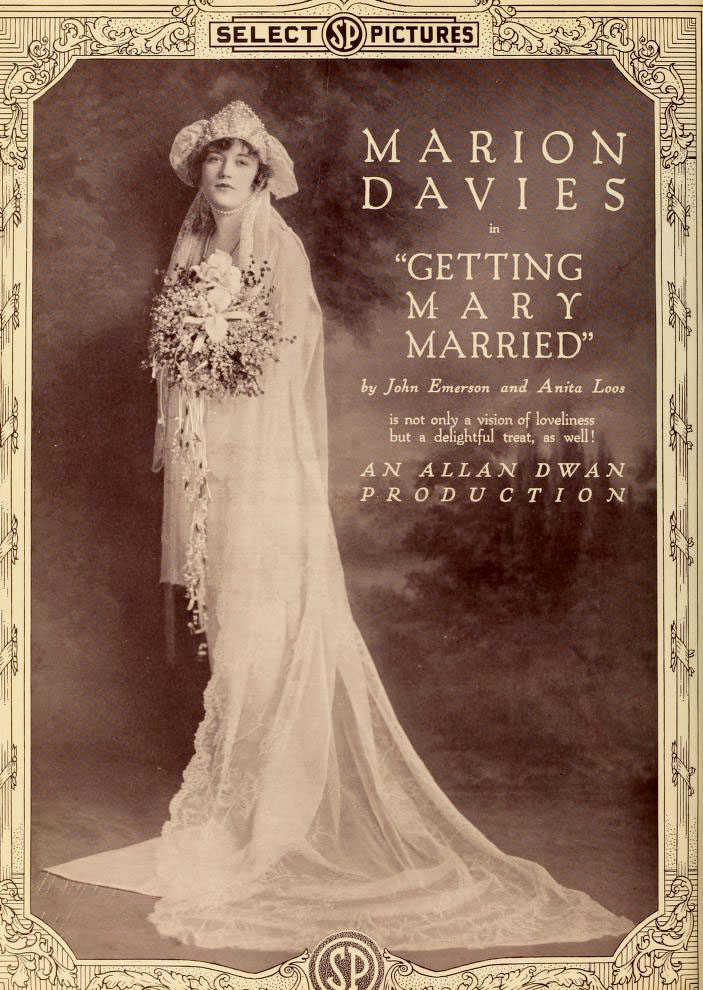
- Directed by: Allan Dwan
- Written by: John Emerson, Anita Loos
- Produced by: Marion Davies
- Starring: Marion Davies; Norman Kerry; Matt Moore
- Cinematography: H. Lyman Broening
- Production company: Cosmopolitan Productions
- Distributed by: Select Pictures Corporation
- Release date: April 19, 1919
- Running time: 5 reels
- Country: United States
- Language: Silent (English intertitles)

Getting Mary Married is a 1919 silent American comedy film directed by Allan Dwan and starring Marion Davies. It was distributed by the Select Pictures Corporation.

== Plot ==
A young woman is left a fortune but only if she can fulfill her step-father's will by remaining unmarried and living with his brother Amos' family for a year. Of course if Mary refuses or is unable to do so the fortune instead goes to Amos and he has been waiting years for a chance at his brother's money. Amos has his plans to get the money and when handsome bachelor James Winthrop shows, up Mary things become even more complicated.

== Cast ==
- Marion Davies as Mary Bussard
- Norman Kerry as James Winthrop
- Matt Moore as Ted Barnacle
- Frederick Burton as Amos Bussard
- Amelia Summerville as Mrs. Bussard
- Elmer Grandin as John Bussard
- Constance Beaumar as Mathilda Bussard
- Helen Lindroth as Mrs. Winthrop

== Production ==
In her 5th film Marion Davies stars in this romantic comedy. This was Davies' first light comedy role and her first film with director Alan Dwan. Reviews were good. Variety stated it was Davies best film to date. Dwan remembered that although Davies stuttered and stammered, she was just fine once the cameras were rolling. This is the earliest extant Marion Davies film.

== Status ==
The film exists in the Library of Congress collection. A DVD was released by Edward Lorusso thru Grapevine Video.
