= A Regular Girl =

1919 film by James Young

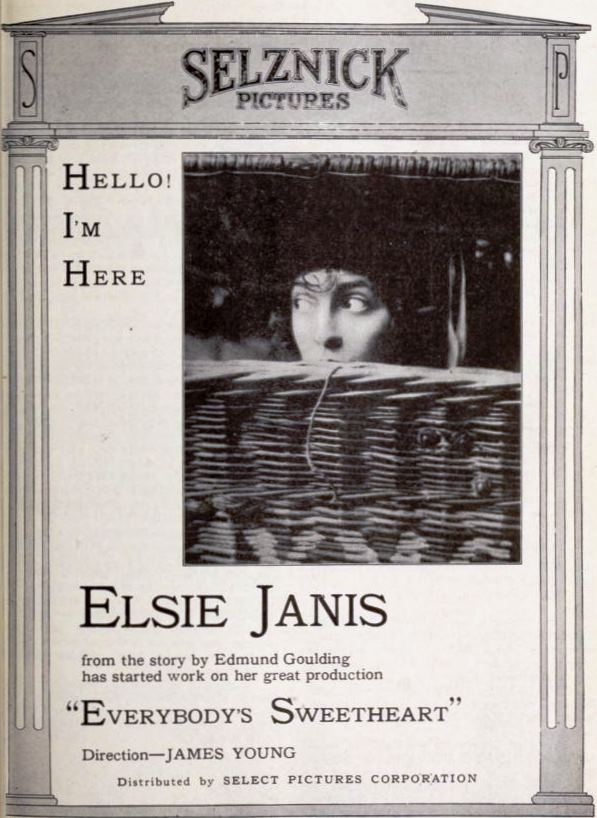
- Advertisement using the working title Everybody's Sweetheart
- Directed by: James Young
- Written by: Edmund Goulding; Frances Marion
- Produced by: Selznick Pictures Corporation
- Starring: Elsie Janis; Matt Moore
- Cinematography: André Barlatier French Wikipedia
- Production company: Selznick Pictures
- Distributed by: Select Films; Select Pictures Corporation
- Release date: November 10, 1919
- Running time: 50 minutes; 5 reels
- Country: United States
- Language: Silent (English intertitles)

A Regular Girl is a lost 1919 American silent comedy film directed by James Young and starring comedian Elsie Janis. It was produced by Lewis J. Selznick.

The film had the working title Everybody's Sweetheart, a moniker associated with Janis as a vaudeville performer.

== Cast ==
- Elsie Janis as Elizabeth Schuyler
- L. Rogers Lytton as Her Father (credited as Robert Lyton)
- Matt Moore as Robert King
- Robert Ayerton as Butler
- Tammany Young as Mac
- Ernie Adams as Shorty
- Jerry Delaney as Slim
- Frank Murdock as Red
- Jeffreys Lewis as Mrs. Murphy (credited as Mrs. Jeffreys Lewis)
