= Captain Kidd's Kids =

1919 film

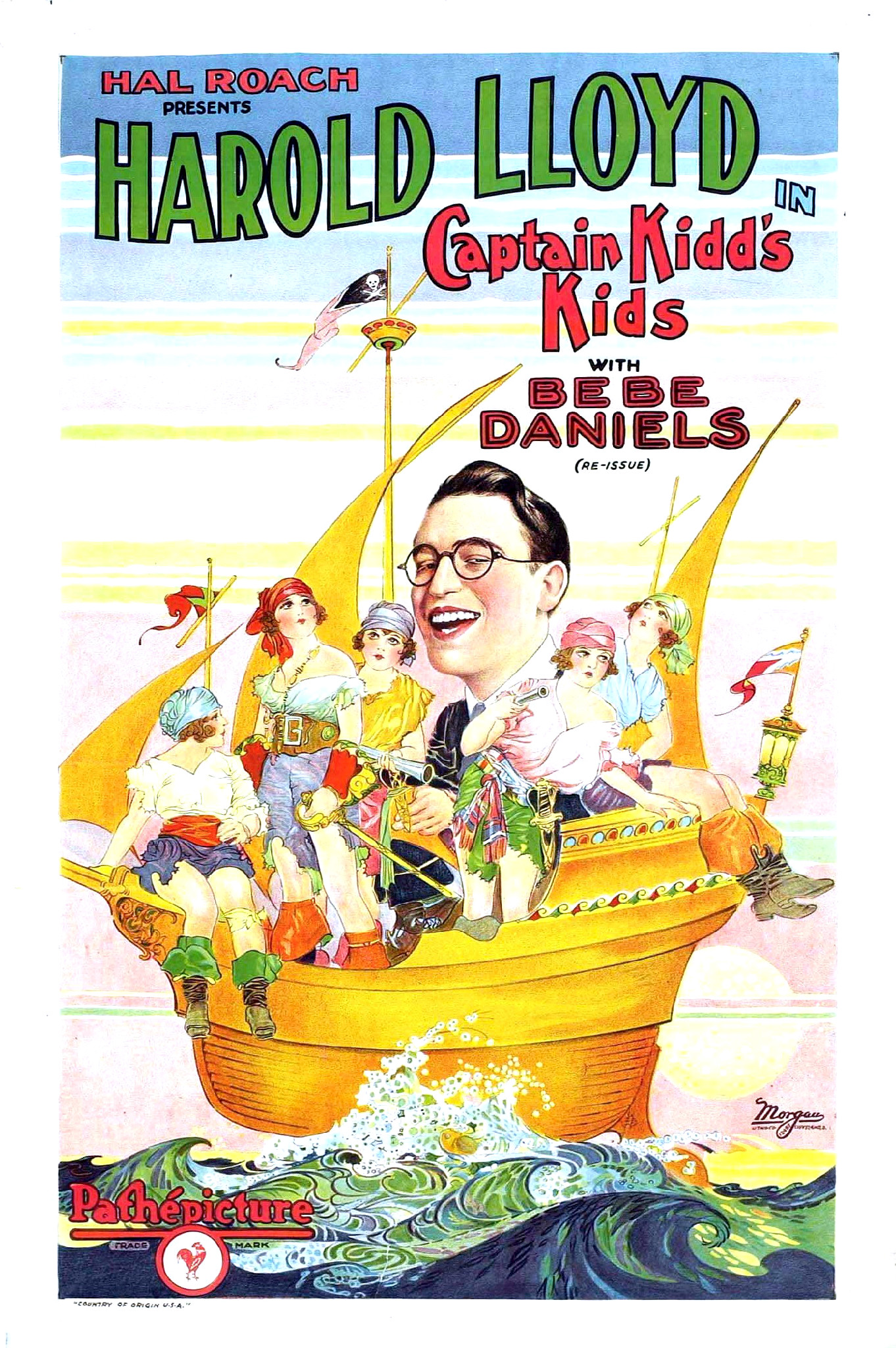
- Theatrical poster to Captain Kidd's Kids
- Directed by: Hal Roach
- Produced by: Hal Roach
- Starring: Harold Lloyd
- Distributed by: Rolin Films
- Release date: November 30, 1919
- Running time: 20 minutes
- Country: United States
- Languages: Silent; English intertitles

Captain Kidd's Kids is a 1919 American short comedy film featuring Harold Lloyd. It marked the last film Bebe Daniels worked on as Lloyd's leading lady. Prints of this film exist in the film archives of the UCLA Film & Television Archive and Filmoteca Española.

== Plot ==
The Boy, a wealthy young man, awakens on his wedding day with a huge hangover after a wild bachelor party. When he is sober enough to call his fiancee, The Girl tells him that her overbearing mother has learned of the previous night's party and has forbidden the marriage to take place. Instead, the mother is taking her on a cruise to the Canary Islands. The Boy and his valet quickly board a ship setting sail to that destination. The Boy falls asleep and dreams he and his valet have been thrown overboard by robbers. The two are rescued, but it is by a shipload of hostile female pirates. The valet turns on The Boy to ingratiate himself with the pirates. The boy is put to work as the cook's assistant but causes so much chaos in the ship's galley that he is sentenced to walk the plank. The Girl, who is one of the pirates, tries to rescue the boy with the aid of a group of male pirates. After a series of escapes and battles, The Boy is about to be hanged when he awakens from his dream. He encounters The Girl and musters the courage to forcefully confront her disapproving mother and drive her away. The Boy also turns on his valet for his treachery in the dream.

== Cast ==
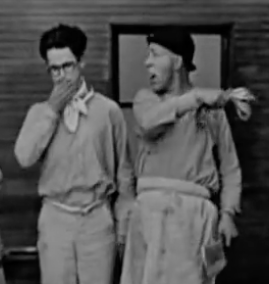
Harold Lloyd (left) and Fred C. Newmeyer in a screenshot from the film

- Harold Lloyd as The Boy
- Bebe Daniels as The Girl
- Snub Pollard as The Valet
- Fred C. Newmeyer as Ah Nix (Chinese Cook) (as Fred Newmeyer)
- Helen Gilmore as The Girl's mother
- Charles Stevenson as Servant (as Charles E. Stevenson)
- Noah Young as Big pirate
- Marie Mosquini as Pirate girl
- Sammy Brooks as Small pirate

== See also ==
- Harold Lloyd filmography
