= The Marathon (film) =

1919 film

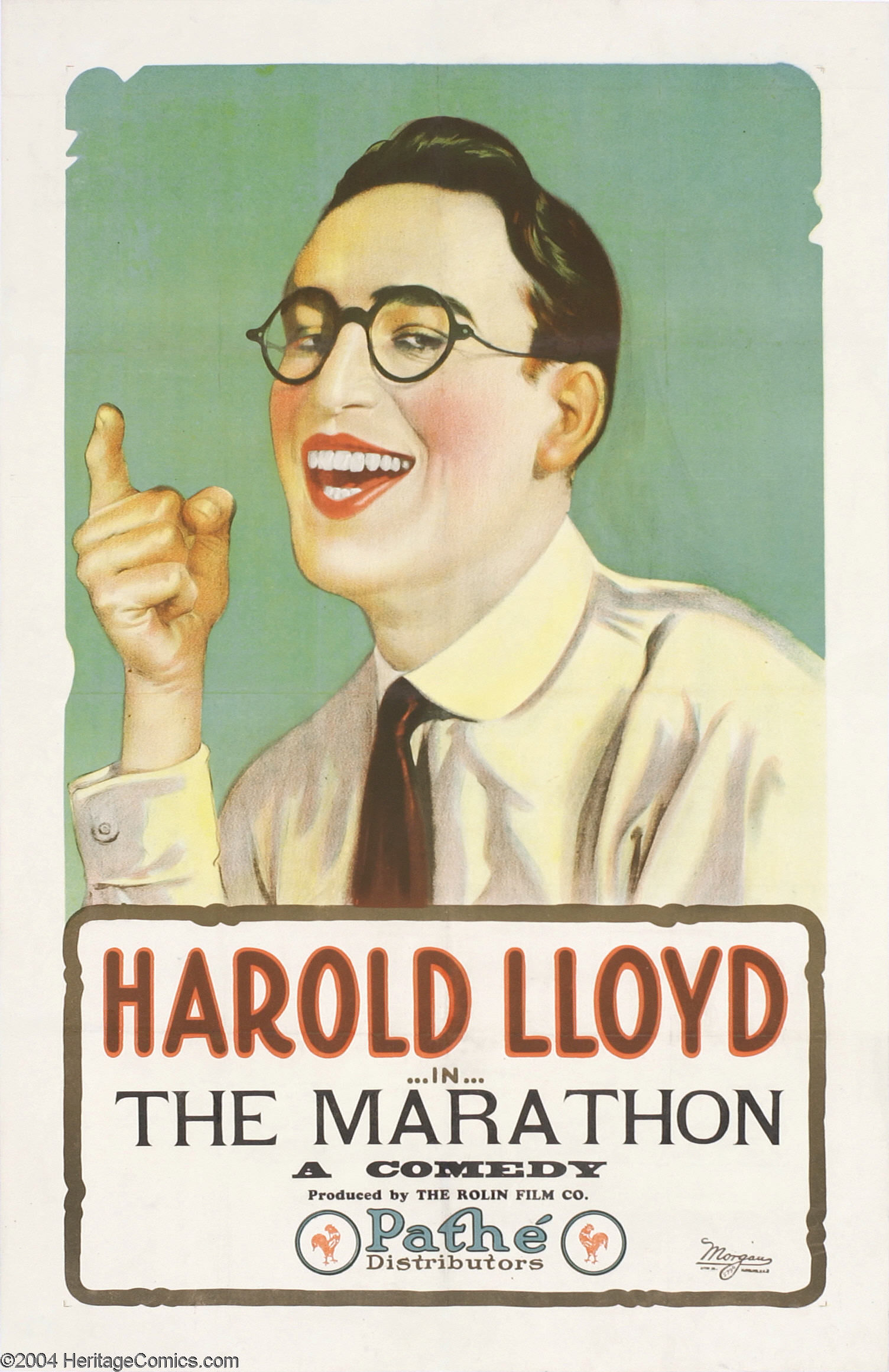
- Theatrical poster to The Marathon
- Directed by: Alfred J. Goulding
- Produced by: Hal Roach
- Starring: Harold Lloyd
- Release date: May 25, 1919
- Running time: 10 minutes
- Country: United States
- Language: Silent (English intertitles)

The Marathon is a 1919 American short comedy film starring Harold Lloyd. A print of the film survives in the film archive at George Eastman House.

== Plot ==
Bebe is besieged by suitors who want to take her to watch a local marathon. Bebe's father, a former heavyweight boxer, scares off all the suitors but Snub who wins him over by offering him a cigar. Not long afterward, Harold arrives to woo Bebe too. He gets into a scuffle with both Snub and Bebe's father. The police are summoned. Harold flees Bebe's house in a hurry and becomes entangled among the marathon runners who also angrily pursue him.

== Cast ==
- Harold Lloyd
- Snub Pollard
- Bebe Daniels
- Sammy Brooks
- Lew Harvey
- Wallace Howe
- Gus Leonard
- Gaylord Lloyd
- Marie Mosquini
- Fred C. Newmeyer
- William Petterson
- Dorothea Wolbert
- Noah Young
