= Soft Money (film) =

1919 film

- Directed by: Vincent P. Bryan; Hal Roach
- Written by: H.M. Walker
- Produced by: Hal Roach
- Starring: Harold Lloyd
- Cinematography: Walter Lundin
- Release date: September 28, 1919
- Country: United States
- Languages: Silent; English intertitles

Soft Money is a 1919 American short comedy film featuring Harold Lloyd. The film is considered to be lost.

== Cast ==
- Harold Lloyd
- Snub Pollard
- Bebe Daniels
- Billy Bray
- Sammy Brooks
- Lige Conley (credited as Lige Cromley)
- Charles Inslee
- Edna La Badie
- Gus Leonard
- Marie Mosquini
- Fred C. Newmeyer
- Billie Oakley
- Loyola O'Connor
- E.J. Ritter
- Charles Stevenson (credited as Charles E. Stevenson)
- Chase Thorne
- Noah Young
