= His Only Father =

1919 film

- Directed by: Hal Roach; Frank Terry
- Written by: H. M. Walker
- Produced by: Hal Roach
- Starring: Harold Lloyd
- Cinematography: Walter Lundin
- Release date: October 19, 1919
- Country: United States
- Languages: Silent; English intertitles

His Only Father is a 1919 American short comedy film directed by Hal Roach and Frank Terry, and starring Harold Lloyd. This was the last one-reel short Lloyd worked on before going on to two reelers with his next film, Bumping into Broadway. This film is believed to be lost.

== Cast ==
- Harold Lloyd
- Snub Pollard
- Bebe Daniels
- Sammy Brooks
- Lige Conley (credited as Lige Cromley)
- Frank Daniels
- Charles Inslee
- Mark Jones
- Dee Lampton
- Gus Leonard
- Marie Mosquini
- Fred C. Newmeyer (credited as Fred Newmeyer)
- H.L. O'Connor
- Charles Stevenson (credited as Charles E. Stevenson)
- Noah Young

== See also ==
- Harold Lloyd filmography
- List of lost films
