= Solomon in Society =

1922 film

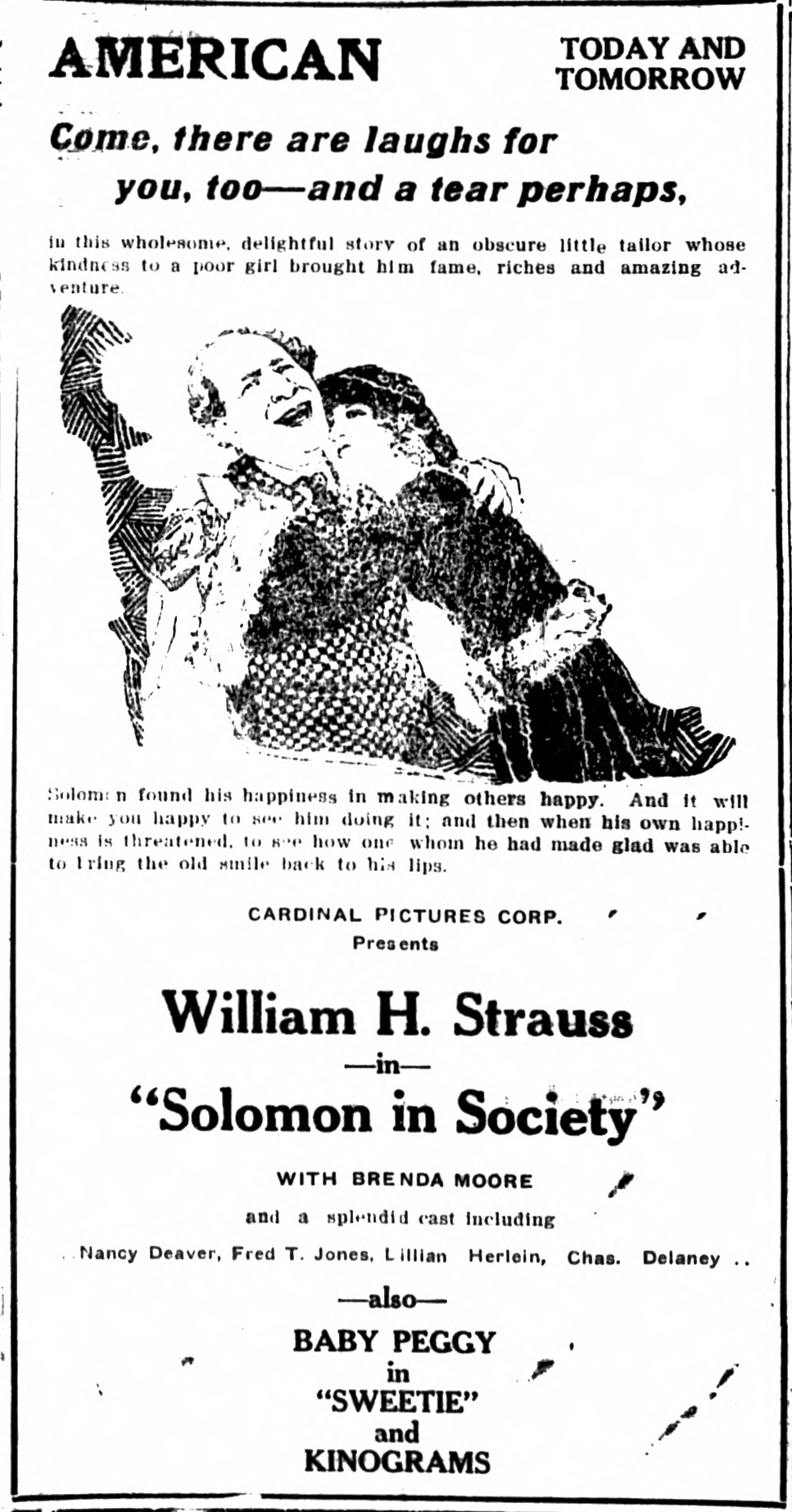
- Newspaper advertisement
- Directed by: Lawrence C. Windom
- Written by: Carl Krusada
- Produced by: Carl Krusada
- Starring: Charles Delaney; Lillian Herlein
- Cinematography: Edward Paul
- Production company: Cardinal Pictures
- Distributed by: American Releasing Corporation
- Release date: December 31, 1922
- Running time: 60 minutes
- Country: United States
- Languages: Silent; English intertitles

Solomon in Society is a 1922 American silent drama film directed by Lawrence C. Windom and starring Charles Delaney and Lillian Herlein.

== Cast ==
- William H. Strauss as I. Solomon
- Brenda Moore as Rosie Solomon
- Nancy Deaver as Mary Bell
- Charles Delaney asFrank Wilson
- Fred T. Jones as Orlando Kolin
- Lillian Herlein as Mrs. Levy
- Charles Brook as The Butler

== Bibliography ==
- Connelly, Robert B. The Silents: Silent Feature Films, , Volume 40, Issue 2. December Press, 1998.
- Munden, Kenneth White. The American Film Institute Catalog of Motion Pictures Produced in the United States, Part 1. University of California Press, 1997.
