= Sinners in the Sun =

1932 film

- Directed by: Alexander Hall
- Written by: Waldemar Young; Samuel Hoffenstein
- Based on: the short story "The Beachcomber" by Mildred Cram
- Starring: Carole Lombard; Chester Morris; Adrienne Ames; Alison Skipworth
- Cinematography: Ray June
- Music by: John Leipold
- Production company: Paramount Pictures
- Distributed by: Paramount Pictures
- Release date: May 13, 1932
- Running time: 70 minutes
- Country: United States
- Language: English

Sinners in the Sun is a 1932 American pre-Code romantic drama film directed by Alexander Hall, and starring Carole Lombard, Chester Morris, Adrienne Ames, and Alison Skipworth. It was produced and distributed by Paramount Pictures.

== Plot ==
Doris Blake works as a top model for Louis in a very chic New York City dress shop. Her boyfriend Jimmie Martin is an auto mechanic. When he comes to pick her up, he talks about marriage, but she argues they both have no money. At a picnic, they quarrel again, and he breaks up with her.

Later, Doris meets the very rich, very eccentric Claire Kinkaid at the shop. To Doris's surprise, Claire does not much care for her own lavish lifestyle. Claire asks her if she has a boyfriend; when Doris tells her they broke up, Claire tells her that a boyfriend is the only thing she wants. Jimmie is standing outside. When Doris and Claire step out, he pretends to be fixing a fancy car, which turns out to be Claire's. When he wishes he could drive it, she invites him to do just that. Then, she offers him a job as her chauffeur. He accepts because he wants a change of scenery, far away from Doris.

Later, Jimmie drives Claire to a charity fashion show, where Doris is one of the models (though Jimmie has to leave before she goes on). Doris "borrows" a swimsuit and goes for a swim before the show. She meets Eric Nelson. When he becomes too fresh and kisses her, Doris slaps him, twice, and swims away. Eric sees her modeling. At the end of the party, she meets his wife. Eric assures her they will be divorcing soon. On their way home, Claire proposes to Jimmie, and promises him a wonderful time in her 50-room mansion; he says "Aw, I don't want to marry anybody!"

Meanwhile, Eric gets Doris to go out with him night after night. Her father becomes fed up with her involvement (albeit innocent) with a married man and throws her out. When Jimmie finds out Doris has been thrown out, he tells Claire he is quitting. Claire inquires if his quitting is because of the girl he cannot forget, then, again, asks him again to marry her. This time, he accepts.

When Doris reads in the newspaper that Jimmie and Claire have wed and she is upset. Previously, had turned down jewelry from Eric, now she accepts his gifts, an apartment, and lavish spending on her. Doris also acquires an unwanted admirer, Eric's friend Ridgeway, who has grown tired of his girl, Lil. Lil confides to her friend Doris that she is in love with Ridgeway; Doris claims she will never again love a man. Lil, knowing she has lost Ridgeway, takes poison and dies.

Jimmie and Doris each in their own way live the fast life. They run into each other at a restaurant. He lashes out at her verbally and stalks out. Then, Ridgeway shows up with the news that Eric has patched things up with his wife. Ridgeway gives her a check from Eric and makes it clear he expects to take Eric's place. Doris tells him to get out. Jimmie tells Claire he finally realizes what he is, a kept man. They part amicably.

Eric returns from Europe and finds Doris working as a dressmaker, and tells her that he has gotten a divorce. He wants to get back with her and says, "I'll marry you if you want me to." Doris is not interested. Just then, Jimmie's dog finds her. Jimmie has struck out on his own in his own business. The couple reconcile.

== Cast ==
- Carole Lombard as Doris Blake
- Chester Morris as Jimmie Martin
- Adrienne Ames as Claire Kinkaid
- Alison Skipworth as Mrs. Blake
- Cary Grant as Ridgeway
- Walter Byron as Eric Nelson
- Rita La Roy as Lil
- Reginald Barlow as Mr. Blake
- Zita Moulton as Florence Nelson
- Luke Cosgrave as Grandfather Blake
- Ida Lewis as Grandmother Blake
- Russ Clark as Fred Blake
- Frances Moffett as Mrs. Fred Blake
- Pierre de Ramey as Louis
- Veda Buckland as Emma

== Reception ==
The Times called the film a "display of luxury", and that its chief merit is the "slickness of it luxurious accompaniment". They particularly praised the performance of Ames, writing: "Miss Adrienne Ames, though afflicted with dialogue of the utmost crudity, gives a genuine touch of character to the rich young woman whom our hero erroneously marries".

Mordaunt Hall, in his New York Times review, called it "a lavishly produced, trivial story" and " all more than slightly incredible". He thought that, while many of the cast gave competent or good performances, Morris was miscast.

== Sources ==
- Deschner, Donald (1973). The Complete Films of Cary Grant. Citadel Press. ISBN 0-8065-0376-9.
