= William P. Carleton =

American actor (1872–1947)

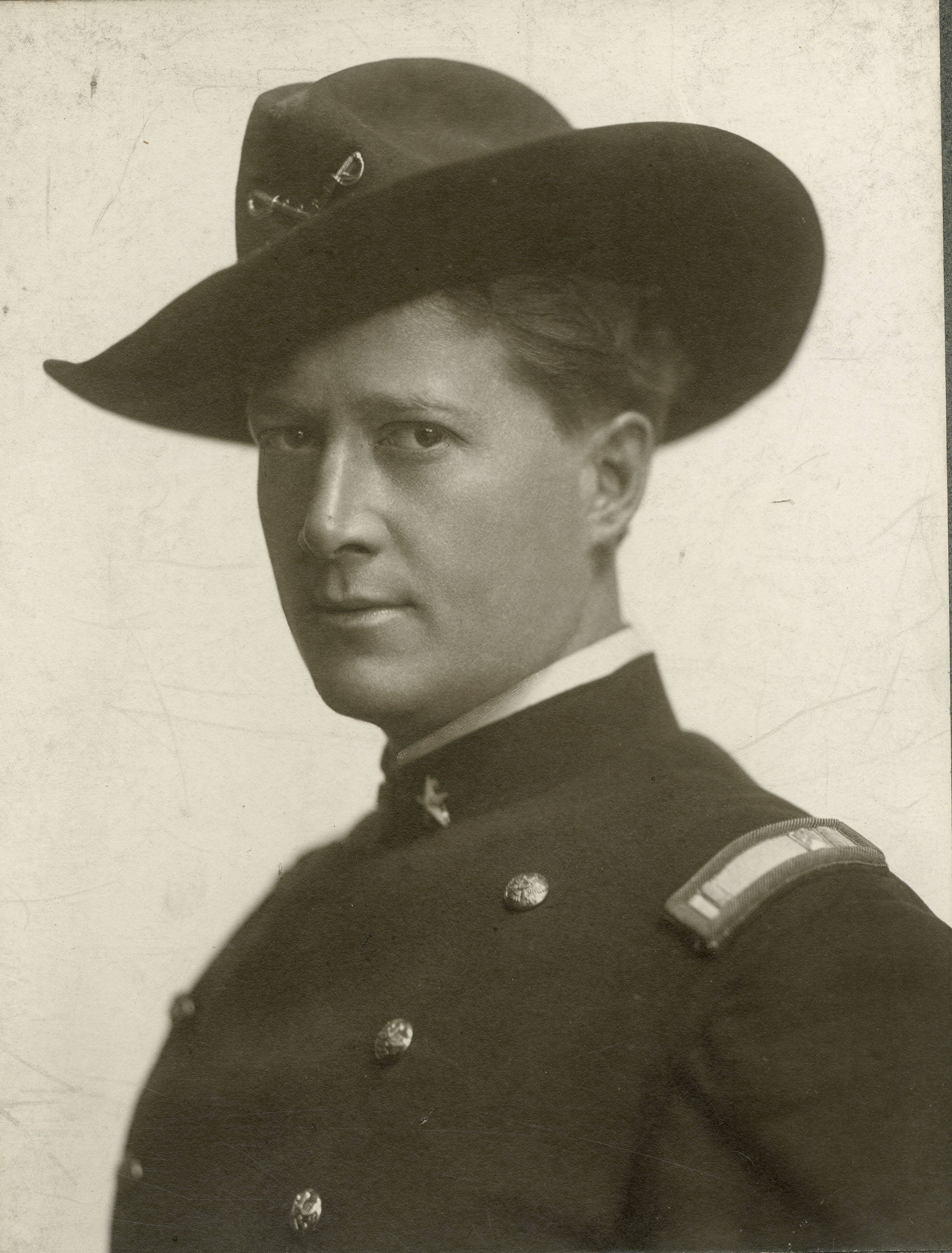
- Carleton in 1906
- Born: October 3, 1872; London, England
- Died: April 6, 1947 (aged 74); Hollywood, California, U.S.
- Years active: 1919-1944
- Spouse: Toby Claude (?-1903)

William P. Carleton (October 3, 1872 – April 6, 1947) was a silent film actor who appeared in 40 films between 1919 and 1944. He is sometimes billed as William Carleton Jr.. Carleton was born in London and was briefly married to actress Toby Claude; they divorced in 1903. He was a distant cousin of Sir Guy Standing and other Standing acting family members.

On April 6, 1947, Carleton died in Hollywood, California, as a result of injuries from an automobile accident. He was 74.

== Partial filmography ==
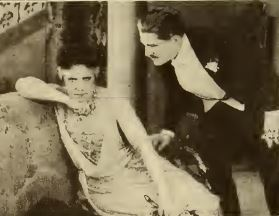
Carleton with Geraldine Farrar in The Riddle: Woman (1920)

- The Spark Divine (1919) - (billed as William Carleton, Jr.)
- A Society Exile (1919) - Sir Ralph Newell
- The Copperhead (1920) - Lieutenant Tom Hardy
- The Amateur Wife (1920) - Cosmo Spotiswood
- His House in Order (1920) - Minor Role
- The Flapper (1920) - Richard Channing
- The Riddle: Woman (1920) - Eric Helsingor
- The Inside of the Cup (1921) - John Hodder
- Good Women (1921) - Sir Richard Egglethorpe
- Straight from Paris (1921) - John Van Austen
- Behind Masks (1921) - Major Nigel Forrest
- A Wife's Awakening (1921) - Howard
- What No Man Knows (1921) - Drake Blackly
- Morals (1921) - Sir Marcus Ordeyne
- The Law and the Woman (1922) - Julian Rolfe
- Bobbed Hair (1922) - Paul Lamont
- The Worldly Madonna (1922) - John McBride
- Domestic Relations (1922) - Judge James Benton
- Our Leading Citizen (1922) - Oglesby Fendle, capitalist
- The Danger Point (1922) - James Benton
- The Truth About Wives (1923) - Alfred Emerson
- The Tie That Binds (1923) - Daniel Kenyon
- Sinner or Saint (1923) - Paul Reynolds
- Homeward Bound (1923) - Rodney
- Half-A-Dollar-Bill (1924) - Captain Duncan McTeague
- Charlie Chan's Chance (1932) - (uncredited)
- Ann Vickers (1933) - Minor Role (uncredited)
- Girl Without a Room (1933) - Academy Judge (uncredited)
- Rendezvous at Midnight (1935) - Judge
- The Perfect Clue (1935) - Jerome Stewart
- Les Misérables (1935) - First Judge in Arras (uncredited)
- Two Sinners (1935) - Heggie
- Bad Boy (1935) - Col. Good (uncredited)
- The Adventures of Frank Merriwell (1936, Serial) - Charles Merriwell [Chs.10-12]
- The Bohemian Girl (1936) - Count Arnheim
- The Return of Jimmy Valentine (1936) - Warden Keeley
- The Border Patrolman (1936) - Jeremiah Huntley
- Mystery Plane (1939) - Navy Commander
- Boys' Reformatory (1939) - Judge Robert H. Scott
- The Green Hornet Strikes Again! (1940, Serial) - Gloria's Father (uncredited)
- Wilson (1944) - Senator (uncredited) (final film role)
