= Devil's Lottery =

1932 film

- Directed by: Sam Taylor
- Screenplay by: Guy Bolton
- Based on: The Devil's Lottery by Nalbro Bartley
- Produced by: Sam Taylor
- Starring: Elissa Landi; Victor McLaglen; Alexander Kirkland; Ralph Morgan; Paul Cavanagh; Barbara Weeks
- Cinematography: Ernest Palmer
- Edited by: Harold D. Schuster
- Production company: Fox Film Corporation
- Distributed by: Fox Film Corporation
- Release date: March 27, 1932
- Running time: 78 minutes
- Country: United States
- Language: English

Devil's Lottery is a 1932 American pre-Code drama film directed by Sam Taylor and starring Elissa Landi, Victor McLaglen, Alexander Kirkland, Ralph Morgan, Paul Cavanagh and Barbara Weeks. The film was released on March 27, 1932, by Fox Film Corporation. The screenplay was based on the 1931 novel The Devil's Lottery by Nalbro Bartley.

== Plot ==
In England a group of sweepstakes winners are invited to a weekend party at a lavish country estate. Murder, heartbreak, and betrayal soon follow.

== Cast ==
- Elissa Landi as Evelyn Beresford
- Victor McLaglen as Jem Meech
- Alexander Kirkland as Stephen Alden
- Ralph Morgan as Captain Geoffrey Maitland
- Paul Cavanagh as Major Hugo Beresford
- Barbara Weeks as Joan Mather
- Beryl Mercer as Mrs. Mary Ann Meech
- Herbert Mundin as Trowbridge
- Halliwell Hobbes as Lord Litchfield
- Lumsden Hare as Inspector Avery
- Frank Atkinson as Summers the Butler
- Will Stanton as Dan Cooper the Bookie
- Ethel Griffies as Nurse
- Wilson Benge as Train Porter

== Bibliography ==
- Solomon, Aubrey. The Fox Film Corporation, 1915-1935: A History and Filmography. McFarland, 2011.
