= Gypsy O'Brien =

American theater and film actress

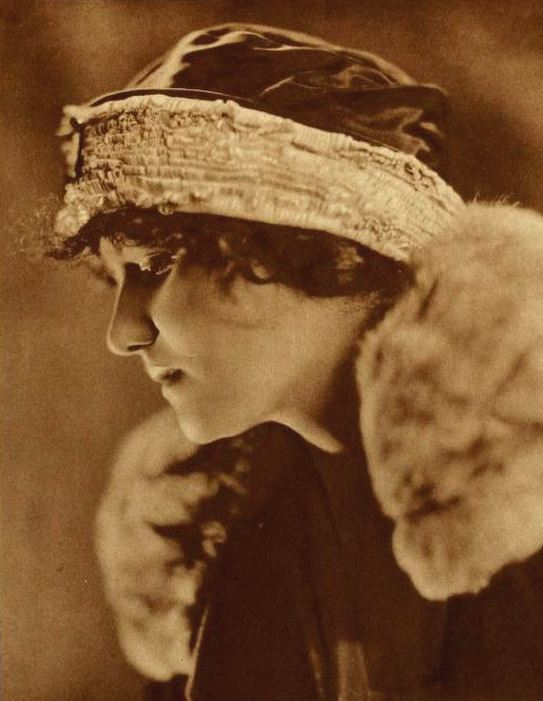
1922

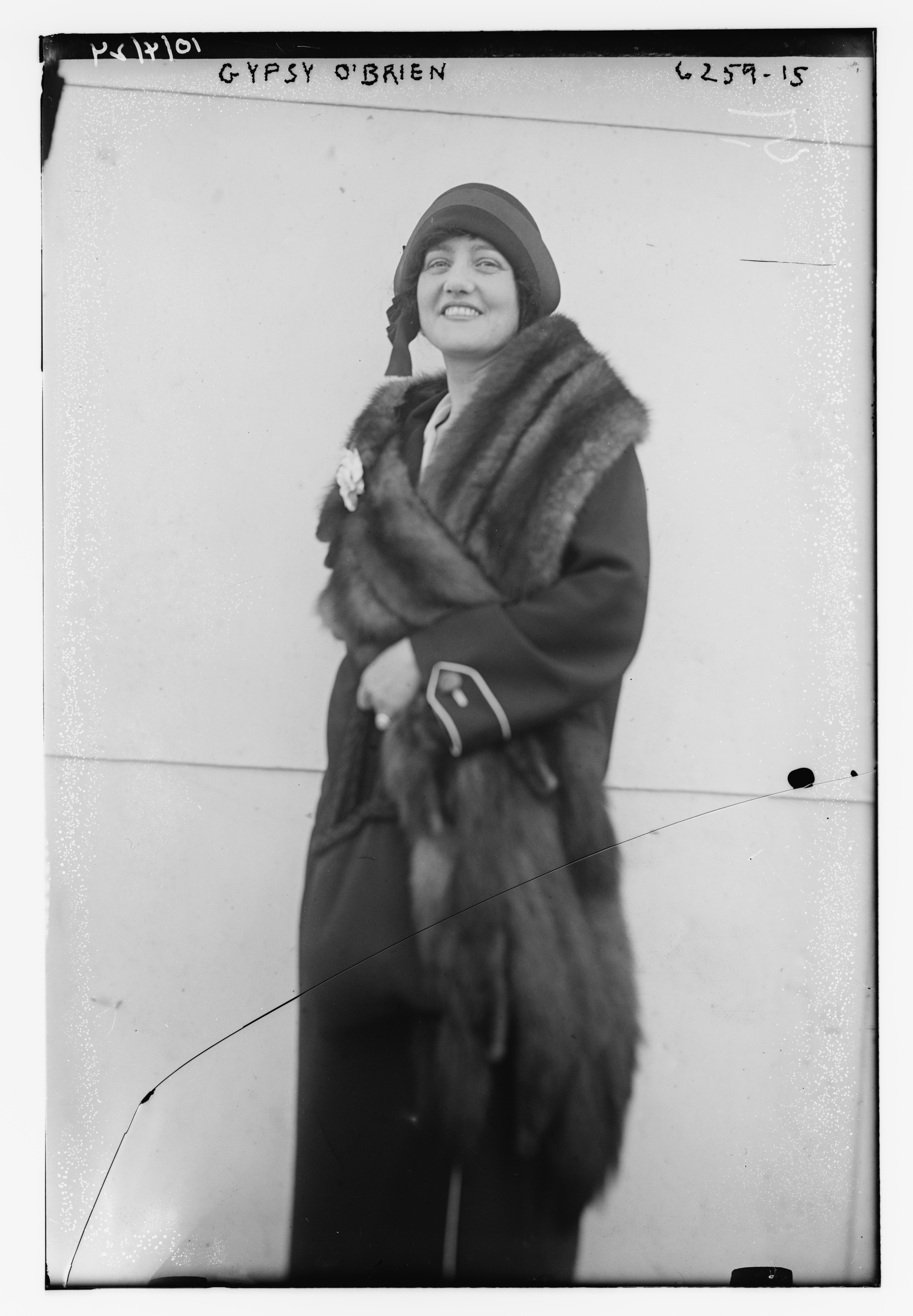
In 1900

Gypsy O'Brien (1889–1975) was a theater and film actress. Her theater performances included a role in Cheating Cheaters. She also appeared in Bunny at the Hudson Theatre. Her performance as the persecuted heroine was described as pretty and spirited. According to marketing materials she had titian hair. Her film debut was in The Soul Market in 1916. She portrayed an investigative reporter in Nothing But Lies.

== Filmography ==
- The Scarlet Runner (1916), a serial starring with Earle Williams
- The Soul Market (1916)
- Wanted: A Husband (1919)
- Nothing but Lies (1920) directed by Lawrence C. Windom
- The Master Mind (1920) with Lionel Barrymore
- Salvation Nell (1921)
- The Young Diana (1922)
- The Broken Silence (1922)
- Sinner or Saint (1923)
- Little Old New York (1923)
