= The Truth About Wives =

1923 silent film

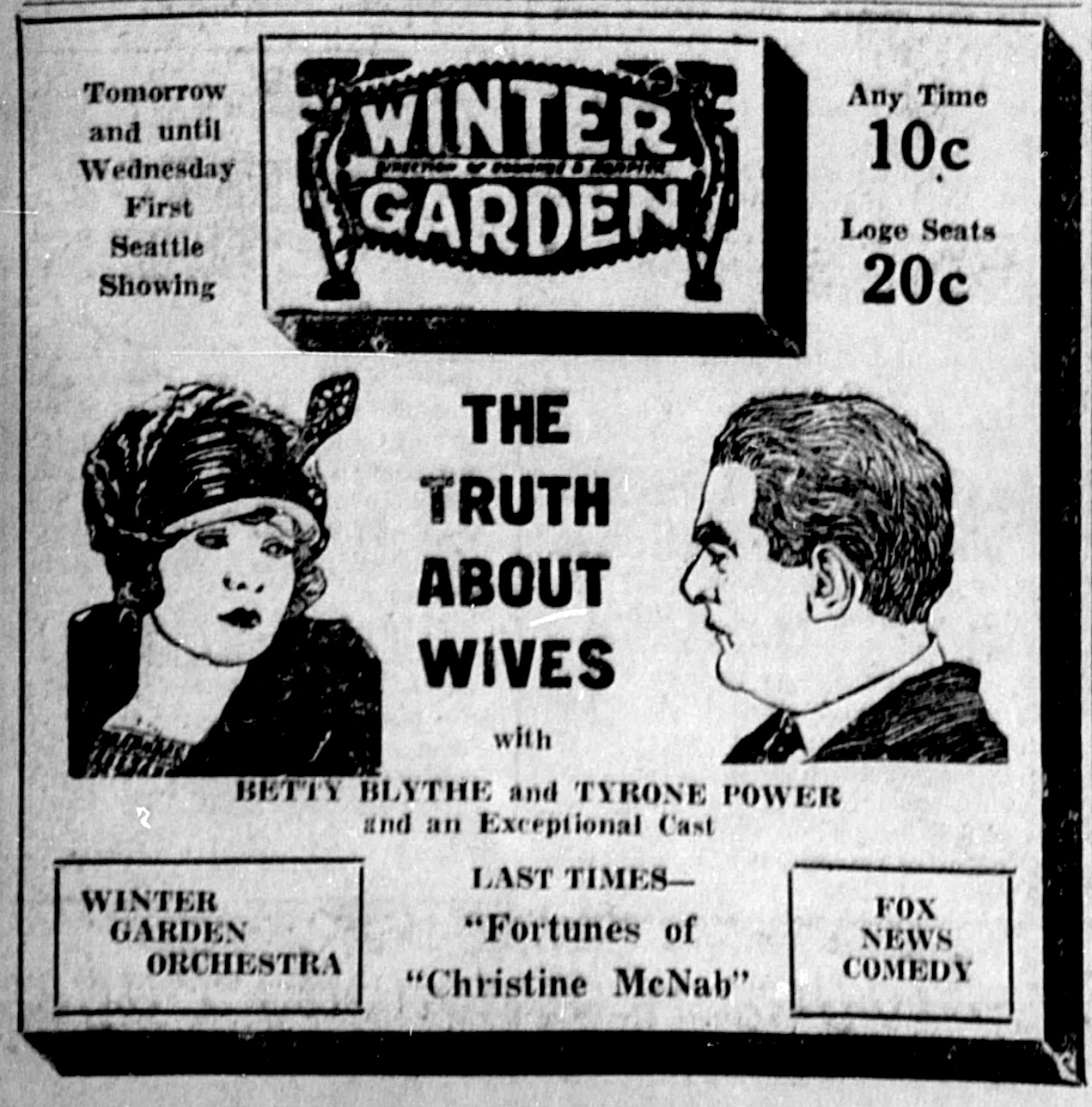
- Newspaper advertisement
- Directed by: Lawrence C. Windom
- Written by: E.C. Holland; Carl Krusada
- Starring: Betty Blythe; Tyrone Power Sr. William P. Carleton
- Cinematography: Edward Paul
- Production company: Betty Blythe Productions
- Distributed by: American Releasing Corporation
- Release date: February 3, 1923
- Running time: 60 minutes
- Country: United States
- Languages: Silent; English intertitles

The Truth About Wives is a 1923 American silent drama film directed by Lawrence C. Windom and starring Betty Blythe, Tyrone Power Sr. and William P. Carleton.

== Cast ==
- Betty Blythe as Helen Frazer
- Tyrone Power Sr. as Howard Hendricks
- William P. Carleton as Alfred Emerson
- Anna Luther as Letty Lorraine
- Fred C. Jones as Harold Lawton
- John Daly Murphy as Colonel Bob Alton
- Marcia Harris as Maid
- Nellie Parker Spaulding as Mrs. Anthony Frazer
- Frankie Evans as Baby

== Bibliography ==
- Robert B. Connelly. The Silents: Silent Feature Films, 1910-36, Volume 40, Issue 2. December Press, 1998.
