= Zita Moulton =

American model and actress (1883–1987)

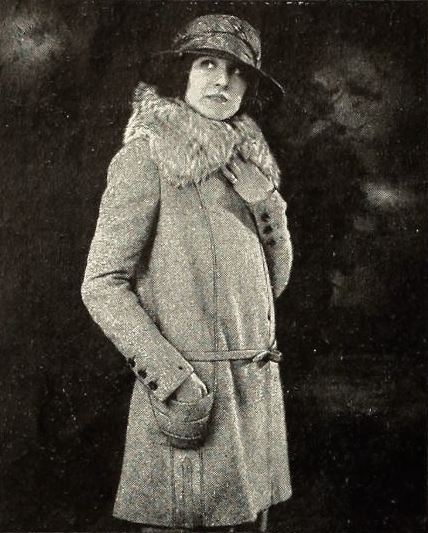
- Born: 1883; Boston, Massachusetts, US
- Died: December 25, 1987 (aged 104); El Paso, Texas, US
- Other name: Zita Gordon
- Education: Radcliffe College
- Occupations: Actress, model, dress seller
- Years active: 1921–1937
- Spouse: Harvey M. Gordon
- Children: 2

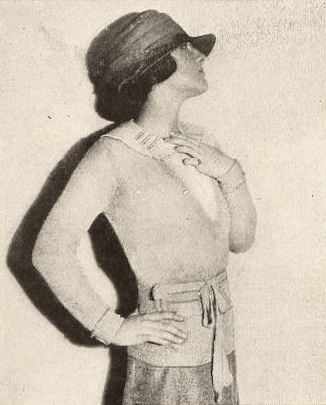
From a 1923 clothing advertisement

Zita Moulton (1883 – December 25, 1987), also known as Zita Gordon, was an American model and actress who appeared in theatre and film in the 1920s and 30s. She was featured in fashion photographs throughout the period and performed in Duffy stage productions.

A Bostonian, Moulton began performing on stage after a bet from her fiancé at the time that she would be able to get an acting job within 24 hours. Performing in productions starting in 1921, she had a number of main roles before being cast in multiple films alongside Francis X. Bushman starting in 1923. These shows increased her popularity and she was featured in many fashion magazines of the time, including Vogue. She continued in theatre and film roles until she left acting in 1937 before moving to El Paso, Texas, and becoming a dress shop owner and spending her time caring for stray and sick animals.

== Career ==
Born in Boston, Moulton graduated from Radcliffe College. At the age of 16 while engaged, she made a bet with her fiancé that she would be able to get hired for the theatre within 24 hours. She went to a local Boston booking agency and asked for a part in a stage play, and was assigned to a theatre company located in Toronto, Canada, for two weeks before being assigned to another company for a longer five-month contract. She later had a major role in a 1921 production of Leo Ditrichstein's Toto as Baroness de Verdiere, one of the six main cast members. Then she was given the lead role in Smooth as Silk that same year and kept on with the production until 1922. She was contracted beginning in 1923 to films involving Francis X. Bushman and Beverly Bayne, starring in their 1923 release of Modern Marriage. After the film's premiere, she and the other actors went on tour across the United States and acted out the first scene of the film on theatre stages across the country. This promotional tour was the first "personal appearance" done by film actors.

Her theatre roles resulted in her being featured in glamour magazines, including Vogue, Town & Country, and Theatre Weekly. Throughout the 1920s, she was shown in advertisements as a "clothes horse" for presenting clothing styles and brands. In 1932, she was signed for roles in Sinners in the Sun and alongside George Arliss in A Successful Calamity.

== Personal life ==
During her initial contract in Toronto, Moulton met a Canadian officer named Captain Harvey M. Gordon and they married six years afterwards. He became sick in 1953 and, in order to stay near him and his hospital, Moulton opened a dress shop in El Paso, Texas. Harvey Gordon died from his illness on May 10, 1955. Moulton continued living in El Paso until her death on December 25, 1987, at the age of 104.

Moulton's personal hobby was caring for animals, ranging from dogs to seagulls to seals, and she frequently had healing animals in her home. She considered the most important event in her life was her 1939 radio appearance on the Dave Elman's Hobby Lobby show where she discussed her hobby referred to as "Kindness To Animals".

== Theater ==
- Toto (1921) as Baroness de Verdiere
- Smooth as Silk (1921) as Rosina
- The Common Law (1922) as Rita Tevis
- Johnny Walker (1922) as Margery Dawes
- His Chinese Wife (1926) as Cecelia Sturgis
- This Thing Called Love (1929)
- The Skull (1929)

== Filmography ==
- Modern Marriage (1923) as Nita Blake
- Big Money (1930) as Michael
- The Expert (1932) as Miss Lippincott
- A Successful Calamity (1932)
- Sinners in the Sun (1932) as Florence Nelson
- The Tenderfoot (1932)
- Employees' Entrance (1933) as Marion
- Hoosier Schoolboy (1937) as school girl
- It Happened in Hollywood (1937) as Englishwoman
- The Awful Truth (1937) as Lady Fabian
