= Employees' Entrance =

1933 film

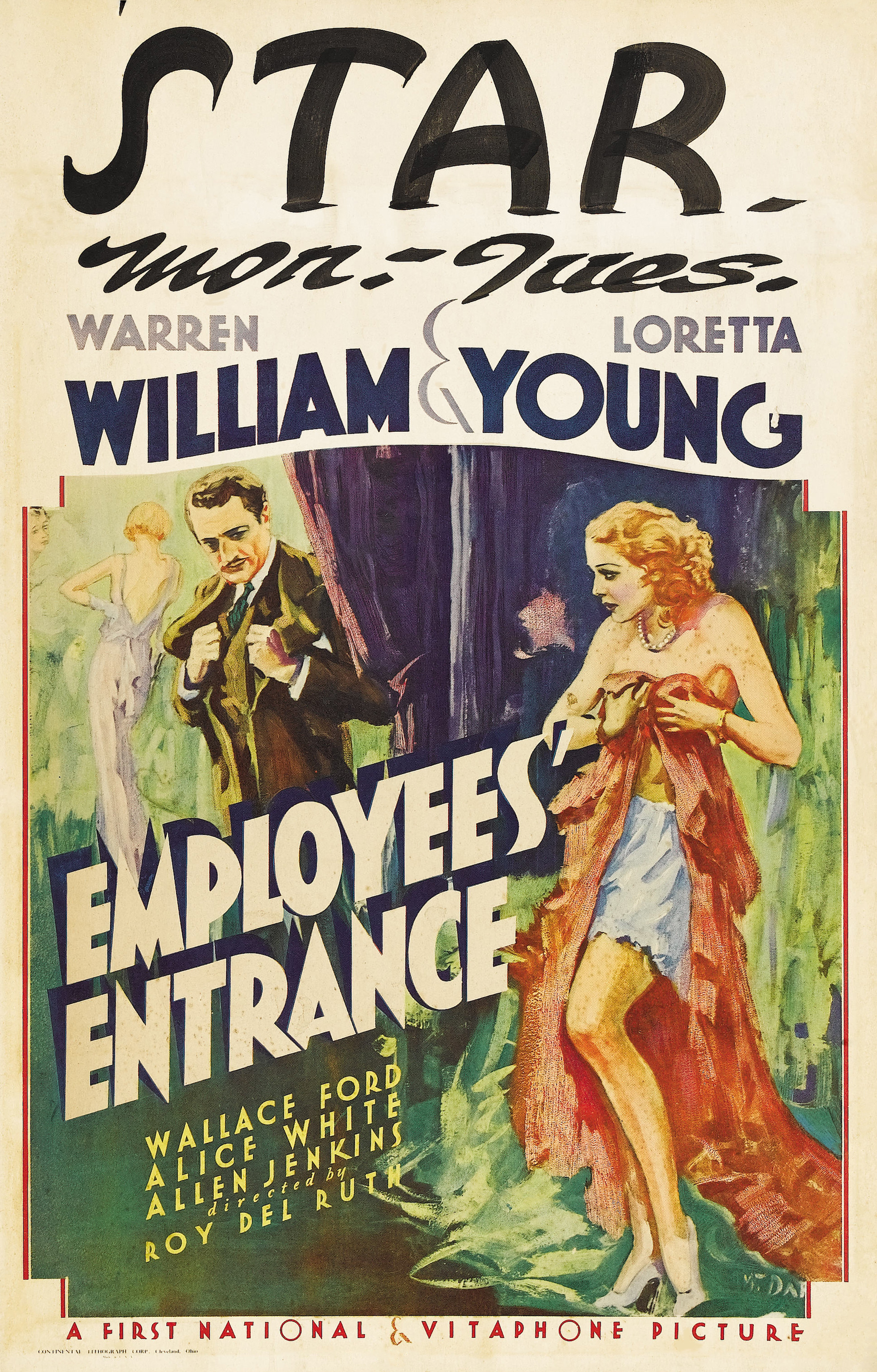
- Theatrical release poster
- Directed by: Roy Del Ruth
- Screenplay by: Robert Presnell Sr.
- Based on: A play by David Boehm
- Produced by: Lucien Hubbard (uncredited)
- Starring: Warren William; Loretta Young
- Cinematography: Barney McGill
- Edited by: James Gibbon
- Music by: Bernhard Kaun
- Production company: First National Pictures
- Distributed by: First National Pictures
- Release dates: January 20, 1933 (NYC); February 11, 1933 (US)
- Running time: 74–75 minutes
- Country: United States
- Language: English
- Budget: $188,000

Employees' Entrance is a 1933 pre-Code film about the devious manager of a New York department store (Warren William) and his romantic involvement with a reluctant new employee (Loretta Young). It was directed by Roy Del Ruth. In 2019, the film was selected by the Library of Congress for preservation in the National Film Registry for being "culturally, historically, or aesthetically significant".

== Plot ==
Kurt Anderson is the ruthless, hard-driving general manager of the Monroe department store. The store is a financial powerhouse because of Anderson's brutally efficient strategies and autocratic leadership.

When a new clothing supplier, Garfinkle, tells Anderson that part of the large first order will be delayed three days because of labor trouble, Anderson cancels the order and instructs his secretary to sue for damages. Garfinkle is ruined, but Anderson doesn't care.

After closing, Anderson overhears Madeline Walters playing a store piano. Broke and unemployed, she is going to apply to work at Monroe's first thing in the morning. When she finds out who he is, she allows herself to succumb to his power and artificial charm, which ensures she gets a job as a model in the clothing department.

With the Great Depression cutting into the store's business, Anderson demands new ideas from his department heads. When Martin West comes up with an innovative idea, Higgins, the longtime head of men's clothing does not approve; but Anderson is impressed. He promptly tells Martin to go ahead, and fires Higgins. Seeing promise in West, Anderson makes him his assistant. He tells his new protégé that he must devote himself completely to business and nothing else if he is to get ahead; he asks if Martin is married, and is relieved when the answer is no. Anderson, a compulsive philanderer, holds women in contempt, believing that all they seek is financial security and control over their husbands. He views marital commitment as incompatible with running a successful business. However, unbeknownst to Anderson, Martin and Madeleine have fallen in love. He tells her that he cannot marry until his position is more secure, but, on an impulse, does so anyway, though he keeps it a secret from Anderson. This puts a strain on the marriage.

Anderson doubles the salary of employee Polly Dale, (Alice White), to keep his nominal overseer, Denton Ross, occupied, leaving him a free hand to manage the store without interference. Higgins tries repeatedly to see Anderson to ask for his job back, but fails. Finally Higgins commits suicide by jumping out of a ninth floor store window. Martin is dismayed when Anderson is unperturbed by the news.

After the Wests quarrel at the annual office party about Martin's neglect of her, Anderson finds a vulnerable Madeleine alone and gets her drunk on champagne. When she decides to leave, he offers the inebriated Madeleine his upstairs hotel suite to rest and to clear her head. After she falls asleep on the bed, he enters the room and rapes her. The next day, an embarrassed Madeleine insists that Anderson leave her alone. During their heated conversation, she lets slip that she is married to Martin. After she quits and threatens to take her husband with her, Anderson tries to get Polly to seduce Martin, but she refuses. He then has Martin eavesdrop on the intercom while he summons Madeleine to his office. Martin learns of the times Madeleine slept with Anderson.

Madeleine unsuccessfully attempts suicide with poison, prompting a furious Martin to confront and threaten to kill his boss. Anderson, facing his own dismissal by cautious bankers afraid of his expensive plans, dares him to do it, even providing a gun. Martin shoots, but only inflicts a minor wound. When employees dash in, Anderson acts as if nothing had happened: Martin quits.

Ross manages to contact the store's frequently absent owner, Commodore Franklin Monroe, and gets his proxy just in time for the vote of the board of 40 directors. Anderson keeps his job. Polly, having just been told to pick out a new wardrobe so Anderson can take her to Paris, comes in with her dog, only to learn the holiday is off and to return the clothes. She flounces out in a huff, leaving the dog, whom Anderson deposits in a waste basket. He promotes Garfinkle, embittered and now just as ruthless as him, to be his new assistant; Garfinkle says he will try to ruin him. Anderson fully approves of the attitude change. The film ends with Anderson experiencing neither redemption nor punishment. In the final scene, Martin is reunited and reconciled with his recovering wife Madeline.

== Cast ==
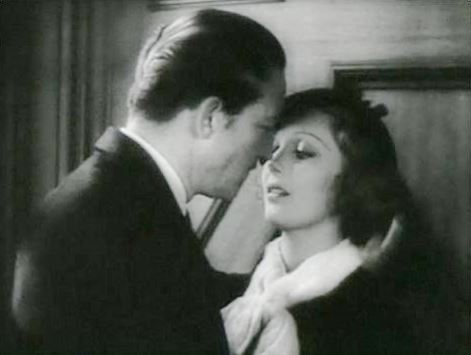
William corners Young in a scene from the film's trailer.

- Warren William as Kurt Anderson
- Loretta Young as Madeleine Walters West
- Wallace Ford as Martin West
- Alice White as Polly Dale
- Hale Hamilton as Commodore Franklin Monroe
- Albert Gran as Denton Ross
- Marjorie Gateson as Mrs. Lee Hickox, a customer apprehended by mistake as a shoplifter
- Ruth Donnelly as Miss Hall, Anderson's secretary
- Frank Reicher as Garfinkle
- Charles Sellon as Arnold Higgins
- Allen Jenkins as Sweeney, a store detective (uncredited)
- Zita Moulton as Marion

== Production ==
Warren William was not originally cast in the lead role; he replaced Hale Hamilton, who ended up playing a smaller part. Edward G. Robinson had also been offered the lead. The film took 23 days for principal photography. Although Alice White had been a major star for Warner Bros. Pictures at the time that silent films were giving way to sound pictures, by the time of Employees' Entrance her star had faded when the flapper craze abated. Her supporting role here garnered good reviews and sent her onto the comeback trail, but a scandal later in 1933 returned her to being a supporting actor.

== See also ==
- Pre-Code sex films
