= The Small Town Guy =

1917 silent film

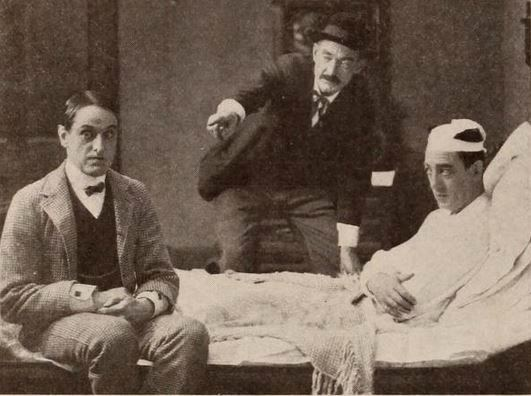
- Directed by: Lawrence C. Windom
- Written by: Freeman Tilden; H. Tipton Steck
- Starring: Taylor Holmes; Helen Ferguson; Fred Tiden
- Cinematography: Arthur Reeves
- Production companies: Perfection Pictures; Essanay Studios
- Distributed by: George Kleine System
- Release date: December 3, 1917
- Running time: 50 minutes
- Country: United States
- Languages: Silent; English intertitles

The Small Town Guy is a 1917 American silent comedy film directed by Lawrence C. Windom and starring Taylor Holmes, Helen Ferguson and Fred Tiden.

== Cast ==
- Taylor Holmes as Ernest Gledhill
- Helen Ferguson as Eleanor Ramsdell
- Fred Tiden as Swell Dresser
- Mark Ellison as Slim McClearn
- James F. Fulton as Major Dymon

== Bibliography ==
- Robert B. Connelly. The Silents: Silent Feature Films, 1910-36, Volume 40, Issue 2. December Press, 1998.
