= Homeward Bound (1923 film) =

1923 film by Ralph Ince

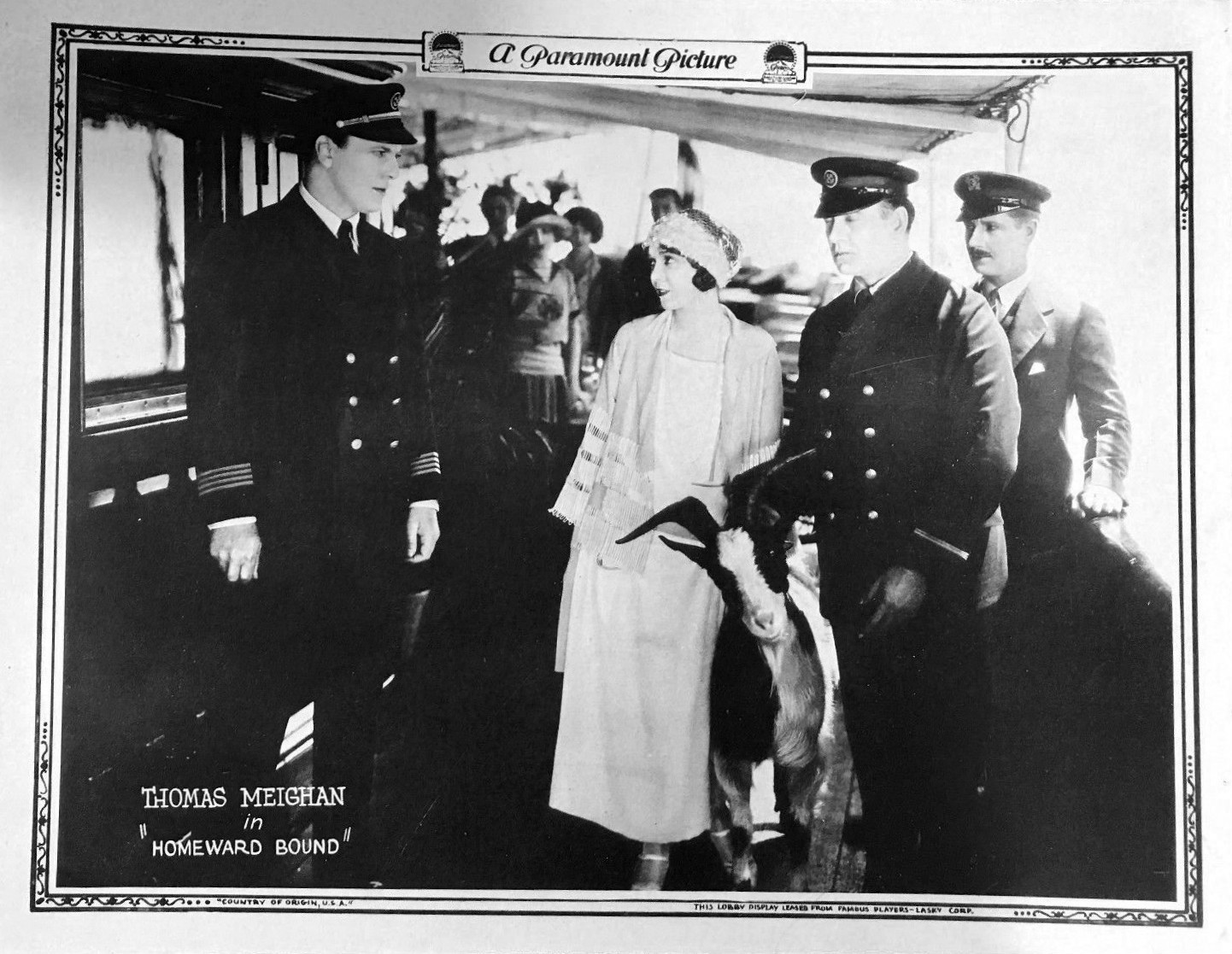
- Lobby card
- Directed by: Ralph Ince
- Screenplay by: Jack Cunningham; Paul Sloane
- Based on: "The Light to Leeward" by Peter B. Kyne
- Produced by: Adolph Zukor
- Starring: Thomas Meighan; Lila Lee; Charles S. Abbe; William P. Carleton; Hugh Cameron; Gus Weinberg
- Cinematography: Ernest Haller
- Production company: Famous Players–Lasky Corporation
- Distributed by: Paramount Pictures
- Release date: July 29, 1923
- Running time: 70 minutes
- Country: United States
- Language: Silent (English intertitles)

Homeward Bound is a 1923 American silent drama film directed by Ralph Ince and written by Peter B. Kyne, Jack Cunningham, and Paul Sloane. The film stars Thomas Meighan, Lila Lee, Charles S. Abbe, William P. Carleton, Hugh Cameron, and Gus Weinberg. The film was released on July 29, 1923, by Paramount Pictures.

== Cast ==
- Thomas Meighan as Jim Bedford
- Lila Lee as Mary Brent
- Charles S. Abbe as Rufus Brent
- William P. Carleton as Rodney
- Hugh Cameron as Murphy
- Gus Weinberg as Captain Svenson
- Maude Turner Gordon as Mrs. Brannigan
- Cyril Ring as Rufus Brent Jr.
- Katherine Spencer as Clarissa Wynwood

== Preservation ==
With no prints of Homeward Bound located in any film archives, it is a lost film.
