= The Amateur Wife =

1920 film by Edward Dillon

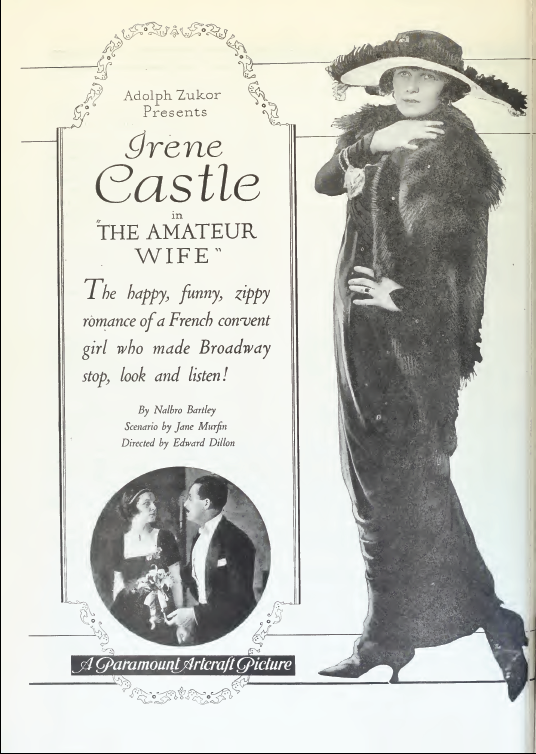
- Advertisement for the film
- Directed by: Edward Dillon
- Screenplay by: Nalbro Bartley; Jane Murfin
- Produced by: Adolph Zukor
- Starring: Irene Castle; William P. Carleton; Arthur Rankin; S.J. Warrington; Alex Saskins; Augusta Anderson
- Cinematography: Hal Young
- Production company: Famous Players–Lasky Corporation
- Distributed by: Paramount Pictures
- Release date: February 22, 1920
- Running time: 60 minutes
- Country: United States
- Language: Silent (English intertitles)

The Amateur Wife is a 1920 American silent comedy-drama romance directed by Edward Dillon and written by Nalbro Bartley and Jane Murfin. The film stars Irene Castle, William P. Carleton, Arthur Rankin, S.J. Warrington, Alex Saskins and Augusta Anderson. The film was released on February 22, 1920, by Paramount Pictures.

The Amateur Wife is a lost film.

== Plot ==
As described in a film magazine, Justine Spencer, daughter of the musical comedy queen Dodo Spencer, arouses the interest of wealthy bachelor Cosmo Spotiswood on account of her odd appearance and unhappy life. When Dodo Spencer is killed by a jilted admirer, he marries the young woman in a spirit of pity, and when she asks him to show some love for her, he tells her the true state of affairs. While he is abroad for a year, she secures a maid to brighten up her appearance and immediately is transformed into a pretty woman with a score of admirers. When her husband returns, she rebuffs him. Finally, convinced that she has awakened his love, she consents to live with him.

== Cast ==
- Irene Castle as Justine Spencer
- William P. Carleton as Cosmo Spotiswood
- Arthur Rankin as Billy Ferris
- S. J. Warmington as Randolph Ferguson
- Alex Saskins as Oliver Ferris (credited as A. Saskin)
- Augusta Anderson as Dodo Spencer
- Mrs. Charles Dewey as Loti
- Ellen Olson as Sara
