= American Releasing Corporation =

Defunct American film company

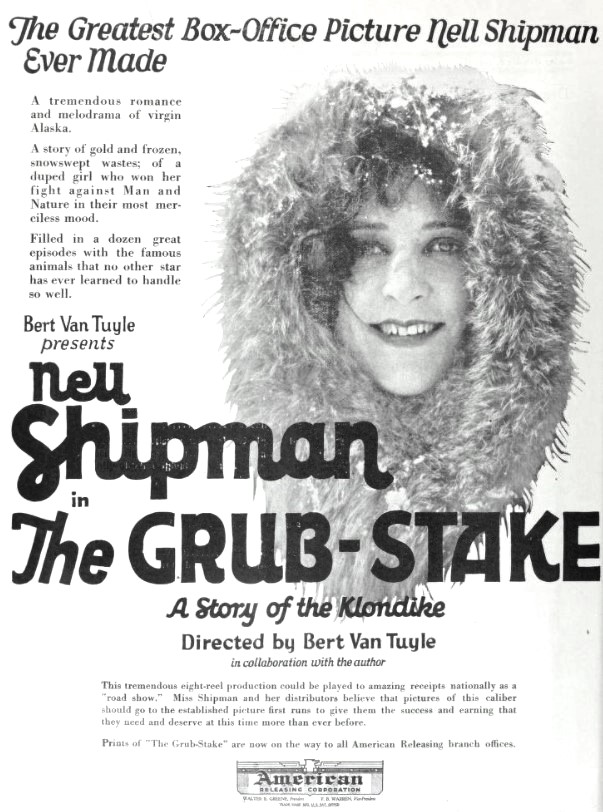
- Poster for the 1923 release The Grub-Stake
- Type: Corporation
- Industry: Motion pictures
- Founded: 1920
- Defunct: 1923

The American Releasing Corporation was an American film distribution company active during the silent era. The company was founded in 1920, but was primarily active from 1922 until 1923, producing or handling films of a generally higher quality than many independent studios who specialized in Poverty Row second features.

== Selected filmography ==
- The Challenge (1922)
- My Old Kentucky Home (1922)
- The Hidden Woman (1922)
- His Wife's Husband (1922)
- The Danger Point (1922)
- The Sign of the Rose (1922)
- Bluebeard, Jr. (1922)
- The Three Buckaroos (1922)
- When the Desert Calls (1922)
- Jan of the Big Snows (1922)
- Daring Danger (1922)
- Fools of Fortune (1922)
- The Great Alone (1922)
- The Cradle Buster (1922)
- The Other Side (1922)
- False Fronts (1922)
- The Mohican's Daughter (1922)
- Trail of the Axe (1922)
- The Woman He Loved (1922)
- The Bohemian Girl (1922)
- The Lying Truth (1922)
- What Fools Men Are (1922)
- Man's Law and God's (1922)
- Cardigan (1922)
- Destiny's Isle (1922)
- Solomon in Society (1922)
- The Super-Sex (1922)
- Queen of the Moulin Rouge (1922)
- Belle of Alaska (1922)
- Timothy's Quest (1922)
- Sisters (1922)
- That Woman (1922)
- Quicksands (1923)
- The Truth About Wives (1923)
- The Marriage Chance (1923)
- Modern Matrimony (1923)
- Good Men and Bad (1923)
- One Million in Jewels (1923)
- Vengeance of the Deep (1923)
- As a Man Lives (1923)
- The Grub-Stake (1923)
- Modern Marriage (1923)

== Bibliography ==
- Canjels, Rudmer. Distributing Silent Film Serials: Local Practices, Changing Forms, Cultural Transformation. Routledge, 2011.
- Slide, Anthony. Silent Topics: Essays on Undocumented Areas of Silent Film. Scarecrow Press, 2005.
- Soister, John T., Nicolella, Henry & Joyce, Steve. American Silent Horror, Science Fiction and Fantasy Feature Films, 1913-1929. McFarland, 2014.
