= The Grub-Stake =

1923 American silent melodrama film

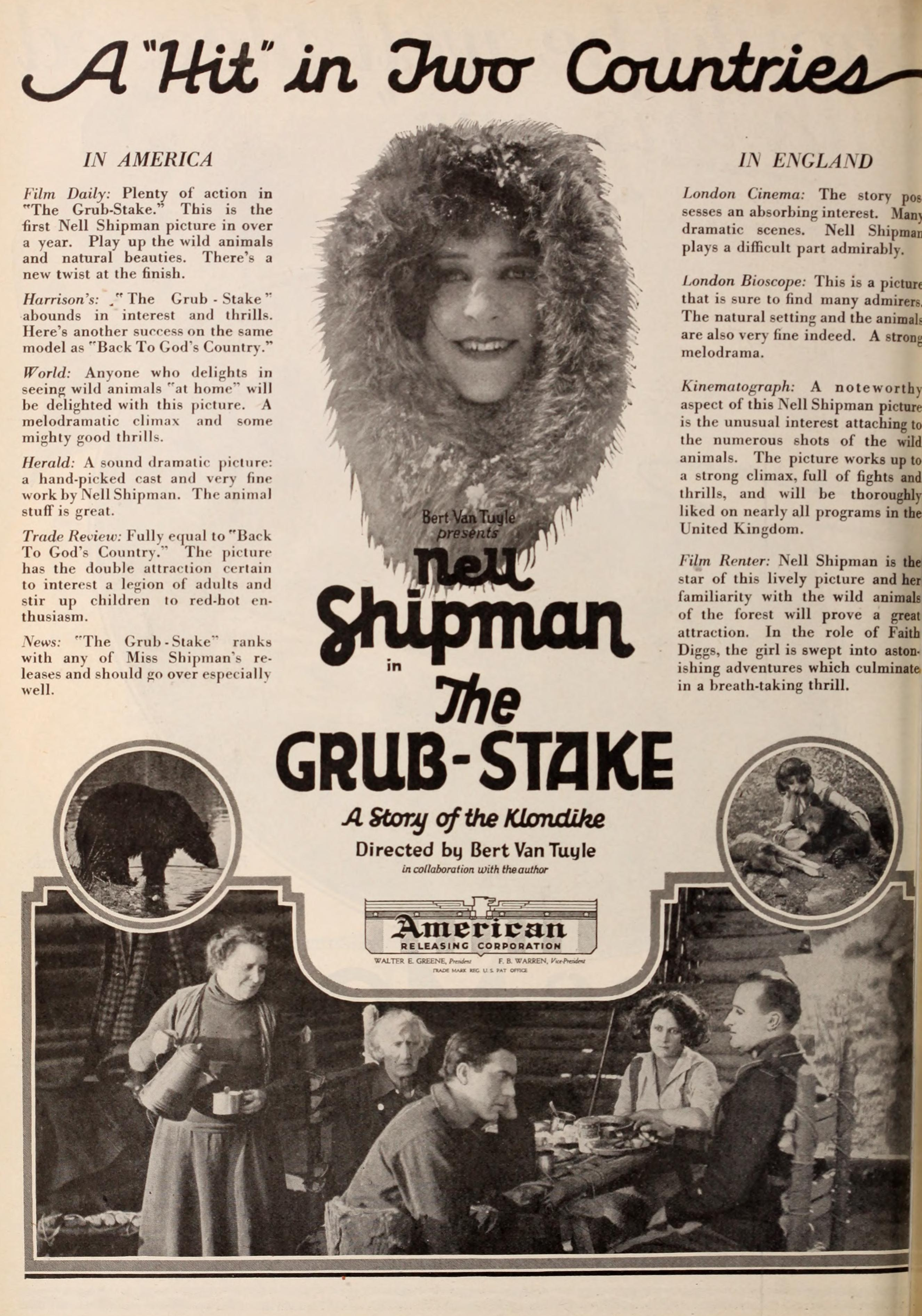
- Advertisement for the film
- Directed by: Bert Van Tuyle; Nell Shipman
- Written by: Nell Shipman
- Produced by: Nell Shipman; Bert Van Tuyle
- Starring: Nell Shipman; Alfred Allen; Walt Whitman; Lillian Leighton; George Berrell; Hugh Thompson
- Cinematography: Joseph Walker; Robert Newhard
- Edited by: Nell Shipman
- Production company: Nell Shipman Productions
- Distributed by: American Releasing Corporation; Aywon Film Corporation
- Release date: February 24, 1923
- Running time: 99 minutes
- Country: United States
- Languages: Silent; English intertitles
- Budget: $180,000

The Grub-Stake, also released as The Romance of Lost Valley and The Golden Yukon, is a 1923 American silent melodrama film co-directed by Bert Van Tuyle and Nell Shipman, who played the lead role. The screenplay was written by Shipman and produced by her company, Nell Shipman Productions. Faith Diggs, who struggles to afford medicine for her father, is lured to Alaska by Mark Leroy with the promise of employment and marriage, but Mark intends to force Faith into prostitution.

A total of $180,000 was raised from investors, and filming was done in Spokane and Ione, Washington, and Lake Pend Oreille and Priest Lake, Idaho, from March to August 1922. Shipman brought her large collection of animals with her for use in the film. The production suffered from financial difficulties and lawsuits for unpaid wages. A judge initially ordered for Shipman's animals to be auctioned off, but this was reversed and the animals were later acquired by the San Diego Zoo.

American Releasing Corporation acquired the distribution rights, but went bankrupt before earning revenue from the film. The only money Shipman earned from the film was for promoting it. Her company went bankrupt and she did not make another feature film. Trade magazines praised the cinematography and wilderness scenes. A surviving print of the film was discovered in the archives of the British Film Institute.

== Plot ==
The Grub-Stake (1923)

At the turn of the 20th century Mark Leroy is seeking to buy supplies for an artist in Alaska. Mark meets Faith Diggs while she is working as a model for artists. Faith is fired due to her robe falling off. Faith's elderly father Skipper suffers from rheumatism, but she is unable to buy him medicine. Faith sells her hair in order to afford medicine for her father.

Mark hires Faith as a model for his hair tonic, but she thinks he is unaware of her cutting her hair. Mark reveals that the job was a ruse and tells her stories about Alaska before handing her some gold. Faith asks Mark to grubstake a laundry for her in Alaska, but he declines and they fight. She tramps around, but is unable to find employment.

Wong, Mark's Chinese servant, delivers a fur coat to Faith. Mark accepts to fund Faith's laundry. While en route to Alaska by ship Mark asks Faith to marry him and she accepts, but agrees to keep it a secret. They continue to Dawson City with a sled dog team.

While Faith and Mark are at a dance Wong attempts to kill Skipper with a medicine overdose at Mark's orders. Malamute Mike, an unsuccessful prospector, talks about a large lost mine in a valley, but is the subject of mockery because he believes that his empty dog leash is attached to his dead dog Yukon. Dawson Kate, the mother of the artist Mark was buying materials for, reveals to Faith that Mark plans on making her a prostitute and is already married to a woman in the American South.

Mike saves Skipper from being killed by coming in and distracting him from his medicine. Faith and Skipper flee to the Klondike with Mike as their guide. However, they become stranded in the wilderness. Mike heads to a cabin to seek help. Faith is harassed by animals while collecting firewood and becomes lost. Mike arrives at the cabin, which is the home of Kate and her son Jeb. The three bring Skipper back to the cabin and Kate nurses him back to health.

Seeking shelter from a storm, Faith falls asleep next to a bear. The bear leads her to a lake to drink from and a berry patch to eat from. Faith lives with the bear and its cubs. Jeb comes across Faith while following bear tracks. Jeb finds a note in a tree with directions to the lost mine. He helps Faith to Mike's cabin as she sprained her ankle. At Mike's cabin they discover Yukon to be alive. Jeb returns to his mother and tells her that he found both Faith and the mine. A mountie comes to Kate's cabin and tells her that he is searching for Faith, Skipper, and Mike, as they were accused of stealing Mark's dogs. Kate sends him off in the wrong direction.

Mike heads off to Dawson to stake his claim to the land. Faith falls in love in Jeb, but Kate tells her that she cannot have him. Skipper plans on going to Dawson with Faith, but the mountie arrives stating that Kate did not fool him. The mountie does not immediately arrest them as Skipper is too sick to travel. The mountie reveals to Jeb that Kate works at the dance hall and not as Dawson's postmaster, but Faith lies to Jeb and tells him that she received mail from Kate.

At a bar Mike offers to pay for everybody's drinks, catching Mark's attention. A drunk Mike tells everybody about the mine before passing out. Mark threatens to have Yukon killed unless Mike tells him the location of the mine.

Mark shoots Mike in the back after they arrive at the mine and see the mountie and Faith. Mark's men take down the mountie while Faith runs away. Kate and Jeb shoot at Mark's men and kill Wong. Mark knocks Skipper out and a fight between Faith and Mark leads to a cliff. Mark falls to his death while Faith is rescued by Jeb and Mark's men. The next spring Jeb and Faith have a child.

== Cast ==
- Nell Shipman as Faith Diggs
- Alfred Allen as Mark Leroy
- Walt Whitman as Skipper Diggs
- Lillian Leighton as Dawson Kate
- George Berrell as Malamute Mike
- Hugh Thompson as Jeb
- C. K. Van Auker as Mountie
- Ah Wing as Wong
- Marjorie Warfield as art student
- Lloyd Peters as bartender

== Production ==
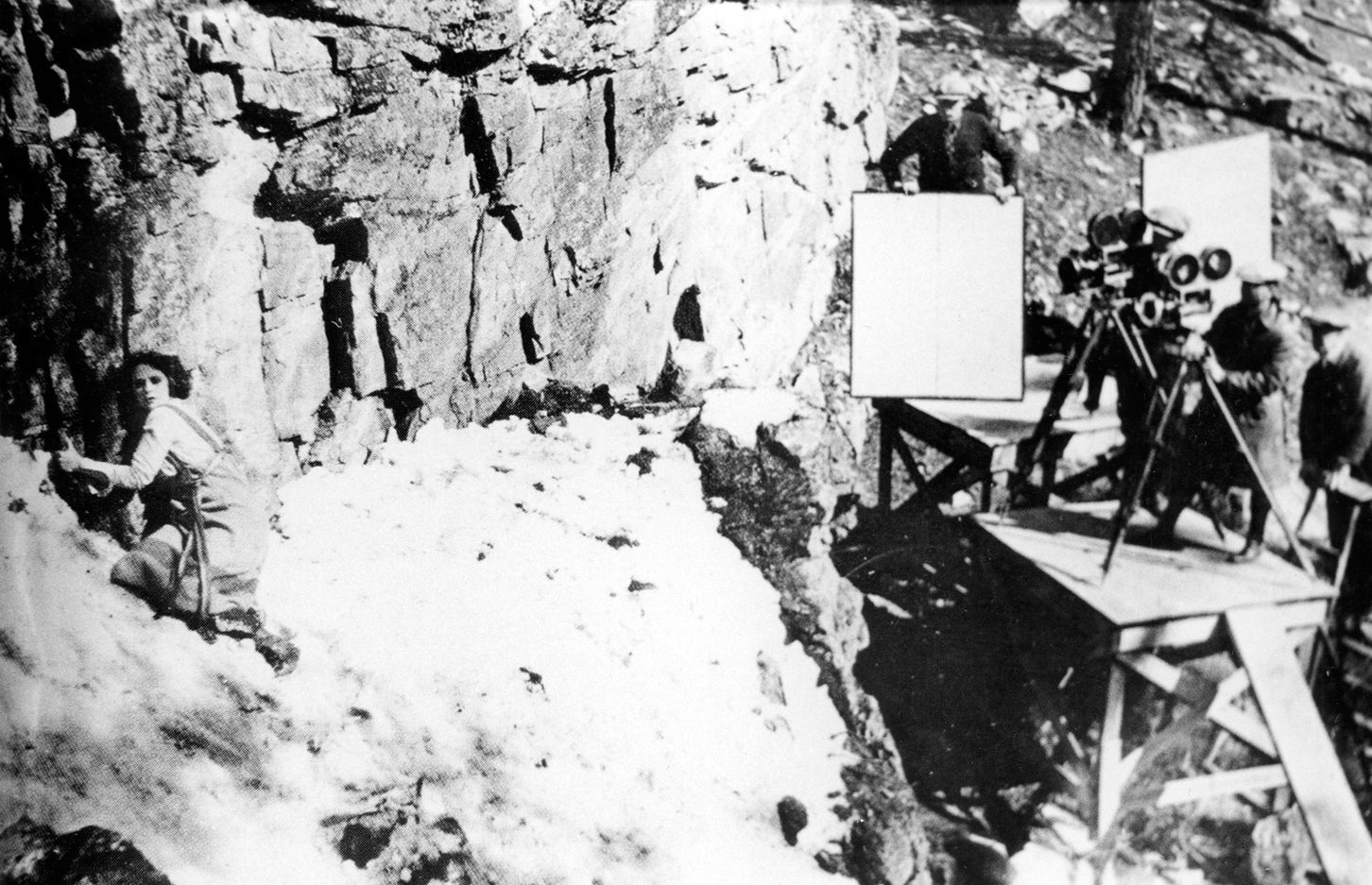
Nell Shipman hanging off of a cliff

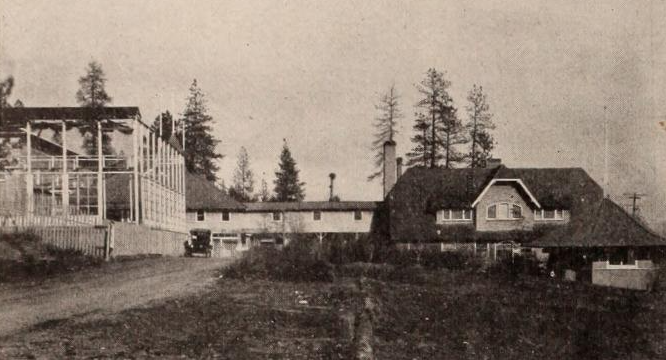
Minnehaha Studios

Nell Shipman Productions was formed in October 1920. Nell Shipman and Bert Van Tuyle's The Girl from God's Country was a financial failure and they had to sell car and house in Highland Park, Los Angeles. On February 8, 1922, she announced her next film would be made in Spokane, Washington, on a budget of at least $110,000. Fundraising from 300 people raised US$180,000 (equivalent to $3,462,000 in 2025) for The Grub-Stake.

Van Tuyle co-directed the film with Shipman, who also wrote and edited the film and played the lead role. Shipman stated that her script for the film was outdated for the time. Lillian Leighton and Walt Whitman, who starred in The Girl from God's Country, performed in The Grub-Stake.

Joseph Walker was the cinematographer, with Robert Newhard in charge of the second camera. Filming was initially done in Spokane, at Minnehaha Studios owned by Dorothy and Wellington Playter starting on March 7, 1922. The interior scenes set in Seattle and Dawson City were shot at Minnehaha Studios. The production crew arrived for filming in Ione, Washington, on March 9, and then filmed at the Lake Pend Oreille for ten days in March. The production ended in Priest Lake, Idaho, in August 1922.

A scene set in a dance-hall featured 300 extras on set. A storm scene in the film was shot night-for-night with two Klieg lights illuminating the area, two fire hoses used for rain, and an airplane engine for wind. The cliff-hanging scene was shot at Mount Lookout, the highest mountain in the area. No doubles were used for Shipman in the film.

The film used 22 Alaskan Malamute dogs. Shipman's zoo from Highland Park was moved to Seattle, where a $500 beaver pond was created at the studio, before being moved to Priest Lake, Idaho. Her animal collection included bears, wolves, dogs, bobcats, beavers, skunks, elk, deer, eagles, and one cougar. Brownie the Bear bit Van Tuyle's hand causing severed tendons and broken bones. The carpentry shop at the Seattle studio was used to create 200 transportation cages for the animals. The animal scenes took several weeks to film.

A total of 50,000 feet of film was shot, edited down to 11,000 feet across twelve film feels. Van Tuyle later reduced this to 10,000 feet and then to 8,000 feet. A final cut of the film was made with 7,000 feet across seven film reels. A laboratory on Sunset Boulevard agreed to wait for payment for its services in exchange for holding onto the negatives.

The cast sued Shipman for two weeks of back pay. They attempted to lien the negative and final print, but the laboratory denied that she was at the property and she would leave via the fire escape when necessary. Van Tuyle and Shipman pawned their furniture and family heirlooms in order to finance a sales trip to New York. A judge in Sandpoint, Idaho, ordered that her animals be auctioned on April 17, 1925, in order to pay $795 Shipman owed to Sam Byers, but Judge Charles Heitman cancelled the auction and returned the animals to her; the animals were later acquired by the San Diego Zoo. Nell Shipman Productions went bankrupt and this was the last feature film that Shipman made.

== Release ==
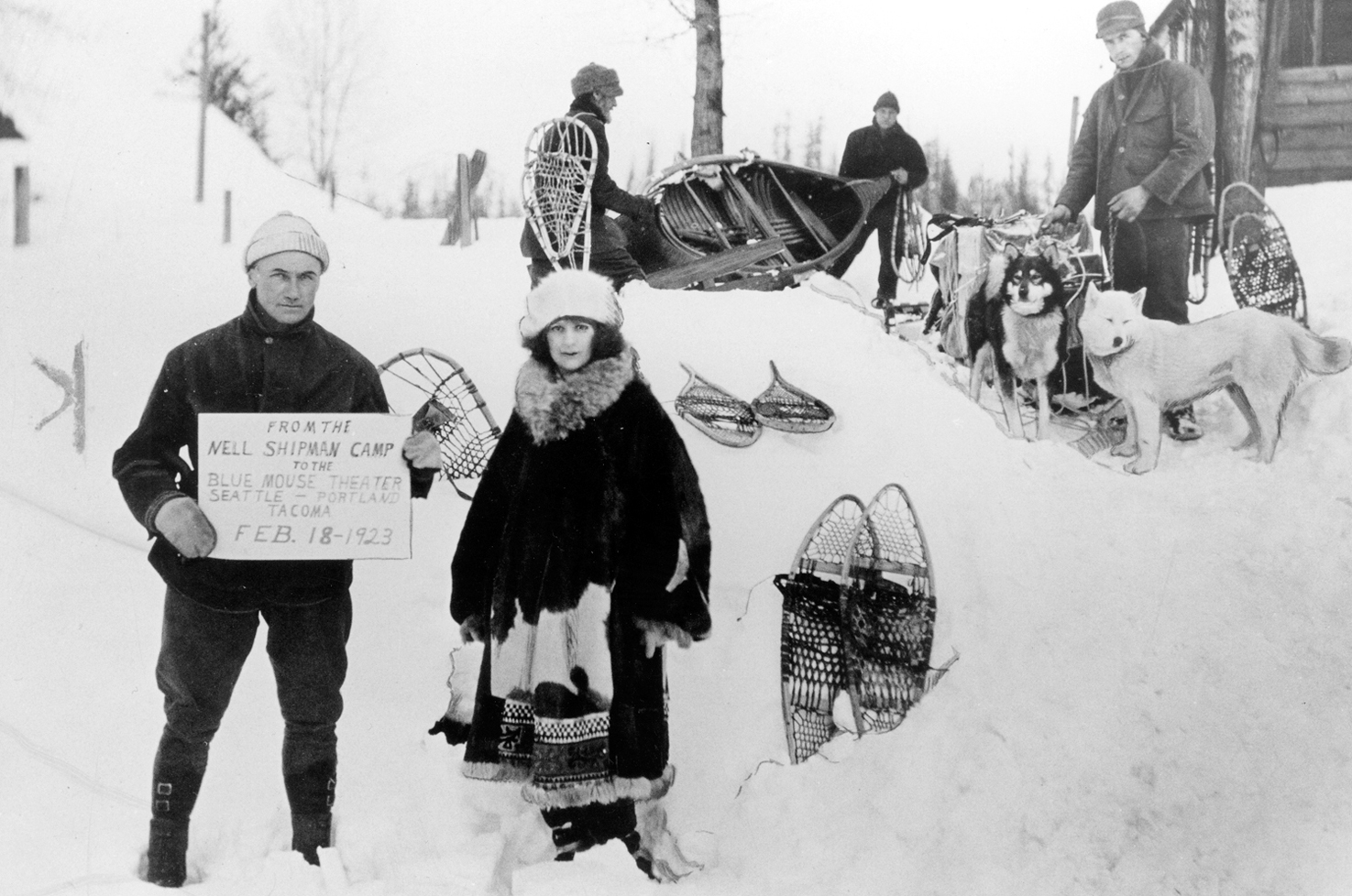
Nell Shipman during her promotional tour for The Grub-Stake

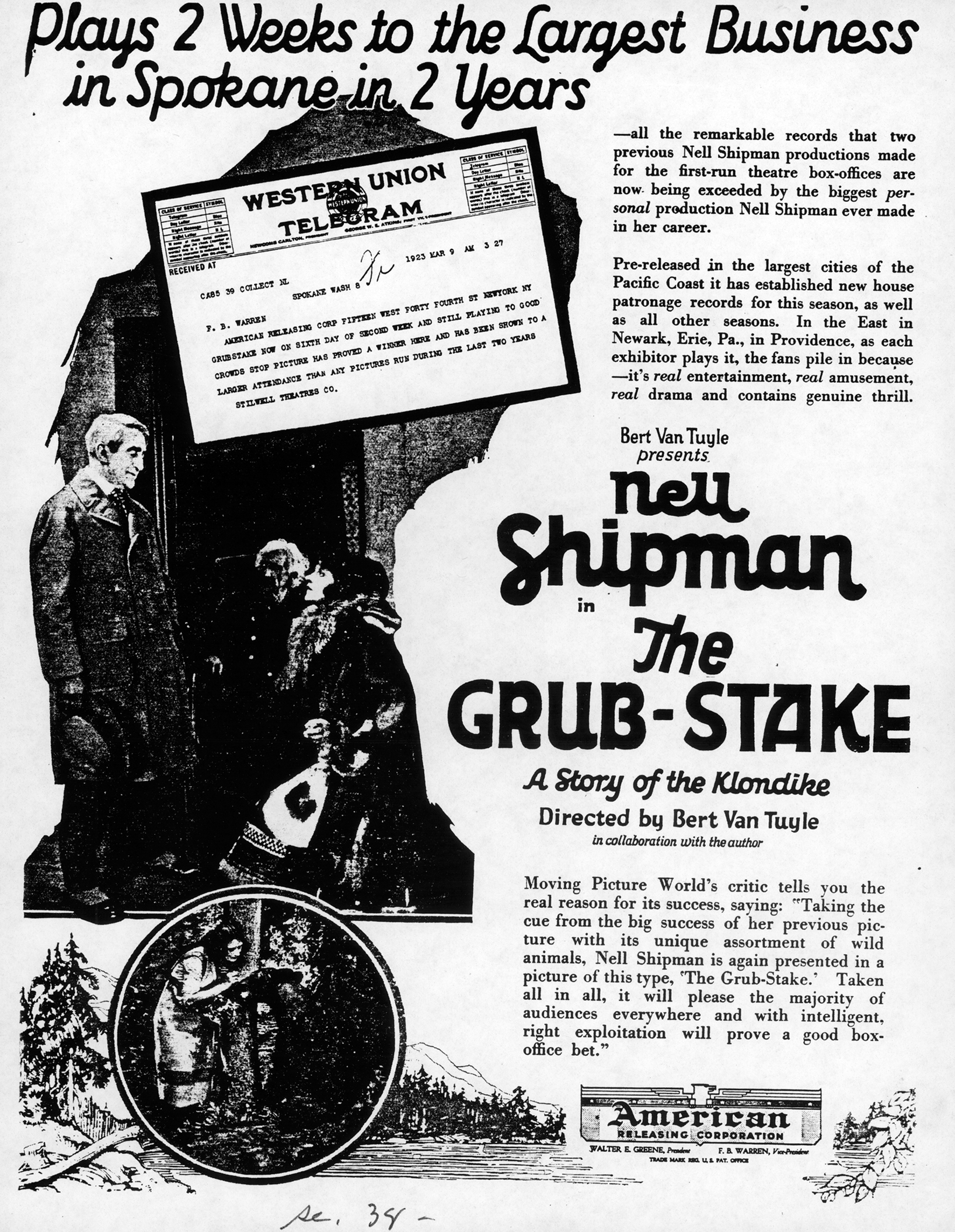
An advertisement for The Grub-Stake

A preview of the film was shown to distributors in November 1922. American Releasing Corporation acquired the distribution rights as Shipman believed that all of the other distributors hated the film as they left a showing without saying anything. She was not given an advance payment by American Release, compared to the $75,000 (equivalent to $1,417,000 in 2025) offered by Metro Pictures. Shipman was paid $4,500 for promoting the film in Portland, Seattle, and Tacoma; this was the only money she earned from the film.

A box office gross of $600,000 was predicted. It was meant to premiere at the Casino theater in Spokane on February 15, 1923, but bad weather delayed it to February 24. American Releasing went bankrupt before it received money earned from films released after February 1923.

The distribution rights for the United Kingdom were sold by American Releasing for $4,000 and it was released under the title The Romance of Lost Valley in 1923. Aywon Film Corporation released the film in the United States, without Shipman's knowledge, under the title The Golden Yukon in 1927, after editing it to be seven reels long.

== Reception ==
Exhibitors Trade Review praised the scenes of Faith wandering the wilderness and the climax of the film. The Film Daily's review praised the cinematography and Shipman's athletic ability, but criticized the lighting in some interior scenes. L. C. Moen, writing for Motion Picture News, criticized the opening of the film as uninteresting, but praised the storm and dance hall scenes.

Jules Caldeira, writing for Film Inquiry in 2023, praised the film's nature scenes and Shipman's onscreen appearance with multiple animals. He wrote that it was "a lesser-known gem of feminism both in front of and behind the camera". David Cairns wrote in 2017 that the film was suspenseful and exciting.

== Legacy ==
Tom Trusky discovered a surviving print of the film in the archives of the British Film Institute.

An edited version of the film, The Grub-Stake Revisited, set to a new score and narration from the works of William Shakespeare was created by the Yukon Film Society and Daniel Janke in 2012. This version was inspired by What's Up, Tiger Lily?. A version with an original score by Jane Gardner was shown at HippFest in 2016.

== Works cited ==
=== Books ===
- Armatage, Kay (2003). The Girl from God's Country: Nell Shipman and the Silent Cinema. University of Toronto Press. doi:10.3138/9781442681378. ISBN 9781442681378.
- Förster, Annette (2017). Women in the Silent Cinema: Histories of Fame and Fate. Amsterdam University Press. doi:10.2307/j.ctt1zqrmpg. ISBN 978-90-485-2451-8. JSTOR j.ctt1zqrmpg.

=== Magazines ===
- "The Grub Stake". Exhibitors Trade Review. Vol. 13, no. 19. Exhibitors Trade Review. 1923.
- "Wild Animals and Thrills In Northern Meller". The Film Daily. Vol. 23, no. 74. Wild's Films and Film Folk. 1923.
- Moen, L. (1923). "The Grub-Stake". Motion Picture News. Vol. 27, no. 9. Exhibitors' Time Inc.

=== News ===
- "The Silent Treatment: Rescuing Nell Shipman's forgotten Canadian classic The Grub Stake". National Post. April 30, 2013.
- Kershner, Jim (March 7, 2022). "100 years ago in Spokane: Dog team arrives for shooting of latest Nell Shipman picture". The Spokesman-Review. Archived from the original on March 9, 2022.
- Wade, Mike (December 15, 2016). "Forgotten pioneer of silent era honoured at cinema festival". The Times. Archived from the original on May 30, 2025.

=== Newspapers ===
- "Bring Dog Teams For Movies Here". Spokane Daily Chronicle. February 22, 1922. p. 6 – via Newspapers.com.
- "Climb Mountain In Stiff Blizzard". Spokane Daily Chronicle. March 20, 1922. p. 20 – via Newspapers.com.
- "Crowds Pack Theater To See "The Grubstake"". Spokane Daily Chronicle. February 24, 1923. p. 3 – via Newspapers.com.
- "Grub Stake Film Held Up By Storm". Spokane Daily Chronicle. February 15, 1923. p. 1 – via Newspapers.com.
- "Halt Nell Shipman Sale". The Spokesman-Review. May 6, 1925. p. 10 – via Newspapers.com.
- "Ione Turns Out For Movie Folk". Spokane Daily Chronicle. March 10, 1922. p. 3 – via Newspapers.com.
- "Nell Shipman Film Completed, "Grub Stake" Released Soon". Spokane Daily Chronicle. August 28, 1922. p. 3 – via Newspapers.com.
- "Nell Shipman's Mice, Skunks, Deer and Dogs Will Be Sold". Spokane Daily Chronicle. April 9, 1925. p. 1 – via Newspapers.com.
- "Nell Shipman Zoo Gets Home". The Spokane Press. June 10, 1925. p. 2 – via Newspapers.com.
- "No Doubles for Nell Shipman in 'The Grub Stake'". Minnesota Star Tribune. April 14, 1923. p. 9 – via Newspapers.com.
- "Report Spokane Film Marketed". The Spokesman-Review. December 18, 1922. p. 6 – via Newspapers.com.
- "Shipman Film To Be Released". Spokane Daily Chronicle. November 8, 1922. p. 12 – via Newspapers.com.
- ""Tame" Bear Bites Fingers". Spokane Daily Chronicle. May 11, 1922. p. 1 – via Newspapers.com.
- "The Grubstake To Open Saturday". Spokane Daily Chronicle. February 14, 1923. p. 13 – via Newspapers.com.
- "Will Film First Scenes Of "Grub Stake" Tuesday". Spokane Daily Chronicle. March 6, 1922. p. 5 – via Newspapers.com.
- Webster, Dan (June 13, 2002). "Striking it rich with 'Fool's Gold'". The Spokesman-Review. p. D3 – via Newspapers.com.

=== Web ===
- "Nell Shipman Papers, 1912–1970". Orbis Cascade Alliance. Archived from the original on May 30, 2025.
- "The Grub-Stake". American Film Institute. Archived from the original on May 30, 2025.
- Cairns, David (March 30, 2017). "The Forgotten: Nell Shipman & Bert Van Tuyle's "The Grub-Stake" (1923)". Mubi. Archived from the original on February 1, 2025.
- Caldeira, Jules (November 30, 2023). "A Century in Cinema: The Grub Stake (1923)". Film Inquiry. Archived from the original on May 30, 2025.
