= Sinner or Saint (film) =

1923 silent film

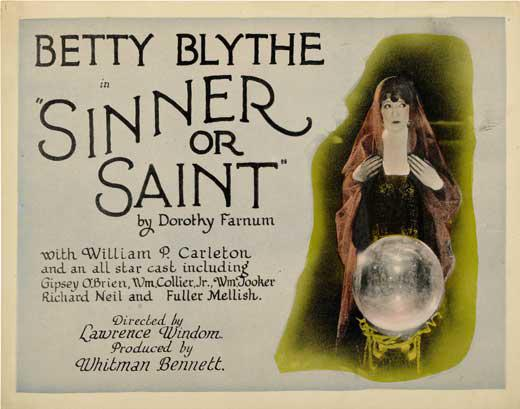
- Directed by: Lawrence C. Windom
- Written by: Dorothy Farnum
- Starring: Betty Blythe; William P. Carleton; Gypsy O'Brien
- Cinematography: Edward Paul
- Production company: Betty Blythe Productions
- Distributed by: Selznick Pictures
- Release date: July 2, 1923
- Running time: 60 minutes
- Country: United States
- Languages: Silent; English intertitles

Sinner or Saint is a 1923 American silent drama film directed by Lawrence C. Windom and starring Betty Blythe, William P. Carleton and Gypsy O'Brien.

== Cast ==
- Betty Blythe as Mademoiselle Iris
- William P. Carleton as Paul Reynolds
- Gypsy O'Brien as Marguerite Roberts
- William H. Tooker as Stephen Roberts
- Fuller Mellish as Elijah Homes
- Richard Neill as Charles Carter
- William Collier Jr. as Young Artist

== Preservation ==
- This is now a lost film as no prints survive.

== Bibliography ==
- Robert B. Connelly. The Silents: Silent Feature Films, 1910-36, Volume 40, Issue 2. December Press, 1998.
