= Shadows (1919 film) =

1919 film by Reginald Barker

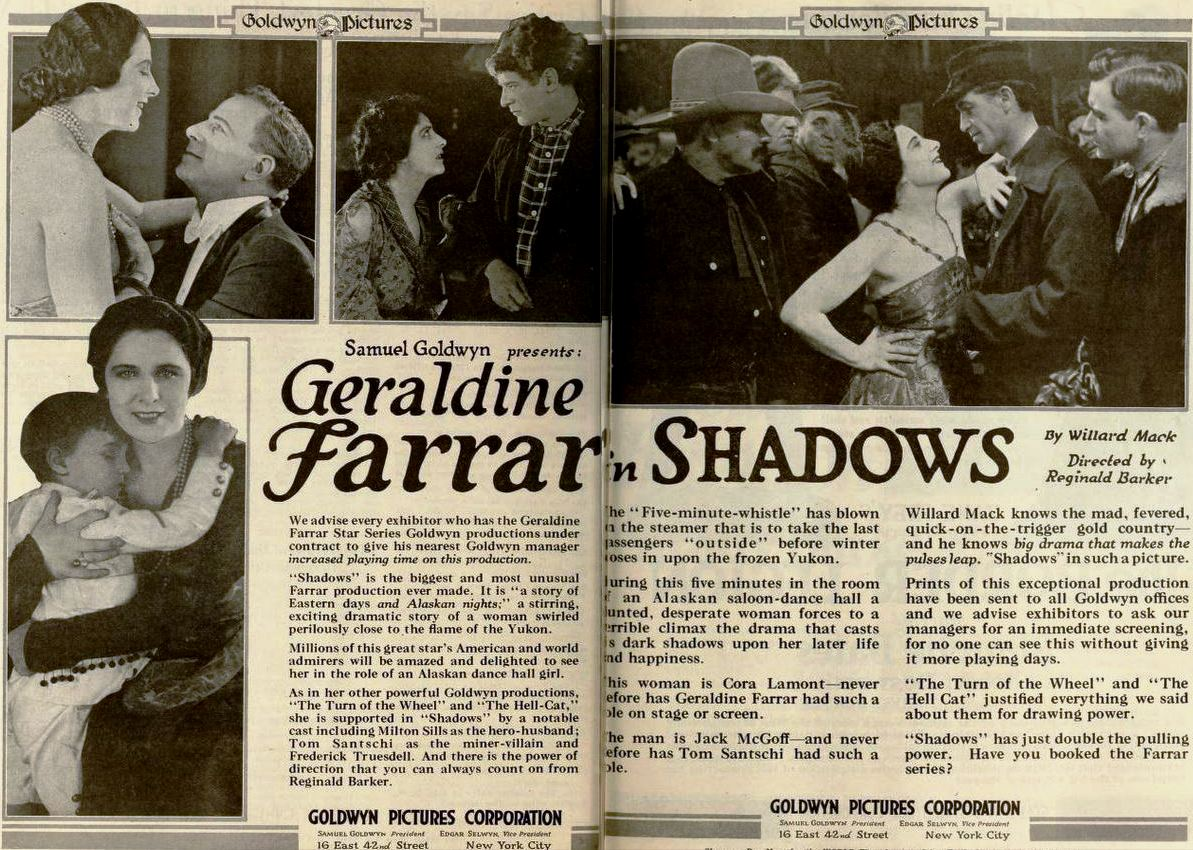
- Advertisement
- Directed by: Reginald Barker
- Written by: Willard Mack (story & screenplay); J. G. Hawkes
- Produced by: Samuel Goldwyn
- Starring: Geraldine Farrar
- Cinematography: Percy Hilburn (French)
- Distributed by: Goldwyn Pictures
- Release date: February 9, 1919
- Running time: 50 minutes; 5 reels
- Country: United States
- Language: Silent (English intertitles)

Shadows is a 1919 American silent film drama produced by Samuel Goldwyn and directed by Reginald Barker. It stars opera singer Geraldine Farrar.

This is a lost film except for a one-reel fragment at the Library of Congress.

== Plot ==
As described in a film magazine, Muriel Barnes is the loving and happy wife of conservative New Yorker Judson Barnes and the devoted mother of a child, when a promoter of a fake mining enterprise, Frank Craftley, gains social access to her home. Craftley has never met her before, but his side partner Jack McGoff has a photograph of Muriel from her previous life in Alaska under the name Cora Lamont. McGoff had deceived her by marrying her although he already had a living wife. He then forced her into the job as a dance hall girl. She escaped by shooting him in self-defense and then fleeing Alaska. Without knowing these details but guessing some general circumstances, Craftley works on her fears until she induces her husband to go out West to inspect the salted claim. McGoff stays behind and visits Muriel's home at night, and she permits him to enter her boudoir. Knowing that a policeman is courting one of the servants on the floor below, she scatters some jewels to give the appearance of a robbery, and, when McGoff attempts to embrace her, screams for help. Fleeing arrest, McGoff shoots at the policeman, and is later killed in the resulting scrimmage. His death ends the shadows in Muriel's life.

== Cast ==
- Geraldine Farrar - Muriel Barnes / Cora Lamont
- Milton Sills - Judson Barnes
- Tom Santschi - Jack McGoff
- Frederick Truesdell - Frank Craftley
- George Smith - The Child
- Charles Slattery - unknown role
- Robert Harvey - unknown role
- Jean Armour - unknown role
