= Modern Marriage =

1923 film by Victor Heerman and Lawrence C. Windom

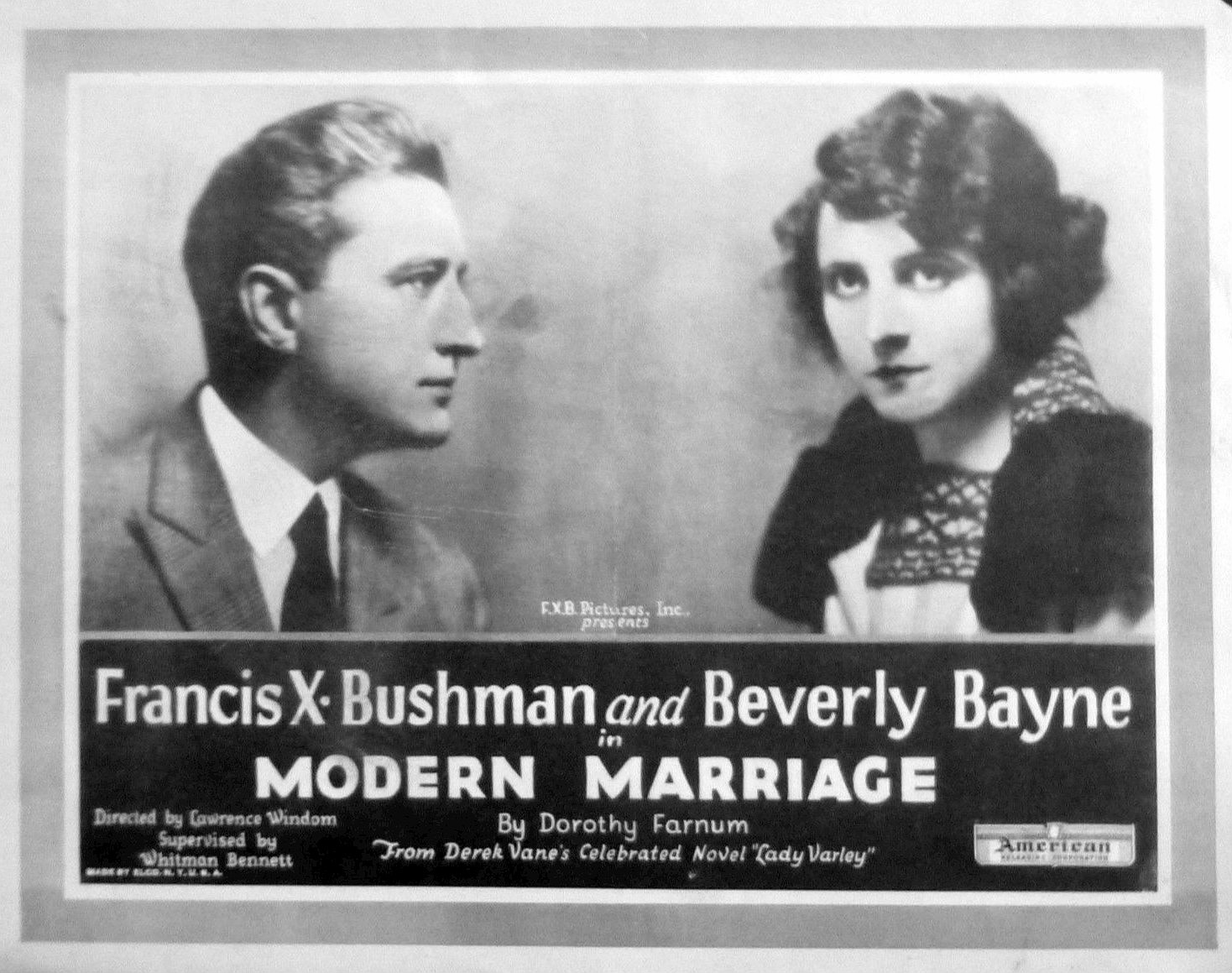
- Lobby card
- Directed by: Lawrence C. Windom; Victor Heerman
- Written by: Dorothy Farnum (scenario)
- Based on: Lady Varley by Derek Vane
- Produced by: Whitman Bennett; Francis X. Bushman
- Starring: Francis X. Bushman; Beverly Bayne
- Cinematography: Edward Paul
- Distributed by: American Releasing Corporation
- Release date: April 7, 1923
- Running time: 7 reels
- Country: United States
- Language: Silent (English intertitles)

Modern Marriage is a 1923 American silent crime drama film directed by Lawrence C. Windom and Victor Heerman. It starred Francis X. Bushman and Beverly Bayne in one of their last appearances together.

== Cast ==
- Francis X. Bushman as Hugh Varley
- Beverly Bayne as Denise Varley
- Roland Bottomley as Frank Despard
- Ernest Hilliard as Cort Maitland
- Zita Moulton as Nita Blake
- Frank Evans as Hugh Jr. (credited as Frankie Evans)
- Arnold Lucy as Elihu Simpson
- Pauline Dempsey as Mammy
- Blanche Craig as Blossom Young

== Preservation status ==
A print of Modern Marriage is preserved at the British Film Institute National Film and Television Archive in London.
