= The Tie That Binds (1923 film) =

1923 film

- Directed by: Joseph Levering
- Written by: Pearl Keating (adaptation)
- Based on: The Tie That Binds by Peter B. Kyne
- Produced by: Jacob Wilk
- Starring: Walter Miller; Barbara Bedford; Raymond Hatton; William P. Carleton; Robert Edeson
- Cinematography: George Robinson
- Production company: Jacob Wilk Productions
- Distributed by: Warner Bros.
- Release date: March 15, 1923
- Running time: 70 minutes
- Country: United States
- Languages: Silent film (English intertitles)

The Tie That Binds is a lost 1923 American silent drama film directed by Joseph Levering and starring Walter Miller, Barbara Bedford, Raymond Hatton, William P. Carleton, and Robert Edeson. It is based on a novel of the same name by Frank R. Adams. The film was released by Warner Bros. on March 15, 1923.

== Cast ==
- Walter Miller as David Winthrop
- Barbara Bedford as Mary Ellen Gray
- Raymond Hatton as Hiram Foster
- William P. Carleton as Daniel Kenyon
- Robert Edeson as Charles Dodge
- Julia Swayne Gordon as Leila Brant
- Marian Swayne as Flora Foster
- Effie Shannon as Mrs. Mills

== Preservation ==
With no holdings located in archives, The Tie That Binds is considered a lost film.
