= It Happened in Hollywood =

1937 film by Harry Lachman

- Directed by: Harry Lachman
- Written by: Ethel Hill; Harvey Fergusson; Samuel Fuller; Myles Connolly
- Produced by: Myles Connolly; William Perlberg
- Starring: Richard Dix; Fay Wray; Victor Kilian
- Cinematography: Joseph Walker
- Edited by: Al Clark; Otto Meyer
- Music by: Morris Stoloff
- Production company: Columbia Pictures
- Distributed by: Columbia Pictures
- Release date: September 7, 1937
- Running time: 67 minutes
- Country: United States
- Language: English

It Happened in Hollywood is a 1937 American comedy film directed by Harry Lachman and starring Richard Dix, Fay Wray and Victor Kilian. The arrival of sound wrecks the career of a leading western actor while his leading lady rises to new heights. Its original working title was Once a Hero.

== Plot ==
Tim Bart ( Dix) is a Hollywood cowboy hero of the silent films, with his co-star and girlfriend Gloria Gay ( Wray ). During a publicity trip, he ends up at a children's hospital where he meets Billy, a young fan about to have surgery. He promises Billy that Billy can come out to Hollywood to visit once he gets well.

During this time, talking movies start being made, and many silent stars do not make it in talkies. Gloria becomes a star, while Tim, because of his drawl, and the lack of western films being made, becomes a has-been. A director friend of Tim's tries to put him in a gangster film, but once a scene requires him to kill a policeman, he walks out.

Shortly after, a youngster, Billy, tracks Tim down, and collapses on his doorstep. Billy reminds Tim of his promise of a visit. Tim decides to throw a huge party for Billy at his ranch (which is in foreclosure) and with the help of a neighbour, rounds up the best impersonators they can find. During the party, a bank officer shows up, determined to kick everyone out, and Gloria herself shows up. While Tim's friends take care of hogtying the bank officer, Gloria confesses that she misses Tim, and has not had an acting job in months.

Tim becomes upset, and thinks about the gangster film, and figures he might just be able to Rob a bank for real. At the bank, no sooner does Tim get to the manager, than a real gang of robbers shows up, and the leader shoots a cop while trying to leave. Tim, being a crack shot, shoots the robber and some of his accomplices, and becomes a hero.

Because of the publicity of Tim's actions the studio rehires Tim to do talkie westerns. Tim is given his only request, that Gloria be his co-star. Tim rebuys his ranch, and turns it into a boy's camp, with Gloria and young Billy by his side.

== Cast ==
- Richard Dix as Tim Bart
- Fay Wray as Gloria Gay
- Victor Kilian as Slim
- Charles Arnt as Jed Reed
- Granville Bates as Sam Bennett
- William B. Davidson as Al Howard
- Arthur Loft as Pete
- Edgar Dearing as Joe Stevens
- James Donlan as Shorty
- Bill Burrud as Billy - The Kid
- Franklin Pangborn as Mr. Forsythe
- Zeffie Tilbury as Miss Gordon
- Harold Goodwin as Buck
- Charles Brinley as Pappy
- Scotty Beckett as Boy (uncredited)
- Byron Foulger as Chet (uncredited)
- Edward LeSaint as Doctor (uncredited)
- Sam McDaniel as Porter (uncredited)
- Zita Moulton as Englishwoman

== Bibliography ==
- E.J. Stephens & Marc Wanamaker. Early Poverty Row Studios. Arcadia Publishing, 2014.
