= The Riddle: Woman =

1920 film

The Riddle:Woman
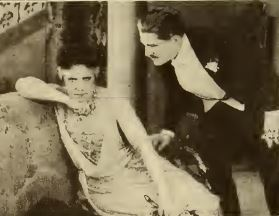
- Still with Geraldine Farrar and William P. Carleton
- Directed by: Edward José
- Written by: Charlotte E. Wells and Dorothy Donnelly (adaptation of play); John B. Clymer (scenario for film)
- Based on: a Danish play by Carl Jacobi
- Starring: Geraldine Farrar
- Cinematography: Max Scheider; Stewart B. Moss (special effects)
- Production company: Associated Exhibitors
- Distributed by: Pathé Exchange
- Release date: October 3, 1920
- Running time: 60 minutes
- Country: United States
- Language: Silent (English intertitles)

The Riddle: Woman is a 1920 American silent drama film directed by Edward José, distributed by Pathé Exchange, and starring opera singer Geraldine Farrar in her last film. This film was also the film debut of Madge Bellamy.

== Plot ==
As described in a film magazine, Lilla Gravert falls under the spell of the Eric Helsingor, a captain of chance, only to be deceived by the rogue. She attempts suicide but is saved by Larz Olrik who, by the customs of his country, is engaged to Kristine. Larz induces Lilla to accept the invitation of Isaac Meyer, a friend of Lilla's late father, to come to America. There she and Larz are married. Larz is trustee of Kristine's estate and finds that much of her money is disappearing. Kristine has also become a victim of Helsingor's and is being blackmailed. Helsingor turns his attention to Marie Meyer, Isaac's motherless daughter, for his usual sinister purposes. Lilla insists that he must not carry out his plans. He offers to give her incriminating letters if she will not stand in his way. Lilla turns on him and is so glorious in her rage that Helsingor tells her that it is she that he wants. She is struggling with him when Kristine kills Helsingor and then commits suicide, removing Lilla and Marie's menace.

== Cast ==
- Geraldine Farrar as Lilla Gravert
- Montagu Love as Larz Olrik
- Adele Blood as Kristine
- William P. Carleton as Eric Helsingor
- Frank Losee as Sigurd Gravert
- Madge Bellamy as Marie Meyer
- Louis Stern as Isaac Meyer
- Philippe De Lacy

== Production ==
The production was filmed on location at Marblehead, Massachusetts and at the former Thanhouser Company studio in New Rochelle, New York.

== Preservation status ==
It is not known whether the film currently survives.
