= The Danger Point =

1922 film

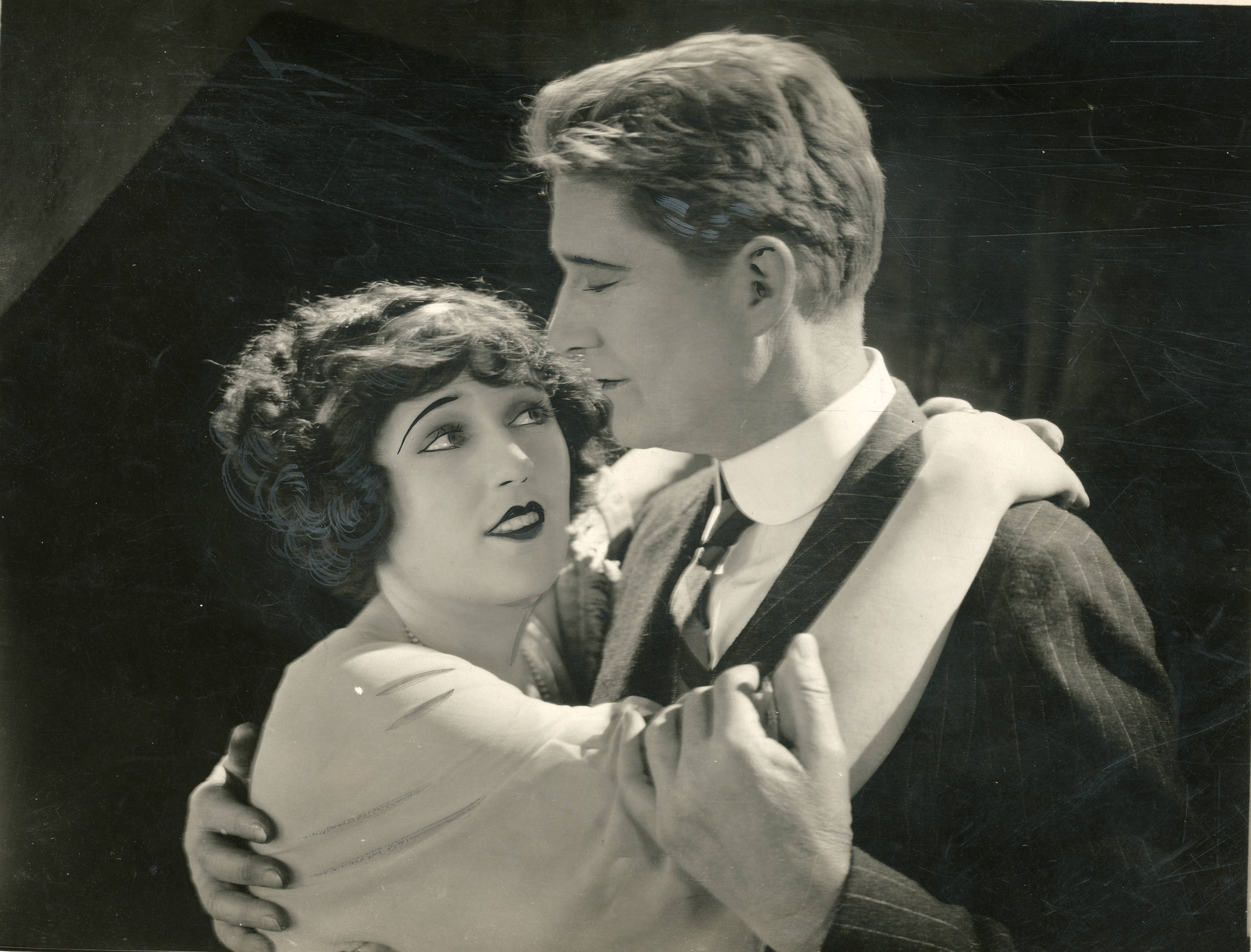
- Directed by: Lloyd Ingraham
- Written by: Victor Halperin; Adelaide Heilbron
- Produced by: Victor Halperin
- Starring: Carmel Myers; William P. Carleton; Vernon Steele
- Cinematography: Ross Fisher
- Production company: Victor Halperin Productions
- Distributed by: American Releasing Corporation
- Release date: December 24, 1922
- Running time: 60 minutes
- Country: United States
- Languages: Silent; English intertitles

The Danger Point is a lost 1922 American silent drama film directed by Lloyd Ingraham and starring Carmel Myers, William P. Carleton and Vernon Steele.

== Cast ==
- Carmel Myers as Alice Torrance
- William P. Carleton as James Benton
- Vernon Steele as Duncan Phelps
- Joseph J. Dowling as Banjamin
- Harry Todd as Sam Biggs
- Margaret Joslin as Elvira Hubbard

== Preservation ==
With no holdings located in archives, The Danger Point is considered a lost film.

== Bibliography ==
- Connelly, Robert B. The Silents: Silent Feature Films, 1910-36, Volume 40, Issue 2. December Press, 1998.
- Munden, Kenneth White. The American Film Institute Catalog of Motion Pictures Produced in the United States, Part 1. University of California Press, 1997.
