= Toby Claude =

Irish actress and singer

- Claude c.1904
- Born: Harriette Mary Kavanagh; January 29, 1877; Dublin, Ireland
- Died: October 27, 1962 (aged 85); Los Angeles, California, U.S.
- Occupation: Actress
- Years active: 1900–1929
- Spouse: William P. Carleton (divorced 1903)

Toby Claude (born Harriette Mary Kavanagh; January 29, 1877 – October 27, 1962) was an Irish actress and singer in vaudeville, on the Broadway stage, and in silent films.

== Early life ==
Harriette Mary Kavanagh was born in Dublin. Her father Richard Kavanaugh was Irish; her mother Angelina Claude was an "English burlesque actress". She began using the name "Toby" as a girl, after a dog on the cover of Punch magazine.

== Career ==
Toby Claude in costume, 1904

Toby Claude's stage credits included roles in The Belle of New York (1900), The Cadet Girl (1900), The Prima Donna (1901), Floradora (1902), The Belle of Broadway (1902), The Baroness Fiddlesticks (1904). and Fantana (1906). Theatre writers often mentioned her short stature (she was well under five feet in height): "Miss Toby Claude [is] almost sufficiently diminutive to rank as an eccentric Lilliputian," commented one in 1904. Her vaudeville act included popular songs. She toured Hawaii and Australia in 1910.

During World War I she helped with military recruitment drives. In middle age, Toby Claude appeared in five silent films: Lost: A Wife (1925, now lost), The Clinging Vine (1926), For Alimony Only (1926), No Control (1927), and Turkish Delight (1927). In 1929 she was part of a group of actors who organized the Actors Theater in Los Angeles.

== Personal life ==
Toby Claude married fellow actor William P. Carleton; they divorced in 1903. In 1915 she was involved in a scandal when she was found leaving America with another actress's husband and young child. She died on October 27, 1962, in Los Angeles, California, USA.
