= Wanted: A Husband =

1919 comedy silent film directed by Lawrence Clement Windom

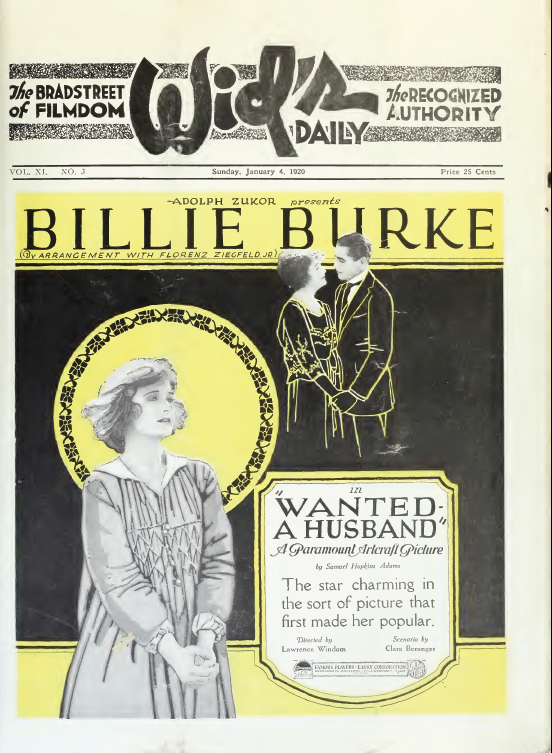
- Advertisement for the film
- Directed by: Lawrence C. Windom
- Written by: Clara Beranger (scenario)
- Based on: "Enter D'Arcy" by Samuel Hopkins Adams
- Produced by: Adolph Zukor; Jesse Lasky
- Starring: Billie Burke
- Cinematography: Roy Overbaugh
- Distributed by: Paramount-Artcraft Pictures
- Release date: December 28, 1919
- Running time: 5 reels; 4,596 feet
- Country: United States
- Languages: Silent; English intertitles

Wanted: A Husband is a 1919 American silent comedy film starring Billie Burke. It was produced by Famous Players–Lasky and distributed by Paramount-Artcraft. The film is based on the short story "Enter D'Arcy" by Samuel Hopkins Adams. The relatively unknown Lawrence C. Windom directed this lost film.

== Plot ==
As described in a film magazine, Amanda "Darcy" Cole is a normal young woman with a pleasing personality who, strangely enough, has no suitors. Her friends announce their engagements from time to time and each announcement giving her added cause for alarm. Gloria Green, an ardent physical culturist, tells Darcy where she is lax and she immediately begins training to improve her appearance. In the meantime she feigns an engagement with an unidentified Englishman. Her friends are invited to the country home of Tom Harmon to spend their honeymoons. To the surprise of all, Darcy shows up with her Englishman, who in time is identified as the very American cousin of one of her friends. This leads to a happy ending.

== Cast ==
- Billie Burke as Amanda Darcy Cole
- James Crane as Jack Remsen
- Margaret Linden as Gloria Green
- Charles Lane as Tom Harmon
- Edward Lester as Paul Wood
- Bradley Barker as Holcomb Lee
- Helen Greene as Maude Raynes
- Gypsy O'Brien as Helen Bartlett
- Kid Broad as Andy Dunn
- Mrs. Priestly Morrison as Veronica (aka Mary Florence Horne)
- Frank Goldsmith as Hiram

== Preservation ==
With no prints of Wanted: A Husband located in any film archives, it is considered a lost film.
