= Frances Moffett =

Frances Moffett (1900–1984) was an Irish teacher and writer.

Moffett was born on Dunlo Street, Ballinasloe, one of five children born to a Ms. Dodd and Doctor Moffett, a veterinarian. Her autobiography, I Also Am of Ireland, was an account of the first twenty-four years of her life, which were spent almost entirely in County Galway. It contains vivid accounts of the effects of World War One, the Irish War of Independence, and the Irish Civil War on her family, friends and neighbours.

In 1924 she became ill with tuberculosis and had to travel to England to obtain medical treatment. She never returned to Ireland. In the 1930s she became a teacher, later becoming Vice-Principal of a Women's Theological College, from which she retired in 1960 and returned to teaching in schools and a College of Education. She wrote her memoirs of her life up to 1924 at the age of 84. It was published in 1985 and was serialised on BBC Radio 4's Woman's Hour.

== Bibliography ==
- Moffett, Frances (1985). I Also Am of Ireland. British Broadcasting Corporation. ISBN 978-0-563-20388-9.
