= Lawrence C. Windom =

American film director

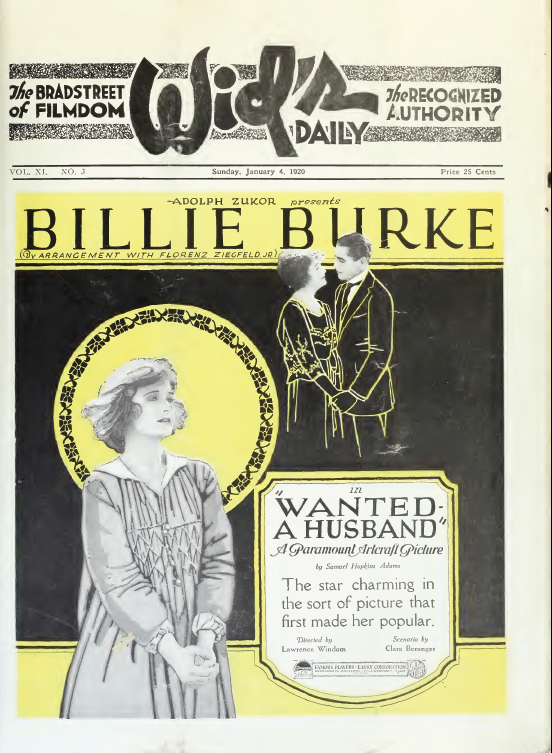
- Poster of the film Wanted: A Husband directed by Lawrence Windom
- Born: Lawrence Clement Toole; October 5, 1872; Lancaster, Ohio
- Died: November 14, 1957 (aged 85); Columbus, Ohio
- Occupation: Director
- Years active: 1915–1931

Lawrence Clement Windom (October 5, 1872 – November 14, 1957) was an American film director. He worked in theater before joining the film industry. In 1918 he signed a deal with World Pictures.

== Filmography ==
- 1915: Blind Justice
- 1915: Brought Home
- 1915: On the Little Mill Trace
- 1915: The Destroyer
- 1915: The Great Deceit
- 1915: The Papered Door
- 1915: The Spider
- 1916: A Little Volunteer
- 1916: A Tale From the Decameron
- 1916: Borrowed Sunshine
- 1916: Easy Ed
- 1916: Her Naked Soul
- 1916: In a Looking Glass
- 1916: Lost, Twenty-Four Hours
- 1916: Peter, the Hermit
- 1916: The Border Line
- 1916: The Discard
- 1916: The Promise Land
- 1916: The Way of Patience
- 1917: A Four Cent Courtship
- 1917: A Place in the Sun
- 1917: Efficiency Edgar's Courtship
- 1917: Fools for Luck
- 1917: Steps to Somewhere
- 1917: Sundaying in Fairview
- 1917: The Bridge of Fancy
- 1917: The Clock Struck One
- 1917: The Finish
- 1917: The Five Dollar Bill
- 1917: The Guiding Hand
- 1917: The Hoodooed Story
- 1917: The Kingdom of Hope
- 1917: The Season of Childhood
- 1917: The Small Town Guy
- 1917: The Uneven Road
- 1917: The Wonderful Event
- 1917: Two-Bit Seats
- 1917: What Would You Do?
- 1917: When Sorrow Weeps
- 1917: Would You Believe it?
- 1918: A Pair of Sixes
- 1918: Ruggles of Red Gap
- 1918: The Appearance of Evil
- 1918: The Grey Parasol
- 1918: The Power and the Glory
- 1918: Uneasy Money
- 1919: It's a Bear
- 1919: Taxi
- 1919: Upside Down
- 1919: Wanted: A Husband
- 1920: Headin' Home
- 1920: Human Collateral
- 1920: Nothing But Lies
- 1920: The Girl with the Jazz Heart
- 1920: The Truth
- 1920: The Very Idea
- 1922: Solomon in Society
- 1923: Modern Marriage
- 1923: Sinner or Saint
- 1923: The Truth About Wives
- 1927: Should a Mason Tell?
- 1927: Their Second Honeymoon
- 1928: Faithless Lover
- 1931: Enemies of the Law
