= Geraldine Farrar =

American opera singer and actress (1882–1967)

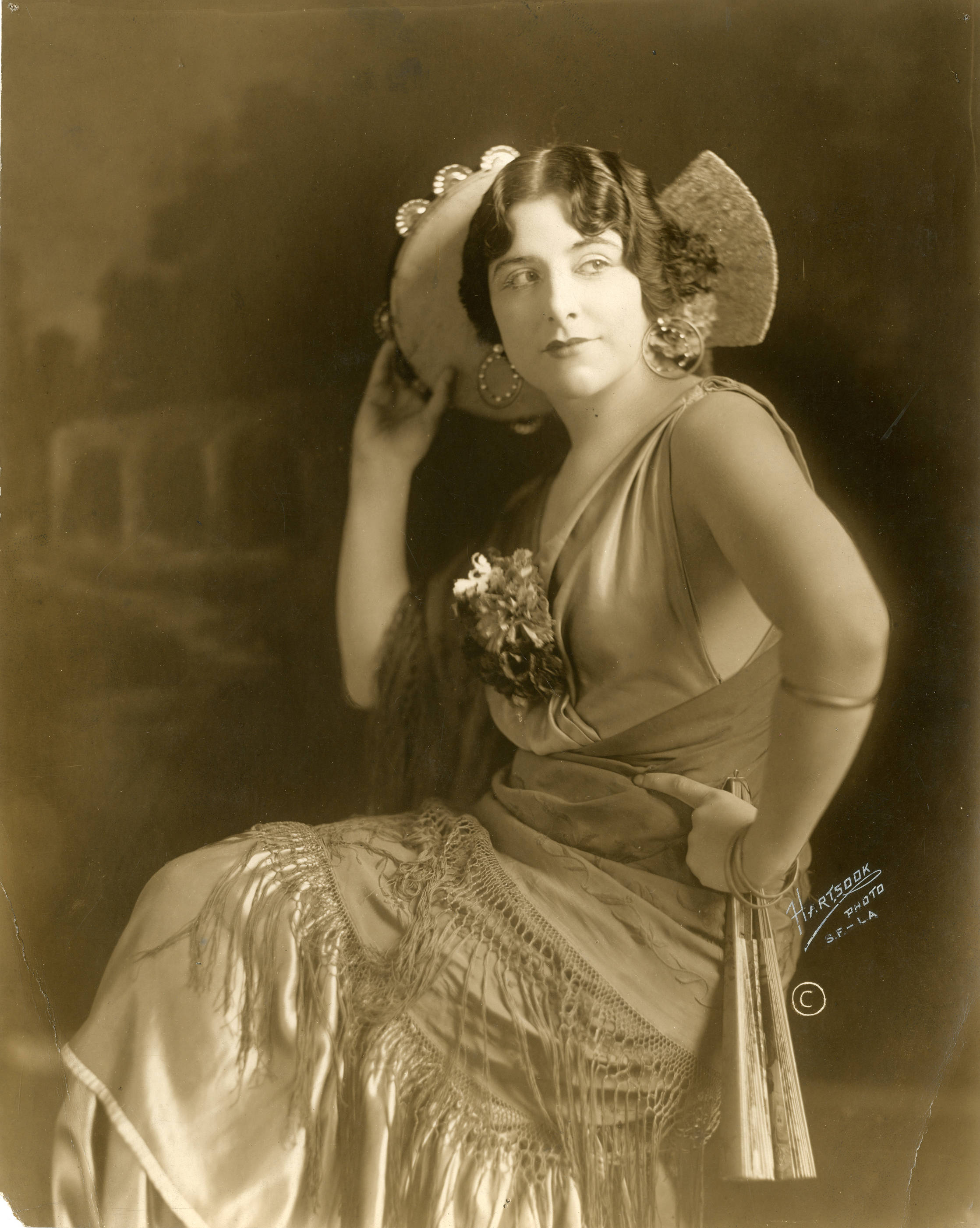
- Farrar in the title role of Carmen
- Born: Alice Geraldine Farrar; February 28, 1882; Melrose, Massachusetts, U.S.
- Died: March 11, 1967 (aged 85); Ridgefield, Connecticut, U.S.
- Occupations: Opera singer; actress
- Years active: 1901–1922
- Spouse: Lou Tellegen (m. 1916; div. 1923)

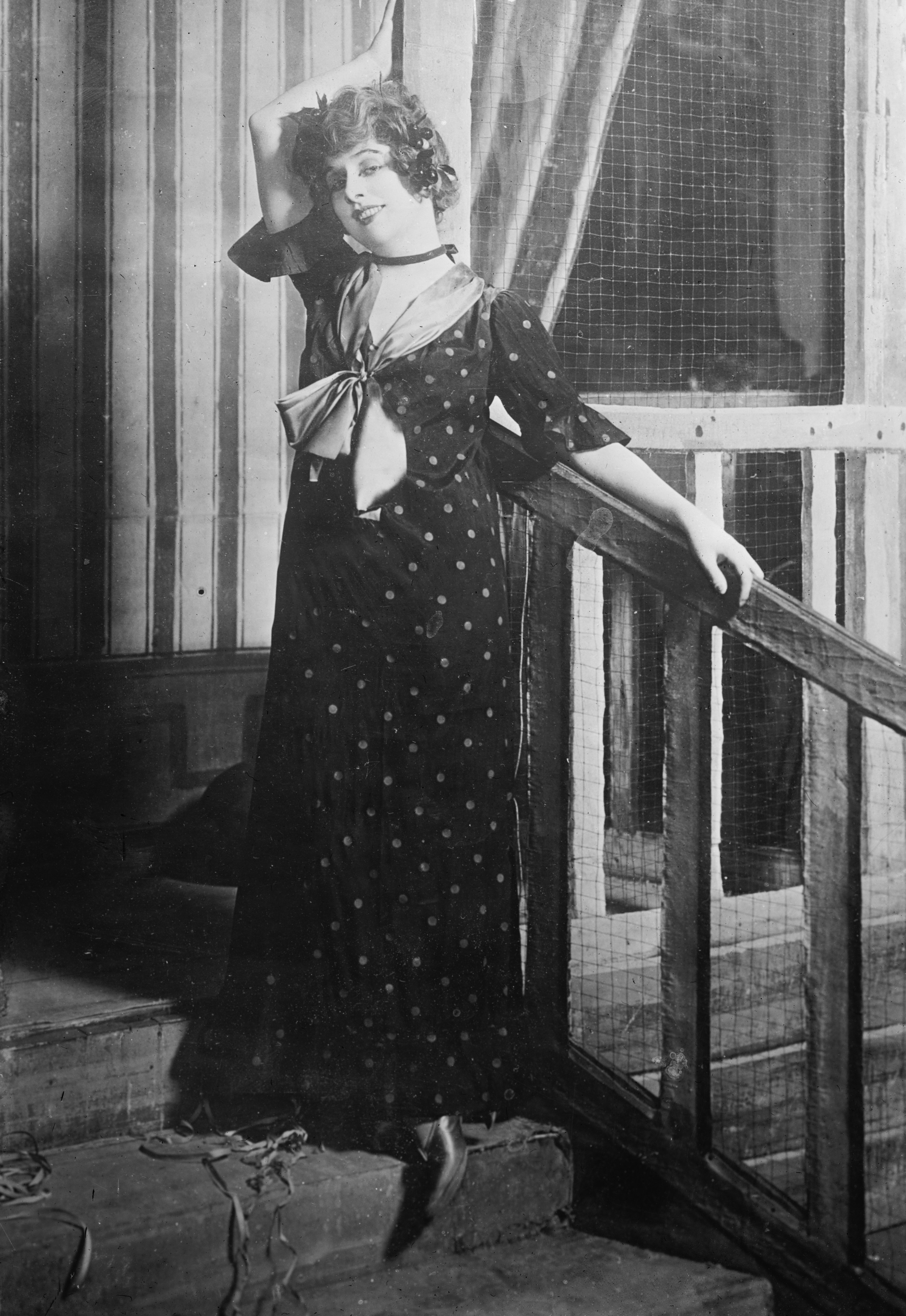
Farrar in Julien in 1914

Alice Geraldine Farrar (February 28, 1882 – March 11, 1967) was an American lyric soprano who also frequently sang dramatic roles. She was noted for her beauty, acting ability, and "the intimate timbre of her voice." In the 1910s, she also found success as an actress in silent films. Farrar had a large following among young women, who were nicknamed "Gerry-flappers".

== Early life and education ==
Farrar was born in Melrose, Massachusetts, the daughter of baseball player Sidney Farrar, and his wife Henrietta Barnes. At age five, she began studying music in Boston and by 14 was giving recitals. Later she studied voice with the American soprano Emma Thursby in New York City, in Paris, and finally with the Italian baritone Francesco Graziani in Berlin. Farrar created a sensation at the Berlin Hofoper with her debut as Marguerite in Charles Gounod's Faust in 1901 and remained with the company for three years, during which time she continued her studies with famed German soprano Lilli Lehmann. (She had been recommended to Lehmann by another famous soprano of the previous generation, Lillian Nordica.) She appeared in the title roles of Giuseppe Verdi’s La traviata, Ambroise Thomas' Mignon and Jules Massenet's Manon, as well as Juliette in Gounod's Roméo et Juliette. Her admirers in Berlin included Crown Prince Wilhelm of Germany, with whom she is believed to have had a relationship beginning in 1903.

== Career in grand opera ==
After three years with the Monte Carlo Opera, Farrar made her debut at the New York Metropolitan Opera in Roméo et Juliette on November 26, 1906. She appeared in the title role in the first Met performance of Giacomo Puccini's Madama Butterfly in 1907 and remained a member of the company until her retirement in 1922, singing 29 roles there in 672 performances. She developed a great popular following, especially among New York's young female opera-goers, who were known as "Gerry-flappers". Farrar created the title roles in Pietro Mascagni's Amica (Monte Carlo, 1905), Puccini's Suor Angelica (New York City, 1918), Umberto Giordano's Madame Sans-Gêne (New York, 1915), as well as the Goosegirl in Engelbert Humperdinck's Königskinder (New York, 1910), for which Farrar trained her own flock of geese. According to a review in the New York Tribune of the first performance, "at the close of the opera Miss Farrar caused 'much amusement' by appearing before the curtain with a live goose under her arm."

According to her biographer:

"Unlike most of the famous bel canto singers of the past who sacrificed dramatic action to tonal perfection, she was more interested in the emotional than in the purely lyrical aspects of her roles. According to Miss Farrar, until prime donne can combine the arts of Sarah Bernhardt and Nellie Melba, dramatic ability is more essential than perfect singing in opera."

— Elizabeth Nash

Farrar recorded prodigiously for the Victor Talking Machine Company and was often featured prominently in that firm's advertisements.

== Film career ==
Farrar also appeared in silent films, which were produced between opera seasons. Literary and film critic Edward Wagenknecht describes Geraldine Farrar as “the most illustrious artist Paramount brought to the screen.” The acquisition of Farrar by producer Jesse Lasky in 1915 was regarded as “the most sensational coup in motion-picture history” at the time. As a prima donna of the Metropolitan Opera, Farrar’s arrival in Hollywood was greeted with great anticipation and fanfare:

When her private car arrived at Santa Fe station, the mayor of Los Angeles was on hand to greet her. All six of her Lasky films were directed by Cecil B. DeMille, with whom she hit it off perfectly, being much adored by her fellow workers, down to the very prop boys, as she had been by the stagehands at the Metropolitan.

She starred in more than a dozen films from 1915 to 1920, including Cecil B. De Mille's 1915 adaptation of Georges Bizet's opera Carmen. The film’s premiere at Symphony Hall in Boston was preceded by a fulsome publicity campaign and garnered effusive reviews by critics. San Francisco Call & Post wrote:

The resolution of Geraldine Farrar, the beautiful and gifted star, to employ her talents in the attainment of success in the films is one of the greatest steps in advancing the dignity of the motion pictures. Miss Farrar's 'Carmen' in the films is the greatest triumph the motion picture has yet achieved over the speaking stage.”

For her performance, she came in first among the women in the 1916 "Screen Masterpiece" contest held by Motion Picture Magazine. One of her other notable screen roles —and the one that Farrar personally ranked her finest—was as Joan of Arc in the 1916 film Joan the Woman.

In June 1931, Farrar made her debut radio broadcast over the National Broadcasting Company's nationwide "Red" network.

In 1960, Farrar was awarded two stars on the Hollywood Walk of Fame, in the music and film categories, located at 1620 and 1709 Vine Street.

== Personal life ==
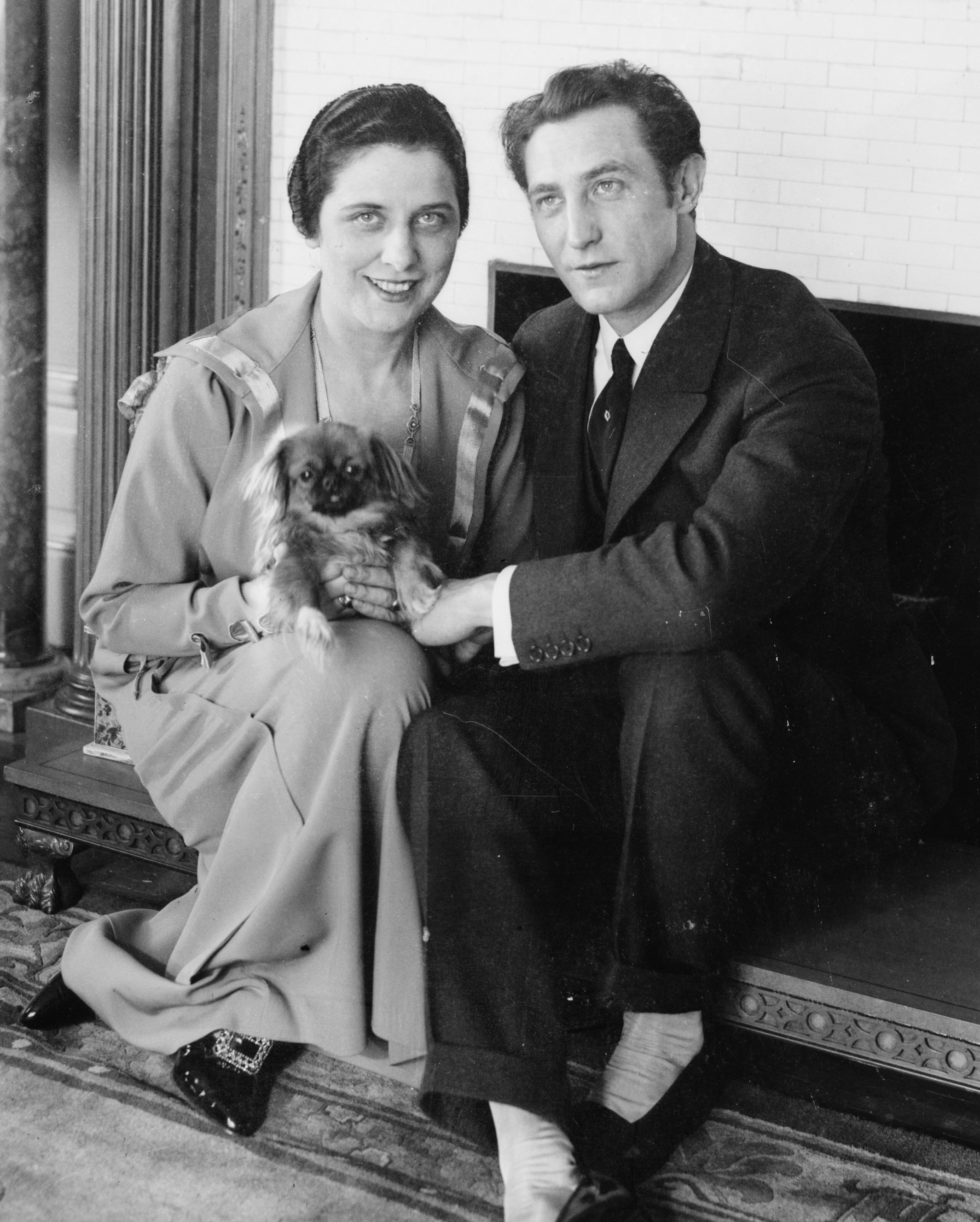
Farrar and husband Lou Tellegen in 1916.

Beginning in 1908, Farrar had a seven-year love affair with the Italian conductor Arturo Toscanini. Her ultimatum, that he leave his wife and children and marry her, caused Toscanini to abruptly resign his position as principal conductor of the Metropolitan Opera in 1915. Farrar was a close friend to the Met's star tenor Enrico Caruso and there has been speculation that they too had a love affair. It is said that Caruso coined her motto: Farrar farà ("Farrar will do it").

Farrar's marriage to actor Lou Tellegen on February 8, 1916, was the source of considerable scandal. The marriage ended, as a result of her husband's numerous affairs, in a very public divorce in 1923. The circumstances of the divorce were brought again to public recollection in 1934, following Tellegen's bizarre suicide in Hollywood. When told of Tellegen's death, Farrar reportedly said "Why should that interest me?"

Farrar retired from opera in 1922 at the age of 40; her final Met performance was as Leoncavallo's Zazà. By this stage, her voice was in premature decline due to overwork. According to the American music critic Henry Pleasants, the author of The Great Singers from the Dawn of Opera to Our Own Time (first published 1967), she gave between 25 and 35 performances each season at the Met alone. They included 95 appearances as Madama Butterfly and 58 as Carmen in 16 seasons. The title role in Puccini's Tosca, which she had added to her repertoire in 1909, was another one of her favourite Met parts.

Within several weeks of announcing her retirement from opera, Farrar transitioned into concert performances, signing to appear at a recital at Hershey Park on Memorial Day 1922. She continued to make recordings and give recitals throughout the 1920s and was briefly the intermission commentator for the Metropolitan Opera radio broadcasts during the 1934–35 season. In 1938, Farrar published an unusual autobiography, titled Such Sweet Compulsion. The book was written in alternating chapters purporting to be her own words and those of her deceased mother, with Mrs. Farrar rather floridly recounting her daughter's many accomplishments.

Geraldine Farrar died in Ridgefield, Connecticut of heart disease in 1967, at the age of 85; she was buried in Kensico Cemetery in Valhalla, New York. She had no children.

== Filmography ==
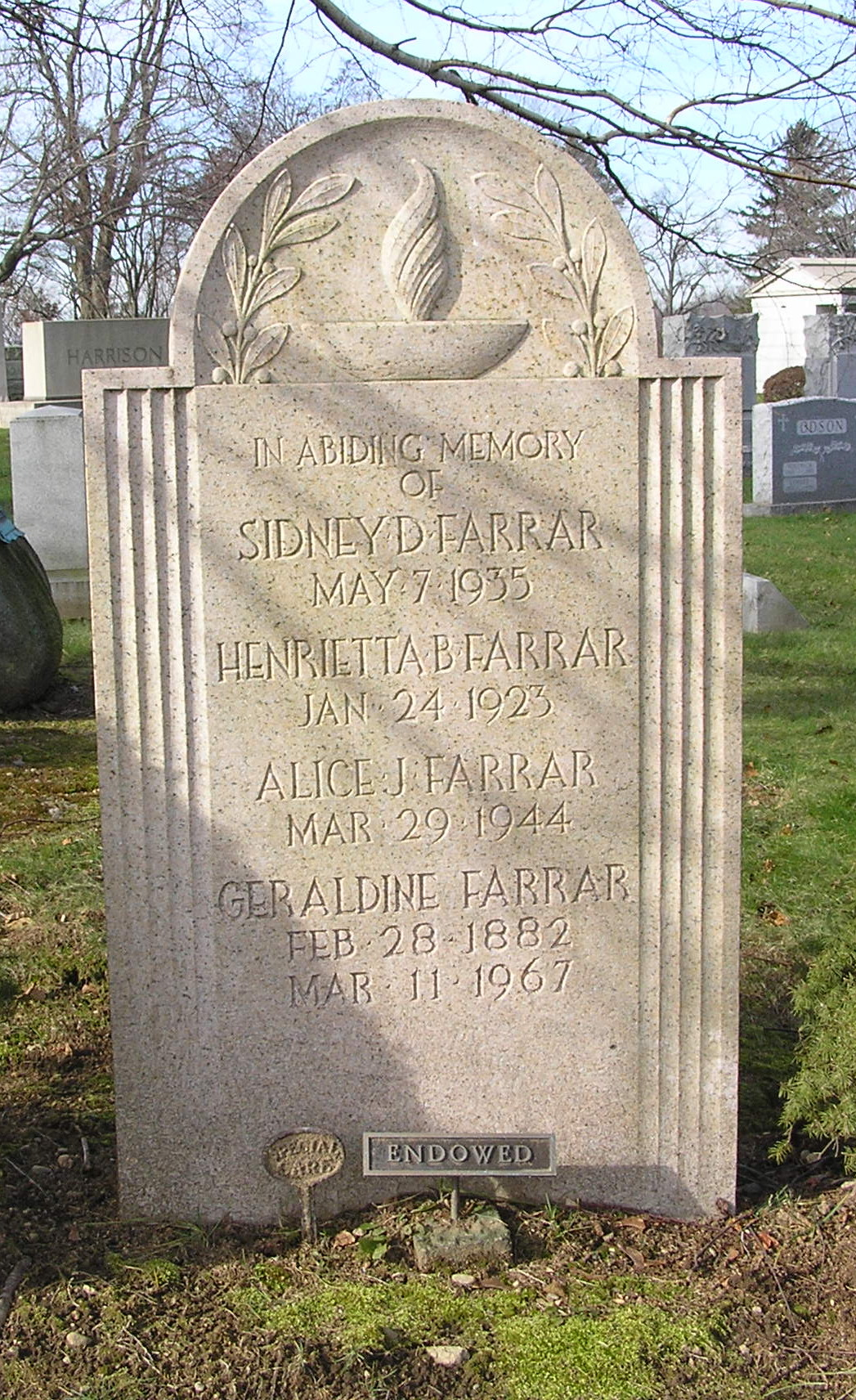
The headstone of Geraldine Farrar in Kensico Cemetery in Valhalla, New York.

Year	Title	Role	Notes
1915	Carmen	Carmen	
1915	Temptation	Renee Dupree	Lost film
1916	Maria Rosa	Maria Rosa	
1916	Joan the Woman	Jeanne d'Arc	
1917	The Woman God Forgot	Tecza (daughter of Montezuma)	
1917	The Devil-Stone	Marcia Manot	Incomplete film, only two of six reels survive
1918	The Turn of the Wheel	Rosalie Dean	Lost film
1918	The Bonds That Tie	Miss Columbia	Short; Lost film
1918	The Hell Cat	Pancha O'Brien	undetermined/presumably Lost film
1919	Shadows	Muriel Barnes / Cora Lamont	Incomplete film, only one reel survives
1919	The Stronger Vow	Dolores de Cordova	undetermined/presumably Lost film
1919	The World and Its Woman	Marcia Warren	
1919	Flame of the Desert	Lady Isabelle Channing	
1920	The Woman and the Puppet	Concha Perez	
1920	The Riddle: Woman	Lilla Gravert	undetermined/presumably Lost film

== Media ==
Manon! avez-vous peur...On l'appelle Manon
Enrico Caruso and Geraldine Farrar in a 1912 recording from Act II of Massenet's Manon.

== In popular culture ==
The American author Barbara Paul has written several murder mystery novels featuring Geraldine Farrar, Enrico Caruso, and the Metropolitan Opera.
