= Nalbro Bartley =

American novelist

- Born: November 10, 1888; Buffalo, New York, U.S.
- Died: September 7, 1952 (aged 63); San Francisco, California, U.S.
- Occupation: Writer (novelist)
- Spouse(s): Charles Leonard Shaw; William Horace Lerch; Martin Lee Clark
- Children: 1
- Writing career
- Period: 20th century
- Genres: Fiction, romance

Nalbro Isadorah Bartley (November 10, 1888 – September 7, 1952), was an American short story writer, newspaper columnist and lecturer. Her serialized stories began appearing in popular magazines of the day while she was still in her early twenties.

== Background ==
Bartley was born in Buffalo, New York in 1888. Her father was William Bartley who worked as an entertainer and her mother was Zayda Erndt. She had an older sibling. She was married three times. She had a son John with her first husband, Charles Leornard Shaw. The marriage ended in divorce. Bartley lived in Utica, NY with her son where she was an active Zonta Club member. In 1925 she married Horace Lerch, sports editor of Buffalo Express, and moved to Niagara Falls, NY. W. Horace Lerch died June 6, 1931. Her third husband, Martin Lee Clark stayed with her until her death in 1952.

Nalbro Bartley began working as a governess at 16. From 1907-09 she was a reporter for Buffalo Morning Express. In 1909 she went to New York City as a free lance writer. In 1917 she wrote for the Saturday Evening Post in Buffalo. Bartley was one of six local Buffalo women listed in the September 1, 1930 edition of Who's Who in America.

== Works ==
- Paradise Auction, 1917
- The Bargain True, 1918
- The Vanity Pool, 1918
- A Woman's Woman, 1919
- The Bramble Bush, 1919
- The Gorgeous Girl, 1920 †
- The Gray Angels, 1920 †
- Miss Antique, 1920
- Fair to Middling, 1921
- Head Over Heels, 1922
- Up and Coming, 1923
- Judd & Judd, 1924
- Bread and Jam, 1925
- Her Mother's Daughter, 1926 ††
- The Dear Little Thing, 1926
- Morning Thunder, 1927
- The Mediocrat, 1928
- The Godfather, 1929
- The Fox Woman, 1929
- The Immediate Family, 1930
- The Premeditated Virgin, 1931
- The Devil's Lottery, 1931
- The Amateur Wife, 1932
- Pease Porridge Hot, 1934
- Breathless, 1934

† Available at Project Gutenberg
†† Available at Faded Page

Sources: WorldCat, Open Library, IMDb.

== Screen adaptations ==
Some of her novels and stories were adapted to the movie screen. Up to seven of these were released between 1918 and 1932 including Head Over Heels and The Amateur Wife.
