= Lillian Herlein =

American actress

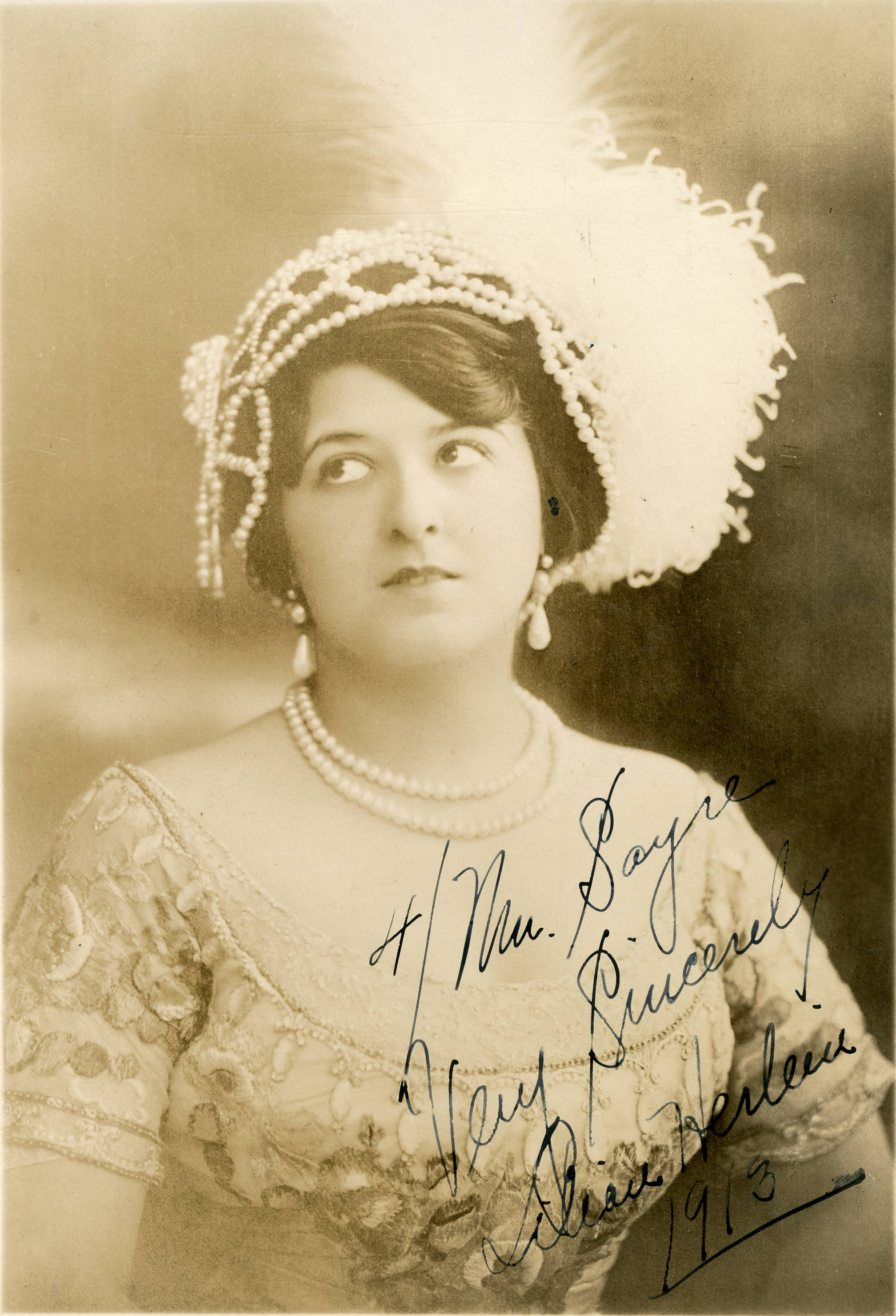
An autographed photograph of Herlein from 1913

Lillian Herlein (March 11, 1895 – April 13, 1971) was an actress and singer in theater and vaudeville in the early 20th century. In vaudeville, she was sometimes known more for display of her figure than for the quality of her performances.

Herlein had the role of Zoradie in The Rose of Algeria produced by the Herald Square Theatre in New York City in September 1909. The audience demanded an encore of her rendition of "The Rose of the World", part of the Victor Herbert music. Her other Broadway credits included The Never Homes (1911) and Man Bites Dog (1933).

She played the 5th Avenue Theatre in New York City with Keith & Proctor in vaudeville afterward. Herlein performed at the Brighton Beach Music Hall in July 1911. She was in a charity benefit at the New York Hippodrome, for the Christmas Fund of the New York American and Evening Journal, in December 1911. Proceeds were donated to the poor of New York City.

The Orpheum Theatre in Brooklyn, New York presented A Hungarian Rhapsody and the musical comedy, Sweeties, in June 1919 with Herlein among the players. In July she was a member of the Alla Maslova Ballet. The troupe presented Kiss Me in Washington, D.C., at the B.F. Keith Theatre, 675 15th Street NW.

Herlein also appeared at the Palace Theater and Winter Garden Theater on Broadway and in Europe. In her later years she was on radio and television and was a character actor in films. Her movie credits are for a role as Mrs. Levy in Solomon In Society (1922) and an uncredited part in Thanks For The Memory (1938).

On April 13, 1971, Herlein died at French Hospital, 8th Avenue and West 30th Street, at age 76. She was the widow of Charles G. Strakosch, who died in June 1965. They had a son, Charles Jr.
