= Violet Lloyd =

Violet Lloyd may refer to:

- Vi Lloyd (1923–2013), Australian politician
- Violet Lloyd (actress) (1879 – c. 1924), English actress, singer and music hall performer
