= Second childhood =

Second childhood may refer to:

- Senile dementia
- Second Childhood, a 1976 album by Phoebe Snow
- Second Childhood (film), a 1936 film in the Our Gang series
- A Second Childhood, a 2010 Italian drama film
