= William Scully (director) =

American director and production manager (1889–1949)

William Joseph Scully (March 19, 1889–May 1, 1949), sometimes credited as William Scully, "W. J. Scully", or "Bill Scully", was an American film executive. He is credited as a production manager and assistant director on many films.

William Scully was born in New York City. He started his career in the movie industry at Biograph Studios. In 1925, he moved to Hollywood where he worked at Cecile B. DeMille Studios and went on to work with several major film companies.

== Filmography ==
=== Director ===
- Annabel Lee (1921)
- Cuando el amor ríe (1931)

=== Assistant Director ===
- My Son, the Hero (1943)
- Rosalie (1937)
- On the Avenue (1937)
- Born to Dance (1936)
- Private Number (1936)
- Broadway Melody of 1936 (1935)
- Born to Be Bad (1934)
- If I Had a Million (1932)
- The Last of the Duanes (1930)
- Hell's Angels (1930)
- Paris Bound (1929)
- Tenth Avenue (1928)
- The Blue Danube (1928)
- Turkish Delight (1927)
- His Dog (1927)
- The Clinging Vine (1926)
- Eve's Leaves (1926)
- Made for Love (1926)
- The Coming of Amos (1925)
- Greater Than Fame (1920)
- The Country Cousin (1919)
- A Society Exile (1919)
- The Avalanche (1919)
- The Reason Why (1918)
- Her Better Self (1917)

=== Production Manager ===
- Gone with the Wind (1939)
