= The Unknown Lover =

1925 film

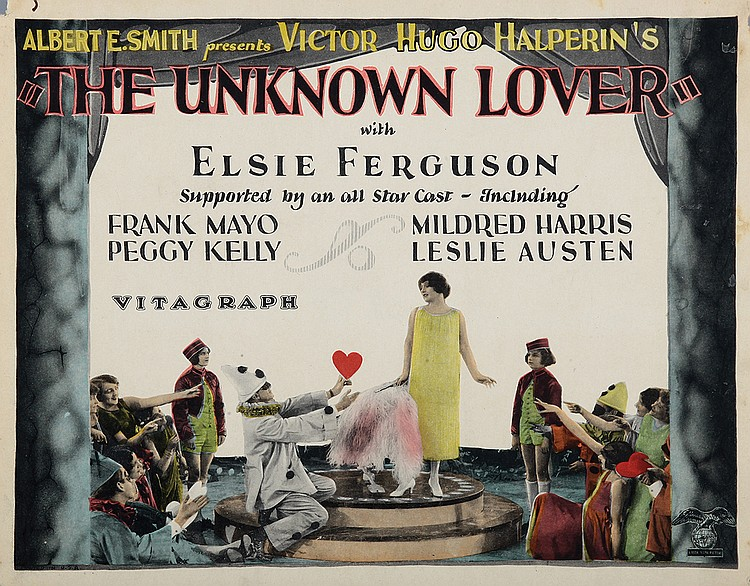
- Lobby card
- Directed by: Victor Halperin
- Written by: Victor Halperin (scenario)
- Produced by: Victory Pictures (aka Victor Halperin Productions)
- Starring: Elsie Ferguson; Frank Mayo; Mildred Harris
- Production company: The Vitagraph Company of America
- Distributed by: Warner Bros. Pictures
- Release date: October 30, 1925
- Running time: 7 reels (6,895 feet)
- Country: United States
- Language: Silent (English intertitles)

The Unknown Lover is a 1925 American silent drama film produced and directed by Victor Halperin (an early effort for him) under his Victory Pictures banner and released by the Vitagraph Company of America, soon to become part of Warner Bros. This is the last silent film of star Elsie Ferguson.

== Cast ==
- Elsie Ferguson as Elaine Kent
- Frank Mayo as Kenneth Billings
- Mildred Harris as Gale Norman
- Peggy Kelly as Gladys
- Leslie Austin as Fred Wagner
- Josephine Norman

== Preservation ==
With no prints of The Unknown Lover located in any film archives, it is a lost film
