= Ransom (1928 film) =

1928 film

- Directed by: George B. Seitz
- Written by: Elmer Blaney Harris; Dorothy Howell; George B. Seitz
- Produced by: Harry Cohn
- Starring: Lois Wilson
- Cinematography: Joseph Walker
- Distributed by: Columbia Pictures
- Release date: June 30, 1928
- Running time: 58 minutes
- Country: United States
- Language: Silent

Ransom is a 1928 American silent drama film directed by George B. Seitz and is considered to be lost. This is one of the many films of this period that sought to cash in on the fame of the then-popular Sax Rohmer Fu Manchu novels. Surprisingly, Columbia resorted to aping the character instead of attempting to secure the rights legally from the author. The following year, Paramount released the first of a Fu Manchu trilogy of films that were very successful.

== Plot ==
An Asian mastermind named Wu Fang, who controls the Chinese underground in San Francisco, learns of the recent invention of a poisonous gas which can be used as a biological weapon, invented by a Dr. Burton Meredith. Wu Fang kidnaps Bobby, the young brother of Dr. Meredith's fiancée Lois, and offers to trade the boy's life for the secret formula. Lois goes to Wu Fang's secret hideout to rescue her brother but winds up being captured herself. Just as Wu Fang prepares to torture her, Dr. Meredith bursts in with the police and saves both captives in the nick of time.

== Cast ==
- William V. Mong as Wu Fang
- Edmund Burns as Burton Meredith, scientist
- Lois Wilson as Lois Brewster, fiancée
- Jackie Combs as Bobby Brewster, the kid brother
- Blue Washington as Oliver
- James B. Leong as Scarface
