= Violet Lloyd (actress) =

English actress and singer (1879–1924)

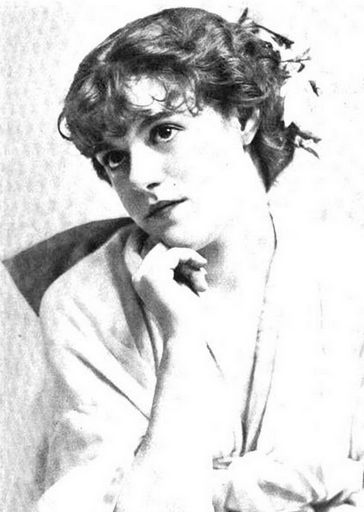
- Violet Lloyd, from an 1896 publication
- Born: 25 November 1879; London, England
- Died: c. 1924
- Occupations: Actor, singer
- Years active: 1889–1917
- Spouse: Horace Lane
- Relatives: Florence Lloyd (sister)

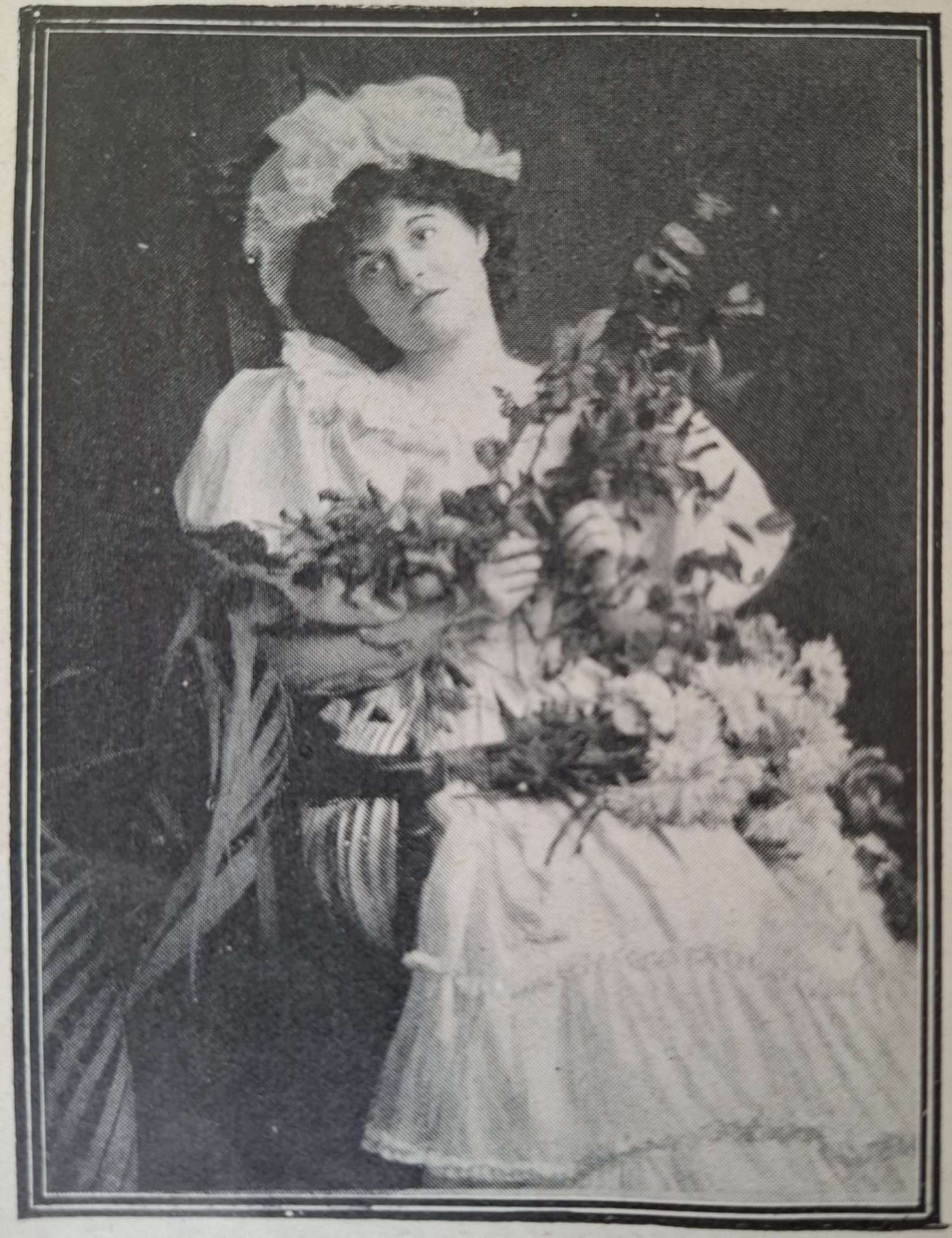
Photo of Violet Lloyd as seen in the Black and White Budget, 10 November 1900.

Violet Lloyd (25 November 1879 – c. 1924) was an English actress, singer and Edwardian music hall performer. Her father was Samuel Lloyd, and her sister was Florence Lloyd (born 1876), who was also an actress. Violet was a second cousin of Lydia Thompson, and her daughter Zeffie Tilbury.

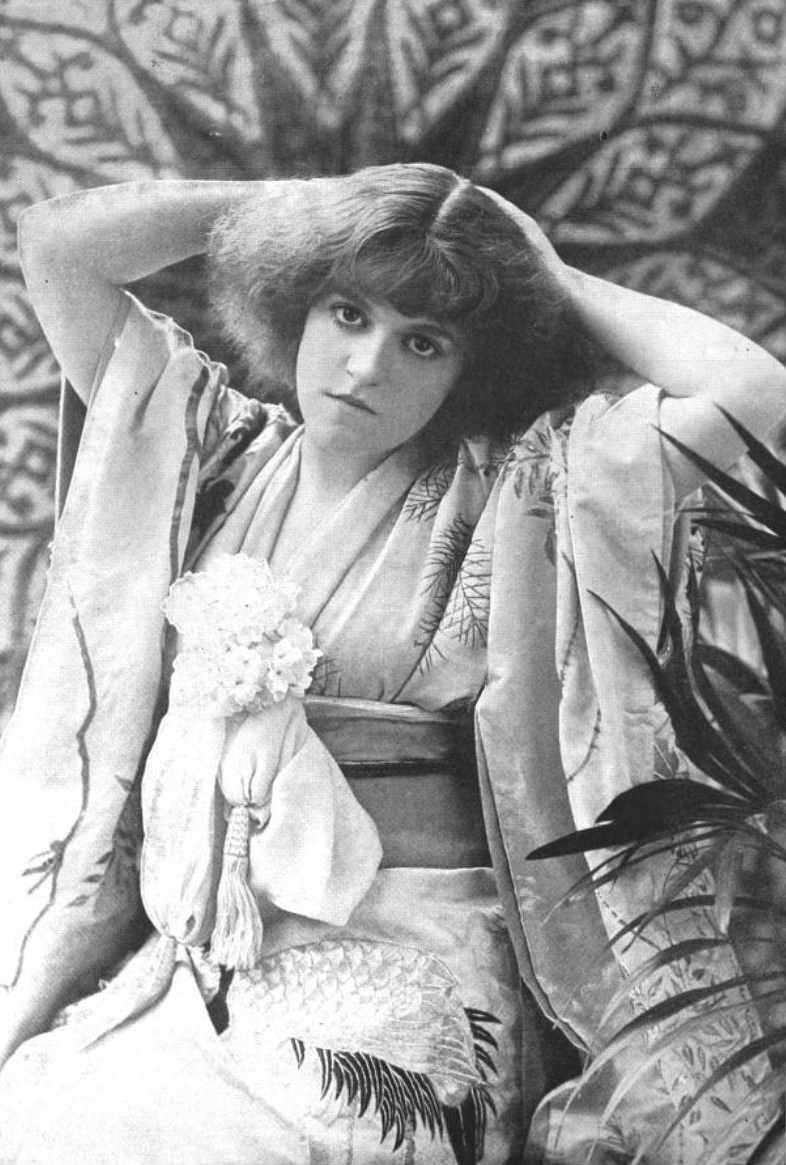
In The Geisha in New York, 1896

Lloyd made her stage debut at ten years old in February 1889, appearing with The Kendals at the Theatre Royal, Nottingham. She made many appearances at the Gaiety Theatre, especially in an Asian-themed play called The Geisha. She was the understudy to Ellaline Terriss at the Gaiety, and after 1905 she toured with the George Edwardes company. Many later roles in the theatre were well-known children's characters i.e. Humpty-Dumpty, Red Riding Hood, Jack and the Beanstalk, and Aladdin.
