= Sacred and Profane Love (film) =

1921 film

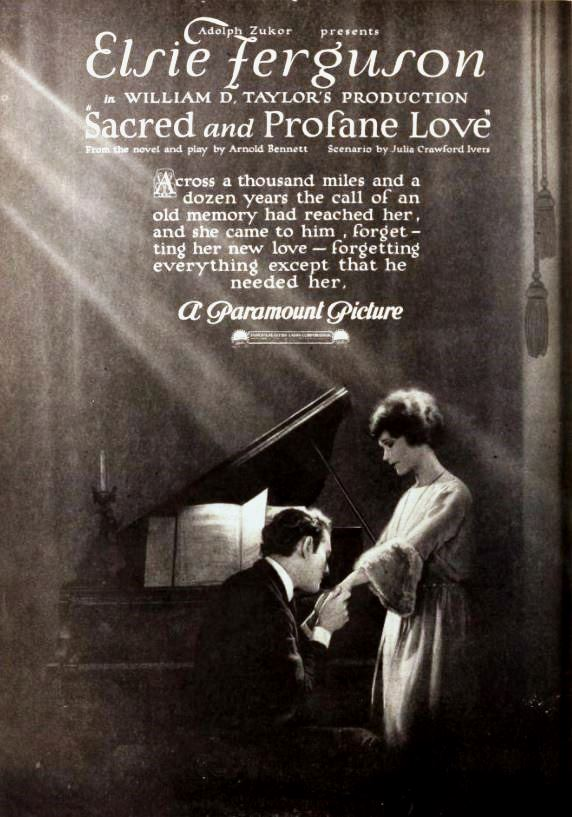
- Poster with Nagel and Ferguson
- Directed by: William Desmond Taylor
- Written by: Julia Crawford Ivers
- Based on: The Book of Carlotta by Arnold Bennett
- Produced by: Adolph Zukor; Jesse Lasky
- Starring: Elsie Ferguson; Conrad Nagel
- Cinematography: Ted D. McCord; James Van Trees
- Distributed by: Paramount Pictures
- Release date: May 22, 1921
- Running time: 5 to 6 reels
- Country: United States
- Language: Silent (English intertitles)

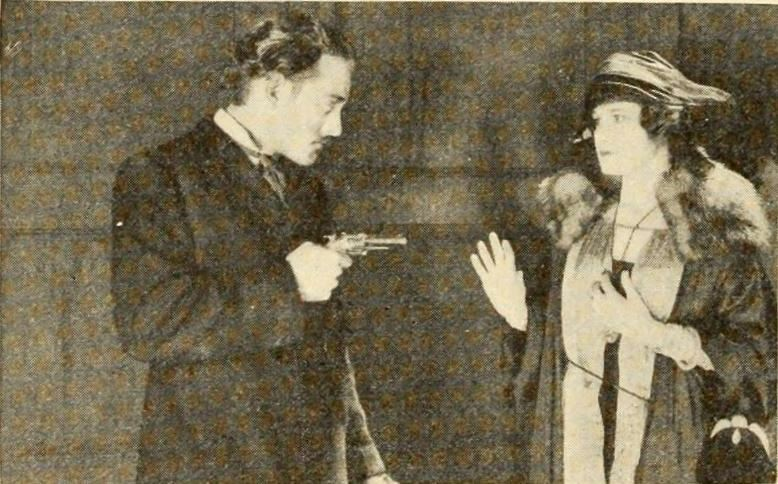
Film still with Nagel and Ferguson.

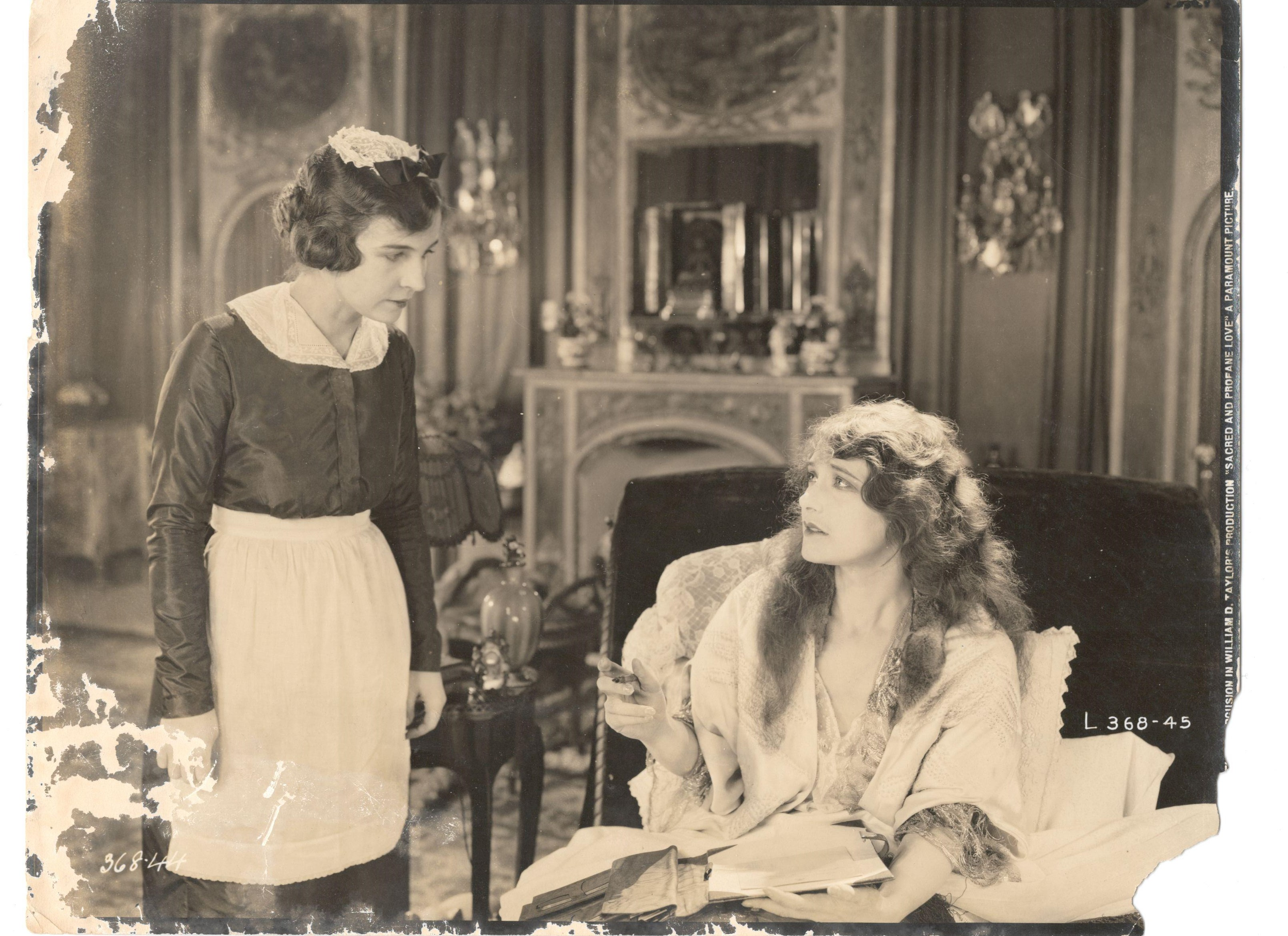
Barbara Gurney and Elsie Ferguson.

Sacred and Profane Love is a 1921 American silent drama film produced by Famous Players–Lasky and distributed by Paramount Pictures. This film was directed by William Desmond Taylor and starred Elsie Ferguson with Conrad Nagel. It is based on a book The Book of Carlotta by Arnold Bennett and was turned into a 1920 Broadway play which also starred Elsie Ferguson. Writer/director Julia Crawford Ivers adapted the book and play to the screen while her son James Van Trees served as one of the film's cinematographers. All known copies of this film are lost.

== Plot ==
As described in a film publication summary, Carlotta Peel, brought up by a maiden aunt with maiden ideas, secretly attends a concert by Emilie Diaz. After the concert she meets the pianist and later succumbs to the strains of "Samson and Delilah" played by Emilie. Carlotta spends the night with Emilie and returns home the next morning to find her aunt dead. She does not see Emilie again, and after several years she is a well known novelist who is loved by her publisher, Frank Ispenlove. The publisher's wife Mary commits suicide because of her husband's affair with Carlotta. Frank then kills himself. After some time Carlotta finds Emilie living in Paris, a morphine addict, originally prescribed for his tremors. She nurses him back to health and his musical gift is restored. She is now happy with her first love.

== Cast ==
- Elsie Ferguson as Carlotta Peel
- Conrad Nagel as Emilie Diaz, pianist
- Thomas Holding as Frank Ispenlove
- Helen Dunbar as Constance Peel
- Winifred Greenwood as Mary Ispenlove
- Raymond Blathwayt as Lord Francis Alcar
- Clarissa Selwynne as Mrs. Sardis
- Howard Gaye as Albert Vicary
- Forrest Stanley as Samson
- Jane Keckley as Rebecca
- Barbara Gurney as A Parlor Maid
