= Heart of the Wilds =

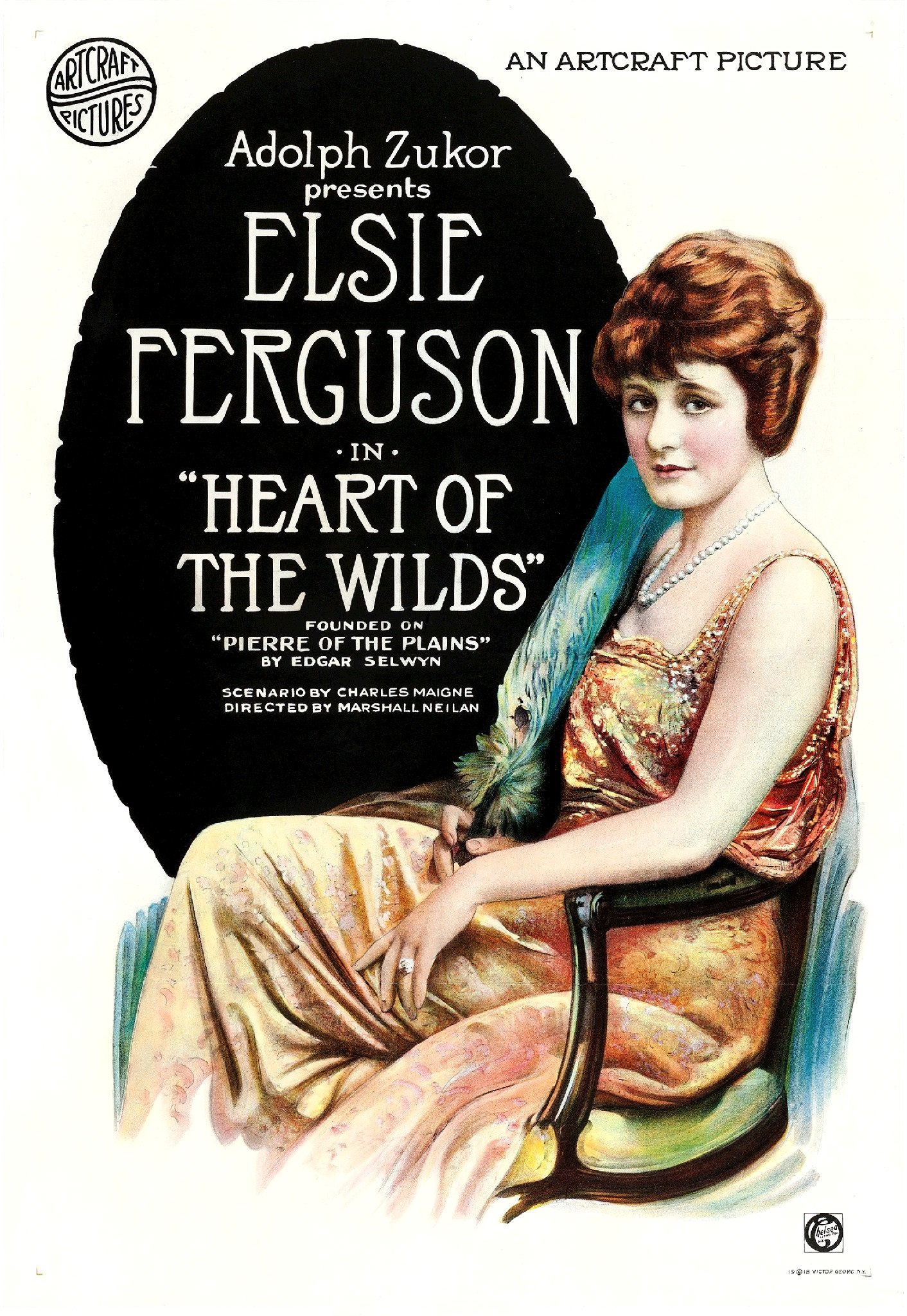
- Film poster
- Directed by: Marshall Neilan
- Written by: Charles Maigne (scenario)
- Based on: She of the Triple Chevron by Gilbert Parker
- Produced by: Adolph Zukor; Jesse Lasky
- Starring: Elsie Ferguson
- Cinematography: Walter Stradling
- Distributed by: Artcraft Pictures
- Release date: August 18, 1918
- Running time: 50 minutes; 5 reels
- Country: United States
- Language: Silent (English intertitles)

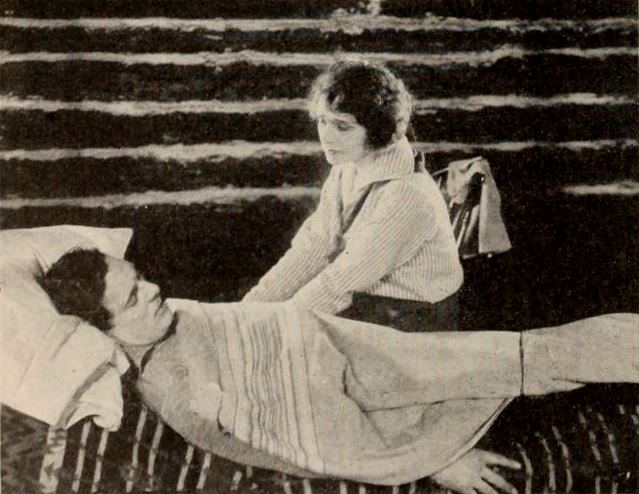
Still with Ferguson and Meighan.

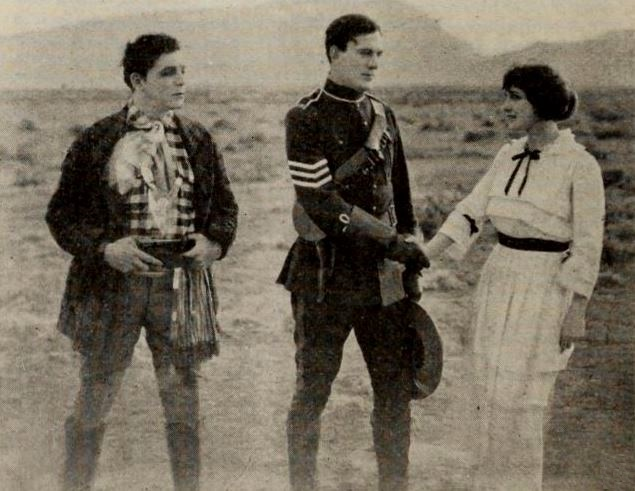
a scene in the film.

Heart of the Wilds is a lost 1918 American silent drama film directed by Marshall Neilan and starring Elsie Ferguson. The story is from "Pierre and His People", by Gilbert Parker, which Edgar Selwyn also based his play Pierre of the Plains on. Ferguson had become a star in 1908 in Selwyn's Broadway play.

== Cast ==
- Elsie Ferguson as Jen Galbraith
- Thomas Meighan as Sergeant Tom Gellatly
- Joseph W. Smiley as Peter Galbraith (credited as Joseph Smiley)
- Matt Moore as Val Galbraith
- E. L. Fernandez as Pierre (billed Escamillo Fernandez)
- Sidney D'Albrook as Grey Cloud

== Reception ==
Like many American films of the time, Heart of the Wilds was subject to cuts by city and state film censorship boards. For example, the Chicago Board of Censors modified the plot of this film by requiring cuts in Reel 2 of Val drawing a gun from case, shooting Grey Cloud, and putting the gun away after the shooting, the cuts intending to eliminate the entire idea that the Indian was shot by Val. The board also cut, in Reel 4, Jen shooting Sergeant Tom Gellatly of the mounted police.

== See also ==
- Over the Border (1922)
