= Edmund Burns =

American silent film actor (1892–1980)

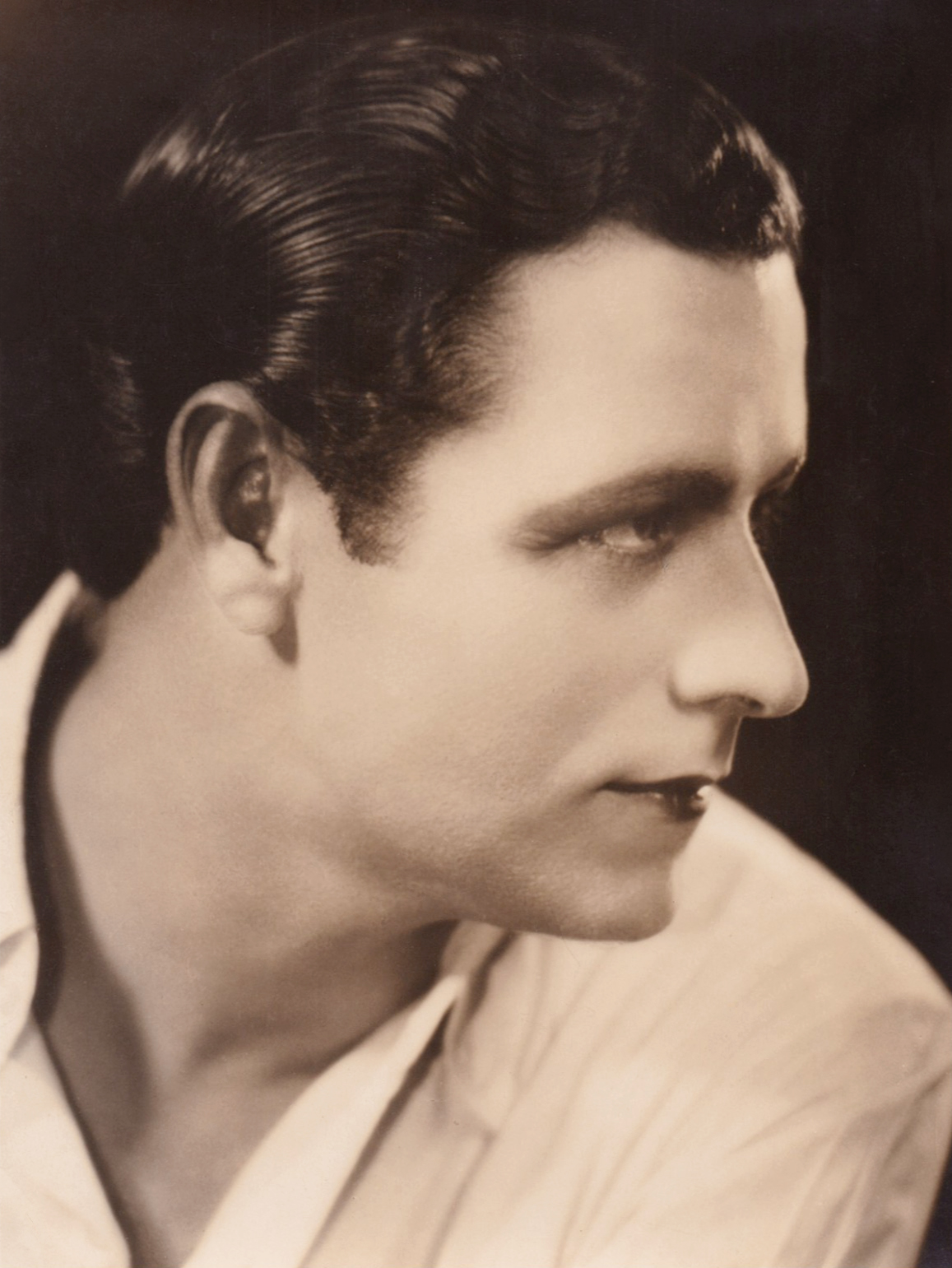
- Burns in 1925, photographed by Edwin Bower Hesser
- Born: September 27, 1892; Philadelphia, Pennsylvania, U.S.
- Died: April 2, 1980 (aged 87); Los Angeles, California, U.S.
- Other names: Edward Burns
- Occupation: Actor

Edmund Burns (sometimes billed as Edward Burns; September 27, 1892 – April 2, 1980) was an American actor.

== Early years ==
Burns was a twin and one of 13 children in a Catholic family in Philadelphia. He acted in plays when he was in high school. After he lost a job with the Post Toasties company, he decided to try acting as a profession. A successful screen test led to his first work in films. Cecil B. DeMille changed his first name from Edward to Edmund.

== Career ==
Burns was best known for his films of the silent 1920s, particularly The Princess from Hoboken (1927), Made for Love (1926), and After the Fog (1929), although he continued acting in films until 1936. Burn's first film appearance was an uncredited role as an extra in The Birth of a Nation (1915). Other films include The Country Kid (1923), The Farmer from Texas (1925), Ransom (1928), The Adorable Outcast (1928), Hard to Get (1929), The Shadow of the Eagle (1932), Hollywood Boulevard (1936), and his final film, Charles Barton's Murder with Pictures (1936) for Paramount Pictures.

== Personal life ==
Burns was married to Ruth Curry, whom he met at Camp Baldy resort. She was a widow with three children and the resort's owner. Burns left acting and became co-manager there.

== Partial filmography ==
Year	Title	Role	Notes
1915	The Birth of a Nation	Klansman	
1917	Diamonds and Pearls	John Leffingwell Jr.	
1917	The Slave	Egbert Atwell	Credited as Edward Burns
1917	Her Hour	Dick Christie	Credited as Edward Burns
1918	The Wasp	Harry's roommate	Credited as Edward Burns
1918	The Danger Mark	Scott Seagrave	Credited as Edward Burns
1918	Love Watches	Count Andre de Juvigny	
1918	The Ordeal of Rosetta	Dick	
1918	Under the Greenwood Tree	Sir Kenneth Graham	Credited as Edward Burns
1919	Marriage for Convenience	Ned Gardiner	Credited as Edward Burns
1919	Male and Female	Treherne	
1920	Pegeen	John Archibald	
1920	The Virgin of Stamboul	Hector Baron	
1920	Eyes of the Heart	Mike Hogan	
1920	To Please One Woman	Dr. John Ransome	
1921	Opened Shutters	John Dunham	
1921	Hickville to Broadway	Peter Van Reuter	
1921	Outlawed	Sophy Robbin	
1921	Fifty Candles	Ralph Coolidge	
1922	East Is West	Billy Benson	
1922	The Lavender Bath Lady	David Bruce	
1922	Lights of the Desert	Andrew Reed	
1922	The Woman's Side	Theodore Van Ness Jr.	
1923	The Dangerous Age	Tom	
1923	Jazzmania	Sonny Daimler	
1923	Scars of Jealousy	Jeff Newland	
1923	The Country Kid	Arthur Grant	
1924	The Humming Bird	Randall Carey	
1924	Broadway After Dark	Jack Devlin	
1924	Those Who Dare	Harry Rollins	
1925	The Manicure Girl	Antonio Luca	
1925	The Farmer from Texas	Erik	
1925	The Million Dollar Handicap	George Mortimer	
1926	Made for Love	Nicholas Ainsworth / Aziru	
1926	Paris at Midnight	Eugene de Rastagnic	
1926	Out of the Storm	James Morton	
1926	Whispering Wires	Barry McGill	
1926	The Lodge in the Wilderness	Jim Wallace	
1927	The Princess from Hoboken	Terence O'Brien	
1927	The Shamrock and the Rose	Tom Kelly	
1927	The Chinese Parrot	Robert Eden	
1928	Ransom	Burton Meredith, scientist	
1928	The Adorable Outcast	Stephen Conn	
1928	Phyllis of the Follies	Clyde Thompson	
1929	She Goes to War	Reggie	
1929	After the Fog	John Temple	
1929	Hard to Get	Dexter Courtland	
1929	Tanned Legs	Clinton Darrow	
1931	Sea Devils	Richard Charters	
1931	Hell-Bent for Frisco	Frank Kenton	
1932	The Shadow of the Eagle	Clark, a director	
1932	The Death Kiss	Miles Brent	Uncredited
1932	Western Limited	Sinclair	
1933	Rusty Rides Alone	Steve Reynolds	
1936	Hollywood Boulevard	Pago Pago patron	Uncredited
