= Eyes of the Soul =

1919 film by Emile Chautard

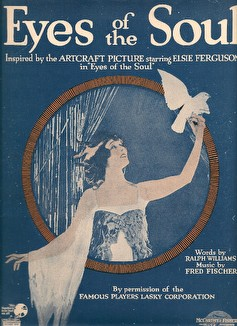
- 1919 sheet music cover
- Directed by: Emile Chautard
- Written by: Eve Unsell (scenario)
- Based on: Salt of the Earth by George Weston
- Produced by: Adolph Zukor; Jesse Lasky
- Starring: Elsie Ferguson
- Cinematography: Jacques Bizeul(fr)
- Music by: Fred Fisher(*as Fred Fischer); Ralph Williams (lyrics)
- Distributed by: Paramount Pictures / Artcraft
- Release date: April 20, 1919
- Running time: 5 reels
- Country: United States
- Language: Silent (English intertitles)

Eyes of the Soul is a lost 1919 American silent romantic drama film produced by Famous Players–Lasky and distributed through Paramount Pictures and Artcraft. The star of the picture is Elsie Ferguson and its director was Emile Chautard.

== Plot ==
As described in a film publication, Gloria Swann is driving Judge Malvin's automobile when she nearly runs down Larry Gibson, a blind soldier in a wheelchair. The two meet often thereafter, with Gloria reading to him and taking him on wheelchair outings. Gloria falls in love with him. Judge Malvin, who loves Gloria, tries to dissuade her, calling the soldier a "blind wreck." When Larry's finances get low, Gloria takes some songs he has written to a music publisher, and, being a cabaret singer, performs them at the Palm Garden club. The songs are a hit, and Larry signs a contract with the publisher. Instead of a mansion with the judge, Gloria ends up living in a boarding house with Larry, but they are happy. Larry is reconciled to the loss of his sight, for he sees through "the eyes of his soul."

== Cast ==
- Elsie Ferguson as Gloria Swann
- D.J. Flanagan as Teddy Safford
- Wyndham Standing as Larry Gibson
- George Backus as Judge Malvin
- G. Durpee as Monsier Moonlight
- Cora Williams as Landlady
- Charles W. Charles as Valet
