= Alois Reiser =

American classical composer

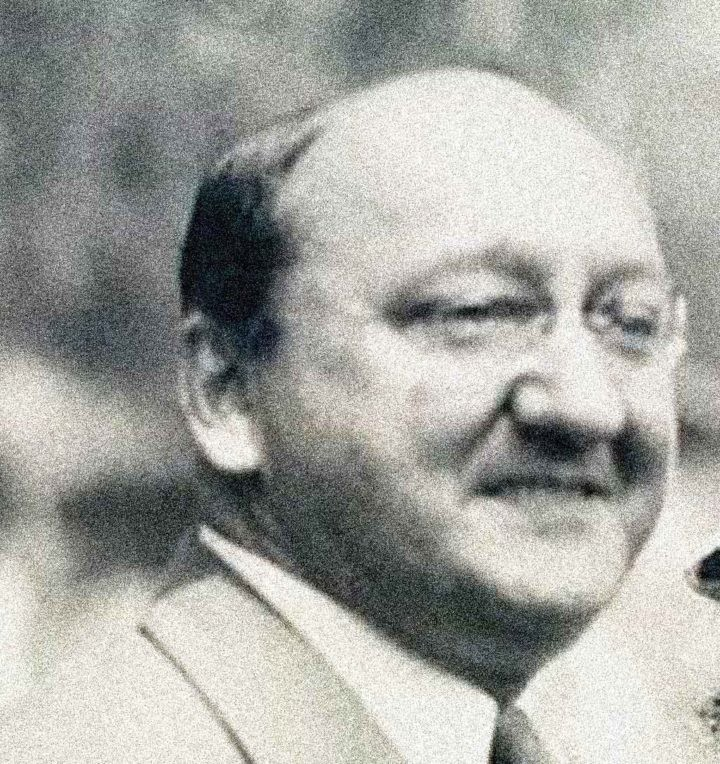
- Reiser, c. 1936
- Born: April 6, 1887; Prague, Czech Republic
- Died: April 4, 1977 (aged 89); Los Angeles, California, U.S.
- Occupations: Cellist, composer

Alois Reiser (April 6, 1887 – April 4, 1977) was a Czech-born American cellist and composer.

Reiser studied with Dvorak at the Prague Conservatory, and received a doctorate in music from the University of Prague. He toured Europe as cellist in the Bohemian Trio. He came to the United States in 1905, where he played cello for the Pittsburgh and New York Symphony orchestras.

He returned to Prague, conducting at the Prague Opera House until 1918. He then returned to New York and conducted at the Strand Theater. In 1927 he replaced Nathaniel Shilkret; he was assistant conductor until 1928; upon Jacques Gruenberg's resignation he became principal conductor. His first engagement as principal was to conduct the music for the premiere of Charlie Chaplin's film The Circus.

In 1929 he moved to Hollywood to direct and compose music for film studios.

He was the initial music director of the Los Angeles opera department of the Federal Music Project; performing Les Contes d'Hoffman. Other productions were planned but the department eventually failed under the leadership of Max Rabinoff.

He composed a number of works for orchestra, including two tone poems and two cello concertos; he also wrote chamber music, including string quartets, and the opera Gobi.

He died in Los Angeles.

== Selected filmography ==
- Hard to Get (1929)
- The Hottentot (1929)
- Her Private Life (1929)
- The Isle of Lost Ships (1929)
- The Lady Who Dared (1931)
