= The Avalanche (1919 film) =

1919 film by George Fitzmaurice

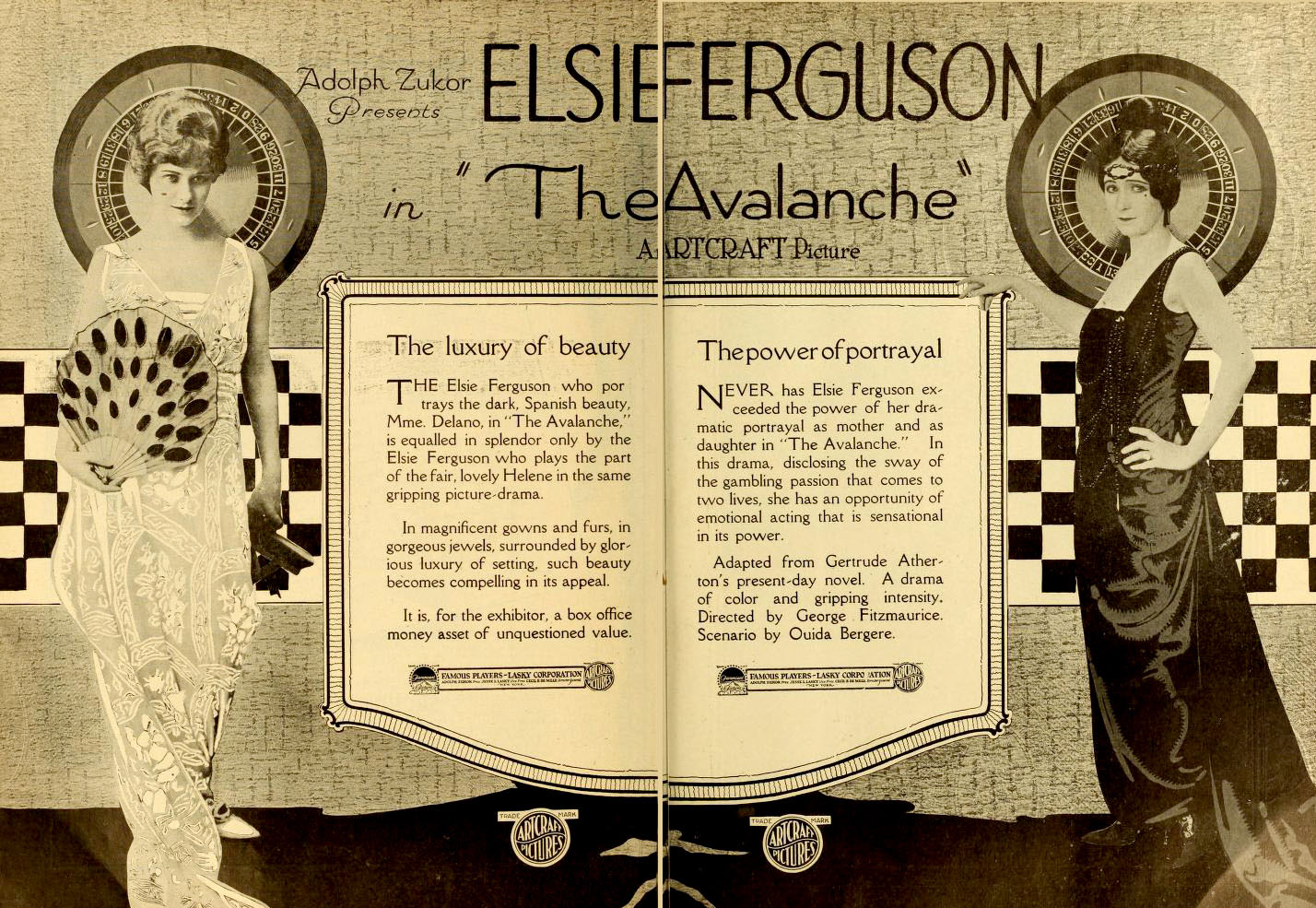
- Newspaper advertisement (1919)
- Directed by: George Fitzmaurice
- Written by: Ouida Bergere (scenario)
- Based on: The Avalanche: A Mystery Story by Gertrude Atherton
- Produced by: Adolph Zukor; Jesse L. Lasky
- Starring: Elsie Ferguson; Lumsden Hare; Warner Oland; Zeffie Tilbury
- Cinematography: Arthur C. Miller
- Production company: Famous Players–Lasky / Artcraft
- Distributed by: Paramount Pictures
- Release date: June 22, 1919
- Running time: 50+ minutes (5 reels at 5,273 ft)
- Country: United States
- Language: Silent (English intertitles)

The Avalanche is a 1919 American silent drama film about gambling directed by George Fitzmaurice who also served as the film's art director. William Scully was the assistant director to Fitzmaurice. The film stars Elsie Ferguson and Warner Oland. Ferguson plays a dual role in the film, portraying both mother and daughter. The movie is based on the 1919 novel, The Avalanche; a Mystery Story, by Gertrude Atherton.

This is the first film that teamed director Fitzmaurice and star Ferguson. Some scenes were filmed in Lake Placid, New York. Ferguson's gowns were by the designer Callot Soeurs.

== Plot ==
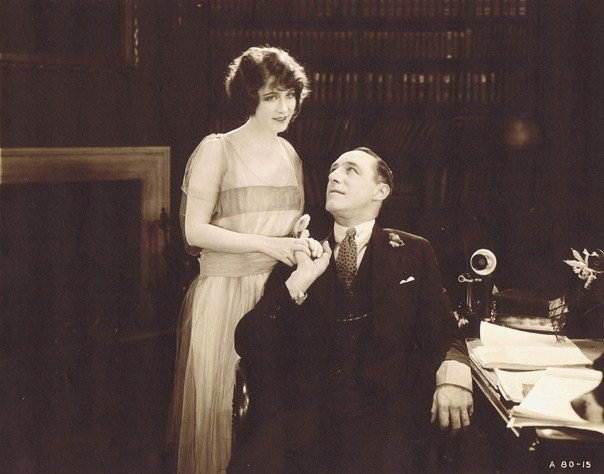
Elsie Ferguson and Lumsden Hare in The Avalanche

After her father, the owner of a gambling house in Spain, is murdered and her husband, a hardened gambler, commits suicide, Chichita takes her little girl and abandons her in a convent. There, little Helene will be raised by the nuns until, fifteen years later, now grown up, the adult escapes.

She meets and marries novelist Price Ruyler. Soon domestic life bores the young bride who, in New York City, becomes fascinated by nightlife and gambling. One of the gambling saloons she frequents belongs to Nick Delano, Chichita's second husband. Helene, addicted to gambling, suffers heavy losses. She tries to cover them with her jewelry, even stealing money from her husband's wallet, but gets in over her head.

Her mother, who has recognized her, wants to help her but Delano, discovering the bond between the two women, telephones Price. Helene struggles with Delano, who accidentally falls from the balcony and dies. To protect her daughter, Mrs. Delano blames herself for her husband's death and, in prison, poisons herself.

Years later, sitting in front of a burning fireplace, Helene quietly embroiders while Price embraces her affectionately.

== Cast ==
- Elsie Ferguson as Chichita / Madame Delano / Helene
- Lumsden Hare as Price Ruyler
- Zeffie Tilbury as Mrs Ruyler
- Fred Esmelton as John Harvey
- William Roselle as Ferdie Derenforth
- Grace Field as Sybil Price
- Warner Oland as Nick Delano

== Preservation ==
With no prints of The Avalanche located in any film archives, it is considered a lost film. In February 2021, the film was cited by the National Film Preservation Board on their Lost U.S. Silent Feature Films list.

== See also ==
- List of lost films
- The House That Shadows Built, 1931 Paramount promotional film. A possibility that the Elsie Ferguson clip shown is from The Avalanche.
