= Hard to Get (1929 film) =

1929 film

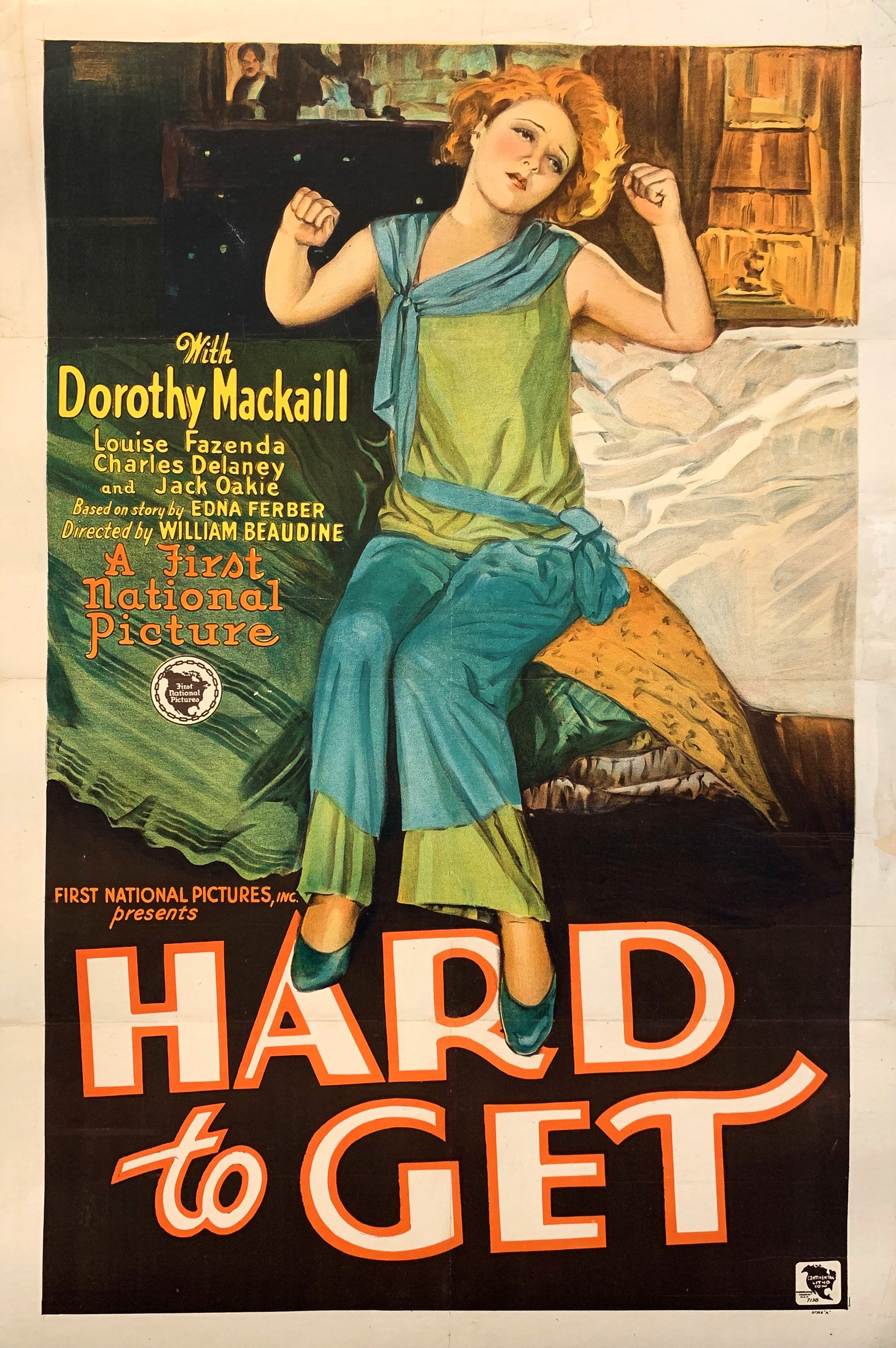
- Theatrical release poster
- Directed by: William Beaudine
- Screenplay by: Screenplay & titles: James Gruen; Richard Weil
- Based on: Classified; 1927 short story from Mother Knows Best by Edna Ferber
- Produced by: Ray Rockett
- Starring: Dorothy Mackaill; Charles Delaney; James Finlayson; Louise Fazenda
- Cinematography: John F. Seitz
- Edited by: Stuart Heisler
- Music by: Alois Reiser
- Production company: First National Pictures
- Distributed by: Warner Bros. Pictures
- Release date: August 4, 1929
- Running time: 80 minutes
- Country: United States
- Language: English

Hard to Get is a 1929 American pre-Code comedy sound film with a synchronized musical score and sound effects, directed by William Beaudine and starring Dorothy Mackaill, Charles Delaney and James Finlayson.

Hard to Get earned approximately $167,000 domestically in the box office.

== Plot ==
A dress shop employee falls in love with a millionaire, but when presented with the opportunity for marriage, she has conflictions over if the millionaire will ever accept her for who she truly is.

== Cast ==
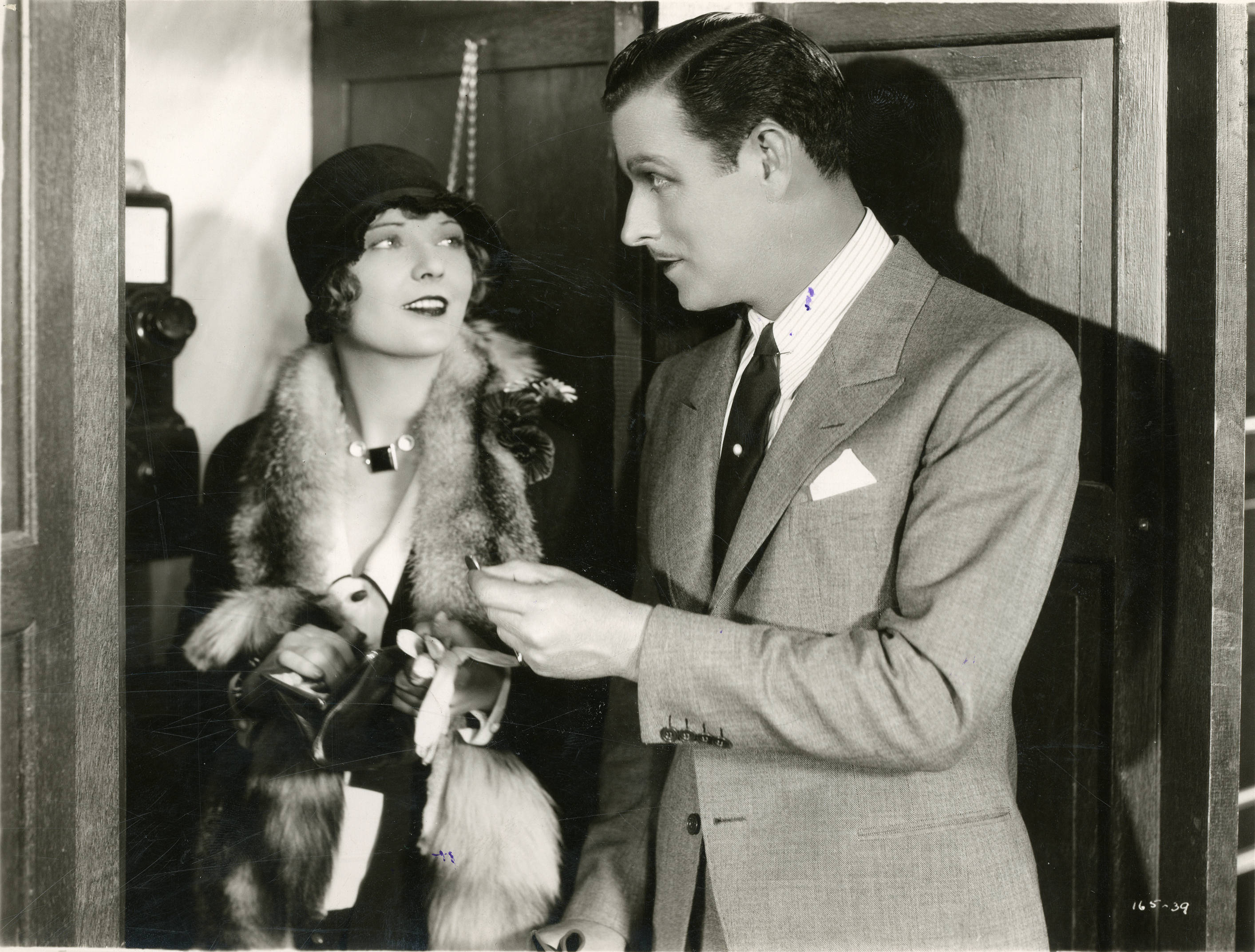
Dorothy Mackaill and Edmund Burns in Hard to Get

- Dorothy Mackaill as Bobby Martin
- Charles Delaney as Jerry Dillon
- James Finlayson as Pa Martin
- Louise Fazenda as Ma Martin
- Jack Oakie as Marty Martin
- Edmund Burns as Dexter Courtland
- Clarissa Selwynne as Mrs. Cortland

== Music ==
The film featured a theme song entitled "Things We Want Most Are Hard to Get" which was composed by Al Bryan, John McLaughlin and George W. Meyer.

== Preservation ==
The film from Hard to Get has no known surviving copies, making it considered a lost film. 72 minutes of Vitaphone disks for the Spanish international release are extant, providing the full score.

== See also ==
- List of early sound feature films (1926–1929)
- Classified (1925)
