= A Society Exile =

1919 film by George Fitzmaurice

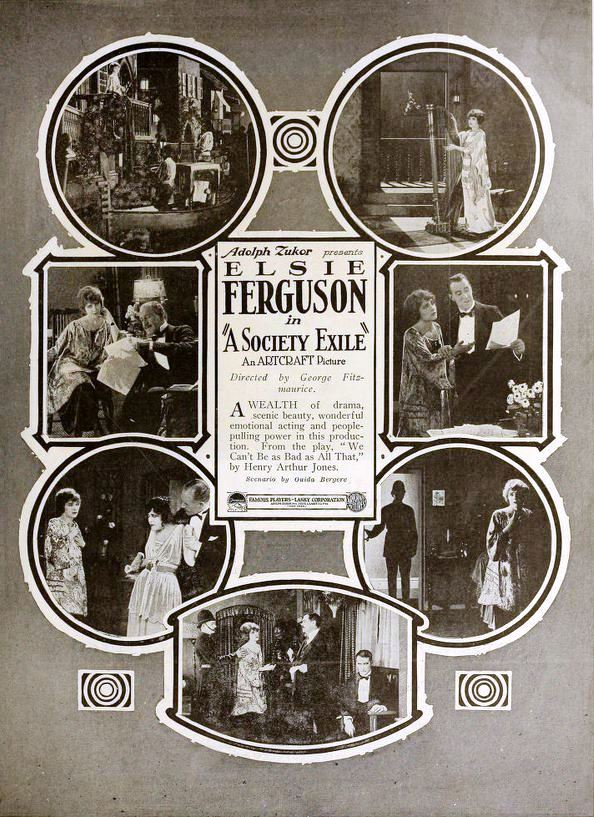
- Ad for the film from a 1919 issue of Motion Picture News
- Directed by: George Fitzmaurice
- Written by: Ouida Bergère
- Based on: We Can't Be as Bad as All That by Henry Arthur Jones
- Produced by: Adolph Zukor; Jesse L. Lasky
- Starring: Elsie Ferguson; Julia Dean; Zeffie Tilbury; Henry Stephenson
- Cinematography: Arthur C. Miller
- Production company: Famous Players–Lasky / Artcraft
- Distributed by: Paramount Pictures
- Release date: August 17, 1919
- Running time: 6 reels
- Country: United States
- Language: Silent (English intertitles)

A Society Exile is a 1919 American silent drama film directed by George Fitzmaurice and starring Elsie Ferguson, Julia Dean, and William Carleton. The assistant director to Fitzmaurice was William Scully. The film was based upon the 1910 play We Can't Be as Bad as All That by Henry Arthur Jones, adapted for the screen by Ouida Bergère. The film marks the second screen appearance of the actor Henry Stephenson.

According to the American Film Institute catalog, William Cameron Menzies may or may not have been the art director for the film.

== Plot ==
Based upon a plot summary included in a film review in a film publication, Nora is an American heiress who is courted by Lord Bissett while visiting England. She overhears Bissett discussing with his sister the need of Nora's money to replenish his fortune, so she leaves him and moves into a nearby cottage. A successful playwright Sir Howard Furnival assists her in preparing a play based upon a novel she has written, but keeps this secret from his wife Doris, who is very jealous. Bissett obtains a page of the manuscript in Nora's handwriting with enduring terms, and gives it to Doris, telling her that it is a love letter to her husband. This leads to the deaths of both Furnivals, and Nora is blamed and ostracized. Nora changes her name and goes to Venice, where she meets and becomes engaged to English army officer Sir Ralph Newell. Before their marriage she confesses who she is in a letter that he never receives. Upon return to England, she discovers that her husband is the brother of Doris and has cursed the woman who caused his sister's death. Bissett reveals to Newell who Nora is. In the end after more melodrama, the lovers are reunited in Venice.

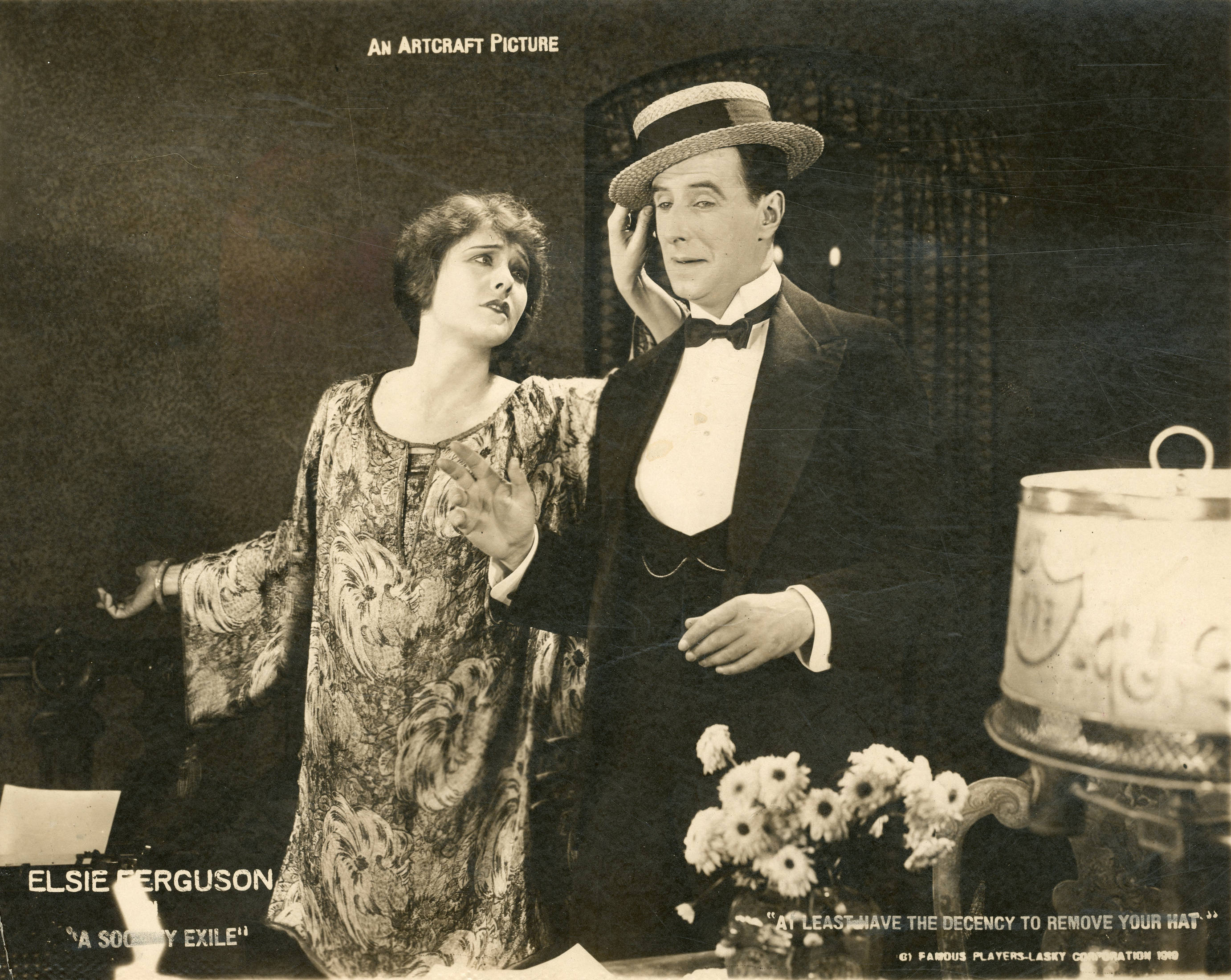
Film still; Elsie Ferguson and Warburton Gamble.

== Cast ==
- Elsie Ferguson as Nora Shard
- William P. Carleton as Sir Ralph Newell
- Warburton Gamble as Lord Bissett
- Julia Dean as Lady Doris Furnival
- Henry Stephenson as Sir Howard Furnival
- Zeffie Tilbury as Mrs. Stanley Shelby
- Bijou Fernandez as Lady Carnforth
- Alexander Kyle as Lord Carnforth

== Preservation ==
With no prints of A Society Exile located in any film archives, it is considered a lost film. In February 2021, the film was cited by the National Film Preservation Board on their Lost U.S. Silent Feature Films list.

== See also ==
- List of lost films
