= The Danger Mark =

- Directed by: Hugh Ford
- Written by: Charles Maigne (scenario)
- Based on: The Danger Mark by Robert W. Chambers
- Produced by: Adolph Zukor; Jesse Lasky
- Starring: Elsie Ferguson; Mahlon Hamilton
- Cinematography: William Marshall
- Distributed by: Paramount Pictures
- Release date: July 7, 1918
- Running time: 50 minutes; 5 reels
- Country: United States
- Language: Silent (English intertitles)

The Danger Mark is a lost 1918 American silent drama film directed by Hugh Ford and starring Elsie Ferguson. It was produced by Famous Players–Lasky, and distributed by Paramount Pictures. It is based on a play by Robert W. Chambers. Prior to the film's release, the play was published in "serial form and later issued as a book."

== Plot ==
As described in a film magazine, Geraldine Seagrave, addicted to the drinking habit, becomes intoxicated the night of her debut and later, because of this condition, refuses the love of Duane Mallett. Jack Dysart, eager to recuperate his fallen fortunes, endeavors to win Geraldine but she, after learning that Duane's sister Sylvia loves Jack, cleverly arranges it so that Sylvia and Jack become engaged and then married. Duane, after finally persuades Geraldine to become engaged to him, comes to believe that she has been false and leaves a note stating that he will never return. The craving for alcohol almost overwhelms Geraldine but she fights it off, and when Duane learns the true state of affairs he returns and Duane and Geraldine are reunited.

== Cast ==
- Elsie Ferguson as Geraldine Seagrave
- Mahlon Hamilton as Duane Mallett
- Crauford Kent as Jack Dysart
- Gertrude McCoy as Sylvia Mallett
- Edmund Burns as Scott Seagrave (as Edward Burns)
- Maude Turner Gordon as Kathleen Severn
- William T. Carleton as Colonel Mallett

== Preservation ==
With no holdings located in archives, The Danger Mark is considered a lost film.
