= The Marriage Price =

1919 film by Emile Chautard

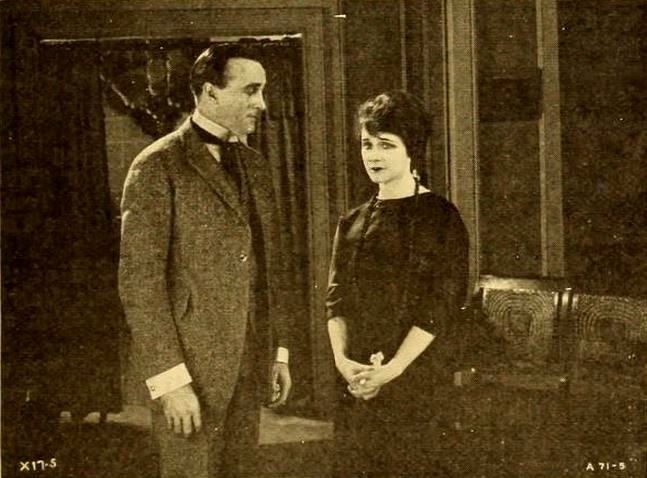
- Still with Standing and Ferguson
- Directed by: Emile Chautard
- Written by: Griswold Wheeler (story: For Sale); Eve Unsell (scenario)
- Produced by: Adolph Zukor; Jesse Lasky
- Starring: Elsie Ferguson
- Cinematography: Jacques Bizeul (fr)
- Distributed by: Paramount Pictures / Artcraft
- Release date: March 16, 1919
- Running time: 5 reels
- Country: United States
- Language: Silent (English intertitles)

The Marriage Price is a 1919 American silent romantic drama film produced by Famous Players–Lasky and distributed through Paramount Pictures and Artcraft. Emile Chautard directed and Elsie Ferguson stars. This film is lost.

== Plot ==
As described in a film magazine, Helen Tremaine is an extravagant daughter of a wealthy New York man, but becomes impoverished by his death and disillusioned when her friends leave her, save Frederick Lawton, a man of power and wealth. She does not love Lawton and prefers Kenneth Gordon, but he says he is too poor to marry her. She attempts to support herself, but even fails at a job as a film actress. Nearly starving, she marries Lawton as a last resort. He tests her by making her financially independent through a pretend heritage of hers that he claims to have discovered, but she remains a girl of her word. All is well until her former love shows up to win her with a scheme that will enrich him while ruining her husband. The deal goes through, but it is a trap set up by her husband to show her the type of man her former love was. She now sees the nobility in her husband with happy results.

== Cast ==
- Elsie Ferguson as Helen Tremaine
- Wyndham Standing as Frederick Lawton
- Lionel Atwill as Kenneth Gordon
- Robert Schable as Archie Van Orden
- Maud Hosford as Amelia Lawton
- Marie Temper as Evie Hitchens
- Clariette Anthony as The Other Woman
- Zelda Crosby as Undetermined Role
- Carrie Clark Ward as 'uncredited'
