= Lights of the Desert =

1922 film

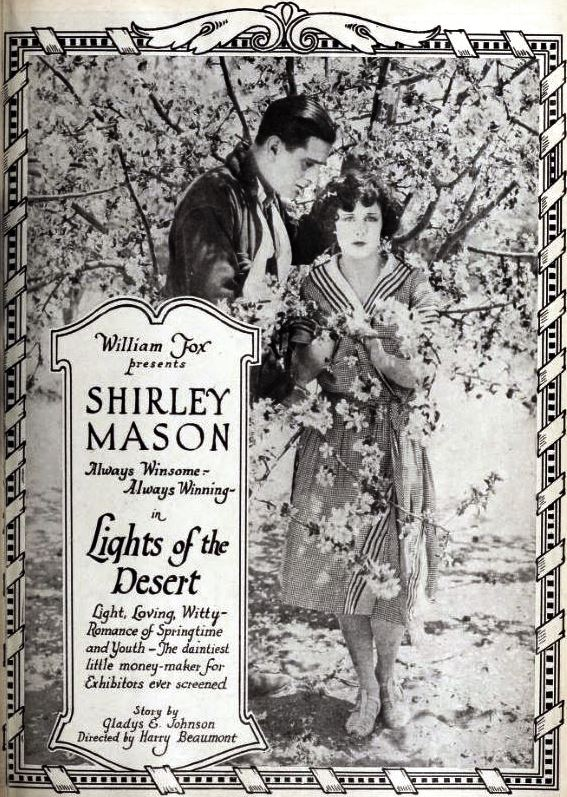
- Directed by: Harry Beaumont
- Written by: Gladys Johnson; Paul Schofield
- Produced by: William Fox
- Starring: Shirley Mason; Allan Forrest; Edmund Burns
- Cinematography: Frank B. Good
- Production company: Fox Film
- Distributed by: Fox Film
- Release date: June 11, 1922
- Running time: 50 minutes
- Country: United States
- Languages: Silent; English intertitles

Lights of the Desert is a 1922 American silent Western film directed by Harry Beaumont and starring Shirley Mason, Allan Forrest and Edmund Burns.

When her theatrical troupe is stranded in Nevada, a young woman remains in the area where she falls in love with an oil well owner.

== Cast ==
- Shirley Mason as Yvonne Laraby
- Allan Forrest as Clay Truxall
- Edmund Burns as Andrew Reed
- Jim Mason as Slim Saunders
- Andrée Tourneur as Marie Curtis
- Josephine Crowell as Ma Curtis
- Lillian Langdon as Susan Gallant

== Bibliography ==
- James Robert Parish & Michael R. Pitts. Film directors: a guide to their American films. Scarecrow Press, 1974.
