= Footlights (film) =

1921 film

- Surviving film poster
- Directed by: John S. Robertson
- Written by: Rita Weiman (story); Josephine Lovett (scenario)
- Produced by: Famous Players–Lasky
- Starring: Elsie Ferguson; Reginald Denny; Marc McDermott
- Cinematography: Roy Overbaugh
- Distributed by: Paramount Pictures
- Release date: September 1, 1921
- Running time: 70+ minutes at (7078 feet)
- Country: United States
- Language: Silent (English intertitles)

Footlights is a 1921 American silent romantic drama directed by John S. Robertson. It stars Elsie Ferguson and Reginald Denny as the lead characters. The film marked the only time star Ferguson and director Robertson worked together on a picture.

== Cast ==
- Elsie Ferguson as Lisa Parsinova / Lizzie Parsons
- Reginald Denny as Brett Page
- Marc McDermott as Oswald Kane
- Octavia Handworth as Etta

== Survival status ==
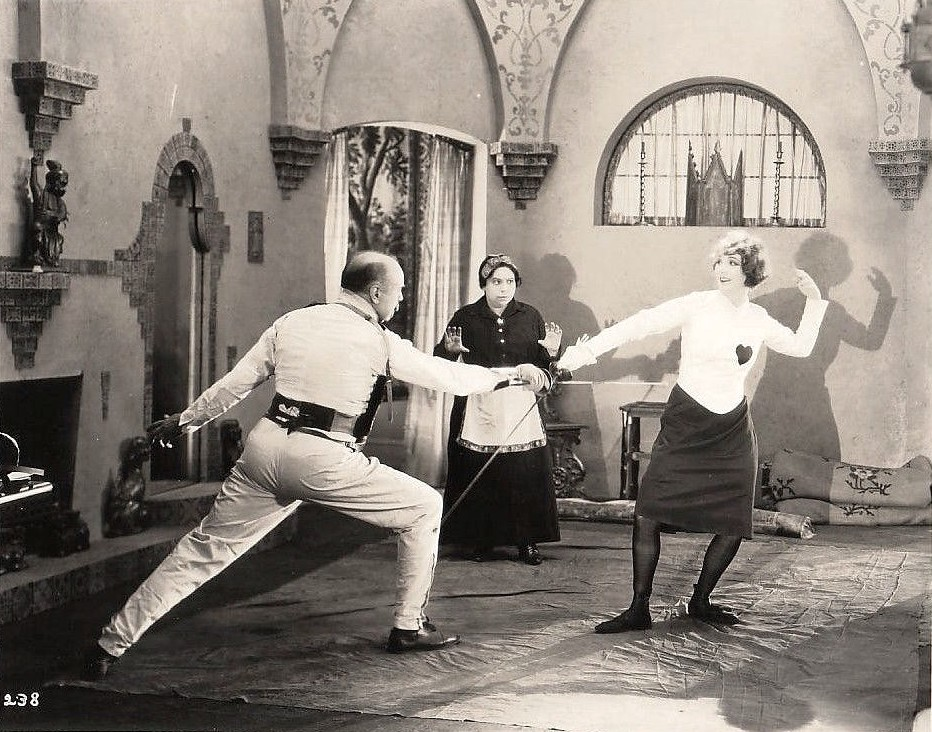
Prepping for scene, director John Robertson spars with Elsie Ferguson.

This romantic adventure cannot be assessed today as Footlights is presumably a lost film with no prints known to exist. It was later remade in 1927 as The Spotlight, a vehicle for Esther Ralston. That film is lost as well.
