= Under the Greenwood Tree (1918 film) =

1918 silent film by Emile Chautard

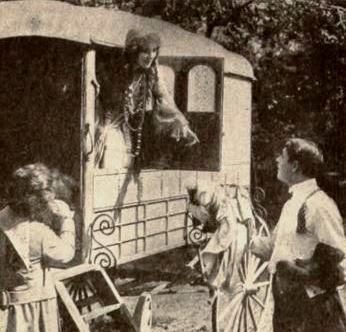
- Film still
- Directed by: Emile Chautard
- Written by: Adrian Gil-Spear (scenario)
- Based on: Under the Greenwood Tree by Henry V. Esmond
- Produced by: Famous Players–Lasky
- Starring: Elsie Ferguson; Eugene O'Brien
- Cinematography: Jacques Bizeul (fr)
- Distributed by: Paramount Pictures
- Release date: December 8, 1918
- Running time: 50+ minutes at 5 reels (4,543 ft)
- Country: United States
- Language: Silent (English intertitles)

Under the Greenwood Tree is a 1918 American silent drama film directed by Emile Chautard and starring Elsie Ferguson. The movie was based on a play by Henry V. Esmond. An unrelated British film with this title based on the Thomas Hardy novel Under the Greenwood Tree was made in 1929. The film possibly has a scene where Ferguson swims in the nude in a pond. The title refers to a line in William Shakespeare's play As You Like It (Act II, Scene V). It is classified as being a lost film.

== Plot ==
Mary Hamilton an heiress tires of fortune hunting men and takes her secretary Peggy to join a group of gypsies undercover. As the women head into the woods Sir Kenneth one of Mary's close male friends follows them dressed as a gypsy. Jack Hutton a wealthy landowner wants the gypsies off his land and has Sir Kenneth jailed. Hutton then seeks out Mary's camp, not knowing her true identity, and wants her thrown off the land as well but then catches her swimming in a moonlit pond. Hutton falls in love with Mary and Mary asks him to dine. When Hutton leaves a band of gypsies attacks Mary's wagon and tie her up. Jack then tries to rescue Mary but is beaten by the gypsies. Sir Kenneth has by then been released from jail and arrives with Peggy, the two of them are now in love. After they cut Mary loose, Sir Kenneth and Peggy head off to be married leaving Mary to care for Hutton. As Hutton recuperates Mary tells him the truth that she is an heiress and not a gypsy as she had led Hutton to believe. They are later married.

The poor in the film, as represented by the lazy gypsies who rob Mary, do not compare well to the heroic but naive members of the upper class.

== Cast ==
- Elsie Ferguson as Mary Hamilton
- Eugene O'Brien as Jack Hutton
- Edmund Burns as Sir Kenneth Graham (*as Edward Burns)
- Mildred Havens as Peggy Ingledew
- John Ardizoni as Karl
- Robert Milasch as Pete
- Robert Vivian as Griggs
- Charles Craig as Hurrell Hutton
- Henry Warwick as Earl of Hexham
- James A. Furey as Sinclair
