= The Lie (1918 film) =

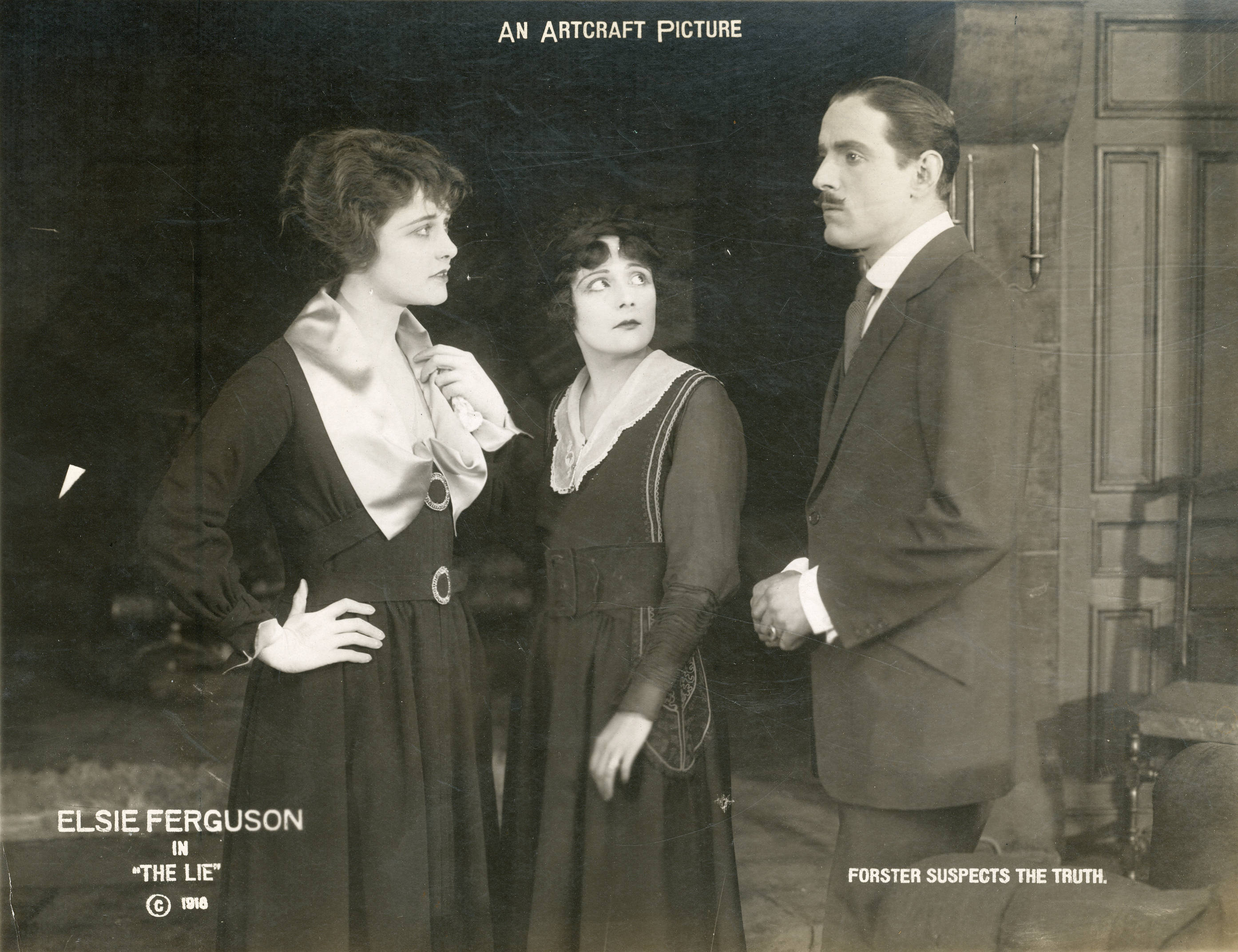
- Still with Elsie Ferguson, Betty Howe, and David Powell
- Directed by: J. Searle Dawley
- Written by: Charles Maigne (scenario)
- Based on: The Lie by Henry Arthur Jones
- Produced by: Adolph Zukor
- Starring: Elsie Ferguson
- Cinematography: H. Lyman Broening
- Distributed by: Artcraft Pictures
- Release date: April 14, 1918
- Running time: 5 reels
- Country: United States
- Language: Silent (English intertitles)

The Lie is a 1918 American silent drama film produced by Famous Players–Lasky and distributed by Artcraft Pictures, an affiliate of Paramount. J. Searle Dawley directed and stage star Elsie Ferguson starred in a story based on a 1914 play by Henry Arthur Jones and starring Margaret Illington. The film is now lost.

== Cast ==
- Elsie Ferguson as Elinor Shale
- David Powell as Gerald Forster
- John L. Shine as Sir Robert Shale
- Percy Marmont as Nol Dibdin
- Charles Sutton as Hamp
- Bertha Kent as Gibbard
- Maude Turner Gordon as Lady Beachworth
- Betty Howe as Lucy Shale

== Reception ==
Like many American films of the time, The Lie was subject to cuts by city and state film censorship boards. For example, the Chicago Board of Censors issued an Adults Only permit for the film.

== See also ==
- The House That Shadows Built (1931 promotional film by Paramount); a possibility that the unnamed Ferguson clip is from The Lie.
