= Elsie Ferguson =

American actress (1883–1961)

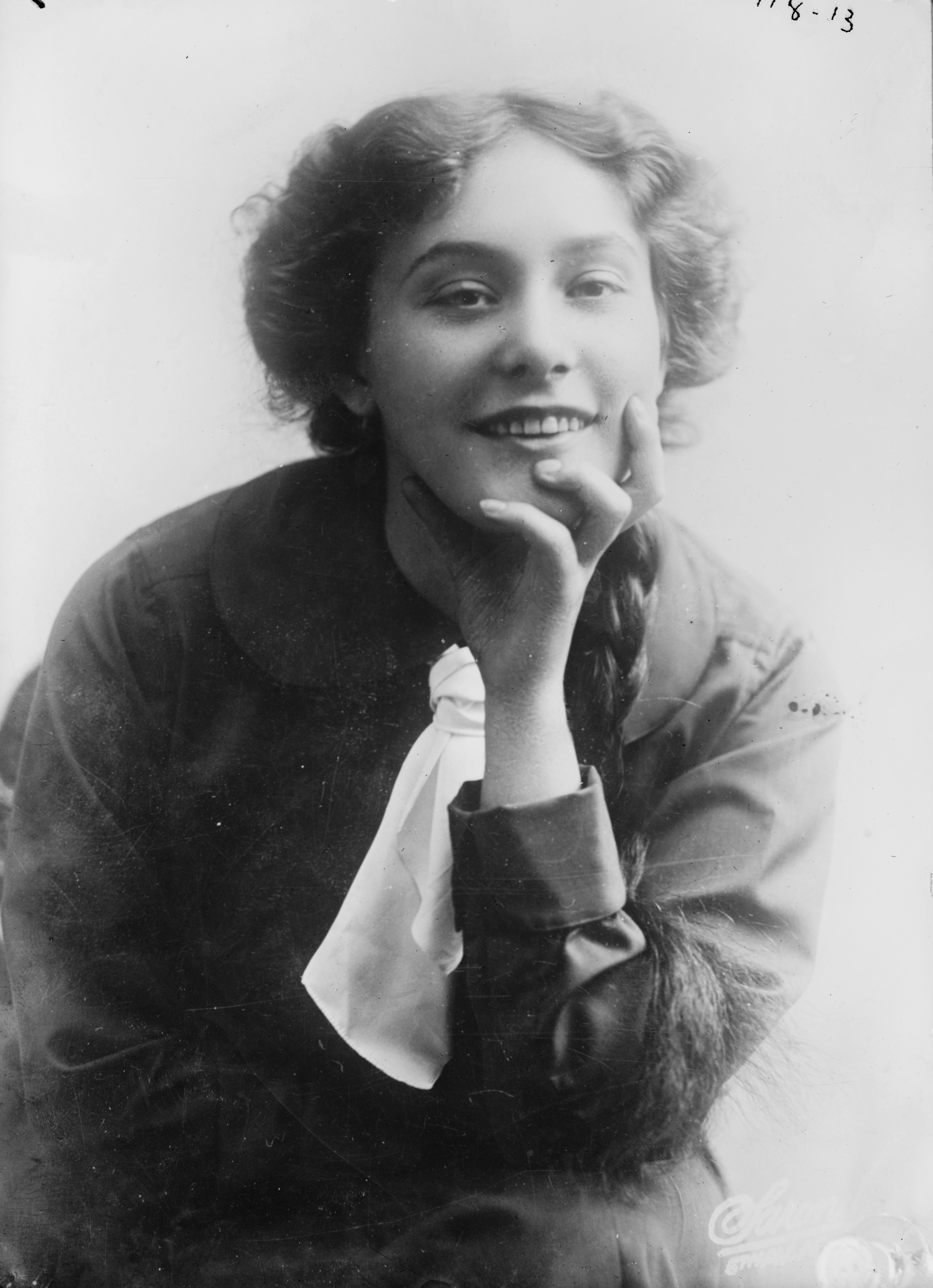
- Publicity photo of Ferguson (1913)
- Born: August 19, 1883; New York City, U.S.
- Died: November 15, 1961 (aged 78); New London, Connecticut, U.S.
- Occupation: Actress
- Years active: 1902–1943
- Spouse(s): Frederick C. Hoey (1907-1914) (divorced); Thomas Clarke, Jr. (1916-1923) (divorced); Frederick Worlock (1924–1930) (divorced); Victor Augustus Seymour Egan (1934–1956) (his death)

Elsie Louise Ferguson (August 19, 1883 – November 15, 1961) was an American stage and film actress. Seen by some as an early feminist, she promoted suffrage, which she discussed in interviews, and supported animal rights.

== Early life ==
Born in New York City, Elsie Ferguson was the child of Hiram and Amelia Ferguson; her father was a successful attorney. Raised and educated in Manhattan, she became interested in the theater at a young age and made her stage debut at 17 as a chorus girl in a musical comedy. For almost two years, from 1903 to 1905, she was a cast member in The Girl from Kays. In 1908, she was leading lady to Edgar Selwyn in Pierre of the Plains. By 1909, after several years apprenticeship under several producers, including Charles Frohman, Klaw & Erlanger, Charles Dillingham and Henry B. Harris, she was a major Broadway star, starring in Such a Little Queen. In 1910, she spent time on the stage in London. Actresses Evelyn Nesbit and Ethel Barrymore were friends of hers.

== Stardom ==
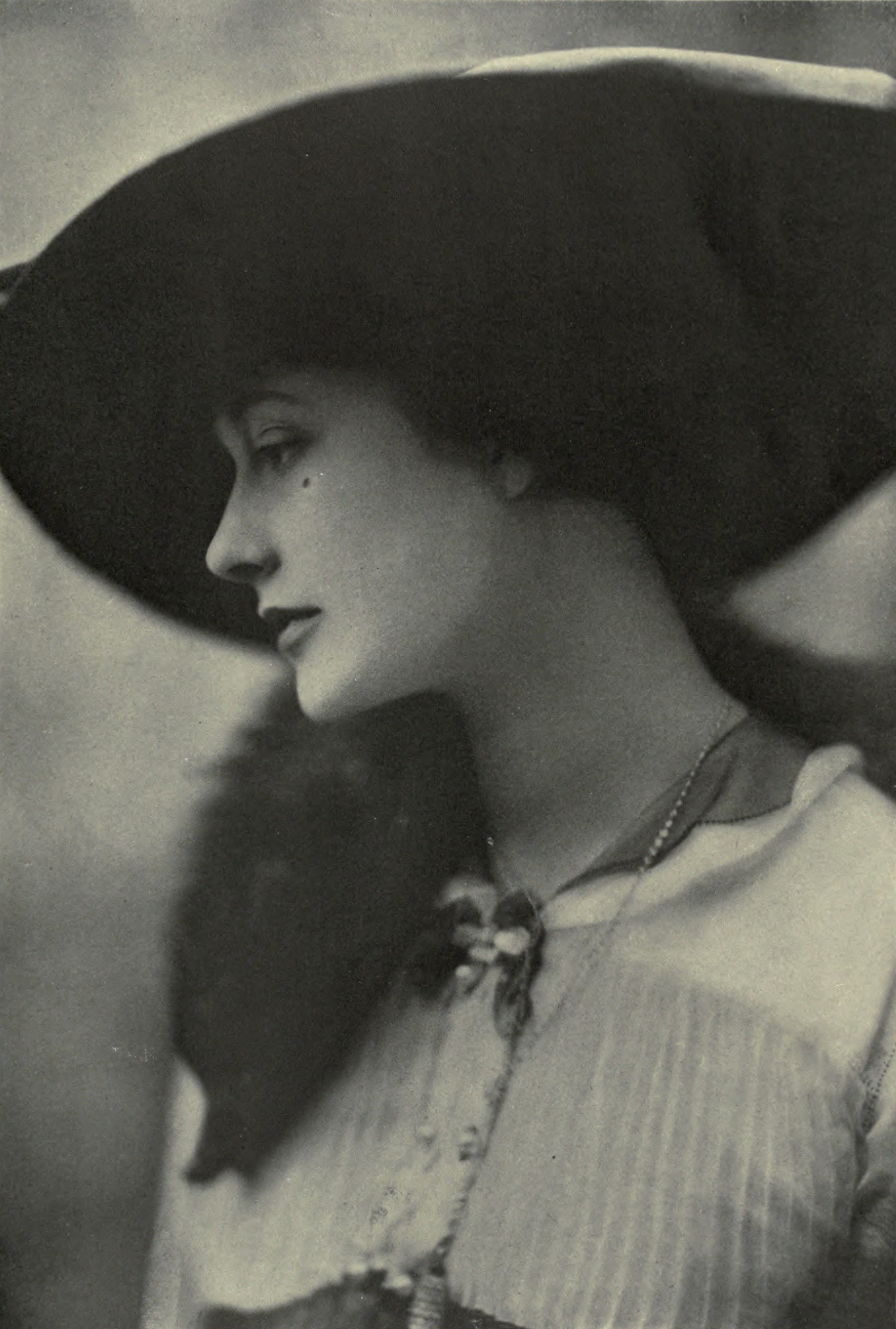
The Theatre pub. 1913

At the peak of her popularity, several film studios offered her a contract but she declined them all until widely respected New York-based French director Maurice Tourneur proposed she appear in the lead role as a sophisticated patrician in his 1917 silent film Barbary Sheep. She also may have consented to films because she no longer had the protection of her Broadway employers Henry B. Harris, who died on the Titanic in 1912, and Charles Frohman, who perished on the Lusitania in 1915. Producer and director Adolph Zukor then signed her to an 18-film, three-year, $5,000-per-week contract.

Following this first film, Ferguson starred in two more films directed by Tourneur under a lucrative contract from Paramount Pictures that paid her $1,000 per day of filming in addition to her weekly contract income. Her only surviving complete silent film is The Witness for the Defense (1919), co-starring Warner Oland and performed as a play in 1911 by her friend Ethel Barrymore. A surviving fragment of footage of Ferguson from The Lie or The Avalanche can be seen in Paramount's The House That Shadows Built (1931). Other brief surviving footage of Ferguson is preserved in Paramount's A Trip to Paramountown (1922)

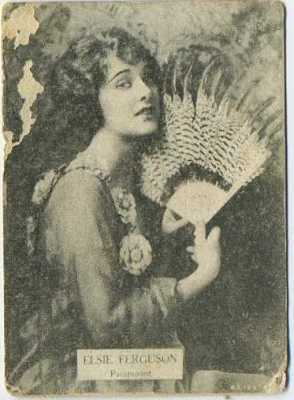
c. 1920

In 1921, she accepted another contract offer from Paramount Pictures to star in four films to be spread over a two-year period. One of these was the 1921 film entitled Forever in which she starred with Wallace Reid.

== "Talkies" and retirement ==
Ferguson's last silent film before returning to Broadway was the 1925 drama The Unknown Lover. In 1930, she made her first sound film that also would be her final film, titled Scarlet Pages, which is now preserved in the Library of Congress. The film was based on a 1929 Broadway production of the same name that she also starred in. She was described as having a "pleasantly low-pitched voice with perfect diction."

Ferguson made her final appearance on Broadway in 1943, at the age of 60, that met with critical acclaim. She played in Outrageous Fortune, a play written by her neighbor Rose Franken.}

== Personal life and death ==
Ferguson was first married to professional baseball manager Fred Hoey, from 1907 until their divorce in 1914. She married Thomas Benedict Clarke, Jr. in 1916; they divorced in 1923. In 1924, in Great Neck, Long Island, she married fellow actor Frederick Worlock; they divorced in 1930. Her fourth and last husband was Victor A.S. Egan, whom she married in 1934; this marriage lasted until his death in 1956.

Ferguson died in Lawrence Memorial Hospital in New London, Connecticut, in 1961. She was interred in Duck River Cemetery in Old Lyme, Connecticut. A very wealthy woman with no heirs and a lover of animals, she left a large part of her considerable estate to a variety of charities, including several for animal welfare.

== Filmography ==
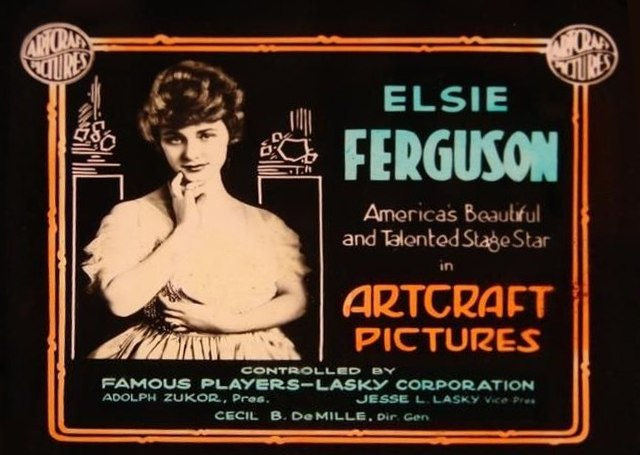
Paramount-Artcraft lantern slide announcing Ferguson as an Artcraft player.

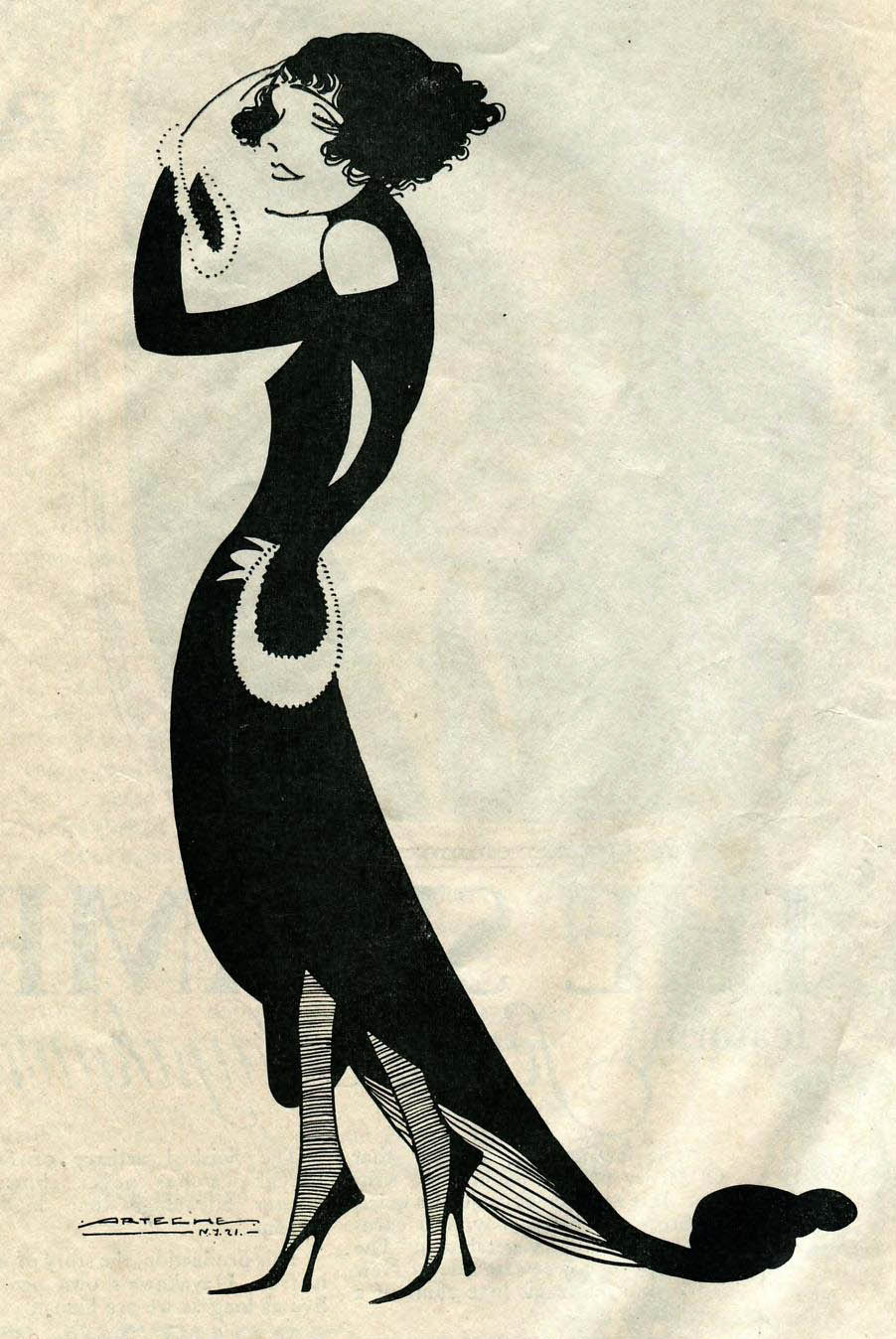
Elsie Ferguson in Footlights

Year	Title	Role	Notes
1902	Jack and the Beanstalk	Fairy	
1917	Barbary Sheep	Lady Katherine 'Kitty' Wyverne	Lost film Eight minutes survive
1917	The Rise of Jennie Cushing	Jenny Cushing	Lost film
1918	Rose of the World	Rosamond English	
1918	The Song of Songs	Lily Kardos	Lost film
1918	The Lie	Elinor Shale	Lost film
1918	A Doll's House	Nora Helmer	Lost film
1918	The Danger Mark	Geraldine Seagrave	Lost film
1918	Heart of the Wilds	Jen Galbraith	Lost film
1918	The Spirit That Wins	Elsie	Short; Lost film
1918	Under the Greenwood Tree	Mary Hamilton	Lost film
1919	His Parisian Wife	Fauvette	Lost film
1919	The Marriage Price	Helen Tremaine	Lost film
1919	Eyes of the Soul	Gloria Swann	Lost film
1919	The Avalanche	Chichita / Madame Delano / Helene	Lost film
1919	A Society Exile	Nora Shard, aka Christine	Lost film
1919	The Witness for the Defense	Stella Derrick	
1919	Counterfeit	Virginia Griswold	Lost film
1920	His House in Order	Nina Graham	Lost film
1920	Lady Rose's Daughter	Julie le Breton / Lady Rose / Lady Maude	Lost film
1921	Sacred and Profane Love	Carlotta Peel	Lost film
1921	Footlights	Lisa Parsinova / Lizzie Parsons	Lost film
1921	Forever	Mimsi	Lost film
1922	Outcast	Miriam	Lost film
1922	A Trip to Paramountown	Herself	Documentary short
1924	Broadway After Dark	Herself	Short; Lost film
1925	The Unknown Lover	Elaine Kent	Lost film
1930	Scarlet Pages	Mary Bancroft	
