= Second Childhood (film) =

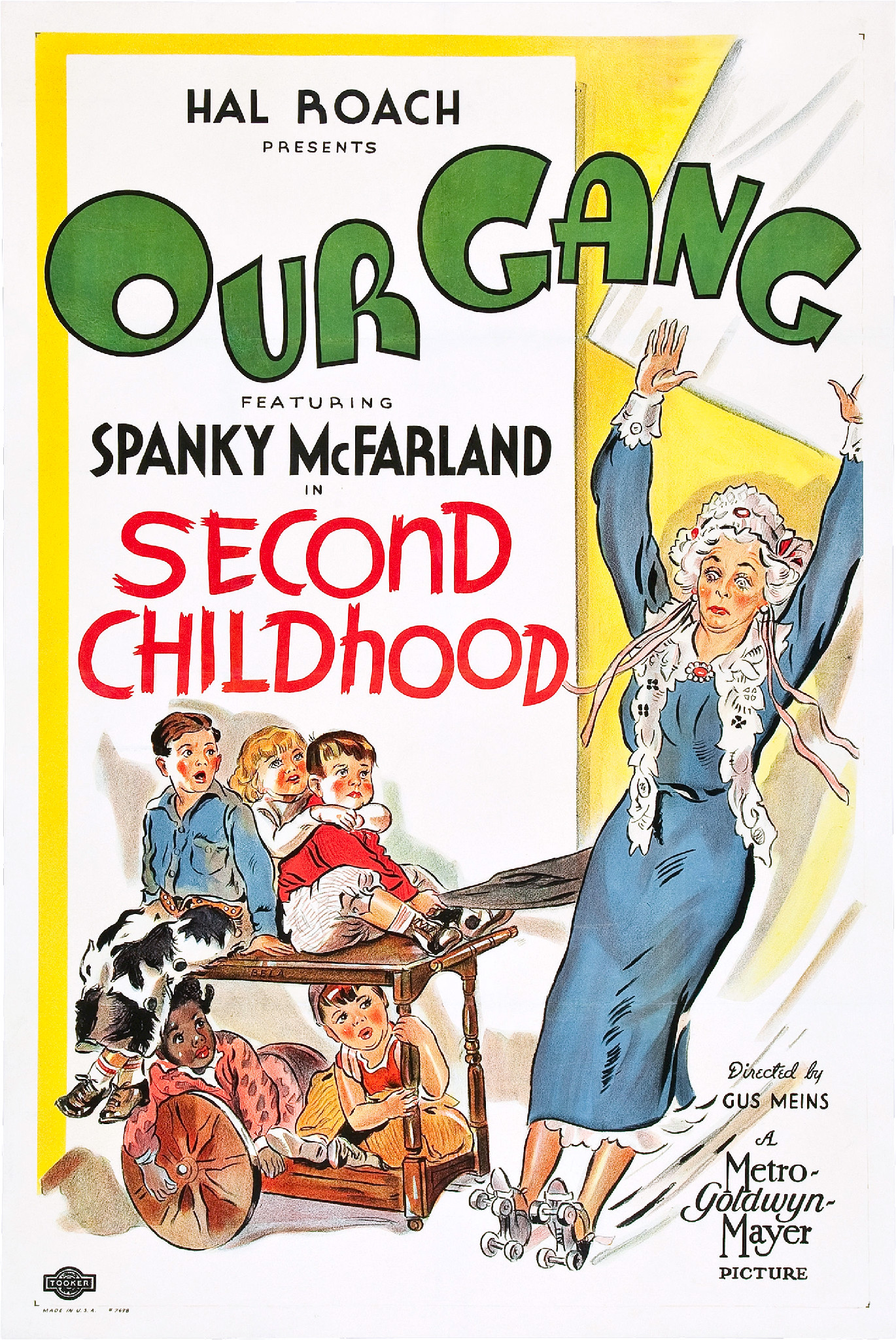
- Film poster
- Directed by: Gus Meins
- Produced by: Hal Roach
- Starring: George McFarland; Carl Switzer; Darla Hood; Billie Thomas; Eugene Lee
- Cinematography: Francis Corby
- Edited by: Louis McManus
- Music by: Leroy Shield
- Distributed by: Metro-Goldwyn-Mayer
- Release date: April 11, 1936
- Running time: 18' 57"
- Country: United States
- Language: English

Second Childhood is a 1936 Our Gang short comedy film directed by Gus Meins. It was the 144th Our Gang short to be released.

== Plot ==
On the occasion of her 65th birthday, a crotchety hypochondriac (Zeffie Tilbury) goes through her daily rant as her snooty servants ply her with colorful but unnecessary pills. Her "celebration" is interrupted when a toy plane owned by the gang crashes through her dining room window and shatters a vase. Forced to do the old lady's yardwork to pay for the damage, the kids ever so gradually win her heart, mostly by refusing to mollycoddle her as her servants have done for so many years.

Before long, the gang's new "Grandma" is singing along with Spanky and Alfalfa, demolishing her pill bottles with a slingshot, embarking upon a wild roller-skate ride through her drafty mansion—and having the time of her life in the process.

== Production notes ==
Unbeknownst to the cast, Zeffie Tilbury was blind. In between takes, she was led around by her staff. This would be the last episode directed by Gus Meins.

Second Childhood was partially remade as Kiddie Kure, featuring much of the same cast.

== Cast ==
=== The Gang ===
- Darla Hood as Darla
- Eugene Lee as Porky
- George McFarland as Spanky
- Carl Switzer as Alfalfa
- Billie Thomas as Buckwheat
- Dickie De Nuet as Our Gang member

=== Additional cast ===
- Sidney Bracey as Hobson, the butler
- Gretta Gould as Maid
- Zeffie Tilbury as Grandma

== See also ==
- Our Gang filmography
