= Zeffie Tilbury =

English-American actress (1863–1950)

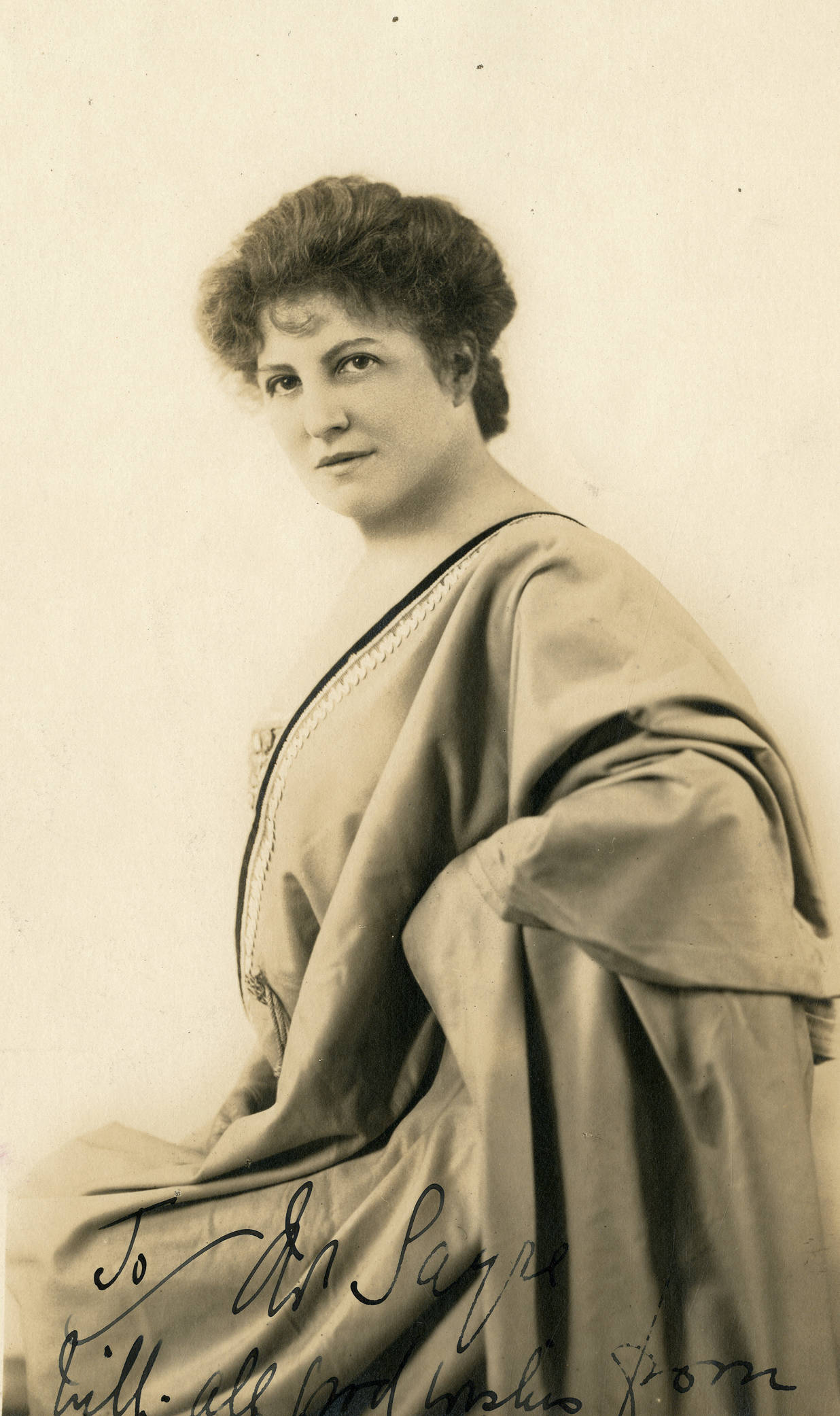
- Tilbury in 1913
- Born: Zeffie Agnes Lydia Tilbury; 20 November 1863; Paddington, Middlesex, England
- Died: 24 July 1950 (aged 86); Los Angeles, California, U.S.
- Resting place: Chapel of the Pines Crematory
- Occupation: Actress
- Years active: 1881–1942
- Spouses: Arthur Frederick Lewis (m. 1887; div. 19??); L. E. Woodthorpe (m. 1904; died 1915)
- Relatives: Clara T. Bracy (aunt); Sidney Bracey (cousin)

Zeffie Agnes Lydia Tilbury (20 November 1863 – 24 July 1950) was an English-American actress.

== Early years ==
Born in Paddington, Middlesex, England, Tilbury was the only child of the variety performer Lydia Thompson and John Christian Tilbury, a riding-master and "fashionable 'man about town'" from a comfortably wealthy background, his grandfather, of the Tilbury family firm of London coachbuilders, having created the Tilbury carriage. Her father died aged 26 in 1864; having borrowed an inexperienced horse, "All Fours", to participate in the South Essex Steeplechase at Brentwood, Essex, he was crushed by the horse when it failed to clear a fence and rolled on him. Although he didn't appear badly injured, his skull was fractured and he had suffered severe internal injuries, which caused his death the next day.

== Career ==
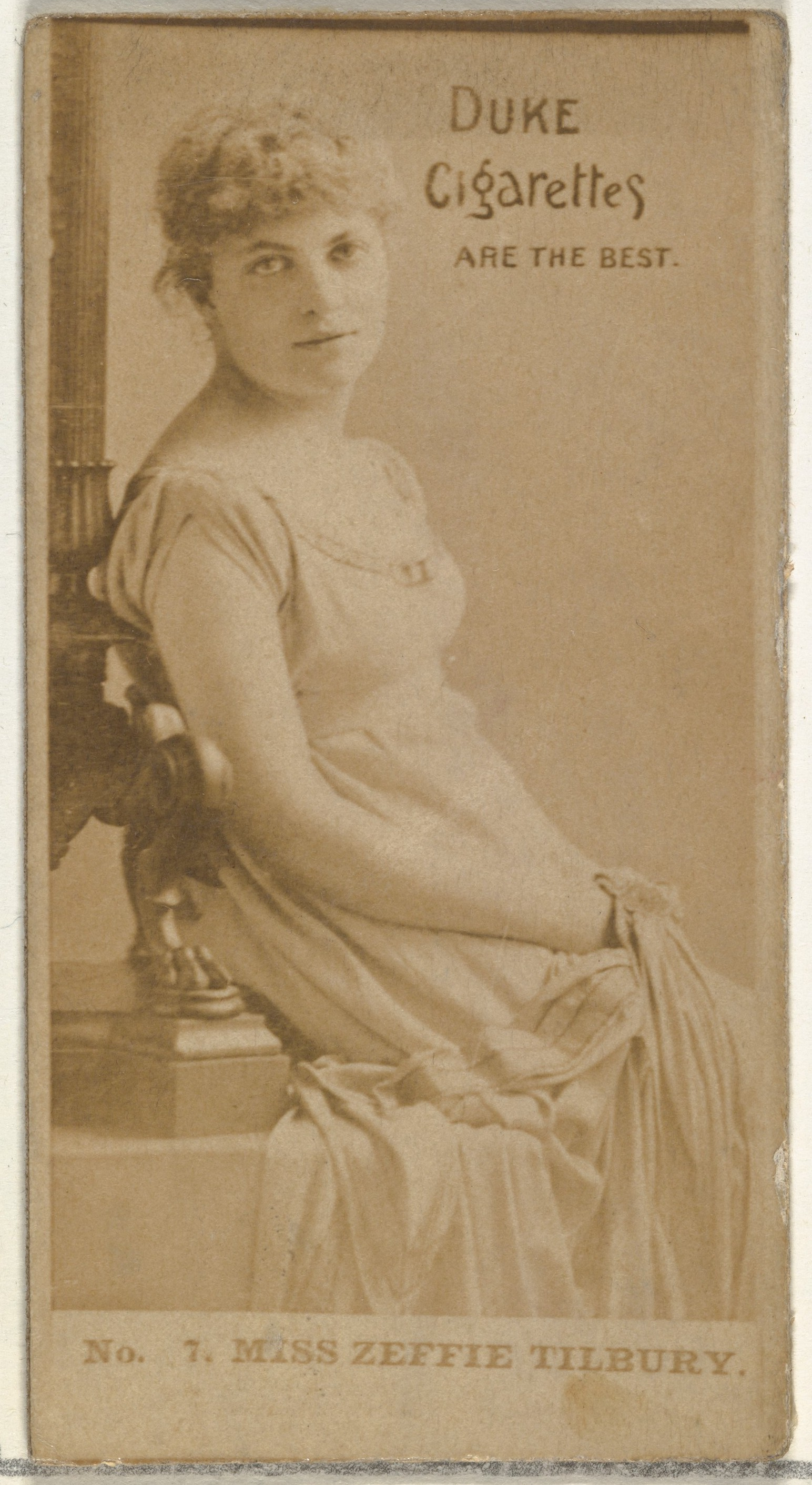
Cigarette card from the 1880s

Tilbury was known first on the London stage and on Broadway in New York City. In 1881, she debuted on stage in Nine Points of the Law at the Theatre Royal, Brighton, England.

She is today best known for playing wise or evil older characters in films, such as the distinguished lady gambler at dinner with Garbo in The Single Standard, as the pitiful Grandma Joad in The Grapes of Wrath and Grandma Lester in Tobacco Road.

She appeared in over 70 films. Her earliest surviving silent film is the Valentino / Nazimova 1921 production of Camille. Tilbury is probably best remembered as the old woman in the 1936 Hal Roach Our Gang comedy Second Childhood. She is befriended by Spanky and his friends on her birthday and, as a result, is transformed from a lonely, disagreeable recluse to a happy and loving carefree soul. In the same year she also portrayed the Gypsy Queen in the Laurel and Hardy film The Bohemian Girl.

== Personal life ==
Tilbury was married twice. First to Arthur Frederick Lewis in West Derby in June 1887, and later to L.E. Woodthorpe in 1904, who died on 8 April 1915.

In 1899 Zeffie had a painful accident:

Playgoers will be glad to learn that Miss Zeffie Tilbury is rapidly recovering from the severe burns she suffered from the bursting of a spirit lamp while devotedly nursing her mother, Miss Lydia Thompson.

== Death ==
She died in Los Angeles, California in 1950 at the age of 86.

== Stage performances ==
This list was created from a search of advertisements and reviews in British newspapers.

| Year | Play | Role | Genre | Theatre |
| 1881 | Nine Points of the Law | | | Theatre Royal, Brighton |
| 1884 | The Private Secretary | Eva Webster | Farce | Globe |
| 1885 | Ruth's Romance | | Comedietta | Olympic |
| 1886 | Turned Up | Sabina | Melodramatic Farcical Comedy | Comedy |
| 1886 | Curiosity | Mrs Daisy Bangerpush | Farcical Comedy | Vaudeville |
| 1887 | Pygmalion and Galatea | Cynisca | Mythological Comedy | Theatre Royal, Sheffield |
| 1887 | Fazio; or The Italian Wife's Revenge | Aldabella | Tragedy | Alexandra, Liverpool |
| 1887 | The Winter's Tale | Mopsa | | Lyceum |
| 1890 | [Title not known] | Valerie De Vaux | Military Comedy | Academy of Music, Halifax, Nova Scotia |
| 1893 | The Crust of Society | | | Grand Opera House, Toronto |
| 1894 | The Idler | | | Schiller, Chicago |
| 1898 | Love Wisely; or The Setting of the Sun | Lucy | One-act Play | The Avenue, London |
| 1898 | She Stoops to Conquer | Miss Neville | Farce | Terry's |
| 1898 | The School for Scandal | Lady Sneerwell | Comedy of Manners | Terry's |
| 1899 | Counsel's Opinion | Mrs Lovelace | A Legal Episode in One Act | Lyceum |
| 1900 | The Meeting | Constance | Duologue | St Martin's Town Hall |
| 1900 | Henry V | Isabel, Queen of France | History Play | Lyceum |
| 1901 | Twelfth Night | Maria | | Her Majesty's |
| 1901 | Macaire | Aline | Melodramatic Farce | Her Majesty's |
| 1901 | The Red Lamp | Felise | Melodrama | Grand Theatre, Fulham |
| 1901 | The Last of the Dandies | Lady Carrollby | Four-act Play | Her Majesty's |
| 1902 | The Merry Wives of Windsor | Mistress Quickly | Farce | Her Majesty's |
| 1903 | The Merry Wives of Windsor | Mistress Quickly | Farce | Touring America |
| 1909 | The Passion Flower | | Social Life in New York | Touring America |
| 1911 | Everywoman and Anyman | The Woman | Vaudeville Sketch | Winter Garden, New York |

== Filmography ==
| Year | Title | Role | Notes |
|---|---|---|---|
| 1917 | Blind Man's Luck | Mrs. Guerton | |
| 1919 | The Avalanche | Mrs. Ruyler | Lost film |
| 1919 | A Society Exile | Mrs. Stanley Shelby | Lost film |
| 1920 | Mothers of Men | Mrs. De La Motte | |
| 1920 | Clothes | Mrs. Cathcart | Lost film |
| 1921 | The Marriage of William Ashe | Lady Tranmore | |
| 1921 | Big Game | | |
| 1921 | Camille | Prudence | |
| 1924 | Another Scandal | Brownie | Lost film |
| 1927 | The Night of Love | Lady in Waiting | Uncredited |
| 1929 | The Single Standard | Mrs. Handley | |
| 1930 | The Ship from Shanghai | Lady Daley | |
| 1931 | Charlie Chan Carries On | Mrs. Luce | Lost film |
| 1933 | Made on Broadway | Aunt Ada | Uncredited |
| 1933 | Blind Adventure | | Uncredited |
| 1934 | Two Alone | Rogers' Neighbor | Uncredited |
| 1934 | Mystery Liner | Granny Plimpton | |
| 1934 | Bachelor Bait | Miss Turner | Uncredited |
| 1935 | Women Must Dress | Peg Martin | |
| 1935 | The Mystery of Edwin Drood | The Opium Woman | |
| 1935 | Werewolf of London | Mrs. Moncaster | |
| 1935 | Public Hero No. 1 | Deaf Woman in Scottsdale Bar | Uncredited |
| 1935 | Stranded | Old Hag | Uncredited |
| 1935 | The Farmer Takes a Wife | Old Townswoman | Uncredited |
| 1935 | Alice Adams | Mrs. Dresser | Uncredited |
| 1935 | Navy Wife | Bridge Player | Uncredited |
| 1935 | The Last Days of Pompeii | The Wise Woman | |
| 1935 | Bad Boy | Deaf Woman | Uncredited |
| 1936 | The Bohemian Girl | Gypsy Queen | |
| 1936 | Desire | Aunt Olga | |
| 1936 | Second Childhood | Grandma | Short |
| 1936 | Parole! | Molly Smith | Uncredited |
| 1936 | The White Angel | Woman Donating Sheets | Uncredited |
| 1936 | Anthony Adverse | Old Woman at Chalet | Uncredited |
| 1936 | The Gorgeous Hussy | Mrs. Daniel Beall | |
| 1936 | Give Me Your Heart | Esther Warren | |
| 1936 | Old Hutch | Elderly Woman in Bank | Uncredited |
| 1936 | Camille | Old Duchess Bidding 3750 Francs | Uncredited |
| 1936 | After the Thin Man | Aunt Lucy | Uncredited |
| 1937 | Under Cover of Night | Mrs. Nash | |
| 1937 | Bulldog Drummond Escapes | Jail Cell Drunk | Uncredited |
| 1937 | Maid of Salem | Goody Rogers | |
| 1937 | Midnight Taxi | Mrs. Lane | Uncredited |
| 1937 | Parnell | Old Lady | Uncredited |
| 1937 | Rhythm in the Clouds | Maggie Conway - the Duchess de Lovely | |
| 1937 | Hideaway | Mrs. Beamish | Uncredited |
| 1937 | Fit for a King | Duchess Louise - Reception Guest | Uncredited |
| 1937 | Bulldog Drummond Comes Back | Effie | |
| 1937 | It Happened in Hollywood | Miss Gordon | |
| 1937 | Federal Bullets | Mrs. Crippen | |
| 1938 | Bulldog Drummond's Peril | Mrs. Weevens | |
| 1938 | Kidnapped | Old Woman | Uncredited |
| 1938 | Hunted Men | Flower Woman | Uncredited |
| 1938 | Woman Against Woman | Grandma | |
| 1938 | Marie Antoinette | Dowager at Birth of Dauphin | Uncredited |
| 1938 | Block-Heads | Dowager Seated Near Stairs | (scenes deleted) |
| 1938 | Arrest Bulldog Drummond | Aunt Meg | |
| 1939 | Boy Trouble | Mrs. Jepson | |
| 1939 | The Story of Alexander Graham Bell | Mrs. Sanders | |
| 1939 | Tell No Tales | Miss Mary | |
| 1939 | Lady of the Tropics | Woman Congratulating Manon | Uncredited |
| 1939 | Balalaika | Princess Natalya Petrovna | |
| 1940 | Emergency Squad | Mrs. Cobb | Uncredited |
| 1940 | The Earl of Chicago | Miss Nana | Uncredited |
| 1940 | The Grapes of Wrath | Grandma Joad | |
| 1940 | Comin' Round the Mountain | Granny Stokes | |
| 1940 | She Couldn't Say No | Ma Hawkins | |
| 1941 | Tobacco Road | Grandma Lester | |
| 1941 | Sheriff of Tombstone | Granny Carson | |
| 1942 | Flying with Music | Fortune Teller | Uncredited, (final film role) |
