= Jean-Daniel =

Jean-Daniel is a given name. Notable people with the name include:

- Jean-Daniel Akpa Akpro (born 1992), professional footballer
- Jean-Daniel Boissonnat (born 1953), French computer scientist, director of research at INRIA
- Jean-Daniel Cadinot (1944–2008), French photographer, director and producer of gay pornographic films
- Jean-Daniel Colladon (1802–1893), Swiss physicist
- Jean-Daniel Dätwyler (born 1945), Swiss former alpine skier and Olympic medalist
- Jean-Daniel Dumas (1721–1794), French officer in the Seven Years' War
- Jean-Daniel Fekete, French computer scientist
- Jean-Daniel Flaysakier (1951–2021), French doctor and journalist
- Jean-Daniel Gerber (born 1946), Swiss economist and diplomat
- Jean-Daniel Gross (born 1966), Swiss football manager and former player
- Jean-Daniel Lafond CC RCA (born 1944), French-born Canadian filmmaker, teacher of philosophy, Viceregal Consort of Canada
- Jean-Daniel Masserey (born 1972), Swiss ski mountaineer
- Jean-Daniel Nicoud (born 1938), Swiss computer scientist, inventor of the CALM programming language
- Jean-Daniel Ndong Nzé (born 1970), Gabonese footballer
- Jean-Daniel Padovani (born 1980), French former footballer
- Jean-Daniel Pollet (1936–2004), French film director and screenwriter
- Jean-Daniel Raulet (born 1946), French former racing driver
- Jean-Daniel Simon (1942–2021), French film director, screenwriter and actor

== See also ==
- Daniel Jean, National Security Advisor to the Prime Minister of Canada
- Jean Daniel (1920–2020), French journalist and author
- Jean-Marc Daniel
- Jean Daniélou
- John A. Daniel
- John Daniel (disambiguation)
- John Daniell (disambiguation)
- John W. Daniel
