= Joe Martin (orangutan) =

Silent-era film performer, zoo animal

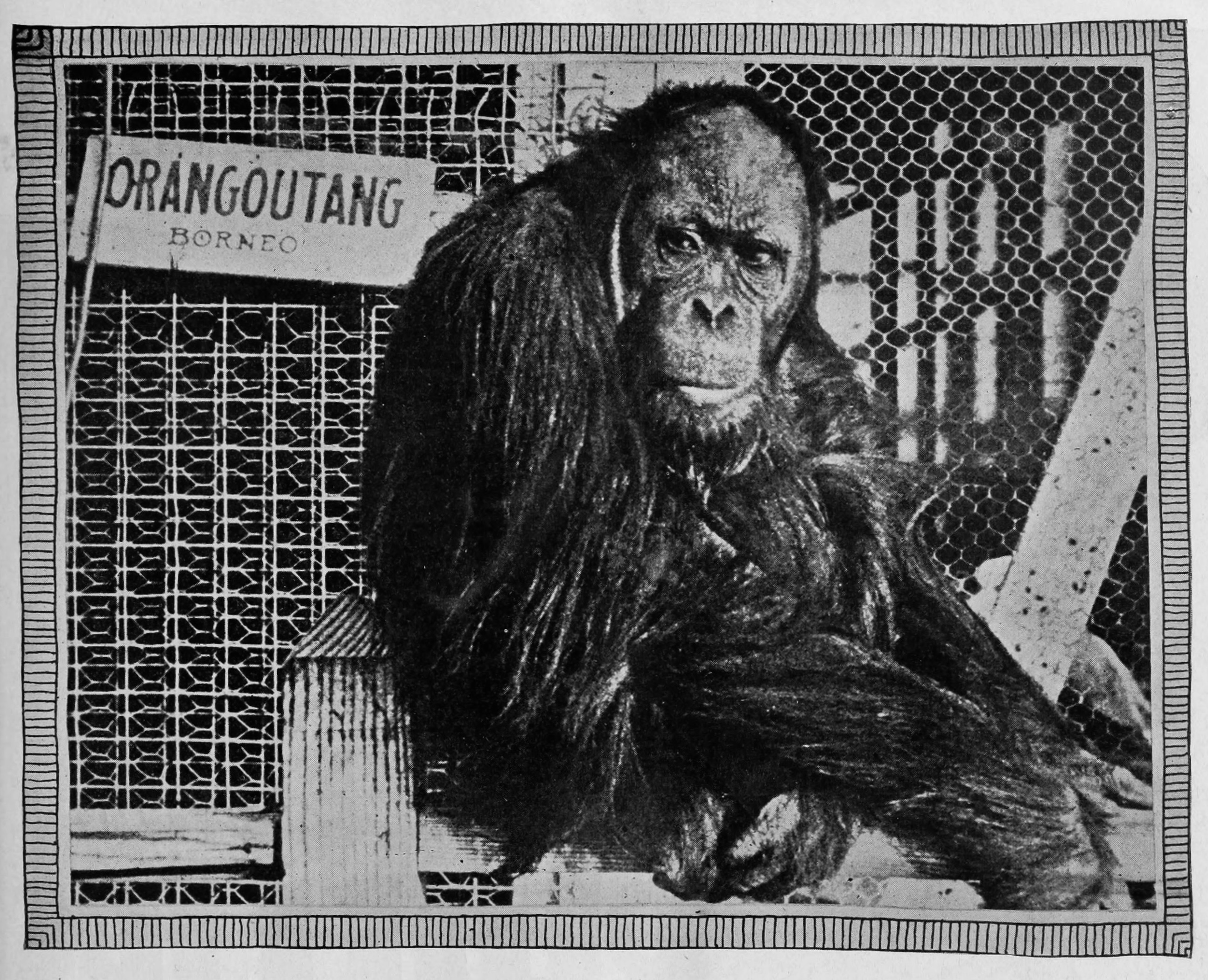
- Joe Martin at Universal City Zoo, 1919
- Other names: Chimpanzee Charlie, Giant Gorilla Man
- Species: Pongo (genus), species unidentified
- Sex: Male
- Born: c. 1910-1913; Indonesian archipelago
- Died: after 1931
- Occupation: Animal actor, circus-zoo animal
- Years active: 1914–1931
- Owners: Robison brothers, Sam Behrendt, Universal Pictures, Barnes Circus
- Weight: 185 lb (84 kg)
- Height: 65 in (170 cm)

Joe Martin (born circa 1910 – died after 1931) was a captive orangutan who appeared in at least 50 American films of the silent era, including approximately 20 comedy shorts, several serials, two Tarzan movies, Rex Ingram's melodrama Black Orchid and its remake Trifling Women, the Max Linder feature comedy Seven Years Bad Luck, and the Irving Thalberg-produced Merry-Go-Round.

Joe Martin was human-acculturated and was characterized as human-like during his life. Upon entering adolescence, Joe Martin began to physically attack humans and other animals, including studio staff, director Al Santell, his trainers, and actors including Dorothy Phillips and Edward Connelly. At least three of these cases were apparent defenses of a woman, child, or animal. He staged major zoo escapes at least twice, once releasing the wolves and the elephant on the way out, and, separately, while evading recapture, relieving a police officer of his gun.

In 1924, Universal Pictures deemed Joe Martin too dangerous to work in film and sold him to the Al G. Barnes Circus, where he remained until approximately 1931. Although the circumstances of his death are unknown, Joe Martin had a long lifespan for a captive orangutan of his era.

== Background ==
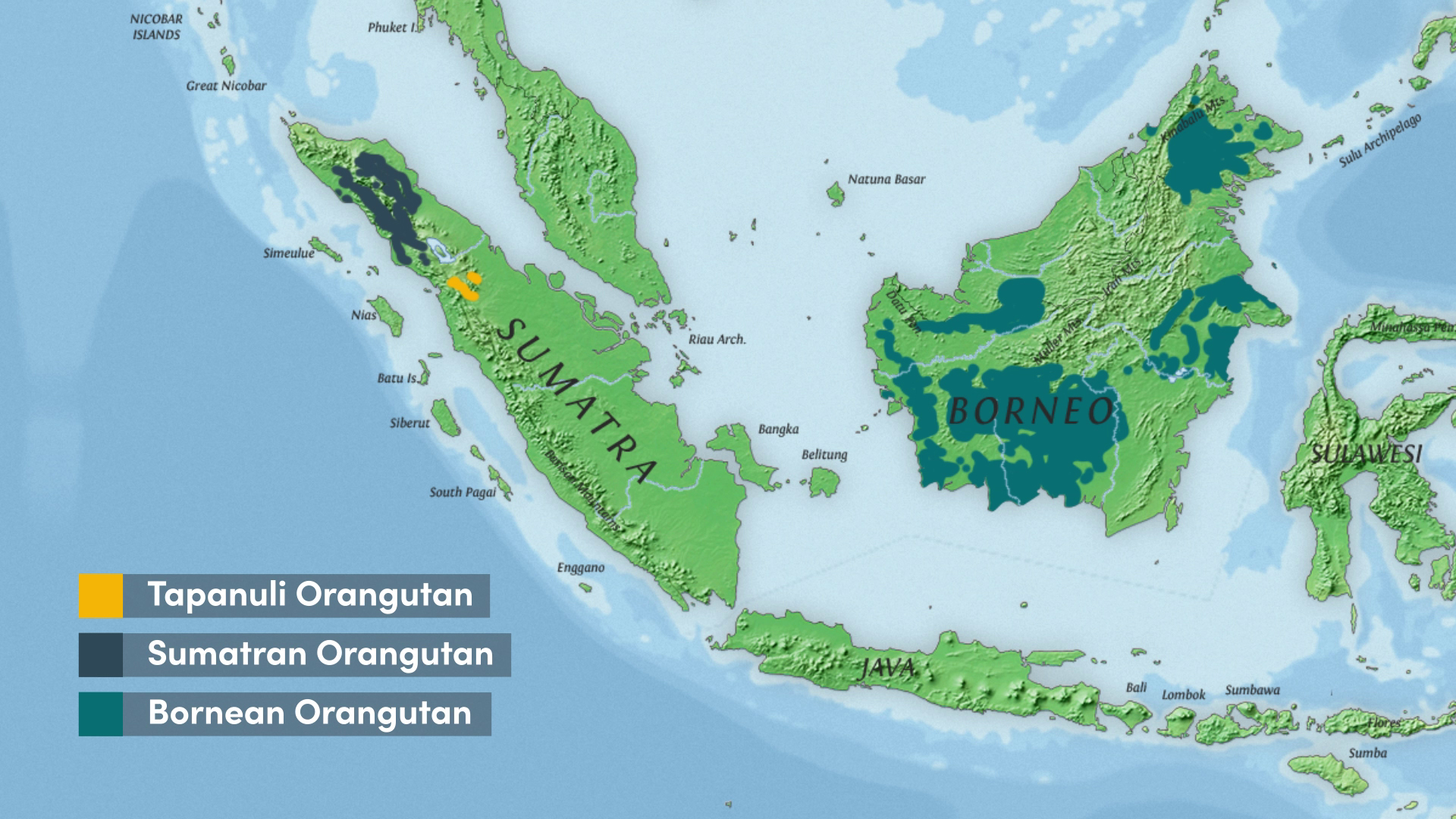
Current range of the three orangutan species

Prior to 1924, there were no legal prohibitions against killing, capturing, or selling orangutans. In the 19th and early 20th century, selling orangutans was profitable for an elaborate network of hunters, middlemen, and dealers. Orangutan hunting and trapping has been illegal in Indonesia since 1931, but trading remained widespread until the mid-20th century and provincial hunting and trading persists in the 21st century.

According to zoologists, captive orangutan survival rates were dismal and lifespans short. Death rates were high in part because members of the Pongo genus are highly susceptible to human-transmitted respiratory infections. An estimated 60 percent of trafficked orangutans died in passage, and the majority of the survivors died within their first year in overseas captivity. In the first decades of the 20th century, it was uncommon for orangutans to survive more than 18 months in captivity. Prior to the 1920s, the longest an orangutan had ever survived in captivity was six years; the mean lifespan for all captive orangutans was three-and-a-half years.

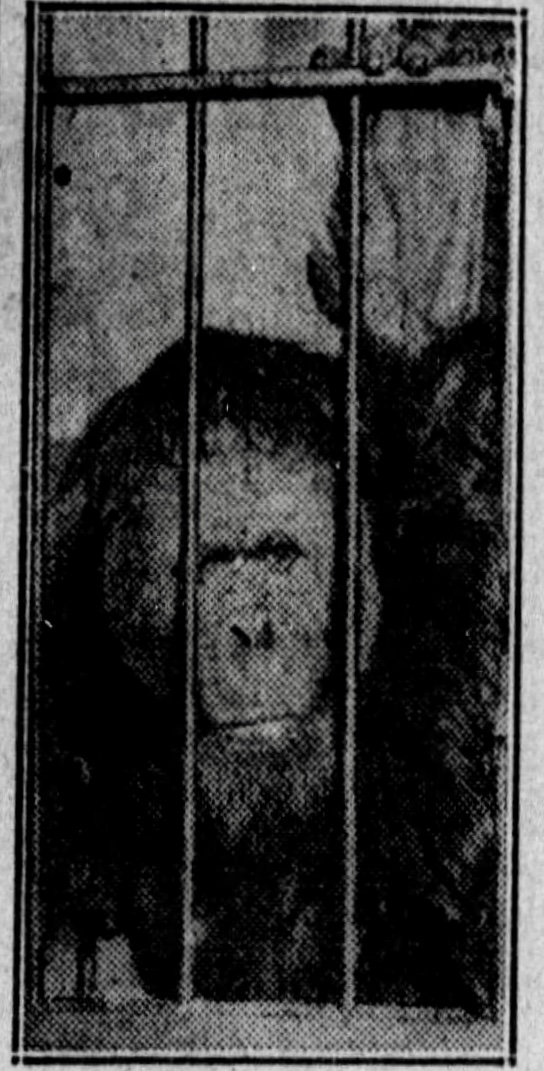
Joe Martin during his first year with the Barnes Circus

In the United States, exotic animal dealers provided a steady supply of captured wild animals in response to a robust demand from wealthy private collectors, traveling circuses, roadside zoos, vaudeville shows, and the burgeoning international film industry. As one historical review of stunt performers and lion tamers described it, "Filmmakers were drawn to wild animals as a practical means of creating cinematic spectacle."

In the early years of the 20th century, and as the film industry moved west to Los Angeles, the city simultaneously became "the national center for wild animals and their trainers". Joe Martin likely spent most of his life in two Los Angeles settlements—Universal City and Barnes City—that were established specifically to sell spectacle.

== Biography ==
=== Transoceanic shipment and first owners ===
Various contemporaneous news stories suggested he was born between 1912 and 1914, and several, but not all, say he came from Borneo, homeland of the Bornean orangutan (Pongo pygmaeus). Research into the history of primate trafficking has found that "while the orangutan was most closely associated with the island of Borneo, by the early 1900s a majority of orangutans on the global market were captured in, and exported from, northern Sumatra." Sumatra is the homeland of the surviving populations of Sumatran orangutans (Pongo abelii) and Tapanuli orangutans (Pongo tapanuliensis).

Joe Martin's primary trainer told several reporters that Joe Martin could have been as young as five or six months old when he arrived. As with all primates, the mother-child dyad is foundational to infant survival, and young orangutans are heavily dependent on maternal care until at least age eight, "thus obtaining infants requires mothers to be killed in nearly all instances".

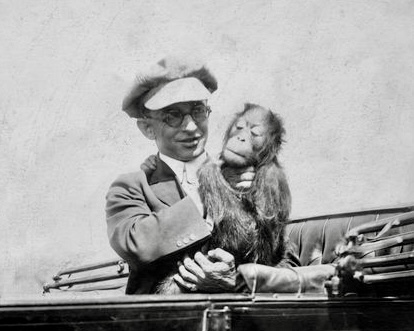
Universal Pictures executive Isadore Bernstein with an unidentified orangutan, c. 1916

According to Camera! and the San Antonio Express, Joe Martin first arrived to the United States in 1911 in San Francisco via Singapore in "aconsignment of animals" to the animal dealer Robison of San Francisco. (Note: Publicist Frank Buck claimed to have imported Joe Martin but evidence suggests that this was false. Ansel W. Robison told the Saturday Evening Post in 1953 that he had first met Frank Buck in 1915 (after Joe Martin's film career was already well underway). At that time, "There was nothing to link [Buck] to animals...except his modest taste for finches.") Robison then sold Joe Martin for US$250 (equivalent to $8,638 in 2025) to a Los Angeles insurance company owner named Sam Behrendt. (Note: Behrendt-Lévy Insurance Agency apparently underwrote much of the film industry's insurance in the early 20th century.) Behrendt put Joe Martin in an exhibit at Venice Pier called The Missing Link, where he was under the care of animal trainer "Pop" Saunders. Saunders had "trained hundreds of animals for the circus arena and for the movies." (Journalist Emma-Lindsay Squier referred to Martin's first American trainer as Red Gallagher, though that was likely a pseudonym for Saunders. (Note: Emma-Lindsay Squier almost certainly created pseudonyms for both trainers, as the "Pudgy" of her article is without question Curley Stecker.))

After a fire at the pier, (Note: This could potentially be the 1912 or 1915 Ocean Park pier fires.) Saunders relocated with Joe Martin to Universal's "Old Ranch". (Note: Carl Laemmle purchased four nearby ranches for US$165,000. Groundbreaking was in June 1914 and some 50 movies had already been filmed at Universal City when the grand opening was held on March 15, 1915.) At that time, Universal was leasing several animals from the Sells Floto Circus for a film, and someone suggested including an orangutan. Charles B. Murphy is said to have prepared Joe Martin for his first picture, a one-reel comedy directed by Allen Turner, after which Universal bought Joe Martin from Behrendt for an undisclosed sum. A third source, the posthumously published memoir of circus operator Alpheus George Barnes Stonehouse, states, "Joe Martin, the famous orang-utan movie star, was bought by my brother Jerry M. Barnes for the Universal Motion Picture Company. My brother started training him for the movies and his training was finished by Mr. Murphy, who worked for the Universal."

=== 1915–1917: Breakout film and early work ===
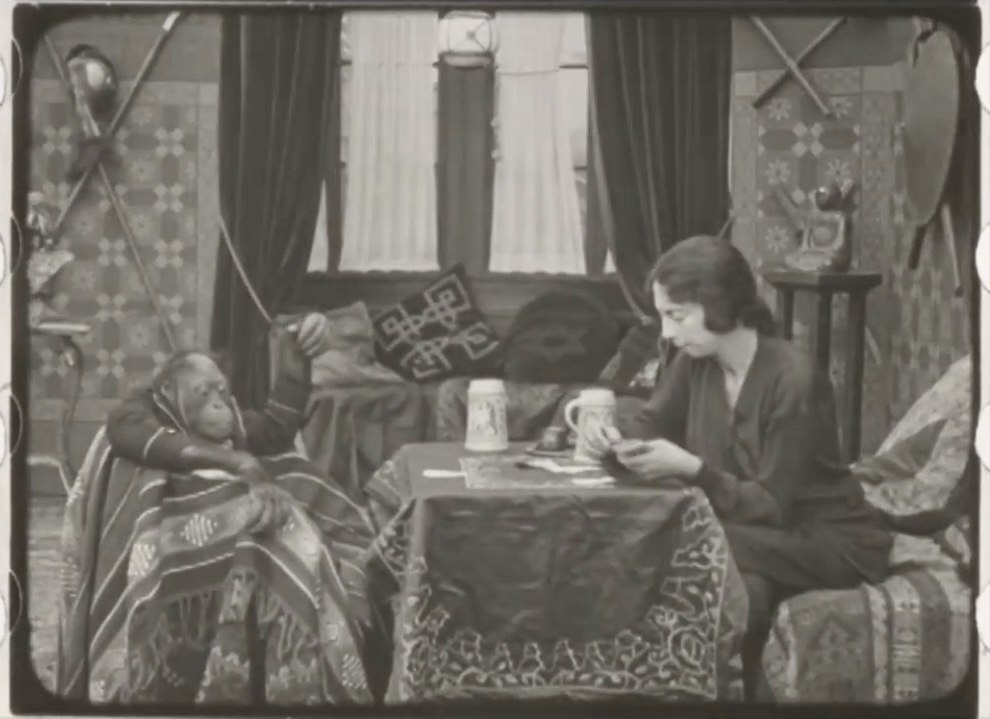
Joe Martin and Gale Henry in Detective Duck and Lady Baffles (1915)

With few exceptions, Joe Martin's short comedies are all believed to be lost films. As such, most (Note: The confirmed survivors, all in the public domain and available online, are Detective Duck and Lady Baffles, Seven Years Bad Luck, Merry-Go-Round, The Adventures of Tarzan and a newsreel. Man and Beast may be in the Museum of Modern Art collection, and Monkey Stuff may be held by the British Film Institute. See Joe Martin (orangutan) filmography citations for catalog references for the possibly extant films.) of Joe Martin's film work, like many silent films, is known to film historians only through marketing materials, production stills, and media mentions. A portion of the Universal lot in the San Fernando Valley housed a wide array of performing animals; many silent-era animal scenes were shot in a central area of the Universal City Zoo called the arena. Joe Martin's breakout role was a two-reel short called Joe Martin Turns 'Em Loose "produced at the famous Universal City Zoo" and released in 1915. In the film, Martin opens the animal cages at a local circus, sending a stampede after bystanding humans. Prior to the success of this film, Joe Martin was known as "Chimpanzee Charlie".

Around 1915, an animal trainer named Curley Stecker began taking care of Joe Martin. Curley is sometimes credited with "discovering" Joe Martin; they worked as a team for the next eight years. Stecker's family would sometimes appear alongside Joe Martin in films. The Stecker family rented a house across the road from the studio zoo, the zoo having been created in part as a "point of interest" at Universal City. The keepers were responsible for introducing the animals to visiting dignitaries; one such visit was made by Bishop Hanna of San Francisco in 1915. Later, one of Joe Martin's directors wrote of the visit: "A famous old prelate came out to Universal City to see Joe. Joe listened while the old gentleman commented on the wonders of nature. 'You wouldn't catch a monkey taking a drink of vile liquor,' he observed. Joe reached in the hip pocket of his little pantaloons and came out with a pint of liquor, which he offered to the bishop with fine courtesy."

In the first three years of his career, Joe Martin appeared in at least 20 films, including Rex Ingram's vampy feature melodrama Black Orchids. (Five years later, Joe Martin later played the same part in the retitled remake Trifling Women, which turned out to be one of his last on-screen credits.) According Universal's in-house magazine Moving Picture Weekly, Joe Martin may have costarred with Wallace Beery in one or more shorts called The Janitor, directed by Beery and released in 1916. The article about Beery's films noted that Joe Martin was "absolutely devoted" to zoo superintendent Rex De Rosselli and never let De Rosselli pass by without a hug; Joe Martin was not as affectionate with Beery. A news item about a Joe Martin one-reel directed by De Rosselli noted, "The simian seems to understand what his director tells him, and he is doing some wonderful work."

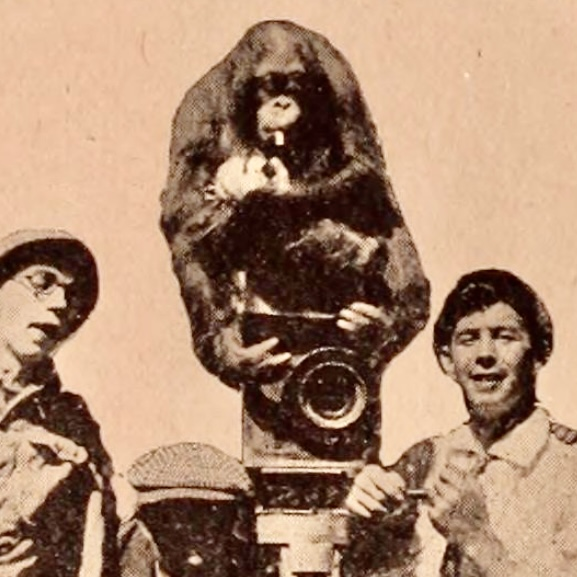
Joe Martin with the crew of The Missing Link (1916)

A 1916 magazine feature on "Making Pictures in California" reported of the recently opened Universal zoo: "Here we find Joe, the chimpanzee, who sleeps in a regular brass bed, uses a toothpick after meals, etc." Joe Martin was taught to wear clothes and given a weekly shave, and seemed to enjoy the latter, although if the razor was dull, he was known to throw things at the barber. On the occasions when he was allowed to roam the lot and was thirsty, he knew to put his thumb over the faucet spigot to direct the stream of water into his mouth. Joe Martin reportedly attempted to escape the Universal lot in the summer of 1917, but his child costar Lena Baskette lured him back to his enclosure. Meanwhile, human-interest blurbs about Joe Martin were being placed in regional newspapers: "Joe recently received a letter...reading as follows: 'Dear Joe Martin: I wish you would send me your picture. My papa says you are only a monkey, but I think you are an actor."

=== 1918: Night-watchman incident ===
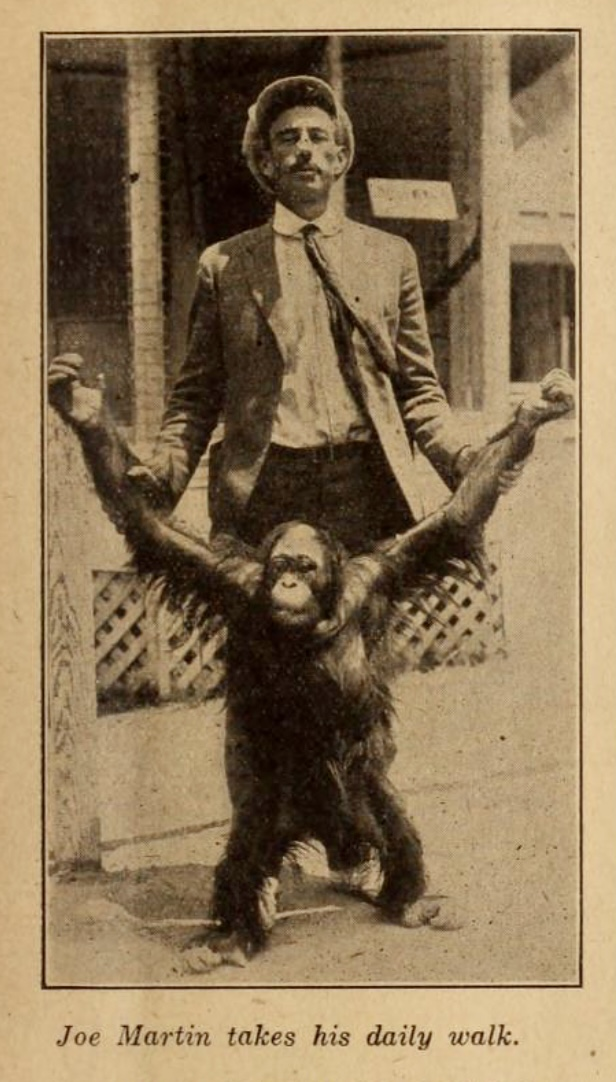
Curley Stecker and Joe Martin

Joe Martin worked with child actors frequently, including in the 1918 film Man and Beast, where his child costar was likely Curley Stecker's two-year-old son.

In late 1918, Universal security guard Thomas G. Cockings made the first public allegation that Joe Martin had assaulted a human in a $10,000 (equivalent to $214,049 in 2025) lawsuit. Cockings claimed that Joe Martin had bitten him 40 times on the legs. The studio claimed at the Superior Court hearing that Joe Martin was "lovable," sharing photos of him walking with and embracing women, holding a baby, and wearing a flu mask, while one witness for the company testified that Joe Martin had hugged and kissed him at their first meeting. The outcome of the case was not publicized, but in 1920 actor-director Al Santell told Photoplay, "There was a night watchman at the menagerie for a while who always carried a bottle with him on his rounds and now and then he'd give Joe a drink. But one night when he was three sheets to the wind he put red pepper in the whisky and oh boy! Joe nearly went crazy trying to get at the man...But he never hurts a woman or a child. When we use babies in the animal comedies they are absolutely safe with him."

=== 1919: Escapes and Al Santell incident ===
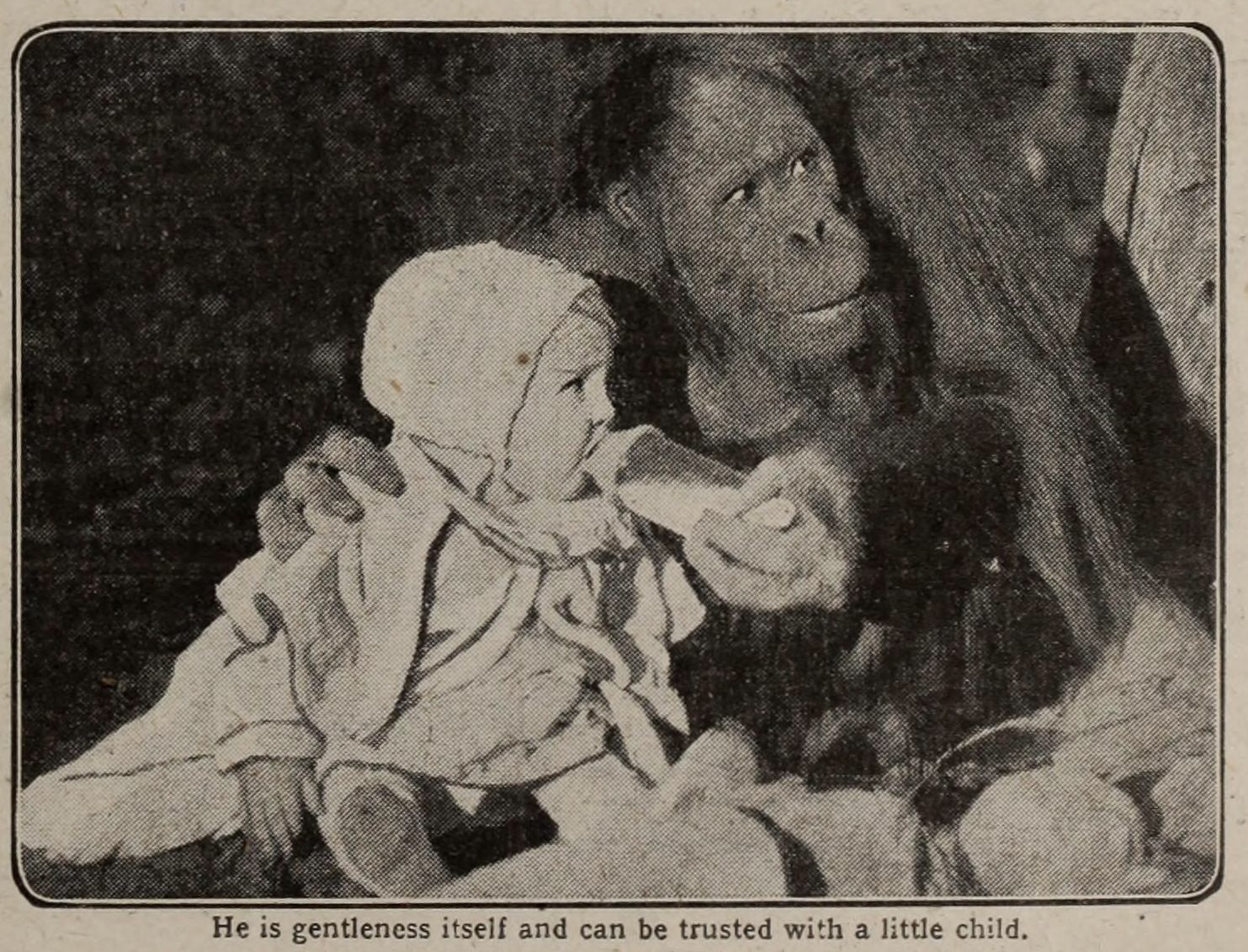
Joe Martin with a human child

Business-wise, in 1919, when other film companies wanted to use him, Joe Martin's rental rate was said to be $100 a day. Universal thought he was worth $7,000 to $10,000. In his personal life, he had the frequent company of a small monkey called Skipper, and was said to "get along alright" with children, kittens, and lion cubs. An advertisement in a Canadian newspaper for Universal's two-reeler Jazz Monkey included a humorous essay about Joe Martin's diet which stated that Joe Martin consumed a vegetarian diet of carrots, turnips, onions, corn on the ears, alligator pears, "root beer, ice-cream soda, coco-cola, or malted milk, to any extent a friend is able to buy," and "tobacco in moderation, preferring the smokeless variety." A later report said that Joe Martin's diet usually consisted of vegetables and a mixture of malted milk and warm water, sometimes supplemented with eggs "to give it more body and flavor." Sunday was a day of fasting for the zoo, followed by a richer meal than usual on Monday morning.

In June, Universal bought a full-page ad in Wid's Filmdom for an open letter to the industry. The letter, signed by Universal's founding mogul, Carl Laemmle, called Joe Martin "the only guaranteed star on the screen" and stated:

We have made a real actor of him. True, he is temperamental, as nearly all stars are; but we have never yet seen any star who was more willing, more daring, more clever or more brainy…He has shown a spirit of true manliness. For this and many other reasons I feel that I owe him this public appreciation.

A couple of months later, Universal published an anecdote about the filming of Jazz Monkey in the "Joe Martin Soliloquizes" ad series, which was written from Joe Martin's point of view. In a scene where Joe Martin was due to confront the lion endangering the heroine, the ad read, "I was afraid the gun wouldn't go off (property men are merely human) so I gave it an affectionate kiss just before I pulled the trigger and said in an offhand sort of way, 'Sweet baby don't fail me now!'...Well, sir, darn if the title writer didn't swipe the whole line, word for word, exactly as I said it...I wasn't even trying to be funny, yet they laughed."

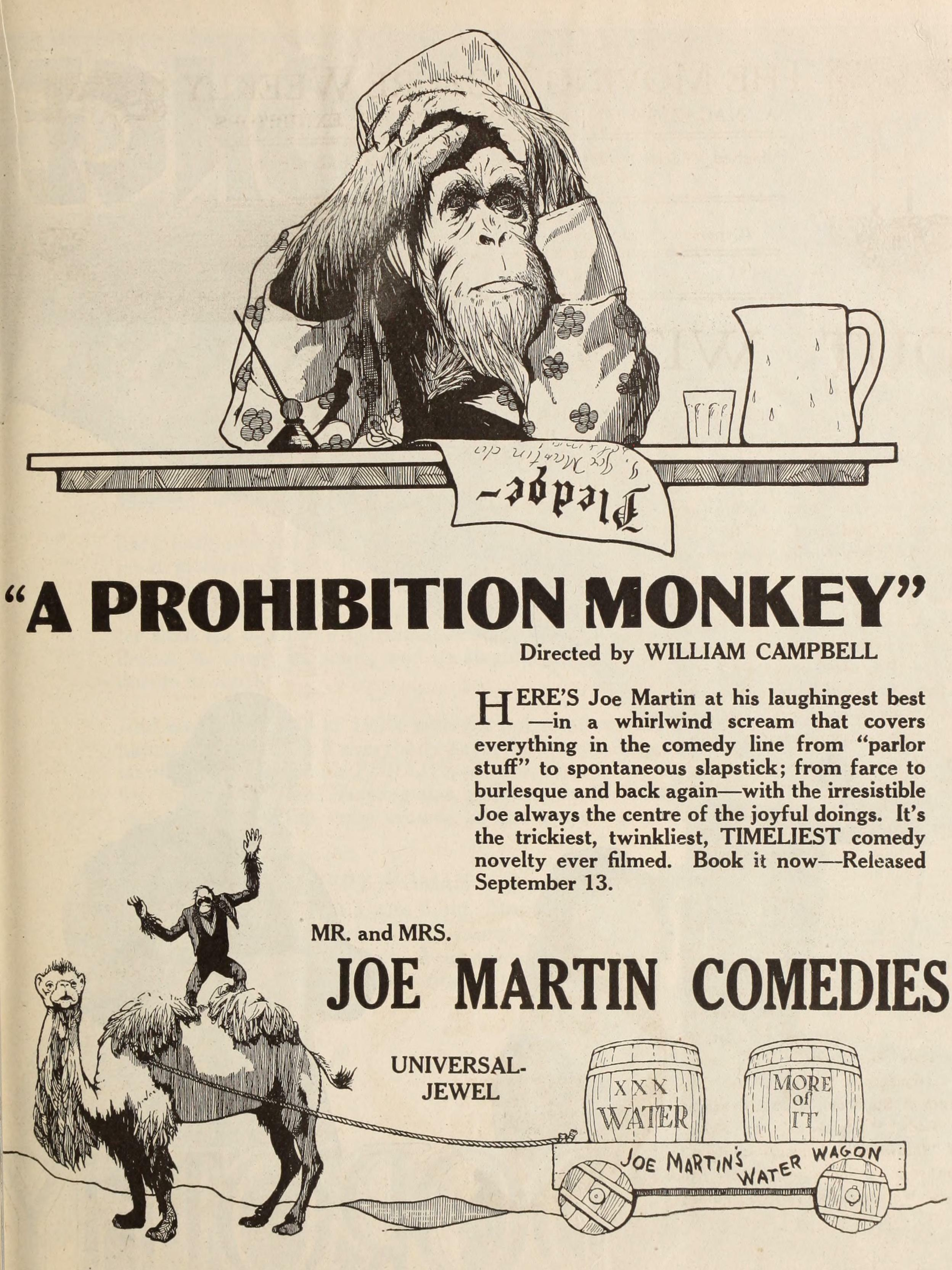
A Prohibition Monkey (1920), a Joe Martin comedy topical to the then-recent prohibition of alcohol in the United States

In June 1919, Joe Martin attended a screening of his own film, Monkey Stuff, put on by the Los Angeles Evening Herald as an employment perk for its newsboys. Martin wore a Palm Beach suit, carried a cane, and "clapped his hands frequently and laughed monkey laughs whenever anything struck him as being particularly good." Another article reported that Joe Martin looked back and forth between his hands and the screen several times before "he apparently came to the conclusion that it was himself he was looking at." Around the same time, an Ohio columnist reported that Joe Martin finger-combed his hair in the mornings, and turned the mirror to face the wall on bad hair days. The writer also made impressive primate cognition claims about Joe Martin: "The remarkable animal understands any spoken command, even listens in on private conversations and does stunts that were suggested for him but rejected by the trainer...His mental processes function without command from the trainer, an unusual trait. Upon leaving his cage he will carefully close the doors, slipping the hasp over its staple." A 1924 report claimed "he would pull a key ring out of his pocket, select the right key, and unlock his cage."

In July 1919, Joe Martin escaped from the zoo and went on a multi-day rampage in which time he wrecked an assistant trainer's quarters, released approximately 15 wolves, (Note: The "wolves" were most likely the zoo's Alaskan Malamutes and Siberian Huskies that played wolves on film.) freed Charlie the Elephant, and created general havoc. Joe Martin then scaled the Universal barn and refused to leave the roof for hours. His trainer placed food in his cage, but when Joe Martin finally came down, he ripped the cage door off its hinges before entering so he could not be trapped while collecting his meal. After some time, Joe Martin was found sleeping in the warm sand of a dry creek bed .5 mi (800 m) from the studio. Curley Stecker was able to lasso him and return him to custody. Meanwhile, an Omaha, Nebraska newspaper entertainment columnist reported that Joe Martin escaped the arena, got to a main road and encountered an "honest-to-goodness evangelist preaching to his flock from a portable tabernacle on wheels." (This may have been during the escape described above.) Apparently Joe Martin had filmed a scene in a William S. Campbell comedy where he "broke up a church meeting" and so repeated the scene in real life. "After the worshippers had scattered and the minister was safe on top of a telephone pole," Joe Martin carried on with his day.

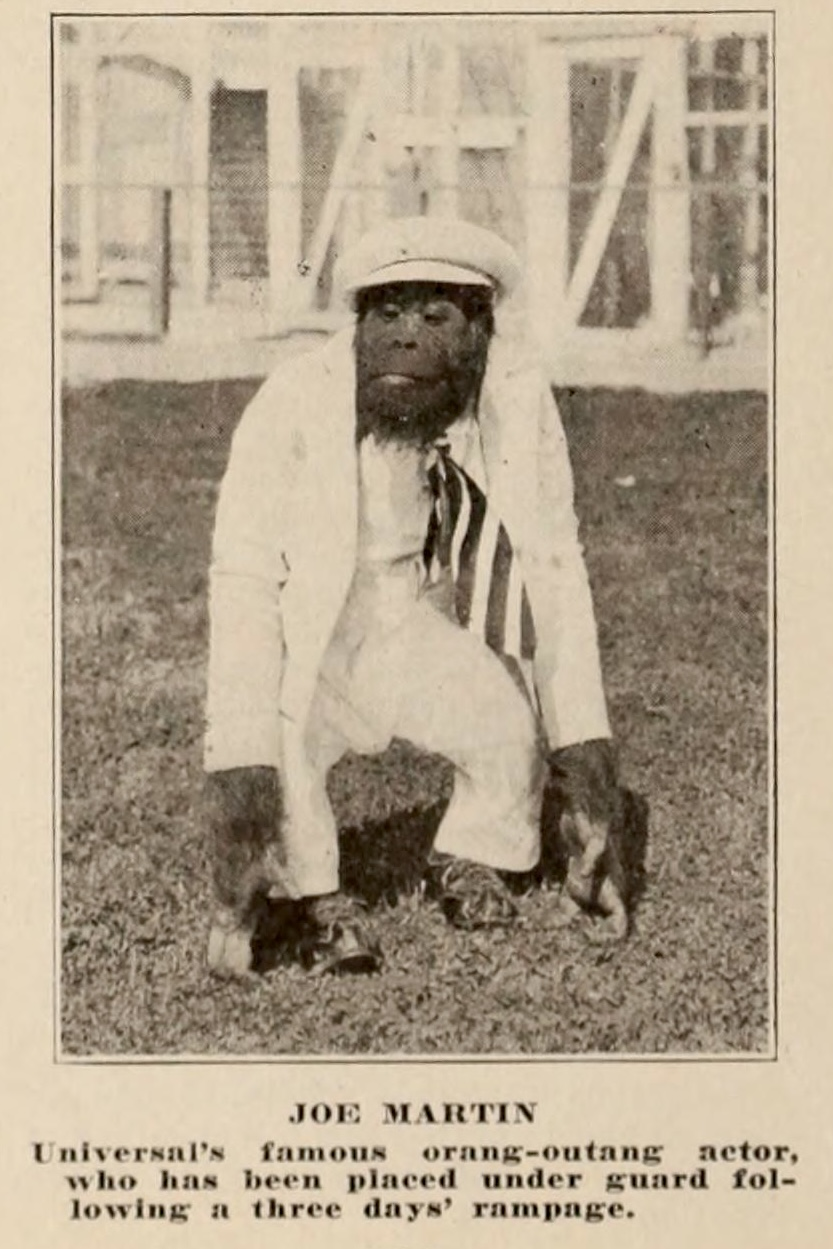
Joe Martin in front of enclosures at the Universal City Zoo

While filming a William S. Campbell comedy, Joe Martin was present during a scene in which a "hard-fried miner" spanked a child. While the scene's choreography prevented the child from being injured, it reportedly appeared realistic to Joe Martin, who confronted the actor: "Stepping down from his chair, Joe rushed the offending player. He grappled him around the ankles and tripped him up with a flying tackle that would have done wonders for a collegiate pigskinner. Having upset his victim, Joe stood over him, grinning evilly with long, barbed teeth and gathered the little kid to his hairy breast with his free arm."

The Los Angeles Times published advertorial photos of Joe Martin behind the wheel of a Kissel automobile and claimed that he had learned to drive. The content was created by Western Motor Company, Kissel distributors, and was designed to show that driving was easy. The paper also claimed that Joe Martin had recently ridden in an airplane piloted by a barnstormer contracted to Universal, Lt. Ormer Locklear.

In November 1919, Joe Martin attacked his director. In a Camera! column, Harry Burns (who would go on to direct Joe Martin) reported that "Al Santell is nursing a badly lacerated hand and foot after having a none-too-friendly set-to with Joe Martin." As reported in 1920, Al Santell "remonstrated" with Joe about slamming a door too hard and breaking the set, so Joe Martin caught "him by the ankle...took him over and rolled him down the stairs." According to one newspaper report, in his fall down two flights of stairs, Santell suffered "a badly wrenched arm, a cut on the cheek, a sprained leg and numerous bruises. Joe Martin assured the director that it was merely a disciplinary measure and that there was no malice behind the act."

=== 1920: Tarzan incident ===
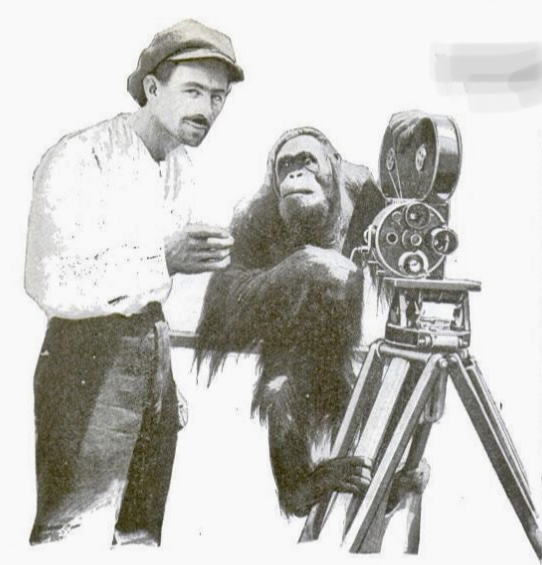
Popular Science photo featuring Curley Stecker and Joe Martin

Joe Martin may have attacked Al Santell a second time, on the set of A Wild Night (1920). In a 1972 interview surfaced by film historian Steve Massa, Santell said, "When a chimpanzee [sic] bites you, he doesn't just give you one quick bite—he clamps his teeth in, gets set, and then puts on the pressure. And I could feel each tooth mauling into my leg." It took the combined strength of Curley and Carl Stecker (Note: Carl Stecker was Curley's older brother and lived two houses down from him in Lankershim in 1920. Carl Stecker worked as a Hollywood animal trainer well into the 1930s.) to detach Joe Martin from his director. In March, Popular Science published a photo feature on the animals of the Universal City Zoo, their trainers, and their film performances. Joe Martin and Curley Stecker made multiple appearances in the magazine spread; Charlie the Elephant and Ethel the Lioness were also photographed. The same month, a Connecticut paper reported that Universal was building a "jungle bungalow" for Joe Martin with indoor plumbing and "period furniture". This building may have been used as a film set for A Monkey Movie Star, which was released the following year and was said to be Joe Martin's "autobiography". Another article mentioned that Joe Martin's "jungalow" included a bed, a sunken bathtub, a horizontal bar, and a trapeze. In March, Universal Syndicate distributed the first of the racist Joe Martin comic strips drawn by Forest McGinn, which were intended to establish Joe Martin as a multi-platform brand.

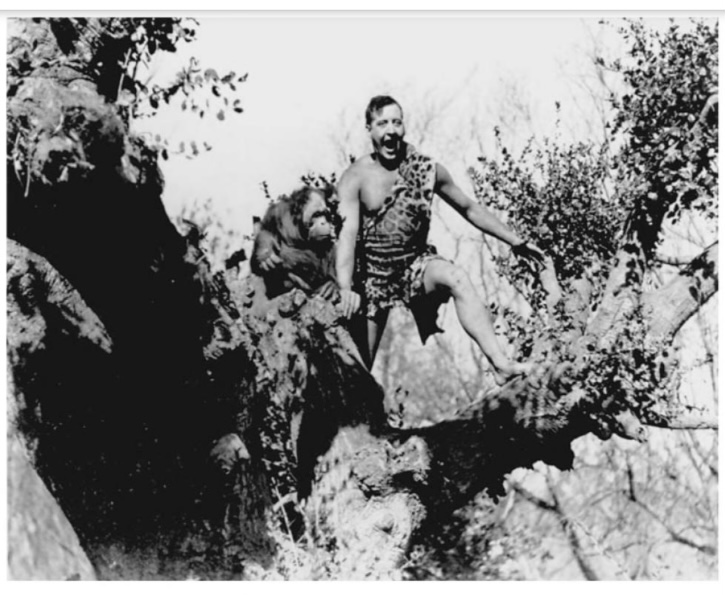
Joe Martin and Gene Pollar in The Revenge of Tarzan (1920)

Joe Martin was lent out by Universal to costar in an adventure film, The Revenge of Tarzan. Charlie the Elephant, another Universal City Zoo animal, was also credited as a performer in the movie. While doing publicity for the film in August, Gene Pollar reported that Joe Martin had attacked him on set. According to Pollar, "We were jumping...from bough to bough. I made a leap and, as my weight released it, a bough snapped back and hit Joe, standing ready to follow me, in the face. He thought I had done it on purpose...and the first thing I knew he was after me and on my back ready for fight. It took some effort to pull him off and it took triple the amount of effort and all the pastry in my lunch box to put him in friendly humor with me again."

Joe Martin reportedly spent the summer with the Ringling circus "where he and Congo, a negro advertised as an African bushman, occupied a sideshow cage together."

In a December 1920 news article, Joe Martin was said to have displayed chivalrous instincts. While filming a scene in which his character was meant to assist the villain in stealing from the heroine, Joe Martin entered the situation to find the villain looming over her: "...Joe seized the villain with his long, powerful arms and pulled his legs from under him. The villain fell to the floor with a startled cry for help, and Stecker had to explain to the trained orangutan that the threatening attitude was all in the picture."

=== 1921: Continuing in show business, Ethel Stecker incident ===
In 1921, an advertisement for A Wild Night noted, "Mr. Martin has had a longer career on the screen than any other real monkey." His owners reportedly had a $25,000 (equivalent to $451,259 in 2025) life insurance policy on Joe Martin, and he was said to receive monthly veterinary health assessments. At this time, Joe Martin reportedly earned his owners $500 a week appearing in vaudeville and $1,200 appearing in non-Universal films.

In February 1921, Universal released a one-reel short, No Monkey Business, that depicted Martin arriving home from a night at the club, acting drunk.

During this period Curley Stecker reported that he sometimes climbed onto the roof of Joe Martin's cage and looked "down at him through the grating to see how he occupied his leisure moments. Unobserved, Joe acts with the same dignified decorum which characterizes his moments before the camera." Stecker reported that Joe Martin usually remained at the back of his cage unless someone passed by, and then he would come to the front and reach his hand out in greeting. Favored visitors were offered milk. Joe Martin exhibited annoyance by retreating to his bedroom and covering his head with a blanket. When he was "furiously enraged", he would swing on his monkey bars until "his pent-up feelings [had] been relieved." In a story about their visit to Edgar Rice Burroughs' ranch, (Note: In 1919, Edgar Rice Burroughs bought 550 acres (2.2 km^{2}) of San Fernando Valley ranchland from Harrison Gray Otis. In later years, as the land was developed, residents voted to name their community Tarzana after Burroughs' Tarzan Ranch.) Stecker said: "Joe was the first to alight and shook hands cordially with the naturalist. After a walk through the house we went to the dinner table. Joe will insist on tying his napkin around his neck, but aside from that slight breach of etiquette, everything went smoothly. What surprised Mr. Burroughs most was Joe knew immediately which knife and fork to use for each course."

Three juvenile orangutans, said from to have come from Borneo in crates stuffed with "jungle grass," joined the Universal City menagerie around March 1921. Two, called Jiggs (Note: American zoos frequently named apes Jiggs and/or Maggie after the main characters of the comic strip Bringing Up Father.) and Kelly, had their own enclosure with a "heat plant" and wore "little pneumonia jackets of flannel Mrs. Stecker has made for them." (Note: The largest of the original three was called Moriarty.)

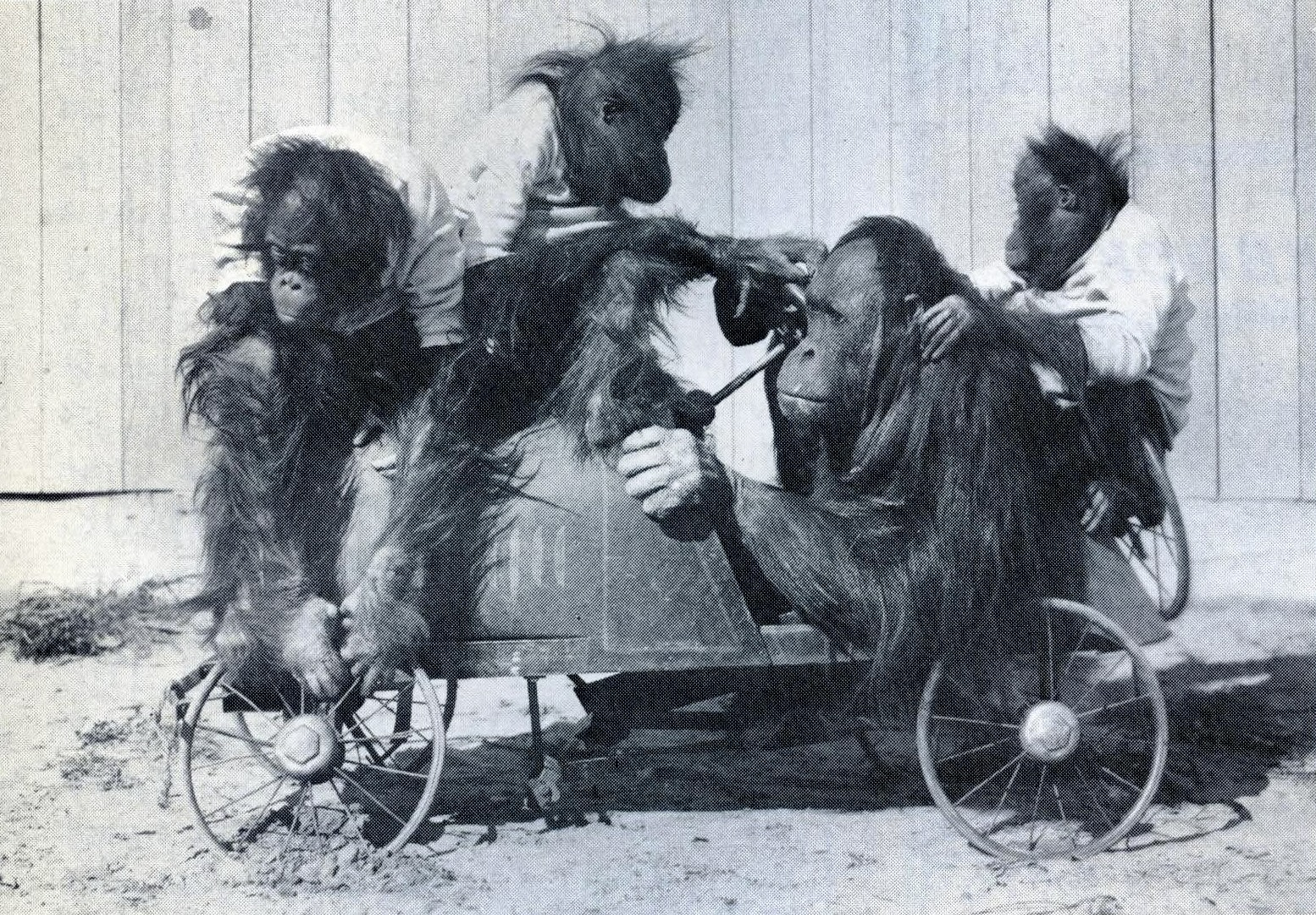
Joe Martin takes the kids for a drive in his Lightning Lizzie (1921)

Stecker mentioned to a reporter that Joe Martin's "first rampage lasted a week, in which time he took a gun away from one of the policemen who was attempting to catch him and was about to kill the cop when the rest of us were able to seize him and truss him." According to another account of the incident, the police officer had tried to shoot Joe Martin first.

In June 1921, Joe Martin may have bitten Ethel Leona Stecker (née Spurgin), the wife of Curley Stecker, while shooting A Monkey Bellhop, and had his canines removed or filed down as a consequence. According to a newspaper report, after being startled or confused or hit with a telephone thrown by Curley Stecker, or all three, Joe Martin bit into Ethel Stecker's ankle "down to the bone." By law, animals who bit humans were supposed to be killed, but Ethel Stecker pleaded for Joe Martin's life: "I brought him from a baby, I couldn't bear to part with him." Curley Stecker successfully "appealed to authorities, promising to saw off his tusks if he would be spared." Joe Martin was also considered a lucrative profit generator for the studio and much too valuable to be shot.

Joe Martin reportedly perpetrated a second assault on a woman after he threw a coconut at actress Dorothy Phillips' head, and laughed about it afterward. Phillips was saved from injury by the density of her wig.

In October 1921, the Los Angeles Herald discussed a possible legal issue related to Joe Martin's mail:

Joe gets about a dozen letters a day from all over the world, most of his correspondents being under the impression that he is 'a little man dressed up like a monkey.' It is the reverse. He is a little monkey dressed up like a man, to be more exact, a 5 ft 5 in (1.65 m) orang-outang with a human brain. Inspector Cookson of the Los Angeles office of the postal inspectors is interested in determining Joe's rights to his own mail under the postal laws. Technically Joe is an animal. Actually he is an animal with a human brain and people write to him under perfectly good 2-cent stamps. Just to avoid any encounter with the federal grand jury Stecker has just instructed Joe Martin to open his own mail. It is a regular morning ceremony now at the Universal City arena.

The possible legal issue centered around fans sending money orders to pay for photos of Joe Martin; if "Stecker should cash the money order on behalf of Universal it would take Edwin Loeb (Note: The Sterns and the Laemmles had long been clients of Edwin and Joseph P. Loeb's entertainment law-pioneering firm Loeb & Loeb.) and a whole battery of famous corporation lawyers to keep him out of the clink." When handed a stack of envelopes from his mailbag, Joe Martin would usually pick the one with the "brightest hue" or the one with the most postage stamps; he then would hold it up to the light and rip off the end of the envelope, careful not to tear the enclosed contents.

In November 1921, as part of a studio-wide restructuring, Curley Stecker was removed as head of the Universal City Zoo.

=== 1922–1923: Behavioral issues, death of Curley Stecker ===
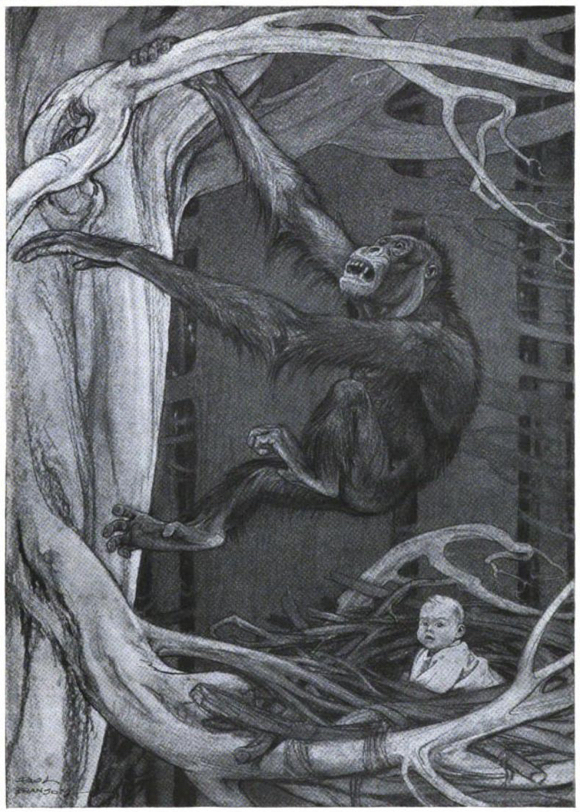
Emma-Lindsay Squier's "Joe Martin, Gentleman!" article was illustrated by Paul Bransom.

In spring 1922, The San Francisco Call reported that Joe Martin's film career was nearing an end: "Some think Joe Martin is incurably insane...when Joe showed signs of melancholia over Stecker's absence, a little monkey was placed in his cage in hopes that the companionship would stop his brooding. Joe beat the monkey to death against the bars." Joe Martin also attacked three substitute trainers while Stecker was elsewhere. Stecker was rehired after an "absence of several months". When Stecker reentered Joe Martin's cage for the first time, the orangutan first verified his identity by checking that this man was missing part of a finger (which Stecker had lost to an accident), and then he "threw hairy arms around Stecker's neck and kissed him." Around the same time, magazine writer Emma-Lindsay Squier published a book about animals subtitled Adventures in Captivity; one chapter is entirely devoted to Joe Martin, whom Squier regarded highly. Squier wrote that Joe Martin adored his trainer "Pudgy" and despised his past trainer "Red Gallagher," who had once whipped him and burned him with a hot poker. In "Joe Martin, Gentleman!", Squier documented two additional assaults; she also witnessed Joe Martin defend a weaker animal from a bully, rescue an endangered human baby, and earn the respect of his sworn enemy.

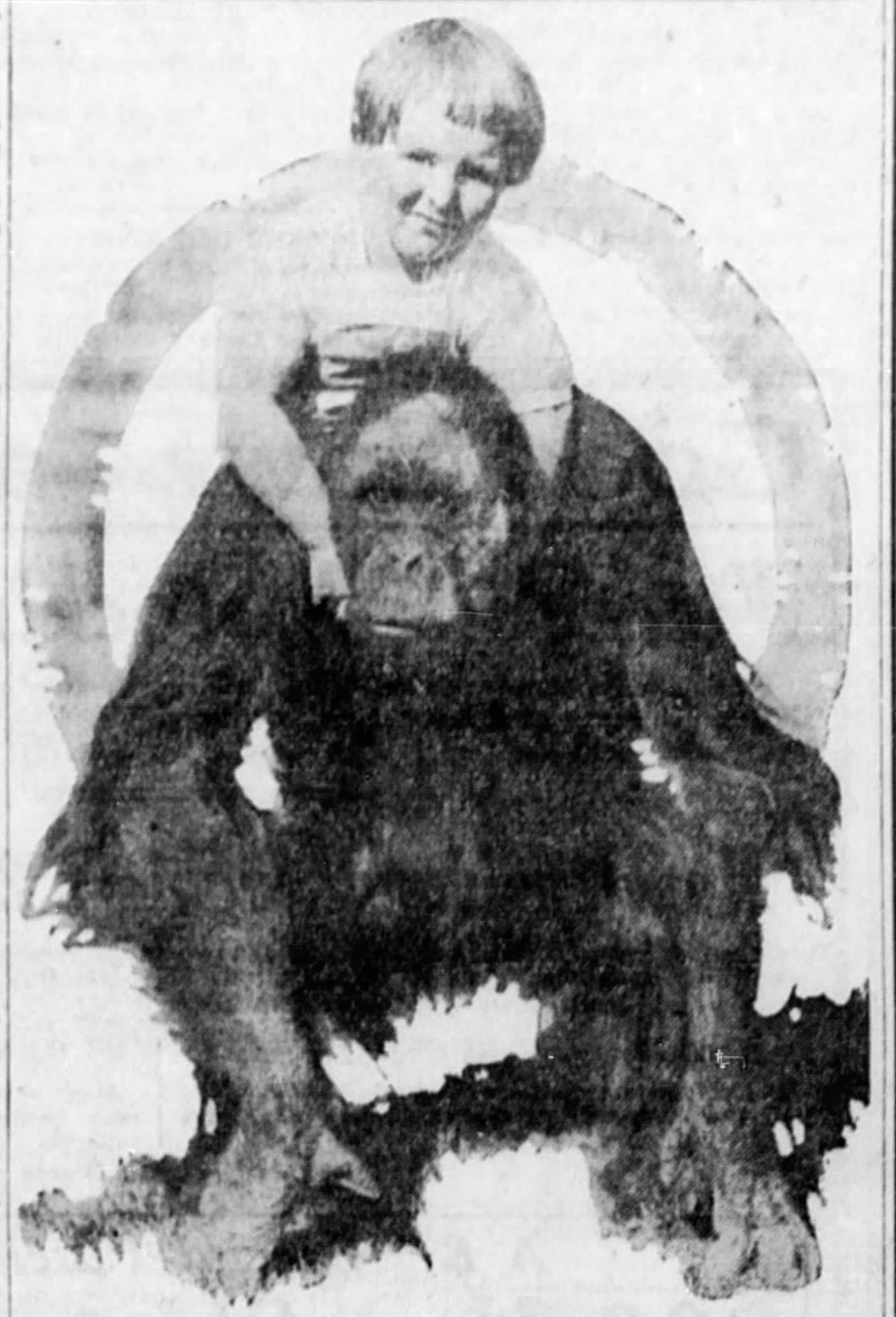
Joe Martin with child performer Edwin Hubbell; printed in 1924 with a caption reporting that Joe Martin had "gone bad"

During the filming of Trifling Women (1922), there was another altercation. Joe Martin played a sidekick of Barbara La Marr's character; Joe Martin and La Marr got along well, and Joe Martin did not react well when La Marr had scenes with her human male costars. Joe Martin bit his costar Edward Connelly while they were shooting a scene where Connelly's character put a necklace around La Marr's neck. Emma-Lindsay Squier reported that he had worked all day and "far into the night" and that "the nature of the scene was a constant tantalization to him" as it involved Edward Connelly taking away "a string of pearls given him in play by the heroine". A different account claims that Joe Martin was irritated at being refused a tumbler of water that Connelly was drinking, and that he almost knocked over La Marr to get to Connelly. A report in Photoplay stated that Stecker had told Connelly not to give Joe Martin the water because "he only drinks warm water and it's not good for him." Joe Martin waited until Stecker's back was turned to leap at Connelly. It took Stecker and three property men a full 10 minutes to get Joe Martin off Connelly. Joe Martin drew blood, possibly broke Connelly's arm and "mangled" his hand. Film editor Grant Whytock later recalled, "It took three of us twisting [Joe Martin's] balls to make him let go." During the Trifling Women incident Joe Martin apparently also bit Curley Stecker. Stecker told Squier that even though he gave Joe Martin a "prompt and thorough beating after the unfortunate episode," Joe Martin did not seem to hold a grudge. Cinematographer John F. Seitz used matte processing to finish the film's remaining scenes between Joe Martin's character Hatim-Tai and Connelly's Baron François de Maupin.

In December 1922, Stecker discussed Joe Martin's mental health and changing behavior with the New York Tribune:

Well, [monkeys] develop a tendency to become grouchy as they get older. You take Joe Martin. He used to lead little children by the hand and be the ladies' pet. Now we daren't let one near him, ever since he carelessly fastened his teeth into the director of another company which rented him. We don't make him work when he doesn't feel like it. And that's most of the time lately, because his mind is fixed on getting married, and we have imported his bride at great expense [...] He's had his way too much, like some humans, and it's made him selfish and ornery; but with a spry young lady orang-outang in the cage it will be different.

On April 23, 1923, while filming The Brass Bottle, Charlie the Elephant "went berserk". Charlie "turned on his trainer...picked him up and dashed him to the ground. As Charlie tried to kneel on Stecker to crush him, a stagehand struck the enraged elephant with a pitchfork, and the trainer was rescued." Stecker suffered lacerations, contusions, rib fractures, and a concussion. Charlie the Elephant was euthanized in autumn 1923. Stecker died the following year from leukemia, with "wild animal injury" listed as a complicating factor on his death certificate. At the time of Charlie's attack on Curley Stecker, Joe Martin was already "regarded as insane".

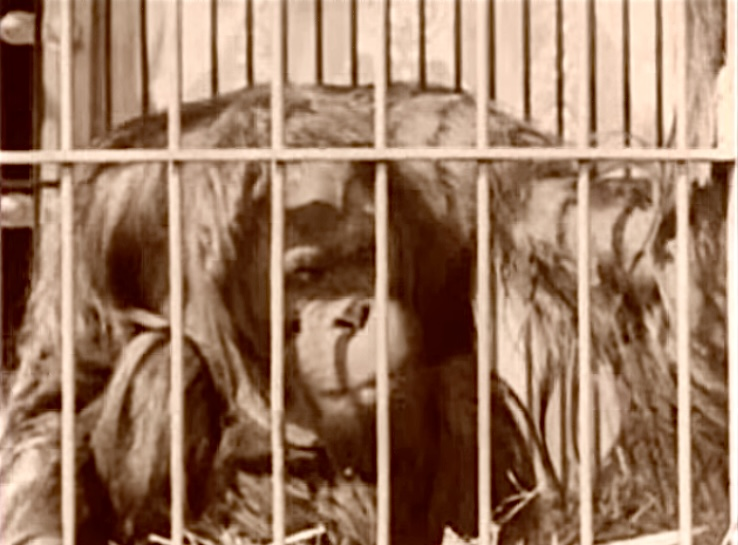
Joe Martin played an enforcer in Merry-Go-Round (1923).

The studio wanted Joe Martin to appear in Merry-Go-Round (1923) but director Erich Von Stroheim refused to work with him. After about a quarter of the movie had been filmed, producer Irving Thalberg fired Von Stroheim for several reasons, including "totally inexcusable and repeated acts of insubordination". Von Stroheim was replaced by with Rupert Julian. Joe Martin appeared in the film, but "virtually all of the footage of Joe in the picture has him by himself ... it's obvious that Universal ... strictly limited his interaction with other performers." A review in The New York Times mentioned that the movie featured a "great orang-outang—too big, but made to appear very real."

=== 1923–1927: Barnes Circus and Barnes City Zoo ===
In November 1923, Charles B. Murphy replaced Curley Stecker as head animal trainer at Universal. On December 31, 1923, Joe Martin was sold to the Al G. Barnes Circus. According to Camera!, Universal studio chief Carl Laemmle "reluctantly" consented to the sale "on the circus man's assurance that the big ape would always have a proper home and good treatment." The deal was made by Harley Tyler, the Barnes Circus "fixer". Universal claimed the price was $25,000 (equivalent to $472,412 in 2025). In his memoir, Barnes said he paid $5,000. The Ringling Brothers and other circuses had been offered the opportunity to buy Joe Martin but passed. A 1950 article asserted that Barnes bought Joe Martin as a counter to Ringling's acquisition of the gorilla John Daniel II. The studio magazine, Universal Weekly, reported that the sale was necessary because Joe Martin had "developed temperament and temper...a sudden savage sullenness which made it dangerous for any human actor to work with him." Camera! reported, "Charles Murphy, the first man to put him in pictures, ushered him out of pictures, loading him into a cage on a circus truck".

Early 20th-century American circus animals were broadly divided into two groups: the performing or working animals, such as elephants that appeared in the center ring and also hauled equipment, and the menagerie animals that had a more passive role as a sideshow attraction. Joe Martin was likely a menagerie animal. According to Bandwagon, Joe Martin "was billed by Barnes' show as monkey, chimpanzee, or gorilla, but seldom as an orang-utang which photos from those years prove he was." Summers were spent touring western North America by rail; winters were spent at the Barnes Zoo in southern California.

In 1924, Joe Martin's first year with Barnes, George Emerson, who had previously been employed by Universal Zoo, was responsible for his care. Billboard reported that Joe Martin was being billed as "the greatest movie star of them all" and that "Dr. Gunning, who attends him, says he is in the pink of condition." Lorena Hickok described Joe Martin as a "broken and discouraged monkey" in a "narrow cage under the canvas out on the hot, dusty, old circus lot".

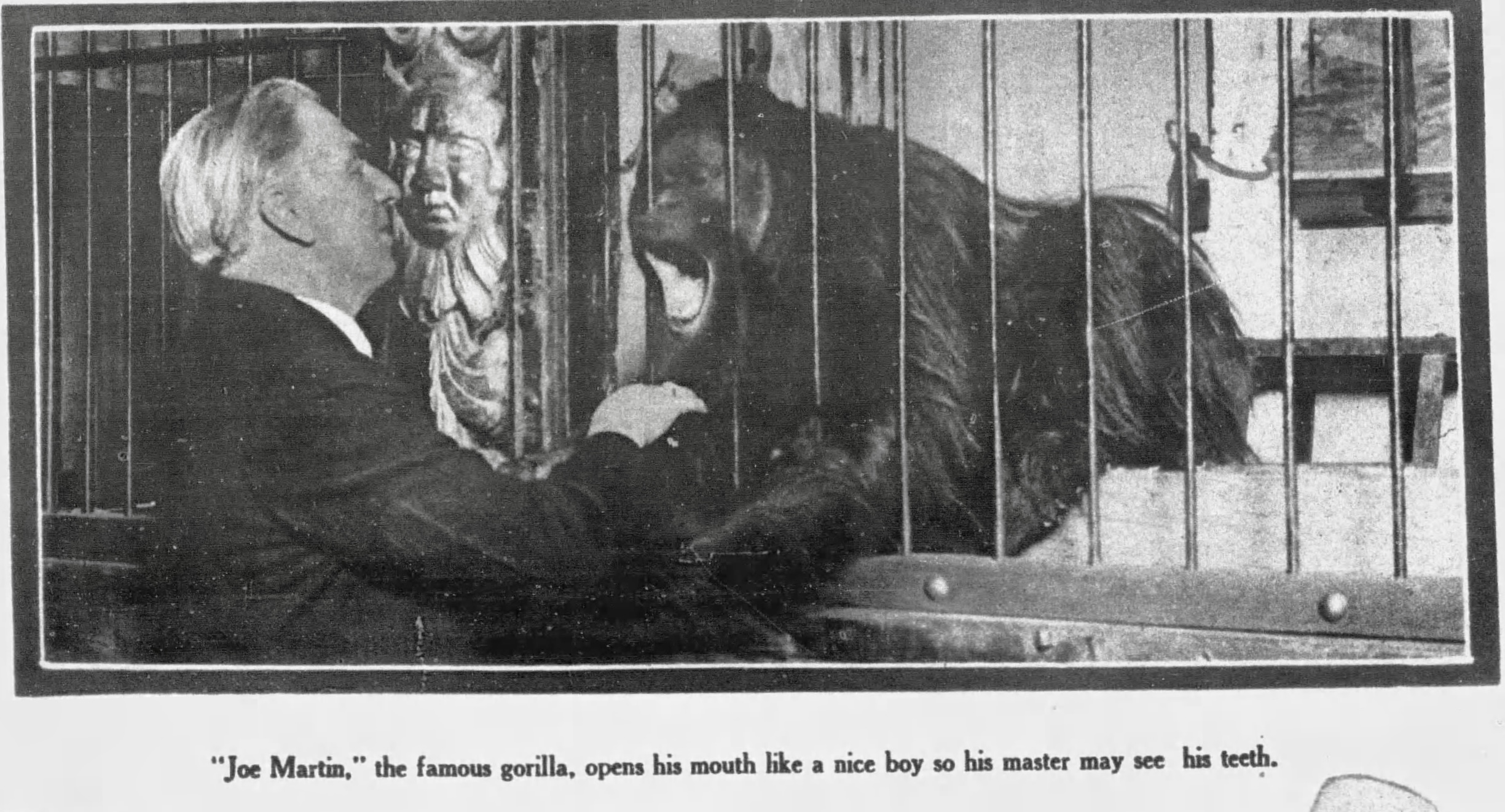
"Joe Martin, gorilla," in a Los Angeles Times photo feature

A 1925 news report claimed that "no fewer than four persons were constantly engaged in looking after Joe's comfort." A later report clarified that Joe Martin's care probably involved three men holding a 2 in (5.1 cm)-thick iron chain attached to a collar around his neck. A photograph of an orangutan with cheek pads baring his teeth at Al G. Barnes appeared in a March 1925 photo feature in the Los Angeles Times. Around May 1925, Billboard reported that Joe Martin was the feature attraction of the Barnes menagerie and that a person named Joe Coleman was in charge of his education. In June, in the presence of a group of reporters, Joe Martin dressed himself in a suit, struck a match, lit his own cigarette, and enjoyed a bottle of pop at the prompting of his trainer E.L. "Blacky" Lewis.

In January 1926, a reporter visiting the Barnes Zoo mentioned that Joe Martin was "trying to tear his cage apart". Joe Martin was still touring with Barnes during the summer circus season in 1926. A Wisconsin newspaper reported that Joe Martin rode in the circus parade route with a guard and a chain around his neck. Joe Martin wore a black suit and a plug hat for the parade and "he doffed this hat courteously to the crowds." Joe Martin now weighed 180 to 190 pounds (82 to 86 kg), was as "strong as an ox," and was a "mean brute"—his keeper's hand had recently been bitten and was bandaged.

Joe Martin briefly escaped during a 1927 circus stand in California. To the shock of the assembled crowd, he initially charged a group of stake drivers, but then, "in his ape-like slouching amble", changed direction and seized trapeze artist Babette Letourneau by the arms. Letourneau reportedly screamed and fainted. Former heavyweight champion James J. Jeffries was on the scene because he and another heavyweight boxer, Tom Sharkey, were doing an exhibition match as part of the show. As witnessed by an alleged 400 members of the circus troupe, Jeffries ran at Joe Martin bellowing "Let go there—" which led Joe Martin to drop LeTourneau. Jeffries then swung at Joe Martin with his right but missed and lost his balance, at which point Joe Martin jumped on his back, holding on with his hind feet. Jeffries then threw himself backwards to the ground, hard enough to knock the wind out of Joe Martin. Jeffries got back up, and Joe Martin did too, but, in the words of the sports-page writer, "this time Jeffries in his famous crouch was ready." Jeffries knocked down Joe Martin with a punch, and then clambered on top of him and beat him unconscious. The orangutan was returned to his circus wagon, and was largely uninjured "except for a cut and swollen eye...He is not so lively, however, and seems to be brooding."

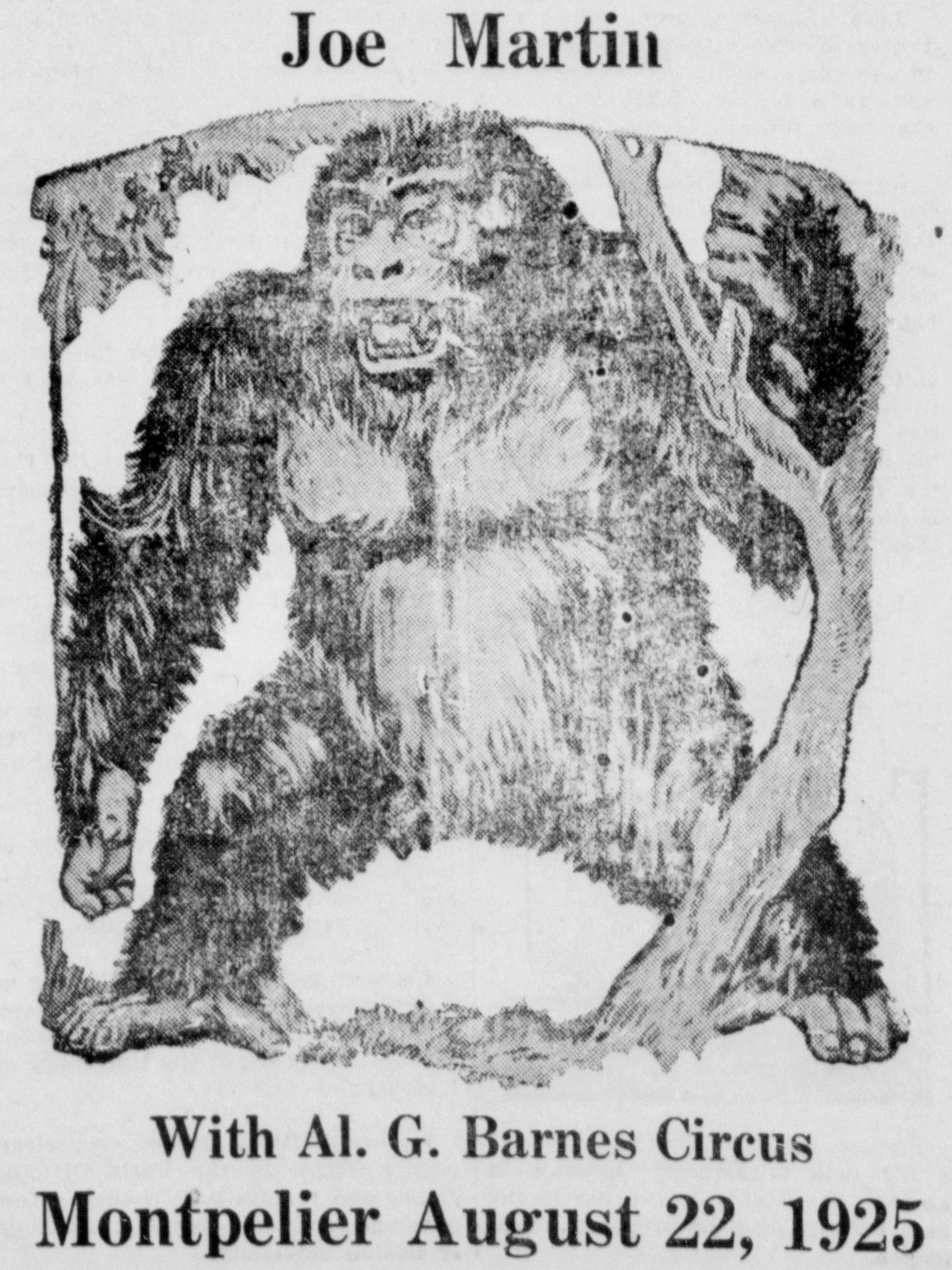
Newspaper advertisement depicting Barnes' "Giant Gorilla Man"

== Health issues ==
In November 1918, as the Spanish flu pandemic reached the west coast and Universal and other studios shut down for a month to prevent further spread, Joe Martin was infected with the virus but was "narrowly saved" from death by double pneumonia through the combined efforts of Dr. Richard Goodwin (Note: For more on Goodwin and his association with the entertainment industry see the Pet Historian blog by University of Delaware professor Katherine C. Grier, the author of Pets in America (2006).) and Curley Stecker. A film magazine said that while he was ill, Joe Martin "wasted away to the form of a skeleton." Three years after the fact, a Boston paper reported that Joe Martin had "hovered between life and death" for nearly three weeks, but "all day, and frequently through the long nights of his illness, Stecker remained within the cage with him." Afterward, Billboard reported that Joe Martin wore a flu mask in the hopes of reducing transmission to the other animals in the menagerie.

Joe Martin was at the studio for approximately a decade and for the most part remained in robust health, despite the historic fragility of captive orangutans. In addition to his bout with influenza, he apparently once stole a spiked bowl of punch from a banquet scene and was ill for the remainder of the day; a day of filming where he continuously smoked a cigar made him similarly ill. Joe Martin also suffered "Klieg eyes," a reaction to the brightness of the sound-stage lights. He was spotted wearing an arm sling in 1919, supposedly because he fell off a roof and sprained his wrist. Joe Martin also suffered electrical burns to his hands in 1919 after he escaped a film shoot, climbed a power pole, chewed on the rubber insulation of the copper wires, and then began swinging along the lines as if he were in a forest canopy. Universal City shut off the electricity, and assistant director Harry Burns climbed up the pole and rescued the "partially-paralyzed" animal.

=== 1928–1931: Last reports ===
The Barnes City zoo closed in 1927 and winter quarters were relocated further inland to Baldwin Park. New language in Barnes advance ads of summer 1928 said that Joe Martin was "the most valuable zoological specimen in captivity today". On January 5, 1929, Barnes sold his operation to American Circus Corporation. Eight months later, in September 1929, American Circus sold Barnes and four other traveling circus brands to Ringling. The combination of the debt-financed purchase and the post-Great Crash collapse in ticket revenue was devastating for the circus business generally and John T. Ringling's fortune specifically. Al G. Barnes died of pneumonia in July 1931. (The Barnes brand continued to tour the country by railroad until 1938 when it was subsumed into Ringling.)

Joe Martin resurfaced briefly in 1931 in a Time magazine film column calling him "innocent, obedient, [and] clever" and that he was sold "when he became unmanageable, began to annoy other Universal monkeys." Time also reported that Joe Martin may have been bought to perform in The Murders in the Rue Morgue, but the part ultimately went to two ape-costumed humans and, for close-ups, a chimpanzee from the Selig Zoo.

In 1935, an Idaho publisher printed Al Barnes' memoirs, as told to author Dave Robeson, while Barnes was dying in the desert city of Indio, California.

[Joe Martin] would wear a man's clothing and eat in a civilized manner, using his dishes and cutlery in the formal way. He was fond of whisky and cigars. As he strolled about the circus tent, walking upright like a man, puffing a cigar and swinging a cane, he attracted a lot of attention and proved to be a great drawing card...His bed was built for a human being and Joe comported himself like a man, sleeping in pajamas in apparent enjoyment...His act of expectorating was especially comical and he chewed tobacco as if it had been a lifetime habit...Joe was several times used to advertise automobiles, and the spectacle he made, sitting in the cars as if he owned them, provided great publicity for the automobile companies.

— Dave Robeson, Al G. Barnes, Master Showman (1935), pp. 102–103

Barnes also tells of a rampage that ended in Joe Martin being punched out by a boxer, and of Joe Martin getting tangled in his own clothes while having an outburst. The book's illustrations 360 and 361 are photos of Joe Martin (orangutan) in his circus-wagon cage, alternately shaking hands with Al Barnes and "alone, in a pensive mood". There is a surviving poster in the Tibbals Circus Collection of the Ringling Museum that reads "Giant Gorilla Man: The Largest Specimen of its Kind in All the World featuring 'Joe Martin (himself)'".

Given the Time report, 1931 is a conservative estimated year of death for Joe Martin. Joe Martin's estimated birthyear predates by five years the earliest historical record in the International Orangutan Studbook, but even with a most-conservative birth year of 1914 and most-conservative death year of 1927, Joe Martin may well have been one of the longest-lived orangutans in overseas captivity in the era that closed with the advent of modern recordkeeping.

== Filmography ==
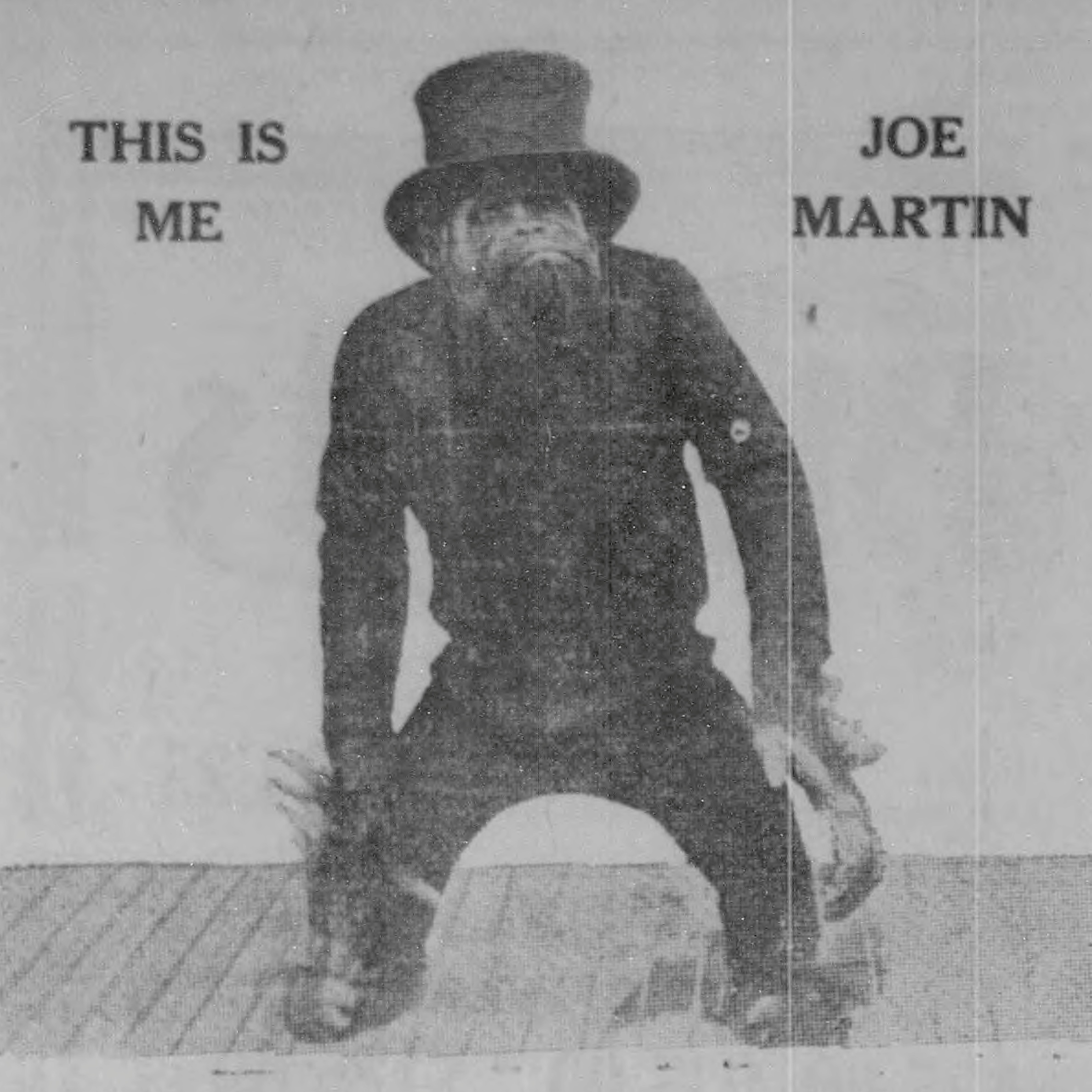
Newspaper advertisement for Jazz Monkey (1919)

Joe Martin had reportedly appeared in over 100 movies by the end of 1919. Joe Martin and the other animals of the Universal City Zoo were used in tropical adventure movies, historical epics, circus pictures, or simply to add a gothic element to melodramas or horror films.

According to "noted animal director" William S. Campbell, two-reel comedy shorts with humans could be shot in eight to 10 days, while animal comedies took upwards of a month. Campbell used live chamber music, played within hearing but out of sight of his ape performers in order to elicit appropriate facial expressions during emotional scenes. According to the primary history of Century Comedies, William S. Campbell's shorts were likely the apogee of Joe Martin-centric comedic scenarios, resulting in a decline in quality, exhibitor reception, and revenue after Campbell left Universal to become an independent producer. Nonetheless, Campbell's assistant director Harry Burns carried on the Joe Martin franchise for two more years, generating six more titles, apparently in close cooperation with Curley Stecker.

"Joe Martin monkey picture" was a marketing hook for a spinoff series featuring the chimpanzee Mrs. Joe Martin; Joe Martin possibly appeared in one of the pictures. According to Steve Massa, "It seems likely that the creation of the 'missus' was a way for the studio to insure a regular release schedule of monkey comedies as big money maker Joe Martin was getting more difficult to work with." (Note: Mrs. Joe Martin titles include A Jungle Gentleman (1919), The Good Ship Rock 'n' Rye (1919), Over the Transom (1920), and A Baby Doll Bandit (1920). All of the Mrs. shorts were directed by Fred Fishback and costarred Jimmie Adams.)

=== Gallery ===
Joe Martin filmography
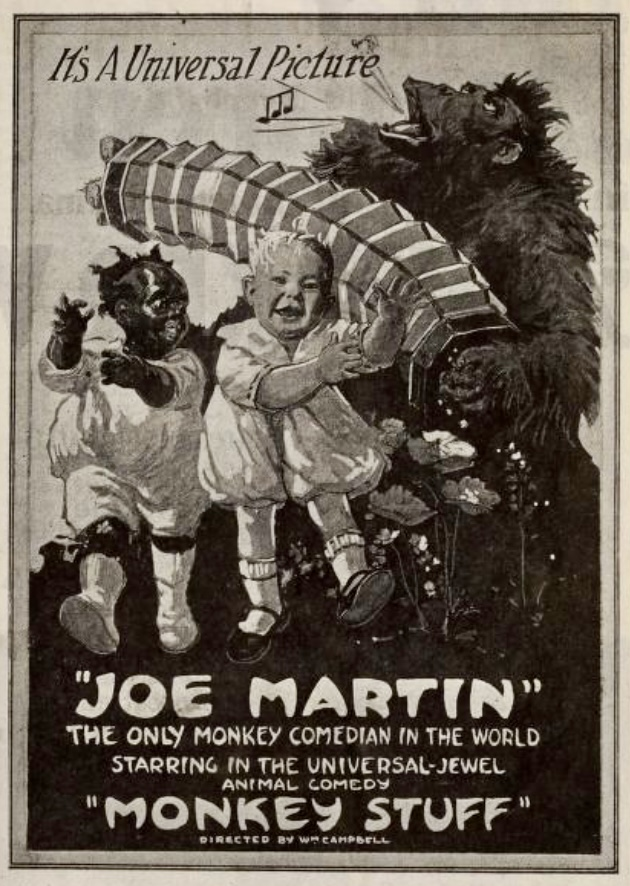
Monkey Stuff, directed by William Campbell

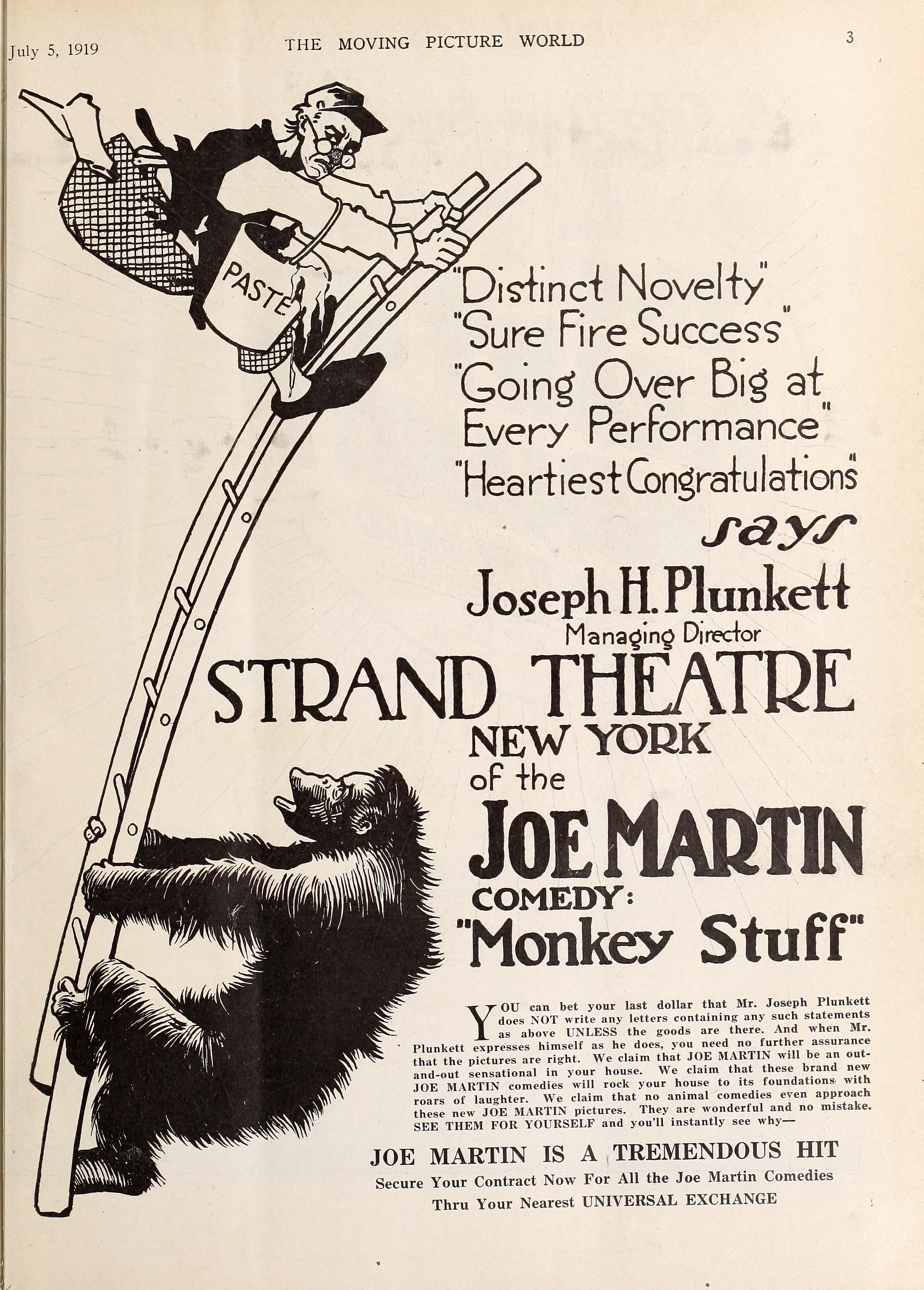
Monkey Stuff at the Strand Theater, New York

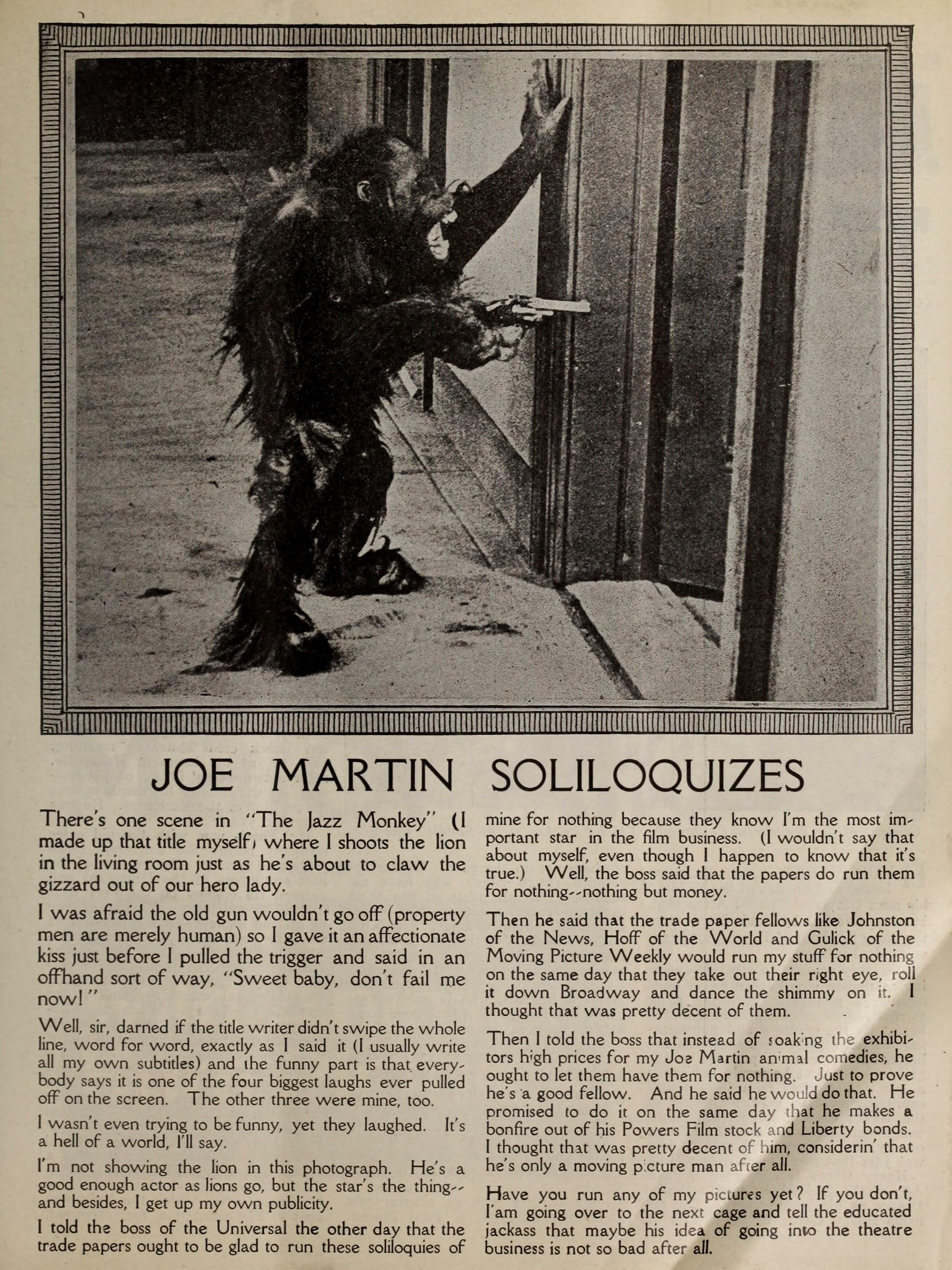
"Joe Martin Soliloquizes" advertisement

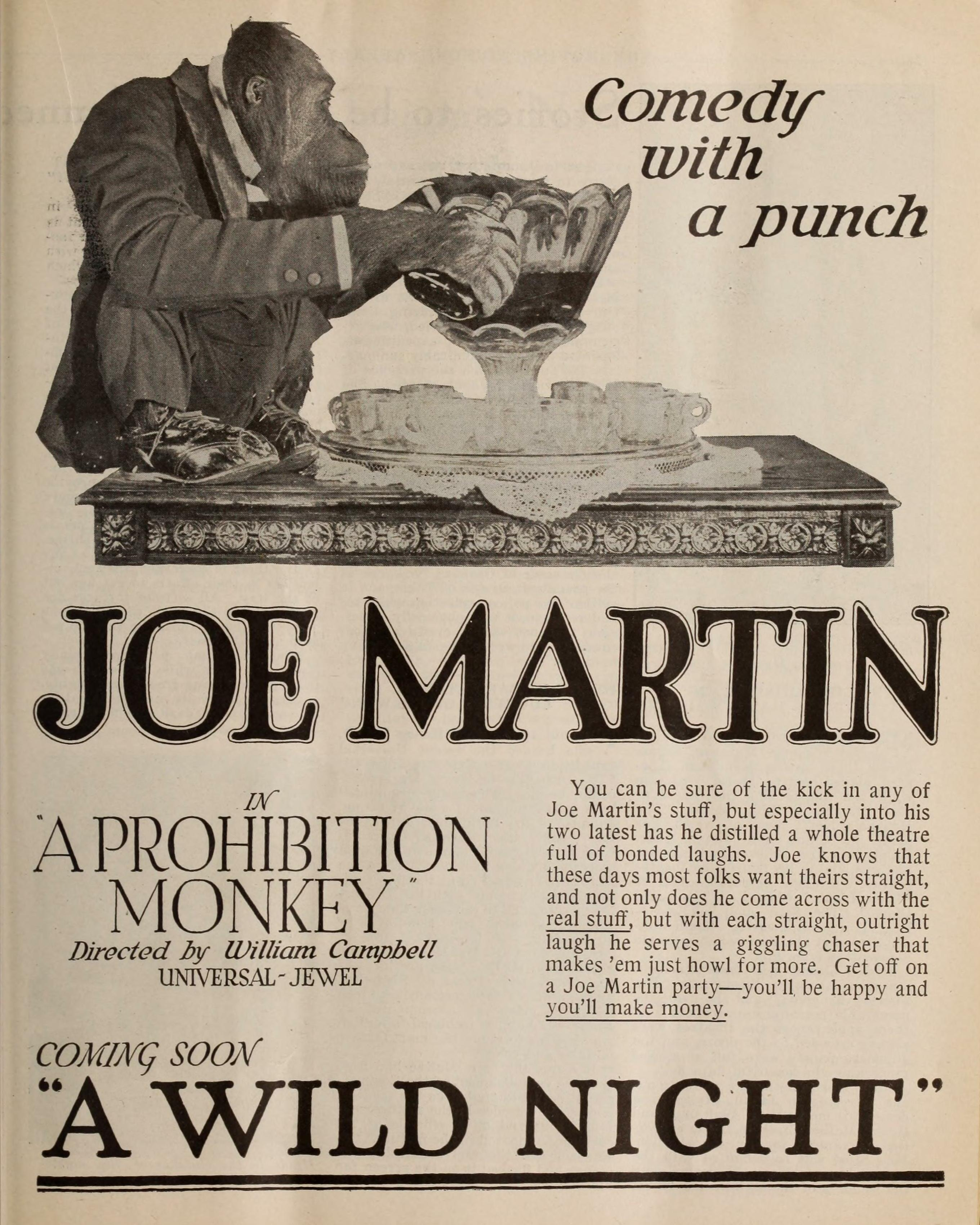
A Prohibition Monkey, and coming soon, A Wild Night

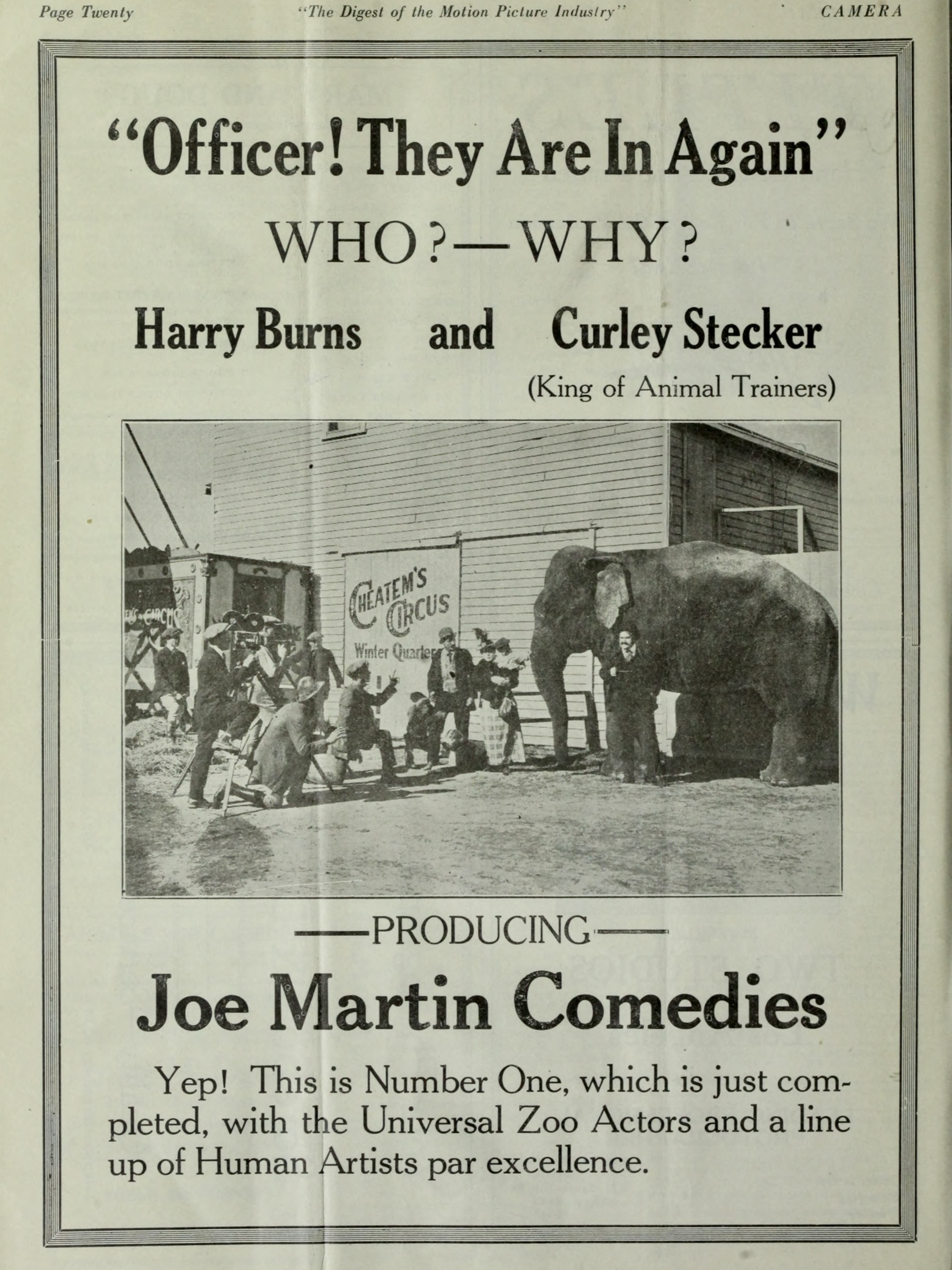
Harry Burns & Curley Stecker producing team, 1920

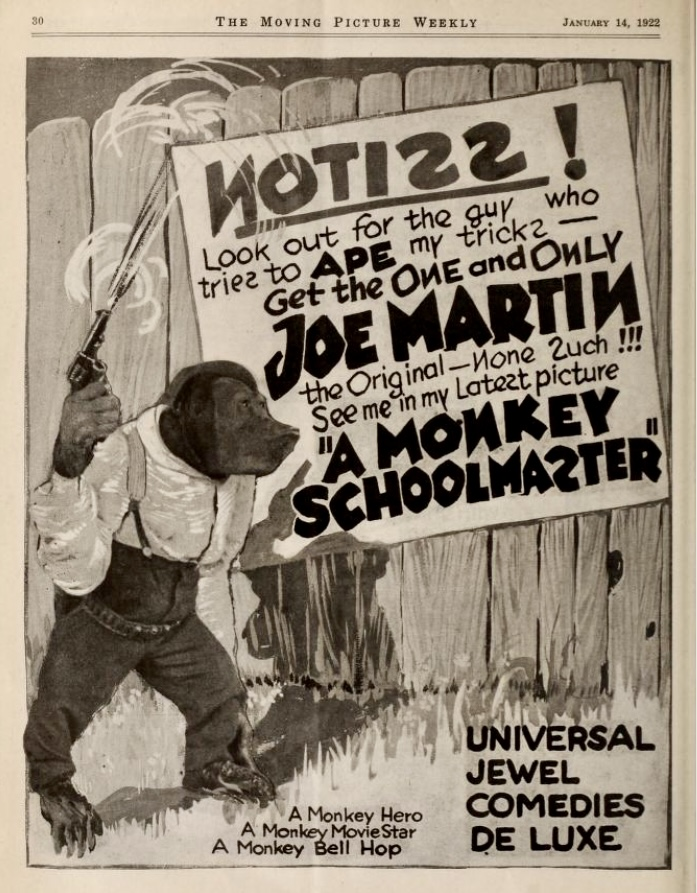
Full-page ad for Joe Martin in A Monkey Schoolmaster

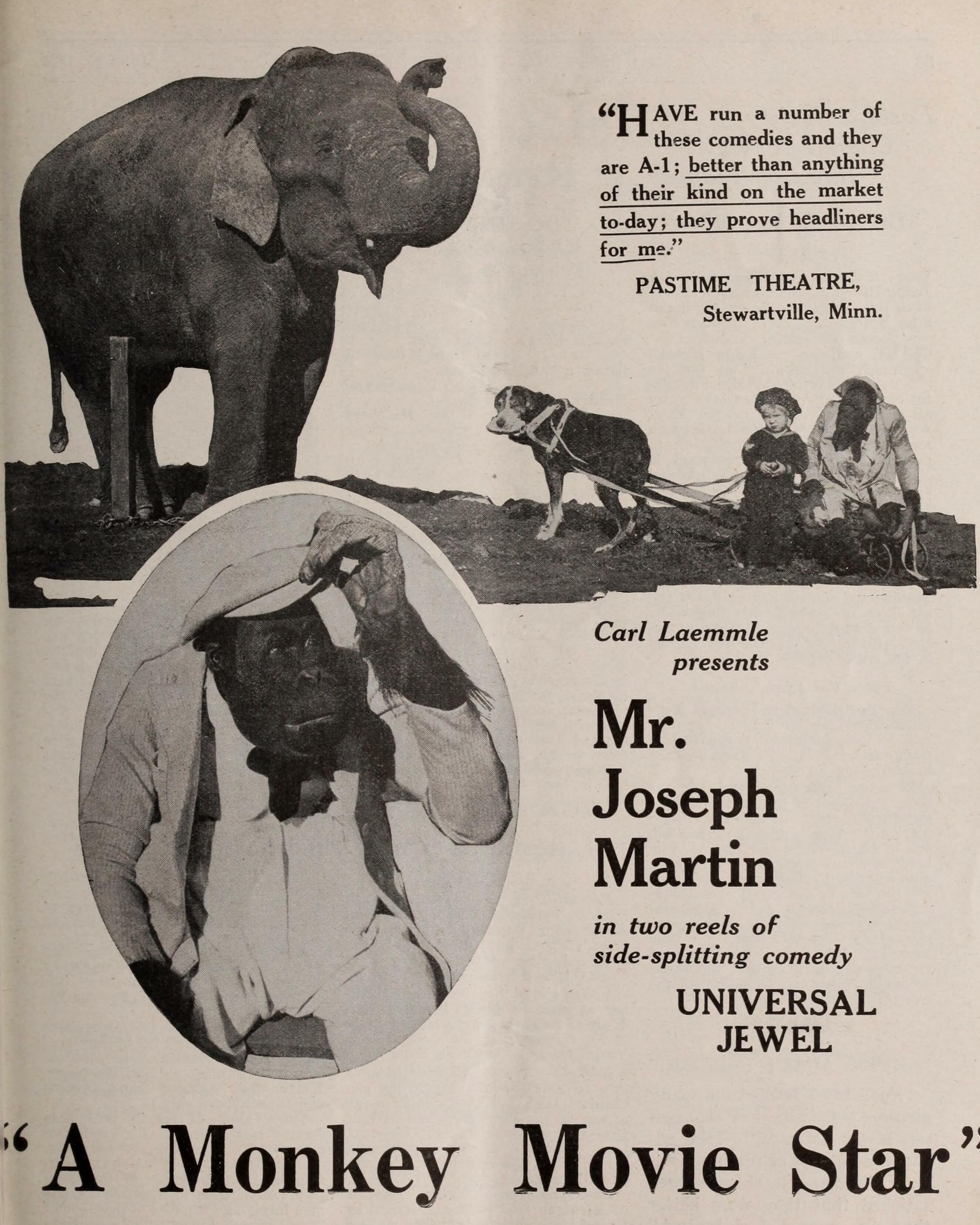
Carl Laemmle Presents Mr. Joseph Martin a Monkey Movie Star

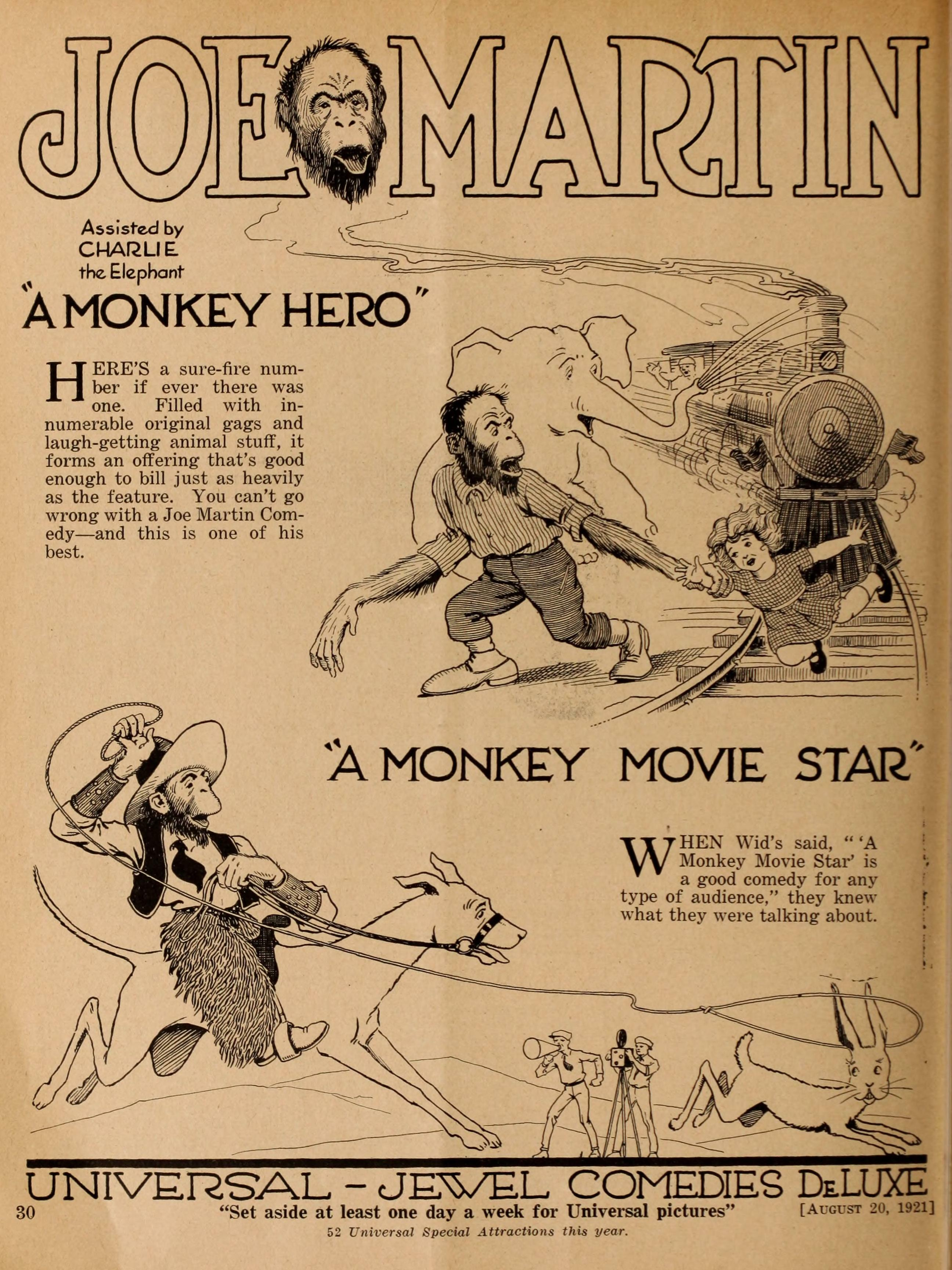
"Assisted by Charlie the Elephant"

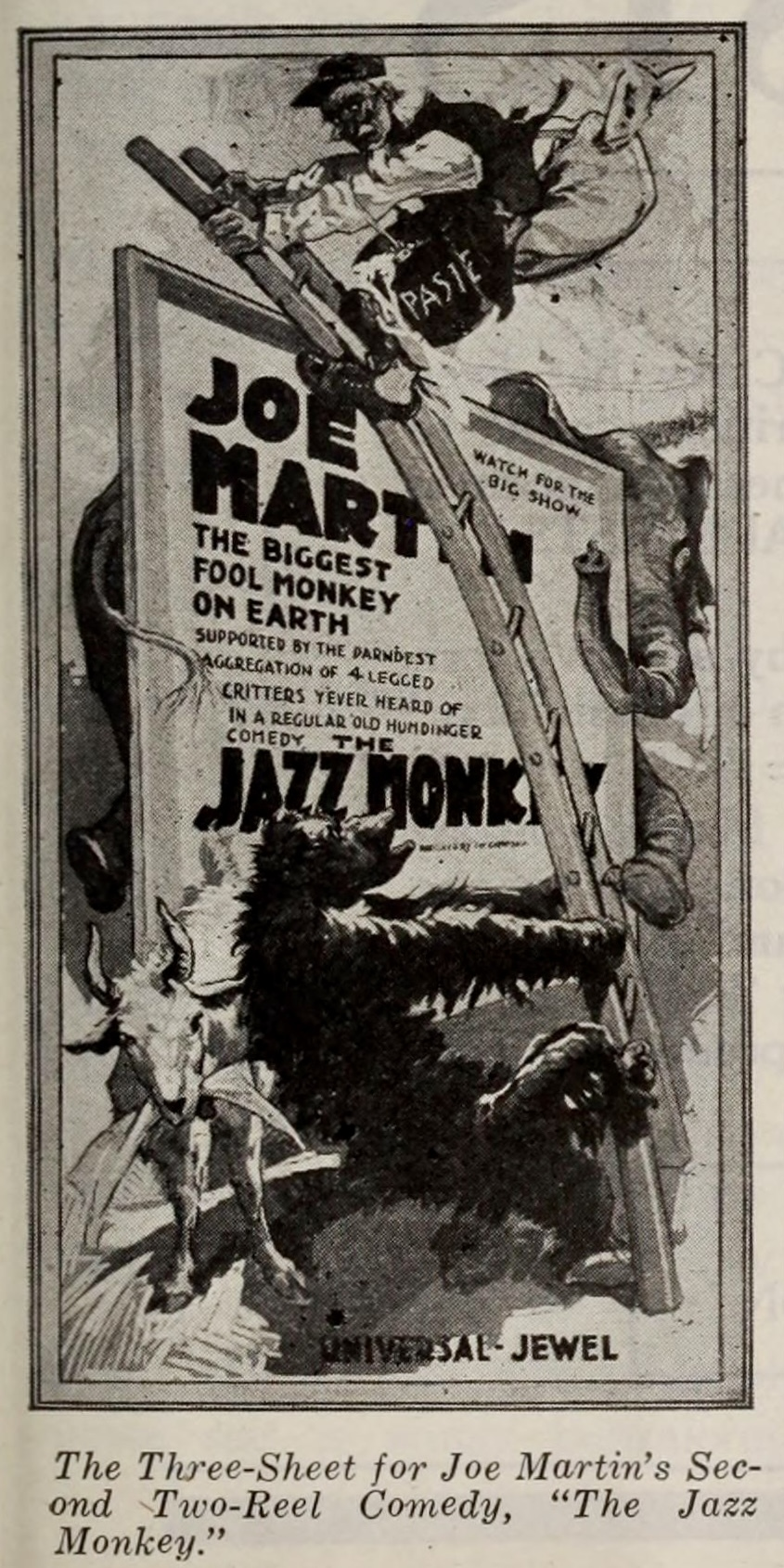
Jazz Monkey three-sheet

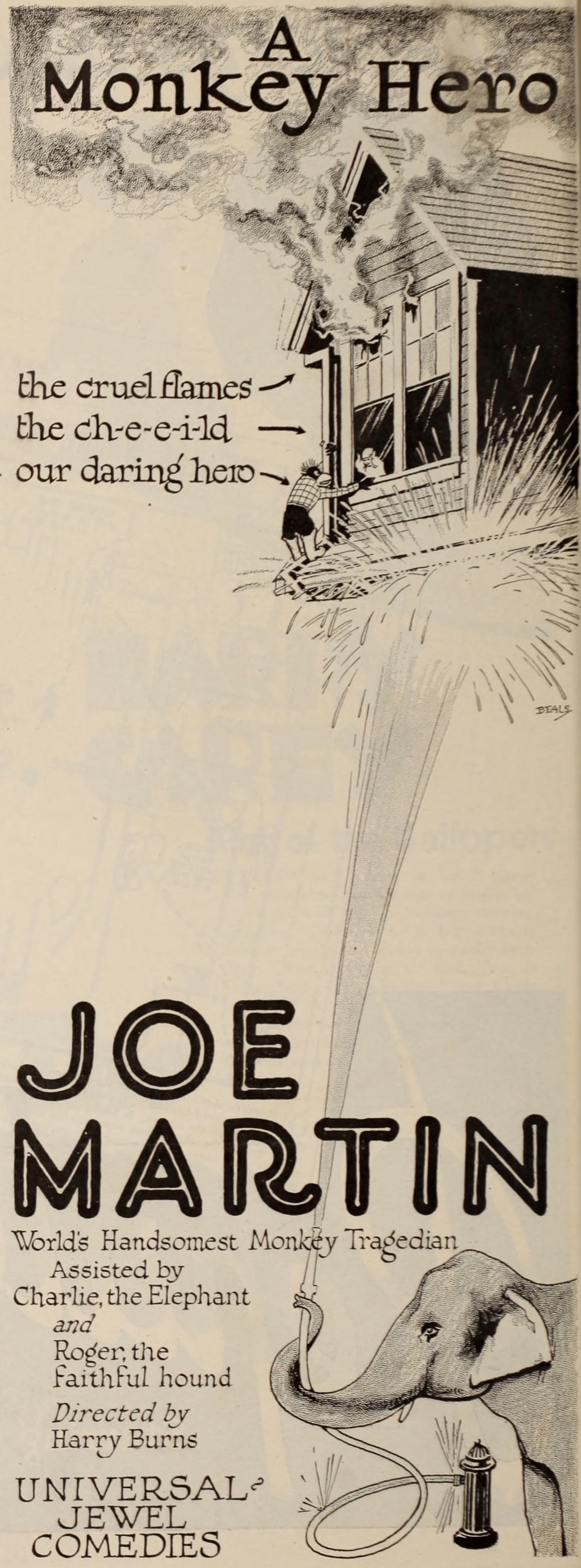
A Monkey Hero, directed by Harry Burns

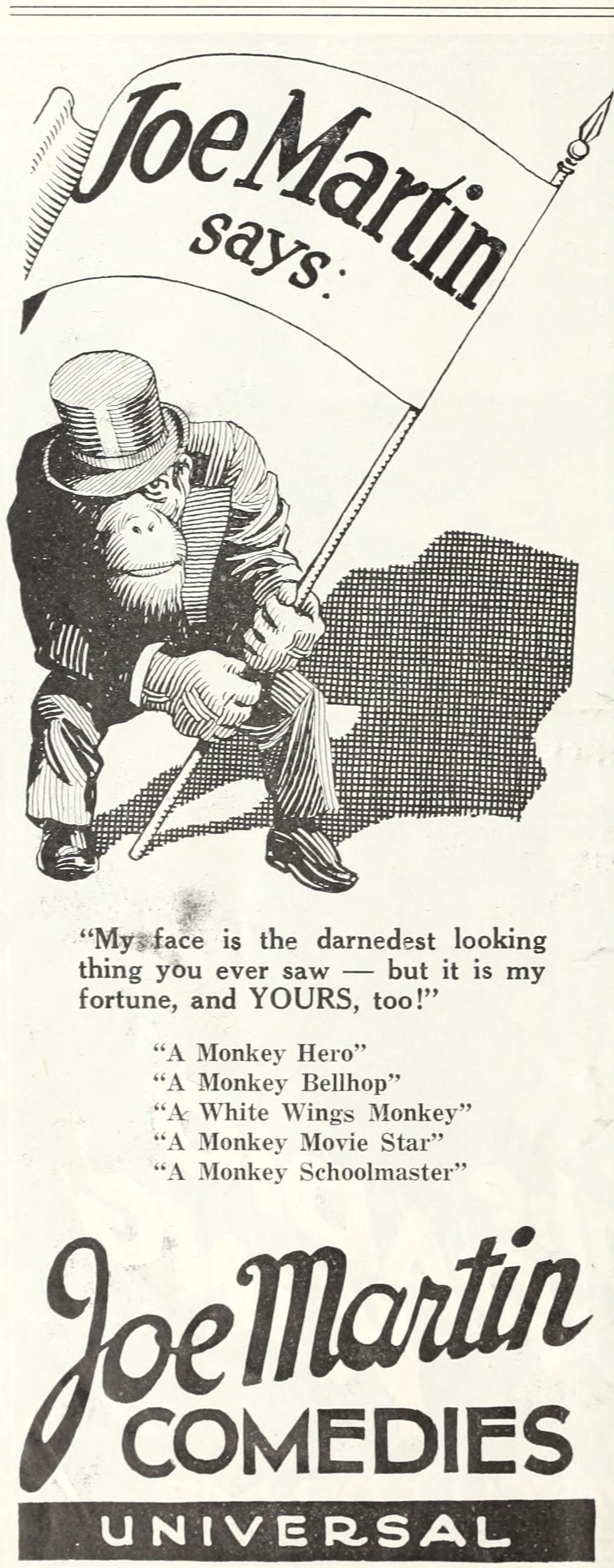
Universal marketing for Joe Martin comedies

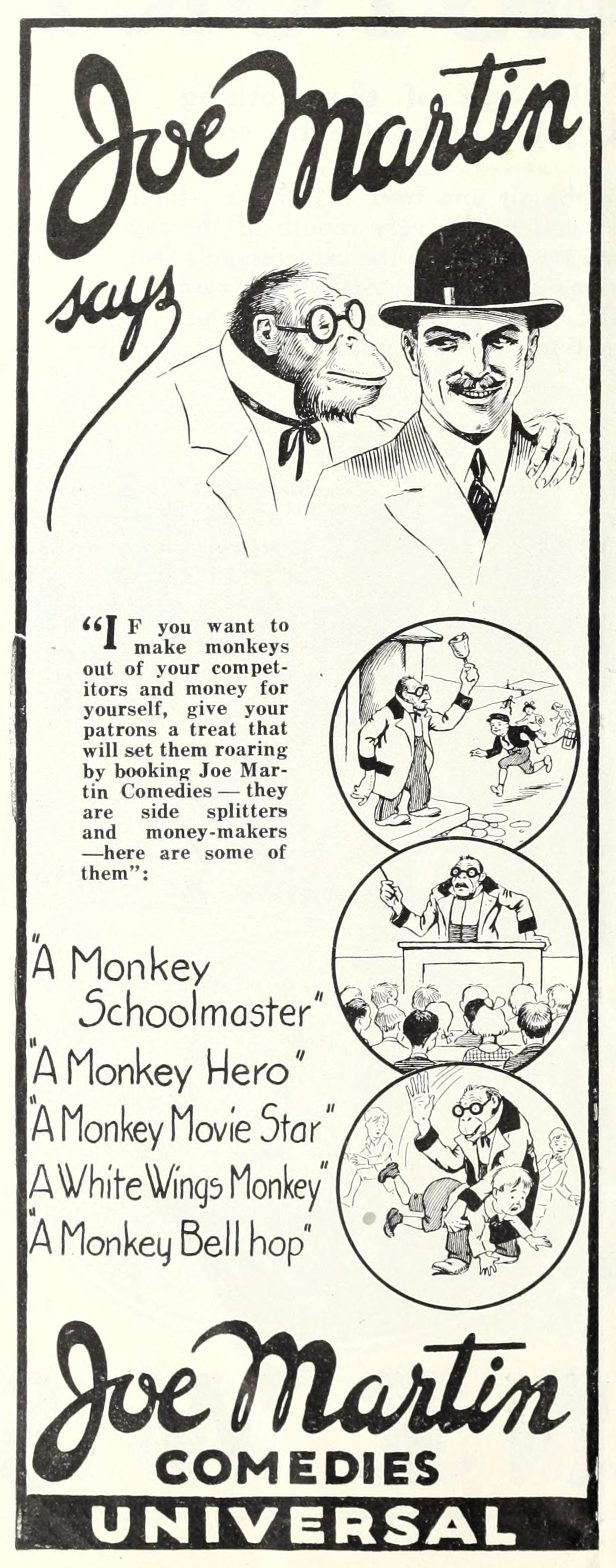
Universal marketing for Joe Martin comedies

== See also ==
- Orangutans in popular culture
- List of individual apes
- List of animals in film and television
- List of Universal Pictures films (1912–1919) and (1920–1929)
- List of film and television accidents
- List of largest non-human primates
- The Playhouse (1921), a comedy short in which Buster Keaton's character steps in for an escaped vaudeville orangutan
- The Chimp (1932), a Laurel and Hardy short about circus and film apes
