= John Daniel =

John Daniel may refer to:

== Animals ==
- John Daniel (gorilla) (1917–1922)
- John Daniel II (gorilla) (1920–1926)

== People ==
- John Daniel (priest) (1745–1823), English Roman Catholic priest
- John Daniel (printer) (1755–1823), Welsh printer
- John Daniel (ship's captain), 17th-century English sea captain
- John A. Daniel (?–2011), American magician
- John Edward Daniel (1902–1962), Welsh theologian and chairman of the Welsh political party Plaid Cymru
- John Moncure Daniel (1825–1865), Virginia newspaper editor
- John Reeves Jones Daniel (1802–1868), U.S. Representative from North Carolina
- John W. Daniel (1842–1910), U.S. Senator from Virginia
- John Waterhouse Daniel (1845–1933), Canadian physician and Conservative politician
- John Daniel, a master founder at the Whitechapel Bell Foundry
- John Danyel or Daniel (1560s–1620s), musician from Somerset, England

== See also ==
- John Daniell (disambiguation)
- John Daniels (disambiguation)
- Jack Daniel (disambiguation)
