= Valerie Harrisse Walter =

American sculptor (1892–1984)

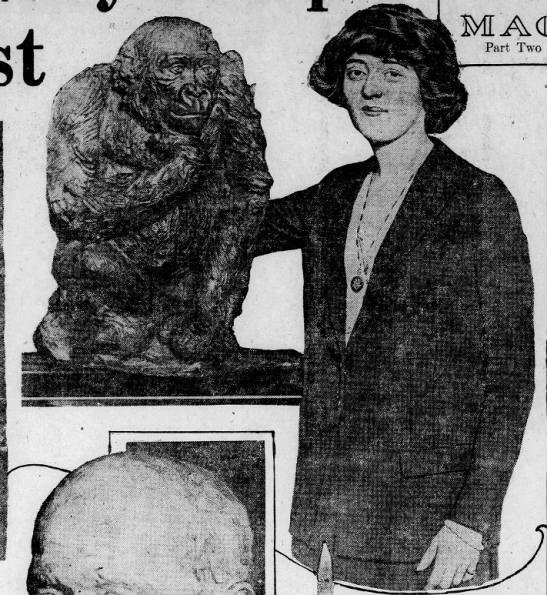
- Valerie Harrisse Walter with her sculpture of the gorilla John Daniel II
- Born: February 15, 1892; Baltimore
- Died: February 29, 1984 (aged 92); Baltimore
- Occupation: Sculptor, artist

Valerie Harrisse Walter (February 15, 1892 – February 29, 1984) was an American sculptor from Baltimore, Maryland. She primarily created portrait busts and sculptures of animals, including dogs and life-sized bronze gorillas.

Valerie Harrisse Walter was born on February 15, 1892 in Baltimore, Maryland, the daughter and one of five children of prominent Jewish lawyer Moses Raphael Walter and Bertha Ulman Walter. She attended Madame Lefebvre's School in Baltimore.

Walter began sculpting at age 17 after her mother bought her a box of clay, which she used to model her dog Fritz. She studied sculpture under Ephraim Keyser at the Maryland Institute and Henry Augustus Lukeman in his New York studio. In 1922, she sailed on the SS Lapland to Paris to study art, along the way completing a bas relief portrait of another passenger, a girl named Genevieve Lymans. In Paris, she completed busts of Riccardo Bertelli of the Roman Bronze Works and Dr. Nicholas Sbarounis Tricorphos, surgeon general of the Greek army.

She worked in Washington, DC for a time, creating a number of portraits of foreign diplomats and their family members, as well as a bust of President William Howard Taft for Taft Junior High School.

In 1924, she met the gorilla John Daniel II from Ringling Brothers, Barnum and Bailey Circus. (He was so named because he was the successor gorilla to John Daniel.) She created a life-sized sculpture of the three-year-old gorilla. She presented it to the Baltimore Zoo in the 1948, and it has been exhibited outdoors on the zoo grounds since 1995.

Valerie Harrisse Walter died on 29 February 1984.
