= John Daniels =

John Daniels may refer to:

- John W. Daniels (1857–1931), co-founder of Archer Daniels Midland
- John T. Daniels (1873–1948), amateur photographer who took the photograph of the Wright Brothers' first flight
- John Karl Daniels (1875–1978), Norwegian-American sculptor
- John C. Daniels (1936–2015), mayor of New Haven, Connecticut
- John Daniels (cricketer) (born 1942), English cricketer
- John Daniels (actor) (born 1945), African American actor
- John Daniels (footballer) (1915–?), English footballer
- Jon Daniels (born 1977), general manager of the American baseball club the Texas Rangers

== See also ==
- John Daniel (disambiguation)
- Jack Daniels (disambiguation)
- Jonathan Daniels (disambiguation)
