= Jack Daniel (disambiguation) =

Jack Daniel (1849–1911) was the founder of the Jack Daniel's whisky distillery.

Jack Daniel may also refer to:

- Jack Daniel (cricketer) (1923–2002), Australian cricketer
- Jack Daniel (DJ), American radio DJ

== See also ==
- Jack Daniel's, a Tennessee Whiskey distillery
- Jack Daniels (disambiguation)
- John Daniel (disambiguation)
