= Jonathan Daniels (disambiguation) =

Jonathan Daniels may refer to:

- Jonathan W. Daniels (1902–1981), White House Press Secretary
- Jonathan Daniels (1939–1965), Episcopal seminarian, killed for his work in the American civil rights movement
- Jon Daniels (born 1977), general manager of the American baseball club the Texas Rangers

== See also ==
- John Daniels (disambiguation)
