= Jack Daniels =

Jack Daniels may refer to:

== People ==
- Jack Daniels (American football) (1906–1977), American football running back
- Jack Daniels (baseball) (1927–2013), Major League Baseball outfielder
- Jack Daniels (coach) (1933–2025), Olympian in the modern pentathlon and a coach for cross-country running
- Jack Daniels (New Mexico politician) (1923–2003), politician from New Mexico
- Jack Daniels (Ohio politician)
- Jack Daniels, guitarist of Highway 101
- Jack Daniels, guitarist of War of Ages
- William Daniels (automotive engineer) (1912–2004), English automotive engineer known as Jack

== Other uses ==
- Jack Daniel's, a brand of whiskey

== See also ==
- Jack Daniel (disambiguation)
- John Daniels (disambiguation)
