= Joe Martin (comic strip) =

Short-lived advertorial newspaper comic

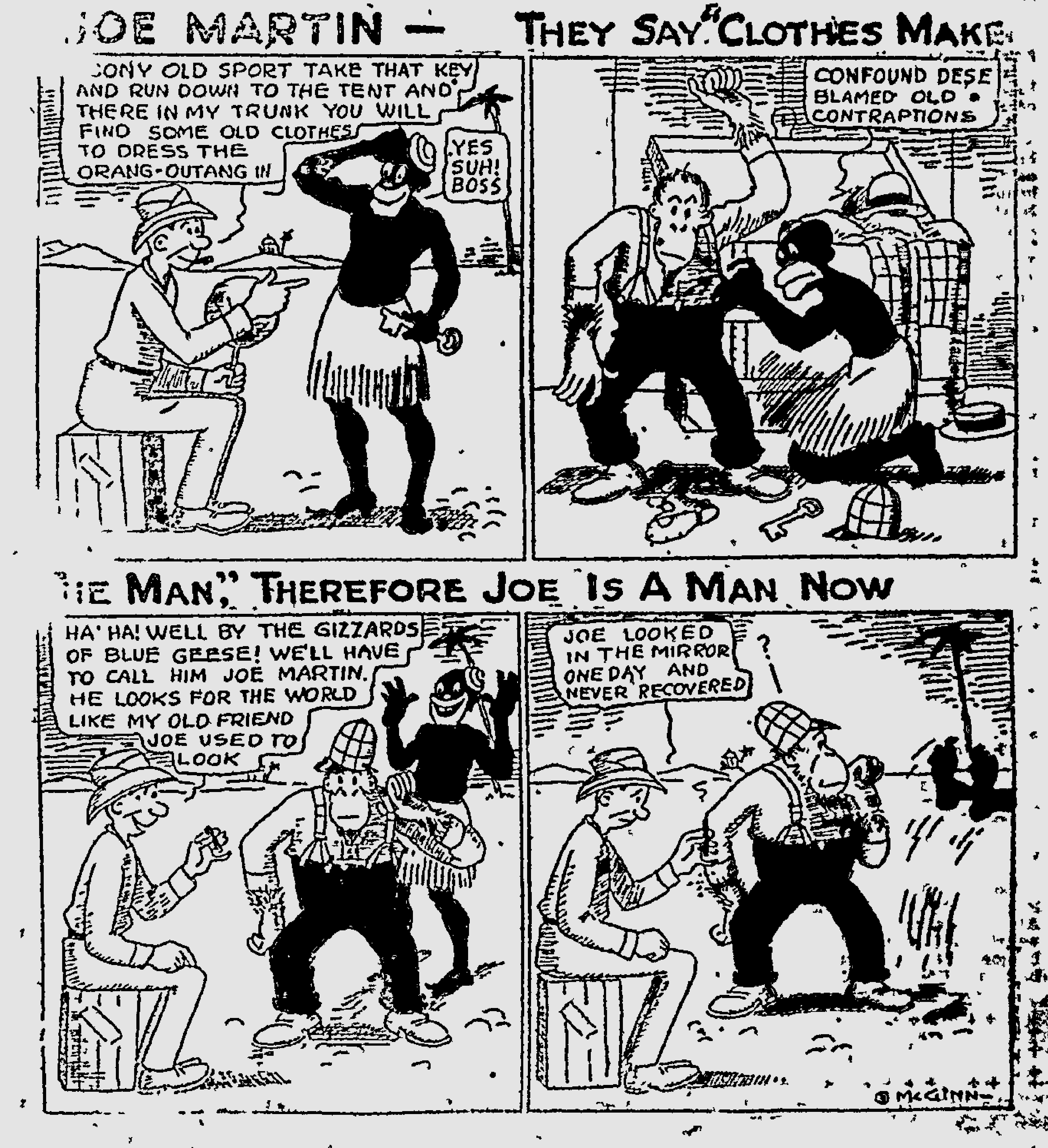
Example of the Joe Martin newspaper comic strip by Forest McGinn (Vernal Express newspaper, Utah, 1921)

Joe Martin was a short-lived newspaper comic strip drawn by Forest McGinn to further market Universal Pictures' celebrity orangutan Joe Martin. The Joe Martin strips were free "six-column mat form" comics issued by Universal to any newspaper that requested them. The Joe Martin comic strip was introduced on or before March 1920 and continued until at least 1921. The strip, sometimes called The Life, Loves and Adventures of Joe Martin was published in newspapers in the United States, Canada, and Sweden.

Contemporary audiences would find the subject matter highly offensive. The comics are period-typical in that "Blacks were the principal comic figures [although] many of the images of 'Blacks' in the first half-century of the comics were not of Blacks at all. Instead they were caricatures derived from [minstrel shows]."
