= John Daniels (footballer) =

English footballer

Personal information
- Full name: John James Daniels
- Date of birth: 1915
- Place of birth: Kent, England
- Height: 5 ft 8 1/2 in (1.74 m)
- Positions: Inside right; outside right

Senior career*
Years	Team	Apps	(Gls)
- Bexley
–1935	Bexleyheath		
1935–1939	Millwall	25	(6)
- Gravesend & Northfleet
- * Club domestic league appearances and goals

John James Daniels (born 1915; date of death unknown) was an English professional footballer who played in the Football League for Millwall as an inside right.

== Personal life ==
Daniels served in the British Army during the Second World War and after his retirement from football, he became a milkman.
