= Pneumonia jacket =

Archaic medical device for treating respiratory infections

A pneumonia jacket was a medical device used to warm the chest of a person with pneumonia. In the pre-antibiotic era, supportive care measures such as fluid support and warming were the only treatments available. Pneumonia jackets were variously constructed of oiled silk, muslin, and sometimes even included a system of rubber tubing that circulated hot water around the chest as a means of keeping the patient warm.

The term was apparently coined by one Charles Wilson Ingraham of Binghamton, New York. He wrote, "In an article published in the New York Medical Journal, May 18, 1895, I called particular attention to a means of applying heat by the use of what I termed the "pneumonia jacket" which consists of an arrangement for the circulation of hot water through coils of rubber tubing, so arranged as to cover the whole chest...it hastens the various stages of the pneumonia process [and] sustains lobular vitality and consequently the lobe will not be so prone to chronic disease or to recurrent attacks of pneumonia."
