= John Daniell =

John Daniell may refer to:

- John Frederic Daniell (1790–1845), English chemist and physicist
- John Daniell (English sportsman) (1878–1963), English cricketer and international rugby union player
- John Daniell (New Zealand rugby player) (born 1972), New Zealand rugby player

== See also ==
- John Daniel (disambiguation)
