= John Daniel (gorilla) =

Human-acculturated gorilla (1917–1922)

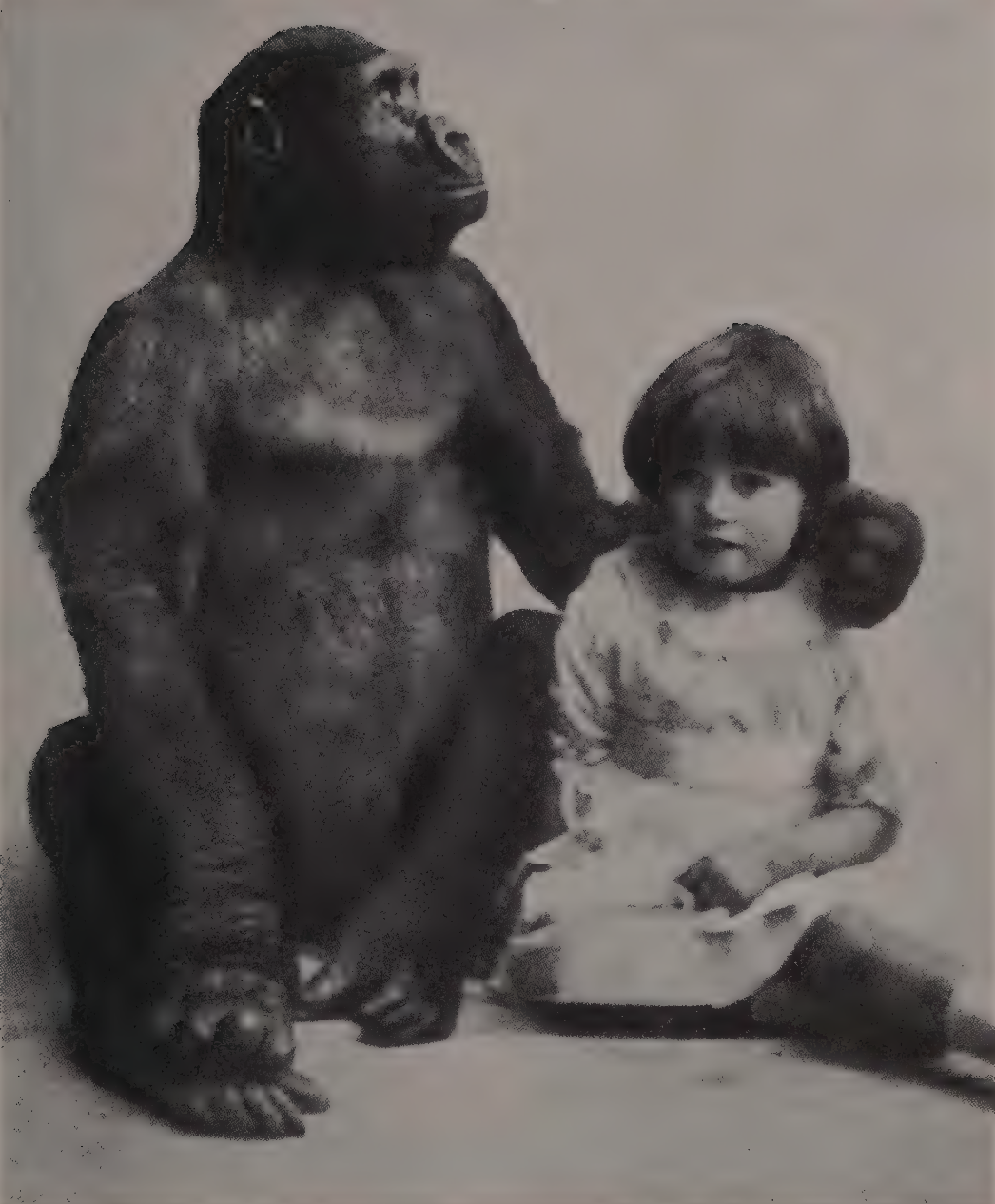
- This photo of John Daniel with a toddler helped counter the reputation of gorillas as ferocious beasts
- Born: 1917; Gabon, French Equatorial Africa
- Died: 1922 (aged 4); New York City, US
- Known for: Living as a human child

John Daniel (1917–1922) was a lowland gorilla who was raised among humans in Uley, England.

John Daniel was born in Gabon. After his mother was shot and killed by soldiers, John Daniel was brought over to England and ended up living with Major Rupert Penny. Unable to look after him full-time however, Penny then passed John Daniel over to his aunt, Alyce Cunningham, who lived in the village of Uley in Gloucestershire. He resided with her in the village from 1918 until 1921.

John Daniel learned to use a toilet, make his bed, and drink tea and cider from cups. He was a playmate to the village children and was allowed to drink cider at the local pub. He also occasionally resided on Sloane Street in London when Cunningham traveled to her home there and would attend dinner parties. He rode in Cunningham's convertible.

When he became too large to manage at 210 lb (95 kg), Alyce Cunningham sold him in 1921 for £1,100 to an American person who misled her to believe the gorilla would be retired to Florida. Instead, John Daniel was placed with Barnum and Bailey Circus. He was later sent to the Ringling Zoo at Madison Square Garden in New York City. Distraught from being away from his home and Cunningham, John Daniel's health worsened. The zoo sent for Cunningham, but she did not arrive in time, and he died of pneumonia at age 4. His body was given to the American Museum of Natural History in New York City and was placed on display in 1922.

A century after he lived in Uley, villagers made plans to erect a statue commemorating him. Stroud District Council granted permission, and the sculpture was unveiled in 2018. It was created by Sebastian Rasch and is made of Portland stone.

== See also ==
- List of individual apes
- Koko (gorilla)
- Alex (parrot)
- Nim Chimpsky
- Washoe (chimpanzee)
- John Daniel II, successor; Cunningham and John Daniel II toured with the circus
