= John Daniel II =

Human-acculturated gorilla (1920–1926)

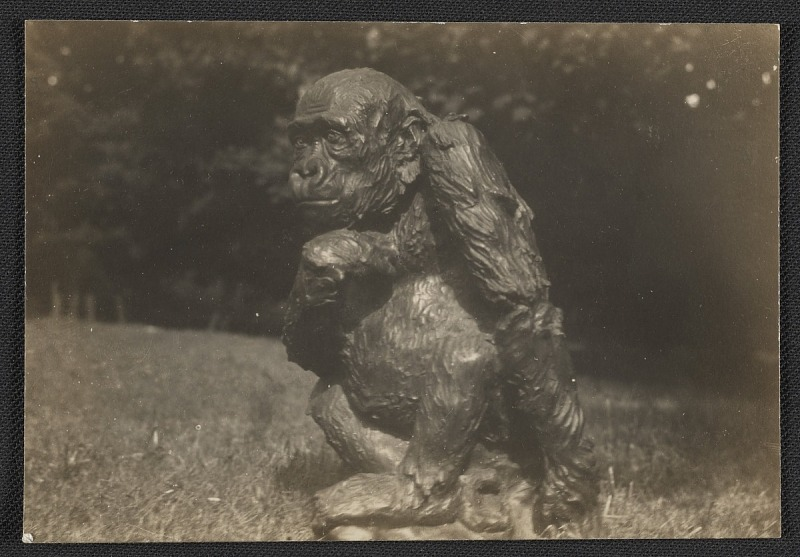
- John Daniel II by Valerie Harrisse Walter (SAAA)
- Other name: Sultan
- Species: Gorilla gorilla
- Sex: Male
- Born: c. 1920; Likely Gabon, French Equatorial Africa
- Died: May 1926; Likely London
- Notable role: Circus and zoo animal
- Years active: 1923–1926
- Owner: Alyce Cunningham

John Daniel II (c. 1920–1926), originally called Sultan, was a Western gorilla who was captured in August 1923 in the French Congo when he was about three years old. The gorilla then passed into the possession of an Englishwoman named Alyce Cunningham, who raised him as a successor to John Daniel I. He toured with Ringling Circus in America and was exhibited at the London Zoo before his death in 1926.

== Biography ==
According to a 1924 press release, John Daniel II was taken from the same "gorilla village" as John Daniel I. John Daniel II reportedly did not like men as a consequence of their involvement in his capture and as such needed a female chaperone at all times. He enjoyed bacon and eggs for breakfast, and took tea at 4 p.m.

John Daniel and Cunningham came to the United States from the UK in early 1924 on the SS Deutschland (1923). John Daniel II lived with Cunningham at the McAlpin Hotel in New York and "even answered the door when visitors called." That summer, John Daniel II and Cunningham toured with the Ringling Brothers and Barnum & Bailey circus. Per a poster held in the Ringling Museum circusiana collection he was advertised as a "Genuine Gorilla from the Wilds of Africa." Valerie Harrisse Walter sketched John Daniel II in his hotel room in 1924. Walter later sculpted him in bronze. American journalist Mildred Seydell often performed palm readings as a gimmick to gain access to interesting interview candidates; John Daniel II was one such subject.

In the winter of 1924, John Daniel II and Cunningham returned to the UK. Press reports had it that John Daniel II was to be married in London to Jenny Lind, a "spinster" gorilla in the possession of Professor T. Alexander Barnes. Circa 1925, John Daniel II weighed about 80 lb (36 kg). John Daniel II was exhibited at the London Zoo in 1925 and/or 1926, traveling to the zoo from his hotel by motorcar or taxi, arriving for his shift around 11 a.m. and leaving around 6 p.m. One newspaper report claimed that John Daniel II, "the great chimpanzee, could smoke a pipe, ride a tricycle, chew tobacco, and tie his necktie."

Daniel II died in London in approximately May 1926. The cause of death was "some internal trouble such as humans suffer from." With the passing of the cosmopolitan John Daniel II, American newspapers reported that the only gorilla remaining in U.S. captivity was Congo, a female eastern gorilla, who was eventually passed into the custody of Robert M. Yerkes.

== See also ==
- List of individual apes
