= Feather Hill Zoo =

Animal collection, Santa Barbara, California (1924–1930)

Coordinates: 34.4366°N 119.6353°W

Feather Hill Ranch Zoo
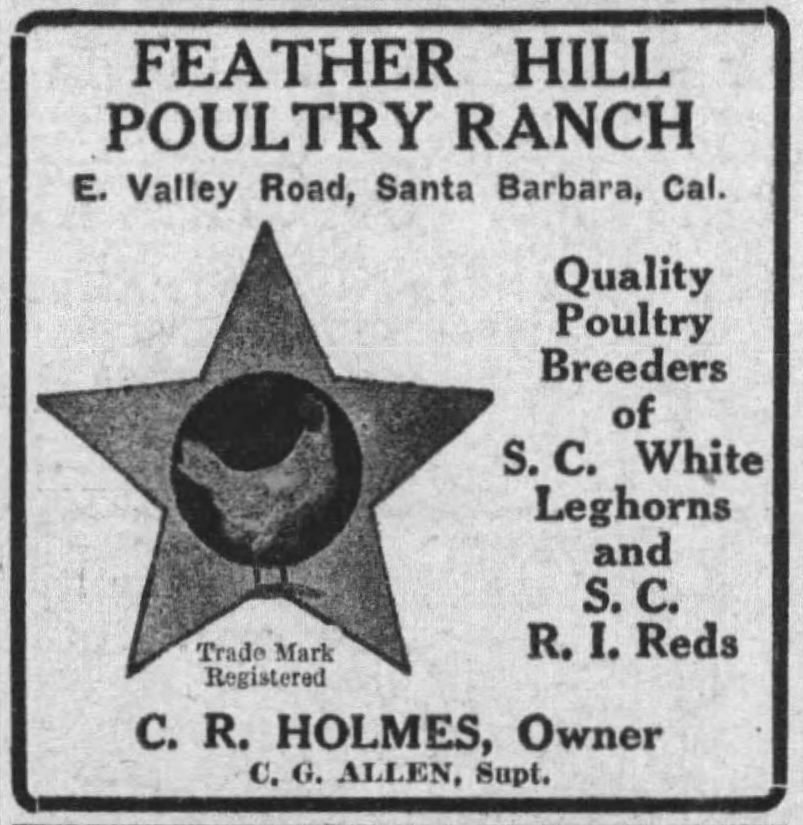
- Feather Hill Poultry Ranch, Santa Barbara, California (Los Angeles Times, 1925)
- Interactive map of Feather Hill Ranch Zoo
- Date opened: 1924
- Date closed: 1930
- Location: East Valley Road, Montecito, California
- Owner: Christian R. Holmes Jr.

The Feather Hill Zoo or Feather Hill Ranch Zoo was a private animal collection in Montecito, California, owned by Christian R. Holmes Jr. from 1924 to 1930. Featherhill Ranch was located on East Valley Road "astride Romero Creek." Originally a poultry farm, the ranch rapidly established a large collection of birds and animals to attract customers.

== History ==
In April 1924, Christian R. Holmes Jr. began buying the parcels that became the Feather Hill Ranch as part of a plan to make money raising chickens. The display collection began with exotic birds shown at the Ventura County Fair in fall 1924. In 1925 the 62-acre (0.097 mi^{2}; 0.25 km^{2}; 25 ha) ranch had 12,000 free-range White Leghorns, kept Rhode Island Reds and Light Brahmas for sale as capons, and offered holiday turkeys. The ranch also had Japanese silkie bantam chickens, Buff Cochin bantams, White King pigeons, "several varieties of pheasants, twelve varieties of doves, and several hundred finches, canaries, and other small birds," and ostriches.

The zoo was open to the public on weekends (when families could visit and also stock up on chicken for the week's meals) and every weekday except Monday. The animal collection included foxes, ringtail cats, monkeys, a mountain lion, an orangutan, a pair of leopards, hyenas, bobcats, raccoons, a black panther, a spotted panther, camels, springboks, alligators, snakes, a Gila monster, a kangaroo, a wallaby, coatis, fennec foxes, two cheetahs, "four huge lions," assorted bears (sun, cinnamon, black), an elephant, and chimpanzees named Pansy and Violet. Pansy was human-acculturated and would go to dinners and travel around town by motor car. The orangutan was a large male called Sultan.

In 1926 a newspaper reported that an elephant named Culver had been purchased from a circus because Holmes' son had requested an elephant; the elephant came as matched set with a pony named Bunny. In 1928 the zoo acquired 28 mule deer from Kaibab National Forest. Later the same year the Feather Hill Zoo bought three Bengal tigers and a sacred Indian baboon from Al G. Barnes Circus. In December 1928, the blackbuck and axis deer both had new fawns. According to one account the Leo the original MGM lion retired to Feather Hill. The carnivores at the zoo were fed surplus chicken from the poultry operation. The zoo also had a large number of Great Danes, mastiffs, and "various kinds of dogs" that were offered for sale and/or "used to help in the recapture of escaped animals."

Holmes built an artificial lake that was frequented by wildfowl and migratory birds. Circa 1929 the bird collection included bald eagles, golden eagles, flamingos, an Australian galah parrot, macaws, budgies, lovebirds, Goura pigeons, doves, turkey vultures, ravens, crows, magpies, a pair of brolgas, a white peacock, an African secretary bird, and a cassowary.

In 1930, Holmes offered the collection to the city of Santa Barbara but they declined, so the animals were purchased by Herbert Fleishhacker and moved to the San Francisco Zoo. William Randolph Hearst had also been interested in purchasing the collection for Hearst Castle. After selling off the Feather Hill animal collection, Holmes moved to Hawaii where he established another private zoo on his private island.

== See also ==
- Catalina Bird Park
- Universal City Zoo
- Selig Zoo
