= Olga Celeste =

American animal trainer (1888–1969)

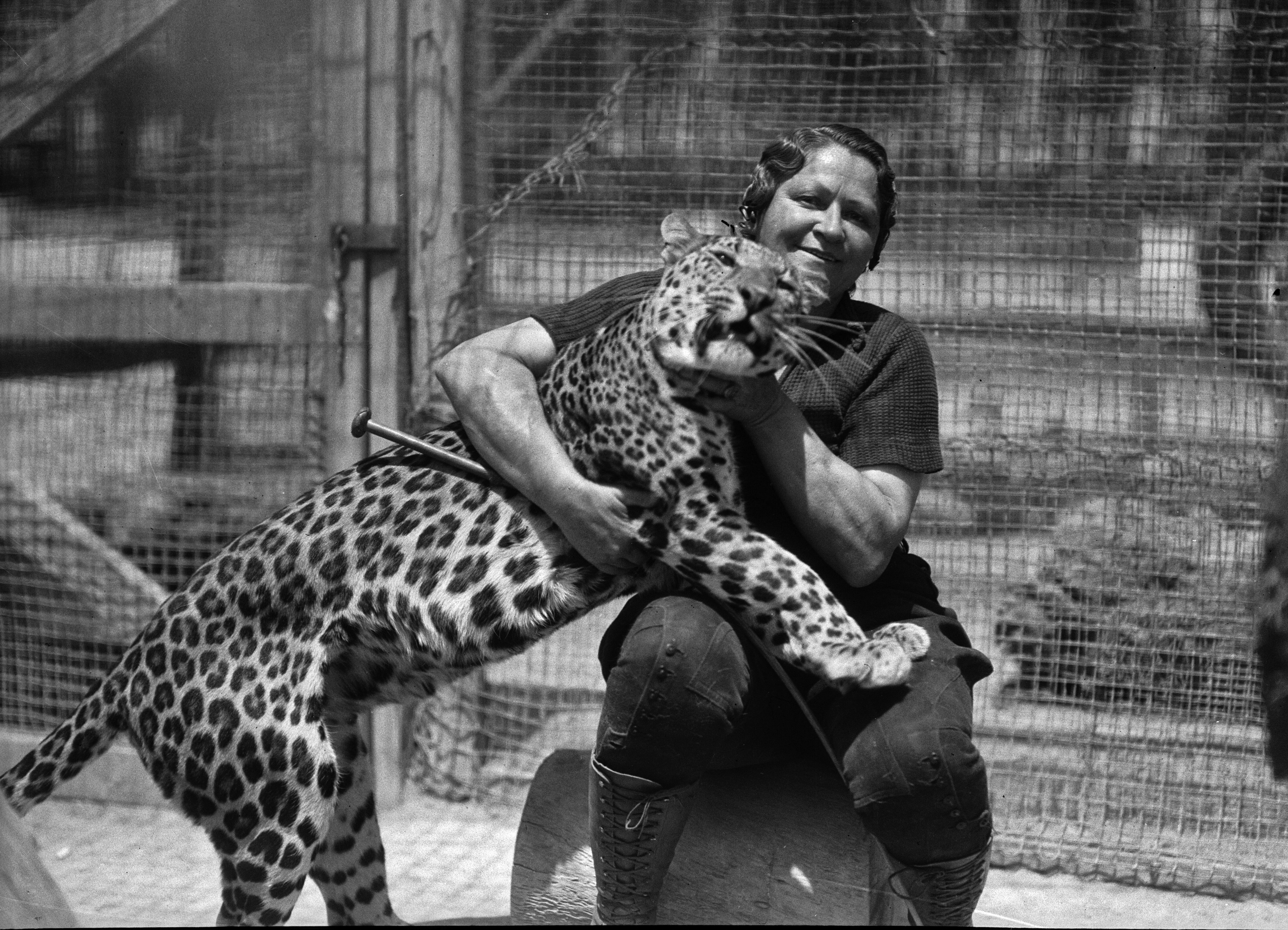
- Olga Celeste and Eckie the leopard, 1936
- Born: Olga Cecilia Knutson; April 9, 1888; Sweden
- Died: August 31, 1969 (aged 81); California
- Occupations: Animal trainer, actress

Olga Celeste (April 9, 1888 – August 31, 1969) trained leopards and pumas for performance in circuses, vaudeville and film. She starred in very early animal films for Selig Polyscope, and was said (perhaps hyperbolically) to have handled animals for 1,000 films, including Nissa the leopard in the Katharine Hepburn film Bringing Up Baby. For most of her career she was associated with the Selig Zoo in Los Angeles.

== Early life ==
Olga Celeste was born in Sweden; her father was a horse trainer. According to the Los Angeles Times she ran away at 11 to join a Swedish circus, but eventually returned home. Another report said that she ran away to train horses and after several days her parents found her living in a barn and sleeping in a manger. She reportedly told an interviewer that "her father sold her horse to the Circus Madigan; right then, she wanted 'to run away from home, join the circus and be with her horse'."

Per a 2020 Swedish-language profile of Olga Celeste, "As a 16-year-old, she had left her parents' home outside Lund in Skåne, at night, to take the Amerikabåt and make her dreams come true. Olga was the youngest of seven siblings and the only naughty one. Her older sisters and brothers were all well-behaved and disappeared through life and into their coffins without anyone taking much notice of them." One 16-year-old Olga Cecelia Knutson of Lund, Skåne Län departed Malmö for Chicago on April 15, 1904. She took the ship SS Cretic from Liverpool to Boston, arriving April 30; her contact in the U.S. was her sister Edith Knutson of Chicago. (Note: Twenty years later, when boarding a ship for Hawaii, Olga Celeste Knutson stated that she had been naturalized a citizen at the Cook County Courthouse on April 15, 1904, suggesting that her claim of being a legally naturalized citizen was fabulism.) According to Frank Buck, Princess Celeste ran away at age 14 or 15 to join a circus operating in Chicago's Riverview Park. (Note: Big Otto operated in Riverview Park.) The Riverview Park bit may be roughly correct; somewhere along the way she apparently encountered Essie Fay, a "famous equestrian who worked with sixty-three horses in an act for the Walter L. Main Circus," and was inspired to follow her dreams into circus life.

== Early career ==
Her start in show business supposedly came in 1904 when she lived with her older sister in Chicago. She was hired by Big Otto Breitkreutz and was taught how to run a dog and pony show. According to other accounts she was game to work with horses when the regular trainer was injured and that launched her career. A third account has it that Essie Fay mentored her and that she "learned to present several combination animal acts: elephant and pony; wolf and collie; a baby bear with two dogs; two blue Dane dogs with lions and bears; and lions, pumas, and leopards."

Big Otto's operation was acquired by film producer William Selig and she continued on as a "lion tamer" for that outfit. Around 1908, she appeared opposite Charles B. Murphy in a 500 ft (150 m) motion picture short called The Lion's Bride. It was reportedly premiered in Riverview Park and caused a sensation. Murphy and Olga Celeste were married around 1910 but later divorced; the couple had no children. She was occasionally credited as Olga Celeste Murphy during the teens. (Note: Murphy was also an animal trainer, actor and stuntman; he served as the head of the Universal City Zoo in the late 1920s and was killed in a production accident in 1942.) Olga Celeste also starred in Selig's 1909 The Leopard Queen (directed by Francis Boggs), and worked as a stunt double for Kathlyn Williams in Selig's groundbreaking serial The Adventures of Kathlyn.

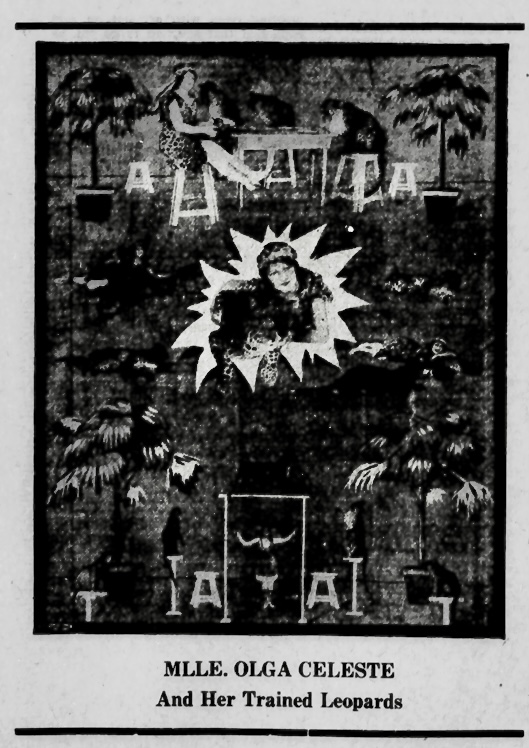
Mlle. Olga Celeste and Her Trained Leopards to appear at the Jefferson County Fair in Fairfield, Iowa, August 12–13, 1920

Employed by the Luna Park Zoo in Los Angeles, Celeste worked with and trained a handful of leopards and hosted leopard tea parties on Sundays. Apparently Olga Celeste "called her leopards her babies and adored them precisely because, as she said, they were 'the most treacherous' of animals. Frequently dressed to resemble her leopards, Olga serves as an access point to another world if only because her animals have turned her into something 'other' even outside the realm of fiction." In 1923 Mlle. Celeste took her leopard act to Aloha Park in Hawaii. She also did stints with John Robinson Circus, Al G. Barnes Circus and Ringling Brothers.

In the time of the 1930 census, Olga Celeste was living in a rental near Lincoln Park, Los Angeles. She reported her age at first marriage as 14. She reported that she had first come to the United States in 1907 and was now a naturalized citizen. Following the success of a hit 1933 Clyde Beatty picture, she was hired to appear as one of the trainers in Taming the Jungle.

== Nissa the Leopard ==
When director Howard Hawks could not find a panther that would work for the 1938 film, Bringing Up Baby, Baby was changed to a leopard so they could cast the trained leopard Nissa, who had worked in the industry for eight years, making several B-movies.

Both the leopards in the story were played by Nissa, supervised by Celeste, who stood by with a whip during shooting. Celeste worked with and trained several leopards but her favorite was Nissa, whom she considered nothing more than a large house cat. Because Nissa was such a joy to have around, Celeste often took her home with her after a long day on the set.

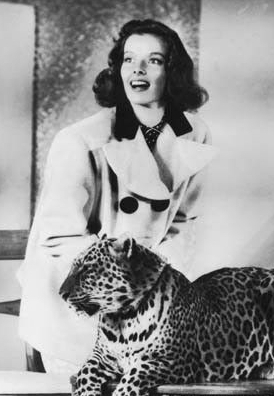
Katharine Hepburn and Nissa in a publicity photo; at one point, Nissa lunged at Hepburn but was stopped by the trainer's whip.

Sweet and docile for the most part, Nissa did have a precocious side. As a lover of perfume Nissa was soothed, comforted and drawn to anything that smelled fragrant, so Olga used perfume as her main training technique. The very first scene shot for the movie featured Hepburn walking around her bedroom and talking on the phone wearing a gorgeous floating dressing gown. Perfume was sprinkled on the cloth near Hepburn’s knee so that Nissa in the scene would rub up against Hepburn’s leg in affectionate greeting.

Hepburn was generally unafraid of Nissa until one scene, when Hepburn spun around and caused her skirt to twirl, Nissa lunged at her and had to be subdued by Celeste cracking her whip. Grant, however, was terrified; most scenes of the two interacting are done in close-up with a stand-in. Hepburn played upon his fear by throwing a toy leopard through the roof of Grant's dressing room during production.There were several news reports about Hawks's difficulty filming the live leopard, and the potential danger to highly valuable actors, so some scenes required rear-screen projection.

== Later career and death ==
When the Luna Park Zoo shut down in 1940 she was the last original employee of what had once been Selig's Wild Animal Farm, and she borrowed money (including, reportedly, from friends like boxer Jack Dempsey and Tarzan actor Johnny Weissmuller) to buy five leopards and three lions that she did not want sold to strangers. The last of these cats died in 1954. After she retired, Olga Celeste lived out her days in Burbank. She died in 1969 and was buried on September 8 in the same grave as life partner Emma Bell Clifford at Evergreen Park Memorial Cemetery. She was survived by nieces and nephews in the American Midwest and Sweden. Olga Celeste rarely, if ever, used her legal last name Knutson. She went by a number of stage names including Princess Olga, Princess Celeste, Princess Cecilia, Madame Olga, Mademoiselle Celeste, et al. She was also known as the Leopard Lady.

== See also ==
- Irina Bugrimova, Soviet lion tamer
- Mabel Stark, American tiger trainer
- Ephraim Thompson, American elephant trainer

== Sources ==
- Adams, Katherine H.; Keene, Michael L. (2012). Women of the American Circus, 1880–1940 (ebook ed.). Jefferson, North Carolina: McFarland. ISBN 978-0-7864-7228-4. OCLC 796760279.
