= Christian R. Holmes Jr. =

American soldier, businessman (1896–1944)

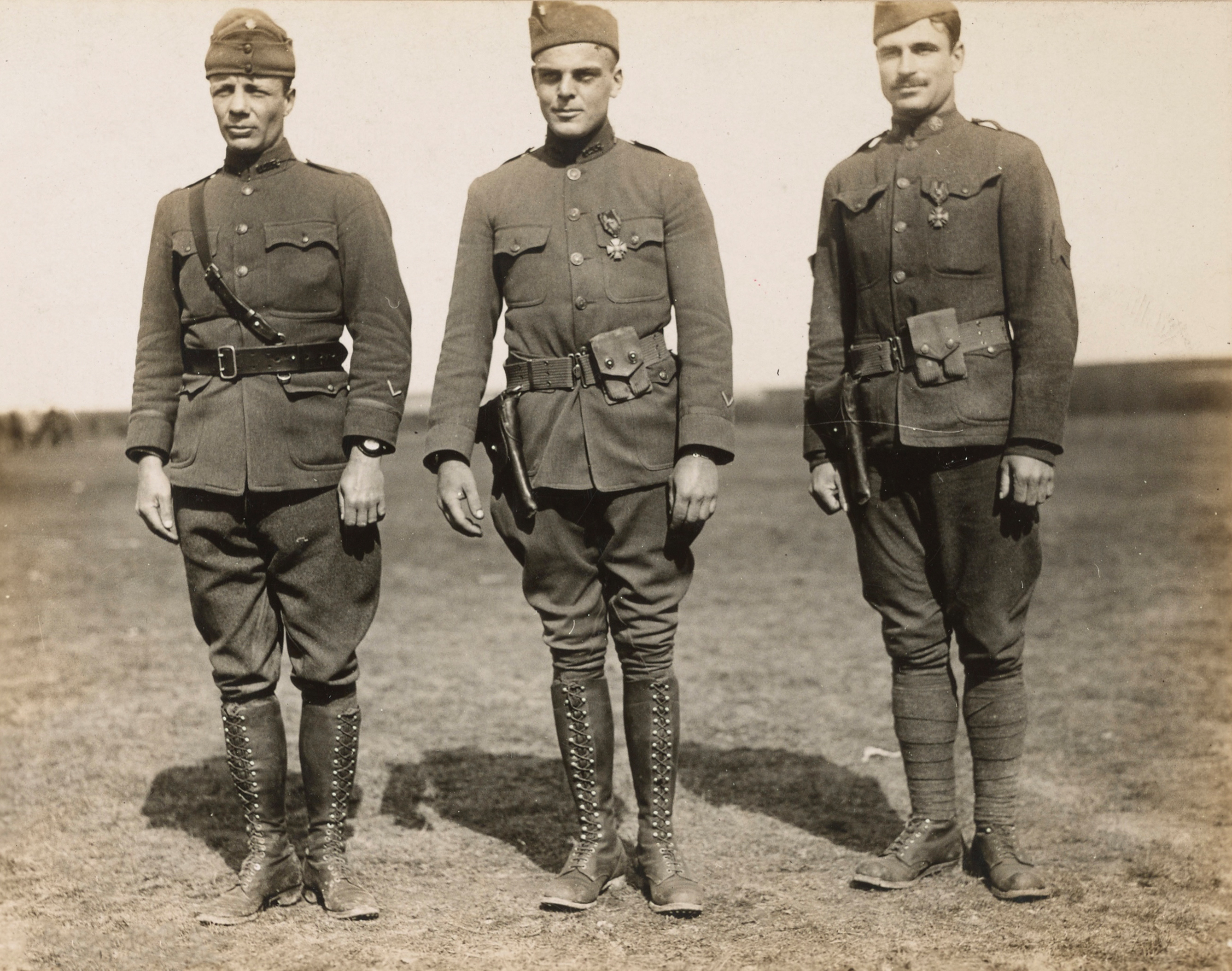
- Holmes (center) with Theodore Roosevelt Jr. and James A. Murphy attending military award ceremonies in Bois l'Eveque, France.
- Born: June 13, 1898
- Died: February 5, 1944 (aged 45)
- Relatives: Elizabeth Holmes (great-granddaughter)
- Awards: Distinguished Service Cross

Christian Rasmus Holmes Jr. (June 13, 1898 – February 5, 1944) was an American millionaire heir, investor and sportsman. He established the Feather Hill Zoo in California and owned and redeveloped Coconut Island, off the coast of Oahu in Hawaii. He was awarded the Distinguished Service Cross for action during World War I.

== Early life ==
Christian Rasmus Holmes Jr. was born in Cincinnati, Ohio. His father was Christian R. Holmes Sr., an otolaryngologist and ophthalmologist "and builder of hospitals," who played an important role in the establishment of the Cincinnati General Hospital. His mother was Betty Fleischmann, a philanthropist thought to have given away $20 million during her lifetime. She was a part of the family that manufactured Fleischmann's yeast and collected Asian art.

== Career ==
His draft card in 1917 states that he was employed by the U.S. government at Fort Harrison, Indiana (which at that point had been abandoned for 100 years) and his occupation was "candidate for U.S.R." He served as a first lieutenant in the U.S. Army during World War I and was awarded the Distinguished Service Cross for having "cut and crawled through 12 strands of wire in front of an enemy listening post, leaped upon the sentinel, made him a prisoner, and brought him back through 'No Man's Land.'" He served under Theodore Roosevelt Jr.; the French government "twice awarded him the Croix du Guerre"; he was wounded three times; and he was gassed three times. He completed his military service at the rank of captain. According to one account, "despite his fearless reputation" his war service "cost him his mental health. He drank in excess [and] frittered much of his fortune away on wild extravagances."

Originally employed as an investment broker in New York, Holmes moved to California for the lifestyle "you can only get in the country." His uncle Max C. Fleischmann already lived in the Santa Barbara area and was a major benefactor of athletic and cultural facilities in the area. Feather Hill Ranch started out as a poultry farming operation and rapidly expanded into a large and eclectic collection of exotic birds and wild animals known as Feather Hill Zoo. After Holmes sold the Montecito, California bird and animal collection to the San Francisco Zoo, he moved to Hawaii. In 1935 he "acquired control of the Hawaiian Tuna Packers" (later Coral Tuna), took possession of a Waikiki estate, and bought Coconut Island. He is credited with redeveloping Coconut Island from being a mere "guava and lantana inlet" (strawberry guava and lantana being two introduced plants that have naturalized on the Hawaiian Islands). He expanded the island from 12 to 28 acres using earth from "main sandbar in Kāne'ohe Bay (near Kāpapa Island)," created fish ponds, and imported exotic plants for the gardens. He was known to collect orchids. He created another private zoo in Hawaii, which included "donkeys, a giraffe, monkeys, and a baby elephant." Barbara Hutton was a guest at his Waikiki estate in 1940. The island was handed over to the control of the U.S. military at the beginning of World War II.

== Death and legacy ==
Holmes died of an intentional overdose of sleeping pills ("barbiturates poisoning") in 1944, at the Savoy-Plaza Hotel in Manhattan, New York. After his death, his Hawaiian animal collection was transferred to the Honolulu Zoo.

== Family ==
Holmes' grandson Christian R. Holmes IV was also awarded for valor by the U.S. Army, wrote the foreword to a history of the Fleischmann family, and is the father of Elizabeth Holmes, fraud-convicted founder of failed Theranos.
