= Universal City Zoo =

Animal collection in California (1913–1930)

Coordinates: 34.1410°N 118.3484°W

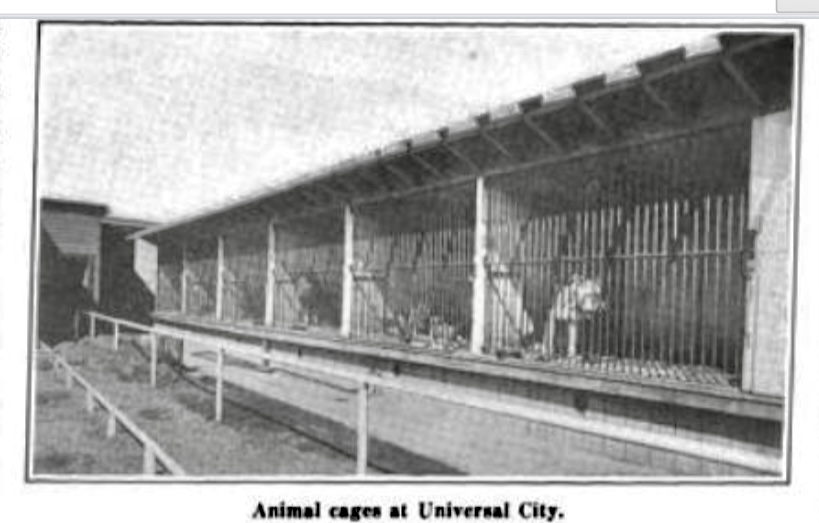
- "Animal cages at Universal City" (Scientific American, 1915)
- Interactive map of Universal City Zoo
- Date opened: about 1913
- Date closed: about 1930
- Location: Universal City, California

Universal City Zoo was a private animal collection in southern California that provided animals for silent-era Universal Pictures adventure films, circus pictures, and animal comedies, and to "serve as a point of interest" for tourists visiting Universal City. The animals were also leased to other studios. The zoo was closed in 1930, after cinema's transition to synchronized sound complicated the existing systems for using trained animals onscreen.

== History ==
The Universal zoo was one of the earliest parts of the film operation that Carl Laemmle sent out to the west coast, and one of the first pieces developed within the Universal City he opened in 1915. According to one scholar, avoiding the oversight of east-coast animal welfare groups was one of the many motives for moving the film industry out west. The so-called Universal Oak Crest ranch zoo located at the old Providencia Ranch began with what would today be called a petting zoo of domestic animals (goats, sheep, a pig and horses) and rapidly expanded to include a menagerie of wild animals, supposedly including "lions, tigers, bears, pumas, leopards, jaguars and other wild denizens of the tropical forests." In May 1914, two lionesses and leopard got in a half-hour-long fight when a chute was left open between cages; one of the lionesses was severely injured. In July 1914, shaving the camels for "sanitary reasons" yielded camel hair that was sold for $350. As Carol Weld put it in 1939, “Among the oak trees, desert scenes, and other natural beauties to be found on the far outskirts of Los Angeles was established a good-sized zoo."

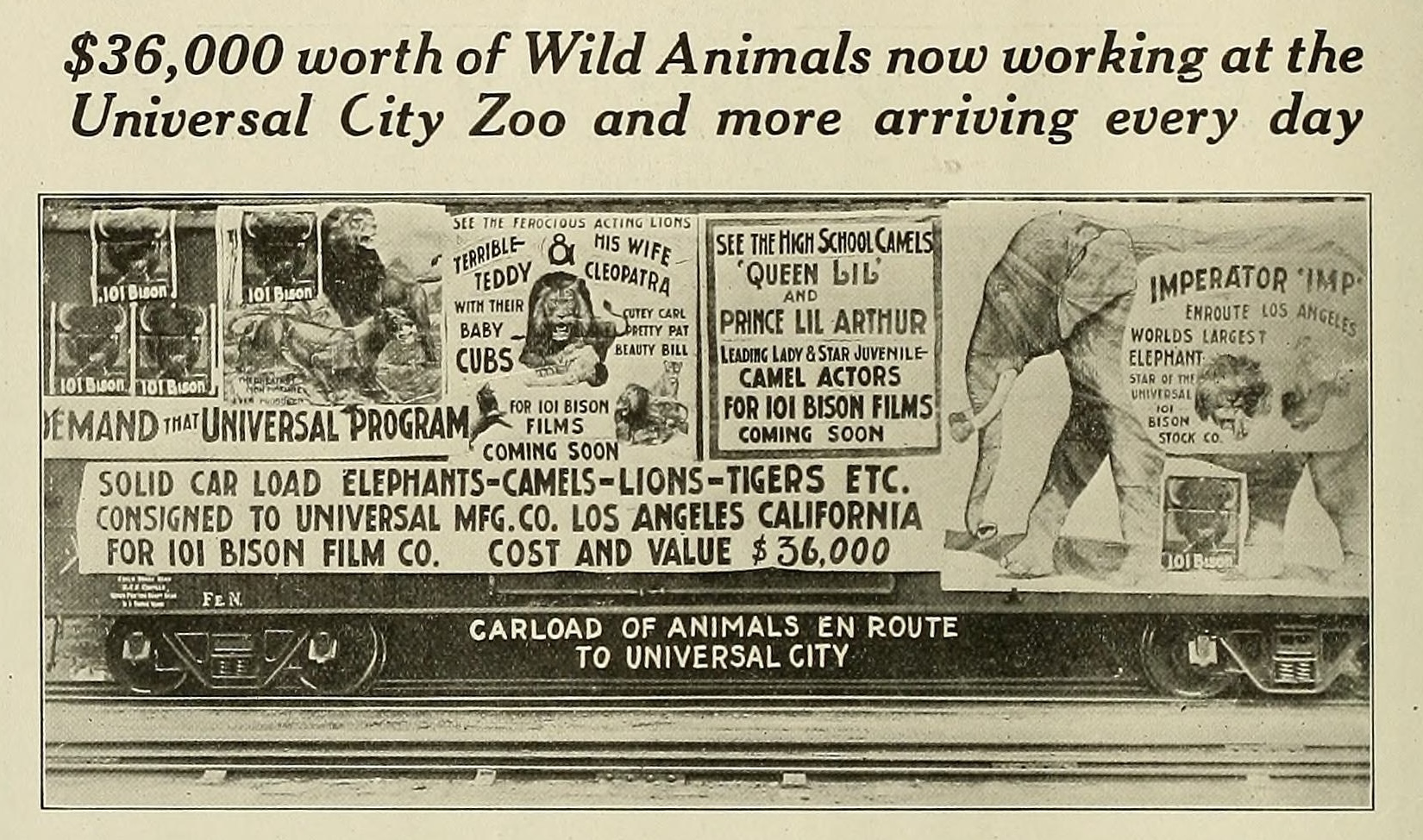
Universal City animal shipment 1913; note logos for IMP (Independent Moving Pictures, Carl Laemmle's first operation) and 101 Bison.

When Universal City held its grand opening at the current location (at what was then called Lankershim) on March 15, 1915, the dedicated zoo and arena for filming were a major attraction for the thousands of invited guests. Admission to the studio tour, including the zoo, cost 25¢ in 1915. The tour included a box lunch and attracted an average of 500 visitors a day. Visiting dignitaries, such as Henry Ford or the chairman of the Canadian Censor Board, were frequently given tours and photo opportunities with the famous animals. Universal City in 1915 also reportedly had a stable with 500 horses, along with a studio blacksmith and saddlery. The 400-acre (1.6 km^{2}) studio was wild even without the addition of African lions and leopards—"jackrabbits and mountain lions still roamed it." In 1916, someone brought a black diamond rattlesnake to the zoo; De Rosselli supposedly "performed the operation of removing the poison sack from its mouth and now it is destined to be an actor." During a zoo baby boom in 1917, an entertainment writer made a reference that pointed to the fraught social politics of the nadir of American race relations era: "There is no race suicide evidence about Universal City Zoo. The troop of youngsters there include a leopard, three lions, four huskies, seven wolves, camel, cinnamon bear, and three goats, all under four weeks of age."

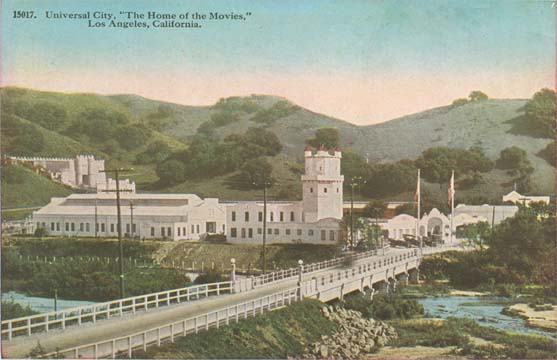
Universal City and the Los Angeles River, undated postcard

Circa summer 1919, the index of animals on the back ranch was "one tigress, 4 lionesses, 7 lions, 4 lion cubs, 6 leopards, 2 leopard cubs, 2 pumas, 2 bears, 10 wolves, 3 newborn wolf-puppies, 12 Malamute sledge dogs, 3 weaning puppies, 1 elephant, 4 camels, 1 baby camel, 4 monkeys, 1 orangutan (the world-famous Joe Martin), 1 hoot-owl, 1 cockatoo, 2 ducks, 40 pigeons, 24 chickens, 16 domestic dogs." At the zoo's peak in 1920, it was home to some 30 lions. The zoo also periodically housed somewhat less familiar animals such as armadillos and anteaters. Harry Carey found two bear cubs on his ranch that year and took them to Curly Stecker, "knowing that they would be well-cared for at Universal City." In 1921, the zoo bought eight kangaroos.

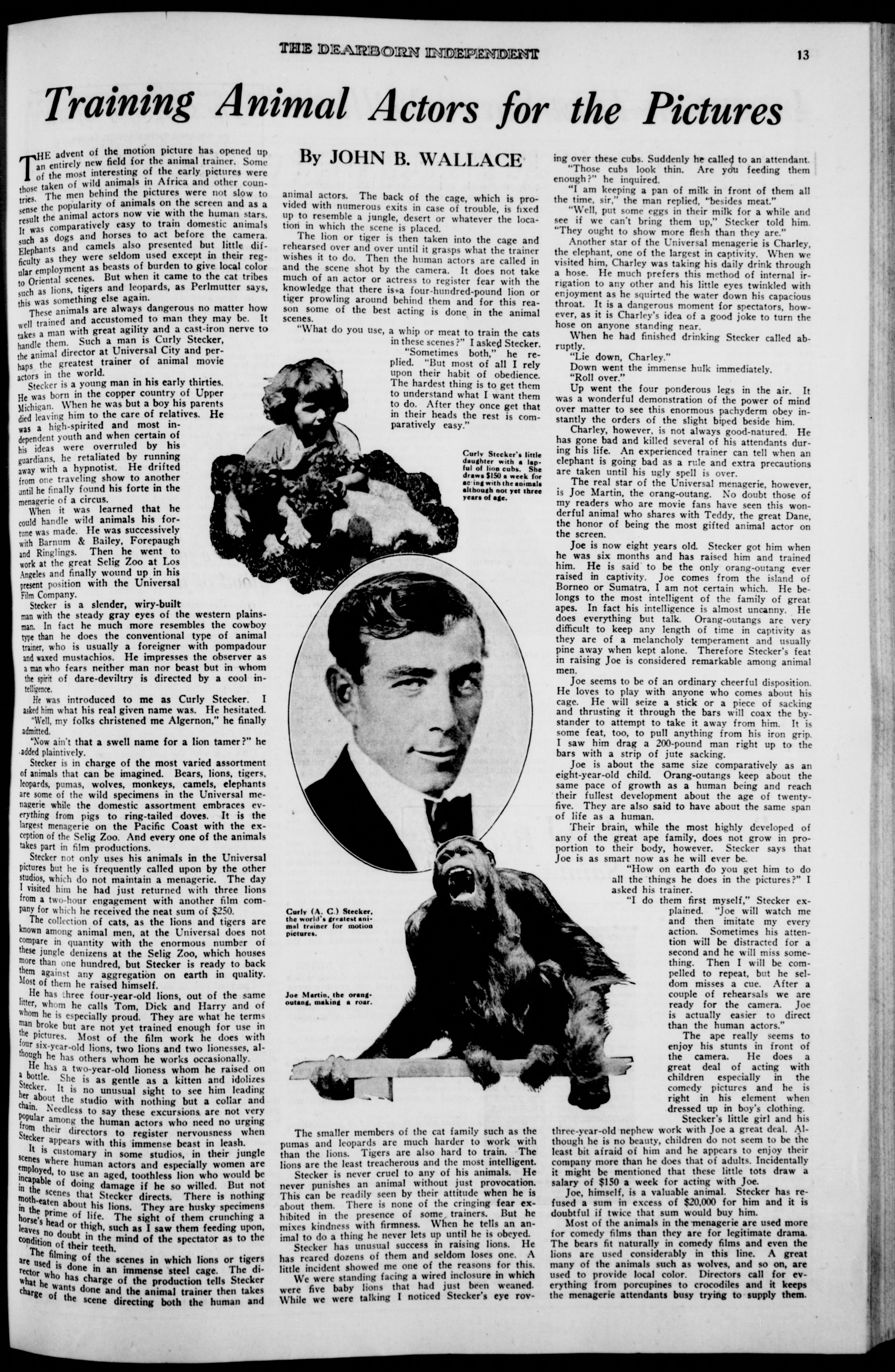
"Training Animal Actors for the Pictures" featuring Curley Stecker, his daughter (with lion cubs), and Joe Martin (1920)

Circa 1921, a newspaper reporter wrote that the zoo was on the Universal back ranch about 2 mi (3.2 km) down a winding road from Universal City. She described it as "surrounded by a tall whitewashed fence with everything looking about neat as a pin…laid out with white walks, a large wire-enclosed bird house being the centerpiece of the place, [which contains] everything from canary-birds to a huge elephant." The zoo also had a "big barn-like building with concrete floors" that housed an elephant and six camels. The cages were said to be within 100 ft (30 m) of the Los Angeles River, a location that put the zoo in danger of intermittent flooding. In 1921, Betsy, one of apparently multiple mountain lions at the zoo, gave birth to a litter of four kittens. Carl Laemmle's brothers-in-law Julius and Abe Stern had a film operation across town that produced comedy shorts. Sometimes their animals, such as the so-called Century Lions, were boarded at the zoo. In April 1921, all of the Century Comedy Zoo (aka L-KO) animals were moved to the Universal Zoo. In the mid-1920s, Carl Laemmle personally managed the studio's response to animal cruelty allegations by the American Animal Defense League in the wake of the killing of Charlie the Elephant. In 1926, the zoo auctioned off a number of animals, including 10 lions, two tigers, six monkeys and some "less interesting" animals to local zoos, circuses and private owners. (The lions auctioned in 1926 may have become the core of the Goebel's Lion Farm collection in Thousand Oaks, California.)

The zoo closed in 1930. One article in 1939 stated, "When the talkies came…the menagerie proved too expensive to keep up…it represented an investment of $600,000." Sometime before May 1930, the 26 lions were sold to a circus in Macon, Georgia, Brownie the bear was sent to Kansas City, and Jiggs the orangutan went to a zoo in San Diego. According to one source the end of the silent era doomed the zoo because it was no longer possible for a trainer to stand behind the camera and verbally cue the animals through their moves. Using hand signals, that the animal needed to perceive from 30 ft (9.1 m) away was "so arduous a task that until now wild animals have not been used in talkies, save in one or two synchronized sequences."

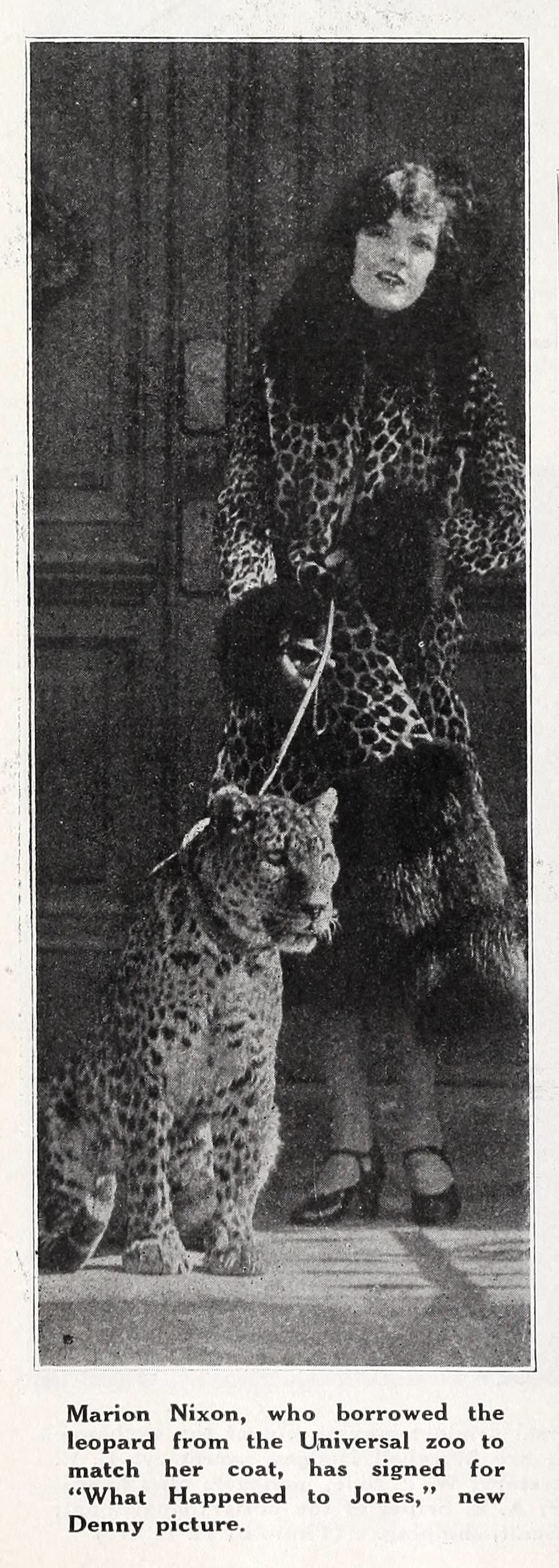
Marian Nixon and leopard (Exhibitors Herald, 1925)

The studio may have held onto a handful of low-maintenance animals and/or kept the zoo infrastructure intact into the early 1930s. The studio stopped offering tours in the 1930s and would not revive the practice until 1964.

=== Shooting incidents ===
Universal City Zoo assistant keeper Jose Alvarez was involved in what was described as a "revolver duel" in 1917; Alvarez was dying and the other man, Modesto Sylvas, was dead after an alleged attack by Sylvas on Alvarez's wife.

In February 1927, one assistant trainer at the zoo, Scotty Wonderle, shot another assistant trainer, George Emerson, as part of some long-standing personal feud. The proximate issue was whose job it was to put a mat in a tiger’s cage. Emerson survived and worked as a film-industry animal trainer for another 20 years.

=== Animal-care practices ===
During the Curley Stecker era, feeding time was 8 a.m. daily except Sundays. (Sunday was a fast day; on Monday mornings the first meal of the day was rich fare.) The camels were each given half a bale of hay a day. The lions got 25 lb (11 kg) of meat a day, while the leopards and pumas got 12 lb (5.4 kg) each. Bears received bread and vegetables, and had 5 ft (1.5 m)-deep pits filled with running water. "Eskimo dogs" were served bread, vegetables and a meat stew. Animals were given water three times a day in winter, and running water was put in all cages during the summer.

== Head trainers ==
The zoo supervisors and head trainers were often involved in conceiving and producing the studio's animal pictures. Most had a circus background. Paul Bourgeois both directed animal films and worked as an actor. The brothers Stecker and Charles B. Murphy worked together managing the animals on the Zane Grey film Golden Dreams. De Rosselli, Stecker and Murphy all had on-screen parts in the lion-tamer romance The Man Tamer (1921) starring Gladys Walton.

Years active at zoo	Name	Alternate names	Other info
July 1913? – January 1914?	Pop Saunders	Sanders, Henry	Previously associated with the Sells Floto Circus and the 101 Ranch Show. By 1916 he was in McAllen, Texas, working as a "monkey driller" who "occasionally tops a bronk." He may have ended up at the Selig Zoo. An aside in a trade paper column from February 1914 uses the phrase "Pop Saunders, the man who apotheosized sequitude" as a comparison to something slow and late to catch up.
January 1914? – April 14, 1914	Doc Kirby	Kirby, Dr. William Warner, or Dr. W. W. Kirby, or Captain Kirby	"He was a member of the Paul Rainey expedition to Africa and had assisted in the capture of wild beasts as well as being an expert in training them. He had had years of experience as a circus man." Died from blood poisoning after being mauled by lion while filming the Lucille Love serial. At the time of his death he was engaged to be married to Lorena Lorenz, "the Girl in Red," who had a specialty of diving with a horse into a water tank. The lion was shot. A coroner's jury found that the cause of death was "poor medical treatment."
May 1914–1915?	Jerry M. Barnes	Stonehouse, Jeremiah Montross Barnes	Barnes was an old circus hand. His wife ran dancing bears. He had 25 years of animal training experience, including with his brother's Al. G. Barnes Circus. Bitten by a "wolf-dog" in December 1914 while training it to jump through a flaming hoop.
1915? – 1916?	Paul Bourgeois	Sablon, Paul	Simultaneous with Rex De Rosselli? A tiger trainer and cinematographer from Europe, he had previously traveled with the Hagenbeck circus. See Paul Sablon for extended biography
1915 – 1917?	Rex De Rosselli		Simultaneous with Paul Bourgeois? When De Rosselli, also an actor, was cast in the lead of "a series of mountain pictures directed by George Cochrane," Curley Stecker was put in charge of the zoo. See Rex De Rosselli for extended biography
1913 – 1923	Curley Stecker	Stecker, Algernon Maltby	Previously with several American circuses and Selig Polyscope, Curley Stecker was the primary trainer of Joe Martin and Charlie the Elephant. Charlie was executed in 1923 for his near-fatal attack on Stecker. See Curley Stecker for extended biography
November 1921 – ?	Sigmund Moos		"Shakeup at U...Curley Stecker, for years custodian of the zoo, and chief animal trainer, is being replaced by Sigmund Moos." Moos had long been the studio's leasing manager; he had no evident animal expertise. Stecker was seemingly restored to his position in March 1922.
February 1922 – ?	Fritz Bruner		"Former Luna Park Zoo superintendent, has been placed in charge of the Universal Zoo, and is supervising the animal work for Stanley in Africa."
November 1923 – 1930	Charles B. Murphy	Murphy, Charles Bernard, lion-tamer stage name Carlo Bernardi or Carlos Bernado	Murphy had been a lion tamer since the St. Louis World's Fair in 1904. His ex-wife Mlle. Celeste was a leopard trainer at Luna Park Zoo. Herman Ziegler was named Murphy's assistant in 1925. Elected justice of the peace of Universal City in 1926 and performed at least one wedding. He appeared onscreen in many films, usually in bit parts or as a stuntman. Charles B. Murphy was killed in 1942 on the set of Lost Canyon when a wagon overturned.

== Notable animals ==
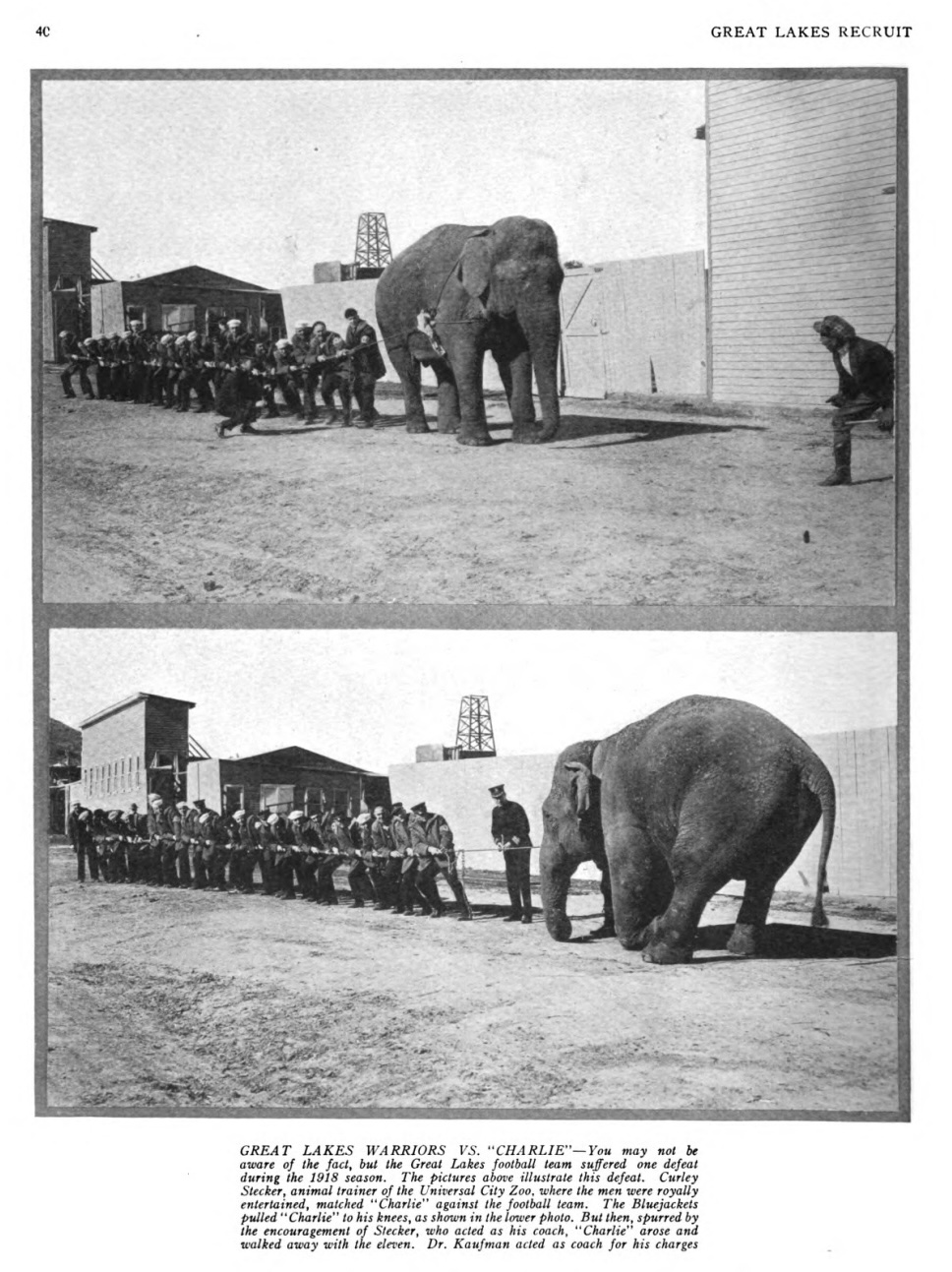
Charlie wins tug-of-war versus USMC recruits, 1917

=== Elephants ===
- Charlie (elephant) and Curley Stecker helped build Universal Studios way back in 1913. His attack on Curley Stecker made newspapers worldwide and his subsequent execution was a seminal event in reforming performing-animal welfare within the film industry
- Minnie (elephant) was brought to the zoo as a replacement for Charlie.

=== Big cats ===
- Princess (Bengal tiger) jumped ship from the schooner Vaquero off San Pedro during a film shoot in 1915, and "tiger on the loose!" was a big local event. Curley Stecker found her under some lumber on a dock, and lassoed her and returned her to containment. She was reportedly going to be killed onscreen in 1920 for the Jacques Jaccard movie Tiger! starring Frank Mayo. According to a later report, "she had gotten so temperamental that Universal officials decided she had best be shot before she killed someone," and doing it onscreen for the film would provide realism to the scene and be economically efficient as well. However, "Curly Stecker's kind heart" got the better of them and Princess was still working as of April 1921.

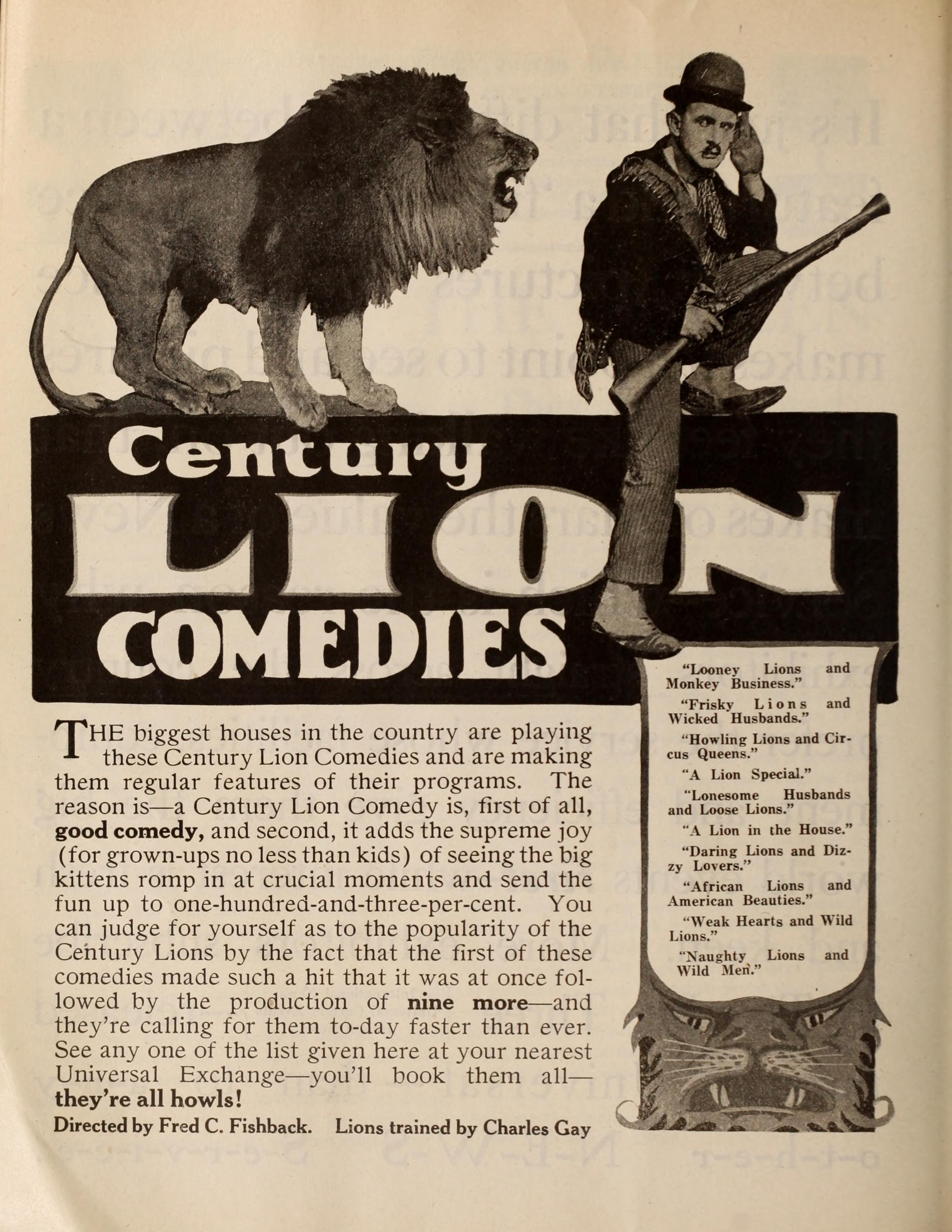
The Century Lions, trained by Charles Gay, appeared in comedies produced by the Stern brothers and distributed by Universal

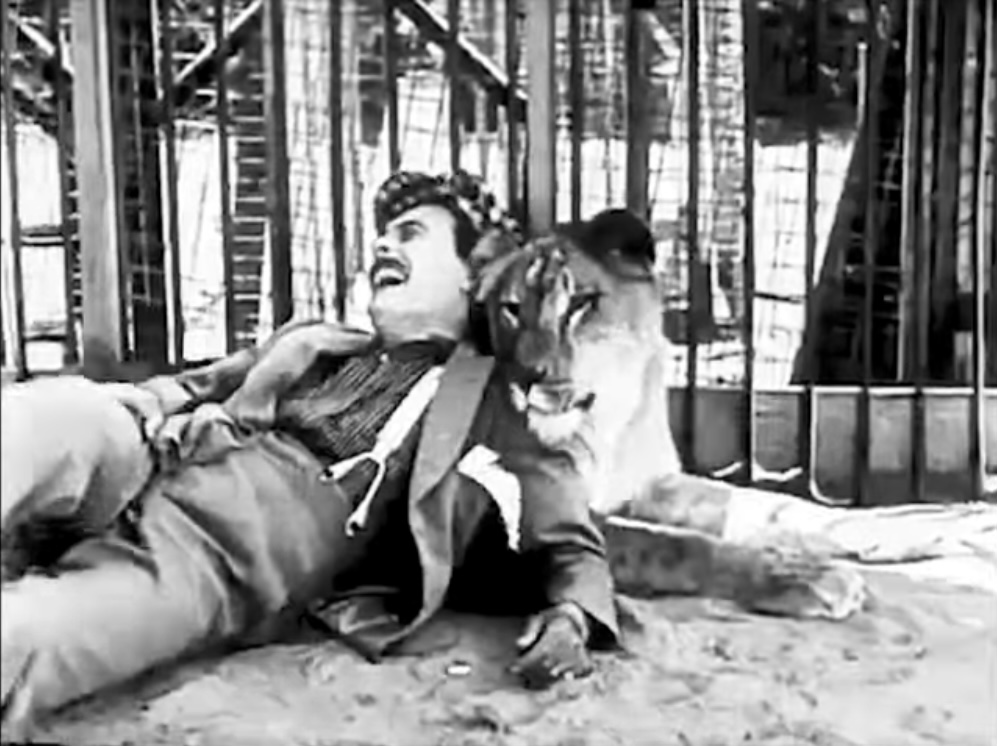
Max Linder with a Universal City Zoo lioness in Seven Years Bad Luck

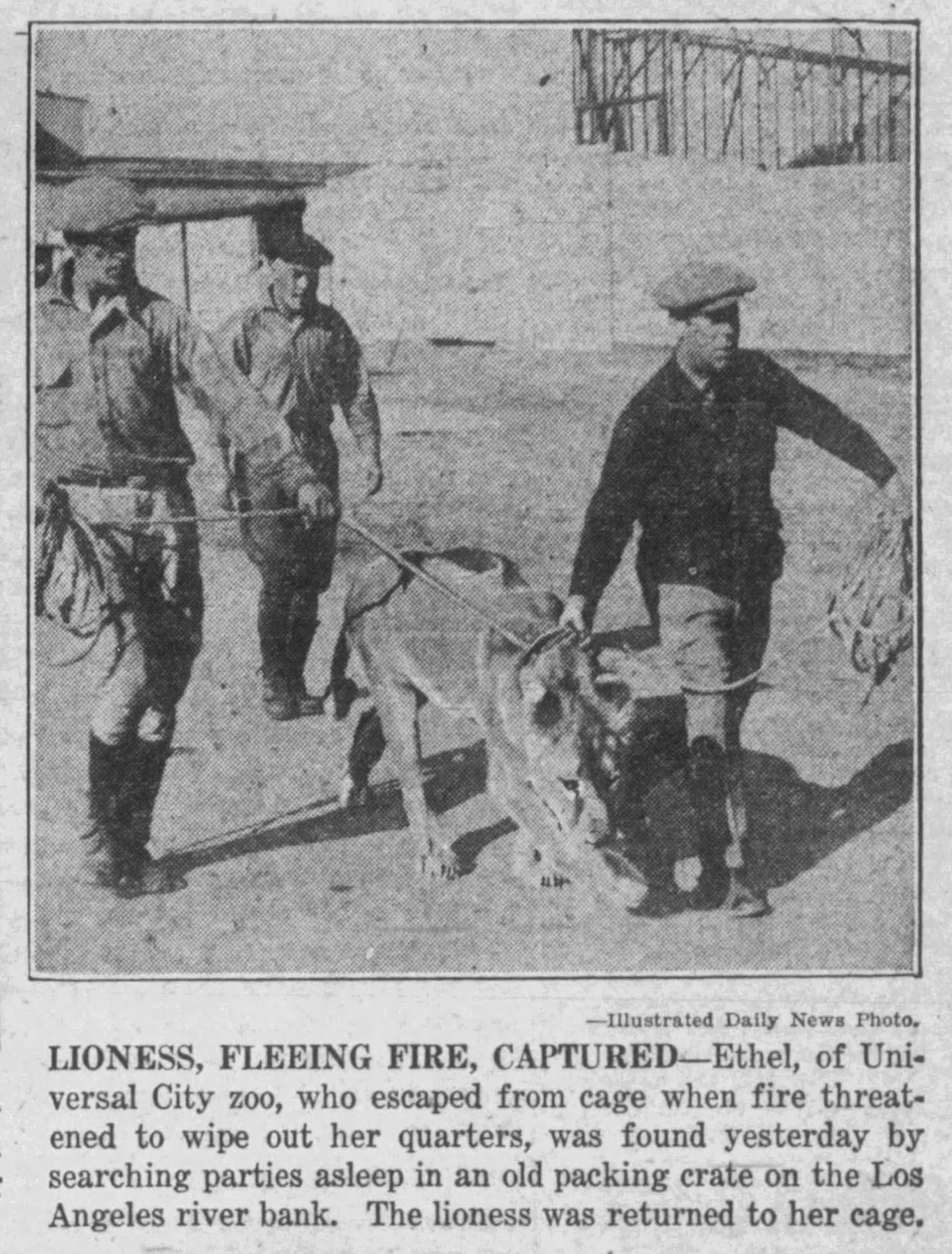
Ethel escapes Universal Studios fire, 1924

- The so-call Century Lions, stars of a comedy franchise produced by the Stern brothers, were temporarily housed at the Universal Zoo for insurance reasons until they moved permanently to Gay's Lion Farm.
- Ethel (lion) was born and raised at Universal. She attacked Curly Stecker in September 1922, mangling his left hand and removing flesh. Stecker was hospitalized at Universal City Hospital. There were likely multiple Ethels. An early Ethel died in 1918 and was buried in a ceremony that was attended by actress Marie Walcamp and director Harry Harvey, and included Charlie the elephant as pallbearer.
- Zela (lion cub) was taken home by Rudolph Valentino and Natacha Rambova at six weeks old. They kept as Zela as a pet until four months old when she was handed over to "Nell Shipman’s trainer" and taken to Oregon.

=== Primates ===
- Joe Martin (orangutan) had his own comedy franchise for a time, but became too dangerous for film work and was sold to a circus.
- Jiggs (orangutan) was meant to be a replacement for Joe Martin; Stecker had been planning to "retire" Joe Martin and replace him with a younger orangutan. Jiggs may have arrived at the zoo in 1921 in the company of two others, whom Stecker called Kelly and Moriarty. She injured her hand in 1926 trying to pull up boards from her cage. Jiggs was reportedly "sweet and even-tempered," and appeared in many Universal comedy shorts alongside human actors like Arthur Lake, Ben Corbett, and Pee Wee Holmes. Jiggs was relocated to a San Diego zoo when the Universal zoo closed in 1930. Universal's Jiggs was most likely the second Jiggs of the San Diego Zoo (the first being a male who arrived from Singapore as a baby and died young). The Zoo's second Jiggs was "an old and dangerous female, a movie actress accustomed to fighting for her rights." After a period in separate enclosures, the zoo staff moved her in with the younger female Maggie, and they lived together in reasonable harmony for five years. Author and zoo director Belle Benchley later wrote that Jiggs "brought Maggie up."
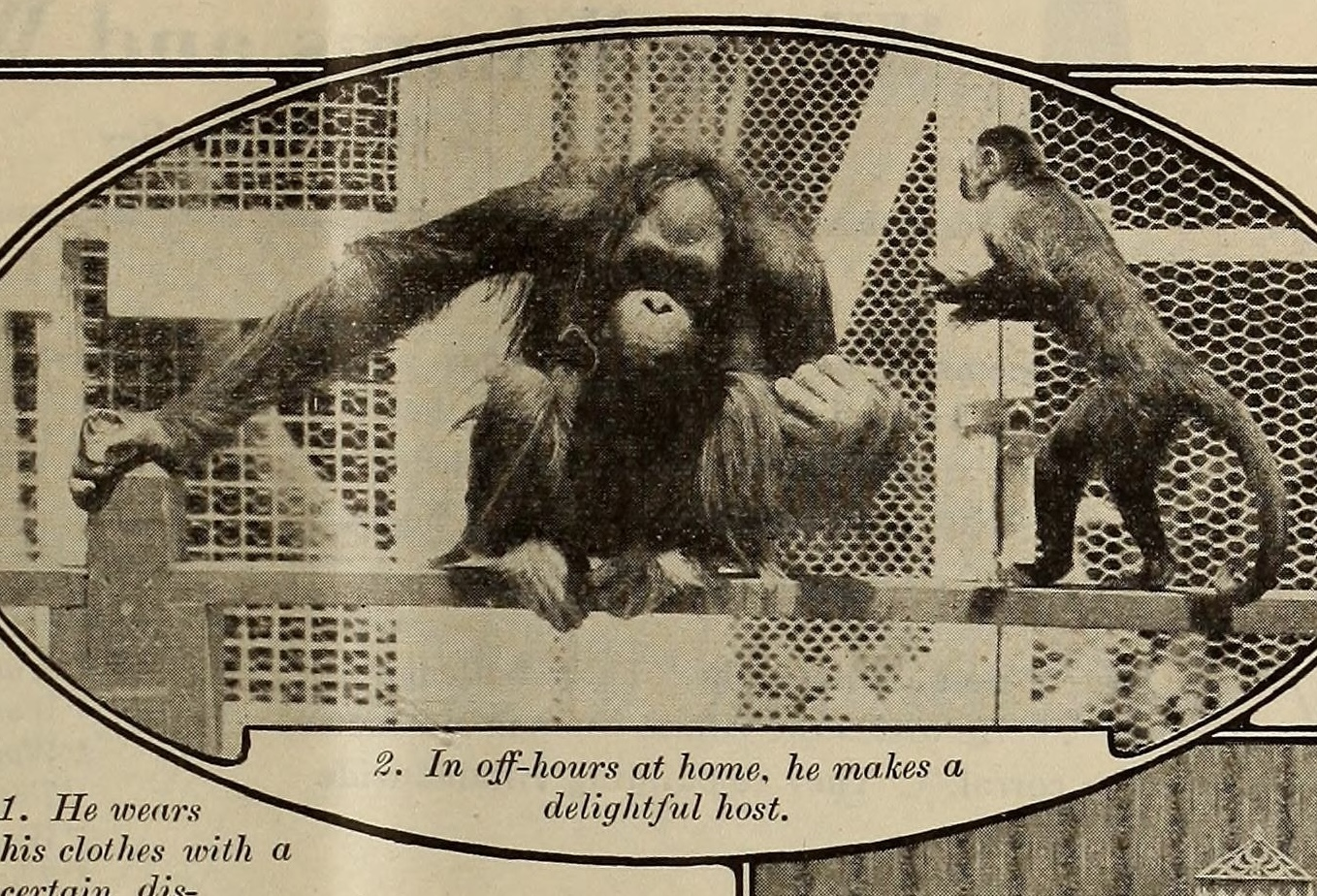
  Joe Martin and an unidentified capuchin monkey at Universal City Zoo (1919)
- Skipper (monkey), species unknown, often made his way into Joe Martin's enclosure, sometimes to the orangutan's annoyance. Described as "sassy," Skipper helped himself to Joe Martin's peanut allotment. According to a contemporary report,

In an animal comedy, called "Monkey Stuff," in which Joe took the lead, he had to smoke a cigar, and he got away with it, but was green-eyed for an hour afterward. When he went into his cage that night, he begged another lighted cigar from a studio carpenter, who gave it to him, observing that Joe had "got the habit." But Joe had something different from a habit—he had an idea. He puffed ecstatically for a moment, during which time Skipper chattered and cursed, seeing that Joe had something which he hadn't, and at last he snatched the lighted weed and started in on it. Those watching, say that Joe observed him with saturnine joy, and, by pretending to take the cigar away, bluffed Skipper into smoking all of it. What resulted was, of course, inevitable. The robber monkey curled up in a ball of misery and alternately suffered from mal de mere [sic] and attacks of cramps. Since then, he has not molested Joe's belongings, and peace reigns in the house of Martin.

=== Dogs ===
- Bob was a St. Bernard said to be the "Dean of the Universal City dogs." He appeared in Erich Von Stroheim's Blind Husbands.
- Jack Ketch was a Malamute named for English hangman Jack Ketch; he was assigned to guard Joe Martin's cage after the orangutan's summer 1919 escape from Universal. According to a contemporary report, "With teeth like a shark, weight to hold his own, and a battle record that shames the Malamute colony at Universal City, Jack Ketch is just the animal to make sure that Joe Martin does not escape again. If Joe could catch the animal he could tear him to pieces with his powerful hands, but the wily dog relies on his speed and sharp teeth."

=== Et al. ===
Little Joe (alligator) was apparently purchased from a bankrupt circus.

== Cary memoir ==
Diana Serra Cary was a child performer who appeared as "Baby Peggy" in dozens of short comedies produced by Century and distributed by Universal between 1921 and 1924. She mentioned Joe Martin, Charlie the Elephant, and Curley Stecker in her 1996 memoir, Whatever Happened to Baby Peggy? According to historian of silent-era comedy films Steve Massa, although her books are for the most part "a very accurate retelling of her time in Hollywood," she "goes off the rails in her retelling of the deaths of Joe Martin and Charlie." He argues that Cary's account is likely from "stories that Cary was told instead of things she experienced herself."

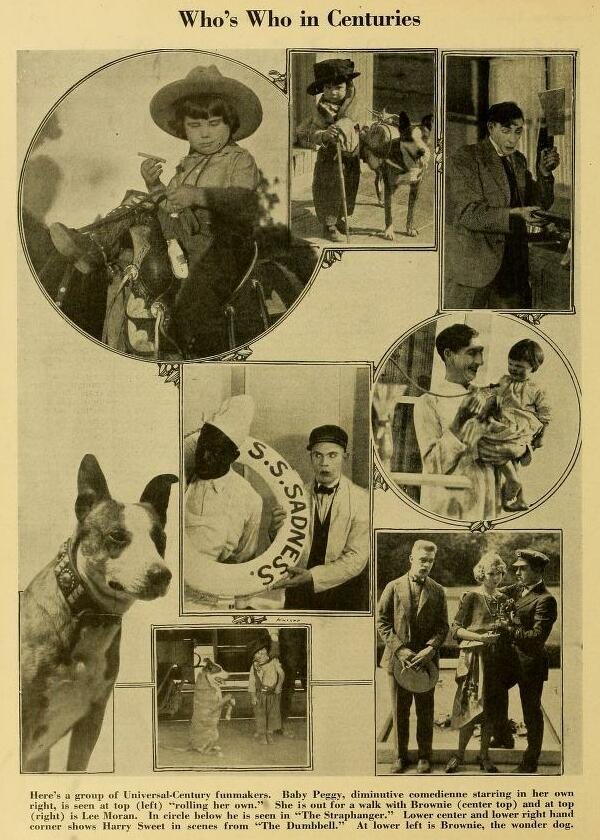
Who's Who in Centuries: Baby Peggy and Brownie the Wonder Dog, circa 1922

In Cary's Whatever Happened to Baby Peggy?, she claims that she was in the midst of filming with "Joe Martin the chimpanzee" when, somewhere backstage, Joe Martin bit Curly Stecker's wife. Despite the helpless pleadings of producer Julius Stern, Stecker knocked out Joe Martin with a crowbar, strapped him to a dental chair on set, pulled out all of his teeth with pliers and then, when he came to his senses, killed Joe Martin with a single shot to the brain. Later in Cary's telling, Curly Stecker confessed to Cary and her father in a private conversation in the Universal barn that he's always had a tense relationship with Charlie the Elephant. "A week later" Cary and her father overheard Stecker and Charlie in battle, and with Cary as an eyewitness, Stecker was left "crushed and broken…the luckless trainer…lay in the bloodied dust" as a propman found "Stecker's big gun" and killed Charlie with "three blasts from the powerful weapon."

A pair of reference librarians who used Joe Martin as an example of how to evaluate sources wrote, "We can find nothing to confirm Cary's story, and a number of things to refute it…We saw Cary cited numerous times, but there are flaws in her account. It's important to remember that she 'witnessed' this event at a very young age. Cary then wrote her autobiography in 1996, at the age of 78, a full 73 years after the supposed incident occurred. We need to at least consider that Cary may be misremembering a moment from her youth, if not imagining an incident that never really took place…While this is a trivial exercise in chasing down materials, it does point to a larger problem. Baby Peggy's account has been cited a number of times, even though it seems not to be true. Repetition does not always equate to authority."

Cary’s memoir has led to confusion about whether or not Joe Martin comedies were associated with the Stern brothers comedy operation. Thomas Reeder, author of the major Stern brothers filmography, concluded the Joe Martin comedies were not Stern-affiliated and suggests, "[Cary] may have misremembered Mrs. Joe Martin as Joe." Cary was often directed by Fred Fishback; Fishback was in charge of the Mrs. Joe Martin (chimpanzee) films. Cary places Julius Stern on the scene of Stecker killing Joe Martin, but the history of the Stern brothers comedy operation states "the Sterns had no direct involvement with any of the [Joe Martin films].” Of course, the Stern brothers could possibly have had indirect involvement in the Joe Martin films in that Carl Laemmle was their brother-in-law and Carl Laemmle Jr. their nephew. (Note: Carl Laemmle married Abe and Julius' sister Recha Stern in 1898.)

As mentioned by the library research team, primary sources and film history books largely fail to validate Cary's narrative.

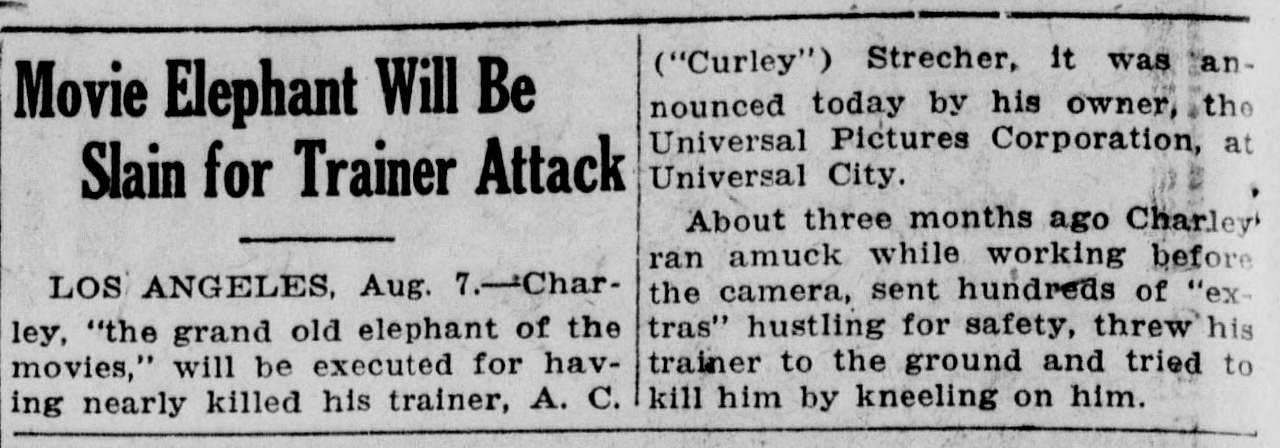
Report in California newspaper, August 1923

According to one newspaper report in 1921, Joe Martin may very well have bitten Curly Stecker's wife Ethel, while shooting A Monkey Bellhop. According to the article, Curly Stecker volunteered to remove Joe Martin's "tusks," rather than kill Joe Martin, which was the legally prescribed penalty. Stecker apparently would do the operation himself; a dental chair is mentioned in the article. This report or similar is likely the origin of Cary's version.

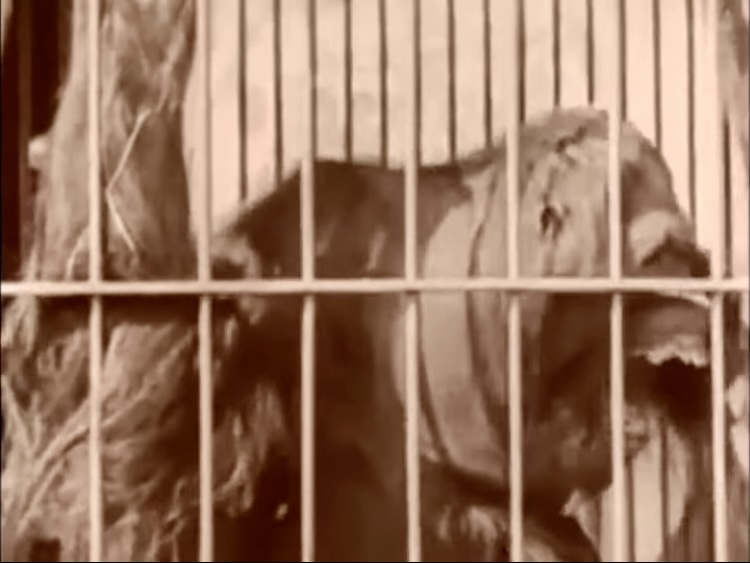
Joe Martin's character reacts to the villain's attempt to kill his owner (Merry-Go-Round, 1923)

However, Universal, Al G. Barnes, Frank Buck, film history books, and multiple press outlets all agree that Joe Martin was sold to the circus, and he appears to have both toured the country and been exhibited for several years in "Monkeyville" (a local derisive description of Barnes City, California).

Multiple newspaper articles from the second half of 1923 report on the studio's deliberations about Charlie the Elephant's fate—whether or not he would be euthanized was a decision reportedly made by Carl Laemmle himself, and multiple methods of execution were considered. While there is debate about how Charlie was dispatched, and the preponderance of evidence points to garroting—although some sources do say the studio settled upon gunshot—no sources assert summary execution of an elephant worth thousands of dollars.

As for Curley Stecker, multiple newspaper accounts relate that he was not killed immediately. He succumbed to his injuries after being hospitalized or suffering at his home in Lankershim for the better part of the year. Stecker's death certificate says that he died June 17, 1924, at Hollywood Hospital of myelogenous leukemia complicated by wild animal injury.

== See also ==
- Universal Studios Lot
- Universal City, California
- Selig Zoo
- Griffith Park Zoo
- Elephant execution in the United States
