= Providencia Ranch =

Early film location for Universal and Paramount, now Forest Lawn Cemetery

Coordinates: 34.1654°N 118.3310°W

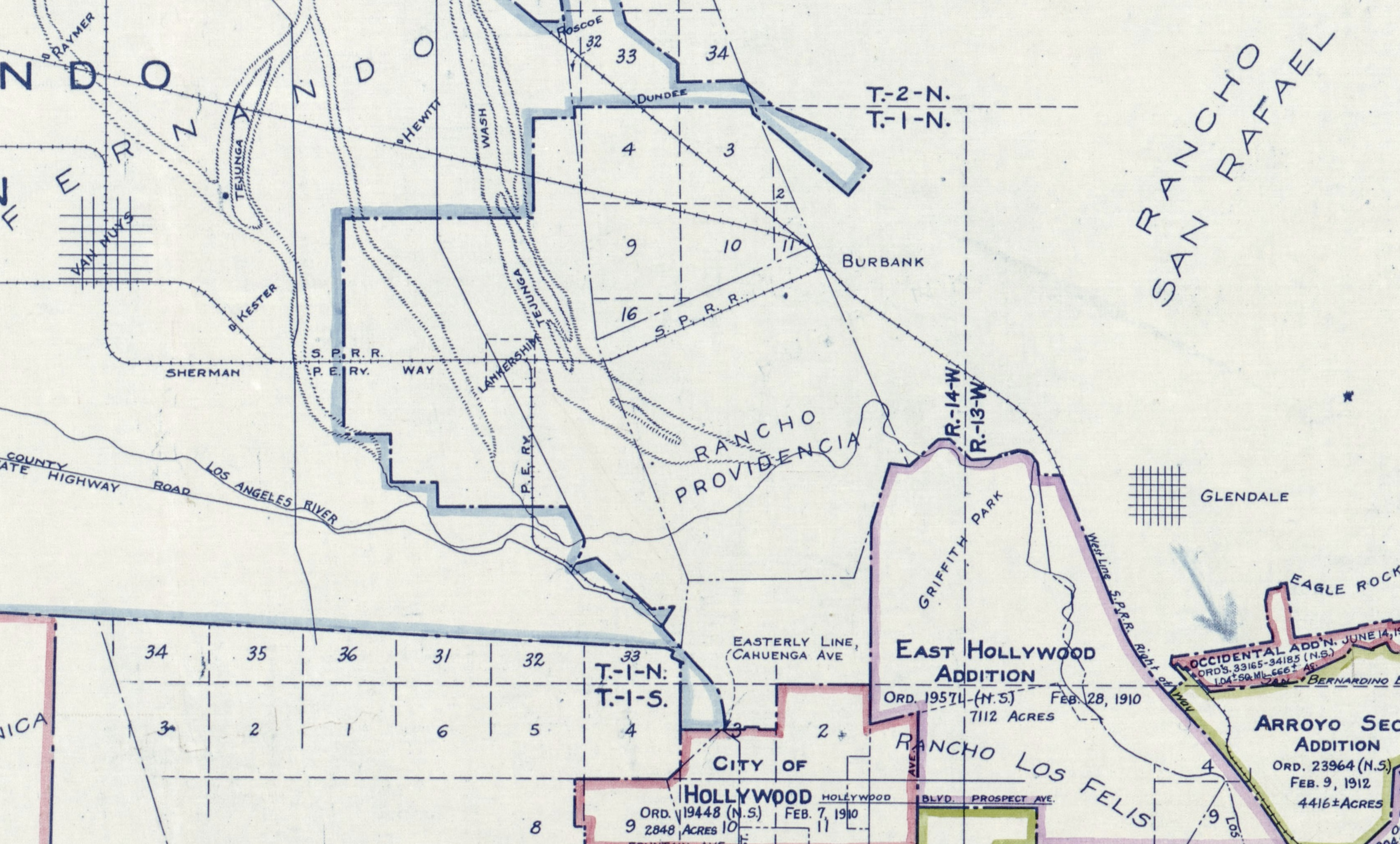
Rancho Providencia, Lankershim, Van Nuys, Cahuenga Pass, Burbank, Glendale, Tujunga Wash, Griffith Park, and rail lines, as mapped in 1916

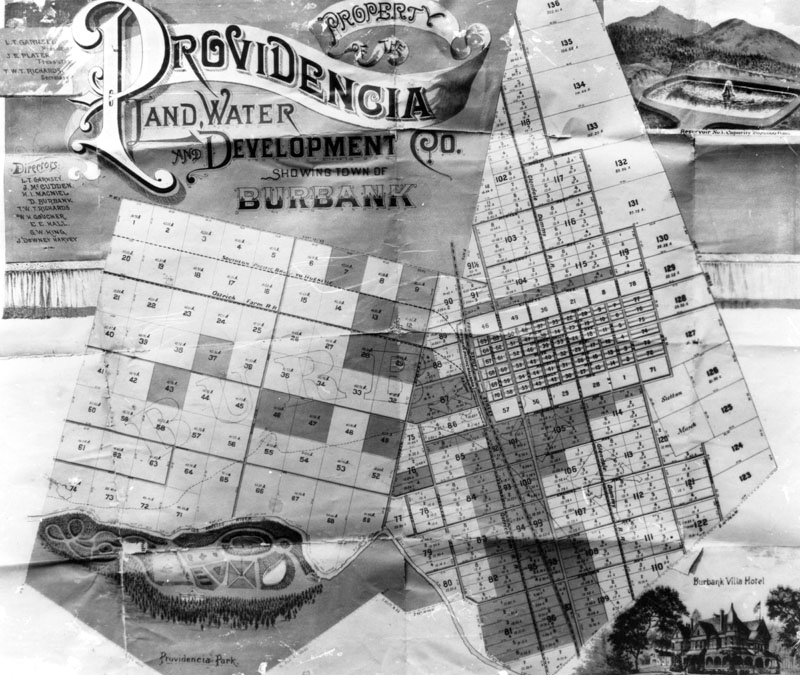
Early map of Burbank, California with Forest Lawn Hollywood Hills on the bottom left

Providencia Ranch, part of Providencia Land and Water Development Company property named for the Rancho Providencia Mexican land grant, was a property in California, US. It was used as a filming location for the American Civil War battle scenes in The Birth of a Nation (1915) and other silent motion pictures. The valley was also the site for two Universal Studios west coast operations in 1914.

== Early Universal Ranch (1912-1914) ==
Alternative names of this filming site include Providencia flats, Nestor Ranch, Oak Ranch, Oak Crest Ranch, Universal's Old Ranch, and Universal Ranch (Providencia site) versus Universal City (Lankershim site).

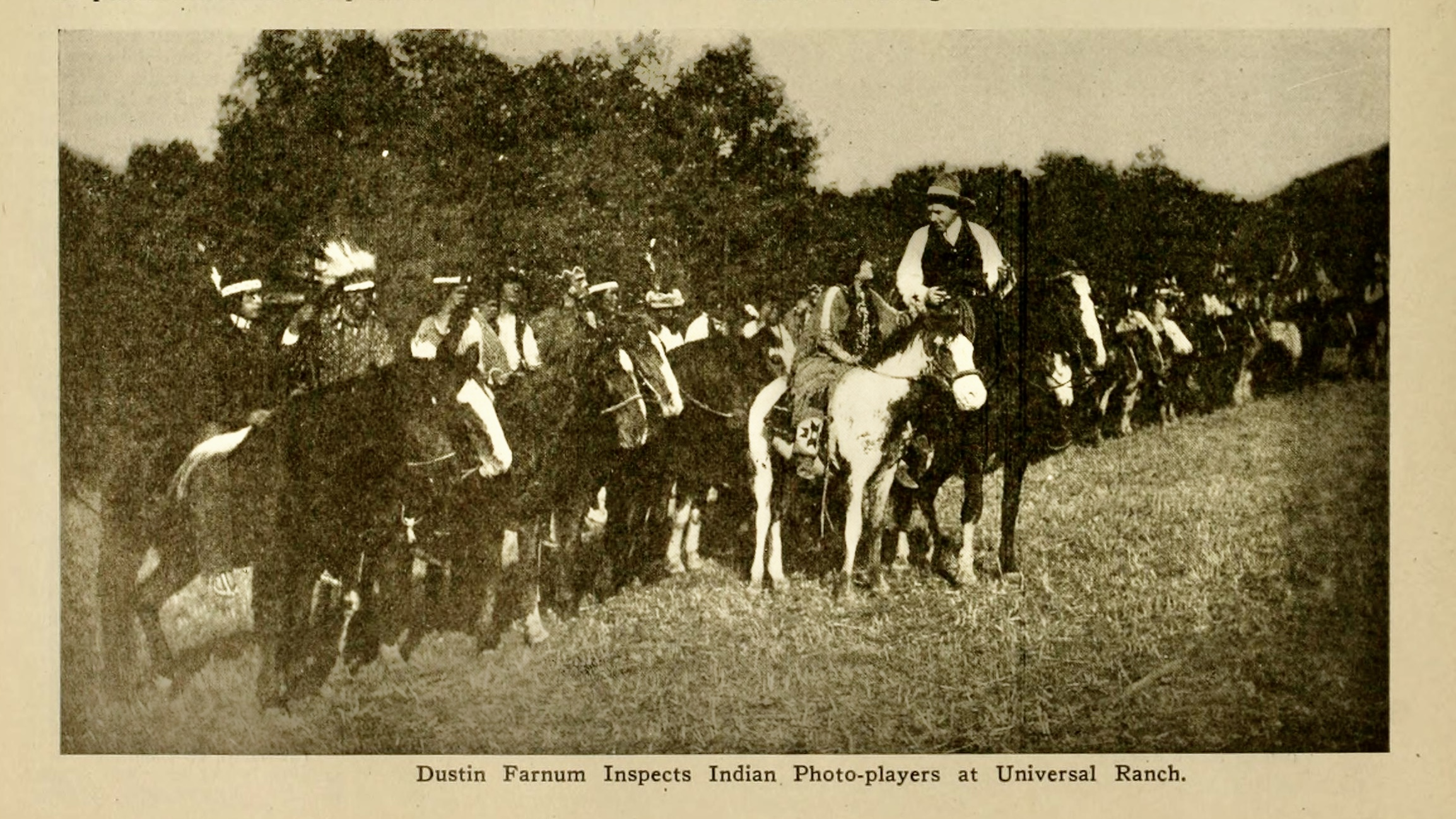
Filming a western at the Universal Ranch (Moving Picture World, 1913)

Universal Film Manufacturing Company took over the west coast assets of Nestor Studios. This included a studio in Hollywood and ranch land in the San Fernando Valley. The Nestor Ranch was located on 'Providencia Land and Water Development Company' property east of the river, just below Cahuenga Peak. The lease was said to be for 1,299 acres (5.26 km^{2}).

Makeshift stages were set up on the 'Oak Crest Ranch' property and the production of western films began at the former 'Nestor Ranch' site in 1912. On December 6, 1912, an informal studio opening was held at the Oak Crest property The public was invited to tour the Oak Crest Ranch and watch a Bison Pictures cowboys and Indians battle.

Carl Laemmle, founder of Universal, saw the Oak Crest site as too small to consolidate all the west coast operations. He ordered the purchase of larger property from the Lankershim Land, Water Development Co. The Lankershim site contained several tracts of land, including Taylor Ranch.

Consolidation began in 1914, with the relocation of several small buildings from the Sunset Gower Studios (former Blondeau Tavern) studio and Oak Crest Ranch property.

The sets were destroyed and the site abandoned in 1914, but reacquired in 1915.

After the official opening of the new Lankershim Universal City site in 1915, the Providencia ranch (Oak Crest) property became known as the Universal Ranch.

The three sections of the Lankershim property were referred to as the Universal Back Ranch and contained the Universal City Zoo, cafe, horse corral and stage 2.

The Taylor ranch bordering on Lankershim Blvd. was divided by a stream. It contained the studio front lot and the backlot on the east side of the stream. The photographs of the Providencia Ranch land, "A Birds Eye View of Universal City", can be seen in the Los Angeles Image Archives.

Universal still had control of the property as of March 1917.

Since 1950, this area has been home to Forest Lawn Memorial Park.

== The Birth of a Nation (1915) ==
The Providencia Land and Water Development Company property was used for the battle scenes in The Birth of a Nation. Billy Bitzer illustrates the location of the battle scenes by his hand drawn map.

== Lasky Ranch (1918) ==
"The Famous Players - Lasky Corporation have secured the old Universal Ranch, a 1,000 acres (4.0 km^{2}) tract within five minutes of Hollywood at a cost said to be $1,000,000. The site will be used for permanent sets and the first Picture will be a revival of The Squaw Man, which Cecil B. DeMille is to direct."

== Paramount Ranch ==
Paramount ranch: LA Times announced on November 20, 1927: "With one gesture a 1,000 acre ranch is being abandoned."

== External media ==
Los Angeles Public Library

- November 24, 1913 Bailey, Chas. Z. Universal City
- 1911 Nestor Filmmakers at the Forest Lawn Site
- 1911 Nestor Filmmakers at the Forest Lawn Site
- 1911 Nestor Sunset and Gower

Motion PIcture Arts and Science – UCLA (picasa)

- Universal City 1912
- Universal City 1913

== Notes ==
- Universal Studios Historic District consists of two studio sites in the San Fernando Valley.
- 1912-1914, Providencia Land and Water Development Company, the site today of Forest Lawn in the Hollywood Hills.
- 1914 Lankershim Land and Water Development Company, the site today of Universal City.
