= Big Otto =

American circus owner, film producer (1866–1928)

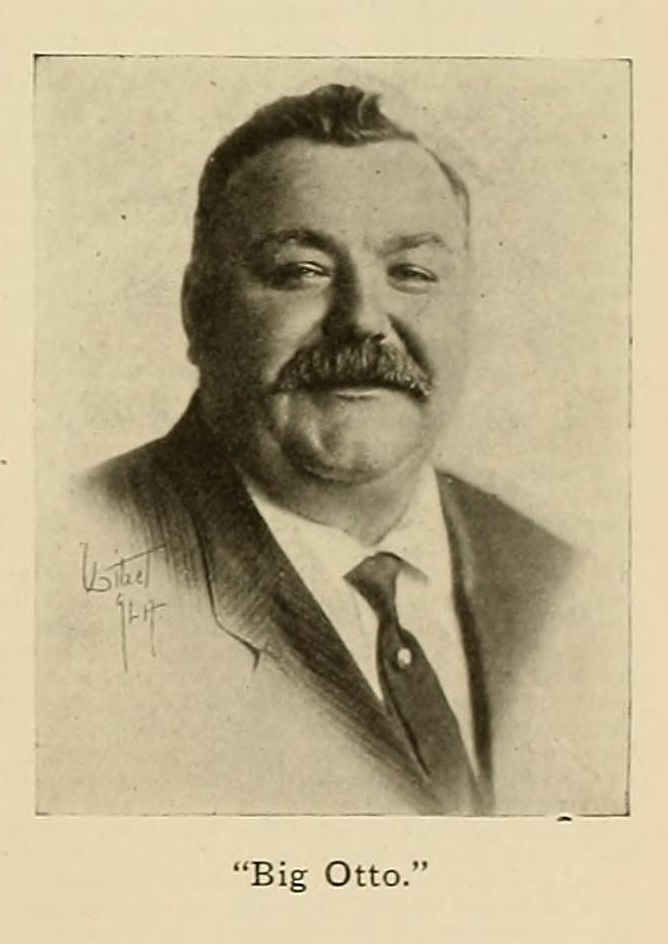
- Moving Picture World, 1914
- Born: Otto Ferdinand Breitkreutz; April 12, 1866; Milwaukee, Wisconsin
- Died: December 25, 1928 (aged 62); Glendale, California
- Occupations: Animal trainer, circus owner, zoo director, filmmaker
- Years active: 1900–1920

Otto F. Breitkreutz (April 16, 1866 – December 25, 1928), universally known as Big Otto, was an American circus man and film producer during the early 20th century. He was called Big Otto because he weighed somewhere between 350–480 lb (160–220 kg) and was "big in heart and policy."

== Biography ==
He came to fame with Big Otto's Trained Wild Animals, a circus that exhibited around the Midwest and the east coast of the U.S., including at Eau Claire's Annual Agricultural Street Fair and Carnival in 1904, Chicago's White City Amusement Park in 1906, and Tennessee's Appalachian Exposition in 1910. In 1908 Big Otto's Circus wintered in Chicago and among the staffmembers was a Little Otto, more formally named Gust Breitkreutz. Big Otto's Animals eventually became the Big Otto Combined Shows, wherein the wild animals were but one part of a larger traveling carnival, along with a Ferris wheel, Turner's World Wonder, Mets the Scientific Wonder, and Millie Christine the Carolina Twin. For the Appalachian Exposition at Knoxville in 1910, Big Otto traveled with 100 animals in 21 wagons, 30 employees, and a press agent.

According to one report, due to his failure to pay a debt, Breitkruetz's animal collection was transferred to ownership of film producer William Selig; Big Otto's wild animals became the core of the Selig Zoo. According to an interview with William Selig published in 1928, "I chanced to meet Al Ringling on the street; he told me of an itinerant showman named Big Otto, who had a small menagerie in Milwaukee. The next day I traveled to Milwaukee and engaged the outfit to come to Chicago." They began making animal films in Chicago, including The Lion Tamer (1909), which may have featured Big Otto in the title role. Meanwhile a "White City [amusement park] had failed at Jacksonville, Florida." Selig bought that land and the Big Otto/Selig combined menagerie filmed several movies there during the winter of 1911–12. Selig eventually purchased all of Big Otto's animals and hired Breitkreutz to manage Selig's Wild Animal Farm in Santa Monica. (A new zoo director was installed in 1915 when the operation moved to the site near Los Angeles' Eastlake Park.) In 1912 a reviewer of Selig Polyscope's film Kings of the Forest made a point to connect the success of Selig's animal movies to Breitkreutz's skill as a trainer:

The Selig series of films in which wild animals played their parts created great interest and equally as great surprise at the time of their releases, nearly two years ago...Although his name does not appear in the cast of characters, nor he himself in the pictures, "Big Otto," Selig's wild animal expert, may well be termed the mainspring of action, so far as the acting of the majestic lions and the big cat-like leopards are concerned. Otto's wonderful handling of these savage animals, out in the open, is truly a marvel of skillful training and control.

In 1913, Breitkreutz directed at least two films for Selig Polyscope, one called The Artist and the Brute, and the other called The Wise Old Elephant, starring Kathlyn Williams. Big Otto is credited with the scenario (screenplay) for Selig's Alone in the Jungle. In 1914 Big Otto Pictures released The Mysterious Man of the Jungle, a four-reel feature. Around 1915, Big Otto bought land between Los Angeles and Pasadena where he kept an animal collection sometimes called Big Otto Zoo.

In 1918 Breitkreutz was indicted by a grand jury for mail fraud due to his involvement in a shady plan to sell horse meat to the U.S. government to feed prisoners of war. The charges were dropped for insufficient evidence. Breitkreutz was also involved in some kind of gold mining syndicate or scheme that was called, naturally, Big Otto Mines.

In May 1928, famous film cowboy Tom Mix mentioned Breitkreutz in Photoplay magazine, "Big Otto, I may say, is still a-livin' an' still got an animal show. His good lookin' daughter is married to a young feller named Furness, one of the owners of the Continental an' a lot of other hotels 'round Los Angeles an' San Francisco."

Otto F. Breitkreutz died in Los Angeles in December 1928.

== Personal life ==
Breitkruetz was born in 1866 in Milwaukee, Wisconsin. His parents Ferdinand and Marie (Kehl) Breitkreutz were both natives of Prussia and had at least 11 children, of which Otto was the sixth by birth order. In 1890, Breitkreutz married Laura Larson in Milwaukee County. At the time of the 1910 U.S. census, Breitkreutz was living in Wisconsin with his wife Laura, and two teenage daughters, Ruth and Laurine. According to Motography, Big Otto also had an adopted daughter, Olga, known professionally as Princess Cecelia. (Note: Princess "Cecelia" is almost certainly Olga Celeste, a big-cat trainer who prepared the animals for Bringing Up Baby, et al. She joined Big Otto's operation in her teens but was probably not legally adopted by him.)

== Gallery ==
Big Otto Projects
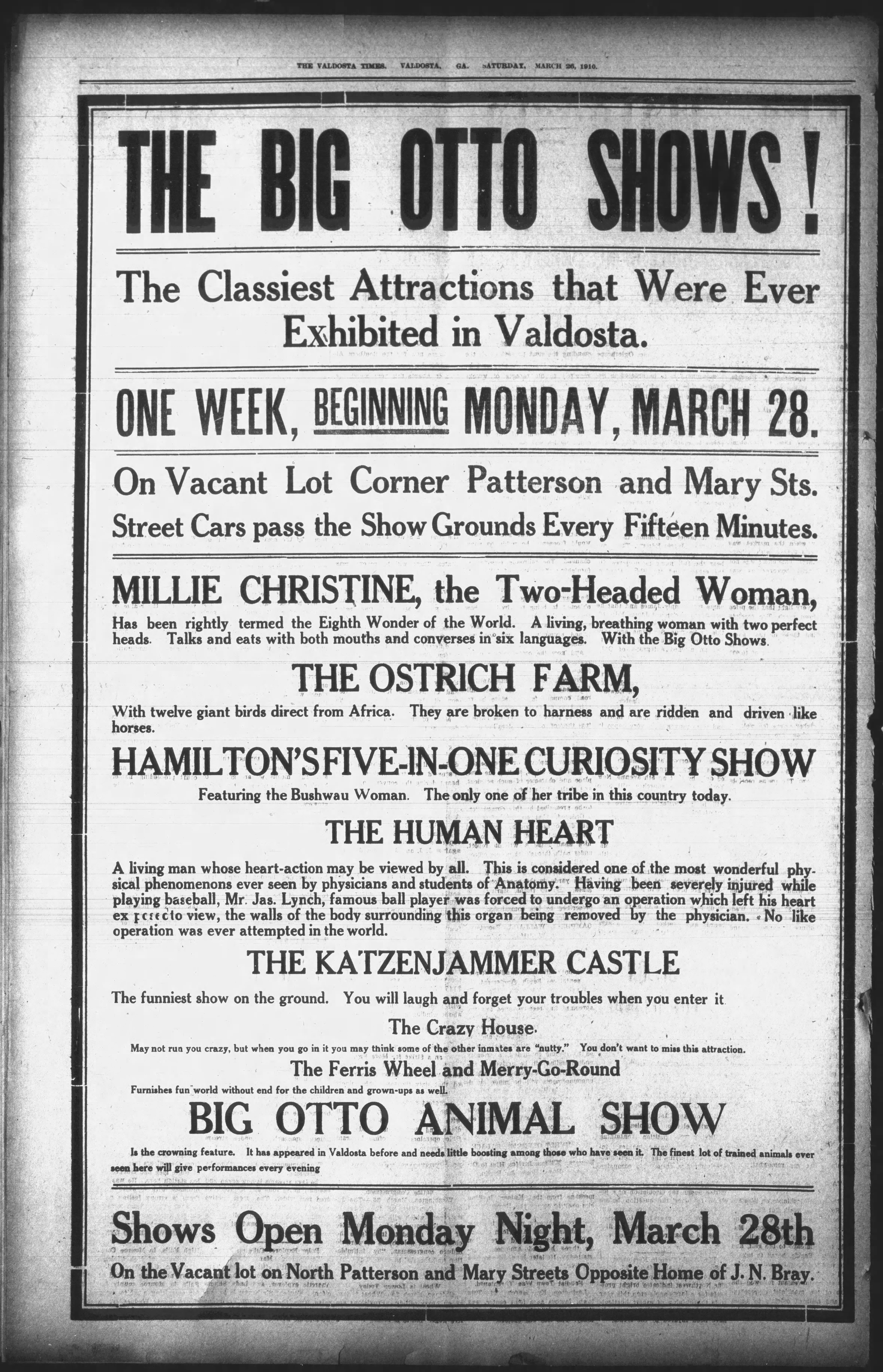
Big Otto Shows advertisement (Valdosta Times, Georgia, 1910)

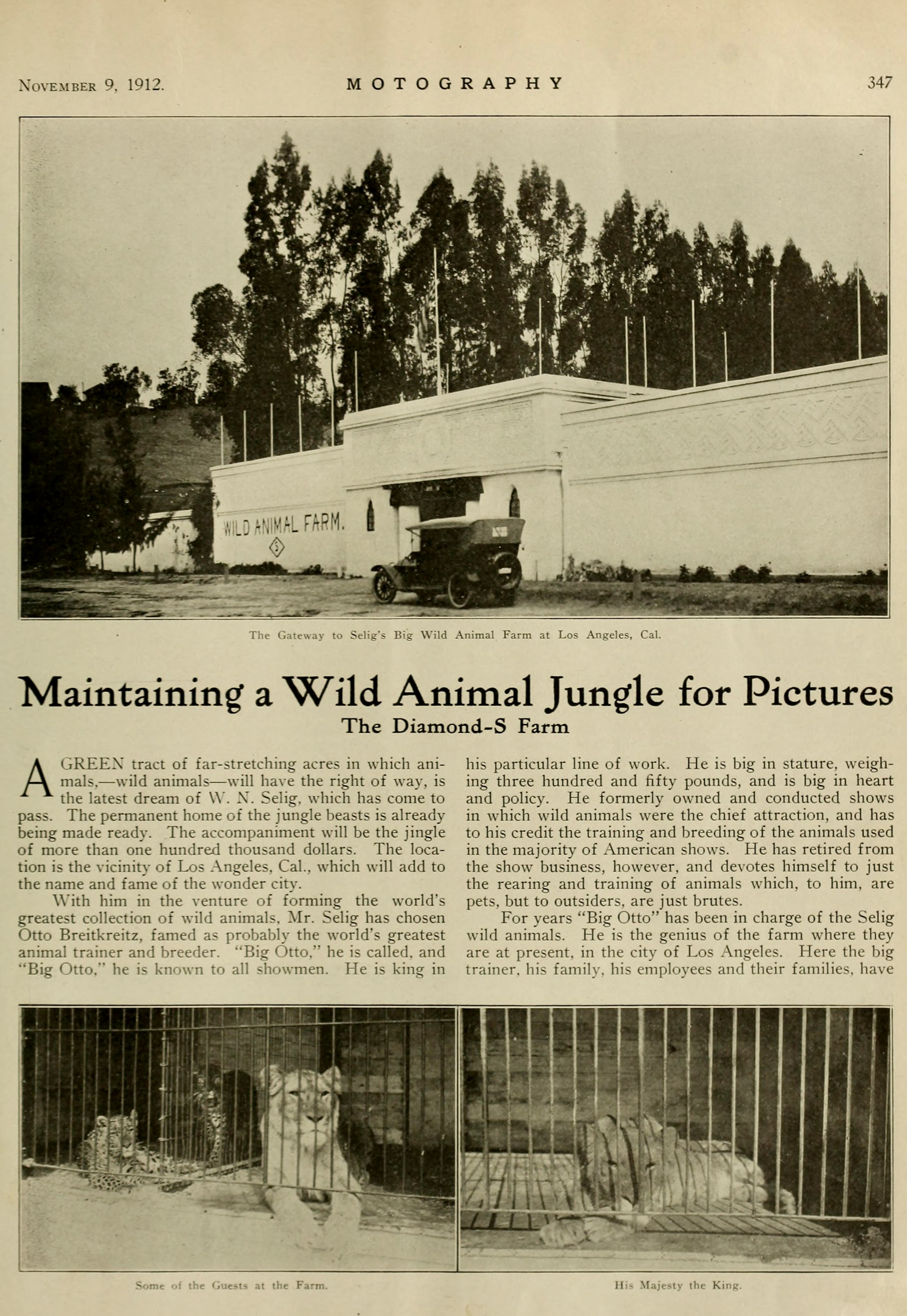
Big Otto managed Selig's Wild Animal Farm in Santa Monica

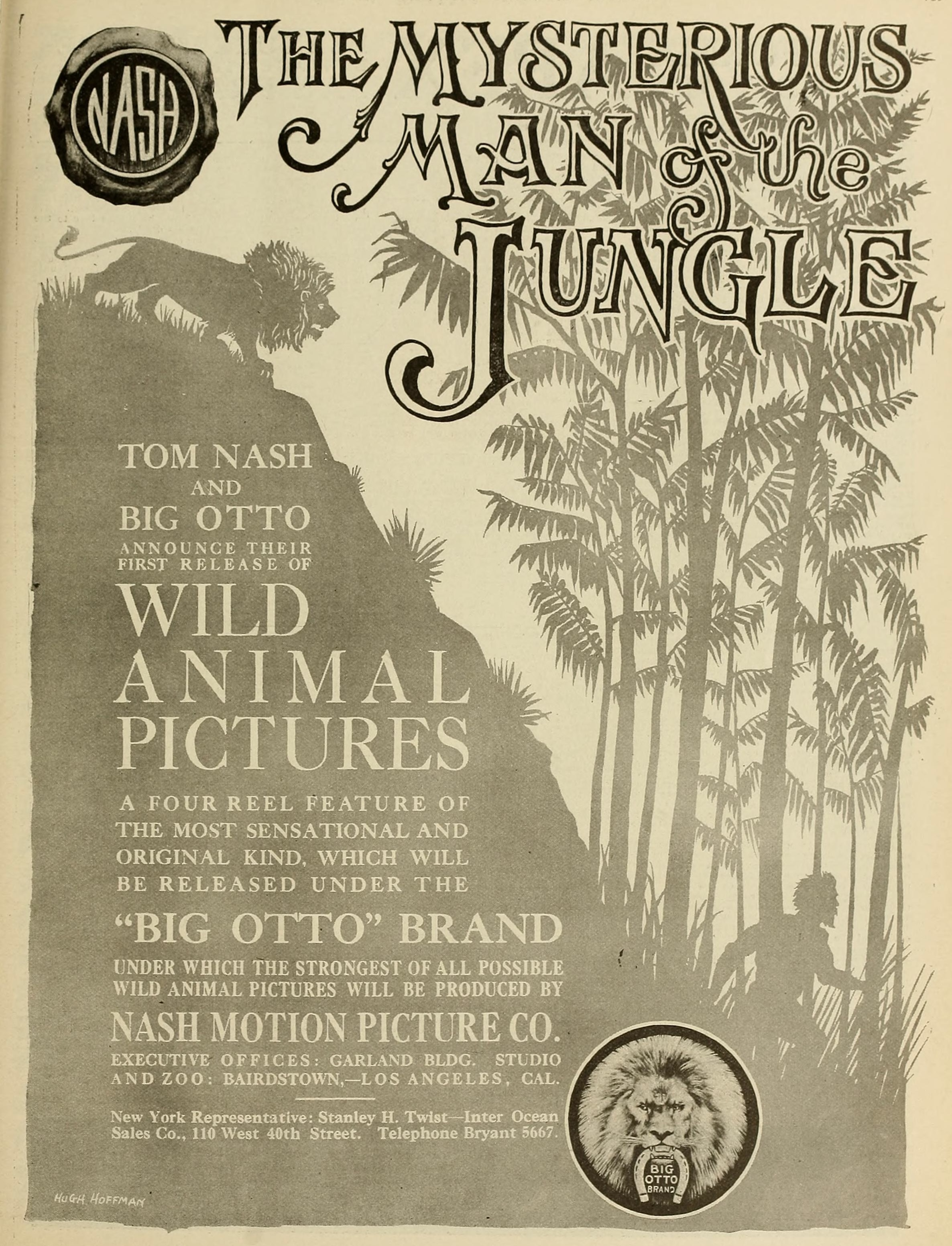
The Mysterious Man of the Jungle advertisement (Moving Picture World, 1914)

== See also ==
- Curley Stecker, animal trainer
- Olga Celeste, animal trainer
