= Black diamond rattlesnake =

Black diamond rattlesnake may refer to:

- Crotalus o. oreganus, also known as the Pacific rattlesnake, a venomous pitviper subspecies found from British Columbia, Canada, south through the United States into California
- Crotalus cerberus, also known as the Arizona black rattlesnake, a venomous pitviper species found in the southwestern United States
- Crotalus helleri, also known as the Southern Pacific rattlesnake, a venomous pitviper species found in South-West California and south into Baja California
