= Kapapa Island =

- U.S. National Register of Historic Places
- U.S. Historic district
- Location within Hawaii
- Location: Kāne'ohe Bay, O'ahu
- Coordinates: 21°28′37″N 157°47′55″W
- Area: 7 acres
- NRHP reference No.: 72000430
- Added to NRHP: August 21, 1972

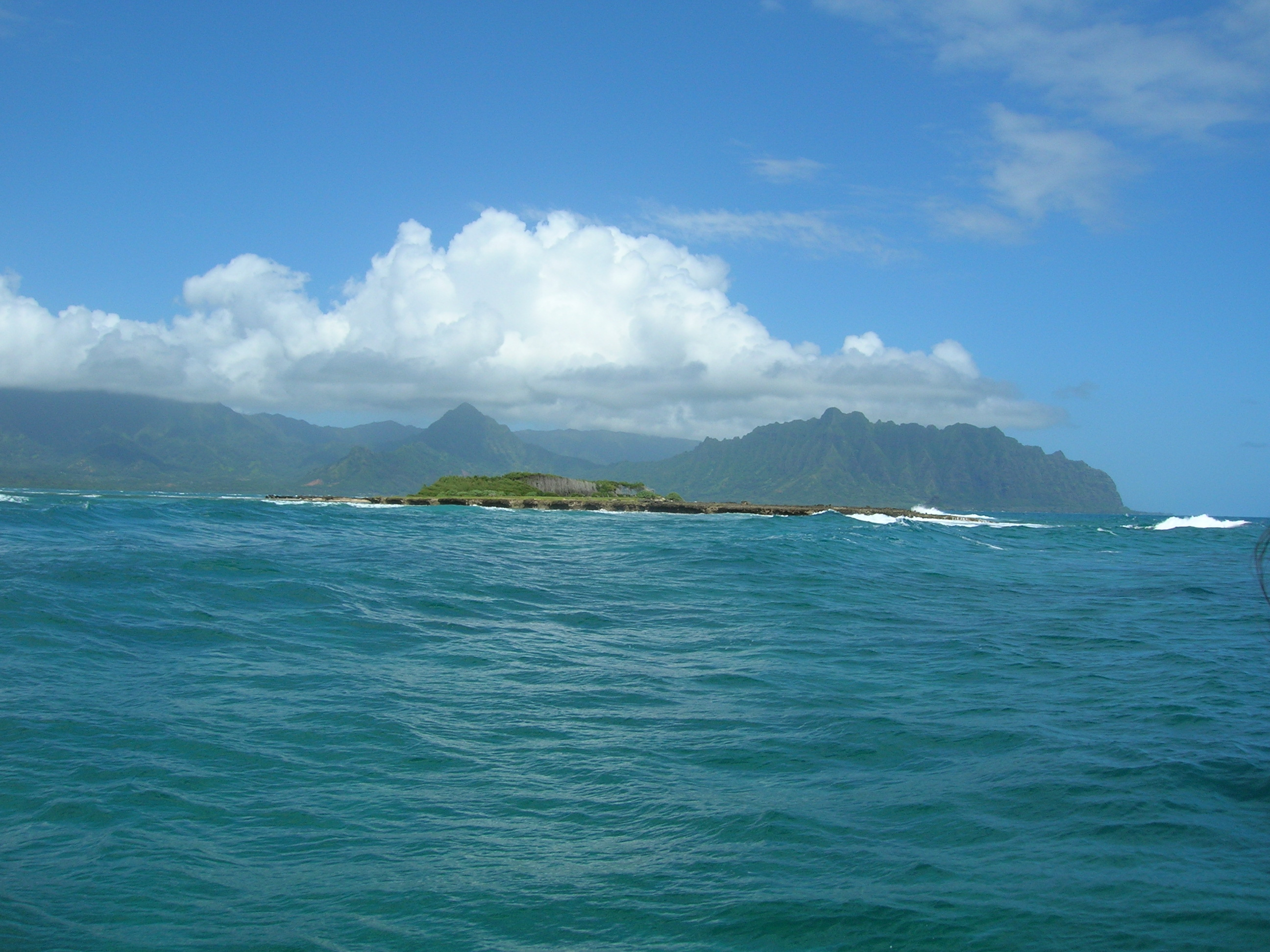
Kapapa, as seen from a boat

Kapapa Island is a flat, uninhabited island in the Hawaiian archipelago in the Pacific Ocean. It is located in Kāne'ohe Bay about two kilometers off the east coast of the island of O'ahu.

Kapapa was used as a place of worship by Ancient Hawaiians, and contains a heiau. It was included as Kapapa Island Complex and Historic District in the National Register of Historic Places.

Beginning in 1917, the island's wildlife resources have been protected. In 1932 a wildlife reservation executive order was issued, and in 2010, the Department of Land and Natural Resources announced it would be protected by rule as a wildlife sanctuary.
