= Gay's Lion Farm =

Tourist attraction in El Monte, California, United States (1925–1942)

Coordinates: 34.0689°N 118.0293°W

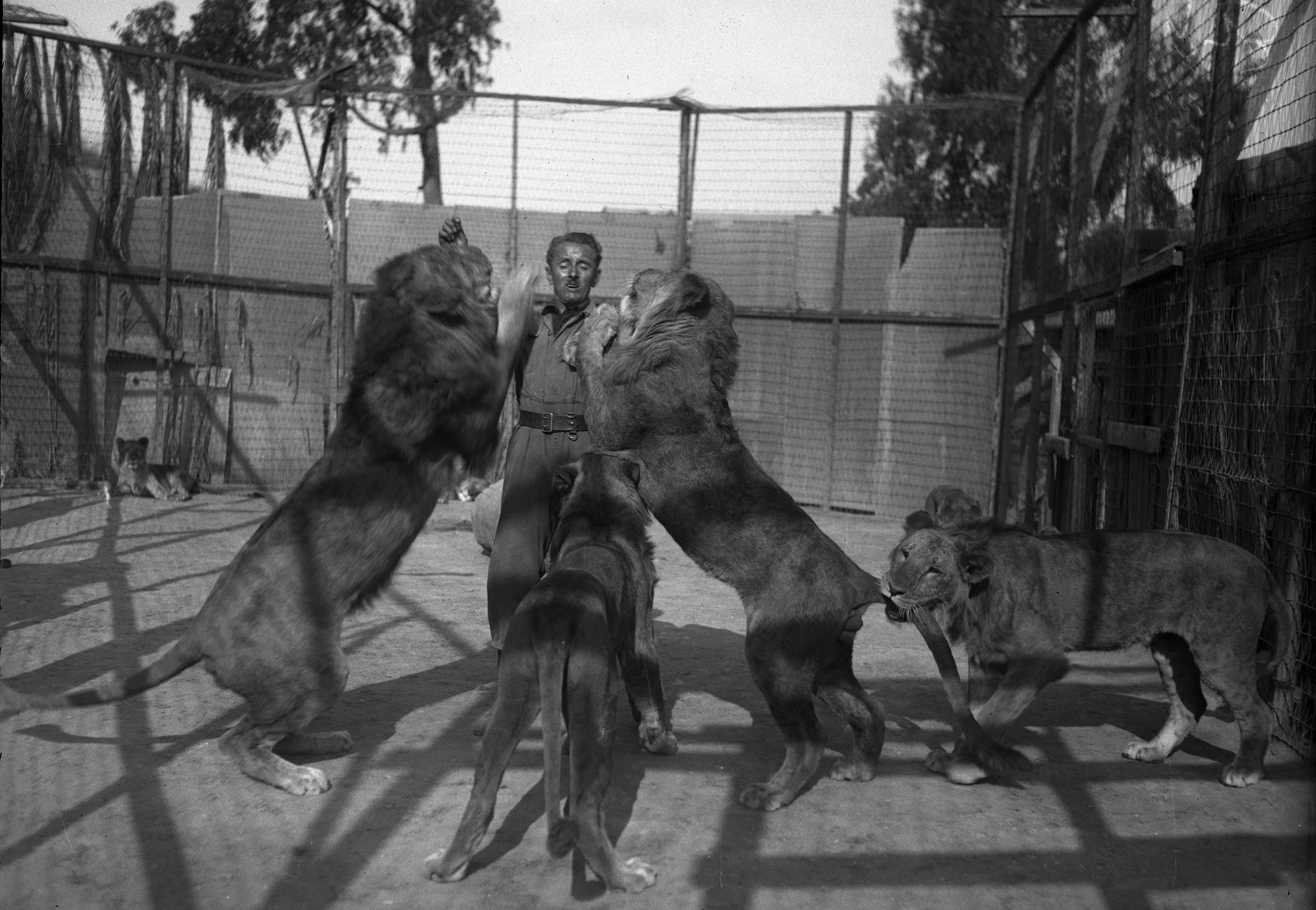
- Charles Gay with four lions
- Interactive map of Gay's Lion Farm
- Date opened: 1925
- Date closed: 1942
- Location: El Monte, California
- Land area: 5 acres
- No. of animals: 200 lions
- Owner: Charles and Muriel Gay
- Management: Charles Gay

Gay's Lion Farm was a public selective breeding facility and tourist attraction just west of the south-east junction of Peck Road and Valley Boulevard in El Monte, California. It operated from 1925 through 1942, when it was closed temporarily due to wartime meat shortages. It never reopened.

== Early years ==
Founders Charles and Muriel Gay were Anglo-French circus performers who arrived in Los Angeles in 1914. They established an attraction in MacArthur Park (then known as Westlake Park) where the public could watch Charles Gay working with three adult lions. The lions were trained as animal actors in the burgeoning motion picture industry.

Needing more room for their animals, the Gays found a large plot of un-zoned property in El Monte, east of Los Angeles, where in 1925 they opened Gay's Lion Farm, a public attraction dedicated to the breeding, training and exhibition of African lions. The Farm quickly became one of the most popular tourist attractions in the Southland, doing a brisk trade in souvenir photographic postcards. Among the famous animals raised on the Farm were Metro-Goldwyn-Mayer Studio lions Slats (1924–1927, died in 1935 at the Philadelphia Zoo) and his lookalike successor Jackie, and the celebrated comic lion Numa (1912–1930, died of old age at 41), named for the lion in the Tarzan books. Slats, Numa, and Jackie (the friendliest of the three) appeared as one lion in Charlie Chaplin's The Circus (1928).

The 5-acre (2.0 ha) farm with its thatched roof, African-inspired architecture (a likely inspiration for Walt Disney's Adventureland), was a U-shaped compound, with separate cages for each adult cat, a nursery, and a central caged arena where Charles Gay, with whip and gun, performed a classic lion tamer act for the crowds. Feedings were also a big draw, with a ton of meat being consumed daily.

In 1925, El Monte High School adopted the Lions name for its teams, and the Gays provided a lion mascot named Elmo for big games.

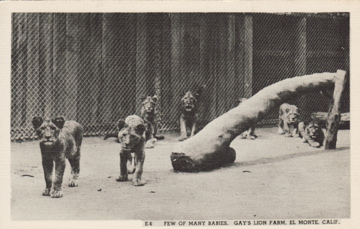
"Few of many babies" postcard from Gay's Lion Farm.

== Visitors ==
Starting in 1927, the Farm hosted organized visits from men's clubs, such as the Lions Club and the Adventurers Club. These events centered on outdoor banquets set in a clearing among the animal cages, at which guests were served small samples of barbecued lion meat in addition to steak and chicken. An honored guest at these meals, toasted and encouraged to walk the length of the table, was Numa the lion.

When Greta Garbo first came to Hollywood in 1926, she didn't speak much English. Publicist Don Gillum arranged a publicity stunt at the Farm where the actress was to be photographed cuddling lion cubs, and in a stunt cage so it looked like she was sitting with Numa. Although Gillum told her what she would be doing, Garbo didn't recognize the word lion, and so didn't realize what was in store for her until she was almost in the cage, at which point she shrieked "Oh! Dos terrible animals!" But she was a good sport and posed for the pictures.

Other well-known visitors included Albert Einstein, Eleanor Roosevelt and Marie Dressler.

== Lions escape ==
In September 1928, while the Gays were traveling in Europe, a trainer failed to close a runway while lions Ike and Short-Tail were being moved between cages. The lion made a dash for freedom, and slashed the arm of farm manager John Rounan at the moment Rounan fired a shot at the animal; the wound required 100 stitches, and Rounan later died. Trainer Joe Hoffman took off after the lion and felled him with a bullet in the brain. Short-Tail walked into an open cage, and Hoffman was able to lock him in. But Ike got shot in the leg and ran around the farm in a rage, menacing a cow, a cage full of baby lions and arriving police officers. Ike finally died in a hail of bullets from many guns. This incident provided inspiration for hard-boiled author James M. Cain's short story "The Baby in the Icebox," which in turn inspired his celebrated novel The Postman Always Rings Twice.

== The late years ==
At its high point, there were more than 200 adult lions living at the Farm. The farm closed in December 1942, when wartime rationing made it impossible to get the ton of horse meat required daily for the cats, and the lions were loaned to zoos around the country. But by the time the war ended, Charles Gay was too ill to reclaim his cats. He retired to Balboa Island, where he died in 1950. He is buried at San Gabriel Cemetery.

The site of the Farm is now an overpass of Interstate 10, the location distinguished by a life-sized bronze statue of a male lion behind a chain link fence beside the sidewalk. A larger lion statue, which was commissioned for the Farm, stands in front of nearby El Monte High School.

== See also ==
- List of defunct amusement parks
- Jungleland USA
