= Daniels (surname) =

Daniels is a patronymic surname meaning "son of Daniel". It may refer to:

== Disambiguation pages ==
- Alan Daniels (disambiguation)
- Anthony Daniels (disambiguation)
- Brian Daniels (disambiguation)
- Carrie Daniels (disambiguation)
- Charles Daniels (disambiguation)
- Charles N. Daniels (disambiguation)
- Charlie Daniels (disambiguation)
- David Daniels (disambiguation)
- George Daniels (disambiguation)
- Jack Daniels (disambiguation)
- Jeffrey Daniels (disambiguation)
- Joe Daniels (disambiguation)
- John Daniels (disambiguation)
- Jonathan Daniels (disambiguation)
- Lisa Daniels (disambiguation)
- Mike Daniels (disambiguation)
- Peter Daniels (disambiguation)
- Raymond Daniels (disambiguation)
- Robin Daniels (disambiguation)
- Ronald Daniels (disambiguation)
- Scott Daniels (disambiguation)
- Shawn Daniels (disambiguation)
- William Daniels (disambiguation)

== Surname ==
=== Arts, media, and literature ===
- Alyssa Daniels, American web designer
- Annette Daniels, American mezzo-soprano opera singer
- Anthony Daniels, English actor
- Bebe Daniels, American actress
- Ben Daniels, English actor who has won a Laurence Olivier Theatre Award
- Billy Daniels, American big band singer and actor
- Chad Daniels, comedian
- Charles Daniels (tenor), English classical singer
- Charles N. Daniels, American songwriter who composed under the pseudonym Neil Moret
- Charlie Daniels, American country music singer and musician
- Cora Linn Daniels (1852–?), American author
- Danny Daniels (1924–2017), American choreographer, tap dancer, and teacher
- David Daniels (countertenor) (born 1966), American operatic singer and countertenor
- David Daniels (poet), visual poet
- David Karsten Daniels, American songwriter and musician
- David Daniels (film), filmmaker
- Eddie Daniels, American musician
- Erin Daniels, American actress
- Faith Daniels, American television news anchor and talk-show host
- Frank Daniels, actor in early black and white films
- Greg Daniels, television comedy writer
- Jeff Daniels, American actor
- Jeffrey Daniels (author), American author
- Jesse Daniels, American sculptor and musician
- Jessie Daniels, American actress, songwriter, and Christian musician
- Jim Daniels, American poet and writer
- Josephus Daniels, American diplomat, 41st United States Secretary of the Navy
- Kevin Daniels, American actor
- LaShawn Daniels, American songwriter
- Leonard Daniels, British artist
- Lee Daniels, American film and television writer, director and producer
- Les Daniels, American writer of literary criticism, cultural studies and historical horror fiction
- Marc Daniels, American television director
- Mark Daniels, American architect, landscape architect, and civil engineer
- Martin Daniels, English magician and entertainer
- Mickey Daniels, American child actor
- Owen Daniels (actor), American actor
- Paul Daniels (1938–2016), British stage magician
- Phil Daniels, English actor
- Rik Daniëls, Belgian television director
- Rod Daniels, retired American television news anchor
- Ross Daniels, Australian actor and comedian
- Roy Daniells, Canadian poetry professor
- Sarah Daniels (playwright), British dramatist
- Spencer Daniels, American actor
- Stormy Daniels, American actress, screenwriter, and director
- Traa Daniels, bassist of southern California rock band P.O.D.
- William Daniels, American actor
- William Daniels (artist), British artist
- William H. Daniels, film cinematographer best known as Greta Garbo's personal lensman

=== Politics ===
- Charles Daniels (New York politician), U.S. Representative from New York
- Fletcher Daniels, American politician
- G. Lester Daniels, American politician from Delaware
- Hans Daniels (born 1934), German politician
- Hayzel Burton Daniels, American politician, lawyer, and judge from Arizona
- Jack Daniels (New Mexico politician), New Mexico politician and the head of an insurance agency
- John C. Daniels, mayor of New Haven, Connecticut
- Jonathan W. Daniels, shortest-serving White House Press Secretary
- Josephus Daniels, American politician and newspaper publisher
- Geraldine L. Daniels (1933–2012), New York politician
- Lee A. Daniels, Illinois State Representative
- Mitch Daniels, Governor of the state of Indiana
- Randy Daniels, Secretary of State of New York
- Ronald Daniels, third-party candidate in the 1992 U.S. presidential election

=== Science, math, and medicine ===
- Anthony Daniels (psychiatrist), English writer and retired physician
- Farrington Daniels, pioneer of the modern direct use of solar energy
- Henry Daniels (statistician), British statistician
- Patricia Daniels, American engineering educator
- William Daniels (automotive engineer), British car engineer

=== Sport ===
- Aidan Daniels, Canadian soccer player
- Antonio Daniels, American professional basketball player
- Arthur Daniels (rugby league), dual code rugby player
- Barney Daniels, English footballer
- Bert Daniels, American professional baseball player
- Braeden Daniels (born 2000), American football player
- Carl Daniels, professional boxer in the Light Middleweight division
- Charles Daniels (swimmer), American freestyle swimmer
- Charles F. Daniels, American baseball umpire
- Christopher Daniels, American professional wrestler, best known as "The Fallen Angel"
- Clem Daniels, American college and professional football player
- Darrell Daniels, American football player
- Darrion Daniels (born 1997), American football player
- David Daniels (basketball), Canadian basketball player
- Djenairo Daniels (born 2002), Dutch footballer
- Dominic Daniels, South African cricketer
- Dyson Daniels (born 2003), American basketball player
- Erik Daniels, American professional basketball player
- Gary Daniels, British born kickboxer, martial artist, and martial arts actor
- Gipsy Daniels, Welsh boxer
- Isabelle Daniels, American Olympic athlete
- Jack Daniels (baseball), Major League Baseball player
- Jack Daniels (coach), professor of physical education and cross-country running coach
- Jake Daniels, English footballer
- Jalon Daniels (born 2002), American football player
- James Daniels, American football player
- Jayden Daniels (born 2000), American football player
- Jayson Daniels, Australian rules footballer
- Jeff Daniels (ice hockey), professional ice hockey player
- Jon Daniels, American baseball manager
- JT Daniels (born 2000), American football player
- Kahzin Daniels (born 1995), American football player
- Kal Daniels, Major League Baseball outfielder
- Ken Daniels, sports announcer
- Kimbi Daniels, professional hockey player
- Law Daniels, major league baseball player
- LeShun Daniels (born 1995), American football player
- LeShun Daniels Sr. (born 1974), American football player
- Lloyd Daniels, American former professional basketball player
- Luke Daniels, English footballer
- Marquis Daniels, basketball player
- Mel Daniels, American former professional basketball player
- Owen Daniels (American football), American football tight end
- Phillip Daniels (born 1973), American football defensive end
- Phillip Daniels (offensive lineman) (born 2005), American football player
- P. J. Daniels, college running back
- Raymond Daniels (martial artist), American martial artist
- Robert Daniels (boxer), professional boxer in the Cruiserweight division
- Silas Daniels, professional American football wide receiver
- Torrance Daniels, American football linebacker
- Travis Daniels, American football player
- Troy Daniels, American basketball player

=== Other ===
- Arthur Grosvenor Daniells, Seventh-day Adventist minister and administrator
- Douglas Henry Daniels, American historian
- Edler von Daniels, German field general who fought in the Battle of Stalingrad
- Eliphalet Daniels, British Colonial America-born military commander
- Harry Daniels, English recipient of the Victoria Cross
- Jared W. Daniels (1827–1904), American physician, Indian agent, military officer
- Jonathan Myrick Daniels, Episcopal seminarian, killed for his work in the American civil rights movement
- Michael Daniels, British transpersonal psychologist and parapsychologist
- Robert V. Daniels (1926–2010), historian of Russia
- Tiffany Daniels, American woman missing from her Florida home since 2013

=== Fictional characters ===
- Cedric Daniels, a character from The Wire
- Chelsea Daniels, on the Disney Channel sitcom That's So Raven
- Crewman Daniels, from Star Trek: Enterprise
- David Daniels, a character from The Mummy
- Helen Daniels, in the Australian soap opera Neighbours
- Noah Daniels, from the FOX TV series 24
- Rosemary Daniels, in the Australian soap opera Neighbours
- Tug Daniels, in the HBO prison drama Oz

== See also ==
- Justice Daniels (disambiguation)
- Senator Daniels (disambiguation)
