= Daniels =

Daniels may refer to:

== People ==
- Daniels (surname)
- Daniels (given name)
- Daniels (directors), nickname of American filmmakers Daniel Scheinert and Daniel Kwan

== Places ==
=== United States ===
- Daniels, Maryland, a ghost town
- Daniels, Panola County, Texas, an unincorporated community
- Daniels, Washington County, Texas, an unincorporated community
- Daniels, Wisconsin, a town
- Daniels, West Virginia, a census-designated place
- Daniels County, Montana
- Daniel's Pass, a mountain pass in Utah
- Daniels Run, a small stream in Fairfax, Virginia

=== Canada ===
- Daniel's Cove, Newfoundland and Labrador, a resettled fishing village

=== Antarctica ===
- Daniels Range, the principal mountain range of the Usarp Mountains

== Other uses ==
- Jack Daniel's, Tennessee whiskey distillery and brand
- Daniels (EP), a split EP by Mock Orange and The Band Apart
- Daniels Motorsport, a United Kingdom-based motorsport team
- The John H. Daniels Faculty of Architecture, Landscape and Design at the University of Toronto in Ontario
- USS Josephus Daniels (CG-27), a cruiser
- Daniels School, Milliken, Colorado, United States, a two-room schoolhouse on the National Register of Historic places

== See also ==
- Daniels House (disambiguation), various historic houses in the United States
- Daniells, a surname
