= Lissa =

Lissa may refer to:

== Places ==
- the old Venetian name for the Adriatic island of Vis
- the German name for the town of Leszno in Poland
- the German name for the town of Lysá nad Labem in the Czech Republic
- Kreis Lissa, a Kreis (county) in the southern administrative district of Posen, in the Prussian province of Posen
- Lissa (Lycia), a town of ancient Lycia, now in Turkey

== People ==
- Lissa, a female given name, e.g., a diminutive form from Melissa or Alyssa.
  - Lissa Endriga, American television host and model
  - Lissa Evans
  - Lissa Hunter, American artist
  - Lissa Martinez, American ocean engineer
  - Lissa Muscatine
  - Lissa Rivera, American artist, curator, and filmmaker
  - Lissa Vera, Argentine singer-songwriter, composer and actress
  - Alyssa "Lissa" Daniels of "Lissa Explains it All"
  - Zofia Lissa, Polish musicologist

== Fictional characters ==
- Lissa, a playable character and the younger sister of Chrom from Fire Emblem Awakening.
- Lissa, a main character from the Vampire Academy book series.

== Other ==
- Sony Lissa
- SMS Lissa

== See also ==
- de Lissa
- Lyssa, the spirit of mad rage in Greek mythology
