= William Daniels (disambiguation) =

William Daniels (born 1927) is an American actor.

Billy, Bill, Will or William Daniels may also refer to:

== Artists ==
- William Daniels (painter) (1813–1880), British painter
- William Daniels (artist) (born 1976), British painter

== Performers ==
- Billy Daniels (1915–1988), American singer
- William Randall Daniels (born 1951), American pornographic actor, a/k/a Billy Dee
- William Antonio Daniels (1992–2020), American rapper, a/k/a Kiing Shooter

== Public officials ==
- William B. Daniels (1817–1894), American pioneering settler in Oregon and Idaho Territories
- William Henry Daniels (1855–1897), Hawaiian judge and legislator

== Sportsmen ==
- Will Daniels (born 1986), American basketball player
- Billy Daniels (footballer) (born 1994), English forward and midfielder

== Others ==
- William Daniels (cinematographer) (1901–1970), American Oscar winner for 1948's The Naked City
- William John Daniels (1912–2004), English race car builder, a/k/a Jack Daniels
- Bill Daniels (1920–2000), American cable television executive and sports team owner
- Bill Daniels (historian) (1926–2010), American historian, a/k/a Robert V. Daniels

== See also ==
- William Daniel (disambiguation)
