= Charles Daniels =

Charles Daniels may refer to:

- Charles Daniels (activist) (fl. c. 1914), railway porter
- Charles Daniels (New York politician) (1825–1897), U.S. Representative from New York
- Charles Daniels (swimmer) (1885–1973), American Olympic competitor
- Charles Daniels (tenor) (born 1960), English classical singer
- Charles F. Daniels (1849–1932), American baseball umpire
- Charles N. Daniels (architect) (1828–1892), American architect active in Minnesota
- Charles N. Daniels (music) (1878–1943), composer, occasional lyricist, and music publishing executive
- Charles W. Daniels (1943–2019), Justice of the New Mexico Supreme Court
- Charles Wilberforce Daniels (1862–1927), British physician and pioneer of tropical medicine

== See also ==
- Charlie Daniels (disambiguation)
- Charles Daniel (disambiguation)
