= B. J. Daniels =

B. J. Daniels may refer to:

- B. J. Daniels (writer), American writer
- B. J. Daniels (American football) (born 1989), American football player

== See also ==
- Daniels (surname)
