= George Daniels =

George Daniels may refer to:

- George Daniels (watchmaker) (1926–2011), English horologist
- George B. Daniels (born 1953), United States federal judge
- George Daniels (footballer, born 1912) (1912–1984), English footballer
- George Daniels (footballer, born 1898) (1898–1985), English footballer, played for Altrincham, Bury, Preston North End, Rochdale and Ellesmere Port Town
- George Daniels (cricketer) (1807–1853), English cricketer
- George Daniels (baseball), American baseball player
- George Daniels (sprinter) (1950–2005), Ghanaian sprinter
- George William Daniels (1878–1937), English professor of economics
- George E. Daniels (1875–1954), American automobile industry executive

== See also ==
- George Daniel (disambiguation)
- Daniels (disambiguation)
