= David Daniell =

David Daniell may refer to:

- David Daniell (musician) (born 1972), American guitarist and composer
- David Daniell (cyclist) (born 1989), English competitive cyclist
- David Daniell (author) (1929–2016), biographer of William Tyndale
- David Scott Daniell (1906–1965), English author, historian and journalist

== See also ==
- David Daniels (disambiguation)
