= Charles Daniel =

Charles Daniel may refer to:

- Charles Daniel (sea captain) (died 1661), explorer of Canada
- Charles E. Daniel (1895–1964), United States Army officer
- Charles Daniel (Royal Navy officer) (1894–1981)
- Charles William Daniel (1871–1955), writer and publisher
- Chuck Daniel (1933–2008), American baseball player

== See also ==
- Charles Daniels (disambiguation)
- Charlie Daniels (disambiguation)
