= Senator Daniels =

Senator Daniels may refer to:

- John C. Daniels (1936–2015), Connecticut State Senate
- Julie Daniels (born 1954), Oklahoma State Senate
- Lori Daniels (born 1955), Arizona State Senate
- Milton J. Daniels (1838–1914), Minnesota State Senate
- Scott Daniels (judge) (born 1948), Utah State Senate

== See also ==
- Senator Daniel (disambiguation)
