= George Daniel (disambiguation) =

George Daniel is an English musician.

George Daniel may also refer to:

- George Daniel (lacrosse), Commissioner of the National Lacrosse League
- George M. Daniel (born 1978), fly fisherman
- George Daniel (writer) (1789–1864), English miscellaneous writer and book collector

== See also ==
- George Daniels (disambiguation)
- Daniel George (disambiguation)
