= De Lissa =

de Lissa is a surname literally meaning "of Lissa". Notable people with this surname include:

- Alfred de Lissa (1838–1913), English-born Australian solicitor
- Emile de Lissa (1871–1955), Australian-born rugby union official
- Lillian Daphne de Lissa (1885–1967), early childhood educator in Adelaide, South Australia
- Benjamin Cohen de Lissa, Queensland sugar grower and investor in the failed Port Darwin Sugar Company at Delissaville, Northern Territory
