= Daniel George =

Daniel George may refer to:

- Daniel George (rugby union) (born 1986), Welsh rugby player
- Chief Dan George (1899–1981), chief of the Tsleil-Waututh Nation, author, poet and actor
- Daniel G. George (1840–1916), Union Navy sailor and Medal of Honor recipient

== See also ==
- George Daniel (disambiguation)
- Danielle George
