= Alan Daniels =

Alan Daniels may refer to:

- Alan Daniels (EastEnders), a fictional character
- Alan F. Daniels (born 1968), American real estate business executive
- Alan Daniels (basketball), in the 2010 NBA Development League draft
