= Daniel House =

Daniel House may refer to:

- Daniel House (musician) (born 1961), American musician and entrepreneur
- Daniel House (Knoxville, Tennessee), historic U.S. home

== See also ==
- Danuel House Jr. (born 1993), American basketball player
- Danielle House (born 1976), Canadian beauty pageant winner
- Daniels House (disambiguation)
- Danny House, Grade I listed building in West Sussex, England
