= Ronald Daniel =

Ronald Daniel may refer to:

- Ron Daniel (1930– 2023), American engineer and management consultant
- Ronald L. Daniel (born 1948/1949), American commissioner of the Baltimore Police Department in 2000
- Ron Daniel (racewalker), American winner of the 2 miles walk at the 1975 USA Indoor Track and Field Championships

== See also ==
- Ronald Daniels (disambiguation)
