= Senator O'Daniel =

Senator O'Daniel may refer to:

- Ed O'Daniel (born 1938), Kentucky State Senate
- William L. O'Daniel )1923-2017), Illinois State Senate
- W. Lee O'Daniel (1890–1969), Texas United States Senate

== See also ==
- Senator Daniel (disambiguation)
