= Daniells =

Daniells is a surname. Notable people with the surname include:

- A. G. Daniells (1858–1935), American Seventh-day Adventist minister and administrator
- Roy Daniells (1902–1979), Canadian poetry professor

== See also ==
- Danielle
- Daniels (disambiguation)
