= Daniels House =

Daniels House may refer to the following houses in the United States:

- Daniels House (Bentonville, Arkansas)
- Charles Daniels House, Chester, Connecticut
- O. J. Daniels House, Jerome, Idaho
- Southwick-Daniels Farm, Blackstone, Massachusetts
- Blake Daniels Cottage, Stoneham, Massachusetts
- Frederick Daniels House, Worcester, Massachusetts
- Mansfield A. Daniels House, Scobey, Montana
- John T. Daniels House, Manteo, North Carolina
- Josephus Daniels House, Raleigh, North Carolina
- Rogers-Bagley-Daniels-Pegues House, Raleigh, North Carolina
- E. J. and Alice Daniels House, Sioux Falls, listed on the NRHP in South Dakota
- Daniels Farm House, Rio Grande Village, Texas
- Pratt-McDaniels-LaFlamme House, Bennington, Vermont
- Capts. Louis and Philomene Daniels House, Vergennes, Vermont

== See also ==
- Daniel House (disambiguation)
