= Jeffrey Daniels =

Jeffrey Daniels may refer to:

- Jeffrey Daniels (architect) (born 1953), American architect
- Jeffrey Daniels (author), author and professor
- Jeff Daniels (born 1955), American actor
- Jeff Daniels (director) (born 1978), American/Australian documentary film-maker
- Jeff Daniels (ice hockey) (born 1968), retired professional ice hockey player
- Jeff Daniels, pseudonym used by country singer Luke McDaniel (1927–1992)

== See also ==
- Jeffrey Daniel (MP) (1626–1681), English politician
- Jeffrey Daniel (often misspelled as Jeffrey Daniels), American dancer, singer-songwriter and choreographer
