= David Daniels =

David Daniels may refer to:

- David Daniels (American football) (born 1969), wide receiver for the Seattle Seahawks
- David Daniels (basketball) (born 1971), Canadian basketball player
- David Daniels (conductor) (1933–2020), American conductor
- David Daniels (countertenor) (born 1966), American opera singer and countertenor
- David Daniels (cricketer) (born 1942), former English cricketer
- David Daniels (filmmaker), American commercial director and filmmaker
- David Daniels (poet) (1933–2008), visual poet
- David Karsten Daniels (born 1979), American songwriter and musician
- David T. Daniels (born 1957), Republican member of the Ohio Senate

== See also ==
- David Daniell (disambiguation)
