= Mike Daniels =

Mike Daniels may refer to:

- Mike Daniels (musician) (1928–2016), British dixieland revivalist jazz trumpeter and bandleader
- Mike Daniels (American football) (born 1989), American football defensive end
- Mike Daniels (rugby union) (born 1992), English rugby union player

== See also ==
- Michael Daniels (born 1950), British transpersonal psychologist and parapsychologist
