= Andrew Davidson (physician) =

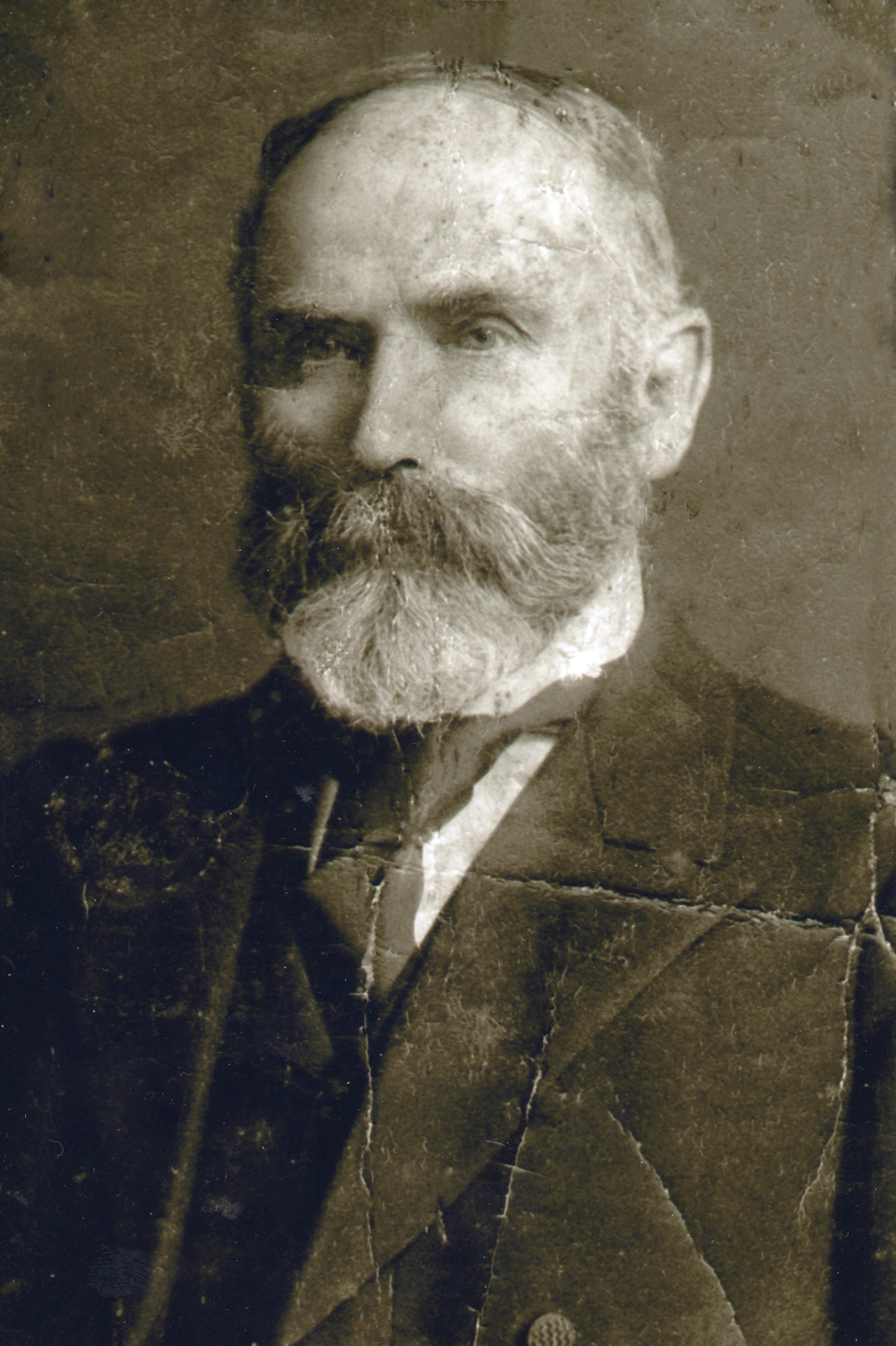
Dr Andrew Davidson c. 1899

Andrew Davidson, MD FRCPEd, (1836 – 1918) was a Scottish physician who worked as a medical missionary, tropical disease researcher and medical facility administrator in Madagascar and Mauritius. He was an early advocate for the teaching of tropical medicine in British medical schools, and was the author of many publications, mostly related to aspects of tropical medicine.

== Early life ==
Born in Kinneff, Scotland, on 22 August 1836, Andrew Davidson was the son of a shoemaker, John Davidson, and his wife, Margaret Cobban. As a teenager, he worked as an assistant bookseller in Montrose, but later studied medicine at Edinburgh University. He lived in the nearby home of the medical missionary, William Burns Thomson, who had just established a busy dispensary where he and other students helped out when their study commitments allowed. Soon after graduating, Davidson was married in Edinburgh in March 1862 to Christina McDonald, the daughter of a merchant from Laurencekirk, David McDonald.

== Life in Madagascar ==
Less than a month after being married, Davidson and his wife became members of the first team from the London Missionary Society being sent to Madagascar. Europeans were expelled from the island almost three decades earlier. A new king, Radama II, had invited missionaries to return, but when Davidson arrived in the capital, Antananarivo, the majority of Madagascar's people had no previous exposure to European medicine or its principles. One of Davidson's colleagues would later recall that he made an instant impression with a successful cataract operation by restoring sight to a woman who had “long been blind”. Locals believing he could work miracles turned up a few days later outside his home with a corpse, hoping he could bring a deceased person back to life, but then realised his limitations.

Davidson was soon running a busy clinic in Antananarivo, opening a dispensary for two hours every day then visiting the sick in their homes. In a letter to William Burns Thomson, he said that although French doctors had tried to introduce themselves to the King, he'd been appointed Court Physician, and been given the Order of Radama “for my successful treatment of his son”. By early 1864, Davidson had received royal permission to begin building Madagascar's first hospital, not far from his home in the capital. After a trip back to Britain at end of 1866, Davidson cut his ties with the LMS but with more funding provided through Thomson he returned to Madagascar and began an intensive campaign of educating local medical missionary students in the use of chemical equipment and prepared medical texts in Malagasy, including works on pharmacy, chemistry and midwifery.

Both Davidson and Thomson saw the training of medical students as an extension of their missionary work, and their plans were advanced when Queen Ranavalona II became monarch of Madagascar in 1868. According to Thomson, Davidson helped to encourage the Queen and thousands of her people to convert to Christianity. She gave Davidson permission to open the Malagasy Medical Mission College, where he taught physiology, while others taught anatomy, English, chemistry, “natural philosophy”, algebra and geometry and “Bible knowledge”. Three of Davidson's students were brought to Edinburgh by Thomson. One died before passing his preliminary examination, but the other two went home as the first Madagascan medical practitioners with internationally recognised qualifications. With the help of a nurse sent from Scotland by Thomson, by 1874 Davidson had also trained two batches of women as “missionary nurses” or midwives. “I know of no mission that has exerted so great an influence on the destinies of a nation as the Medical Mission, under Dr Davidson, in Madagascar,” Thomson later reflected.

As well as practising medicine and teaching in Madagascar, Davidson would also devote time to writing scholarly articles. One related to an outbreak of “choreomania” or a “dancing disease” which swept through Madagascar in 1863, affecting large numbers of people and causing widespread turmoil. In 1864, he wrote “Tubercular leprosy in Madagascar” for the Edinburgh Medical Journal. In 1867, he wrote an article on a recently abolished Madagascan practice of “trial by poisoning”.

Davidson's time in Madagascar would come to an end in 1876 after a dispute with the Prime Minister, Rainilaiarivony. According to fellow British missionary, John Alden Houlder, the dispute apparently began because Rainilaiarivony “felt aggrieved because of some real or fancied neglect of the Queen or himself”. The already “thoroughly angry” Prime Minister and his friends then became “furious” when Davidson backed moves to make wealthy families pay something for previously free medical services. Rainilaiarivony called a mass meeting, told the thousands of people who attended to boycott Davidson, took away his students and assistants, and placed spies around his house, making it “positively dangerous” for any local or foreigner to go near him. “It was, however, all to no purpose,” Houlder recorded. “The doctor never budged an inch, nor showed the slightest sign of bowing down to the great man.” Nevertheless, the “persecution” did eventually become unbearable and Davidson left Madagascar after securing employment in the nearby British colony of Mauritius.

== Life in Mauritius ==
Over the next few years, Davidson's positions in the Mauritian Civil Medical Service would include Visiting and Superintending Surgeon of the Civil Hospital, and Superintendent of the Lunatic Asylum. He would assist inquiries and then publish reports on leprosy, malaria, “acute anaemic dropsy”, epizootic diseases, and public sanitation. As well, he would prepare a synopsis of reports and papers from Mauritius for the International Colonial Exhibition in Amsterdam in 1883, and he would become a professor of chemistry at one of the island's leading schools, Royal College.

== As an author, editor, and lecturer ==
When he returned to Britain with Christina in about 1892, Davidson produced his first major work: Geographical pathology: an inquiry into the geographical distribution of infective and climatic diseases, covering Europe and large parts of Asia. In 1893, he produced another major text: Hygiene and diseases of warm climates. Davidson edited the book and was the sole author of two chapters on two little-understood diseases that were claiming thousands of lives each year in the tropics, malaria and dengue fever. However, most chapters were contributed by other senior medical figures in Europe, Africa and the USA. A review in the British Medical Journal criticised aspects of the book, but said it was still the best work on the subject so far published in any language, and should be “the daily companion of every medical man in warm countries”.

One of Davidson's main collaborators on the book, and the author of several chapters, was fellow Scot, Patrick Manson (1844–1922), who had recently returned to Britain after working in China and the British colony of Hong Kong for more than 20 years. For the next few years the professional paths of the pair would overlap as they both sought to lift the profile of tropical medicine in Britain. In an address in 1897, Manson told his audience he was in part drawing on notes provided by Davidson, who he described as having judgement and knowledge that matched “very great” experience in tropical medicine. He quoted Davidson as having said that every British medical school should have “lectures on the hygiene and diseases of warm climates”, and that appointments of government medical officers in tropical and sub-tropical colonies should be restricted to those with a certificate of qualification in tropical medicine. “I have called in a specialist of experience to prescribe,” Manson said, in relating the quotes. “I need hardly say I fully endorse his prescription.”

When the British Medical Association formed a new sub-section devoted to tropical medicine the following year, Manson was made the president and Davidson was one of three vice-presidents. At a meeting of the sub-section in July 1898, both men presented papers on malaria. Then Manson would bring out his own text book, Tropical Diseases: A Manual of the Diseases of Warm Climates, which he stated was not being put forward as a “complete treatise” or comparable to “the more elaborate works” of Davidson and others. Nevertheless, Manson used his book to outline his theory – later proven to be correct - that malaria in humans was transmitted by mosquitoes. The following year, Manson became the founder of the London School of Hygiene and Tropical Medicine. A few months later, in May 1900, Davidson became Edinburgh University's first lecturer in “diseases of tropical climates”. He remained at the university until his retirement in 1907, teaching students from Britain and across the world, including Africa, Asia and Australasia.

== Death and family ==
On 13 January 1918, Andrew Davidson died at the home in Ilkley, Yorkshire of his daughter Flora (1867–1950), 16 days after the death there of Christina, his wife of 56 years. Andrew and Christina were survived by two sons and three daughters. They included John Stewart Davidson (1863–1945), who had joined the Army Medical Corps in 1886, and David Macdonald Davidson (1865–1927), who had joined the Indian Medical Service in 1888. He would be Surgeon-General in the IMS when he co-authored a chapter on dysentery in their father's 1893 tropical diseases book.

One of the two children who predeceased Andrew and Christina was Mary Cameron Davidson (1871–1905), would become a trained nurse before joining the Indian Medical Service. She and her two sons drowned in the SS Hilda steamship disaster off the coast of France in 1905. The son who Andrew and Christina named after his great friend and mentor, William Burns Thomson Davidson (1864–1914), predeceased them in Ceylon (now Sri Lanka), where he had gone to live as a tea planter. Before their deaths in 1918, however, Andrew and Christina would learn that William's eldest daughter, Alice Muriel Davidson (1900–1988), had begun working in a Ceylon hospital as a nurse.

== Legacy ==
Although Patrick Manson may have been generous in his praise of Davidson, as the brightness of the former's career grew following the far-reaching consequences of his discoveries in parasitology, the latter's achievements would be overshadowed. It was Manson who would end up being widely hailed as the “father of tropical medicine”. Nevertheless, at an event to mark the 50th anniversary of the Scottish branch of the Royal Society of Tropical Medicine and Hygiene in 1980, Davidson was named as one of 33 Scots born between 1721 and 1869 who had made significant contributions to tropical medicine. Particular mention was made of his role in establishing the school of tropical medicine at Edinburgh University. In Madagascar, the school of medicine that Davidson founded in about 1870 was still operating at least as late as the 1890s. Davidson's contributions to public health and tropical medicine were also remembered decades after he had departed Mauritius. In a report in 1921, he was described as a “distinguished medical officer” who had conducted valuable research into sanitation and disease outbreaks on the island.
