= Scott Daniels =

Scott Daniels may refer to:

- Scott Daniels (ice hockey) (born 1969), retired Canadian ice hockey left winger
- Scott Daniels (judge) (born 1948), attorney, politician and judge in Utah
- Scott Daniels (footballer) (born 1969), former footballer
