= Senator Daniel =

Senator Daniel may refer to:

== Members of the United States Senate ==
- Charles E. Daniel (1895–1964), U.S. Senator from South Carolina
- John W. Daniel (1842–1910), U.S. Senator from Virginia
- Price Daniel (1910–1988), U.S. Senator from Texas

== United States state senate members ==
- C. Welborn Daniel (1926–2016), Florida State Senate
- Robert Williams Daniel (1884–1940), Virginia State Senate
- Warren Daniel (born 1968), North Carolina State Senate
- William Daniel (Maryland politician) (1826–1897), Maryland State Senate
- Allen Daniel Jr. (1772–1836), Georgia State Senate
- Warren F. Daniell (1826–1913), New Hampshire State Senate

== See also ==
- Senator Daniels (disambiguation)
- Senator O'Daniel (disambiguation)
