= Joe Daniels =

Joe Daniels may refer to:

== People ==
- Joe Daniels (drummer) (born 1970), rock drummer
- Joe Daniels (jazz drummer) (1908–1993), jazz musician from South Africa
- Josephus Daniels (1862–1948), U.S. Secretary of the Navy

== Other ==
- Joe Daniels (horse), a Thoroughbred racehorse who the 1872 Belmont Stakes

== See also ==
- Joseph J. Daniel, North Carolina jurist
