= Alan F. Daniels =

American real estate business executive

- Born: Alan Fitzgerald Daniels; May 28, 1968 (age 58); Miami, Florida, USA
- Occupations: Chairman & CEO of Real Estate Capital Management (RECM) (2002–present)
- Height: 6 ft 4 in (1.93 m)

Alan Fitzgerald Daniels (born May 28, 1968) is an American real estate business executive. He is the chairman and chief executive officer of Real Estate Capital Management, Intl. Ltd, a global business-to-business provider of real estate financial services.

== Career ==
Daniels previously served as chairman/CEO of venture capital and investment firm, Real Estate Industries from 2000 to 2002.

He also served as chairman/CEO RealEstate.com from 1997 to 2000 where he's credited for leading the company from start-up stage to an international business-to-business provider of Web-Based Solutions, with a private valuation in excess of $500M. Daniels raised nearly $100M in venture capital while at the helm of RealEstate.com. Venture investor's included: Paul Allen’s Vulcan Inc., J. & W. Seligman & Co., and Fleet Boston, Robertson Stephens. As chairman of the board of RealEstate.com, Daniels assembled a board of directors that included: Steve J. Heyer, former President/COO of Turner Broadcasting System, R. Byron Carlock, former Chief Investment Officer of Post Properties and former Atlanta Mayor, the late Maynard H. Jackson.

While chairman/CEO of RealEstate.com, Daniels spearheaded long-term multi-million dollar revenue agreements with firms such as GMAC, Lycos and Realtor.com. As a result of the rapid revenue growth and business expansion, RealEstate.com was scheduled for an initial public offering (IPO) in Q1 of 2000. Investment banks advising the company included: Goldman Sachs, J.P. Morgan, Fleet Boston, Robertson Stephens and A.G. Edwards. Due to the Internet bubble, the firm did not IPO as planned and the company’s valuation declined. Daniels lost an estimated $220M of his net worth within a few months.

In December 2000, the firm’s assets were acquired by existing investor Sand Hill Capital. Daniels and other key executives resigned after disagreeing with Sand Hill plans for the future direction of the firm. Sand Hill changed the firm’s business-to-business model to a consumer-to-business residential website and subsequently sold the firm to Barry Diller’s InterActiveCorp (IAC).

== Life ==
Daniels was born in Miami, Florida in 1968. His mother, Peggy Lee, was an oncology nurse at Cedars Hospital in Miami. In the fall of 1986, Daniels attended Florida A&M University studying political science and business economics. In 1987, he enrolled in the Army ROTC and Army National Guard while attending Florida A&M. Daniels relocated to Atlanta, Ga. in 1990 to be with his mother after learning she had been diagnosed with breast cancer. Peggy Lee, Daniels’ mother, died of cancer in June 1993, one week after Daniels’ 25th birthday.

In 1994, Daniels graduated from the Georgia Institute of Real Estate and began his real estate career as a Commercial Real Estate Broker with RE/MAX & CB Commercial JV.

Daniels married his first wife Natalie Jackson in 1993 after dating for 7 years. Jackson is now an attorney in South Florida.

Daniels was engaged to New York based model Jaime Marie from 2001 to early 2005. The couple relocated to Los Angeles in 2002.

In May 2005, Daniels began dating former model Nicole Murphy. Daniels received unwanted publicity for his relationship with Murphy, at the time wife of actor Eddie Murphy. Murphy and Daniels were introduced by mutual friend Stacie J., formerly of The Apprentice. Nicole Murphy filed for divorce Aug 7, 2005. After constant irritations, media exposure and threats from Eddie Murphy, Daniels and Nicole Murphy mutually agreed to end their relationship in the summer of 2006.

== Industry expertise ==
Daniels' knowledge and expertise in global real estate markets range from conventional financing to structured finance. Daniels has been noted in books by Author Quincy Benton as an industry expert. He's served as an advisor to Chinese Government Elected Officials on the China SEACOT project in the Pudong region of Shanghai. He's been a speaker at investment conferences for firms such as Goldman Sachs and Robertson Stephens. He's been an honored guest presenter at the Teleperformance Annual Investor Conference at the Louvre in Paris, France. Daniels has also been quoted or featured: Fox News with Neil Cavuto, Tavis Smiley Show, CNBC, ABC, Kiplinger, The Wall Street Journal, U.S. News & World Report, Ebony Magazine and Chief Executive Magazine. Daniels is also referenced on the list of "American Real Estate Businesspeople" along with other notable industry professionals.

== Awards and recognitions ==
Daniels is a recipient of the Ernst & Young Award for Business Leadership and was a Finalist for the 2000 Ernst & Young Entrepreneur of the Year Award. He was recognized as an “Ambassador of Goodwill” by the former Secretary of State of Georgia, Cathy Cox. Daniels was also recognized by Dr. Dennis Kimbro as “An Entrepreneur That Will Make a Difference in the New Millennium.”

== Hobbies and interests ==
Daniels’ interests include: philanthropy, skydiving, tennis and basketball. Daniels is also a student of world religions and is actively committed to mentoring underprivileged youth.
