= Brian Daniels =

Brian Daniels may refer to:

- Brian Daniels (American football) (born 1984), American football guard
- Brian "Mitts" Daniels (born 1971), American musician, songwriter, and producer
- Brian Daniels (politician) (born 1958), Minnesota politician
