= Douglas Henry Daniels =

American historian

Academic background
- Education: University of Chicago (BA); University of California, Berkeley (MA, PhD)

Academic work
- Discipline: History
- Sub-discipline: U.S. history, African history, history of jazz
- Institutions: University of California, Santa Barbara
- Notable works: Pioneer Urbanites (1980); Lester Leaps In (2002)

Douglas Henry Daniels is an American historian of African American social and cultural history, Black communities in the American West, and the early history of jazz and blues. He is professor emeritus of Black Studies and History at the University of California, Santa Barbara.

His first book, Pioneer Urbanites (1980), argued that Black San Franciscans formed a dispersed and cosmopolitan community long before the ghettos of the mid-twentieth century. He later turned to jazz, publishing Lester Leaps In (2002), a biography of the saxophonist Lester Young, and One O'Clock Jump (2006), a history of the Oklahoma City Blue Devils.

== Education and career ==
Daniels received a Bachelor of Arts in political science at the University of Chicago, and then a Master of Arts and, a doctorate in history at the University of California, Berkeley.

He joined the faculty at the University of California, Santa Barbara, where he held a joint appointment in Black Studies and History. He chaired both the Black Studies and the Asian American Studies departments, before retiring as professor emeritus.

Daniels has received two Fulbright fellowships. The first under the African Regional Research Program, in Kenya and Tanzania, and the second in Japan, where he taught African American history and the history of jazz and researched the history of jazz in Japan.

== Research and writing ==
=== Pioneer Urbanites ===
Daniels's first book was titled Pioneer Urbanites: A Social and Cultural History of Black San Francisco. It was printed by Temple University Press in 1980 and then reissued by the University of California Press in 1991 with a foreword by Nathan Huggins. The book was organized by theme rather than chronology, and followed the Black community of the San Francisco Bay Area from the Gold Rush to the wartime migration of the 1940s. It was based on interviews with residents born between 1884 and 1912 and on photographic portraits. In the book, Daniels argued that scholarly attention to the Great Migration and the modern ghetto had obscured an earlier pioneer period, which lasted in San Francisco until about 1940. During this period, Black residents lived dispersed across the city rather than in a ghetto. He coined the term "travelcraft" for the outlook and skills that made such mobility possible.

Reviewers welcomed the book while noting limits. Vincent P. Franklin, in The Journal of American History, wrote that it moved the study of Black urban life beyond the ghetto. However, he added that the book said more about the city's cultivated residents than about the East Bay. Robert W. Cherny called it an important new perspective in the Pacific Historical Review, however, he thought that Daniels overstated the influence of the early unions. William Simons judged the book to be significant and seminal in Arizona and the West, and Neil Larry Shumsky wrote in the Journal of Urban History that Daniels tied Black history to urban history in a way which had been rarely attempted. James S. Olson, in the Journal of the West, thought it a worthy contribution that dealt inadequately with Black religion and folk culture.

=== Lester Leaps In ===
Lester Leaps In: The Life and Times of Lester "Pres" Young was published in 2002 after more than two decades of research. Booklist described it as the first full-scale biography of the saxophonist, however, earlier overviews were published by Lewis Porter and Frank Büchmann-Møller. Critics had cast Young as a musician destroyed by drink and drugs, but Daniels argued that the reading reflected the racial climate in which Young worked. He also argued that Young's playing developed rather than declined after his wartime army service.

Kathy Ogren wrote in The Journal of American History that few biographies of major musicians matched its sensitivity. She also added that it amounted to a definitive account of Young's life and artistry. Publishers Weekly called it the most thorough treatment of Young then available. A JazzTimes reviewer described it as among the more unusual jazz biographies because it was written by a social historian rather than a musicologist. Reservations came from William G. Kenz in Library Journal, who noted that Daniels sometimes asserted Young's thoughts on slender evidence. While Bill Ott in Booklist thought the scholarship was blunted by a dry academic style.

=== One O'Clock Jump ===
One O'Clock Jump: The Unforgettable History of the Oklahoma City Blue Devils was published by Beacon Press in 2006. Daniels came upon the Oklahoma City Blue Devils while researching the Young biography. He became absorbed by them, both as a band and as an instance of a community that produced major jazz musicians. The band toured from 1923 to 1933 and had Walter Page, Henry "Buster" Smith, Jimmy Rushing, Oran "Hot Lips" Page, Lester Young and Count Basie among its members. Daniels interviewed former members and their families during the 1990s, placing the band within the social history of Black Oklahoma City.

Harold V. Cordry wrote in Library Journal that the book filled a distinct gap in jazz scholarship. He praised Daniels for seeking out surviving members even before the project was commissioned. Publishers Weekly called it an important chronicle in American music history. The book was a finalist for best research in recorded jazz in the 2007 ARSC Awards for Excellence in Historical Recorded Sound Research. Bil Banks, in The Journal of African American History, credited Daniels with the reminder that 1920s jazz extended beyond the celebrated bands. However, Banks was not convinced the band ranked as highly as those of Basie and Moten. Lin Rolens, reviewing it in the Santa Barbara News-Press, called the research excellent but thought the music itself largely absent from the account.

=== Other work ===
Daniels contributed to the Timeline of African American Music, which was a project led by Portia Maultsby with Carnegie Hall. Being one of the nine contributors of introductory essays; he wrote three essays on jazz. He argued that conventional histories treat the music's development as a straight line but that its evolution is also circular.

Daniels edited Peoples of Color in the American West (1994) with Sucheng Chan, Mario T. García and Terry P. Wilson. The book gathers excerpts on Native Americans, Mexican Americans, African Americans and Asian Americans; and treated them as agents rather than objects of the region's history. Reviewing it in California History, Nadine Ishitani Hata called it a useful classroom tool and a timely corrective to monocultural accounts of the West. However, she found the book's study questions pedantic.

== Selected publications ==
- Daniels, Douglas Henry (1980). Pioneer Urbanites: A Social and Cultural History of Black San Francisco. Philadelphia: Temple University Press. Reissued Berkeley: University of California Press, 1991.
- Chan, Sucheng; Daniels, Douglas Henry; García, Mario T.; Wilson, Terry P., eds. (1994). Peoples of Color in the American West. Lexington, MA: D. C. Heath.
- Daniels, Douglas Henry (2002). Lester Leaps In: The Life and Times of Lester "Pres" Young. Boston: Beacon Press. ISBN 0-8070-7102-1.
- Daniels, Douglas Henry (2006). One O'Clock Jump: The Unforgettable History of the Oklahoma City Blue Devils. Boston: Beacon Press. ISBN 0-8070-7136-6.
