= Lisa Daniels =

Lisa Daniels may refer to:

- Lisa Daniels (actress) (1930–2010), British actress
- Lisa Daniels (synchronised swimmer) (born 1985), New Zealand synchronised swimmer
- Lisa Daniëls (dancer) (born 2011), Belgian dancer
