= Daniels (given name) =

Daniels is a masculine given name which is borne by:

- Daniels Bērziņš (born 1999), Latvian ice hockey player
- Daniels Ontužāns (born 2000), Latvian footballer
- Daniels Pavļuts (born 1976), Latvian politician, former Minister for Health and former Minister for Economics
