= Patricia Daniels =

American engineering educator

Patricia D. Daniels is an American engineering educator known for her work on educational accreditation. She is a professor emerita of electrical and computer engineering at Seattle University, and an affiliate professor of electrical and computer engineering at the University of Washington.

== Education and career ==
Daniels is a graduate of the University of California, Berkeley, majoring in electrical engineering and computer science, and she also earned her PhD from UC Berkeley.

At Seattle University, she chaired the department of electrical and computer engineering, and became associate dean of science and engineering. She has also worked in industry, for The Aerospace Corporation, the Aerospace Electrical Division of the Westinghouse Electric Corporation, and Boeing, and as a program director for undergraduate education at the National Science Foundation.

She has served as chair of the Electrical and Computer Engineering Division of the American Society for Engineering Education, and chaired the Engineering Accreditation Commission of ABET for 2003–2004.

== Recognition ==
Daniels won the IEEE Education Society Edwin C. Jones Meritorious Service Award in 1994, the IEEE Education Society Harriet B. Rigas Award for "significant contributions to electrical and computer engineering education" in 1997, and the ECE Division Distinguished Educator Award of the American Society for Engineering Education in 2012.

She was named a Fellow of the IEEE in 1997, "for contributions to engineering education", and was named a fellow of ABET in 2006.
