= Jeffrey Daniels (architect) =

American architect

- Born: New York, New York
- Education: Princeton University, Massachusetts Institute of Technology
- Occupation: Architect
- Awards: AIA Los Angeles Chapter Honorable Mention Award, Project New Hope Apartments
- Practice: Jeffrey Daniels Architects
- Buildings: KFC Building, Western Avenue, Los Angeles
- Website: http://danielsarchitects.com

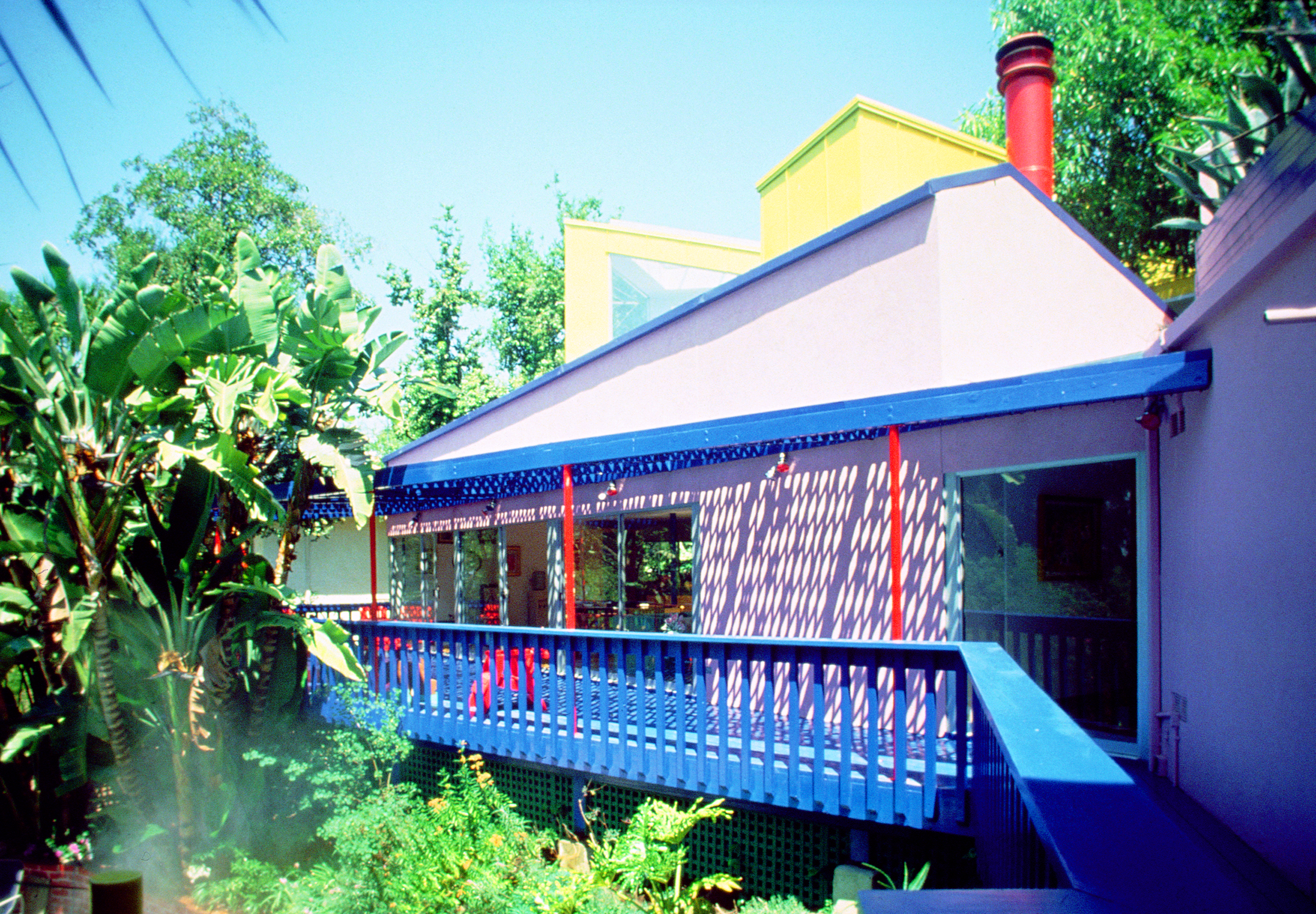
DAVID HOCKNEY RESIDENCE

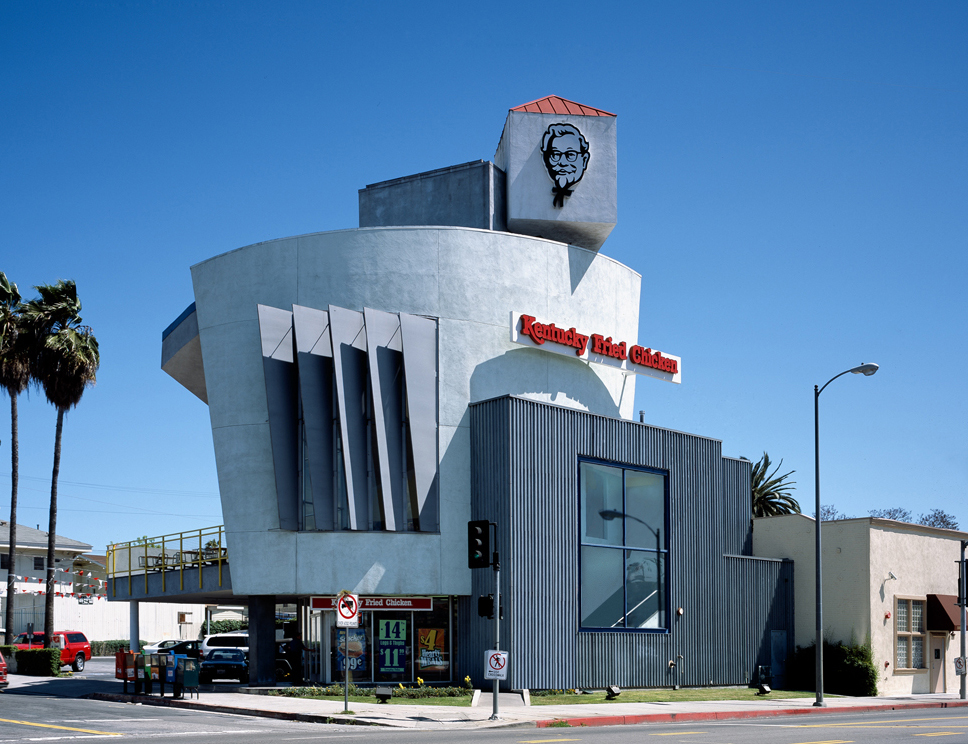
KFC on Western Ave.

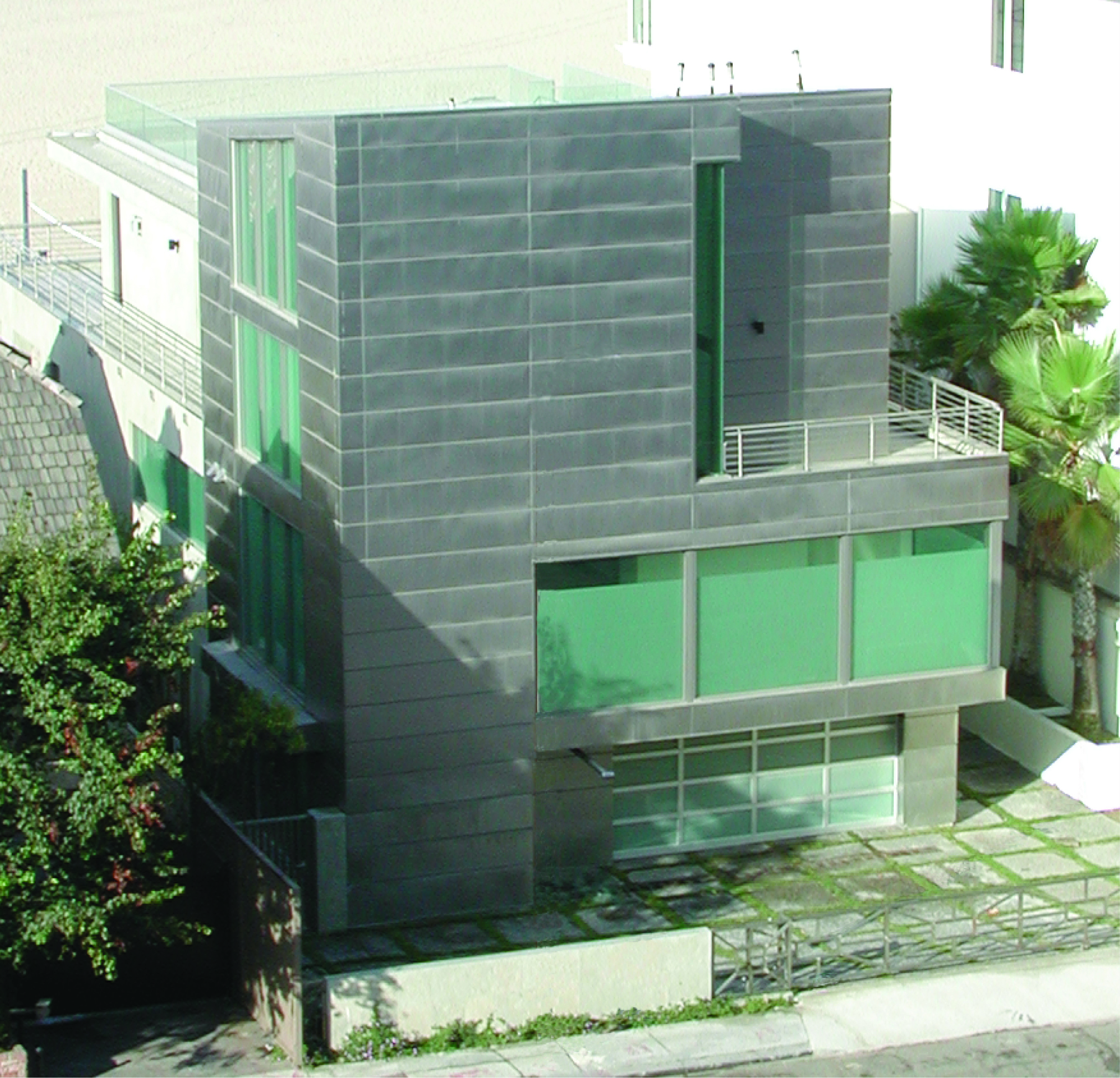
TITANIUM HOUSE Santa Monica Jeffrey Daniels Architects

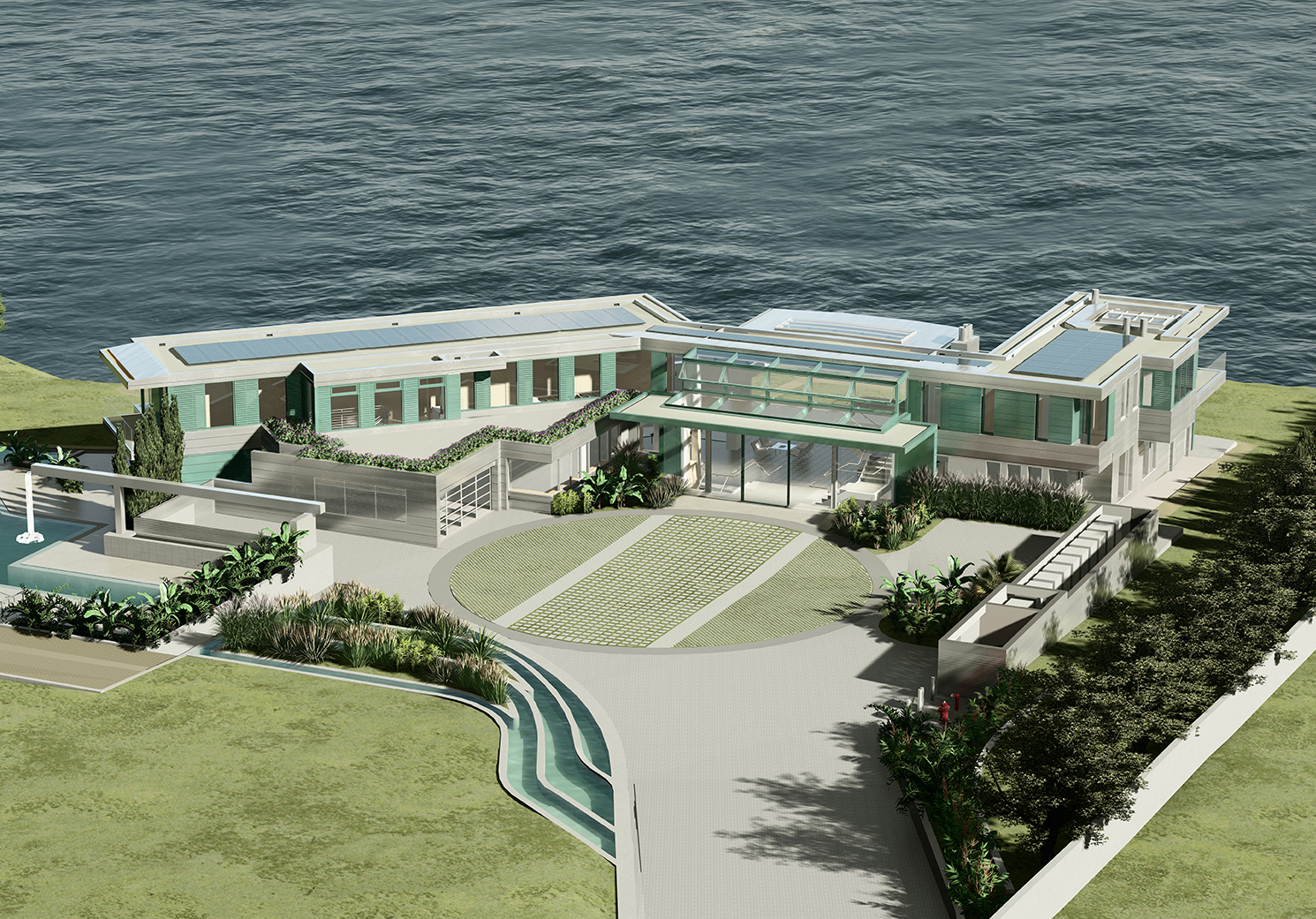
PCH 01 JEFFREY DANIELS ARCHITECTS

Jeffrey Daniels is an American architect. Based in Los Angeles, Daniels is known for his iconic buildings, such as the award-winning KFC building on Western Avenue in Los Angeles. Other notable works include the David Hockney Residence in the Hollywood Hills, the Lookout Mountain Residence in Laurel Canyon and the Edythe and Eli Broad Studios at the California Institute of the Arts. Daniels was part of the early wave of young architects to apprentice in the office of Frank Gehry.

Daniels began studying architecture as an undergraduate at Princeton University and went on to get his Master's degree from the Massachusetts Institute of Technology. He first worked in the Taller de Arquitectura founded by Ricardo Bofill in Barcelona, Spain. He then came to Los Angeles where he worked for Gehry on such projects as the Loyola Law School near downtown Los Angeles. In 1981, he founded Grinstein/Daniels Architects with Elyse Grinstein. Daniels served as the firm's principal in charge of design and went on to create many of the firm's signature works. In 1992 Daniels formed Jeffrey Daniels Architects. His KFC building was part of the museum exhibition entitled “Overdrive: LA Constructs the Future,” which opened at the Getty Museum in April, 2013 and at the National Building Museum in Washington D.C. in October, 2013. In 2016 Daniels was elevated to Fellowship in the American Institute of Architects.

In 2025, the City of Beverly Hills appointed Daniels to Architectural and Design Review Commission.
