= G. Lester Daniels =

American politician (died 1969)

Member of the Delaware House of Representatives

Personal details
- Died: July 25, 1969 Middletown, Delaware, U.S.
- Resting place: Townsend Cemetery
- Party: Democratic
- Spouse: Ruth E.
- Occupation: Politician; undertaker

G. Lester Daniels (died July 25, 1969) was an American politician from Delaware. He served as a member of the Delaware House of Representatives.

== Early life ==
G. Lester Daniels was born to George W. Daniels.

== Career ==
Daniels was a Democrat. He was elected to the Delaware House of Representatives in 1936. He served on the board of commissioners for the Levy Court for six years. In his last two years, he was president of the board. He was chairman of the New Castle County Democratic Committee, the St. Georges Hundred committee and the Middletown Planning Commission. He was general manager of the Delaware Memorial Bridge.

Daniels worked as an undertaker in Middletown and Townsend for 44 years. He retired in 1966. He served as president and secretary of the Delaware State Funeral Directors Association.

Daniels was a founder of the Townsend Fire Department and served as its first president for 25 years. He served on the advisory board of the Townsend branch of the Wilmington Trust Company, director of the Odessa Building and Loan Association, and treasurer of the Townsend Building and Location Association. He also served as secretary and treasurer of Townsend Cemetery for 35 years.

== Personal life ==
Daniels married Ruth E. Hutchinson, daughter of Delaware politician Joseph C. Hutchinson. They raised his nephew, Robert C. Hutchinson. He lived at 212 North Broad Street in Middletown. He was a member of the Immanuel United Methodist Church in Townsend.

Daniels died on July 25, 1969, aged 68, at his home in Middletown. He was buried in Townsend Cemetery.
