= Daniels, Washington County, Texas =

Daniels
- Unincorporated community
- Interactive map of Daniels
- Location within Texas Daniels (the United States)
- Coordinates: 30°11′56″N 96°12′21″W
- Country: United States
- State: Texas
- County: Washington County

Daniels is an unincorporated agricultural community located near the intersection of Farm roads 1155 and 2447 in Washington County, Texas, United States. It was developed in the 1960s.
