= Raymond Daniels =

Raymond Daniels may refer to:

- Raymond Daniels (Gaelic footballer) (1979–2008), Gaelic footballer from County Wicklow
- Raymond Daniels (martial artist) (born 1980), African-American karateka and kickboxer
