= Peter Daniels =

Peter Daniels may refer to:

- Peter T. Daniels (born 1951), scholar of writing systems
- Peter Daniels (racing driver) (born 1958), NASCAR Weekly Series national champion in 2002
- pseudonym of Fred Olen Ray (born 1954), American film director
