= Daniels Run =

River in Virginia, United States

Coordinates: 38°51′1.98″N 77°17′53.36″W

Location
- Country: United States
- Location: Fairfax, Virginia

Physical characteristics
- Mouth
  - location: Accotink Creek

Daniels Run is a small stream in the City of Fairfax, Virginia. Daniels Run is a tributary of Accotink Creek and joins it south of Fairfax Circle, the intersection of Lee Highway (U.S. Route 29) and Arlington Boulevard (U.S. Route 50). It is fed by numerous springs around Fairfax's Greenway Hills neighborhood.

The stream runs behind Daniels Run Elementary School, and the city, school and others have partnered to restore and buffer the stream.
