= Sony Lissa =

Range of HiFi components by Sony

Lissa was a range of HiFi components by Sony, based on the i.LINK S200 interconnect standard and styled in a novel, minimalist design. It was introduced in 2000. Produced as a single series with a unique design.

Although the receiver had some analogue inputs, the components required just a digital i.LINK connection to hook up. The other components only featured a power cord and two i.LINK ports on the rear panel.

The MiniDisc recorder/player & CD player implement the 1394TA specifications:

- AV/C Disc Subunit General Specification
- AV/C Disc Media Type Specification - MD audio
- AV/C Disc Media Type Specification - CD-DA
- AV/C Descriptor Mechanism Specification
- AV/C Information Block Types Specification

These devices can be controlled by either the STR-LSA1 receiver, or through a computer (Windows or Mac) using standard AV/C commands. The MiniDisc deck appears to be the most complete implementation of the Disc Subunit specification in consumer equipment.

== Products ==
Only four components and one set of speakers were ever introduced:

- CDP-LSA1 – CD player
- SDP-LSA10 - DVD / SACD player
- MDS-LSA1 – MiniDisc recorder
- STR-LSA1 – Receiver
- SS-LA500ED – Speakers

for the latest, the speakers were a 2.1 system
