= Ronald Daniels =

Ronald or Ron Daniels may refer to:

- Ron Daniels (academic), president of the Johns Hopkins University
- Ronald Daniels (politician), former U.S. presidential candidate
- Ron Daniels (director), theatre and opera director

== See also ==
- Ronney Daniels (born 1976), American football player
- Ronald Daniel (disambiguation)
