= William Henry Daniels =

American politician

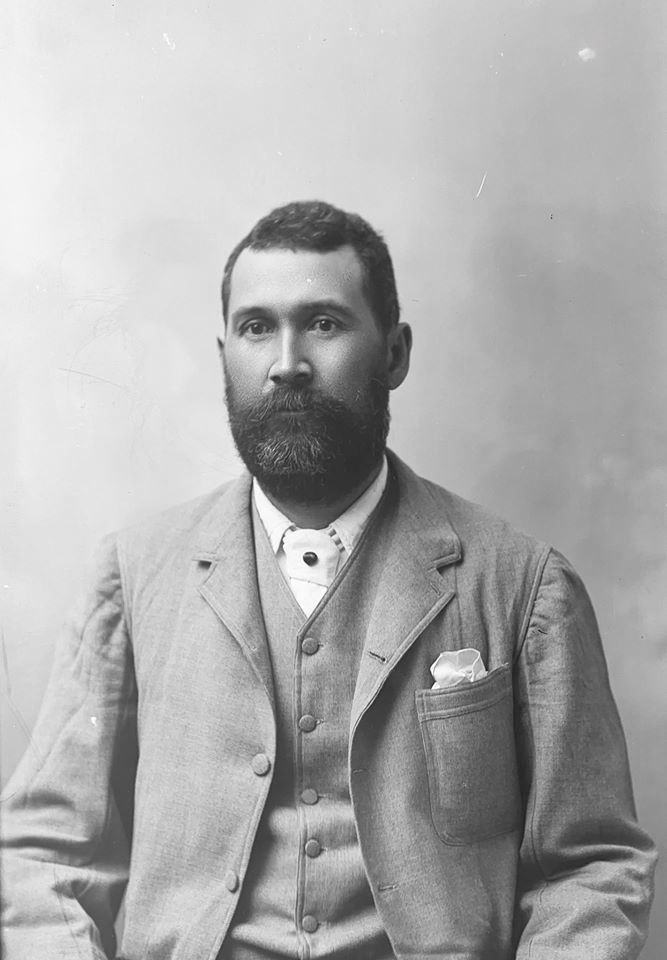

Member of the Kingdom of Hawaii House of Representatives for the district of Wailuku, Maui
- In office 1887–1888

Personal details
- Born: June 2, 1855 Wailuku, Maui, Kingdom of Hawaii
- Died: April 17, 1897 (aged 41) Kailua, Maui, Territory of Hawaii
- Resting place: Iao Community Cemetery
- Party: National Reform; Reform
- Spouse: Margaret Kalauwalu Kahanu
- Children: 10

William Henry Daniels (June 2, 1855 – April 17, 1897) was a Hawaiian judge, lawyer, and businessman of Wailuku, Maui during the Kingdom of Hawaii. He was declined reappointment to his office as district magistrate for refusing to take an oath to the Provisional Government of Hawaii and was arrested by the Republic of Hawaii for suspected involvement in the 1895 Counter-Revolution in Hawaii.

Following his supposed involvement in the Counter-Revolution, Daniels struggled to find employment and to financially support his large family. On April 17, 1897, he committed suicide because of his economic troubles and a domestic disagreement with his wife after she had spent all of his wages. After paying the workers under his management, Daniels shot himself at his home in Kailua. He had placed his pistol in his mouth, with the ball passing through his brain and killing him instantly.

== Early life and family ==
William Henry Daniels was born on June 2, 1855, at Wailuku, on the island of Maui, of Native Hawaiian and British descent. His father was Henry Wilson Daniels (1817–1879), the English-born circuit judge of Maui, and his mother was the British-Hawaiian Nancy Hannah Kamaekalani Copp (1835–1875), who married Judge Daniels on August 7, 1852 at Hana. One of his sisters, Emma Daniels (1857–1906), was the wife of Colonel John Dominis Holt.

On October 23, 1875, Daniels married Margaret Kalauwalu Kahanu (1863–1920), at Waimea, Hawaii. They had ten children. Daniels became a successful businessman. At one point, he purchased the island of Kahoʻolawe with W. H. Cummings and sold it to C. Sneyd-Kynnersley. He was also an investor in the Hawaiian Fruit and Taro Company in Wailuku.

== Political career ==
Daniels was appointed to the position of Labor Contract Agent on January 2, 1883. In 1887, King Kalākaua was forced to sign the Bayonet Constitution under duress by the Hawaiian League, a group of foreign businessman and Hawaiian subjects of American missionary descent including Lorrin A. Thurston. This constitution limited the absolute power of the monarch and strengthened the power of the executive cabinet. It also raised property requirements for suffrage, disenfranchised many poor Native Hawaiians and naturalized Asian citizens, and gave the vote to unnaturalized foreign residents of European or American descent. Instigators of this coup d'état formed the Reform Party, drawing its memberships from Hawaiian conservatives and citizens of foreign descent.

The new constitution also called for an election to be held ninety days after its enactment on September 12, 1887. Daniels ran for the election for a seat on the House of Representatives for the district of Wailuku. He and O. Nawahine ran on the Reform ticket and won both seats in Wailuku for the new political party against the other oppositional candidates. Representatives Daniels would serve in the legislative special session of 1887, which met from November 3, 1887 to May 28, 1888, and the regular session of 1888, which met from May 29 to September 11. In the election of 1890, he ran as a member of the National Reform Party for a six-year term in the House of Nobles for the island of Maui but was defeated in the race.

Around the time of the overthrow of the monarchy, Daniels served as the district magistrate of Wailuku and was a police justice and judge on the Wailuku District Courts. However, his refusal to take the oath of allegiance to the Provisional Government of Hawaii led to his dismissal from the government in 1894. His commission expired on May 30, 1894, and Elia Helekunihi, a supporter of the annexation cause was appointed to replace him despite his popular support from the community. Petitions and demands in the district for his reappointment were ignored.

== Later life and death ==
In 1895, Daniels was arrested and briefly detained by the Republic of Hawaii on charges of conspiracy and involvement in the 1895 Counter-Revolution in Hawaii. Daniels struggled to find employment and support his large family after his release from prison. He found work managing the construction of ditch work in Huelo, Hamakualoa, Maui for the Spreckelsville sugar plantation. On April 17, 1897, he committed suicide because of his economic troubles and a domestic disagreement with his wife after she had spent all of his wages. After paying the workers under his management, Daniels shot himself at his home in Kailua:

Going into the house, he paid no attention whatever to his wife and children, who were there, but proceeded to a small side room. Here he found one of his boys and taking him out of the room, he reentered it again and shut the door. A few moments later a pistol report rang out, and rushing in, the family found him lying on the floor, dead. He had placed the pistol in his mouth, the ball passing through his brain and killing him instantly.

Daniel's obituary in The Hawaiian Star noted that he was "staunch Royalist and in him that party here lose their foremost leader. He was well known all over the islands, and many friends will mourn his death." After a funeral in his hometown of Wailuku, he was buried in the Daniels family plot in the Iao Community Cemetery, beside the spot where his son Henry was buried in 1872.

== See also ==
- Opposition to the overthrow of the Kingdom of Hawaii

== Bibliography ==
- Blount, James Henderson (1895). The Executive Documents of the House of Representatives for the Second Session of the Fifty-Third Congress, 1893–'94 in Thirty-One Volumes. Washington, DC: U.S. Government Printing Office. OCLC 191710879.
- Hawaii (1918). Lydecker, Robert Colfax (ed.). Roster Legislatures of Hawaii, 1841–1918. Honolulu: Hawaiian Gazette Company. OCLC 60737418.
- Holt, John Dominis; Sinesky, Alice (1987). "John Dominis Holt". Watumull Foundation Oral History Project. 16. Honolulu. hdl:10524/48676. OCLC 663425247.
- Kuykendall, Ralph Simpson (1967). The Hawaiian Kingdom 1874–1893, The Kalakaua Dynasty. Vol. 3. Honolulu: University of Hawaii Press. ISBN 978-0-87022-433-1. OCLC 500374815.
- Osorio, Jon Kamakawiwoʻole (2002). Dismembering Lāhui: A History of the Hawaiian Nation to 1887. Honolulu: University of Hawaii Press. ISBN 0-8248-2549-7. OCLC 48579247.
- Williams, Ronald Jr. (December 2013). Claiming Christianity: The Struggle Over God and Nation in Hawaiʻi, 1880–1900 (PhD thesis). Honolulu: University of Hawaii at Manoa. hdl:10125/42321.
