= George Daniels (cricketer) =

English cricketer

Personal information
- Full name: George Daniels
- Born: 19 September 1807; Midhurst, Sussex, England
- Died: 2 October 1853 (aged 46); Midhurst, Sussex, England
- Batting: Unknown

Domestic team information
- Years: Team
- 1839: Sussex
- 1830–1835: Sussex

Career statistics
Competition	First-class
Matches	5
Runs scored	46
Batting average	5.11
100s/50s	–/–
Top score	13
Balls bowled	–
Wickets	–
Bowling average	–
5 wickets in innings	–
10 wickets in match	–
Best bowling	–
Catches/stumpings	4/–
- Source: Cricinfo, 22 December 2011

George Daniels (19 September 1807 – 2 October 1853) was an English cricketer. Daniels' batting style is unknown. He was born at Midhurst, Sussex.

Daniels made his first-class debut for Sussex against Surrey in 1830. He made three further first-class appearances for Sussex, against Surrey in a return match in 1830 and Nottinghamshire and Yorkshire in 1835. He later played in Sussex County Cricket Club's inaugural first-class match against the Marylebone Cricket Club at Lord's in 1839. In his total of five first-class matches, Daniels scored a total of 46 runs at an average of 5.11, with a high score of 13.

He died at the town of his birth on 2 October 1853.
