= Lissa (Lycia) =

Ancient Lycian town

Coordinates: 36°39′51″N 28°50′21″E

Lissa (Ancient Greek: Λίσσα) was a town of ancient Lycia, mentioned by Ptolemy.

Its site is located near Kızılağaç, Anatolia, Turkey. Inscriptions and tombs have been found at the site.

The site was explored by the British antiquaries Theodore and Mabel Bent in March 1888.
