= Charlie Daniels (disambiguation) =

Charlie Daniels (1936–2020) was an American singer, songwriter and musician.

Charlie Daniels may also refer to:

- Charlie Daniels (album), an album by Charlie Daniels
- Charlie Daniels (baseball) (1861–1938), baseball player for the 1884 Boston Reds
- Charlie Daniels (politician) (1939–2023), U.S. politician
- Charlie Daniels (footballer) (born 1986), retired English professional footballer

== See also ==
- Charles Daniel (disambiguation)
- Charles Daniels (disambiguation)
