= Fletcher Daniels =

American politician

Fletcher D. Daniels (September 8, 1919 – March 15, 1999) was a Democratic politician who served in the Missouri House of Representatives. Born in Muskogee, Oklahoma, he was first elected to the Missouri House of Representatives in 1984. Daniels retired from the U.S. Postal Service after 30 years to serve on the Kansas City school board. He was the first African-American Speaker Pro Tem in the history of Missouri. The Fletcher Daniels State Office Building built in 1967 was renamed in his honor.
