= Lissa Martinez =

American ocean engineer

Lissa Ann Martinez is an American ocean engineer and consultant from San Antonio, Texas. During her career, she has worked on policy-based solutions for environmental challenges. Following her graduation from the Massachusetts Institute of Technology (MIT), Martinez worked as a federal employee for the US Maritime Administration and the US Coast Guard. Her focus was shipping-related pollution control, maritime health, and safety. Martinez has also worked for the National Research Council and was on MIT's board of trustees. In San Antonio, she has been involved with urban forestry initiatives.

== Early life and education ==
Lissa Ann Martinez was born in San Antonio, Texas on July 15, 1954. Her father, Edmundo O. Martinez, was a US Marine Corps Staff Sergeant. She graduated from Jefferson High School and won a scholarship to MIT. Martinez graduated from MIT in 1976 with a bachelor's degree in ocean engineering. She earned her master's degree in technology and public policy from MIT's Department of Ocean Engineering in 1980. Her thesis was "Hazardous Chemical Incineration at Sea: A Disposal Alternative for the United States" and her thesis supervisor was Judith Tegger Kildow.

== Engineering career ==
From 1976 to 1994, Martinez's work focused on shipping-related pollution control and maritime health and safety. She started her career as a general engineer at the US Maritime Administration's Office of Ship Construction in 1976. Martinez was a member of the United States Interagency Ad Hoc Work Group for the Chemical Waste Incinerator Ship Program. Martinez and Daniel Leubecker's paper "Chemical Waste Incinerator Ships - The Interagency Program to Develop a Capability in the United States" was presented at a Society of Naval Architects and Marine Engineers meeting in 1981. She continued working for the Maritime Administration until 1983. She was elected as the first Fellow of the National Academy of Engineering in 1984. Martinez worked for the US Coast Guard as a staff mechanical engineer from 1985 to 1988. As a staff officer for the National Research Council, she worked on US compliance with an international agreement to reduce oceanic plastic pollution. She established a private consulting practice specializing in maritime environmental protection and safety beginning in mid-1988.

Following her work as a federal employee, Martinez continued on in the same field as a consulting engineer. She was a founding member of the DC chapter of the Society of Hispanic Professional Engineers. In 1997, Martinez was elected to a five-year term on MIT's board of trustees.

== Urban forestry in San Antonio ==
Following flooding incidents in 1998 and 2003, Martinez turned her focus to urban forestry. She attended the 2003 National Urban Forest Conference, participated in tree inventories and tree plantings, and measured Champion Trees. In 2009, Martinez trained as a Texas master naturalist. In San Antonio, she worked with organizations dedicated to local creek cleanup. She conducted tours of Olmos Creek and monitored water quality through the citizen science testing initiative Texas Stream Team.

After reading the San Antonio Climate Action & Adaptation Plan (CAAP) and finding nothing on trees and forestry, Martinez volunteered to help with the plan.

== Personal life ==
Martinez married Brian Hughes, who she met as a fellow undergraduate at MIT. They had two sons. While living in Takoma Park, Maryland in 1991, Martinez was a member of a task force that created new election districts, leading to changes in the law allowing non-citizens to vote in city elections. Martinez and Hughes moved back to San Antonio in the 1990s. Beginning in the late 1990s, they started investing in high-tech companies in San Antonio. They also represented MIT by recruiting and interviewing students from the area. Martinez lives in Castle Hills.
