= Southwick–Daniels Farm =

- U.S. National Register of Historic Places
- U.S. Historic district
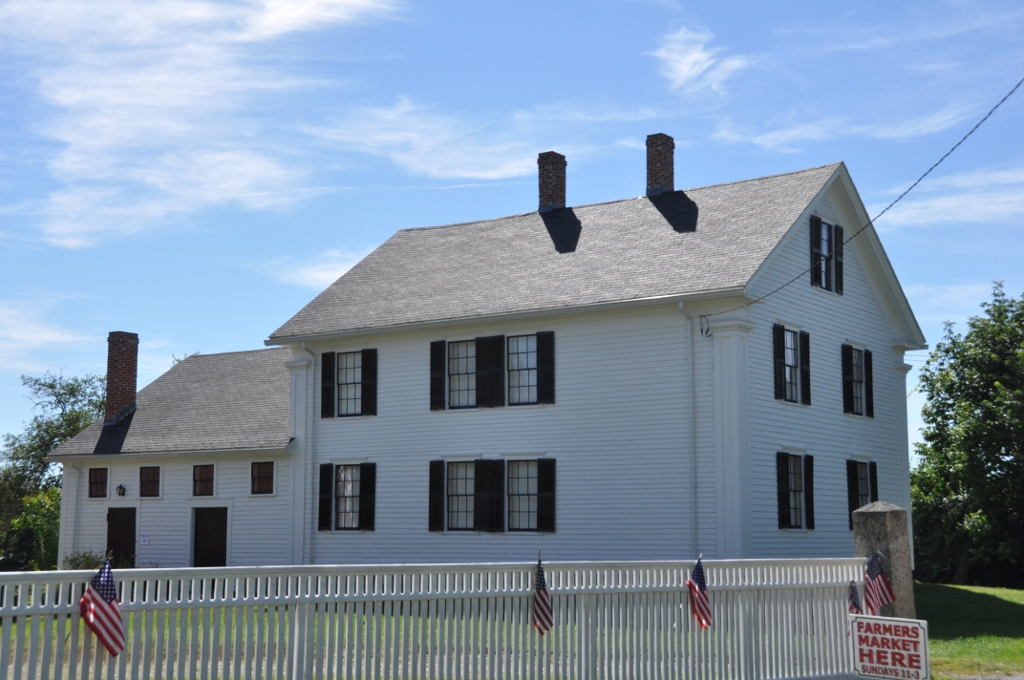

- Location within Massachusetts Location within the United States
- Location: 286 Mendon Street, Blackstone, Massachusetts
- Coordinates: 42°3′26″N 71°32′54″W
- Area: 112 acres (45 ha)
- Built: 1793
- Architectural style: Greek Revival
- NRHP reference No.: 95001030
- Added to NRHP: August 22, 1995

The Southwick–Daniels Farm is a historic farm in Blackstone, Massachusetts. The farmstead was established c. 1750, when the oldest portion of the main farmhouse was built, and has been in the same family since 1797. This house portion is now the ell of the main house, which was built c. 1830. There are three other buildings that date to the 19th century: the barn (c. 1850), the henhouse (c. 1830), and the cider mill (c. 1870). Other important aspects of the farm's landscape are its stone walls, well houses and a corn crib.

The farm was listed on the National Register of Historic Places in 1995. It is now a living history museum operated by the Daniels Farmstead Foundation.

== See also ==
- National Register of Historic Places listings in Worcester County, Massachusetts
