= Shawn Daniels =

Shawn or Sean Daniel(s) may refer to:

- Shawn Daniel, American football coach
- Shawn Daniels (basketball) (born 1979), American basketball player
- Shawn Daniels (Canadian football) (born 1966), Canadian football player
- Sean Daniel (born 1951), American film producer and movie executive
- Sean Daniel (basketball) (born 1989), Israeli basketball player
- Sean Daniels (born 1991), American football player

== See also ==
- LaShawn Daniels, American songwriter
- Sean Danielsen (born 1982), singer and guitarist for American alternative rock band Smile Empty Soul
