= Charles Wilberforce Daniels =

British physician and pioneer of tropical medicine

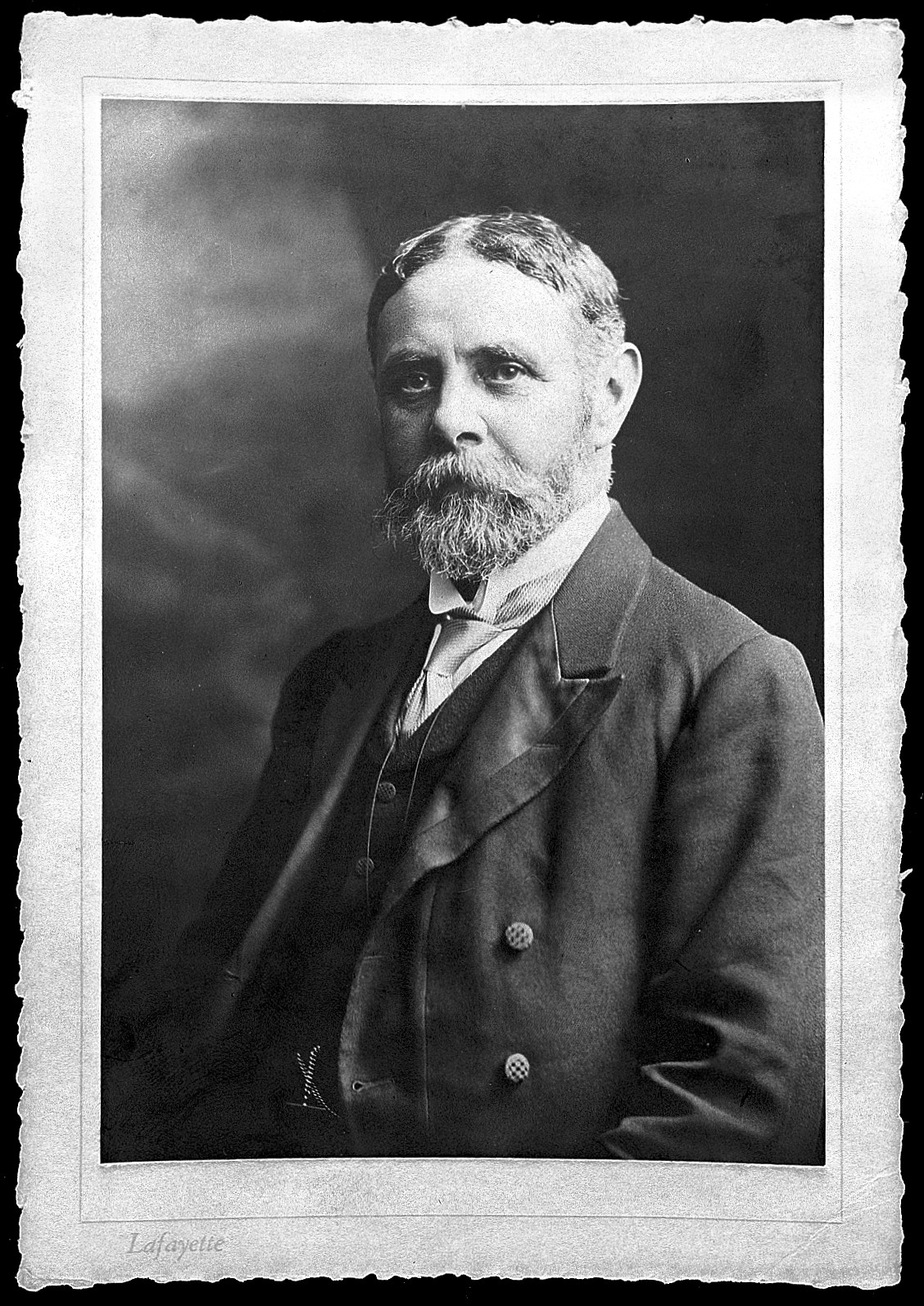
- Born: 9 May 1862; Manchester
- Died: 6 August 1927 (aged 65); Ilford
- Occupation: Physician

Charles Wilberforce Daniels FRCP (1862–1927) was a British physician and pioneer of tropical medicine, known for his confirmation of Ronald Ross's 1898 discovery of the role of mosquito-vectored malarial parasites in avian malaria.

After education at Manchester Grammar School, Charles Daniels received a B.A. degree from Trinity College, Cambridge in 1883. After training at the London Hospital he received his M.B. in 1886. After medical residency at the London Hospital and Queen Charlotte's Lying-in Hospital, in 1890 he joined the Colonial Medical Service. After four years of original investigation in the Fijian Islands, he went to British Guiana and investigated filariasis. In 1899 Sir Patrick Manson sent him to Calcutta to investigate malaria. Daniels then went to Nyasaland to investigate blackwater fever. Returning to England in 1900, he became in 1901 the director of the London School of Tropical Medicine. For two years from 1903 to 1905 he was director of the Institute for Medical Research in Kuala Lumpur and then returned to London. In 1912, upon the retirement of Sir Patrick Manson, he became Medical Advisor to the Colonial Office. In 1913 he was elected F.R.C.P.

== Publications ==
- Studies in Laboratory Work. 1903.; 2nd edition, 1907 with A. T. Stanton
- Tropical Medicine and Hygiene. J. Bale, sons & Danielsson. December 1909.; vol. I, 1909 with E. Wilkinson; vol. II, 1910 with A. Alcock; vol. III, 1912
