= Charles F. Daniels =

American baseball umpire (1849–1932)

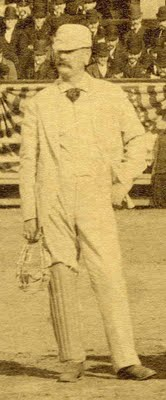
- Born: March 13, 1849; Colchester, Connecticut, US
- Died: March 23, 1932 (aged 83); Norwich, Connecticut, US
- Occupation: Major League Baseball Umpire
- Years active: 1874–1876, 1878–1880, 1883–1885, 1887–1889

Charles F. Daniels (March 13, 1849 – March 23, 1932) was an American umpire in Major League Baseball. He umpired professionally from 1874 to 1889. He was among the original umpires hired when the National League (NL) was founded in 1876, and was the last active umpire among that group when he retired after the 1889 season. His served in the National Association (1874–75), the National League (1876, 1878–1880, 1887–1888), and the American Association (1883–1885, 1889), as well as the Eastern League and as a referee in college baseball. He is credited as discovering Connie Mack. He called two no-hitters in his career; one was the first no-hitter in major league history, and the other was a perfect game.

== Career ==
Born in Colchester, Connecticut, Daniels began his professional umpire debut on September 7, 1874, in the National Association. He umpired the rest of that season and then the 1875 season. In 1875, he officially umpired 22 games, all but one as the lone arbiter in the field. When the Association dissolved and was replaced by the National League, he was hired on to the new league. That inaugural season he called 45 games, one which was the first major league no-hitter, when George Bradley of St. Louis Brown Stockings blanked the Hartford Dark Blues on July 15, a 2–0 victory. He did not appear in the field on the major league level for the 1877, but did umpire nine games in 1878 and another 46 games in 1879. He umpired just 28 games in 1880, but one notable game on June 17, when John Montgomery Ward threw the second perfect game in Major League history.

Daniels did not umpire any games in for the 1881 or 1882 seasons, but did make his return for the 1883 season for the American Association. When he started, he received from $5 to $10 per game. In his first year with the American Association, Daniels was selected to umpire the deciding game between the St. Louis Browns and the Philadelphia Athletics. His game totals increased significantly in the next few years. He umpired 91 games that season, and stayed with the Association until the 1885 season, when in addition to his Association games, he called two games with the National League. He called a career-high 110 games in 1888 then returned the Association for his last season, umpiring 19 games in 1889. His career totals include 504 games, over the course of his 13 seasons.

== Other baseball capacities ==
The Hartford Club of the Eastern League was out of funds and the league decided that for the team to remain, it had to raise what was owed and that the team hire a new, competent manager. Daniels became the team's new manager for the 1886 season. In a move to keep the team solvent, he sold their two star players, catcher Connie Mack, and pitcher Frank Gilmore.

== Post-career ==
At the time of the 1930 U.S. Census, He was living in a rented home with his brother Robert on Parham Road in Colchester. His occupation is noted as being a farmer. In the early 1930s, he resided with his brother Eugene on an isolated farm near Colchester off the New London-Hartford Road. On March 21, 1932, Charles was found unconscious, lying in the snow on a country road where he had apparently fallen during a snowstorm, suffering from cuts and exposure. He died two days later in Norwich, Connecticut, at the age of 83.

== See also ==
- List of Major League Baseball umpires (disambiguation)
