= Michael Daniels =

British psychologist (born 1950)

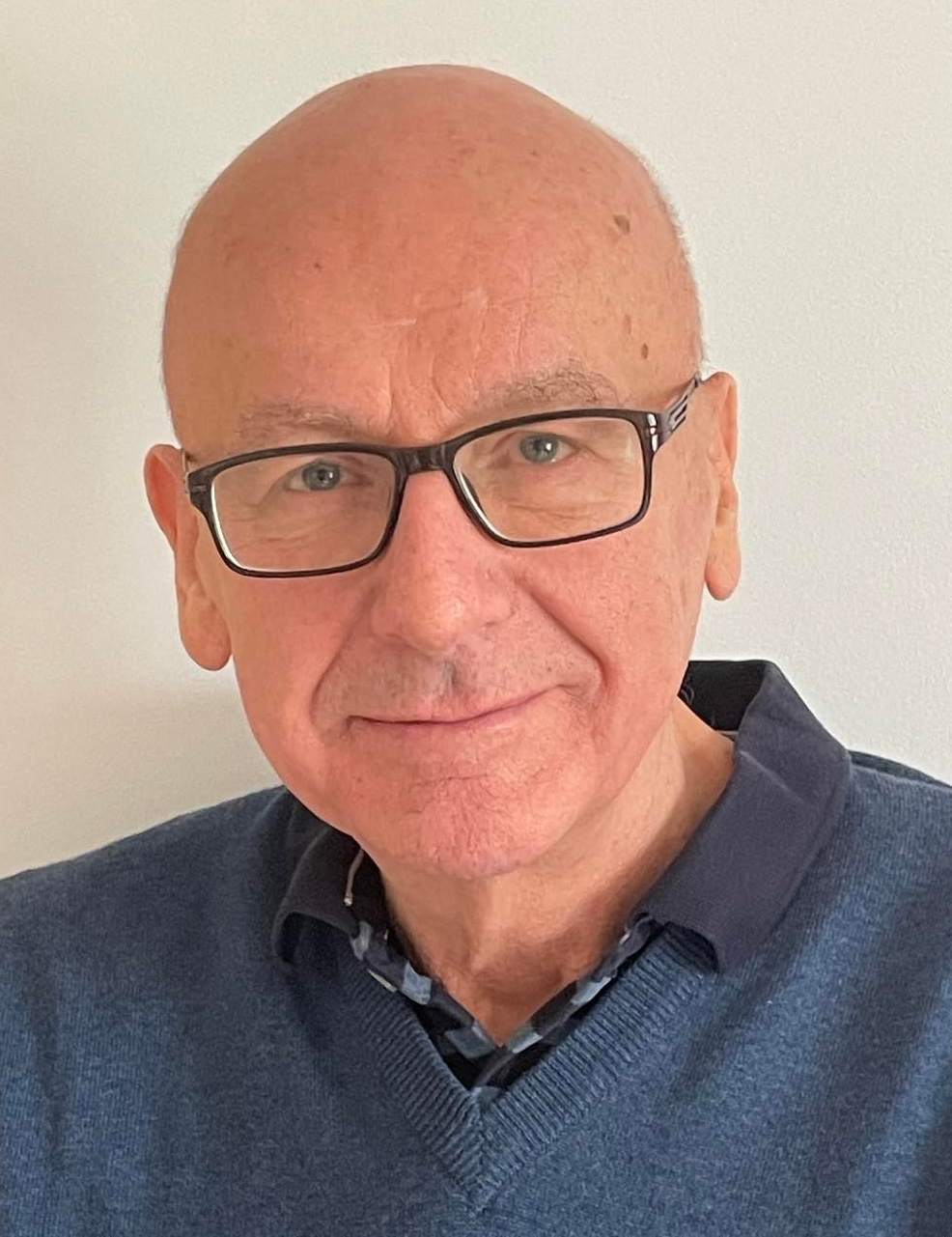
- Daniels in 2023
- Born: Michael Inkerman Daniels; 1950 (age 75–76)
- Education: University of Leeds
- Occupations: Psychologist, University lecturer
- Employer: Liverpool John Moores University
- Known for: Transpersonal psychology, Parapsychology, Jungian psychology

Dr Michael Daniels (born 1950) is a British transpersonal psychologist and parapsychologist. A Chartered Psychologist and Associate Fellow of the British Psychological Society, he was formerly a senior lecturer in Psychology at Liverpool John Moores University and Editor of Transpersonal Psychology Review (The Journal of the British Psychological Society Transpersonal Psychology Section).

Daniels studied psychology at the University of Leeds, where he obtained a BSc (Hons, 1st Class) Psychology (1974), and PhD Psychology (1981). His doctoral dissertation examined the relationship of mental disorder and personality to Abraham Maslow's theory of self-actualization and Lawrence Kohlberg's theory of moral development. Daniels also trained and practiced for six years as an Honorary Psychotherapist (psychodynamic) within the British National Health Service.

== Selected bibliography ==
- Daniels, M. (2023). The Watchword Personality Test: A Complete Practical Guide. watchwordtest.com.
- Daniels, M. (2005 / 2021). Shadow, Self, Spirit: Essays in Transpersonal Psychology. Imprint Academic.
- Daniels, M. (2017). The I Ching Oracle: A Modern Approach to Ancient Wisdom. Psychic Science Books.
- Daniels, M. (2002). The "Brother Doli" case: Investigation of apparent poltergeist-type manifestations in North Wales. Journal of the Society for Psychical Research, 66.4, No. 869, 193-221. Reprinted in R. Wiseman & C. Watt (eds.) (2005). Parapsychology (The International Library of Psychology). Ashgate Publishing.
- Daniels, M. (1992 / 2015). Self-Discovery the Jungian Way: The Watchword Technique. Routledge.
- Daniels, M. (1981). Morality and the Person: An Examination of the Relationship of Moral Development to Self-Actualization, Mental Disorder, and Personality. Unpublished doctoral dissertation, University of Leeds.
