= David Daniels (poet) =

American poet (1923-2008)

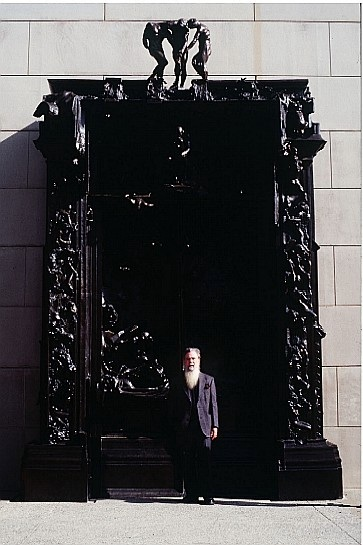
- Daniels emerging from Rodin's Gates Of Hell into The Gates Of Paradise
- Born: October 11, 1933; Newark, New Jersey, U.S.
- Died: May 12, 2008 (aged 74); Berkeley, California, U.S.
- Occupation: Visual poet
- Style: Visual poetry

David Daniels (October 11, 1933 – May 12, 2008) was an American visual poet.

== Early life ==
Daniels was born in Beth Israel Hospital in Newark, New Jersey, and grew up in Maplewood, New Jersey.

== Career ==
He made words out of pictures and pictures out of words for over 60 years. Visual Poetry: The Shape Poem: Shapes tell the words what to say and words tell the shapes what to form.

His collection of more than 350 visual poems in PDF format, The Gates of Paradise (2000), as well as his autobiographical collection of more than 250 visual poems, Years (2003), are available online in their entirely at UbuWeb, edited by Kenneth Goldsmith; and at his own website The Gates of Paradise. His collection of visual biographical poems, Humans, a 200+ Human Beingèd Hymn To Humanity, is a work in progress.

Daniels' poems, paintings, manuscripts, and memorabilia are archived at The Poetry/Rare Books Collection of The University Libraries, State University of New York at Buffalo; the Sackner Archive of Concrete and Visual Poetry; the Ohio State University Libraries; the British Library; and the Mata and Arthur Jaffe Collection of Books as Aesthetic Objects. Selections from his body of work are featured online in a variety of zines, blogs, and collections.

Daniels' work has been featured in exhibitions and galleries on three continents.

== Personal life and death ==
Daniels lived in Berkeley, California, and died at home among friends.
