= William John Daniels =

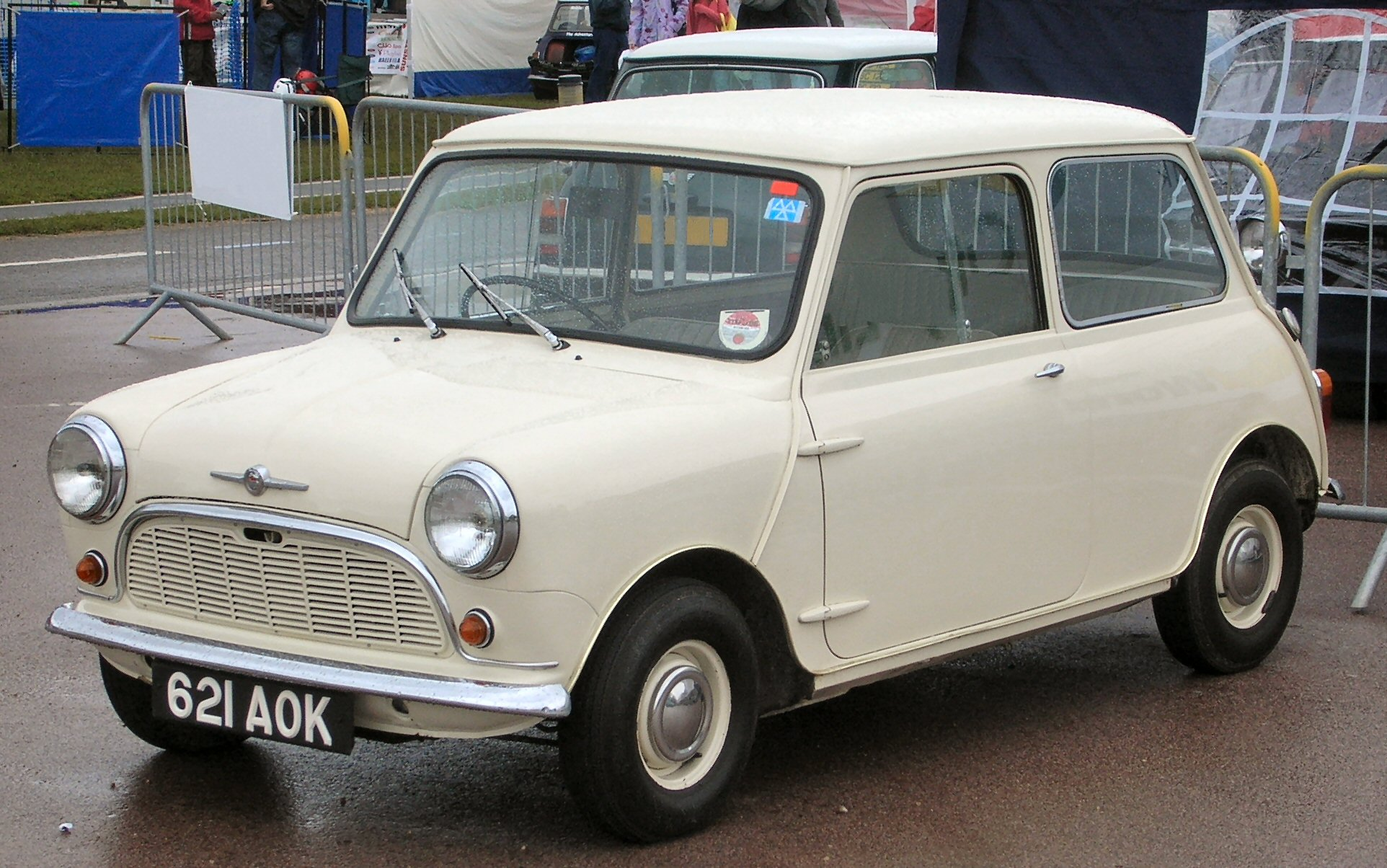
Morris Mini-Minor

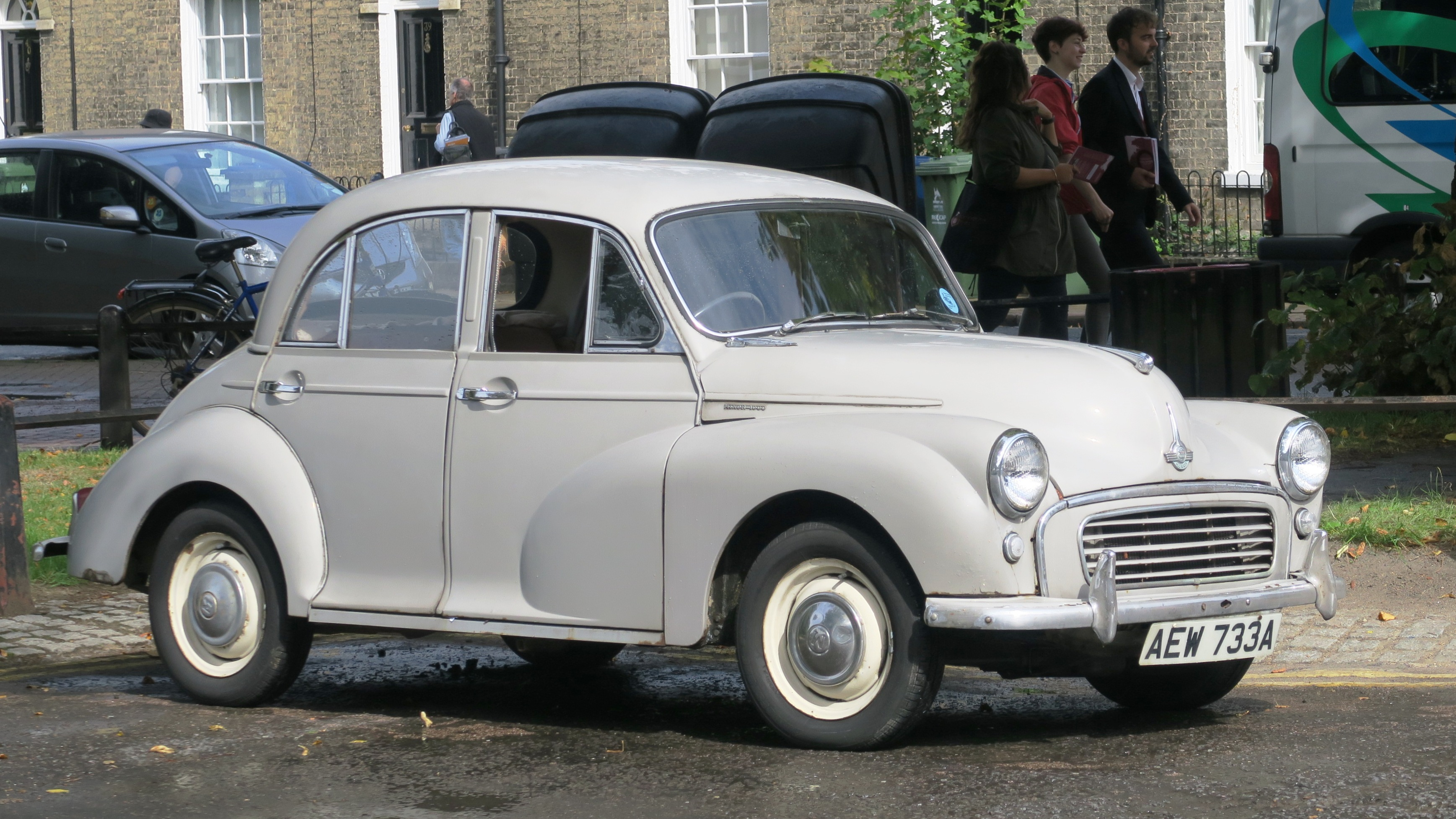
Morris Minor

William John Daniels, "Jack" Daniels, (8 February 1912 – 27 November 2004) was a British car engineer who worked directly with Sir Alec Issigonis for 35 years and was associated with such projects as the 1948 Morris Minor and the 1959 Mini.

He was an invited guest at the 1999 awards ceremony in Las Vegas when the Mini was voted the second most influential car of the 20th century.

His working life from 1926-1977 was spent as a draughtsman, designer and development engineer for William Morris's 'ever evolving' Morris Motors; Morris Garages (MG Cars); British Motor Corporation; British Motor Holdings; British Leyland. His project involvement included the 1935 MG R-type racing car; the 1962 Morris 1100; the 1969 Austin Maxi; the 1973 Austin Allegro and the 1971 Morris Marina.

== Early life and education ==
Daniels was born into a farming family in New Marston, a once rural area now engulfed by Oxford city. He was educated at the now defunct 'Oxford Central school for Boys' in Gloucester Green where he excelled at woodwork and technical drawing and the school recommended him to Morris Garages. Thus in 1927, aged 16, he joined as their first unindentured apprentice engineering draughtsman, and by 1929 he was attached to Hubert Charles, MG's Chief Draughtsman, who he described as "my real tutor".

== Career ==
The MG operation was moved to Abingdon, where Daniels formed the working partnership with Issigonis that would last for 35 years. He converted the freehand ideas sketches, sometimes on table-cloths etc, into working technical drawings.

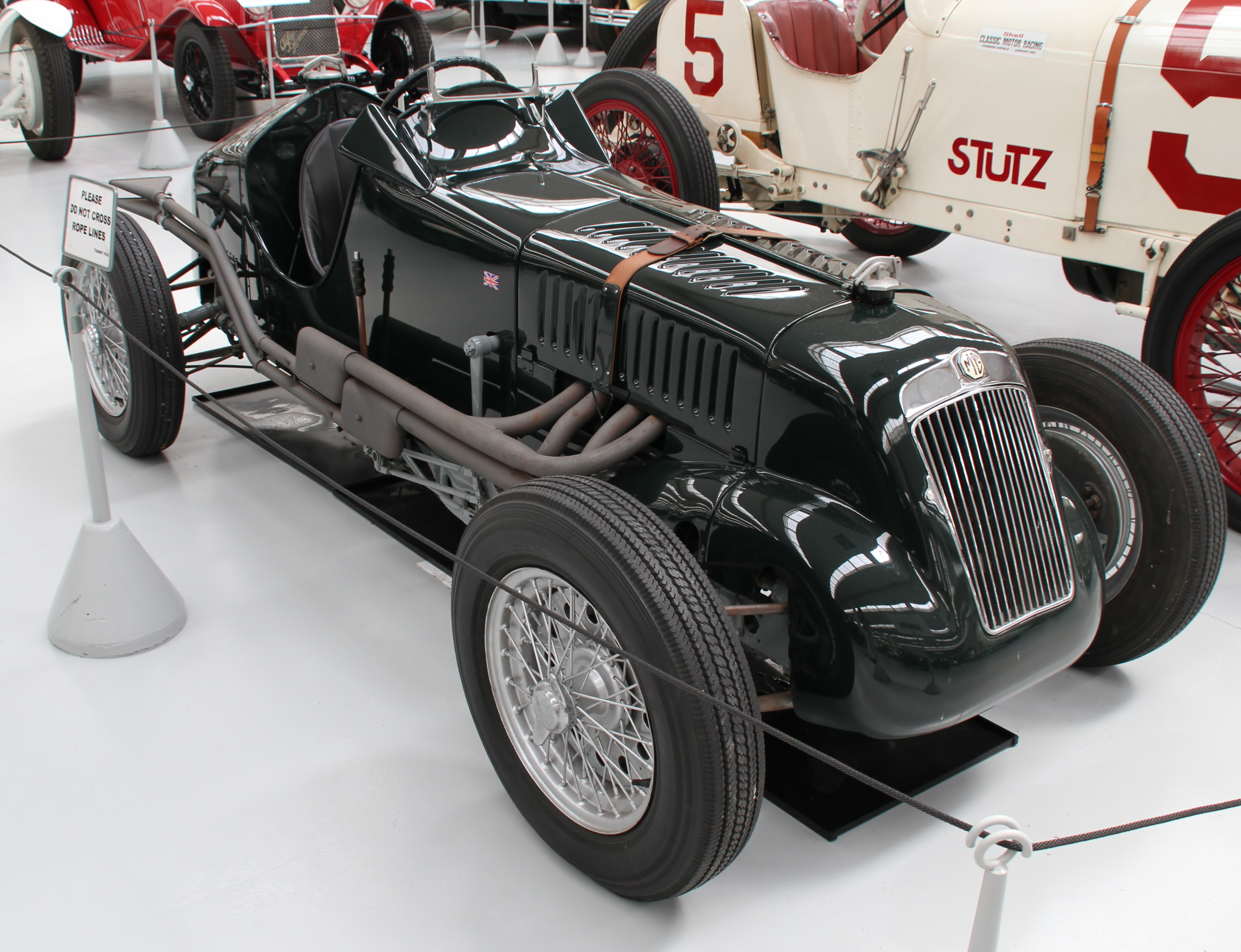
1935 MG R Type

After apprenticeship he worked on various projects for Morris Garages (M.G.), including the advanced MG R-type racing car, which had fully independent suspension. Around 1936 he moved to the new factory in Cowley.

=== Morris Minor ===
During World War II the factory designed military vehicles, but from 1942 he was already working, with Issigonis, on a secret new Morris car, codenamed "Mosquito" after the warplane. It was launched in 1948 as the Morris Minor. Issigonis described Daniels as "the best all-round draughtsman in the country".

=== Mini ===
After Issigonis' departure in 1952, Daniels completed the task of turning a groundbreaking idea into reality - a front-drive, transverse engined, 'Minor' prototype, which he used from February 1956 to commute to the new BMC engineering centre at Longbridge, Birmingham. He called it the company's "safest car" because of its outstanding roadholding.

In 1955 Issigonis returned, and the front wheel drive Minor was key to the Mini project which was launched in 1959. Jack Daniels characterised their relationship as "90 per cent his perspiration versus the 10 per cent inspiration" of Issigonis "We got on well together, but he was the gaffer."

== Legacy ==
Rob Oldaker, product development director of MG Rover, originally a trainee under Daniels at British Leyland, said "Jack will be remembered for his pragmatic input to many cars. He guided many towards successful careers in the industry."

== Personal life ==
Daniels was married to Mabel, with whom he had one son, one daughter, and one son deceased. In 1956 he moved with his wife and family to King's Norton, Birmingham.

=== Later life ===
Daniels died near Bournemouth after suffering from cancer for two years.
