= Lissa Explains it All =

Lissa Explains it All site logo

LissaExplains.com is a website created by Alyssa "Lissa" Daniels (born 1986), a girl from Orlando, Florida, to teach people, especially children, how to make their own Web sites. She was 11 years old when she set up the first site in 1997, and is currently a university junior in Florida. Her site has taught many people how to create a Web site by writing their own HTML without the use of Web page creators. The web site includes tutorials and an internet forum.

== History ==
Daniels had trouble remembering all of the HTML codes that she needed to create her site, so she created a page which listed HTML codes. Eventually, more people noticed this page, and as she got more requests for the URL, she decided she would make the site public, first publishing it at GeoCities. When she was 12 years old in 1998, she decided to purchase a domain name for her site, and renamed the site "Lissa Explains it All".

Daniels was approached in August 1999 by Ronald L. Wagner, columnist for The Dallas Morning News. He had seen her site online and wanted to feature her and her site in his weekly column, "Family PC Fun". The article was published on September 26, 1999. At the time, her site was using large amounts of bandwidth and the monthly hosting cost for her site was beginning to be too expensive for her to keep it online. She discussed this with Wagner, who suggested that she contact a few Internet advertising agencies to see if they would like to advertise on her site. She was accepted by one agency, and soon started earning enough money through advertising to keep Lissa Explains it All online.

By summer 2000, her site was receiving over 500,000 hits a month. In June 2000, CNN Headline News aired a story about her and the website. The CNN show Science and Technology also aired a story about her and her site in July 2000.

Daniels later added a forum to her site because of the large volume of email she received. The forum allowed her visitors to get answers to the many questions they had. Lissa's HTML help forum had over 75,000 members, but due to a hard drive failure with site backups that occurred in August 2007, was offline for almost two years. The forums were reinstalled on 3 July 2009, but later went down again and are currently not available. While the forums are not available, the tutorial sections of the site are still online.
