= Scott Daniels (judge) =

American politician

Judge of the Third Judicial District, Utah
- In office 1982–1992
- Appointed by: Governor Scott M. Matheson

Utah State Legislator

Personal details
- Born: August 12, 1948 Payson, Utah, U.S.
- Spouse: Chrissy Daniels
- Education: B.A., Political Science, Brigham Young University (1972); J.D., University of Utah College of Law (1975)
- Profession: Attorney; Judge; Politician
- Known for: Judicial work in Utah; public service; rights of victims of crime

Scott Daniels (born August 12, 1948) is an attorney who has been a prominent public figure in the state of Utah, having served as a member of the Utah House of Representatives and a State judge.

== Early life and education ==
Scott Daniels was born on August 12, 1948, in Payson, Utah. He attended Brigham Young University where he received a Bachelor of Arts in Political Science and graduated in 1972. He obtained his Juris Doctor from the University of Utah's College of Law in 1975 where he was the Associate Editor of the Utah Law Review (1974–75). He received membership in both the Order of the Coif and the Bar and Gavel Society which respectively recognize top students academically and based on community service. He is married to Chrissy Daniels.

== Legal career ==
Daniels was a trial attorney with the Salt Lake City law firm of Snow, Christensen and Martineau from 1975, when he was admitted to the Bar, until he became a District Judge in 1982. As a Judge he was mostly concerned with the rights of victims of crime. His practice was predominantly in the areas of personal injury, property damage, medical malpractice, insurance, civil rights and construction.

=== Activities related to the Law ===
- President of the Utah State Bar, 2001–02
- Utah Bar Commission, 1994–2000
- Member of the Utah House of Representatives, 2000–04
- Utah Judicial Council, 1998–2000
- Master of the Bench, Sherman A. Christensen American Inn of Court I, (president, 1988–89)
- Commission on Criminal and Juvenile Justice, 1984–92
- Constitutional Revision Commission, 2002–04
- Utah Sentencing Commission, 2003–10
- Supreme Court Advisory committee on Professionalism, 2002–Present
- Private law practice exclusively in the areas of mediation, arbitration and other dispute resolution

=== Civic activities ===
- Odyssey House Human Services Award, 1992
- Governor's Department of corrections Advisory Board, 1999–2001
- Sierra Club Utah Chapter Executive Committee, 2004–08
- State Records Committee, 2009–Present
- Rocky Mountain Innocence Center Board, 2002–Present

=== Other activities ===
- Served in the U.S. Army, 1968–70
- Candidate for Utah Attorney General, 1992

== Utah State legislature career ==
Daniels served on the Utah House of Representatives from 2001 to 2005. His points of focus were:

- Open government, specifically requiring legislative caucuses to be open.
- Changes in Judicial Code, this included a bill which provided for expungement of juvenile records.
- Providing funding for children's justice centers in Wasatch and Emery Counties.

== Judicial career ==
Daniels served as Judge of the Third Judicial District for ten years, from 1982 until 1992. He was appointed by Governor Scott Matheson and served as presiding judge from 1986 to 1990.

=== Interest in the plight of victims of crime ===
Governor Matheson called for a task force on collection of restitution for crime victims which was co-chaired by Daniels (while on the bench), and Le Roy McAlister. The task force was successful in drafting legislation establishing the Utah Office for Victims of Crime and setting a surcharge on fines which would provide funding to help compensate victims of crime for injuries which were not covered by insurance. Daniels was then the first chair of "The Utah Council on Crime Victims," which was established by governor Matheson, and ultimately went on to pass an amendment to the Utah Constitution to give victims of crime Constitutional rights on equal status with those enjoyed by persons accused of committing crimes.

=== Decision regarding child sex offender ===
In 1991, the Utah Supreme Court upheld Daniels' prison sentences against three child sexual abusers. Craig B. Herman, Thomas J. Oopfar and Bobby Lee Boog Jr, claimed that their rights to equal protection under the law were violated because other child sex offenders convicted of similar crimes have been given more lenient sentences. This lawsuit was filed in the 3rd District Court and was rejected by Daniels. The decision was then appealed to the Utah Supreme Court where the decision was upheld.

=== Stance on marital rape ===
In February 1991, Daniels voiced his opinion in support of legislation that makes marital rape illegal, saying "this will make a strong statement to the people of Utah that women are not property of their husbands."

=== Sandy "ski connect" road construction ===
In August 1988, Daniels issued an injunction to halt construction of the "ski connect" road which would later be built to connect 90th south and 7th East with 94th South and 1150 East. the injunction required the Utah Department of Transportation to hold a public hearing before the construction halt could be re-evaluated.
