= William Daniels (artist) =

English artist

William Daniels (born 1976 in Brighton) is an English photo-realist artist.

Based in London, he produces oil paintings that recreate iconic historical works—portraits, landscapes etc.—using as subjects rough maquettes constructed from waste card and paper. For instance, his William Blake II is based on the Thomas Phillips portrait of William Blake. Other works recreated include Caravaggio's David with the Head of Goliath, Courbet's, and Turner's The Shipwreck.

He has shown work in many exhibitions including Waste Material at The Drawing Room, London; The Darkest Hour at Leisure Club Mogadishni, Copenhagen; William Daniels at Marc Foxx, Los Angeles; and William Daniels & Fiona Jardine at the Transmission Gallery, Glasgow.

Notable solo exhibitions include at the Luhring Augustine Gallery in New York City, 2010 and 2013 and at the Marc Foxx Gallery, Los Angeles in 2011.
