= Joe Martin (orangutan) filmography =

Joe Martin the orangutan was a film star of the 1910s and 1920s.

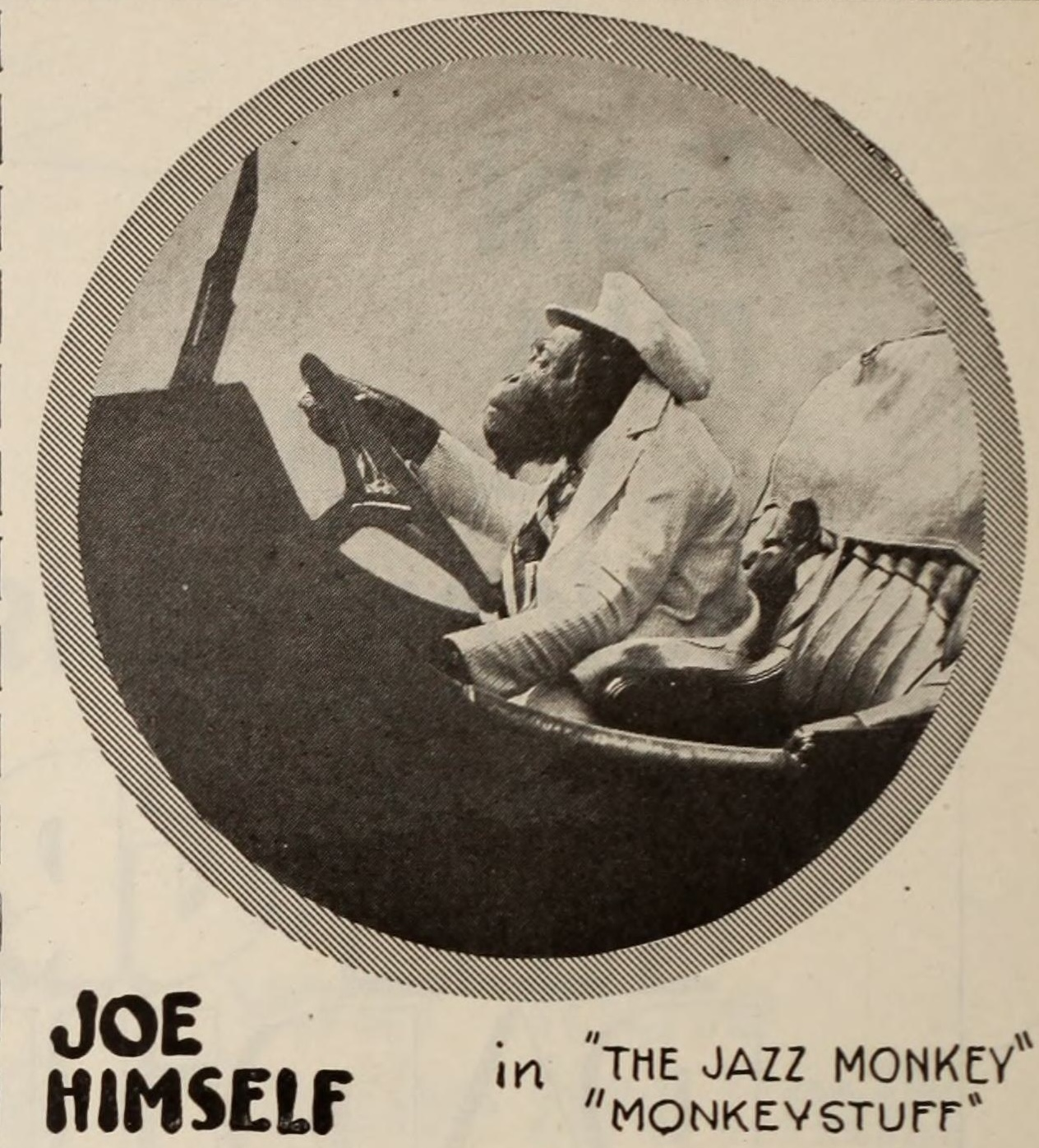
Joe Martin "driving" in a movie

1. Title unknown, one-reel comedy directed by Allen Turner
2. Universal Ike Makes a Monkey of Himself (1914)
3. Mike and Jake Live Close to Nature (1914)
4. What Happened to Schultz? (1914)
5. Actors from the Jungle (1915), Powers, one reel, Joe Martin credit as "Chimpanzee Charlie, the most accomplished Simian actor in the world"
6. When Brains Are Needed (1915), Big U, "...when the orang-outang escapes..."
7. The Black Box (1915), 15-episode serial directed by Otis Turner
8. Joe Martin Turns 'Em Loose (1915), two reels, comedy, directed by Rex De Rosselli and Paul Bourgeois
9. Lady Baffles and Detective Duck (1915), "a spoof of cliff-hanger serials in eleven one-reel chapters," directed by Allen Curtis. (Joe Martin appears in extant episodes four, "Baffles Aids Cupid," and nine, "When the Wets Went Dry.")
10. The Janitor (1916), directed by Wallace Beery
11. The Missing Link, or What Darwin Missed (1916), one-reel, directed by Beverly Griffith
12. Hungry Happy's Dream (1916), directed by Guy Hedlund, working title H. Oboe Rhodes, Animal King
13. A Strange Confession (1916), a 101 Bison-Jay Hunt production, mystery drama
14. After Midnight (1916), one-reel comedy, directed by Rex De Rosselli
15. In African Wilds (1917), directed by Henry McRae
16. The Red Ace (1917), a 16-episode serial
17. Man and Beast (1917), five-reel feature, directed by Henry McRae, costarring "baby Stecker" and Charlie the elephant (MoMA)
18. Amelita's Friend (1917), two reels, one of the "Lena Baskette Featurettes," directed by Marshall Stedman
19. Black Orchids (1917), feature melodrama, directed by Rex Ingram
20. Making Monkey Business (1917), Victor comedy, one reel, directed by Allen Curtis
21. The Lure of the Circus (1917), Bison two-reel comedy, directed by Henry McRae, alternate title The Life of the Circus
22. The Fatal Marriage (1918), Fox-Lehrman-Sunshine, directed by Henry Lehrman
23. The Lion's Claws (1918), adventure serial, episode 14 "Hell Let Loose"
24. Jazz Monkey (1919), two-reel comedy, directed by William S. Campbell, working title was And the Elephant Still Pursued Her
25. Monkey Stuff (1919), two-reel comedy, directed by William S. Campbell (BFI)
26. Looney Lions and Monkey Business (1919), two-reel comedy, produced by Vin Moore, costarring "the Century Lions"
27. It's a Bird (1919), L-KO, comedy
28. The Merry-Go-Round (1919), Fox Film Co.
29. Photoplay Magazine Screen Supplement, Issue 5: Roughhouse at the Universal Zoo (1919), newsreel
30. The Return of Tarzan aka The Revenge of Tarzan (1920), Numa Pictures feature, directed by Harry Revier
31. Upper Three and Lower Four (1920), five-reel comedy feature, directed by Al Santell (Note: Information on this film is unusually thin; however it was mentioned in the Literary Digest article and Exhibitor's World: "Al Santell, director of comedies at Universal, has just completed Upper Three and Lower Four, an elaborate production. Santell was seven weeks filming the picture and expects to spend two more weeks in the cutting.")
32. The Evil Eye (1920), horror serial starring boxer Benny Leonard
33. King of the Circus (1920), thriller serial, directed by J.P. McGowan
34. A Prohibition Monkey (1920), two-reel comedy, directed by William S. Campbell
35. A Wild Night (1920), two-reel comedy, directed by Al Santell
36. Screen Snapshots 1-11 (1920)
37. His Day of Rest (1920), one reel, adventure comedy
38. A Monkey Bell Hop (1921), Universal Jewel, two-reel comedy, directed by Harry Burns
39. A Monkey Hero (1921), two-reel comedy, directed by Harry Burns, working title A Monkey Fireman
40. A Monkey Movie Star (1921), two-reel comedy, directed by Harry Burns — Shot at the Universal City arena, said to be Joe Martin's "autobiography" and "show the simian star as he actually is, both before the camera and in the seclusion of his jungle bungalow." — "The picture shows the mode of life and the training of the famous orang-outang."
41. No Monkey Business (1921), one or two reels, directed by Al Russell
42. His Lady Friend (1921), two reels, directed by Vin Moore
43. Seven Years Bad Luck (1921), feature comedy with an extended sequence filmed at the Universal City Zoo; said to be Max Linder's best surviving film
44. The Adventures of Tarzan (1921), a 15-episode serial
45. Screen Snapshots 1-17 (1921), newsreel
46. Ready to Serve (1921), comedy starring Chester Conklin
47. A Monkey Schoolmaster (1922), two-reel comedy, directed by Harry Burns
48. Trifling Women (1922), feature melodrama
49. The Adventures of Robinson Crusoe (1922)
50. Merry-Go-Round (1923), romantic drama feature; producing prodigy Irving Thalberg oversaw the film
51. Hollywood (1923), Famous Players–Lasky, newsreel
52. Down in Jungle Town (1924), one-reel comedy, directed by Harry Burns and Curley Stecker
53. A White Wing Monkey (1924), one or two reel comedy, directed by Harry Burns and Curley Stecker
54. Life in Hollywood (1927), newsreel
