= Curley Stecker =

American animal trainer (1892–1924)

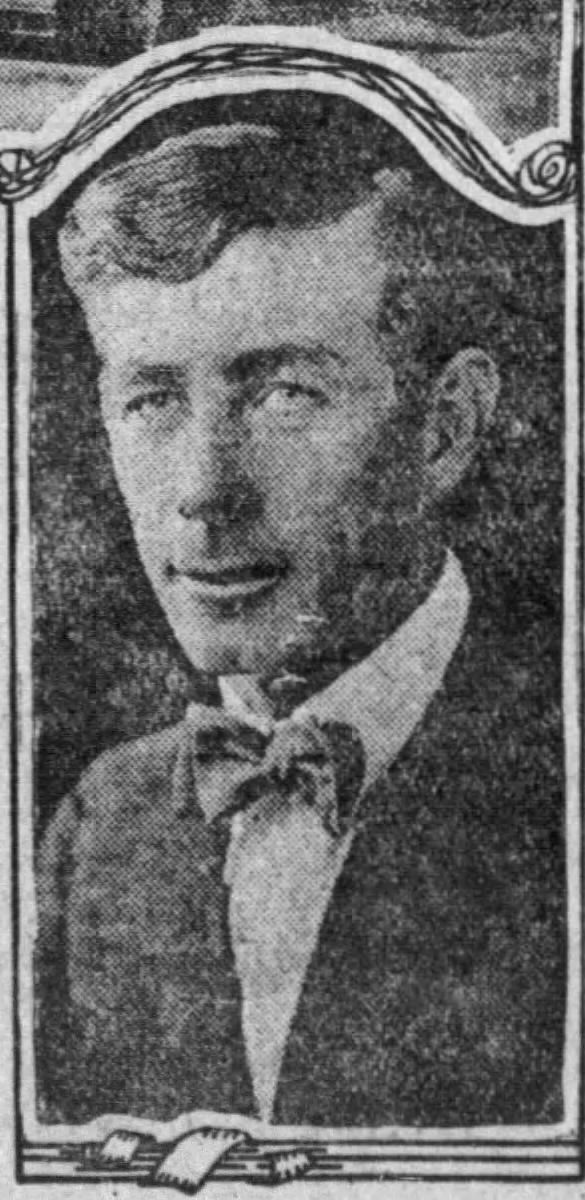
- Los Angeles Times, 1924
- Born: Algernon Maltby Stecker; July 10, 1892; Michigan
- Died: June 16, 1924 (aged 31); Hollywood, California
- Occupations: Animal trainer, zoo director, stuntman, film producer
- Years active: 1903–1923

Algernon Maltby "Curley" Stecker (July 10, 1892 – June 16, 1924) was an early Hollywood animal trainer, Universal City Zoo superintendent, animal-film producer, and occasional actor-stuntman.

Along with Charles Gay, Curley Stecker was one of the two main providers of lions for silent-era Hollywood films. Stecker was also the primary trainer of Joe Martin, Universal's star orangutan, eventually producing Joe Martin comedies alongside director Harry Burns. The near-fatal attack on him in 1923 by Charlie the Elephant, an animal he'd worked with for at least 10 years, made national headlines. In Natacha Rambova's 1926 memoir of her late ex-husband Rudolph Valentino, she wrote that one of their favorite activities was visiting with Curley Stecker at the Universal menagerie, where they would help care for the animals, and listen "for hours" to Stecker's "yarns and experiences. After a generous allowance of these tales of hairbreadth escapes, he would take us to visit our more particular animal friends."

== Biography ==
Algernon Maltby Stecker was born in the Copper Country of Michigan to George W. and Maria Jane Oughten Stecker. (Note: Stecker used his legal given name Algernon rarely, and his legal middle name Maltby even less often. Stecker usually substituted C. or S. as a middle initial and was credited variously as Curly, A.C., A.S., Stecher, or even Daredevil Stecker. Curley with a E seems to be the name he used most commonly in his lifetime, but instances abound of Curly with no E.) His mother died on Christmas Day when he was seven years old. In 1900, at age eight he was living with his uncle Seth W. Stecker. According to one newspaper source he was the stepson of actor and fellow animal trainer Rex de Rosselli. Still another said he was from a long line of animal trainers. In approximately 1903, Stecker ran away to join the circus. Technically it was a hypnotist he ran off with but nonetheless young Stecker then "drifted from one traveling show to another until he finally found his forte with the menagerie of a circus. When it was learned he could manage wild animals his fortune was made." Another report stated, "Mr. Stecker has been training animals since he was 11 years old. He was following a circus, toting water to the animals, and the first animal that responded to his training was an elephant."

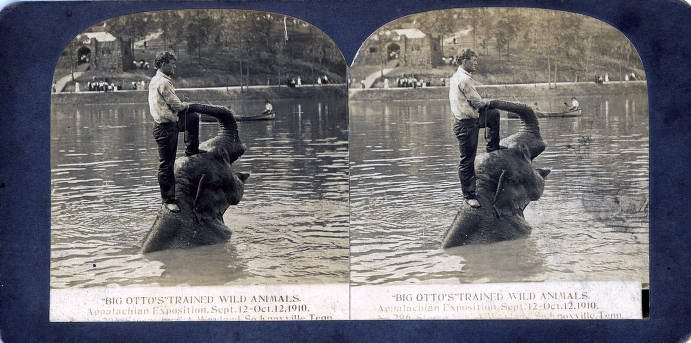
"Elephant in lake with Curley Stecker," Big Otto's Trained Wild Animals, Appalachian Exposition (1910)

Stecker apparently worked for Barnum & Bailey Circus, Forepaugh Circus, and Ringlings. Curley Stecker appears with an unidentified elephant in a stereoscopic view taken at the Appalachian Exposition in 1910; at the time he was apparently associated with "Big Otto's Trained Wild Animals." In 1911 he was with the Greater United Shows working as a wild animal trainer. According to a newspaper report, "In 1911, Stecker was in Jacksonville, Fla. with Col. W. N. Selig producing the first animal cinema ever made for the screen. Kathlyn Williams was being starred." While standing in as Williams' stunt double, Stecker was mauled by a tiger that bit into his shoulder, clawed his chest and tore off a chunk of flesh. A doctor visiting from New York performed a skin graft using a live chicken, connecting the chicken's blood vessels to Stecker. The chicken died after three days but Stecker survived the mauling and ensuing sepsis. During the same production there was apparently a small elephant stampede; Williams apparently felt that Curley Stecker was responsible for saving her and her male costar from being trampled. During his Selig era he appeared in Selig's 1913 animal film Terror of the Jungle as "Nig." He appeared in full-body blackface to play the part, in which his character plays into the "faithful retainer" stereotype of African-Americans when the character stays behind to protect his mistress.

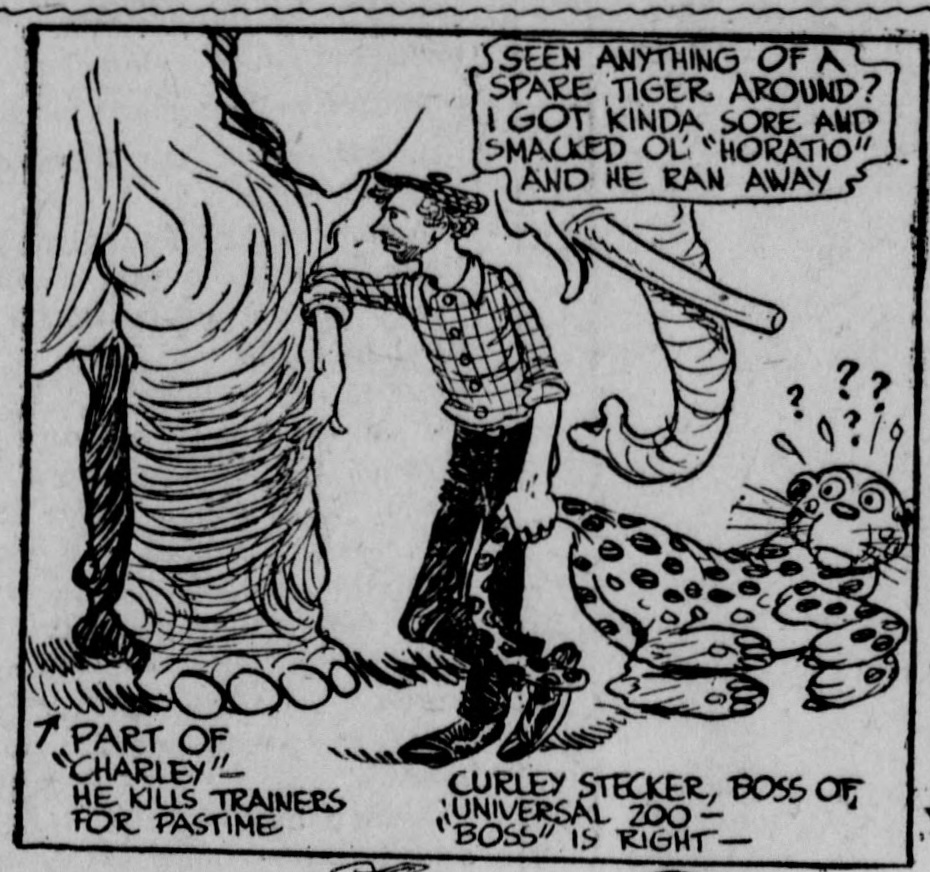
Part of a cartoon by Wyn Barden about Universal City, published in the Los Angeles Herald in August 1919

Curley may have been at Universal as early as 1913, as it was reported that he and Charlie hauled the first loads of lumber that built Universal City. There is a photo in the Los Angeles-centric Security Pacific National Bank Collection wherein "an elephant named 'Old Charlie' is pulling a wagon as men clear brush from a hillside near a road in April 1914." In 1915 Stecker was part of a film crew headed by director Harry McRae that filmed on the wreck of the Aggi Nord, a ship that had run aground on the Santa Barbara Islands.

Mr. McRae and the party in his boat, comprising Allan Watt, assistant director of the Bison Company; Don Meaney; and Curley Stecker, were washed out of reach of the others and drifted to a coral reef about a half mile away where they were forced to land and bail out their boat. It was two days later before they were able to beat their way back against wind and waves to the wreck.

In July 1916, when Universal City Zoo director and animal trainer Rex De Rosselli, also an actor, was cast in the lead of "a series of mountain pictures directed by George Cochrane," Curley Stecker was put in charge of the zoo. Stecker did stunt work in His Master's Wife (1917), directed by Harry McRae, wherein a lion jumped on his back. In October 1917 Stecker married a 25-year-old vaudeville actress named Ethel L. Spurgin Schroeder, the mother of his one-year-old son Roy. When filling out draft cards that year, Stecker reported that had a past broken kneecap but it hadn't bothered him the last two years. Stecker was at the zoo almost continuously from then until 1923, and in 1920 was living across the road from the animals in a rental house two doors down from his brother Carl Stecker, who also worked as an animal trainer for Universal and other studios. Curley's wife, and Carl and Curley's young children, would eventually appear alongside Joe Martin or in small parts in other films.

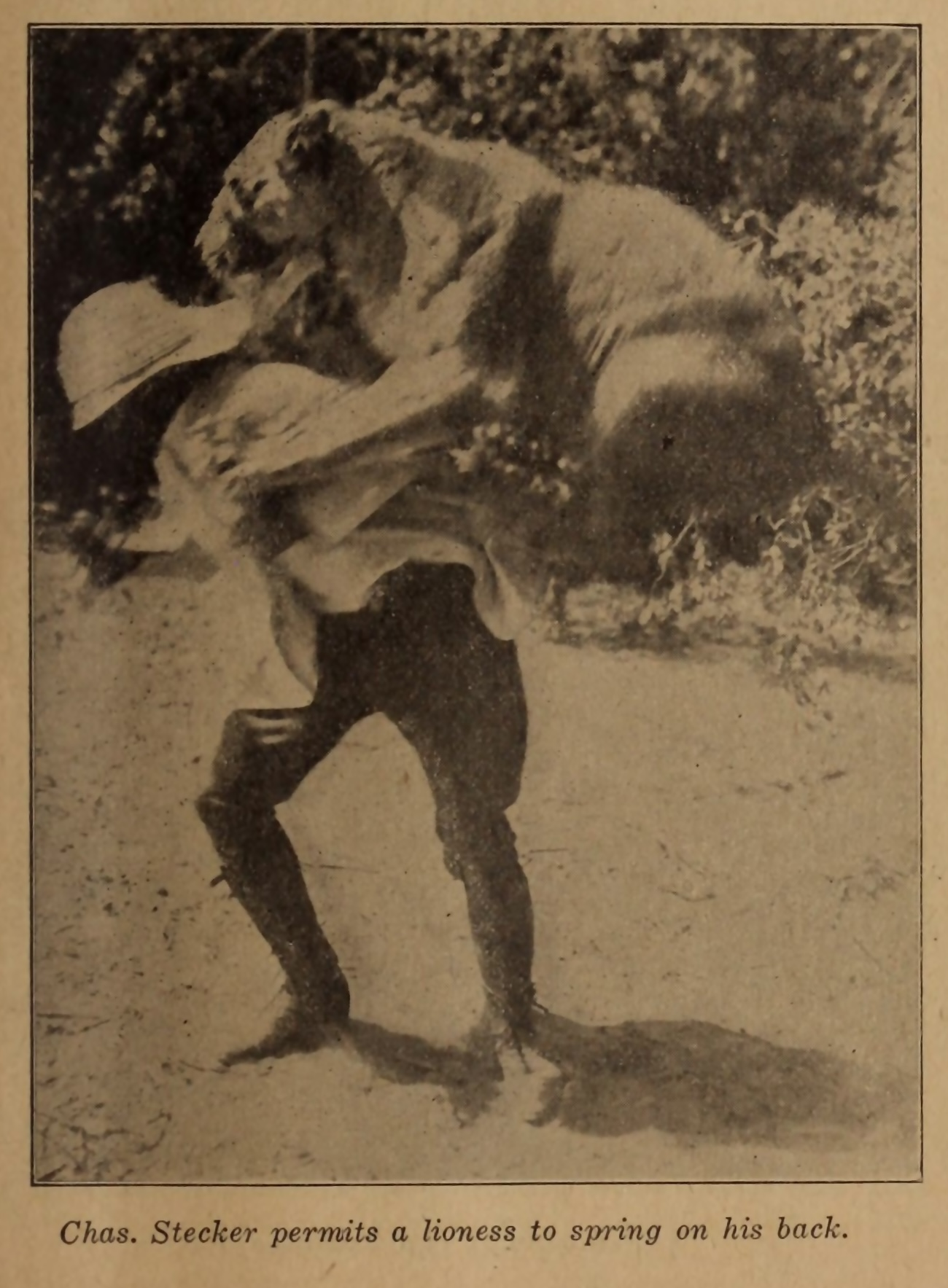
A lion leaps on Curley Stecker's back for a scene in Harry McRae's 1917 His Master's Wife

In January 1919 it was reported that Stecker has been working on "aviation serials" recently "but after having two bad falls...he came back to the lions for a quiet life." Stecker lost part of a finger—the little finger of the left hand was off at the knuckle—in 1921 in an accident while shooting a lion scene on Terror Trail! with Eileen Sedgwick. Also in 1921 he had a credited on-screen part in the lion-tamer romance The Man Tamer (1921) starring Gladys Walton, alongside past and future Universal City Zoo superintendents Rex De Rosselli and Charles B. Murphy. In 1922 he was mauled by a lioness named Ethel. It may have been on this occasion that "boy wonder" producer Irving Thalberg, who sometimes demonstrated a "lack of sensitivity to other people's problems...went to the hospital and lectured Stecker on the proper way to take care of wild animals."

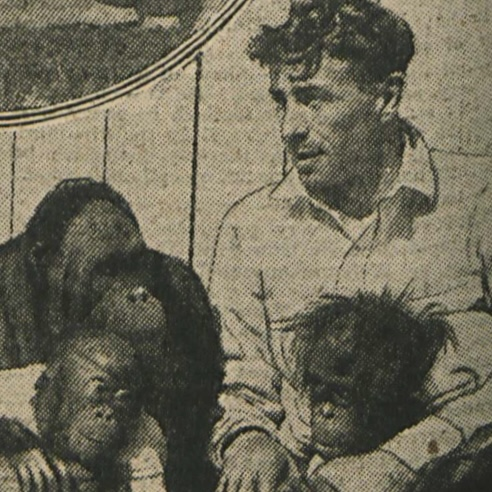
Joe Martin (orangutan), Curley Stecker, and orangutan babies newly arrived at the zoo in 1921

In 1923, Stecker was attacked and nearly killed by Charlie the elephant. The attack took place during a break in shooting the genie-in-a-bottle film The Brass Bottle, directed by Maurice Tourneur. Charlie had spent the day leading a parade of camels and donkeys down a London street set—"the elephant had been painted white and loaded with gorgeous East Indian trappings for the scene and it is believed this may have angered him." Charlie wrapped his trunk around Stecker, pulled Stecker's head in his mouth and was trying to kneel on him. Stecker's older brother Carl Stecker and another man, carpenter A. H. Kuhlman, together using some combination of pitchfork, spear, club or "a piece of concrete," fended off Charlie long enough for Curley to survive the initial attack. The collapse of the elaborate howdah on his back also distracted and "hampered" Charlie as it crashed down around him. Stecker suffered lacerations, contusions, "three double-fractured ribs", and a concussion.

Curly told the Associated Press he thought it was a case of "mistaken identity" in which Charlie thought he was Carl (whom Charlie hated), because Curly was wearing a business outfit instead of his usual animal-trainer outfit, and Carl was wearing an old outfit of Curly’s. "Charlie started picking up rocks with his trunk and throwing them at the horses. I told him to stop. He paid no attention. I jumped at him with a sharp command—and he did the rest. He thought I, in my business clothes, was my brother, and my brother 50 feet away in the clothes familiar to Charlie was 'the master.'" Stecker seems to have been able to come back to work for a time, doing at least one interview at the zoo in July 1923. Charlie was executed for the "rampage”; Stecker was apparently "stubbornly opposed" to the death sentence.

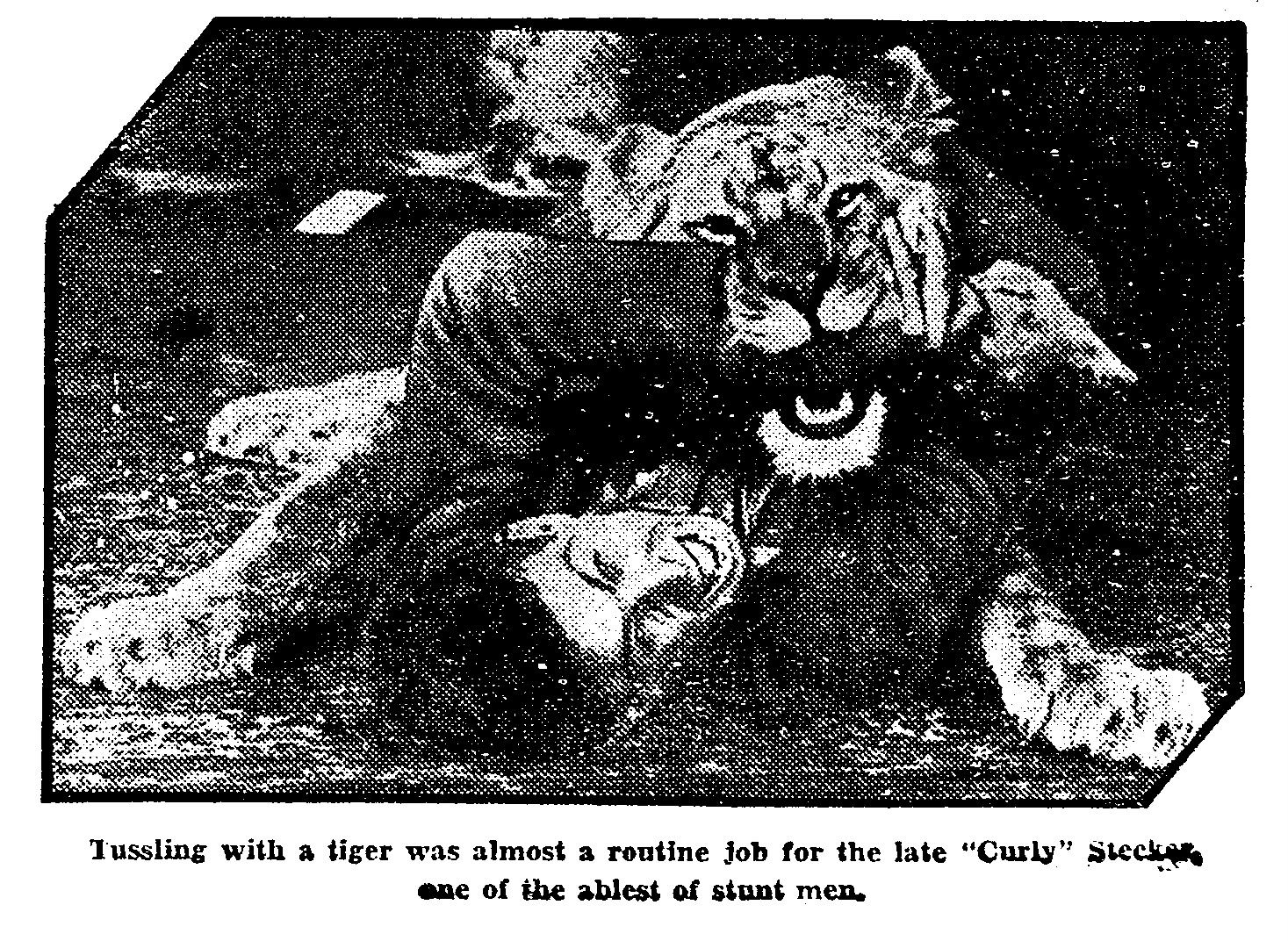
Bob Rose shared this photo of Stecker in a syndicated article about the history of Hollywood stunt work; Rose wrote that "a mean elephant trampled Curley Stecker to death out of revenge."

Stecker died a year later from leukemia with a contributing factor of "wild animal injury." An obituary in Exhibitors Herald related "The famous handler of beasts passed away at his home in Lankershim last week as the result of injuries received about a year ago when Charlie, a trained elephant owned by Universal, turned on his master and mauled him severely. As a result of this incident, Charlie was executed and Curley was persuaded to give up his hazardous work. Since that time he has been assisting his brother in the conduct of an animal ranch in Lankershim. Besides Charlie, Stecker trained Joe Martin, the famous ape, Ethel, the educated lioness and other four-footed screen stars. He is survived by a wife and three children." The funeral was held at Leroy Bagley Chapel at Hollywood and Western on June 19, 1924. Curly's brother Carl Stecker continued as an animal trainer, working with camels and dogs, well into the 1930s. Stecker had named his daughter Marie, born in 1920, after actress Marie Walcamp, who had starred in several Universal animal pictures.
