= A Desperate Adventure =

A Desperate Adventure may refer to:

- A Desperate Adventure (1924 film)
- A Desperate Adventure (1938 film)
