= Liberty (serial) =

1916 film

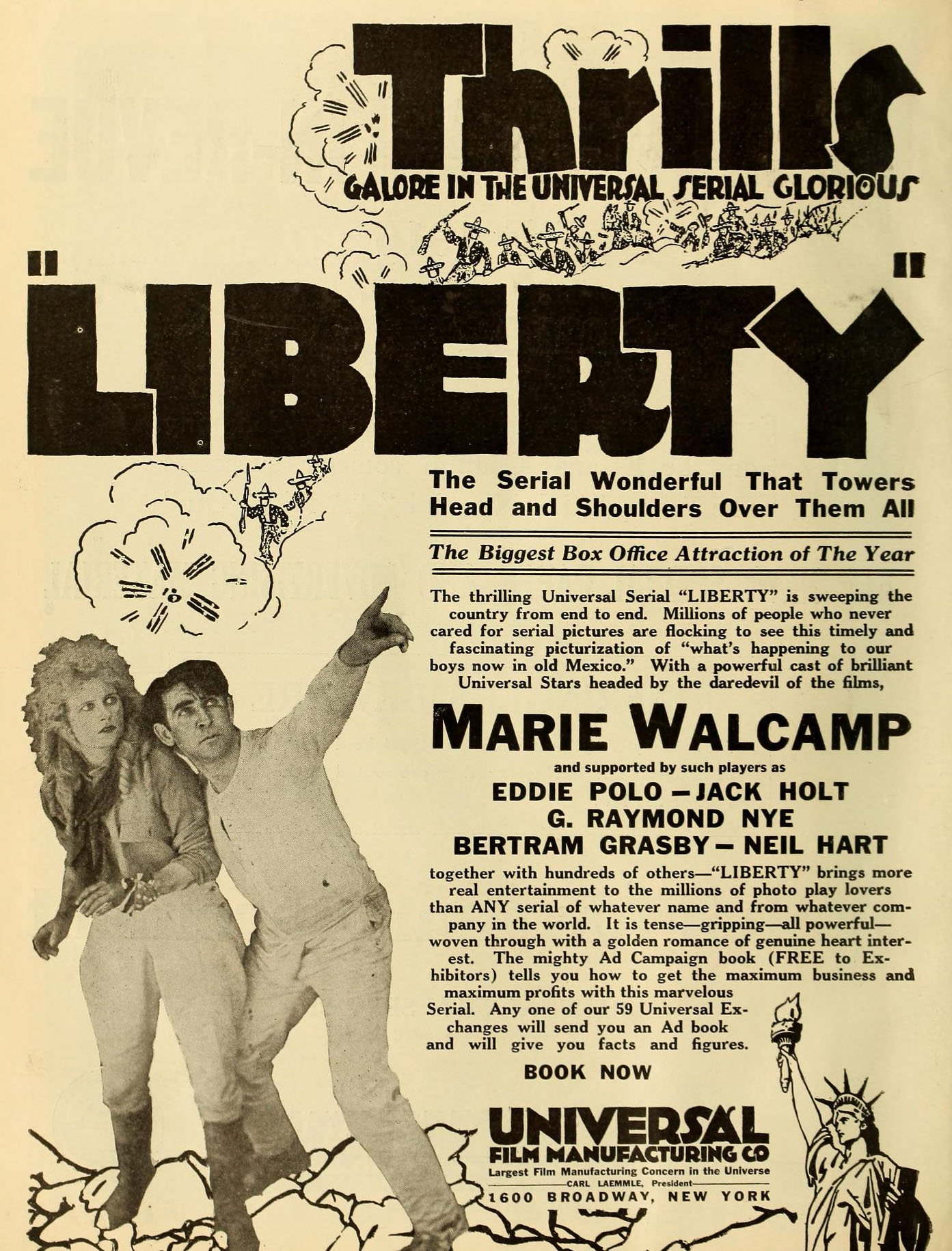
- Film poster
- Directed by: Jacques Jaccard; Henry MacRae
- Written by: Jacques Jaccard; W.B. Pearson
- Produced by: Jacques Jaccard
- Starring: Marie Walcamp; Jack Holt
- Distributed by: Universal Film Manufacturing Co.
- Release date: August 14, 1916
- Running time: 20 episodes
- Country: United States
- Languages: Silent; English intertitles
- Budget: $65,000
- Box office: over $2 million

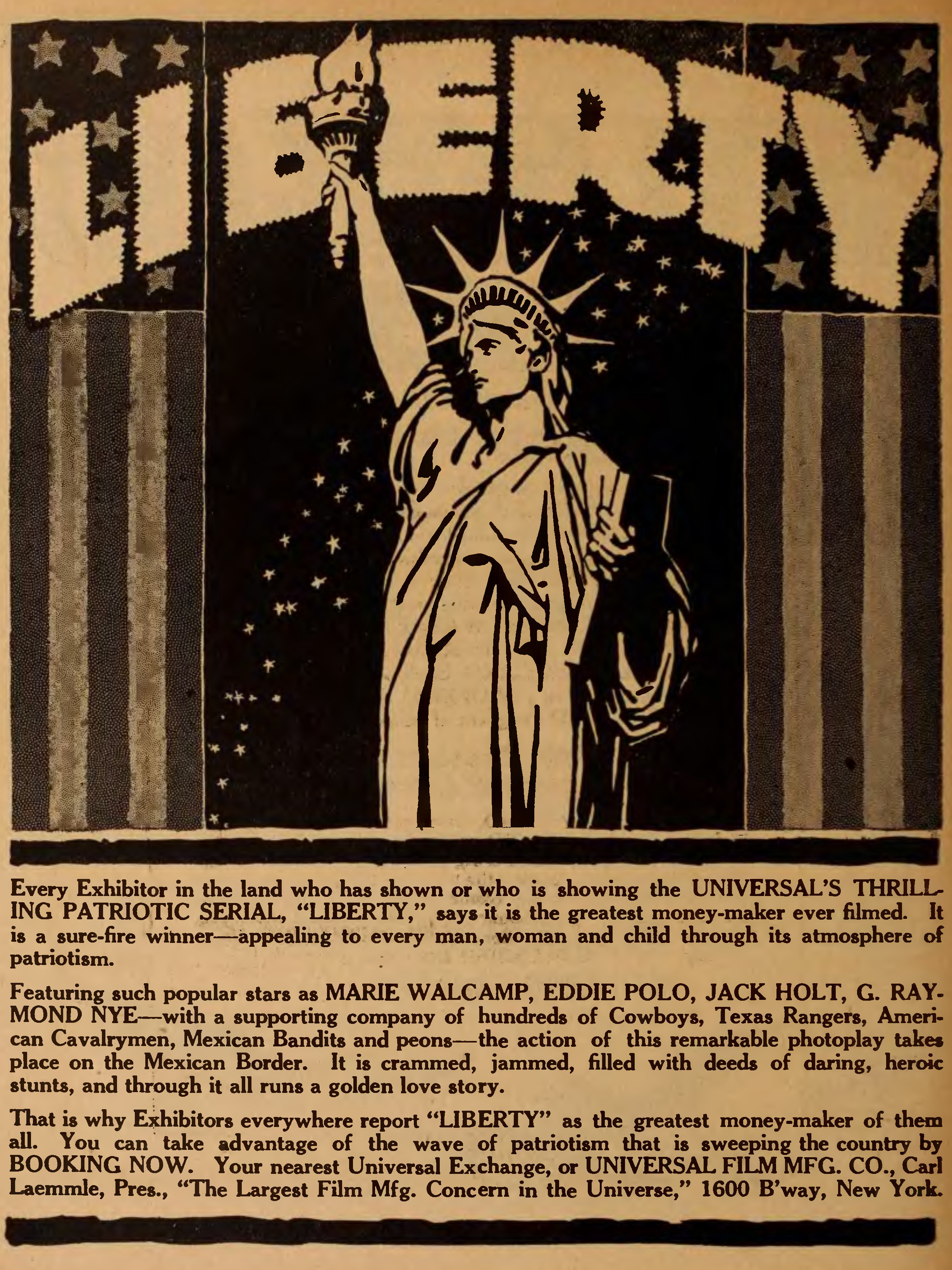
Movie ad from The Movie Picture Weekly

Liberty (also known as Liberty, A Daughter of the USA) is a 1916 American Western film serial directed by Jacques Jaccard and Henry MacRae, and was the first purely Western serial ever made. The film is now presumed to be lost. It is one of the most popular serials of all time.

== Plot ==
Liberty Horton, an American heiress, is kidnapped by a Mexican rebel and ransomed to fund his rebellion.

== Cast ==
- Marie Walcamp as Liberty Horton
- Jack Holt as Captain Rutledge
- Eddie Polo as Pedro
- G. Raymond Nye as Pancho Lopez
- Neal Hart as Captain Winston
- Bertram Grassby as Manuel Leon
- Maude Emory as Theresa
- L. M. Wells as Jose Leon
- Charles Brinley as Alvarez
- Tom London as (credited as Leonard Clapham)
- Roy Stewart
- Hazel Buckham

== Production ==
Liberty, a Daughter of the USA was the first purely Western serial, although Western elements were included in earlier serials such as The Perils of Pauline (1914). A print of Liberty was one of the primary footage sources used for the compilation film The Revenge of Pancho Villa (1930–36).

== See also ==
- List of film serials
- List of film serials by studio
- List of lost films
