= Joe Martin Turns 'Em Loose =

1915 Universal animal comedy short

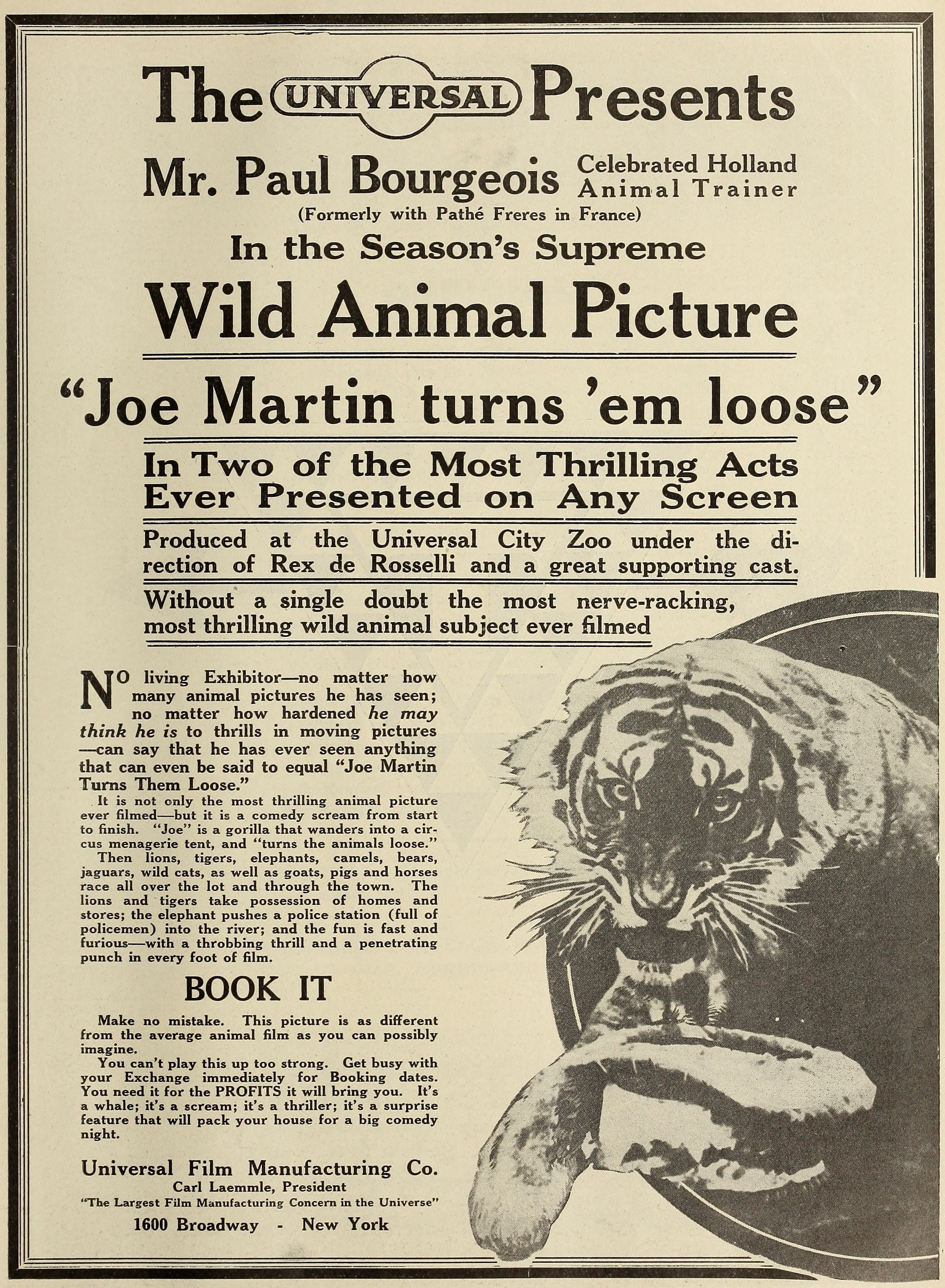
- Directed by: Paul Bourgeois
- Written by: Paul Bourgeois
- Produced by: Carl Laemmle
- Starring: Joe Martin (orangutan)
- Release date: September 15, 1915
- Running time: 30 minutes
- Country: United States
- Language: English

Joe Martin Turns 'Em Loose is a two-reel black-and-white silent comedy film released by Universal Pictures on September 15, 1915. It is not found in the Library of Congress' film preservation database and as such, is believed to be a lost film. The film was regarded by contemporary reviewers as a remarkable for its integration of plot, animal performance and stuntwork. The film's animals were the trained tigers of Paul Bourgeois (aka Paul Sablon) paired with the menagerie of the recently established Universal City Zoo, under the leadership of Rex De Rosselli. Bourgeois was the director and scenarist.

== Production ==
The film, distributed by Universal, is credited, variously, to one of two production companies under the Universal umbrella: Rex Motion Picture Company or Victor Studios. Some sources say it was a one-reel film but with a reported running time of 30 minutes that is likely an error.

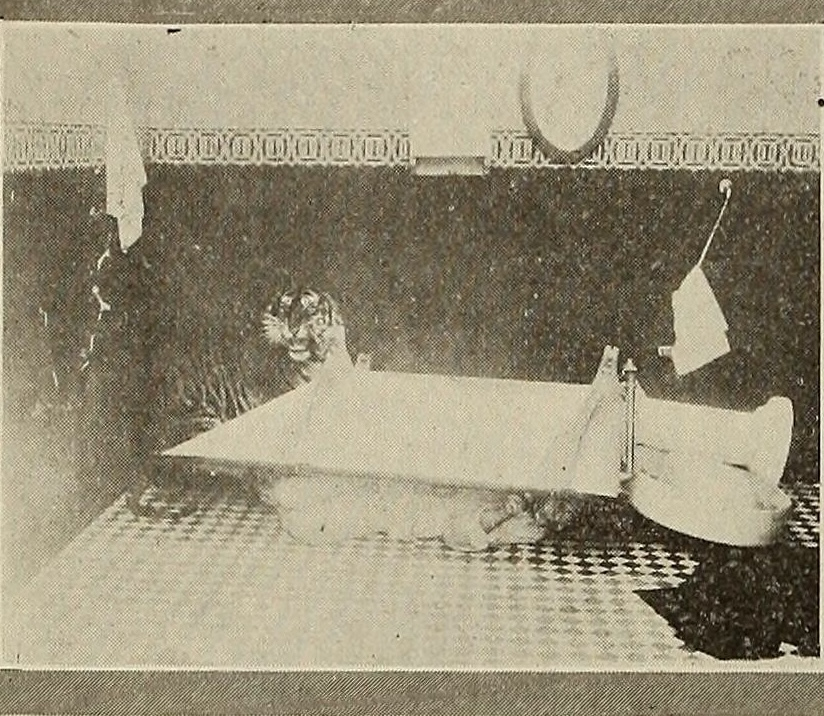
Bathroom tiger from Joe Martin Turns 'Em Loose

During production in August 1915, Motion Picture News reported, "A near riot was caused on the rear stage and in the zoo of Universal City the early part of this week when practically all of the animals were turned loose for the filming of the one-reel animal comedy, Joe Martin Turns 'em Loose. The name part is taken by the chimpanzee…" The animal cast included the "least domesticated members" of the Universal City Zoo, including Charlie the Elephant and Princess the Tiger.

Ad copy published in The Moving Picture World reads, in part, "It isn't often that Universal 'turns loose' to the extent of a page to boost a two-reeler—you can judge from this spread that we think mighty well of Joe Martin."

== Influence ==
The title-character ape was an orangutan who had been known as Charlie Chimpanzee but whose stage name was changed to Joe Martin, seemingly as a result of the success of this picture. Joe Martin went on to have a long movie career, appearing in films until 1923. "Joe Martin" became a cultural shorthand and common name for other performing simians of the era.

Carl Laemmle was seemingly proud of his involvement in Joe Martin, such that the studio magazine reported in 1933: "Joe Martin was a monkey and he scored heavily with audiences — so heavily, in fact, that Mr. Laemme recently decided to inject a new 1933 version of the same idea in Nagana." In the case of Nagana starring Melvyn Douglas, the animals collectively save a human life.

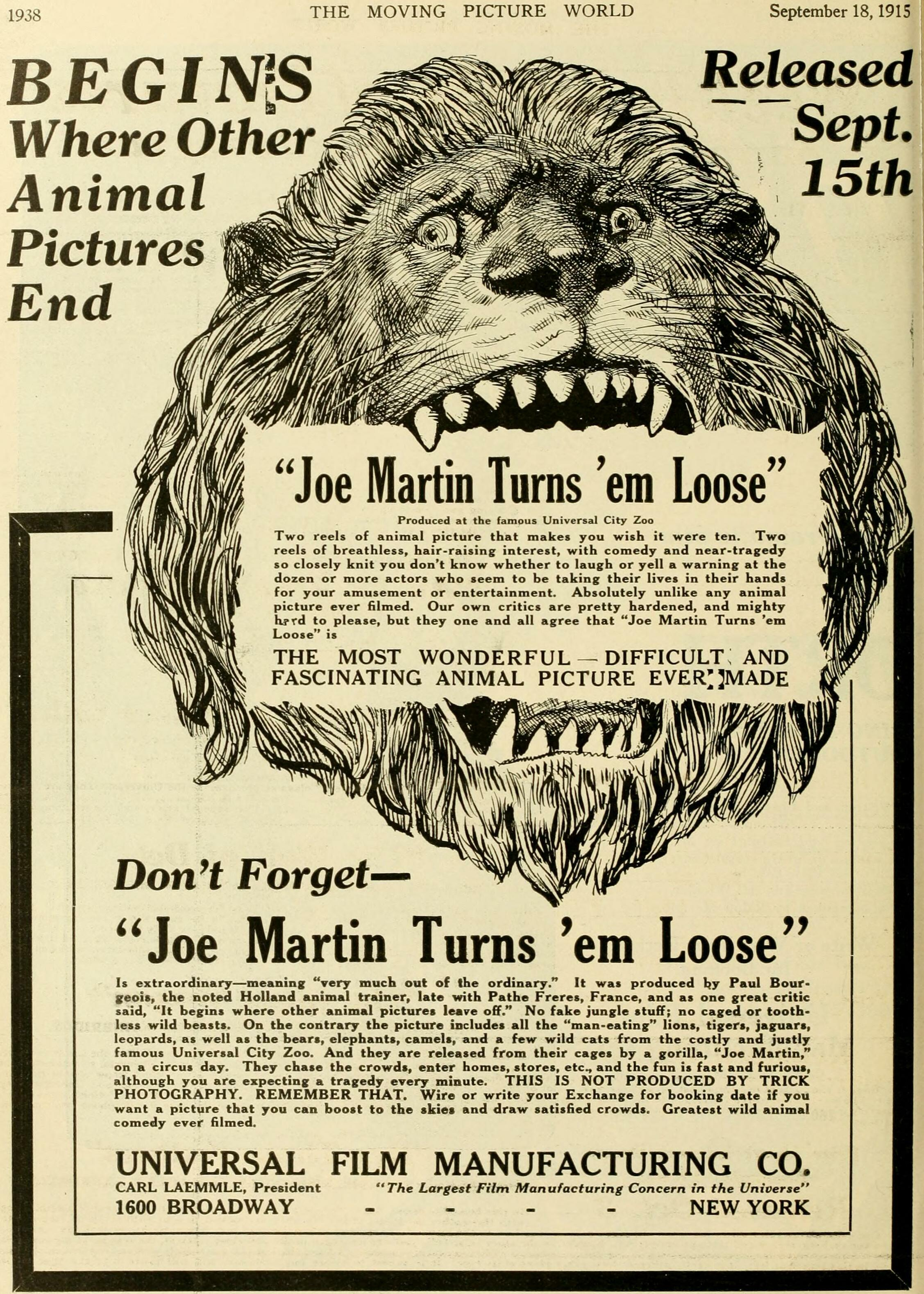
Joe Martin Turns 'Em Loose movie-magazine ad

Joe Martin, ničema was played at the 1920 inauguration of "The People's House (Czechia), the center of the Czech Social Democratic Party."

== Reception ==
In a 2001 article about the scandalous and somewhat criminal Hollywood era of Paul Bourgeois' career, the film was characterized as "riotous."

A positive review by Peter Milne was published in Motion Picture News at the time of release: "...An elephant shoves the police station in the river, tigers enter a millinery establishment and completely devastate its contents as well as petrifying the occupants, several bears wreck a delicatessen store, an entire boarding house is thrown into pandemonium by the unheralded entrance of all varieties of animals. All this and a lot more that is both thrilling and funny…"

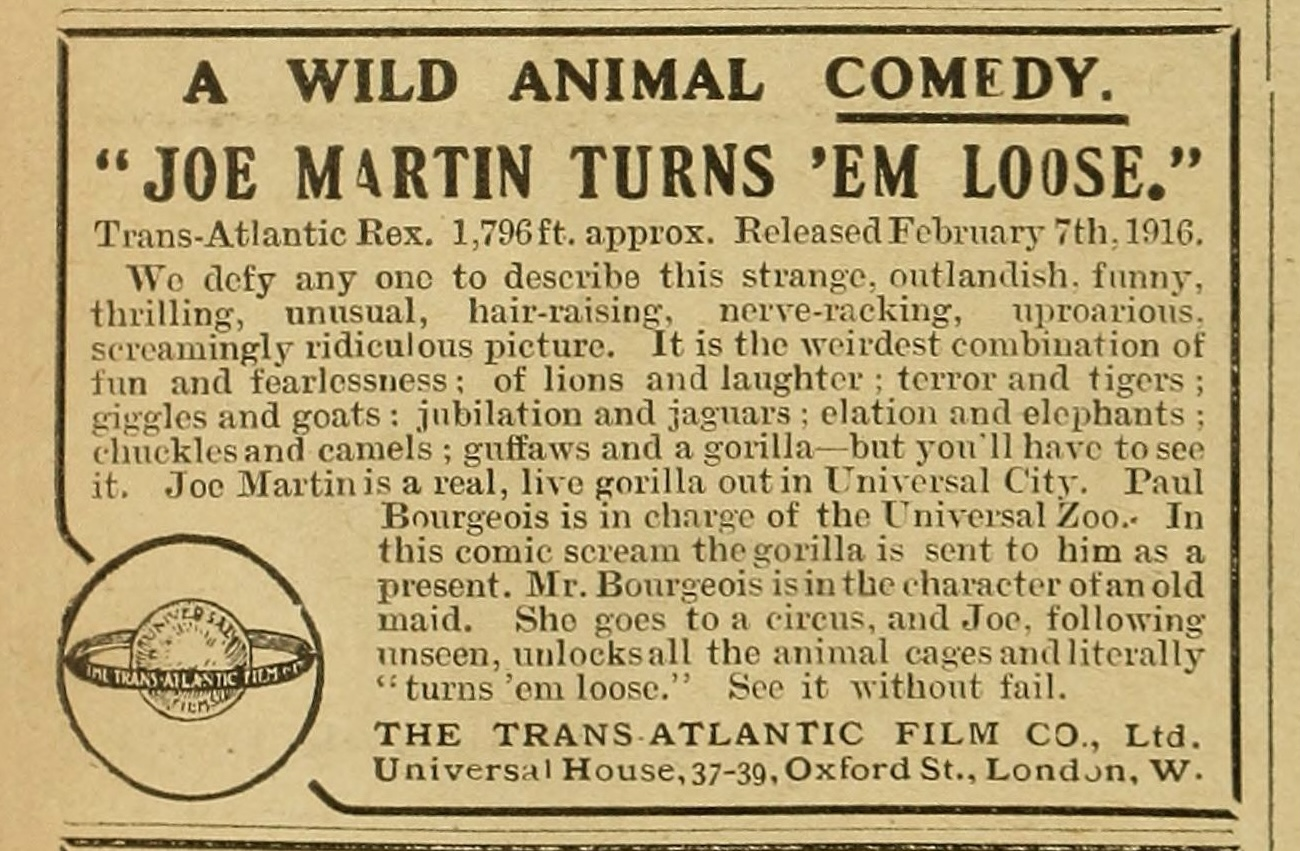
Joe Martin Turns 'Em Loose British release, 1916

== Synopsis ==
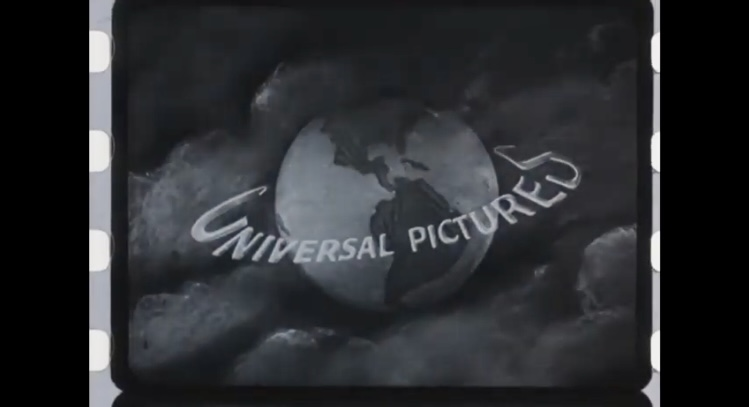
Universal Pictures skywriting/planet ring logo used in 1915

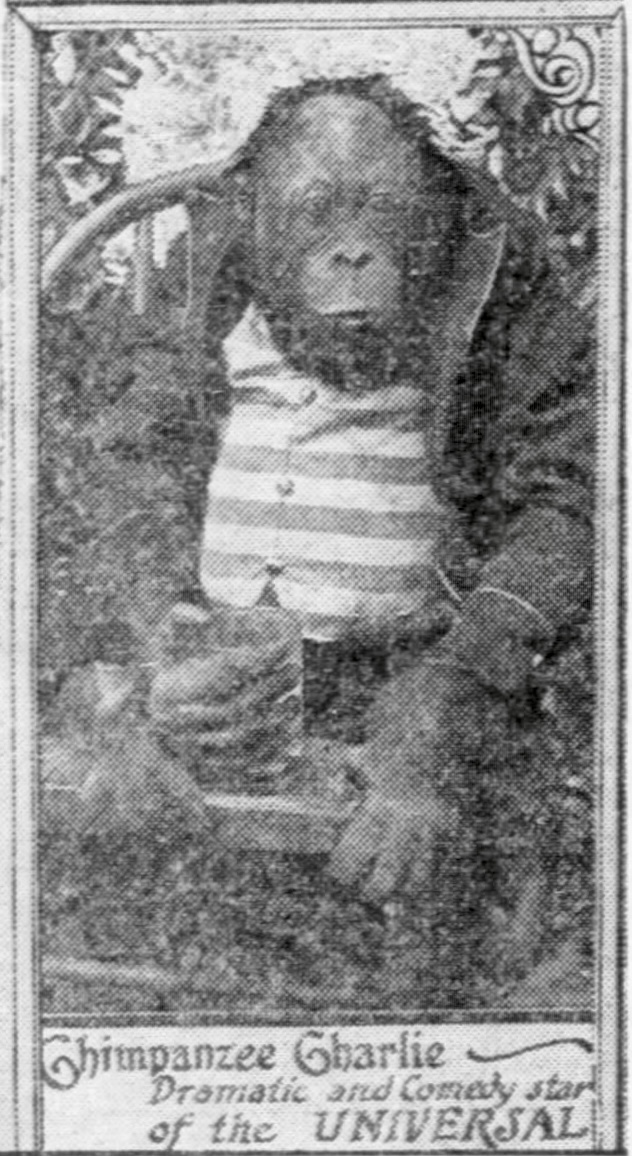
"Chimpanzee Charlie"

JOE MARTIN TURNS THEM LOOSE (Two parts — Sept. 15). — An old maid receives a telegram from the administrator of a distant uncle's will, stating that he is shipping her share of the inheritance. When the box arrives, the old maid discovers it contains an orangutan, who escapes from the box and causes her no end of trouble when she tries to inveigle him to re-enter his prison.

In the apartment next door, a musician persists in torturing a trombone, to the exasperation of the old maid, who vainly tries to persuade him to cease his efforts. He, however, slams the door in her face. When she returns to her apartment, she finds that the ape has again escaped from the box and is roaming around the room, doing what damage he can. Her attention is again called to the musician, who resumes practicing the trombone. The orang makes his escape via a window and heads down the street. He arrives at a circus tent, enters the menagerie tent, and proceeds to release all the animals. The elephants and camels are stampeded; and the lions, tigers, leopards, pumas, and other animals, proceed to make for freedom.

Many exciting scenes follow, in which the animals terrorize the neighborhood. They are finally all captured by the keepers from the circus. The old maid and the musician make up their differences; and, going after the truant orangutan, find him eating fruit at a fruit stand. He is vengefully borne homeward and confined with no chance of escape, while the romance of the old maid and the musician ripens into love.

== See also ==
- An Elephant on His Hands (1913)
