= Hey There! =

1918 film

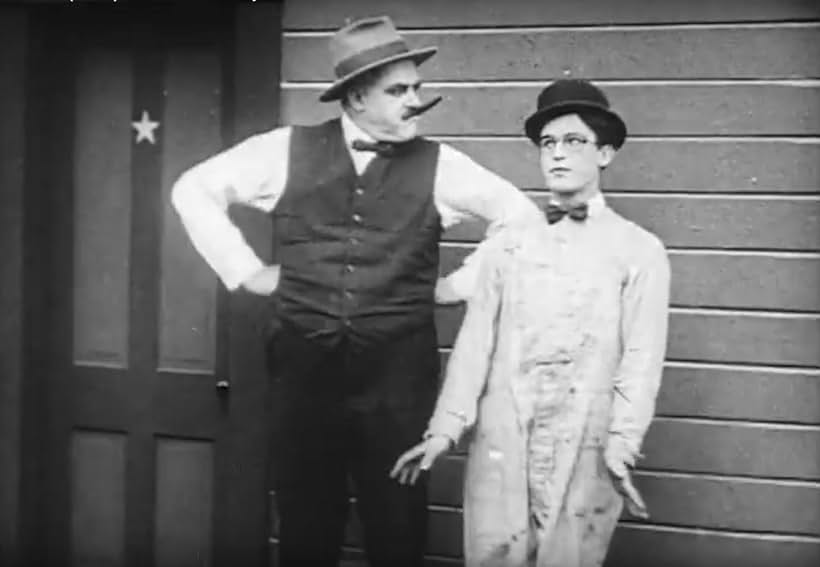
- Film still
- Directed by: Alfred J. Goulding
- Produced by: Hal Roach
- Starring: Harold Lloyd
- Production company: Rolin Film Company
- Distributed by: Pathé Exchange
- Release date: April 28, 1918
- Running time: 1 reel
- Country: United States
- Language: Silent (English intertitles)

Hey There! is a 1918 American short comedy film featuring Harold Lloyd. Like many American films of the time, Hey There! was subject to cuts by city and state film censorship boards. For example, the Chicago Board of Censors required cuts of the man standing on his head to look at a woman's legs and the scene with a fat woman with her kimono lowered from her shoulders.

== Plot ==
While buying a snack at a concession stand, Harold encounters a pretty girl (Bebe). Harold is smitten with her. While the oblivious Bebe is walking to her waiting car, she accidentally drops a letter. Harold sees the letter fall, picks it up, and tries to return it to her. However, Bebe has already shut the car door and the vehicle begins to drive away. Harold latches on to the outside of the car which goes to a movie studio where the girl is employed as an actress. Harold, with some difficulty, manages to sneak into the studio among a group of male extras. Harold is mistaken for a stage hand and causes considerable damage to some props. He also accidentally disrupts the scenes being shot on several sets. Just as Harold is about to be chased from the studio, he sees Bebe and returns the letter to her. He drops to his knees to propose to her, but the letter to Bebe is a love missive from her beau. Chagrined, Harold scurries out of the studio still in a kneeling position.

== Cast ==
- Harold Lloyd
- Snub Pollard
- Bebe Daniels
- William Blaisdell
- Sammy Brooks
- Harry Clifton
- Lige Conley (credited as Lige Cromley)
- Billy Fay
- William Gillespie
- Helen Gilmore
- June Havoc as Child (credited as June Hovick)
- James Parrott
- Charles Stevenson
- Dorothea Wolbert

== See also ==
- Harold Lloyd filmography
