= A Desperate Adventure (1924 film) =

1924 film directed by J. P. McGowan

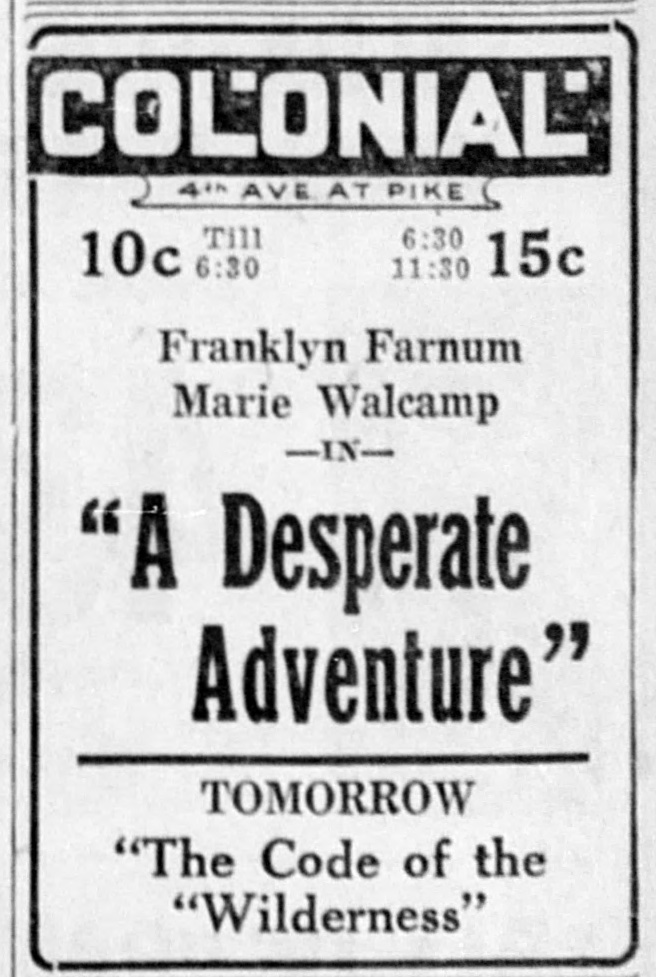
- Contemporary advertisement
- Directed by: J. P. McGowan
- Written by: James Ormont
- Produced by: Jesse J. Goldburg
- Starring: Franklyn Farnum
- Cinematography: Walter Griffin (* Walter L. Griffin)
- Distributed by: Independent Pictures
- Release date: 1924
- Running time: 50 minutes
- Country: United States
- Languages: Silent; English intertitles

A Desperate Adventure is a 1924 American silent Western film directed by J. P. McGowan and starring Franklyn Farnum, Marie Walcamp, and Priscilla Bonner.

A nitrate print is preserved in the Library of Congress collection.

== Plot summary ==
A Secret Service agent is running down a band of smugglers known as "The Black Pete Gang".

== Cast ==
- Franklyn Farnum
- Marie Walcamp
- Priscilla Bonner

== Production ==
Director J. P. McGowan had a reputation for being able to work with temperamental stars. Marie Walcamp had previously worked with McGowan on two short films in 1915, and the 18-chapter serial film The Red Glove in 1919. A Desperate Adventure was one of two Westerns she worked on for McGowan in 1924, the second being Western Vengeance.

== Release ==
The film was released on June 20, or September 29, 1924.
