= Breitkreutz =

Breitkreutz is a surname of German origin. Breitkreutz translates to broad cross. Notable people with the surname include:

- Emil Breitkreutz (1883–1972), American middle-distance runner
- Matthias Breitkreutz (born 1971), German footballer
- Otto F. Breitkreutz (~1866–1928), known as Big Otto, American circus owner

== See also ==
- Patrick Breitkreuz, German footballer
