= Harry Clifton (actor) =

American actor

Harry Clifton was an actor in silent movies in the USA from 1908 to 1919, not to be confused with the producer of the same name.

== Career ==
IMDB lists one Harry Clifton as both an actor and a producer, but this is a conflation: the productions belong to a different Harry Clifton. His first film as an actor was the 1908 version of the tale of the Younger brothers. Several other acting roles are credited to Harry Clifton up to 1919, including his best known film Man and Beast (1917) where he played the lead, and Hey There! in which he appeared with Harold Lloyd. His final two films were Just Rambling Along and Hoot Mon! in both of which he appeared with Stan Laurel.

== Filmography ==
- The Younger Brothers (1908)
- Man and Beast (1917)
- Hey There! (1918)
- Just Rambling Along (1918)
- Hoot Mon! (1919 film)
