= Hazel Buckham =

American actress

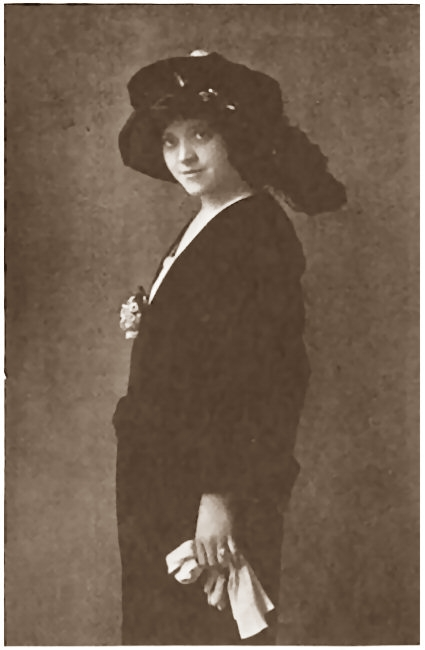
- Who’s Who in the Film World, 1914
- Born: December 27, 1888; Minneapolis Minnesota, US
- Died: September 4, 1959 (aged 70); Los Angeles, California, US
- Other name: Hazel Buckham King
- Occupation: Actress
- Years active: 1912–1916
- Spouse: Joe King
- Children: 1

Hazel Buckham (December 27, 1888 – September 4, 1959) was an American stage and early silent film actress.

== Biography ==
Hazel Buckham was born on December 27, 1888, in Minneapolis, Minnesota, the only child of Adam and Ida Buckham. Her father was an electrician who had emigrated from Canada at an early age. He married Ida Cummins, a native of New York, in 1886 and by 1910 the two along with their daughter had relocated to Los Angeles.

She began her acting career with the Ferris Stock Company in road productions that toured the American East Coast. While engaged at New York’s Morosco Theatre in 1912, Buckham was recruited by Biograph Studios to appear in films. She would go on to play in nearly forty motion pictures over the following few years with Biograph, American, Broncho, Kay-Bee, and Universal studios.

She was the wife of actor Joe King, and the mother of Joleen King, an actress who appeared in a handful of movies between 1939 and 1950. Buckham left acting not long after the birth of her daughter and remained in Los Angeles where she died on September 4, 1959, at the age of 70.

== Filmography ==
- His Squaw (1912)
- The Mosaic Law (1913)
- The Lost Dispatch (1913)
- The Sins of the Father (1913)
- A Southern Cinderella (1913)
- Bread Cast Upon the Waters (1913)
- A Wartime Mother's Sacrifice (1913)
- The Bondsman (1913)
- Exoneration (1913)
- The Open Door (1913)
- Eileen of Erin (1913)
- From Father to Son (1914)
- The Boob's Honeymoon (1914)
- Captain Jenny, S.A. (1914)
- For the Family Honor (1914)
- The House Across the Street (1914)
- The Senator's Bill (1914)
- In the Eye of the Law (1914)
- The Ruby Circle (1914)
- A Boob Incognito (1914)
- Mountain Law (1914)
- A Man, a Girl and Another Man (1914)
- Aurora of the North (1914)
- A Boob There Was (1914)
- The Fox (1914)
- Swede Larson (1914)
- The Awakening (1914)
- A Law Unto Himself (1914)
- The House Discordant (1914) Also known as His Father's Son (USA)
- The Weird Nemesis (1915)
- The Shriek in the Night (1915)
- A Life at Stake (1915)
- A White Feather Volunteer (1915)
- The Wanderers (1916)
- Liberty (1916) Also known as Liberty, A Daughter of the U.S.A. and The Fangs of a Wolf
