= The Ruby Circle (film) =

1914 silent film

- Directed by: Robert Z. Leonard
- Written by: Robert Z. Leonard
- Starring: Robert Z. Leonard; Hazel Buckham; Allan Forrest
- Production company: Universal Pictures
- Distributed by: Universal Pictures
- Release date: April 9, 1914
- Running time: 55 minutes
- Country: United States
- Languages: Silent; English intertitles

The Ruby Circle is a 1914 American silent drama film directed by Robert Z. Leonard starring Leonard, Hazel Buckham, and Allan Forrest.

== Cast ==
- Robert Z. Leonard as Robert Carlton
- Hazel Buckham as The Woman of Mystery
- Allan Forrest as Robert's Friend
- Harry Carter as The Conspirator
- Bruce Mitchell as Ivan - the Accomplice

== Bibliography ==
- Paul C. Spehr & Gunnar Lundquist. American Film Personnel and Company Credits, 1908-1920. McFarland, 1996.
