= Charlie (elephant) =

Silent-era American film performer

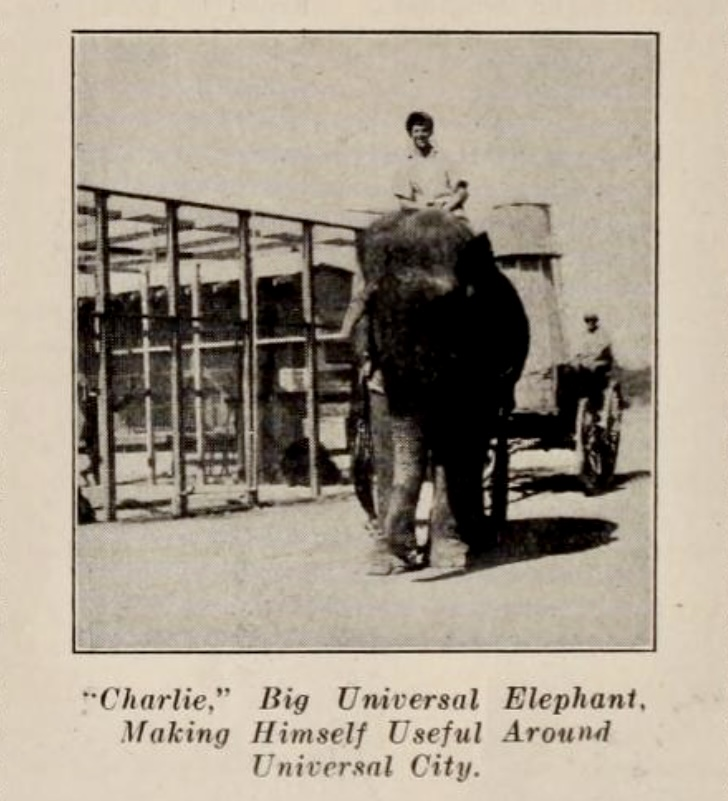
Charlie, c. 1920

Charlie, sometimes Charley or Old Charlie, (b. unknown, d. 1923) was an elephant who lived at the Universal City Zoo in Universal City, California, United States, from approximately 1914 to 1923 and appeared in scores of silent-era films. He was euthanized in approximately August 1923 for his attack on trainer Curley Stecker. Carl Laemmle, by wire from Europe, characterized the plan to end Charlie's life as an execution.

== Life and work ==
Apparently formerly known as Prince Rajah, Charlie the Elephant weighed just shy of five tons (4,500 kg). He may have been found hauling teakwood near Calcutta in 1889 or 1899 by a scout for Karl Hamburg and brought to the Berlin Zoo. Circus manager and actor Duke R. Lee then brought Charlie to the United States in 1902 or 1903. Animal collector Frank Buck claimed to have "brought him back from India," but Buck was known for telling falsehoods. A movie magazine stated in 1923 said that Charlie had been in the United States for 20 years.

His mate Susie had apparently been executed after a rampage in Raleigh, North Carolina. A 1904 rampage in San Francisco, California had apparently involved smashing five cars, drama at the ferry dock, and a "grand finale" in the water. He was struck by lightning around 1908 and was blind in his left eye as a consequence. Charlie and animal trainer Curley Stecker met doing circus work and took "about three years getting acquainted," until Stecker was the only human Charlie regularly tolerated.

He was supposedly brought to Universal City in 1913 by Curly Stecker with the "first load of lumber that built that city." Another source said he'd been with the studio since 1912. He consumed two 150 lb (68 kg) bales of hay each day. Charlie regularly escaped and wandered around the San Fernando Valley. In 1915, reportedly 30 men armed with rifles and a machine gun went after him. A different claim says that a lone man on horseback found him by the river. One afternoon in 1919, trainer George Englehardt returned him home safely. He was known to bull through the wall of the barn to escape; once he blacked out Universal City by knocking down the electric poles. In 1919 an editorial cartoon suggested that killing trainers was a "pastime" of Charlie's, and in 1920 it was reported that he had "killed several of his attendants during his life." According to a movie magazine, he was eventually condemned to death with the acquiescence of the Humane Society because, "On the average of about once a month, he breaks his chains and fares forth upon Los Angeles, just rarin’ to go...Movie sets, front porches, lamp posts, motor cars, trolley cars, and occasionally a dog, a horse or even a human" had been knocked about or crushed by Charlie.

Charlie and another Universal Zoo animal, an orangutan called Joe Martin, were both trained by and accompanied on film shoots by Curley Stecker. Orangutan and elephant appeared together in multiple comedies, features and adventure serials, including Man and Beast, The Revenge of Tarzan, and A Monkey Hero.

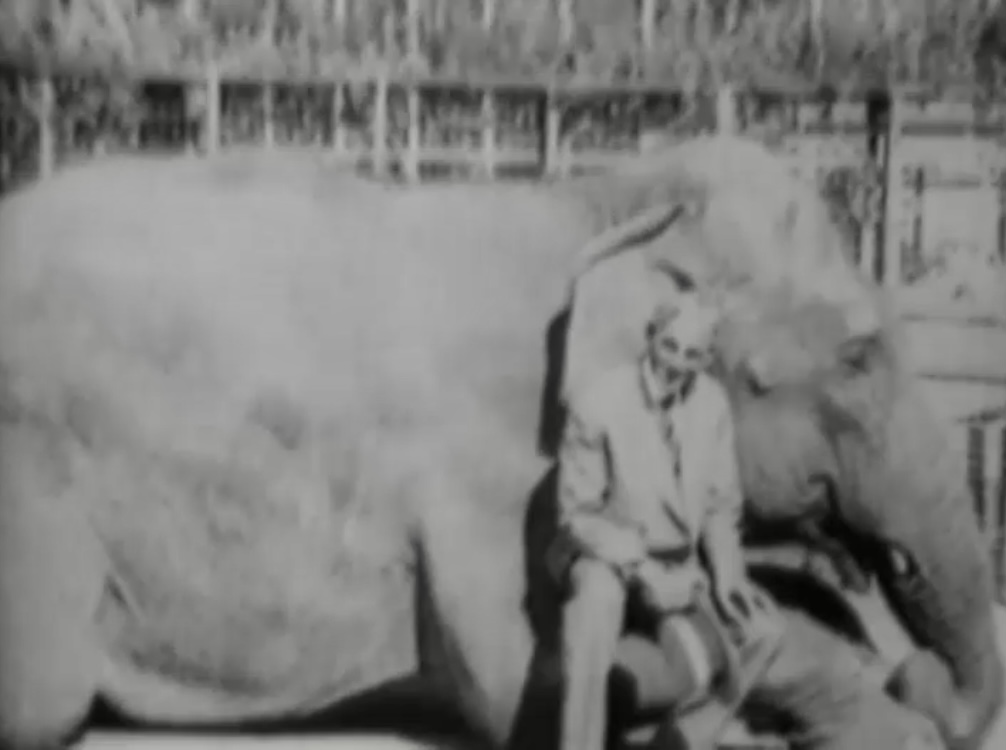
Henry Ford meets Charlie the Elephant at Universal City in 1916

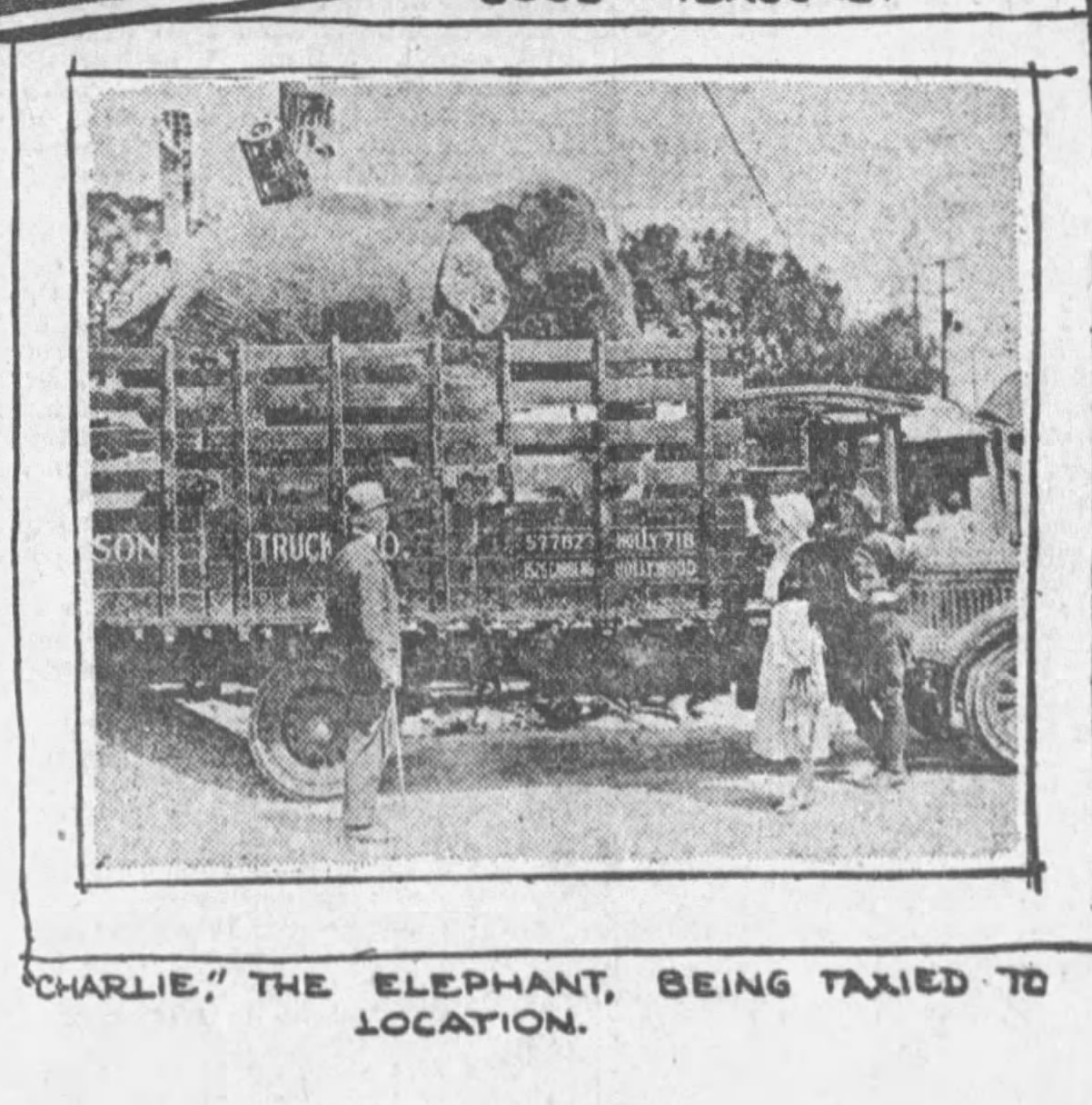
Los Angeles Times, 1922

== Trainer attack ==
In the early afternoon on Monday, April 24, 1923, at Universal City, while filming the genie-of-the-lamp movie The Brass Bottle, "during a parade sequence, veteran pachyderm-performer Charlie the Elephant, on loan from Universal, went berserk. As 300 extras scattered, Charlie turned on his trainer…picked him up and dashed him to the ground. As Charlie tried to kneel on Stecker to crush him, a stagehand struck the enraged elephant with a pitchfork, and the trainer was rescued." Another account stated that "as the sets were being shifted between scenes, the elephant without warning attacked his trainer, knocked him down his long trunk, reared down on his hind legs and brought his front feet down on Stecker’s body, dug at him with his tusks, and trampled him into the dust."

Stecker's older brother Carl Stecker (also an animal trainer) and A.H. Kuhlman, a carpenter, using either a pitchfork or "a piece of concrete", fended off Charlie long enough for Curley to survive the initial attack. Stecker suffered lacerations, contusions, rib fractures, and a concussion. Curly told the Associated Press, apparently from his hospital bed, that he thought it was a case of "mistaken identity" in which Charlie thought he was Carl (whom Charlie hated), because Curly was wearing a business outfit instead of his usual animal-trainer outfit, and Carl was wearing an old outfit of Curly's. "Charlie started picking up rocks with his trunk and throwing them at the horses. I told him to stop. He paid no attention. I jumped at him with a sharp command—and he did the rest. He thought I, in my business clothes, was my brother, and my brother 50 feet away in the clothes familiar to Charlie was 'the master.'"

Curly Stecker, released from hospital after three months, apparently pled for Charlie's life but to no avail.

== Death ==
Multiple newspaper articles from the second half of 1923 report on the studio's deliberations about Charlie the Elephant's fate. Several conferences were held between Julius Bernheim, general manager, Homer Boushey, general production manager, and William Koenig, business manager, about what to do about Charlie. Whether or not he would be euthanized was a decision reportedly made by Carl Laemmle himself—he apparently wired from Europe "Hate execution idea but if necessary go ahead"—and multiple methods of killing the animal were considered.

While there is debate about how Charlie was dispatched, and the preponderance of evidence points to garroting—although some sources do say the studio settled upon gunshot—no sources assert summary execution of an elephant worth thousands of dollars, as is suggested by the account of the incident in Diana Serra Cary's memoir. Charlie the Elephant was euthanized in autumn 1923 (most likely garroted by steel cables tightened by a windlass) but possibly by gunshot. One 1936 article said "two big trucks driving in opposite directions broke Charlie's neck."

Stecker died the following year from leukemia, with "wild animal injury" that occurred at Universal City listed as a complicating factor on his death certificate. (Note: Stecker's official cause of death was myelogenous leukemia diagnosed one year and two months prior to death with a contributory factor of "Wild animal injury - contusion & laceration body & head fracture 10th rib right side" dating from one year and three months prior to death. The contributory element took place at Universal City.) Charlie's skeleton was reportedly donated to the Los Angeles Museum of Natural History.

Charlie's execution triggered one of the first animal welfare campaigns focused on the American film industry; Laemmle personally managed the studio's response.

At the time of Charlie's execution in 1923, it was claimed that he had killed five people, had appeared in over 180 films, and was over 150 years old.

== See also ==
- Elephant execution in the United States
- Category:Executed elephants
