= Hoot Mon! =

1919 film

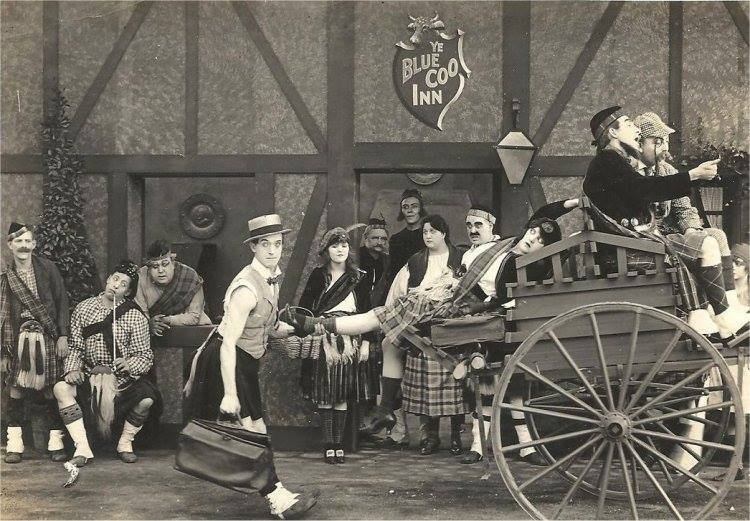
- Directed by: Hal Roach
- Produced by: Hal Roach
- Starring: Stan Laurel
- Cinematography: Robert Doran
- Edited by: Thomas J. Crizer
- Release date: March 1, 1919
- Country: United States
- Languages: Silent film English intertitles

Hoot Mon! is a 1919 American silent comedy film featuring Stan Laurel.

== Cast ==
- Bunny Bixby
- Harry Clifton
- Caroline Fowler
- Wallace Howe
- Bud Jamison
- Marie Joslyn
- Jerome Laplauch
- Stan Laurel
- Gus Leonard
- Belle Mitchell
- Marie Mosquini
- James Parrott
- William Petterson
- Lillian Rothchild
- Emmy Wallace
- Dorothea Wolbert
- Noah Young

== See also ==
- List of American films of 1919
