= Coral (film) =

1915 film

- Directed by: Henry MacRae
- Written by: Olga Printzlau
- Starring: Marie Walcamp; Wellington A. Playter; Ruby Cox
- Production company: Bison Motion Pictures
- Distributed by: Universal Pictures
- Release date: September 4, 1915
- Running time: 50 minutes
- Country: United States
- Languages: Silent; English intertitles

Coral is a 1915 American silent drama film directed by Henry MacRae and starring Marie Walcamp, Wellington A. Playter and Ruby Cox.

== Cast ==
- Marie Walcamp as Coral
- Wellington A. Playter as Philip Norton
- Ruby Cox as Helen Norton
- Rex De Rosselli as Dan McQuade
- Mr. Titus as Norton
- Sherman Bainbridge as Paul Dore
- Mrs. Wellington Playter as Janitor's Wife

== Bibliography ==
- Robert B. Connelly. The Silents: Silent Feature Films, 1910-36, Volume 40, Issue 2. December Press, 1998.
