= Charles Brinley =

American actor (1880–1946)

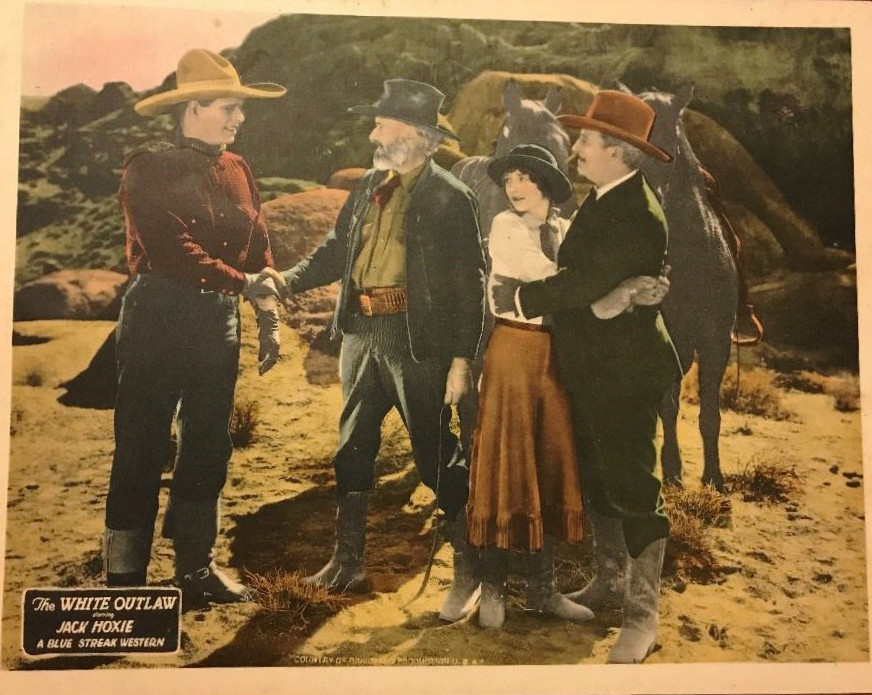
- Lobby card for The White Outlaw (1925) with Jack Hoxie, Charles Brinley, Marceline Day, and William Welsh
- Born: November 15, 1880; Yuma, Arizona, U.S.
- Died: February 17, 1946 (aged 65); Los Angeles, California, U.S.
- Occupation: Actor
- Years active: 1913-1939

Charles Brinley (November 15, 1880 – February 17, 1946) was an American actor of the silent era. He appeared in 140 films between 1913 and 1939. He was born in Yuma, Arizona and died in Los Angeles, California.

== Selected filmography ==
Year	Title	Role	Notes
1914	The Trey o' Hearts		
1916	Liberty	Alvarez	
1917	The Red Ace	Steele Heffern	
1918	The Lion's Claws		
1919	The Lone Hand		
1919	The Double Hold-Up		
1920	'If Only' Jim	Parkey	
1921	The Beautiful Gambler	Jim Devlin	
1921	The Sheik	Mustapha Ali	
1921	Tiger True	McGuire	
1922	Hills of Missing Men	Bandini	
1923	In the Days of Daniel Boone	Daniel Boone	
1924	Riders of the Plains		
1925	Idaho	Yarrow	
1930	The Dawn Trail	Nestor	
1933	Treason	Army Scout Johnson	
1934	The Prescott Kid	Manuel	
1935	Westward Ho	Vigilante	uncredited
1935	Lawless Range	Rancher	uncredited
1935	Fighting Shadows	Lakue	
1938	Overland Stage Raiders	Rancher	uncredited
