= Eleanor Fried =

American screenwriter (1891–1965)

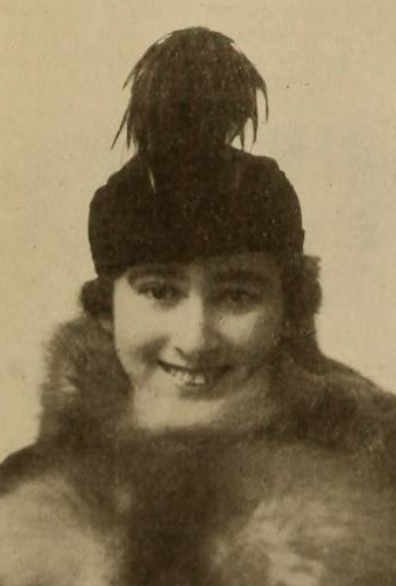
- Eleanor Fried, from a 1916 publication
- Born: June 9, 1891; Grodno, Russian Empire
- Died: October 14, 1965 (aged 74); Los Angeles County, California, USA
- Occupation(s): Film editor, screenwriter
- Spouse: Scott Darling

Eleanor Fried (1891–1965) was a Russian-born American film editor, business manager, and screenwriter who worked at Universal and MGM in the 1910s and 1920s. Like most editors of the early silent era, she didn't receive on-screen credit for her earliest efforts.

== Biography ==
Eleanor was born in Grodno, the Russian Empire (currently Belarus) in 1891. As a young girl, she immigrated to the New York City with her family. She began studying to become a lawyer after high school but instead found herself drawn to showbusiness.

She began her career as a film editor at Universal in New York before moving to Los Angeles to cut films alongside Frank Lawrence at Universal. At Universal, she worked for years as an editor and staff critic before getting a chance to write her own scripts and eventually become a business manager. She was signed to MGM's writing staff in 1926.

She was married to writer-director Scott Darling.

== Selected filmography ==
- Red Clay (1927) (editor)
- The Winged Rider (1926) (screenwriter)
- Colorado (1921) (screenwriter)
- As You Were (1920) (screenwriter)
- The Dragon's Net (1920) (screenwriter and editor)
- Blind Husbands (1919) (editor)
