= The Dragon's Net =

1920 film

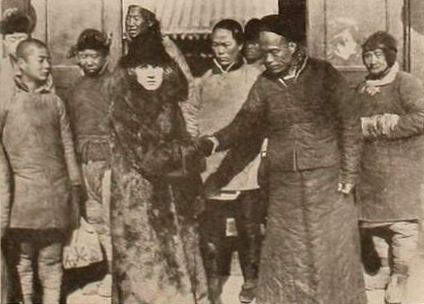
- Walcamp meeting Chinese officials during production of the film
- Directed by: Henry MacRae
- Written by: George Hively; Henry MacRae; Eleanor Fried
- Based on: "The Petals of Lao-Tze" by J. Allan Dunn
- Starring: Marie Walcamp; Harland Tucker
- Edited by: Eleanor Fried
- Distributed by: Universal Film Manufacturing Co.
- Release date: August 23, 1920
- Running time: 12 episodes
- Country: United States
- Language: Silent (English intertitles)

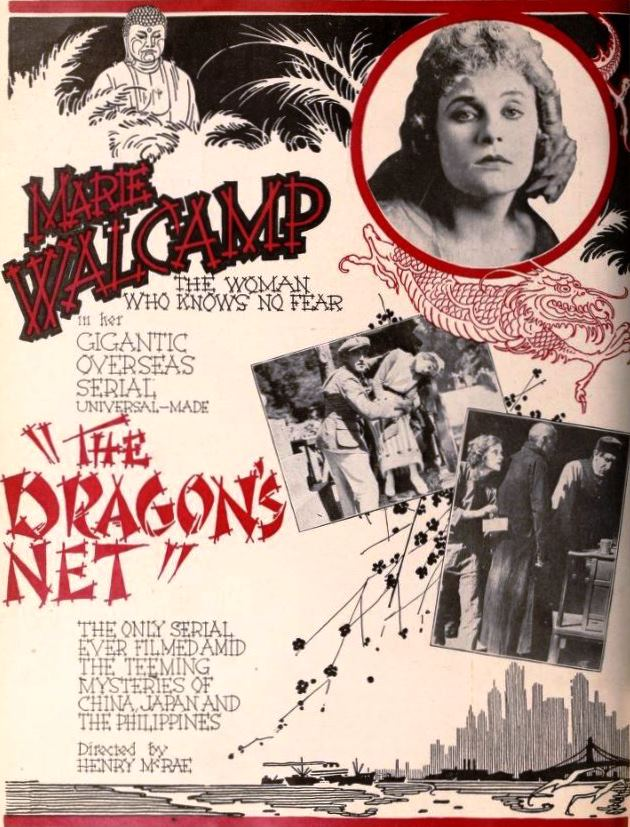
The Dragon's Net ad, 1920

The Dragon's Net is a 1920 action film serial directed by Henry MacRae. It was adapted from J. Allan Dunn's "The Petals of Lao-Tze," from the December 18, 1917 issue of Adventure. Many scenes were shot in the Far East and Hawaii. The film is considered to be lost.

== Cast ==
- Marie Walcamp as Marie Carlton
- Harland Tucker as Harlan Keeler (credited as Harlan Tucker)
- Otto Lederer as King Carson
- Wadsworth Harris as Doctor Redding

== Chapter titles ==
1. The Mysterious Murder
2. Thrown Overboard
3. A Watery Grave
4. Into the Chasm
5. A Jump for Life
6. Captured in China
7. The Unseen Foe
8. Trailed in Peking
9. On the Great Wall of China
10. The Train of Death
11. The Shanghai Peril
12. The Unmasking

== See also ==
- List of film serials
- List of film serials by studio
- List of lost films
