= The Cattle Thief's Escape =

1913 film

The Cattle Thief's Escape (aka:A Minute to Get Out of Sight)
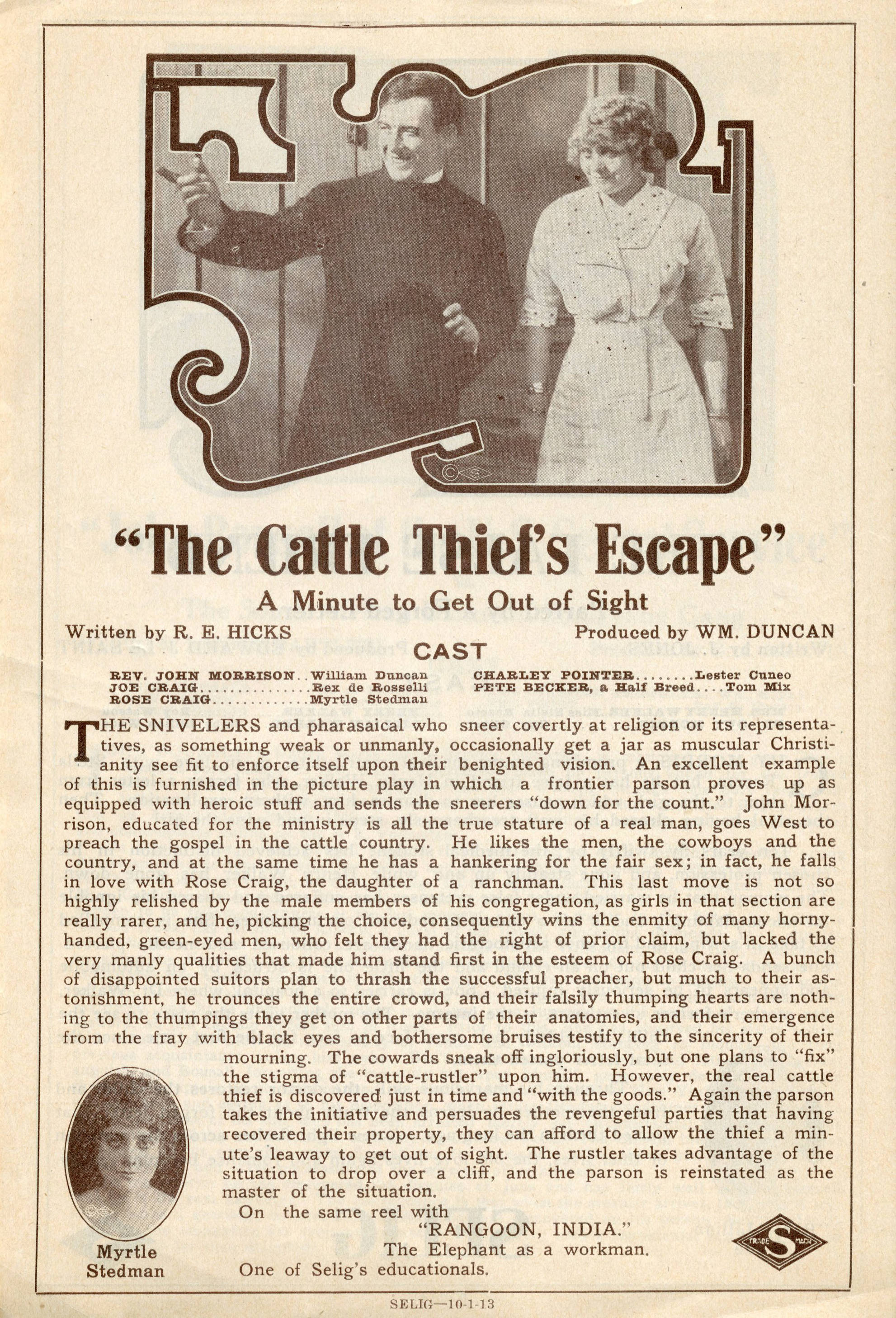
- Flier advertising the release of The Cattle Thief's Escape
- Directed by: William Duncan
- Written by: Russell Hicks
- Produced by: William N. Selig; Selig Polyscope Company
- Starring: William Duncan; Myrtle Stedman
- Distributed by: General Film Company
- Release date: October 1, 1913
- Running time: short
- Country: United States
- Languages: Silent; English intertitles

The Cattle Thief's Escape is a 1913 American short silent Western film directed by and starring William Duncan. It co-stars Rex De Rosselli and Myrtle Stedman while Tom Mix appears in a supporting role. The film was produced by the Selig Polyscope Company and released through the General Film Company. It was released as split reel with Elephant as a Workman, Rangoon, India.

== Cast ==
- William Duncan as Reverend John Morrison
- Rex De Rosselli as Joe Craig
- Myrtle Stedman as Rose Craig
- Lester Cuneo as Charley Pointer
- Tom Mix as Pete Becker, Half Breed
- Old Blue as Pete Becker's Horse (uncredited)
