= The Wine Girl =

1918 silent film

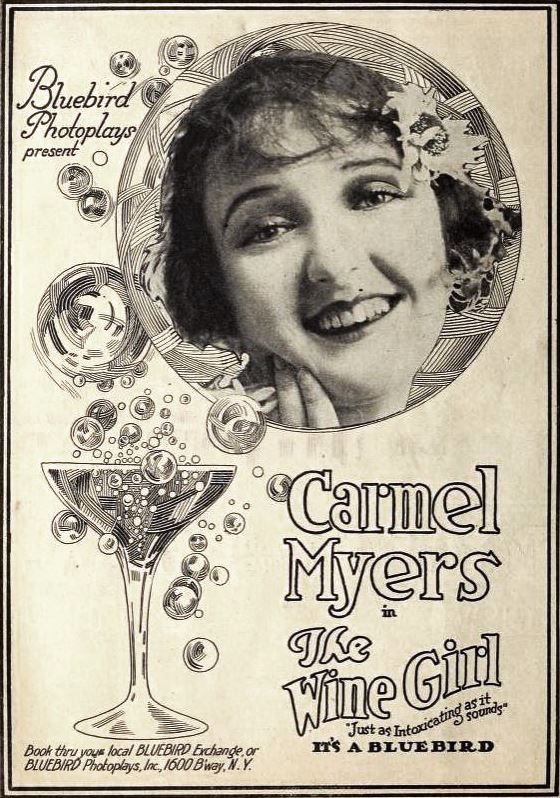
- Directed by: Stuart Paton
- Written by: Harvey Gates
- Starring: Carmel Myers; Rex De Rosselli; Kenneth Harlan
- Cinematography: Duke Hayward
- Production company: Universal Pictures
- Distributed by: Universal Pictures
- Release date: March 25, 1918
- Running time: 50 minutes
- Country: United States
- Languages: Silent; English intertitles

The Wine Girl is a 1918 American silent drama film directed by Stuart Paton and starring Carmel Myers, Rex De Rosselli and Kenneth Harlan.

== Cast ==
- Carmel Myers as Bona
- Rex De Rosselli as Andrea Minghetti
- E. Alyn Warren as Chico Piave
- Kenneth Harlan as Frank Harris
- Katherine Kirkwood as Mrs. Harris

== Bibliography ==
- Gmür, Leonhard . Rex Ingram: Hollywood's Rebel of the Silver Screen. 2013.
