= L. M. Wells =

American actor

- Born: Louis M. Wells; February 5, 1862; Cincinnati, Ohio, US
- Died: January 1, 1923 (aged 60); Los Angeles, California, US
- Occupations: Actor, writer, poet
- Years active: 1912–1922
- Spouse: Hallie Price

Louis "L. M." Wells (February 5, 1862 – January 1, 1923) was an American actor of the silent film era. A tall, robust actor who was nicknamed "Daddy," L. M. appeared in 51 films between 1912 and 1922 — many of which were Universal westerns — and often was cast as a butler.

== Biography ==
L. M. was born in Cincinnati, Ohio, and attended Miami University. Before becoming an actor, he dabbled as a journalist, poet, and short story writer. He was around 50 in 1912 when he appeared in So Near, Yet So Far, his first credited on-screen role. As a player for Universal, he appeared in several dozen films between 1912 and 1920. He died in Los Angeles on January 1, 1923, and was survived by his wife, Hallie Price.

== Selected filmography ==
- So Near, Yet So Far (1912)
- Graft (1915)
- As It Happened (1915)
- The Way Out (1915)
- Behind the Lines (1916)
- Liberty (1916)
- The Voice on the Wire (1917)
- A Wife on Trial (1917)
- Treason (1917)
- The Girl Who Won Out (1917)
- Bucking Broadway (1917)
- Man and Beast (1917)
- Like Wildfire (1917)
- The Red Ace (1917)
- Thieves' Gold (1918) - Mr. Savage
- Huckleberry Finn (1920)
- Vanishing Trails (1920)
- Runnin' Straight (1920)
