= Paul Sablon =

Belgium-born cinema pioneer and animal trainer (1883–1940)

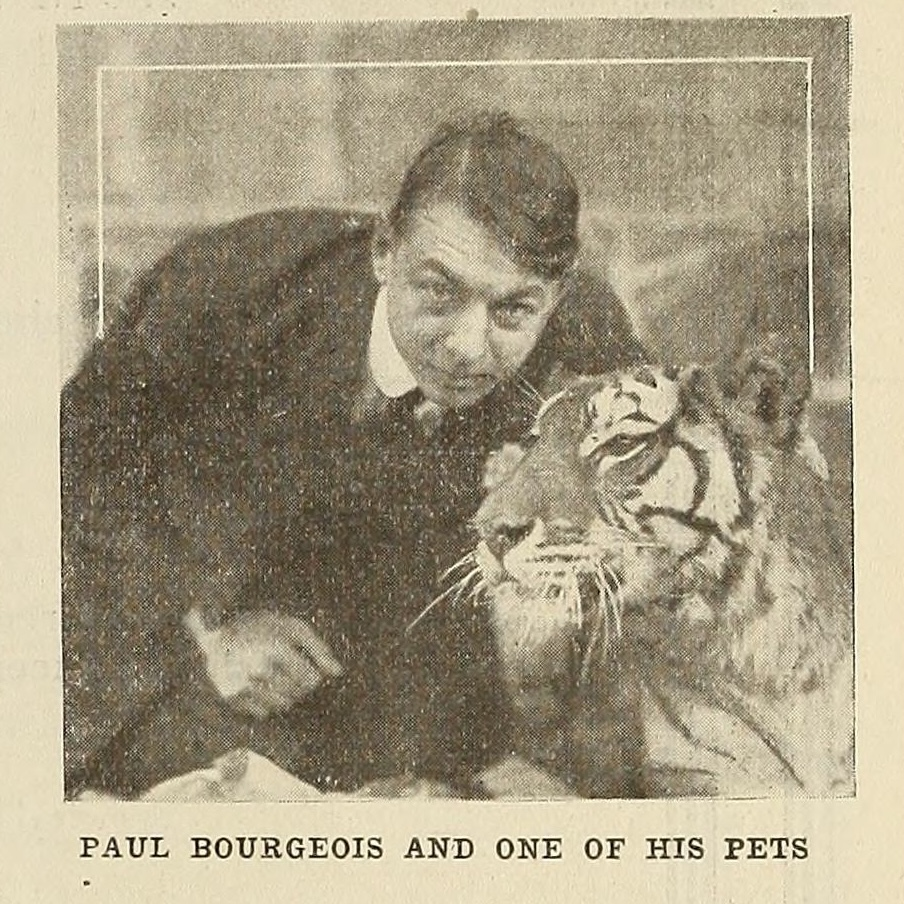
Paul Sablon aka Paul Bourgeois in Motion Picture News, 1915

Paul Sablon (6 November 1888 – 3 November 1940), later Paul Bourgeois, was a Brussels-born actor, director, cinematographer, writer and animal trainer, who worked in the early film industry, including for Pathé Frères in Europe and Universal in the United States.

While working in the Netherlands, "Sablon became the regular cameraman for Alfred Machin’s tiger Mimir." He later toured with the Circus Hagenbeck, developing his animal training skills. During his American era he seems to have been a combination animal trainer, critically and commercially successful director, con man and workplace predator. “Bourgeois and his wife, actress Rosita Marstini, arrived in Hollywood in summer 1915” after he had worked with animals in New York and New Jersey. He was head animal trainer and Universal City Zoo superintendent from approximately 1915 to 1916. In 1916, he defrauded investors with an ice rink scheme and then absconded to Arizona with the money and his 19-year-old stenographer. He spent time in both Canada and the United States but died in his home country of Belgium.

== Filmography ==
Actor:

- 1912: Het vervloekte Geld (The Curse of Money)
- 1913: Beasts of the Jungle
- 1915: The Prisoner of the Harem
- 1916: Hungry Happy’s Dream

Director or cinematographer, in Europe:

- 1912: Babylas va se marier
- 1912: L'Âme des moulins
- 1912: Calvaire du mousse
- 1912: L'Or qui brûle
- 1912: De Molens die juichen en weenen
- 1912: La Peinture et les cochons

Director, working in the United States under the name Paul Bourgeois:

- 1915: Joe Martin Turns 'Em Loose
- 1915: The Tiger-Woman
- 1916: Nadine of Nowhere
- 1916: The Whole Jungle Was After Him
- 1916: On the Trail of the Tigress
