= The Lion's Claws =

1918 film

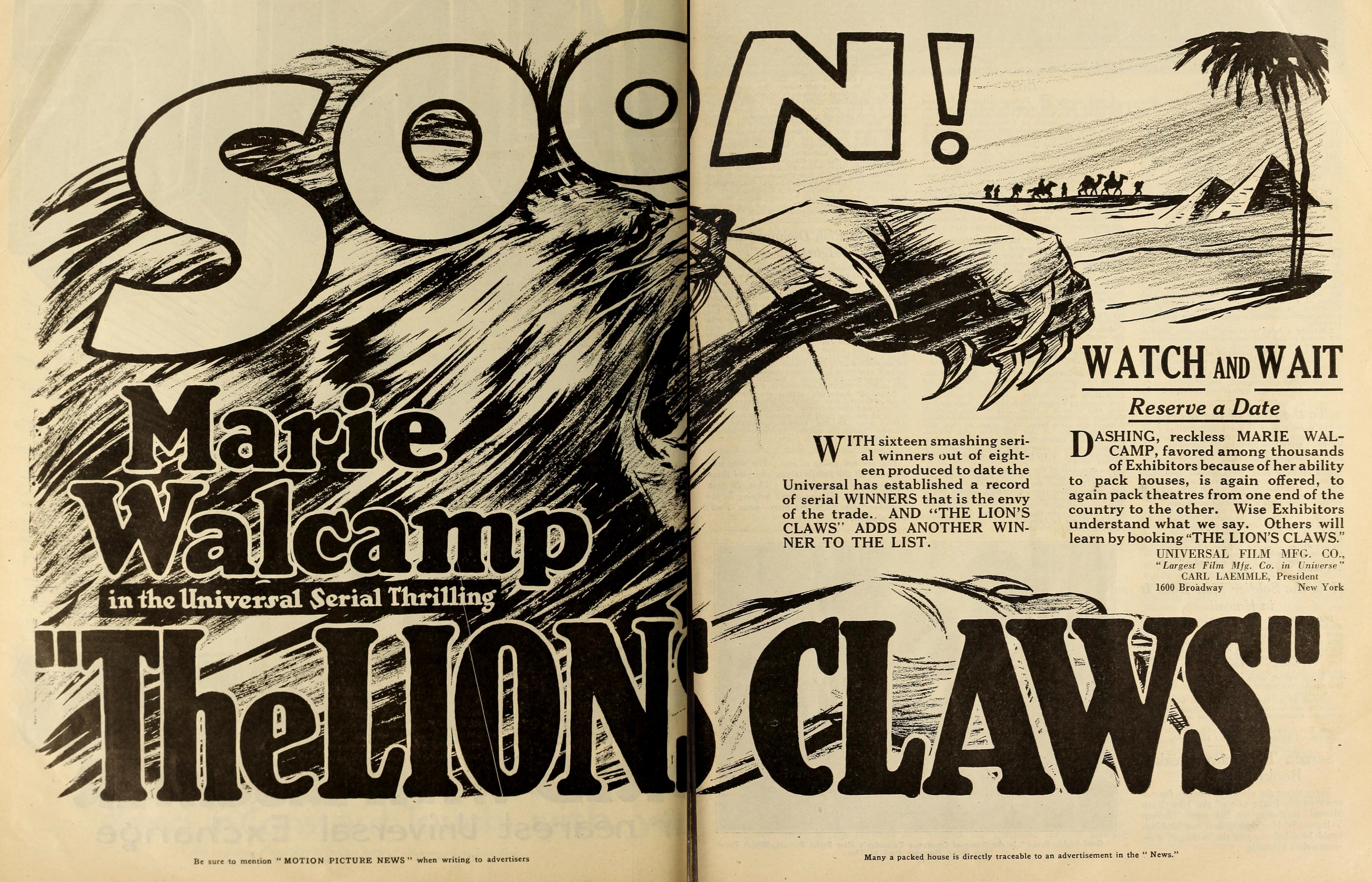
- Two page contemporary advertisement
- Directed by: Harry Harvey; Jacques Jaccard
- Written by: Jacques Jaccard; W. B. Pearson
- Starring: Marie Walcamp; Ray Hanford
- Distributed by: Universal Film Manufacturing Co.
- Release date: April 6, 1918
- Running time: 18 episodes
- Country: United States
- Language: Silent (English intertitles)

The Lion's Claws is a 1918 American adventure film serial directed by Harry Harvey and Jacques Jaccard and starring Marie Walcamp and Ray Hanford. The serial, which had 18 chapters, is considered to be a lost film.

== Cast ==
- Marie Walcamp as Beth Johnson
- Ray Hanford as Buck Masterson
- Neal Hart as Captain Harris
- Frank Lanning as Musa
- Thomas G. Lingham as Captain Johnson
- Alfred Allen as Colonel Leighton
- Gertrude Astor as Lady Mary Leighton
- Edwin August as Roger Hammond
- Rex De Rosselli as Rej Hari
- Harry von Meter as Captain Bogart
- Tom London as Reglis (credited as Leonard Clapham)
- Sam Polo as Uula
- Nigel De Brulier
- Charles Brinley
- Sam Appel

== Reception ==
Like many American films of the time, The Lion's Claws was subject to cuts by city and state film censorship boards. For example, the Chicago Board of Censors required cuts, in Chapter 2, Reel 1, the shooting of a man in a house; in Chapter 4, Reel 2, shortened the scene of man choking a young woman and cut the closeup of her being choked; in Chapter 5, Reel 1, Arab choking young woman, shooting Arab and his falling, and, Reel 2, shooting Arab and his falling; in Chapter 6, Reel 1, two scenes of shooting black man and white man, closeup of King and soldier in knife duel on floor and scene on platform where knife descends, Reel 2, placing young woman on block and last two torture scenes were machine descends; in Chapter 7, Reel 1, closeup of strangling young woman, two close views of young woman chained to rack, two scenes of spikes descending, and, in Reel 2, closeup of knives suspended over men's heads; in Chapter 8, Reel 1, swords suspended over bound men, two scenes of attacks on natives inside house, reduce to half seven scenes of natives shooting at soldiers, Reel 2, two scenes of choking natives, all views of young woman where her figure is clearly shown through her draperies to include scene where she is shown in group in harem and five scenes of her struggling with natives, two fight scenes in which natives are beaten, and two choking scenes; in Chapter 9, Reel 1, flash scene of semi-nude young woman after she is pulled from tank, shooting man at bank, and shooting man and his falling; in Chapter 10, two closeups of binding young woman's hands and feet; in Chapter 11, Reel 1, shooting man and man falling from horse and, Reel 2, shooting man and man falling down cliff;, in Chapter 14, Reel 1, two scenes of muffling young woman, Reel 2, scene of man with spear in back, four scenes of binding man and young woman to posts and lighting fire under them, shooting native, and native with spear in back, and, in Chapter 15, Reel 1, two closeups of man's bloody face.

== See also ==
- List of film serials
- List of film serials by studio
- List of lost films
