= The Red Glove =

1919 film

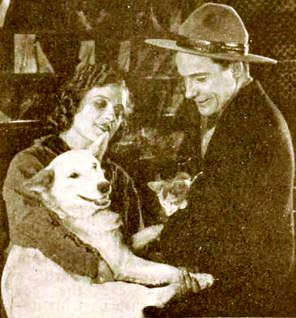
- Film still with Walcamp and O'Malley
- Directed by: J. P. McGowan
- Written by: Douglas Grant; Hope Loring
- Starring: Marie Walcamp; Pat O'Malley
- Distributed by: Universal Film Manufacturing Co.
- Release date: March 17, 1919
- Running time: 18 episodes
- Country: United States
- Language: Silent (English intertitles)

The Red Glove is a 1919 American film serial directed by J. P. McGowan for Universal. The film is considered to be lost.

== Plot ==
Walcamp played a "fearless cowgirl" engaged in "perilous adventures" in the cliffhanger style. One episode featured a train robbery, and that scene was filmed at the Sierra Railway on May 26, 1919.

== Cast ==
- Marie Walcamp as Billie
- Pat O'Malley as Kern Thodes (early chapters)
- Truman Van Dyke as Kern Thodes (later chapters)
- Thomas G. Lingham as Starr Wiley
- Leon De La Mothe as "The Vulture"
- Alfred Allen as Geoff "Gentleman Geoff"
- Evelyn Selbie as Tiajuana
- William Dyer

== Chapter Titles ==
1. The Pool of Mystery (a.k.a. The Pool of Lost Souls)
2. The Claws of The Vulture
3. The Vulture's Vengeance
4. The Passing of Gentleman Geoff
5. At The Mercy of A Monster
6. The Flames of Death
7. A Desperate Chance
8. Facing Death
9. A Leap For Life
10. Out of Death's Shadow
11. Through Fire and Water (a.k.a. In the Depths of The Sea)
12. In Death's Grip
13. Trapped
14. The Lost Millions
15. The Mysterious Message
16. In Search of A Name (a.k.a. In Deadly Peril)
17. The Rope of Death
18. Run To Earth

== See also ==
- List of film serials
- List of film serials by studio
