= The Revenge of Pancho Villa =

1936 film

The Revenge of Pancho Villa (1930–36)—Spanish title La Venganza de Pancho Villa—is a compilation film made by the Padilla family in El Paso, Texas, USA, from dozens of fact-based and fictional films about the celebrated Mexican revolutionary Pancho Villa (1878–1923).

The films were stitched together with original bilingual title cards and dramatic re-enactments of Villa's assassination were added to the revised print. The Revenge of Pancho Villa provides stirring evidence of a vital Mexican American film presence during the 1910s-1930s.

In 2009, it was selected for preservation in the National Film Registry by the Library of Congress for being “culturally, historically or aesthetically” significant.
