= The Red Ace =

1917 film

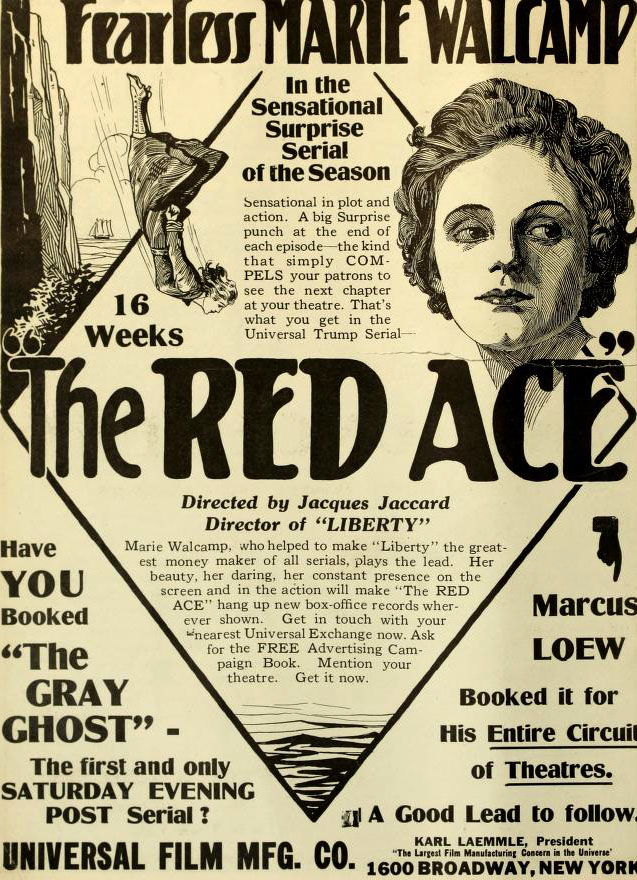
- Advertisement for film
- Directed by: Jacques Jaccard
- Written by: Jacques Jaccard
- Starring: Marie Walcamp; Lawrence Peyton
- Distributed by: Universal Film Manufacturing Co.
- Release date: October 22, 1917
- Running time: 16 episodes
- Country: United States
- Language: Silent (English intertitles)

The Red Ace is a 1917 American adventure film serial directed by Jacques Jaccard. An incomplete print which is missing four chapters survives in the film archive of the Library of Congress.

== Cast ==
- Marie Walcamp as Virginia Dixon
- Lawrence Peyton as Sergeant Sidney Winthrop (as Larry Peyton)
- L. M. Wells as Pierre Fouchard
- Bobby Mack as Patrick Kelly
- Charles Brinley as Steele Heffern
- Harry Archer as Dr. Hertzman
- Noble Johnson as Little Bear

== Chapter titles ==
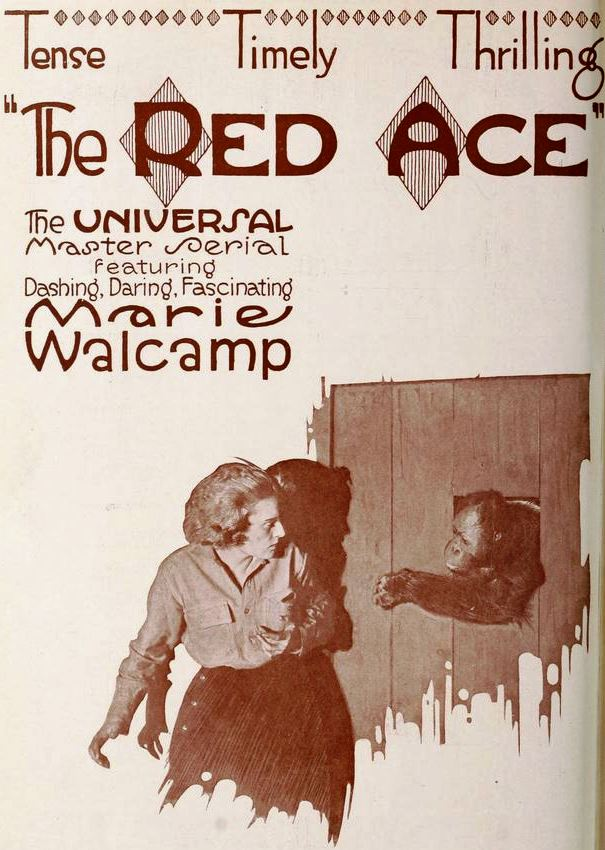
Advertisement

1. Silent Terror
2. Lure of the Unattainable
3. A Leap for Liberty
4. The Undercurrent
5. In Mid-Air
6. Fighting Blood
7. The Lion's Claws
8. Lair of the Beast
9. A Voice from the Dead; or, Voice from the Past
10. Hearts of Steel
11. The Burning Span
12. Overboard
13. New Enemies
14. The Fugitives
15. Hell's Riders
16. Virginia's Triumph

== Reception ==
Like many American films of the time, The Red Ace was subject to cuts by city and state film censorship boards. The Chicago Board of Censors required, in Chapter 1, an attack by an ape-man be flashed and one on a chauffeur be cut; in Chapter 2, to flash an attack on a man; in Chapter 3, cut three scenes that showed a painting of a semi-nude woman and to flash a scene where the men in the foreground have a drink; in Chapter 4, cut a scene of a man at a bar shooting another man; in Chapter 6, cut the slugging of an Indian on the head with a rifle; in Chapter 7, cut two fight scenes, three struggle scenes of girl on stairs, all closeups of man with rope around neck, seven views of pulling of rope, view of man's body swinging in air, and the shooting of an Indian; in Chapter 11, the holdup and binding of the couple and two scenes of placing dynamite on the bridge; in Chapter 12, a closeup of the choking of a man; in Chapter 15, slugging a soldier and two scenes of men falling from horse; in Chapter 16, the last two scenes of dragging the young woman, man falling over after being shot, man falling over rock, two scenes of man laying on rock after being shot, man falling after shooting, and flash all scenes of gila monster.

== See also ==
- List of film serials
- List of film serials by studio
- List of incomplete or partially lost films
