= Marie Walcamp =

American actress (1894–1936)

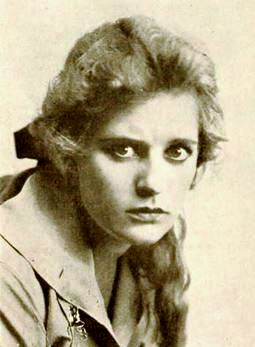
- Walcamp, 1919
- Born: July 27, 1894; Dennison, Ohio, U.S.
- Died: November 17, 1936 (aged 42); Los Angeles, California, U.S.
- Occupation: Actress
- Years active: 1913–1927
- Spouse: Harland Tucker

Marie Walcamp (July 27, 1894 – November 17, 1936) was an American actress of the silent film era, often specializing in roles as an "action heroine" in serials, including Westerns. She often appeared with actor Eddie Polo.

== Biography ==
Born in Dennison, Ohio, Walcamp was the daughter of Mary (née Mackel) and Arnold Walcamp. She relocated to the East Coast after finishing her formal education, making the move with hopes of finding acting jobs on the stage. After landing various roles in New York, she signed to Universal Studios in 1913 and was cast at the age of 19 in the film The Werewolf.

She appeared in more than 50 motion pictures, mostly shorts, over the next two years, although by 1916 the pace of her work in films began to decrease. That year she still performed in no less than 13 productions, including the leading role in the Western serial Liberty. She was known for doing her own dangerous stunts, which earned her nicknames like "The Daredevil of the Films" and "The Dare-Devil Girl of the Movies".

By the 1920s, however, Walcamp's movie career had effectively ended, as fewer serials were being made. Her final role was in 1927 as Alice Gage in In a Moment of Temptation. On November 17, 1936, Walcamp, suffering from depression, committed suicide by turning on the gas in her Los Angeles apartment while her husband, actor Harland Tucker, was away on business. In her will, she asked that her ashes be scattered over the back lot at Universal Studios, where she had worked for many years.

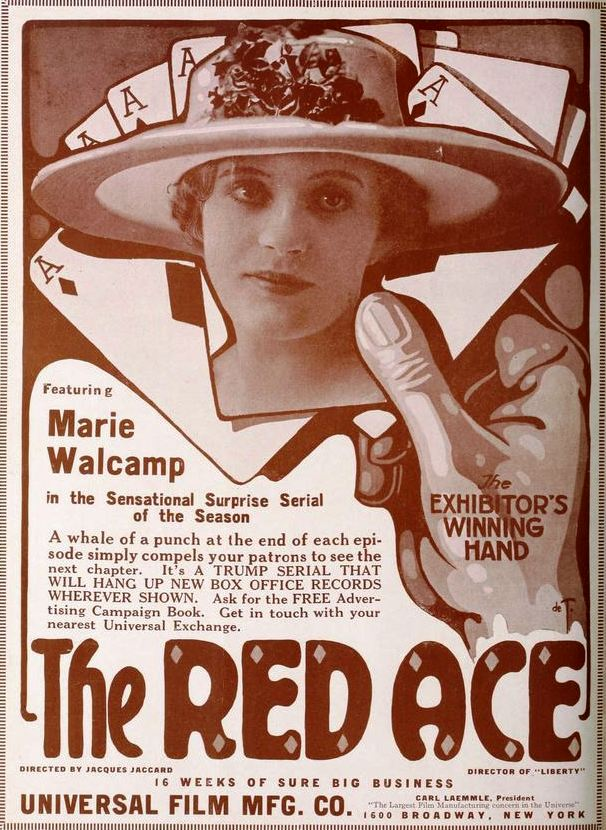
Magazine advertisement for the serial The Red Ace with Walcamp, 1917.

== Selected filmography ==
- The Werewolf (1913)
- By Fate's Decree (1913)
- The Doctor's Orders (1913)
- The Girl and the Tiger (1913)
- The Girl Ranchers (1913)
- The Village Blacksmith (1913)
- What the Wild Waves Did (1913)
- Won in the Clouds (1914)
- A Redskin Reckoning (1914)
- The Phantom Light (1914)
- Our Enemy's Spy (1914)
- The Option (1914)
- Olana of the South Seas (1914)
- A Nation's Peril (1914)
- The Brand of His Tribe (1914)
- Cast Adrift in the South Seas (1914)
- A Daughter of the Plains (1914)
- The Flash of Fate (1914)
- The Great Universal Mystery (1914)
- The Half-Breed (1914)
- Hiram and Zeke Masquerade (1914)
- In the Wolves' Fangs (1914)
- The Isle of Abandoned Hope (1914)
- Johnnie from Jonesboro (1914)
- The Jungle Master (1914)
- The Law of the Lumberjack (1914)
- The Law of the Range (1914)
- The Legion of the Phantom Tribe (1914)
- The Lure of the Geisha (1914)
- A Mexican Spy in America (1914)
- Rescued by Wireless (1914)
- A Romance of Hawaii (1914)
- The Silent Peril (1914)
- The Trial Breakers (1914)
- The Vagabond Soldier (1914)
- Tempest Cody (1914)
- Kidnapper (1914)
- Terrors of the Jungle (1915)
- The Test of a Man (1915)
- The Toll of the Sea (1915)
- The Torrent (1915)
- The War of the Wild (1915)
- The Yellow Star (1915)
- The Awaited Hour (1915)
- The Blood of His Brother (1915)
- The Blood of the Children (1915)
- The Broken Toy (1915)
- The Circus Girl's Romance (1915)
- The Crime of Thought (1915)
- Custer's Last Scout (1915)
- A Daughter of the Jungles (1915)
- A Fight to a Finish (1915)
- The Governor Maker (1915)
- The Heart of a Tigress (1915)
- In Jungle Wilds (1915)
- The Jungle Queen (1915)
- The Lost Ledge (1915)
- The Oaklawn Handicap (1915)
- Ridgeway of Montana (1915)
- Surrender (1915)
- Coral (1915)
- A Double Deal in Pork (1915)
- From the Lion's Jaws (1915)
- Chasing the Limited (1915)
- The Mysterious Contragrav (1915)
- Hop, the Devil's Brew (1916)
- The Flirt (1916)
- John Needham's Double (1916)
- Liberty (1916)
- Discontent (1916)
- The Human Pendulum (1916)
- The Iron Rivals (1916)
- A Railroad Bandit (1916)
- The Money Lenders (1916)
- Onda of the Orient (1916)
- The State Witness (1916)
- Tammany's Tiger (1916)
- The Silent Terror (1916)
- The Quest of Virginia (1916)
- Where Are My Children? (1916)
- The Leap (1916)
- Who Pulled the Trigger? (1916)
- Her Great Mistake (1917)
- The Indian's Lament (1917)
- A Jungle Tragedy (1917)
- The Star Witness (1917)
- Steel Hearts (1917)
- The Red Ace (1917)
- Patria (1917)
- The Kidnapped Bride (1917)
- The Lion's Claws (1918)
- Tongues of Flame (1918)
- The Whirlwind Finish (1918)
- The Red Glove (1919)
- Tempest Cody Bucks the Trust (1919)
- Tempest Cody Flirts with Death (1919)
- Tempest Cody Gets Her Man (1919)
- Tempest Cody Hits the Trail (1919)
- Tempest Cody Plays Detective (1919)
- Tempest Cody Rides Wild (1919)
- Tempest Cody Turns the Tables (1919)
- Tempest Cody's Man Hunt (1919)
- The Dragon's Net (1920)
- The Blot (1921)
- Western Vengeance (1924)
- Treasure Canyon (1924)
- A Desperate Adventure (1924)
- In A Moment of Temptation (1927)
