= Man and Beast (1917 film) =

- Directed by: Henry MacRae
- Written by: Reed Heustis
- Produced by: Henry MacRae
- Starring: Harry Clifton; Eileen Sedgwick; L.M. Wells
- Cinematography: Edgar Ellis Benedict; Fred LeRoy Granville
- Production company: Universal Pictures
- Distributed by: Universal Pictures
- Release date: June 23, 1917
- Running time: 50 minutes
- Country: United States
- Languages: Silent; English intertitles

Man and Beast is a 1917 American silent adventure film directed by Henry MacRae and starring Harry Clifton, Eileen Sedgwick and L.M. Wells.

== Cast ==
- Harry Clifton as Carl von Haagen
- Eileen Sedgwick as Gretel von Haagen
- L.M. Wells as Mr.Townsend
- Mattie Witting as Mrs. Townsend
- J. Parks Jones as Ned Townsend
- Kingsley Benedict as Eitel van Haagen

== Bibliography ==
- Robert B. Connelly. The Silents: Silent Feature Films, 1910-36, Volume 40, Issue 2. December Press, 1998.
