= Rex De Rosselli =

American actor

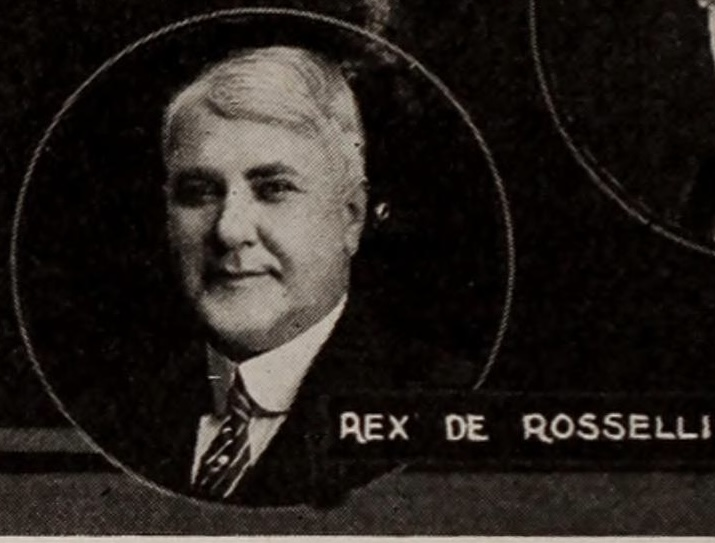
- Born: May 1, 1878; Kentucky, US
- Died: July 21, 1941 (aged 63); East Saint Louis, US
- Occupation: Actor
- Years active: 1911–1926

Rex De Rosselli (May 1, 1878 – July 21, 1941), was an American actor of the silent era, mainly appearing in Westerns. He appeared in more than 150 films between 1911 and 1926. He was born in Kentucky and died in East Saint Louis. He also served as head trainer of the Universal City Zoo from approximately 1915 to 1917. Rex De Rosselli was described as a "silver-haired Beau Brummell" who alternated film work in the winters and circus work in the summers.

== Selected filmography ==
- The Dynamiters (1912), directed by William Duncan
- The Cattle Thief's Escape (1913)
- The Spy (1914)
- Graft (1915)
- Coral (1915)
- The Gift Girl (1917)
- Money Madness (1917)
- The Fighting Gringo (1917)
- The Brazen Beauty (1918)
- The Wine Girl (1918)
- The Lion's Claws (1918)
- Elmo the Mighty (1919)
- Reputation (1921)
- The Man Tamer (1921)
- The Rowdy (1921)
- Lazy Lightning (1926)

== See also ==
- Universal City Zoo, where De Rosselli was head trainer
