= 1918 in film =

The year 1918 in film involved some significant events.

== Events ==
- January 27 – Tarzan makes his film debut in Tarzan of the Apes.
- March 10 – Warner Bros. release their first produced picture, My Four Years in Germany.
- July – The animated The Sinking of the Lusitania is one of the first examples of animation being used for something other than comedy.
- Following litigation for anti-trust activities, the Motion Picture Patents Company disbands.
- Louis B. Mayer arrives in Los Angeles and forms Louis B. Mayer Pictures Corporation.
- 28 mm safety standard film, designed by Alexander Victor, becomes one of the earliest film formats to use "safety film" bases in order to safeguard the amateur market against nitrate fires.

== Top-grossing films (U.S.) ==
The top six 1918 released films by box office gross in North America are as follows:

Highest-grossing films of 1918
Rank	Title	Studio	Domestic rentals
1	Old Wives for New	Paramount	$286,504
2	The Squaw Man	Paramount	$283,556
3	The Whispering Chorus	Paramount	$242,109
4	We Can't Have Everything	Paramount	$207,890
5	Till I Come Back to You	Paramount	$183,834

== Films by country ==
- Australia
- France
- Germany
- Italy
- Japan
- Mexico
- Netherlands
- Soviet Union
- Sweden
- United Kingdom
- United States

== Notable films ==
Films produced in the United States unless stated otherwise

=== A ===
- All Night, comedy drama directed by Paul Powell for Bluebird Photoplays, starring Carmel Myers and Rudolph Valentino
- Amarilly of Clothes-Line Alley, romantic comedy directed by Marshall Neilan for Famous Players–Lasky, starring Mary Pickford
- Arizona (lost), melodrama directed by Albert Parker for Famous Players–Lasky, starring Douglas Fairbanks; based on the 1899 play by Augustus Thomas

=== B ===
- The Bell Boy, comedy short directed by and starring Fatty Arbuckle for Paramount, with Buster Keaton
- The Birth of a Race, drama directed by John W. Noble
- The Blue Bird, fantasy directed by Maurice Tourneur for Paramount
- 'Blue Blazes' Rawden, drama directed by and starring William S. Hart for Paramount
- The Bond, propaganda short film directed by and starring Charlie Chaplin for First National Pictures, with Edna Purviance

=== C ===
- Carmen (US: Gypsy Blood), drama directed by Ernst Lubitsch for UFA, starring Pola Negri – (Germany)
- The Cook, comedy short directed by and starring Fatty Arbuckle for Paramount, with Buster Keaton
- The Craving, drama directed by Francis Ford and John Ford for Universal

=== D ===
- A Dog's Life, comedy drama short directed by and starring Charlie Chaplin for First National Pictures, with Edna Purviance

=== E ===
- The Eyes of the Mummy (Die Augen der Mumie Ma), horror directed by Ernst Lubitsch for UFA, starring Pola Negri and Emil Jannings – (Germany)

=== F ===
- Father Sergius (Otets Sergiy), drama directed by Yakov Protazanov and Alexandre Volkoff, starring Ivan Mosjoukine; based on the 1911 short story by Leo Tolstoy – (USSR)

=== G ===
- The Ghost of Slumber Mountain (incomplete), stop-motion fantasy directed by Willis H. O'Brien for the World Film Company
- Good Night, Nurse!, comedy short directed by and starring Fatty Arbuckle for Paramount, with Buster Keaton

=== H ===
- The Heart of Humanity, war propaganda film directed by Allen Holubar for Universal, starring Dorothy Phillips and Erich von Stroheim
- Hearts of the World, melodramatic propaganda film directed by D. W. Griffith for Paramount, starring Lillian Gish and Dorothy Gish
- Hell Bent, western directed by John Ford for Universal, starring Harry Carey

=== I ===
- I Don't Want to Be a Man (Ich möchte kein Mann sein), romantic comedy directed by Ernst Lubitsch for UFA, starring Ossi Oswalda – (Germany)

=== J ===
- Johanna Enlists, comedy drama directed by William Desmond Taylor for Paramount, starring Mary Pickford

=== L ===
- Little Orphant Annie, drama directed by Colin Campbell for the World Film Company, starring Colleen Moore; based on the 1885 poem by James Whitcomb Riley

=== M ===
- The Married Virgin, drama directed by Joe Maxwell for the General Film Company, starring Rudolph Valentino
- Mickey, comedy drama directed by F. Richard Jones and James Young for FBO, starring Mabel Normand
- M'Liss, comedy drama directed by Marshall Neilan for Paramount, starring Mary Pickford and Thomas Meighan
- Moonshine, comedy short directed by and starring Fatty Arbuckle for Paramount, with Buster Keaton
- My Four Years in Germany, war drama directed by William Nigh for First National Pictures; first film produced by Warner Bros.

=== O ===
- Old Wives for New, drama directed by Cecil B. DeMille for Paramount
- Out West, comedy short directed by and starring Fatty Arbuckle for Paramount, with Buster Keaton
- The Outlaw and His Wife (Berg-Ejvind och hans hustru), drama directed by and starring Victor Sjöström – (Sweden)

=== R ===
- Riddle Gawne (incomplete), western directed by William S. Hart and Lambert Hillyer for Paramount, starring Hart and Lon Chaney
- The Romance of Tarzan (lost), action adventure directed by Wilfred Lucas for First National Pictures, starring Elmo Lincoln and Enid Markey; based on the 1912 novel Tarzan of the Apes by Edgar Rice Burroughs

=== S ===
- Salomé (incomplete), drama directed by J. Gordon Edwards for Fox Film, starring Theda Bara
- Shoulder Arms, comedy directed by and starring Charlie Chaplin for First National Pictures, with Edna Purviance
- The Sinking of the Lusitania, animated short propaganda film by Winsor McCay for Universal
- Stella Maris, drama directed by Marshall Neilan for Famous Players–Lasky, starring Mary Pickford

=== T ===
- Tarzan of the Apes, action adventure directed by Scott Sidney for First National Pictures, starring Elmo Lincoln and Enid Markey; based on the 1812 novel by Edgar Rice Burroughs
- A Trip to Mars (Himmelskibet), sci-fi adventure directed by Holger-Madsen – (Denmark)
- Triple Trouble, comedy short directed by Charlie Chaplin and Leo White for Essanay Studios, starring Chaplin and Edna Purviance

=== W ===
- The Whispering Chorus, psychological drama directed by Cecil B. DeMille for Famous Players–Lasky, starring Raymond Hatton and Kathlyn Williams

== Comedy film series ==
Only the films of the series released in 1918 are collected

=== Buster Keaton (1917–1944) ===
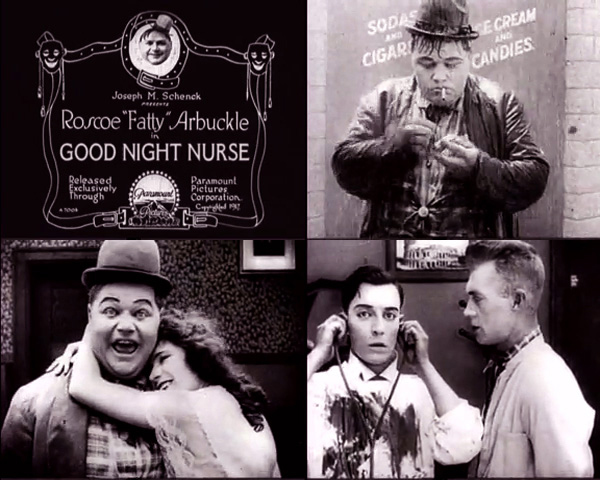
Snapshot of Good Night, Nurse!.

Films starring Roscoe Arbuckle, featuring Buster Keaton released in 1918:

- January 20: Out West as Sheriff / Saloon owner.
- March 18: The Bell Boy as Bellboy.

=== Charlie Chaplin (1914–1940) ===
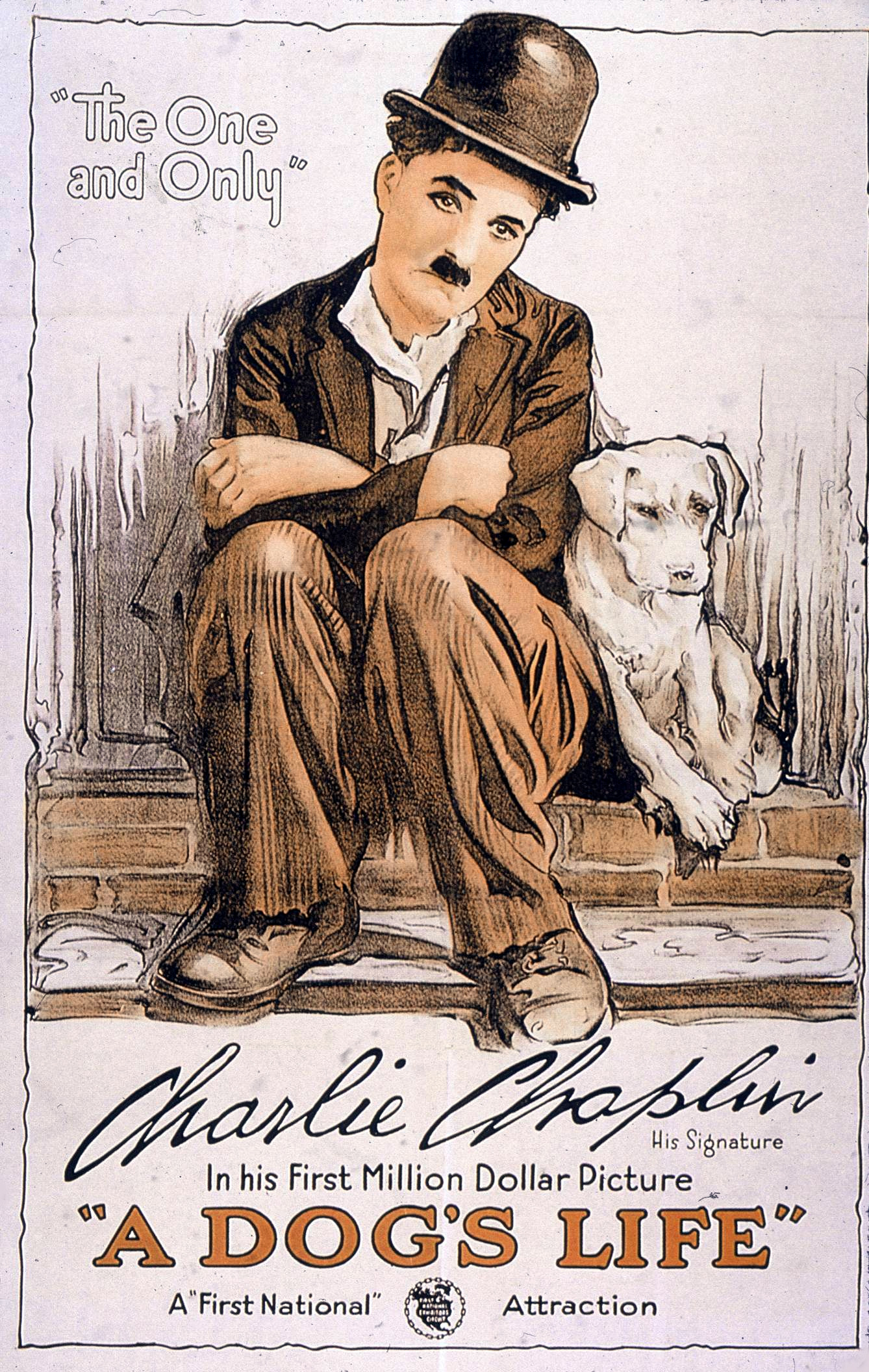
Film poster for A Dog's Life.

- 11 August: Triple Trouble; compilation assembled by Leo White with scenes from Police and an unfinished short, Life, along with new material shot by White. Chaplin includes this production in the filmography of his autobiography.
- May 1918: Chase Me Charlie; a seven-reel montage of Essanay films, edited by Langford Reed. Released in England.

Charlie Chaplin wrote, produced, directed, and starred in 9 films for his own production company between 1918 and 1923. These films were distributed by First National. Below the movies released in 1918:

- 14 April: A Dog's Life
- 29 September: The Bond
- 20 October: Shoulder Arms

Uncompleted and unreleased films

- How to Make Movies: Never assembled, although parts were used in The Chaplin Revue (see below)
  Reconstructed in 1981 by Kevin Brownlow and David Gill
- Untitled film: A charity film co-starring Harry Lauder.

=== Harold Lloyd (1913–1938) ===
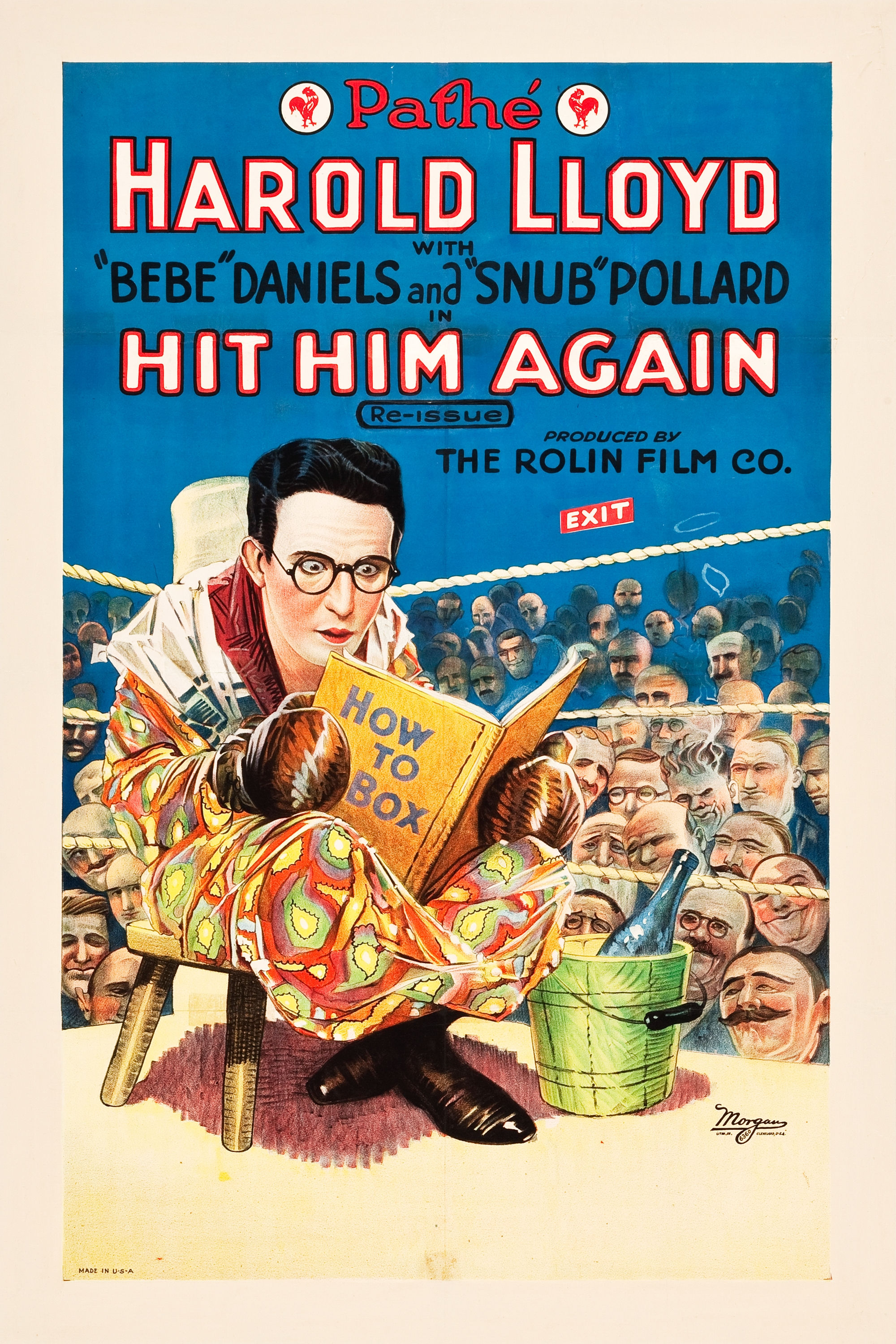
Hit Him Again.

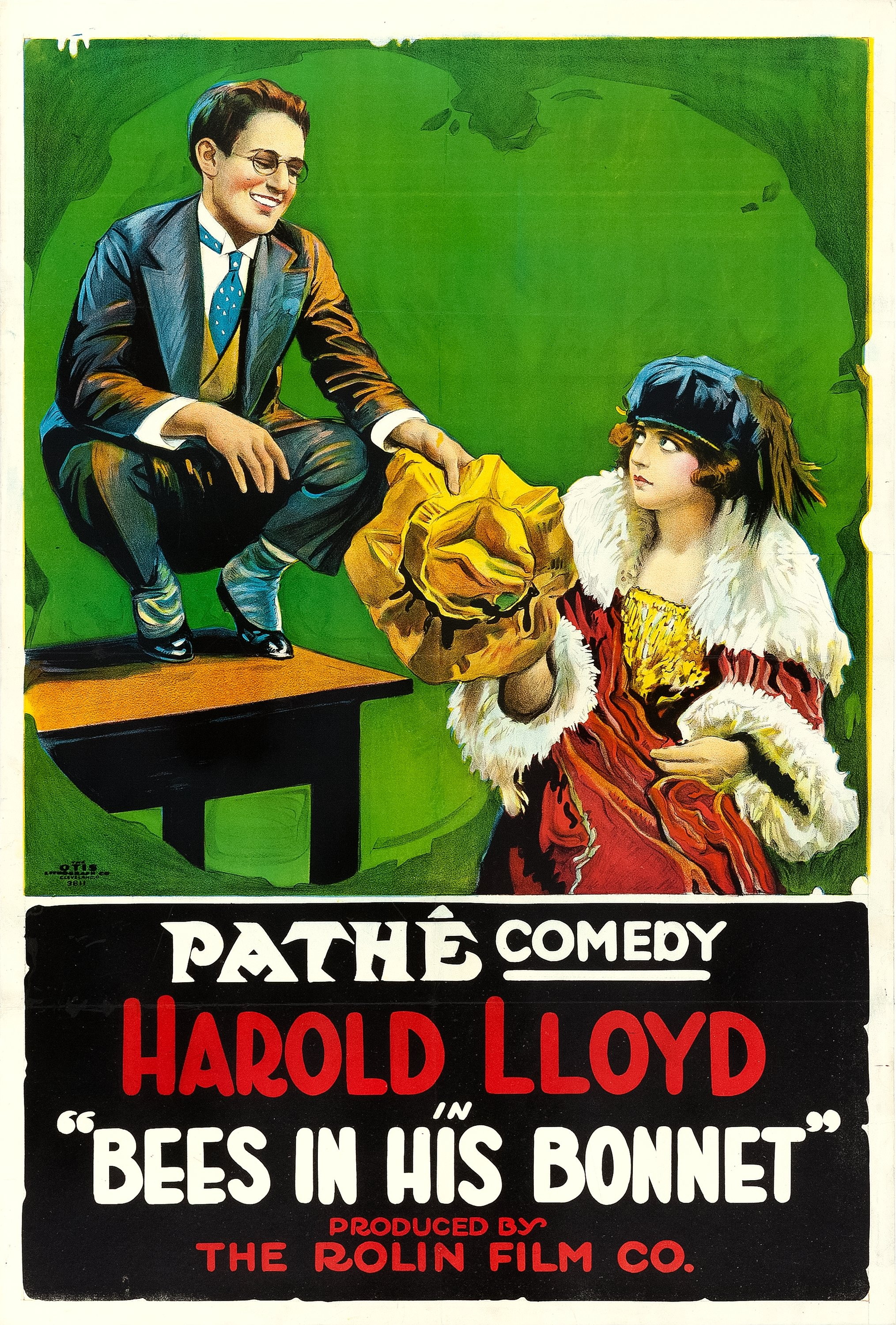
Bees in His Bonnet.

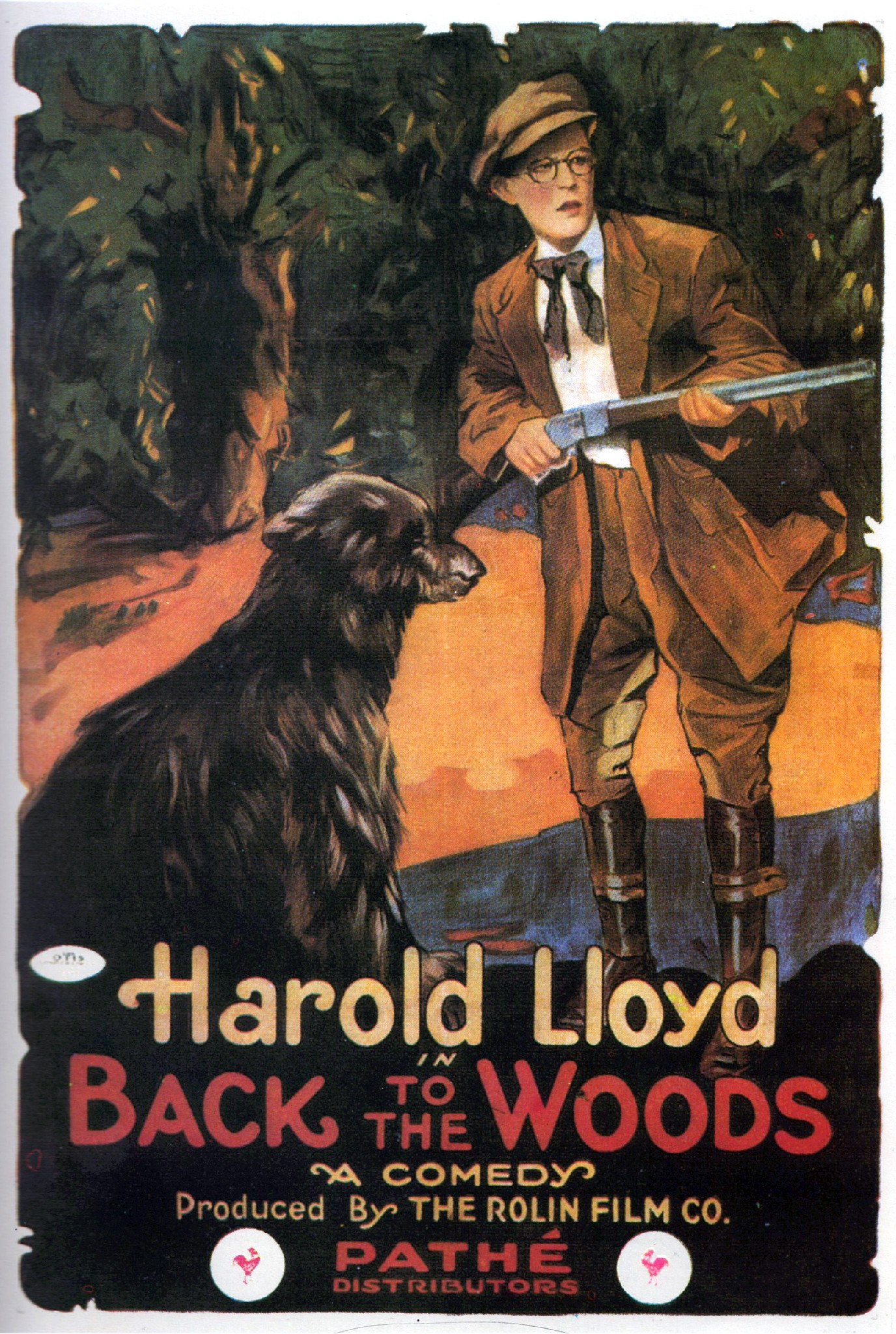
Back to the Woods.

Glasses character ("The Boy"):

- The Tip
- The Lamb
- Hit Him Again
- Beat It
- A Gasoline Wedding
- Look Pleasant, Please
- Here Come the Girls
- Let's Go
- On the Jump
- Follow the Crowd
- Pipe the Whiskers as Janitor
- It's a Wild Life
- Hey There!
- Kicked Out
- The Non-Stop Kid
- Two-Gun Gussie
- Fireman Save My Child
- The City Slicker
- Sic 'Em, Towser
- Somewhere in Turkey
- Are Crooks Dishonest? – sometimes wrongly titled as Doing, Doing, Done
- An Ozark Romance
- Kicking the Germ Out of Germany
- That's Him
- Bride and Gloom
- Two Scrambled
- Bees in His Bonnet
- Swing Your Partners
- Why Pick on Me?
- Nothing but Trouble
- Back to the Woods
- Hear 'Em Rave
- Take a Chance
- She Loves Me Not

=== Lupino Lane (1915–1939) ===
Short films acting as his character Mr. Butterbun released in 1918:

- His Busy Day
- His Salad Days
- Love and Lobster
- The Blunders of Mr. Butterbun: Trips and Tribunals
- The Blunders of Mr. Butterbun: Unexpected Treasure
- The Haunted Hotel

== Births ==
- January 29 – John Forsythe, actor (died 2010)
- February 4 – Ida Lupino, actress, director (died 1995)
- February 15 - Allan Arbus, actor (died 2013)
- February 16 – Patty Andrews, singer, actress, member of The Andrews Sisters (died 2013)
- February 19 - Fay McKenzie, American actress and singer (died 2019)
- March 1 – Roger Delgado, actor (died 1973)
- March 9
  - Marguerite Chapman, actress (died 1999)
  - Mickey Spillane, writer, actor (died 2006)
- March 14 –Dennis Patrick, actor (died 2002)
- April 14 – Mary Healy, actress, singer (died 2015)
- April 17
  - William Holden, actor (died 1981)
  - Anne Shirley, actress (died 1993)
- April 18 – Shinobu Hashimoto, screenwriter (died 2018)
- May 14 – June Duprez, actress (died 1984)
- May 15 – Joseph Wiseman, Canadian-American actor (died 2009)
- May 20 - Patricia Ellis, American actress (died 1970)
- May 21 - Jeanne Bates, American actress (died 2008)
- May 26 – John Dall, actor (died 1971)
- June 8 – Robert Preston, actor, singer (died 1987)
- June 10 - Barry Morse, actor (died 2008)
- June 11 – Jane Bryan, actress (died 2009)
- June 13 - Ben Johnson, actor (died 1996)
- June 18 – Elisabeth Waldo, American musician and actress (died 2026)
- June 21 - Adriana Sivieri, Italian actress (died 1970)
- June 26 – Ellen Liiger, actress (died 1987)
- July 6 – Sebastian Cabot, actor (died 1977)
- July 8 – Craig Stevens, American actor (died 2000)
- July 14 – Ingmar Bergman, Swedish actor, writer, director (died 2007)
- July 16 – William Bishop, actor (died 1959)
- July 18 – Jane Frazee, singer, actress (died 1985)
- July 26 – Marjorie Lord, actress (died 2015)
- August 1 – Cheryl Walker, model, actress (died 1971)
- August 9 – Robert Aldrich, director (died 1983)
- August 17 – Evelyn Ankers, actress (died 1985)
- August 25 – Richard Greene, actor (died 1985)
- September 10 – Rin Tin Tin, canine actor (died 1932)
- September 13 – Dick Haymes, Argentine actor, singer (died 1980)
- September 16 - Branka Veselinović, Serbian actress (died 2023)
- September 21 – Rand Brooks, American actor (died 2003)
- September 24 - Audra Lindley, Amerist can actress (died 1997)
- September 28 – Arnold Stang, American actor and comedian (died 2009)
- October 9 – Lila Kedrova, Russian-born actress (died 2000)
- October 13
  - Yvette Thuot, Canadian actress (died 2021)
  - Robert Walker, actor (died 1951)
- October 17 – Rita Hayworth, actress (died 1987)
- October 23 - Peggy Moran, actress (died 2002)
- October 25 - Milton Selzer, actor (died 2005)
- October 27 – Teresa Wright, actress (died 2005)
- October 29 – Diana Serra Cary, born Peggy-Jean Montgomery ("Baby Peggy"), child silent film actress (died 2020)
- November 4
  - Art Carney, actor (died 2003)
  - Cameron Mitchell, actor (died 1994)
- November 27 - Stephen Elliott, actor (died 2005)
- November 30 – Efrem Zimbalist Jr., actor (died 2014)
- December 10 – Anne Gwynne, actress, model (died 2003)
- December 15 – Jeff Chandler, actor (died 1961)
- December 23 - Kumar Pallana, Indian-American character actress (died 2013)

== Deaths ==
- January 8 – Johannes Pääsuke, 25, Estonian photographer and director (train crash)
- January 12 – Simeon Wiltsie, American actor
- February 1 – Joseph Kaufman, 36, American silent film actor & director, married to film star Ethel Clayton
- February 15 – Vernon Castle, 30, American dancer & writer
- March 13 – William Courtleigh, Jr., 26, American actor
- April 30 – "Mother" Mary Maurice, 73, American veteran stage & film actress
- May 19 – Sidney Rankin Drew, 26, American actor and director.
- June 29 – John van den Broek, 23, Dutch cinematographer
- July 4 – Walter Stradling, 43, British cinematographer
- August 12 – Anna Held, 46, Polish actress & singer
- September 21 – Hal August, 28, American actor;
- October 2 - Edwin Arden, American stage & film actor
- October 19 – Harold Lockwood, 31, American actor
- October 22 – Myrtle Gonzalez, 27, American actress
- October 22 – Julian L'Estrange, 38, English actor
- October 28 – Louise Vale, American actress
- November 6 – William Shea, 67, Scottish veteran film actor & director
- November 18 – Wayland Trask Jr., 31, American comedian
- December 6 – Charles Gunn, 35, American actor
- December 29 – Jode Mullally, 32, American actor

== Film debuts ==
- Walter Abel – Out of a Clear Sky
- Renée Adorée – £500 Reward
- Erville Alderson – Her Man
- Lionel Atwill – Eve's Daughter
- Warner Baxter – All Woman
- Faire Binney – Sporting Life
- Ferike Boros – Her Boy
- William Boyd – Old Wives for New
- Joyce Carey – God and the Man
- Cyril Cusack – Knocknagow
- Karl Dane – My Four Years in Germany
- Marguerite De La Motte – Arizona
- Lya De Putti – The Emperor's Soldiers
- Maude Eburne – A Pair of Sixes
- Ágnes Esterházy – Palika
- Aristide Garbini – The Crusaders
- Ralph Graves – Men Who Have Made Love to Me
- Raymond Griffith – The Red-Haired Cupid
- Hale Hamilton – The Winning of Beatrice
- Neil Hamilton – The Beloved Impostor
- Phillips Holmes – Uneasy Money
- Lloyd Hughes – Love Me
- Rex Ingram – Tarzan of the Apes
- Allan Jeayes – Nelson
- Cecil Kellaway – Bond and Word
- Lila Lee – The Cruise of the Make-Believes
- Ben Lyon – The Transgressor
- Margaret Mann – The Heart of Humanity
- Teresa Maxwell-Conover – Just Sylvia
- Fay McKenzie – Station Content
- Robert Middlemass – Other Men's Daughters
- Loni Nest – The Story of Dida Ibsen
- Irene Rich – A Desert Wooing
- Will Rogers – Laughing Bill Hyde
- Elena Sangro – Fabiola
- Arthur Shields – Knocknagow
- Gloria Swanson – Society for Sale
- Ernest Thesiger – Nelson
- Tzwetta Tzatschewa – Die sterbenden Perlen
