= Helen Gilmore =

American actress (c. 1872–1936)

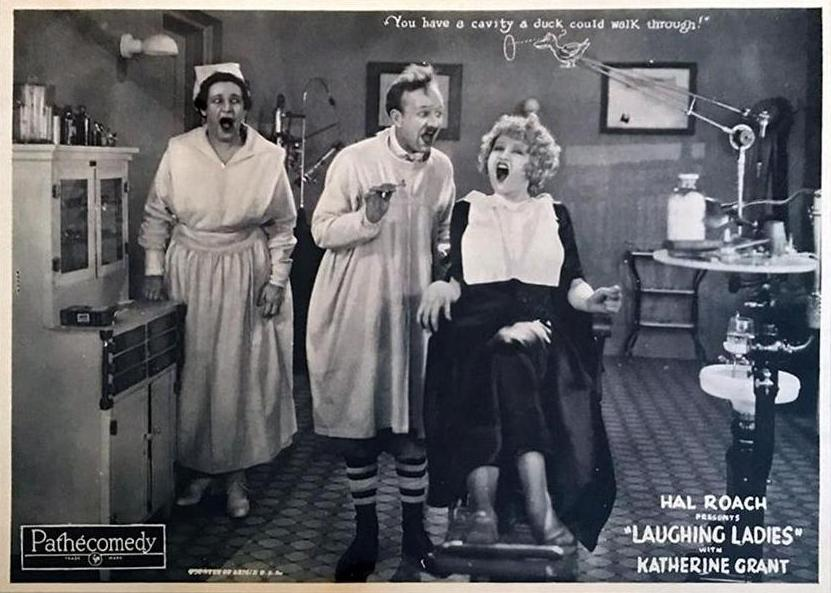
- Born: Antoinette Field c. 1872; Louisville, Kentucky, U.S.
- Died: April 1936 (aged 63-64); New York, New York, U.S.
- Occupation: Actress
- Years active: 1894–1932
- Spouse: Joseph B. Zahner (m. 1894; died 1900)

Helen Gilmore (born Antoinette A. Field, c. 1872 – April 1936) was an American actress of the stage and silent motion pictures from Louisville, Kentucky. She appeared in over 140 films between 1913 and 1932.

== Early life and career ==
In approximately 1872, Gilmore was born to Richard Field and Mary Cilia Daniels. In 1894, she toured with comic actor Stuart Robson's company, even substituting, on at least one occasion, for Mrs. Robson—the temporarily unavailable May Waldron—in the role of Adriana in Shakespeare's A Comedy of Errors. It was during that tour that Gilmore met and married fellow cast member (and fellow Kentuckian), Joseph B. Zahner, hurriedly tying the knot at New York's City Hall on Friday, July 13. Scarcely five years later, Zahner, then 33, suffered a fatal heart attack.

Between 1910 and 1913, Gilmore appeared on Broadway in 4 musical revues: Deems Taylor's The Echo, Manuel Klein's Around the World and Under Many Flags (both at the New York Hippodrome), and Oscar Straus's My Little Friend. Shortly thereafter, she made her screen debut in A Female Fagin.

As Mrs. Hobbs in A Petticoat Pilot (1918), Gilmore was commended for her careful character study. The Paramount Pictures film was directed by Rollin S. Sturgeon and was based on the novel by Evelyn Lincoln. She played the head nurse in Too Much Business (1922). This was a comedy which originated with a Saturday Evening Post story by Earl Derr Biggers. In it Gilmore was cast with Elsa Lorimer and Mack Fenton. Her final motion picture credit is for the role of a motorist in the Laurel and Hardy short Two Tars (1928).

== Theatre performances ==
Year	Play	Author	Character	Venue or Company	Notes
1893 – 1894	The Comedy of Errors	Shakespeare	Phryne, the reigning beauty of Ephesus; Adriana, wife to Antipholus of Ephesus (standby for May Waldron)	Touring with Stuart Robson	September 18, 1893 - July 7, 1894
1910	The Echo	Deems Taylor	Chorus	Globe Theatre	August 17, 1920 – October 1, 1920; 53 performances.
1911 – 1912	Around the World	Manuel Klein		New York Hippodrome	September 2, 1911 – May 18, 1912; 445 performances.
1912 – 1913	Under Many Flags	Manuel Klein		New York Hippodrome	August 31, 1912 – May 17, 1913; 445 performances.
1913	My Little Friend	Oscar Straus	Baroness DuBois	New Amsterdam Theatre	May 19 – June 24, 1913; 24 performances.

== Filmography ==
- A Female Fagin (1913) – The Female Fagin
- Notoriety (1914) (as Helen Field Gilmore)
- A Mexican Warrior (1914) – The Warrior's Mother-in-Law
- The Eagle's Mate (1914) – Hagar Morne (as Helen Gillmore)
- The Earl of Pawtucket (1915) – Aunt Jane Putnam
- This Way Out (1916)
- Their Wedding Day (1916) – Mrs. Findem
- The Rivals (1916 film) (1916) – The Lumber King's Wife
- The Pretenders (1916)
- Never Again (1916) – Mrs. Dale
- For Better or Worse (1916) – Mrs. Gothrox
- Will a Woman Tell? (1916) –
- Wait a Minute (1916) – Jane Higgs
- Life Savers (1916) – Old Maid
- Comrades (1916) – The Landlady
- The Reward (1916) – Mabel's Mother
- A Bag of Trouble (1916) – Mrs. Pokes
- Jerry's Double Header (1916) – Mother
- Jerry's Winning Way (1917) – The Landlady
- Jerry's Big Doings (1917) – The Mother
- Jerry's Brilliant Scheme (1917) – Her Mother
- Jerry's Romance (1917) – Lady Isabelle
- The Flying Target (1917) – Jane
- Jerry's Triple Alliance (1917) – The Housekeeper
- Tom Sawyer (1917) – Widow Douglas
- A Petticoat Pilot (1918) – Mrs. Hobbs
- Huck and Tom (1918) – Widow Douglas
- On the Jump (1918) – Girl's Mother
- Follow the Crowd (1918) –
- Pipe the Whiskers (1918)
- It's a Wild Life (1918)
- Hey There! (1918)
- Kicked Out (1918)
- Two-Gun Gussie (1918) – (uncredited)
- The City Slicker (1918)
- Sic 'Em, Towser (1918)
- Are Crooks Dishonest? (1918) – Old lady in park
- An Ozark Romance (1918)
- Kicking the Germ Out of Germany (1918) –
- That's Him (1918)
- Bride and Gloom (1918) –
- Two Scrambled (1918)
- Bees in His Bonnet (1918)
- Why Pick on Me? (1918) –
- Nothing But Trouble (1918) –
- Take a Chance (1918) – Landlady (uncredited)
- Ring Up the Curtain (1919) – Manager's Wife (uncredited)
- Just Neighbors (1919) – Old Woman with Packages (uncredited)
- Bumping Into Broadway (1919) – 'Bearcat' the Landlady
- Captain Kidd's Kids (1919) – The Girl's Mother
- From Hand to Mouth (1919) – Hag (uncredited)
- His Royal Slyness (1920) – Queen of Thermosa (uncredited)
- A Bashful Bigamist (1920) – Uncle Oswald's Wife
- Fickle Women (1920) – Mrs. Cullison
- Down Home (1920) – Townswoman
- The Blazing Trail (1921) – Village Talking Machine
- Judge Her Not (1921) – Jerusha Spriggins
- Dangerous Paths (1921) – Deborah Hammond
- Never Weaken (1921)
- Too Much Business (1922) – The Head Nurse
- Impulse (1922) – Mrs. Cameron
- One Terrible Day (1922) – Carlene Culpepper (uncredited)
- Our Gang (1922) – Emil's Wife (uncredited)
- Good Men and True (1922) – Mrs. Fite
- Newly Rich (1922)
- Tight Shoes (1923)
- Safety Last! (1923) – Department Store Customer (uncredited)
- Boys to Board (1923) – Mother Malone
- Kill or Cure (1923) – Aggressive non-customer
- Post No Bills (1923)
- No Noise (1923) – Nurse
- Jus' Passin' Through (1923)
- Stage Fright (1923) – Mickey's Mother
- The Whole Truth (1923) – The Wife
- Sunday Calm (1923) – Mrs. McTeeter
- Mother's Joy (1923) – Dippy
- It's a Joy! (1923) – His Mother-in-Law
- The Cowboy Sheik (1924) – Gussie the Cook
- Just a Minute (1924) – Caroline - the Mayor's Wife
- Postage Due (1924)
- The Fraidy Cat (1924) – Lem Tucker's Mother
- Zeb vs. Paprika (1924)
- Seein' Things (1924) – Baby's Mother
- Commencement Day (1924) – Joe's Mother
- Near Dublin (1924) – Villager
- April Fool (1924) – Jackie's Mother
- Stolen Goods (1924) – Shopper (uncredited)
- Our Congressman (1924) – The Dowager Lady Hemingway Abbott
- It's a Bear (1924) – Farmer's Wife
- Short Kilts (1924) – Mrs. McHungry
- Sittin' Pretty (1924) – Undetermined secondary role (uncredited)
- Should Landlords Live? (1924)
- Every Man for Himself (1924) – Pedestrian
- Bungaloo Boobs (1924) – The Neighbor's Wife
- Fast Company (1924) – Woman from Traveler's Aid Society
- All Wet (1924) – Boarding House Landlady (uncredited)
- Meet the Missus (1924)
- The Wages of Tin (1925) – Meg's Mother
- The Rat's Knuckles (1925) – Diner (uncredited)
- The Big Town (1925) – Train Passenger (uncredited)
- The Haunted Honeymoon (1925)
- The Love Bug (1925) – Beauty Parlor Customer
- Whose Baby Are You? (1925) – Train Passenger (uncredited)
- Big Red Riding Hood (1925) – Book Buyer / Red Riding Hood in Fantasy
- Wild Papa (1925)
- Chasing the Chaser (1925) – The Neighbor
- Sherlock Sleuth (1925) – Haughty Guest's Wife
- Tame Men and Wild Women (1925) – Arthur's Mother
- Mary, Queen of Tots (1925) – Dollmaker's wife
- Unfriendly Enemies (1925) – Laughing Woman
- Moonlight and Noses (1925)
- Should Sailors Marry? (1925) – Train Passenger
- Laughing Ladies (1925)
- Starvation Blues (1925)
- His Wooden Wedding (1925) – Dressmaker (uncredited)
- Tol'able Romeo (1925)
- What's the World Coming To? (1926) – A Neighbor
- Your Husband's Past (1926)
- Madame Mystery (1926)
- Baby Clothes (1926) – Joe's Mother
- Say It with Babies (1926)
- Don Key (Son of Burro) (1926)
- Long Fliv the King (1926) – Helga's Lady-in-Waiting (uncredited)
- Never Too Old (1926)
- Merry Widower (1926)
- Should Husbands Pay? (1926)
- Sensation Seekers (1927)
- Mad Scrambles (1927)
- The Eyes Have It (1928)
- Idle Eyes (1928)
- Their Purple Moment (1928)
- Seein' Things (1928)
- Two Tars (1928) – Motorist
- Shivering Shakespeare (1930) – Woman in Audience (uncredited)
- The Real McCoy (1930) – Townswoman (uncredited)
- Any Old Port! (1932) – Spectator (uncredited)
