= Swing Your Partners =

1918 film

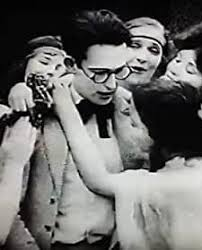
- Directed by: Alfred J. Goulding
- Produced by: Hal Roach
- Starring: Harold Lloyd
- Production company: Rolin Films
- Distributed by: Pathé Exchange
- Release date: September 29, 1918
- Running time: 1 reel
- Country: United States
- Language: Silent (English intertitles)

Swing Your Partners is a 1918 American silent comedy short film featuring Harold Lloyd. Copies of the film survive in two collections.

== Plot ==
Harold and Snub are two vagrants who are mistaken for visiting dance experts by the proprietor of Professor Tanglefoot's Dance Academy because of their startling resemblance to them. Harold teaches a class of female pupils a few interesting and lively dance steps before the real pair of experts arrive.

== Cast ==
- Harold Lloyd
- Snub Pollard
- Bebe Daniels
- William Blaisdell
- Sammy Brooks
- Lige Conley (credited as Lige Cromley)
- William Gillespie
- Bud Jamison

== Reception ==
Like many American films of the time, Swing Your Partners was subject to cuts by city and state film censorship boards. For example, the Chicago Board of Censors required a cut of two near views of Lloyd on a piano stool facing the camera.

== See also ==
- Harold Lloyd filmography
