= On the Jump =

1918 film

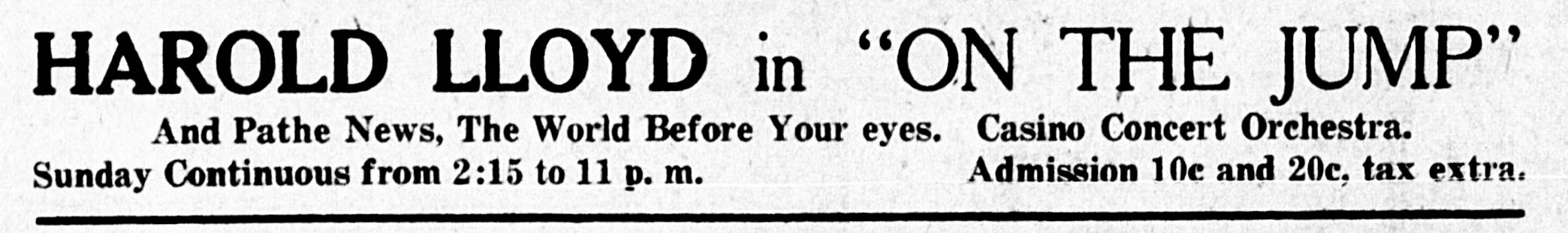
- Contemporary newspaper advertisement for the film.
- Directed by: Alfred J. Goulding
- Starring: Harold Lloyd
- Production company: Rolin Films
- Distributed by: Pathé Exchange
- Release date: March 31, 1918
- Running time: 10 minutes
- Country: United States
- Language: Silent (English intertitles)

On the Jump is a 1918 American silent comedy short film featuring Harold Lloyd. A print of the film survives in the film archive of the Museum of Modern Art in New York City. Like many American films of the time, On the Jump was subject to cuts by city and state film censorship boards. For example, the Chicago Board of Censors cut the scene of the man thumbing his nose.

== Cast ==
- Harold Lloyd
- Snub Pollard
- Bebe Daniels
- William Blaisdell
- Sammy Brooks
- Lige Conley (credited as Lige Cromley)
- Billy Fay
- Helen Gilmore
- Lew Harvey
- June Havoc (credited as June Hovick)
- Gus Leonard
- James Parrott
- Charles Stevenson (credited as Charles E. Stevenson)

== See also ==
- Harold Lloyd filmography
