= Beat It (film) =

1918 film

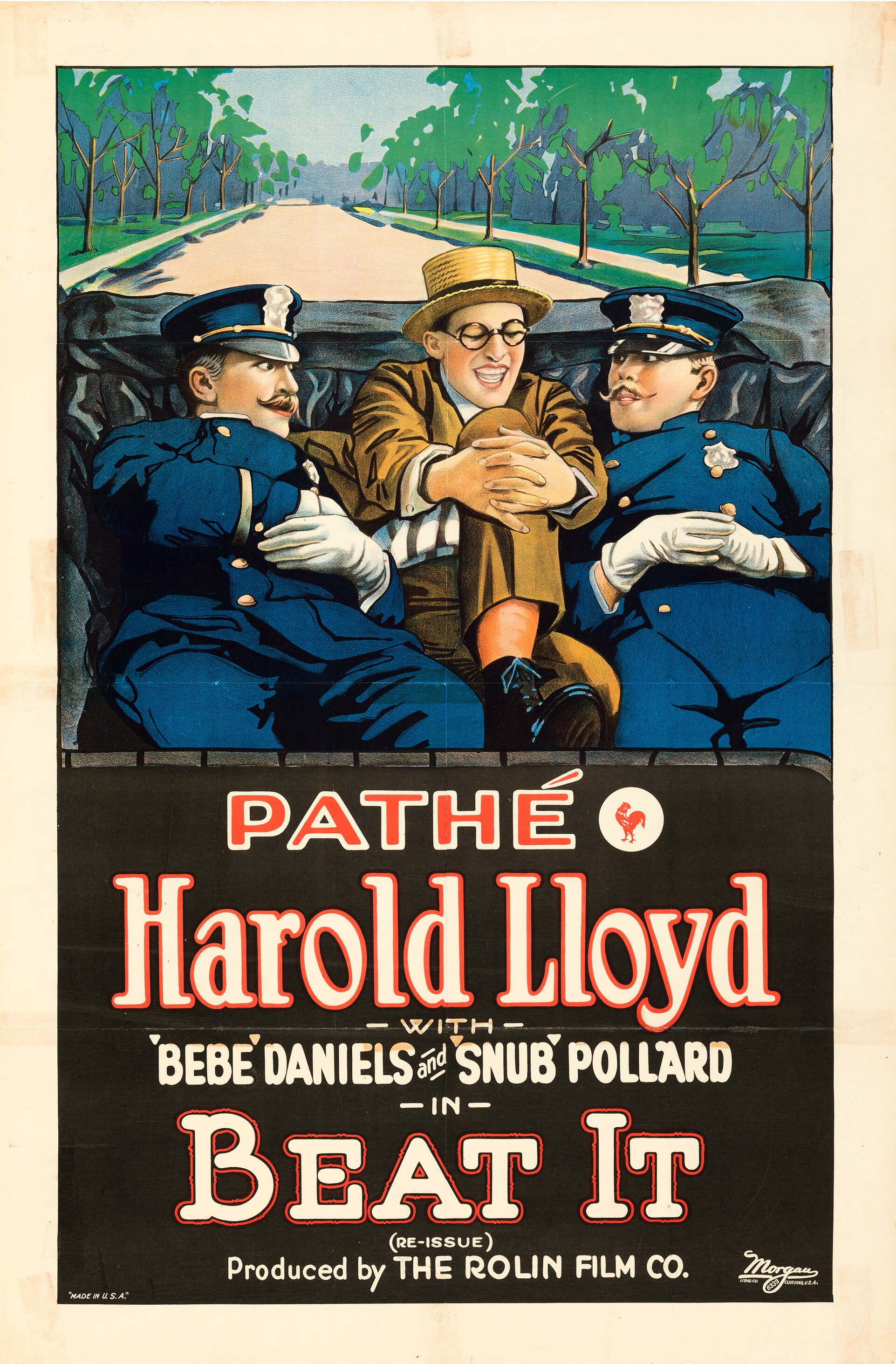
- Film poster
- Directed by: Gilbert Pratt
- Written by: H. M. Walker
- Produced by: Hal Roach
- Starring: Harold Lloyd
- Cinematography: Walter Lundin
- Distributed by: Pathé Exchange
- Release date: February 24, 1918
- Running time: 10 minutes
- Country: United States
- Languages: Silent; English intertitles

Beat It is a 1918 American silent comedy short film featuring Harold Lloyd. A print of Beat It exists.

== Cast ==
- Harold Lloyd
- Snub Pollard
- Bebe Daniels
- William Blaisdell
- Sammy Brooks
- Lige Conley (as Lige Cromley)
- William Gillespie
- Maynard Laswell (as M.A. Laswell)
- Gus Leonard
- Belle Mitchell
- William Strohbach (as William Strawback)
- Dorothea Wolbert
- King Zany (as Charles Dill)
