= Let's Go (1918 film) =

1918 film

- Directed by: Alfred J. Goulding
- Produced by: Hal Roach
- Starring: Harold Lloyd
- Distributed by: Pathé Exchange
- Release date: March 24, 1918
- Running time: 10 minutes
- Country: United States
- Languages: Silent; English intertitles

Let's Go is a 1918 American silent comedy short film featuring Harold Lloyd. A print of Let's Go exists.

== Cast ==
- Harold Lloyd
- Snub Pollard
- Bebe Daniels
- William Blaisdell
- Sammy Brooks
- Lige Conley - (as Lige Cromley)
- Billy Fay
- Gus Leonard
- James Parrott
- Dorothea Wolbert
