= Look Pleasant, Please =

1918 film

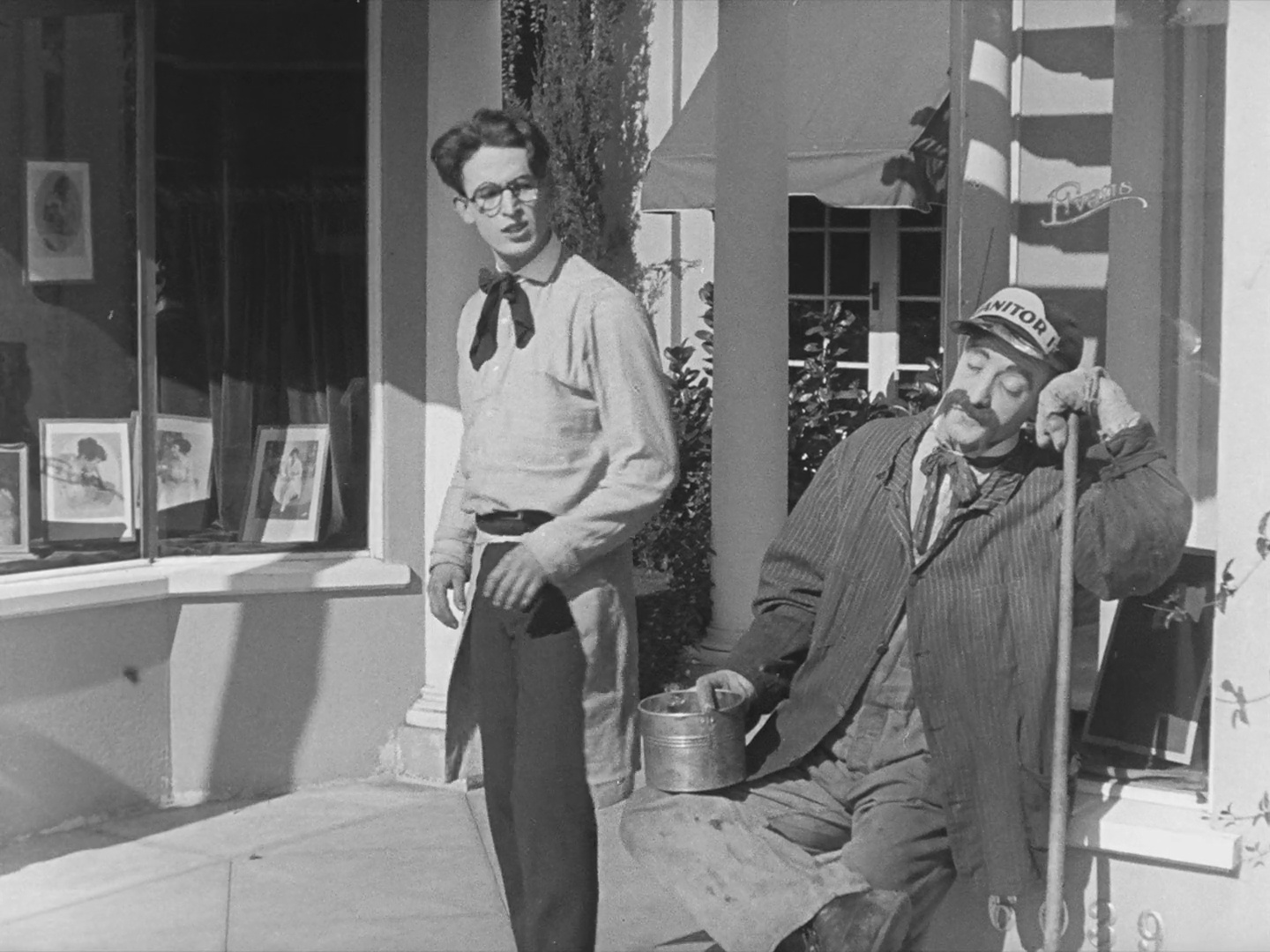
- Directed by: Alfred J. Goulding
- Written by: H. M. Walker
- Produced by: Hal Roach
- Starring: Harold Lloyd
- Cinematography: Walter Lundin
- Production company: Rolin Films
- Distributed by: Pathé Exchange
- Release date: March 10, 1918
- Running time: 1 reel
- Country: United States
- Language: Silent (English intertitles)

Look Pleasant, Please is a 1918 American silent comedy short film featuring Harold Lloyd. A print of the film is held by the Museum of Modern Art in New York City.

== Plot ==
Look Pleasant, Please (1918)

Bebe is one of a group of females who go to a photographer's studio to have their pictures taken. The amorous photographer has "frolicky fingers". When he gets too friendly with Bebe, she telephones her husband who vows to come to the studio to murder the photographer. Shortly afterward, Harold, a dishonest greengrocer, is pursued by a group of policemen. During his flight from them, he happens to enter the photographer's studio. Initially the photographer mistakes Harold for Bebe's irate husband. When he realizes that Harold is harmless, the photographer tells Harold he can have the run of the studio—in the hopes that Bebe's husband will think that Harold is the photographer. Harold attempts to photograph an old woman, a group of three drunkards and a pretty chorus girl before the jealous husband arrives. A large scuffle ensues. Eventually the husband is arrested and Harold and Bebe are photographed together.

== Cast ==
- Harold Lloyd
- Snub Pollard
- Bebe Daniels
- William Blaisdell
- Sammy Brooks
- Lige Conley (credited as Lige Cromley)
- Billy Fay
- William Gillespie
- Lew Harvey
- Gus Leonard
- James Parrott
- Dorothea Wolbert

== Reception ==
Like many American films of the time, Look Pleasant, Please was subject to cuts by city and state film censorship boards. For example, the Chicago Board of Censors cut the man lying on the floor looking at the young woman's legs and sticking a man with a hairpin and the vulgar actions following.

== See also ==
- Harold Lloyd filmography
