= Fireman Save My Child =

Fireman Save My Child may refer to:

- Fireman Save My Child (1918 film), an American silent short comedy starring Harold Lloyd
- Fireman, Save My Child (1927 film), an American silent comedy featuring Wallace Beery and Raymond Hatton
- Fireman, Save My Child (1932 film), an American comedy starring Joe E. Brown
- Fireman Save My Child (1954 film), an American comedy starring Hugh O'Brian and Buddy Hackett
