= Never Touched Me =

1919 film

- Directed by: Alfred J. Goulding
- Produced by: Hal Roach
- Starring: Harold Lloyd
- Production company: Rolin Films
- Distributed by: Pathé Exchange
- Release date: July 27, 1919
- Running time: 8 minutes
- Country: United States
- Language: Silent (English intertitles)

Never Touched Me is a 1919 American silent comedy short film featuring Harold Lloyd. A print exists in the Staatliches Filmarchive.

== Plot ==
Harold is one of several suitors attempting to woo Bebe. Several fights break out among the hopefuls at Bebe's home. Eventually she and Harold leave quickly on foot while being hotly pursued by the rest. Bebe leads Harold into a cafe where she is a dancer billed as "The Princess of Sapphire". Harold is mistaken as an orchestra leader and comically leads the band in a tune, all the while trying to avoid being struck by a trombonist's instrument. The most belligerent of Harold's rivals eventually puts him is a violent choke hold after he sees Harold come out of Bebe's dressing room. Harold is rescued by the police who inform him that the suitor who was choking him was a wanted man.

== Cast ==
- Harold Lloyd
- Snub Pollard
- Bebe Daniels
- Sammy Brooks
- Lige Conley (as Lige Cromley)
- Billy Fay
- Lew Harvey
- Wallace Howe
- James T. Kelley
- Noah Young

== See also ==
- Harold Lloyd filmography
