= A Gasoline Wedding =

1918 film

- Directed by: Alfred J. Goulding
- Written by: H. M. Walker
- Produced by: Hal Roach
- Starring: Harold Lloyd
- Cinematography: Walter Lundin
- Distributed by: Pathé Exchange
- Release date: March 3, 1918
- Running time: 9 minutes
- Country: United States
- Languages: Silent; English intertitles

A Gasoline Wedding is a 1918 American silent comedy short film starring Harold Lloyd and Bebe Daniels.

== Plot summary ==
The film

Marital mayhem ensues when a poor boy attempts to woo the daughter of a wealthy man.

== Cast ==
- Harold Lloyd as The Boy
- Snub Pollard
- Bebe Daniels
- William Blaisdell
- Sammy Brooks
- Lige Conley (credited as Lige Cromley)
- William Gillespie
- Maynard Laswell (credited as M.A. Laswell)
- James Parrott

== Plot ==
Harold plays a poor boy intent on wooing well-to-do Bebe. Her father would prefer she marry a much older but wealthy suitor whom Bebe considers to be a "neanderthal". When Bebe hears her father concocting a kidnapping plot with the rich suitor, she dresses her butler in her clothes and flees with Harold. Both couples arrive at the minister's house. The rich suitor does not realize he has actually "married" the butler until Harold and Bebe are wed.

== Reception ==
Like many American films of the time, A Gasoline Wedding was subject to cuts by city and state film censorship boards. For example, the Chicago Board of Censors required a cut of two closeups of a coin.

== Survival status ==
Prints of the film are held in the UCLA Film & Television Archive and the BFI National Archive.

== See also ==
- Harold Lloyd filmography
