= It's a Wild Life =

1918 film

- Directed by: Gilbert Pratt
- Produced by: Hal Roach
- Starring: Harold Lloyd
- Distributed by: Pathé Exchange
- Release date: April 21, 1918
- Running time: 10 minutes
- Country: United States
- Languages: Silent; English intertitles

It's a Wild Life is a 1918 American silent comedy short film featuring Harold Lloyd.

== Cast ==
- Harold Lloyd
- Snub Pollard
- Bebe Daniels
- William Blaisdell
- Sammy Brooks
- Lige Conley
- Helen Gilmore
- Lew Harvey
- Bud Jamison
- Fred C. Newmeyer
- James Parrott
- Charles Stevenson

== Plot ==
Harold attempts to court Bebe but he is turned away from Bebe's home by her mother who tells Harold that her daughter will only date a banker or a councilman. Bebe's father arranges for Snub to date his daughter as he fits the criteria for an acceptable suitor. Harold follows Bebe, Snub and Bebe's parents to a dance hall where Bebe is pleased to see him. Harold distracts the others long enough to have an energetic dance with Bebe. Harold then gets into an extended fight with both Snub and Bebe's father. Eventually all the dance hall patrons become involved in the fighting. The police are summoned. The dance hall manager eventually turns out the lights on the brawlers as the fight shows no signs of subsiding.

== Reception ==
In a review on April 20, 1918, Motion Picture News, wrote that the film was "perhaps, Harold Lloyd’s funniest single reel comedy...It has a laugh in practically every scene, and there is a plentiful supply of good business...adding considerably thereby to the gaiety of nations."

== See also ==
- Harold Lloyd filmography
