= That's Him =

1918 film

- Directed by: Gilbert Pratt
- Produced by: Hal Roach
- Starring: Harold Lloyd
- Distributed by: Pathé Exchange
- Release date: August 4, 1918
- Running time: 11 minutes
- Country: United States
- Languages: Silent; English intertitles

That's Him is a 1918 American silent comedy short film featuring Harold Lloyd. The film survives in a 28mm print down.

== Cast ==
- Harold Lloyd
- Snub Pollard
- Bebe Daniels
- Lige Conley
- William Gillespie
- Helen Gilmore
- Lew Harvey
- Gus Leonard
- Marie Mosquini
- James Parrott
- Charles Stevenson

== See also ==
- Harold Lloyd filmography
