= Why Pick on Me? =

Why Pick on Me? can refer to:

- Why Pick on Me? (1918 film), a 1918 American film
- Why Pick on Me? (1937 film), a 1937 British film
