= Step Lively (1917 film) =

1917 film

- Directed by: Alfred J. Goulding
- Written by: H. M. Walker
- Produced by: Hal Roach
- Starring: Harold Lloyd
- Edited by: Della Mullady
- Production company: Rolin Films
- Distributed by: Pathé Exchange
- Release date: December 30, 1917
- Running time: 1 reel
- Country: United States
- Languages: Silent; English intertitles

Step Lively is a 1917 American silent comedy short film featuring Harold Lloyd. A print of the film at the UCLA Film & Television Archive. Like many American films of the time, Step Lively was subject to cuts by city and state film censorship boards. For example, the Chicago Board of Censors required two views of a quarter to be cut.

== Cast ==
- Harold Lloyd
- Snub Pollard
- Bebe Daniels
- W.L. Adams
- William Blaisdell
- Sammy Brooks
- Lige Conley (credited as Lige Cromley)
- Billy Fay
- William Gillespie
- Bud Jamison
- Gus Leonard
- Fred C. Newmeyer
- Charles Stevenson (credited as Charles E. Stevenson)
