= Luke Wins Ye Ladye Faire =

1917 film by Hal Roach

- Directed by: Hal Roach
- Produced by: Hal Roach
- Starring: Harold Lloyd
- Release date: February 25, 1917
- Country: United States
- Languages: Silent; English intertitles

Luke Wins Ye Ladye Faire is a 1917 American short comedy film starring Harold Lloyd.

== Cast ==
- Harold Lloyd - Lonesome Luke
- Bebe Daniels
- Snub Pollard
- Bud Jamison
- Charles Stevenson - (as Charles E. Stevenson)
- W.L. Adams
- Estelle Harrison
- Sidney De Gray
- Gus Leonard
- Lottie Case
- Dorothea Wolbert - (as Dorothy Wolbert)
- Maybelle Beringer
- Brownie Brownell
- Rose Eghers
- Alice Davenport - (as Mrs. Davenport)
- Clara Lucas
- George F. Marion
- H. Smith

== See also ==
- Harold Lloyd filmography
