= Bees in His Bonnet =

1918 film

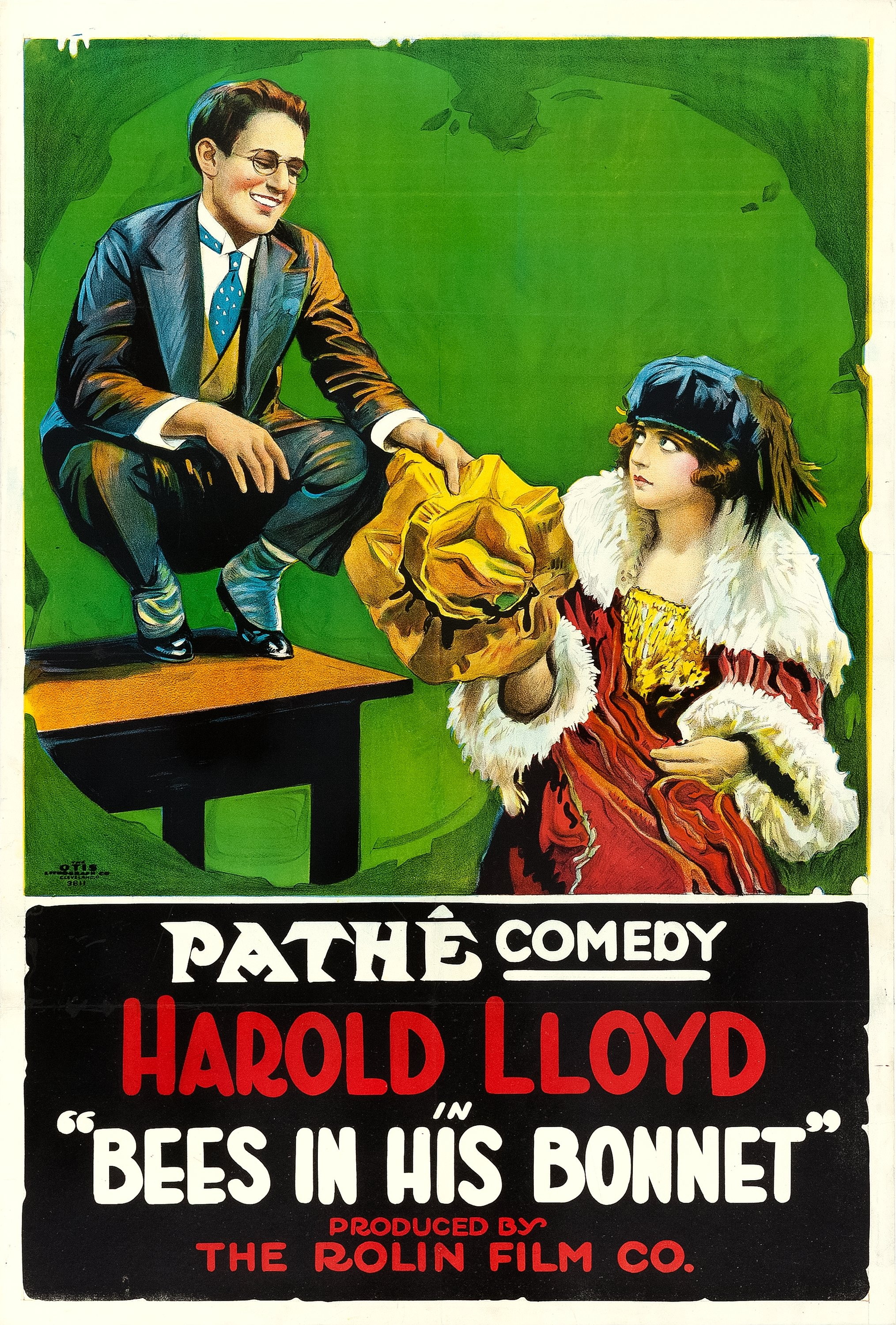
- Film poster
- Directed by: Gilbert Pratt
- Produced by: Hal Roach
- Starring: Harold Lloyd
- Release date: September 15, 1918
- Running time: 1 reel
- Country: United States
- Language: Silent with English intertitles

Bees in His Bonnet is a 1918 American short comedy film featuring Harold Lloyd. It is presumed to be lost.

== Cast ==
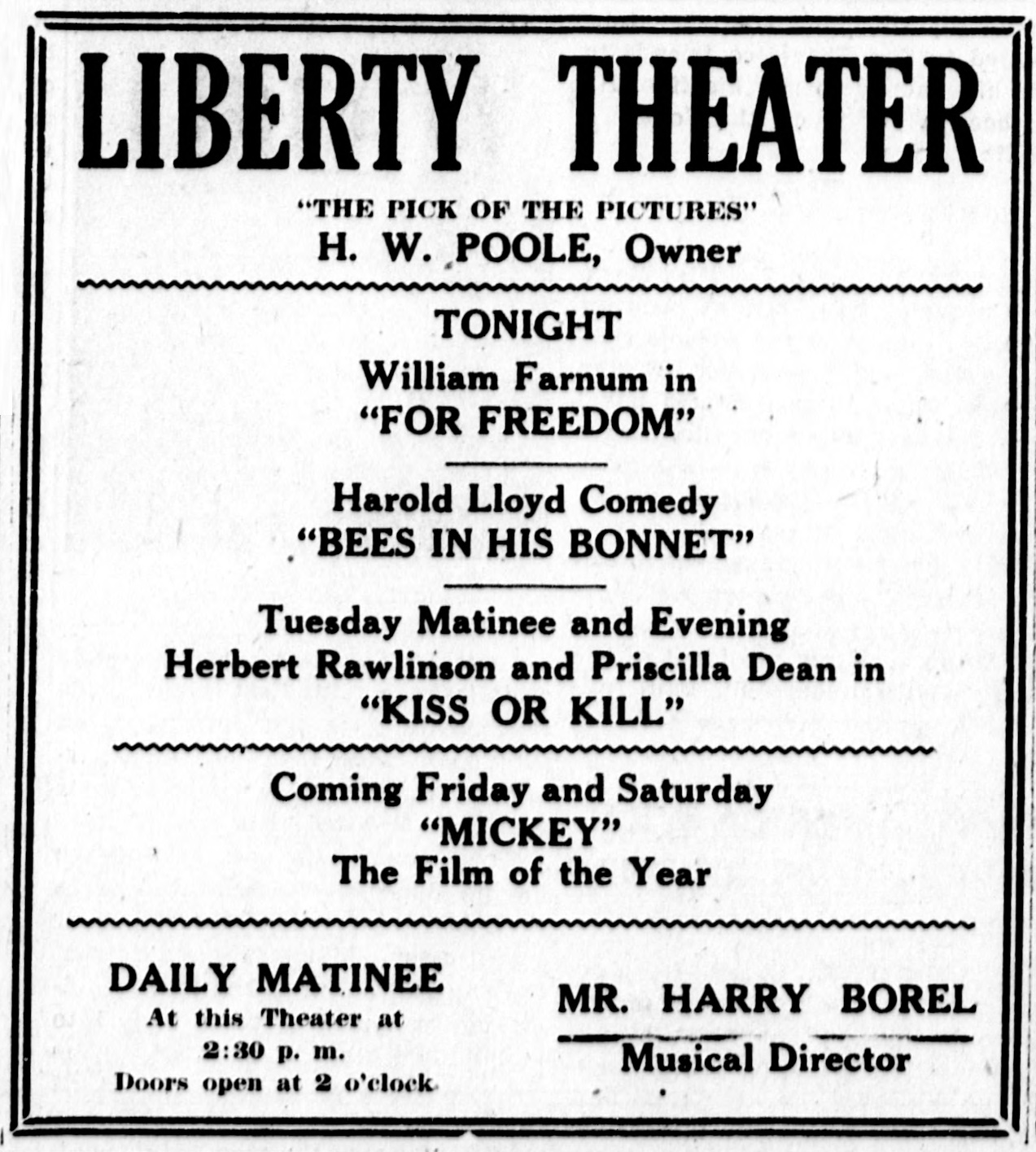
A contemporary newspaper advertisement for Bees in His Bonnet and two other films.

- Harold Lloyd
- Snub Pollard
- Bebe Daniels
- William Blaisdell
- Sammy Brooks
- Lige Conley (credited as Lige Cromley)
- William Gillespie
- Helen Gilmore
- Bud Jamison
- Charles Stevenson
- Noah Young

== See also ==
- List of American films of 1918
- Harold Lloyd filmography
- List of lost films
