= Alfred J. Goulding =

American film director (1885–1972)

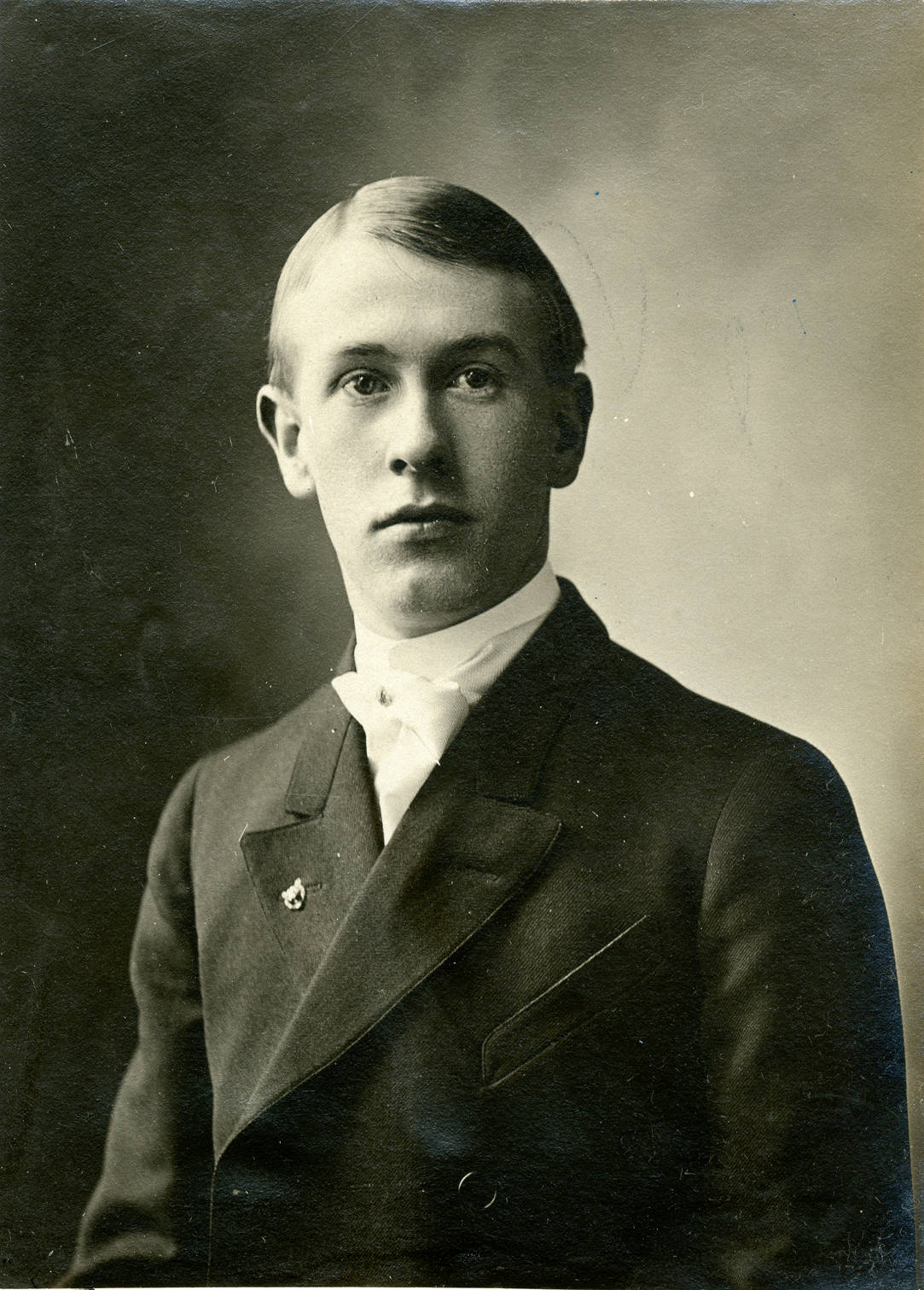
- Goulding circa 1905
- Born: Alfred John Goulding; January 26, 1885; Melbourne, Australia
- Died: April 25, 1972 (aged 87); Hollywood, California, USA
- Occupations: Film director Screenwriter
- Years active: 1917–1959
- Spouses: Gladys Watson (m. 1911; died 1920) Hazel Marcella O'Brien (m. 1920; div. 1925) Audrey F. Faught (m. 1925; div. 1933) Dorothea Lillian Siglow (m. 1934; div. 1941) Betty Saunders (m. 1952)
- Children: Alfred John Goulding Jr. (1917–1991) Aldra M. Rose Goulding (1926–?); Frank McGinnis Goulding (1928–1979); Gary Clay Leroy Goulding (1929–2002)
- Parent(s): Francis Thomas Goulding; Margaret Davies Walsh

Silent film Park your car (1920) by Goulding for Rolin Films. Running time: 08:57. A one-act farce about two neighbours who purchase a car that they can use to go on drives with their wives.

Alfred John "Alf" Goulding (January 26, 1885 – April 25, 1972) was an Australian-born vaudevillian, who became an American film director and screenwriter. He directed more than 180 films between 1917 and 1959 and is credited with having Harold Lloyd wear his trademark glasses.

== Biography ==
He was born on January 26, 1885, in Melbourne, Australia to Francis Thomas Goulding (1860–1940) and Margaret Davies Walsh. He was the youngest brother of the opera singer Elsa Goulding.

As children, he and his brother and sister performed with Pollard’s Lilliputian Opera Company, a popular Australian juvenile opera company that travelled Australasia, the Orient and North America extensively. By 1900 he was regularly singled out in reviews as one of the company’s most entertaining performers: "Master Alf. Goulding came in for a lion's share of applause, and he certainly won it fairly in his comic pieces." By 1907, Goulding was stage managing for the company. He arrived with the Pollard troupe in the US in 1908. According to Brent Walker, Goulding then travelled to Britain where he worked on stage with Stan Laurel, for several years, after which he returned to the US. By 1911 he was performing on stage in North America and directing his own stage shows, sometimes in collaboration with former Pollard performers Daphne Pollard and Harry "Snub" Pollard.

In 1912, he broke into movies, acting and then after 1916, directing two reel comedies for Fox. He then joined Hal Roach, directing many Harold Lloyd shorts. Throughout the 1920s and early 1930s his work output was significant, and he directed the likes of Harry Langdon, Norma Shearer, Leon Errol, Edgar Kennedy and Fatty Arbuckle, in addition to films starring former Pollard players Daphne Pollard and Snub Pollard Between 1935 and 1938 he worked in Britain again. In 1939 he re-entered the United States illegally and was jailed as an alien. By 1940, he was again a resident of Australia. He wrote and directed a wartime feature made in Australia in 1942, A Yank in Australia, which was not a success.

Goulding directed one of Laurel and Hardy's final films at the Hal Roach Studios, A Chump at Oxford, released in 1940. He later worked in Britain and directed several second features in the late 1940s and early 1950s, one of them being the first of a series of Dick Barton films starring Don Stannard. His final film was Laffing Time which he directed in 1959. He had by this time, over 180 directorial credits to his name.

He died in Hollywood, California, from pneumonia on April 5, 1972.

== Marriages ==
1. He married Gladys Watson (1891–1920) on October 28, 1911, in Seattle, Washington. She died on April 19, 1920, in Hollywood, California.
2. On June 17, 1920, in Glendale, California, he married Hazel Marcella O'Brien (1892–1935) and they divorced around 1925.
3. His third marriage was on December 8, 1925, when he married Audrey H. Faught (1910–1972) in Vancouver, British Columbia, Canada. She was 25 years younger than him. They divorced in 1933; she claimed that he beat her and drank excessively. She was awarded custody of their three children.
4. He married actress Diana Seaby (1914–1963) (born Dorothea Lillian Siglow) in Mexico in 1934. They married again in San Bernardino, California, on July 30, 1934, to ensure that the marriage was legal in the United States. She was 29 years younger than him. They divorced in 1941 in Dade County, Florida.
5. He married his last wife, Rita J. Lunniss (1927–1980) in 1952 in Middlesex, England. She later changed her name to Betty Goulding.

== Selected filmography ==
- By the Sad Sea Waves (1917)
- Bliss (1917)
- All Aboard (1917)
- Bashful (1917)
- Step Lively (1917)
- A Gasoline Wedding (1918)
- Look Pleasant, Please (1918)
- Let's Go (1918)
- On the Jump (1918)
- Follow the Crowd (1918)
- Pipe the Whiskers (1918)
- Hey There! (1918)
- Kicked Out (1918)
- Two-Gun Gussie (1918)
- Fireman Save My Child (1918)
- Somewhere in Turkey (1918)
- An Ozark Romance (1918)
- Kicking the Germ Out of Germany (1918)
- Bride and Gloom (1918)
- Swing Your Partners (1918)
- Take a Chance (1918)
- The Dutiful Dub (1919)
- Crack Your Heels (1919)
- Ring Up the Curtain (1919)
- Si, Senor (1919)
- The Marathon (1919)
- Pistols for Breakfast (1919)
- Off the Trolley (1919)
- Never Touched Me (1919)
- Count Your Change (1919)
- Heap Big Chief (1919)
- Don't Shove (1919)
- From Hand to Mouth (1919)
- Learning to Love (1925)
- Don't (1925)
- Atta Boy (1926)
- Should Men Walk Home? (1927)
- The Honorable Mr. Buggs (1927)
- Hey, Pop! (1932)
- Buzzin' Around (1933)
- How've You Bean? (1933)
- Everything Is Rhythm (1936)
- Splinters in the Air (1937)
- Sam Small Leaves Town (1937)
- The Gang Show (1938)
- Olympic Honeymoon (1940)
- A Chump at Oxford (1940)
- A Yank in Australia (1942)
- Dick Barton: Special Agent (1948)
- The Dark Road (1948)
- The Devil's Jest (1954)
- Laffing Time (1959)
