= Moonlight and Noses =

1925 American film

Moonlight And Noses
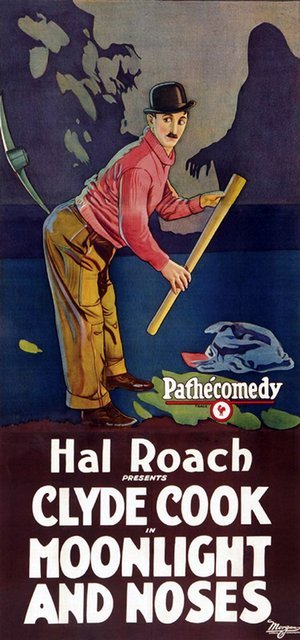
- Film poster
- Directed by: Stan Laurel
- Written by: Carl Harbaugh; Stan Laurel; Rob Wagner; H. M. Walker
- Produced by: Hal Roach
- Starring: Clyde Cook; Noah Young
- Cinematography: Harry W. Gerstad; R.H. Weller
- Distributed by: Pathé Exchange
- Release date: October 4, 1925
- Running time: 20 minutes
- Country: United States
- Language: Silent (English intertitles)

Moonlight And Noses is a 1925 American silent comedy film directed by Stan Laurel and starring Clyde Cook. This is the first film of Clyde Cook series produced by Hal Raoch. The film's title is a wordplay of Moonlight and Roses, a popular melody that had been named and republished in 1921.

== Cast ==
- Clyde Cook as a burglar.
- Noah Young as a burglar.
- James Finlayson as Professor Sniff.
- Fay Wray as Miss Sniff, the Professor's Daughter.
- Tyler Brooke as Ashley, the Daughter's Sweetheart.
- Marjorie Whiteis
- Helen Gilmore
- William Gillespie
- Jules Mendel
