= Off the Trolley =

1919 film

- Directed by: Alfred J. Goulding
- Produced by: Hal Roach
- Starring: Harold Lloyd
- Release date: June 22, 1919
- Running time: 7 minutes
- Country: United States
- Language: Silent with English intertitles

Off the Trolley is a 1919 American silent comedy short film featuring Harold Lloyd.

== Plot ==
Bebe and Snub are employees on a trolley car. Harold sneaks the fare from Bebe's coin dispenser to board the vehicle for the purpose of romantically pursuing her. Among other adventures, Harold ends up helping to foil an armed robbery of the trolley by two bandits.

== Cast ==
- Harold Lloyd
- Snub Pollard
- Bebe Daniels
- Sammy Brooks
- Billy Fay
- Lew Harvey
- Wallace Howe
- Bud Jamison
- Gus Leonard
- Marie Mosquini
- Fred C. Newmeyer
- James Parrott
- Dorothea Wolbert
- Noah Young

== See also ==
- Harold Lloyd filmography
