= Dorothea Wolbert =

American actress (1874–1958)

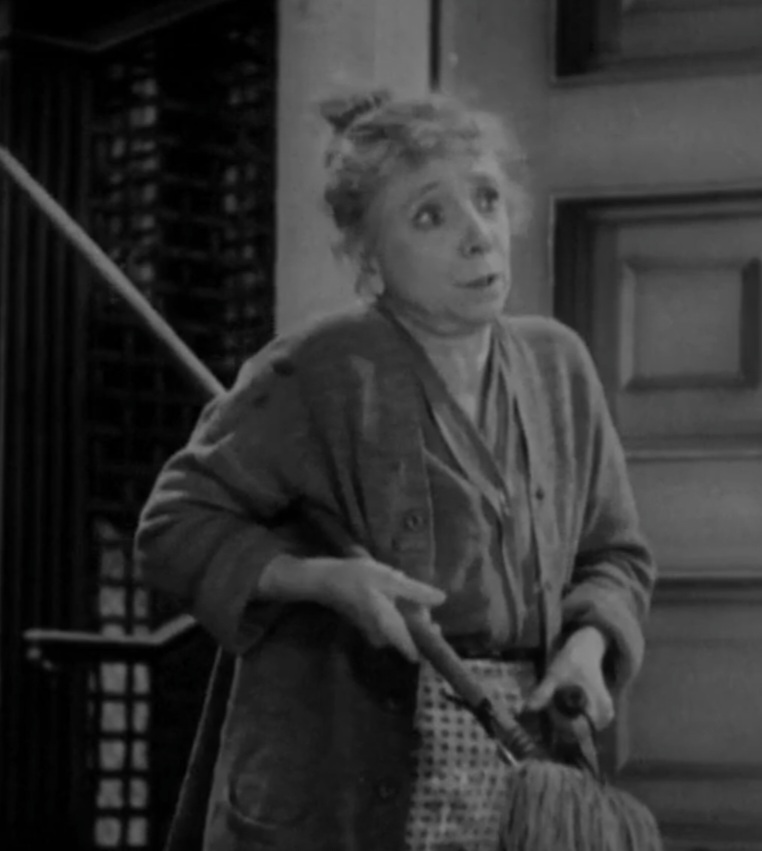
- Wolbert in The Front Page (1931)
- Born: April 12, 1874; Philadelphia, Pennsylvania, U.S.
- Died: September 15, 1958 (aged 84); Hollywood, California, U.S.
- Occupation: Actress
- Years active: 1916–1957

Dorothea Wolbert (April 12, 1874 – September 15, 1958) was an American film actress. She appeared in more than 140 films between 1916 and 1957. She appeared on the television series I Love Lucy (with her character named Dorothea Wolbert) in episode #137, "Ricky's European Booking" (1956).

She was born in Philadelphia, Pennsylvania and died in Hollywood, California.

== Selected filmography ==
- A Man of Sorrow (1916) - Sarah
- Luke Wins Ye Ladye Faire (1917, Short)
- Lonesome Luke's Lively Life (1917, Short)
- Lonesome Luke on Tin Can Alley (1917, Short)
- Lonesome Luke's Honeymoon (1917, Short)
- Lonesome Luke, Messenger (1917, Short)
- Lonesome Luke, Mechanic (1917, Short)
- Lonesome Luke's Wild Women (1917, Short)
- Over the Fence (1917, Short)
- Pinched (1917, Short)
- By the Sad Sea Waves (1917, Short) - Old Maid Bather in Shower (uncredited)
- Birds of a Feather (1917, Short)
- From Laramie to London (1917, Short)
- Love, Laughs and Lather (1917, Short)
- All Aboard (1917, Short)
- We Never Sleep (1917, Short)
- The Big Idea (1917, Short) - Old Maid with XX Skirt (uncredited)
- The Tip (1918, Short)
- The Lamb (1918, Short)
- Beat It (1918, Short)
- Look Pleasant, Please (1918, Short) - Old Maid Customer (uncredited)
- Here Come the Girls (1918, Short)
- Let's Go (1918, Short)
- Follow the Crowd (1918, Short)
- Pipe the Whiskers (1918, Short)
- Hey There! (1918, Short)
- Kicked Out (1918, Short)
- The Non-Stop Kid (1918, Short)
- Two-Gun Gussie (1918, Short) - An Admirer (uncredited)
- Fireman Save My Child (1918, Short)
- Sic 'Em, Towser (1918, Short)
- Somewhere in Turkey (1918, Short)
- No Place Like Jail (1918, Short)
- Just Rambling Along (1918, Short)
- The Dawn of Understanding (1918) - Mrs. Prescott
- Hear 'Em Rave (1918, Short)
- She Loves Me Not (1918, Short)
- Do You Love Your Wife? (1919, Short)
- The Enchanted Barn (1919) - Mrs. Hollister
- Hustling for Health (1919, Short)
- Ask Father (1919, Short) - Minor Role (uncredited)
- On the Fire (1919, Short)
- Hoot Mon! (1919, Short)
- I'm on My Way (1919, Short)
- The Dutiful Dub (1919, Short)
- Jazz and Jailbirds (1919, Short)
- Next Aisle Over (1919, Short) - Old Maid Passerby on Street (uncredited)
- Young Mr. Jazz (1919, Short)
- Ring Up the Curtain (1919, Short)
- Si, Senor (1919, Short)
- The Marathon (1919, Short) - The Rich Girl's Mother (uncredited)
- Pistols for Breakfast (1919, Short)
- Swat the Crook (1919, Short)
- Off the Trolley (1919, Short)
- The Solitary Sin (1919, Short)
- Cupid Forecloses (1919) - Mrs. Farleigh
- Smashing Barriers (1919, Short)
- At the Old Stage Door (1919, Short)
- La La Lucille (1920) - Fannie, the Janitor's Wife
- Pink Tights (1920) - Mrs. Bump
- A Beggar in Purple (1920) - Mrs. Grogan
- Action (1921) - Mirandy Meekin
- The Ruse of the Rattler (1921) - Mrs. Bludgeon
- The Little Minister (1922) - Nanny Webster
- The Ninety and Nine (1922) - Mrs. Markham
- The Flirt (1922) - The Cook
- The Abysmal Brute (1923) - Mrs. MacTavish
- The Gown Shop (1923, Short) - Audience member
- A Lady of Quality (1924) - Mistress Wimpole
- The Galloping Ace (1924) - Susie Williams
- The Guilty One (1924) - Anne (the maid)
- Duped (1925) - Sweet Marie
- West of Mojave (1925)
- A Woman of the World (1925) - Annie
- Pleasures of the Rich (1926) - Maggie the Maid
- Shivering Spooks (1926, Short) - Séance attendee
- The College Boob (1926) - Aunt Polly
- Exit Smiling (1926) - Anna (uncredited)
- Snowbound (1927) - Maid
- A Sailor's Sweetheart (1927) - Lena Svenson
- The Battle of the Century (1927, Short) - Warring pedestrian (uncredited)
- Love and Learn (1928) - Maid
- Anybody Here Seen Kelly? (1928) - Slavey
- Dangerous Paradise (1930) - Mrs. Schomberg
- The Medicine Man (1930) - Sister Wilson
- Borrowed Wives (1930) - Aunt Mary Foley
- The Front Page (1931) - Jenny
- Too Many Cooks (1931) - Aunt Emma Cook (uncredited)
- Friends and Lovers (1931) - Bertha the Barmaid (uncredited)
- The Beast of the City (1932) - Shoplifter (uncredited)
- The Expert (1932) - Annie
- Two Seconds (1932) - Lizzie - Cleaning Lady
- Hallelujah, I'm a Bum (1933) - Apple Mary
- Child of Manhattan (1933) - Dulcey's Aide Getting Chinchilla Coat (uncredited)
- The Mayor of Hell (1933) - Mrs. Burns (uncredited)
- The Women in His Life (1933) - Charwoman (uncredited)
- The Scarlet Letter (1934) - Mistress Allerton (uncredited)
- The Painted Veil (1934) - Stuttering Woman (scenes deleted)
- Vagabond Lady (1935) - Woman Given Opera Ticket (uncredited)
- Motive for Revenge (1935) - Annie - Maid
- Paris in Spring (1935) - Francine
- Reckless Roads (1935)
- Heir to Trouble (1935) - Tillie Tilks
- Fury (1936) - Hector's Wife (uncredited)
- Postal Inspector (1936) - Mrs. Coates (uncredited)
- The Emperor's Candlesticks (1937) - Bidder (uncredited)
- Three Comrades (1938) - Old Nurse (uncredited)
- The Arkansas Traveler (1938) - Old Lady (uncredited)
- Dramatic School (1938) - Flower Woman (uncredited)
- Within the Law (1939) - Minor Role (uncredited)
- They All Come Out (1939) - Psychiatrist's Nurse (uncredited)
- The Night of Nights (1939) - 2nd Pencil Woman (uncredited)
- Invisible Stripes (1939) - Flower Woman (uncredited)
- Abe Lincoln in Illinois (1940) - Woman in Store (uncredited)
- The Captain Is a Lady (1940) - Short Old Lady (uncredited)
- The Gay Sisters (1942) - Woman Pushed Away by Policeman (uncredited)
- Crack-Up (1946) - Old Lady (uncredited)
- Three Husbands (1950) - Cleaning Woman (uncredited)
- Little Egypt (1951) - Old Lady (uncredited)
- Hot Blood (1956) - Little Old Gypsy Woman (uncredited)
- Funny Face (1957) - Minor Role (uncredited)
