= At the Old Stage Door =

1919 film

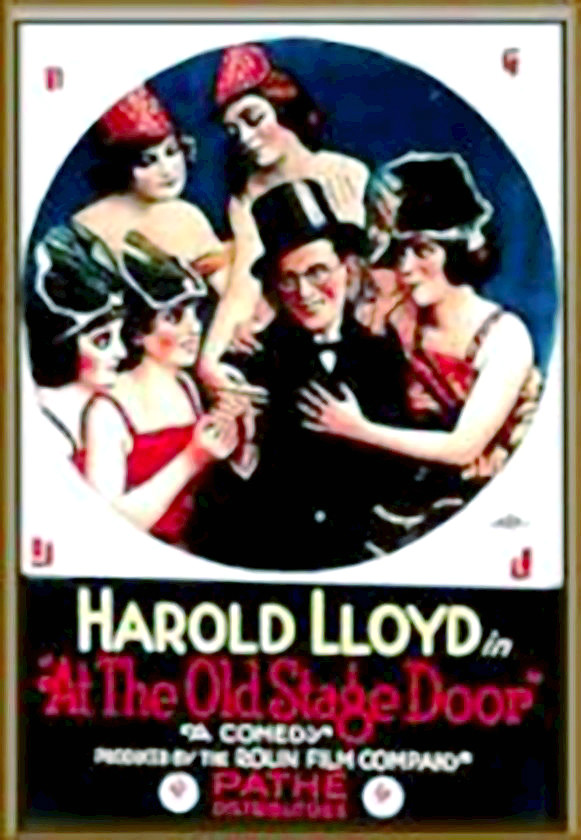
- Film poster
- Directed by: Hal Roach
- Produced by: Hal Roach
- Starring: Harold Lloyd
- Production company: Rolin Films
- Distributed by: Pathé Exchange
- Release date: July 20, 1919
- Running time: 1 reel
- Country: United States
- Languages: Silent; English intertitles

At the Old Stage Door is a 1919 American short comedy film featuring Harold Lloyd. A print of the film survives in the Museum of Modern Art.

== Cast ==
- Harold Lloyd
- Snub Pollard
- Bebe Daniels
- Sammy Brooks
- Lew Harvey
- Gus Leonard
- James Parrott
- Al St. John
- Dorothea Wolbert
- Noah Young

== See also ==
- List of American films of 1919
- Harold Lloyd filmography
