= Love, Laughs and Lather =

1917 film

- Written by: H. M. Walker
- Produced by: Hal Roach
- Starring: Harold Lloyd
- Release date: November 4, 1917
- Country: United States
- Languages: Silent; English intertitles

Love, Laughs and Lather is a 1917 American short comedy film featuring Harold Lloyd.

== Cast ==
- Harold Lloyd - Lonesome Luke
- Snub Pollard
- Bebe Daniels
- Gilbert Pratt
- Gus Leonard
- Fred C. Newmeyer
- Billy Fay
- Nina Speight
- Bud Jamison
- Charles Stevenson - (as Charles E. Stevenson)
- Dorothea Wolbert
- May Ballard - (as Mabel Ballard)
- Evelyn Page
- W.L. Adams
- Sammy Brooks
- Max Hamburger
- John Christian
- Harry Rindfleish
- David Voorhees
- Bud Zelofer
- Fred Jefferson
- Marie Mosquini
- Margaret Joslin - (as Margaret Joslin Todd)

== See also ==
- Harold Lloyd filmography
