= Nothing but Trouble (1918 film) =

1918 film

Nothing But Trouble
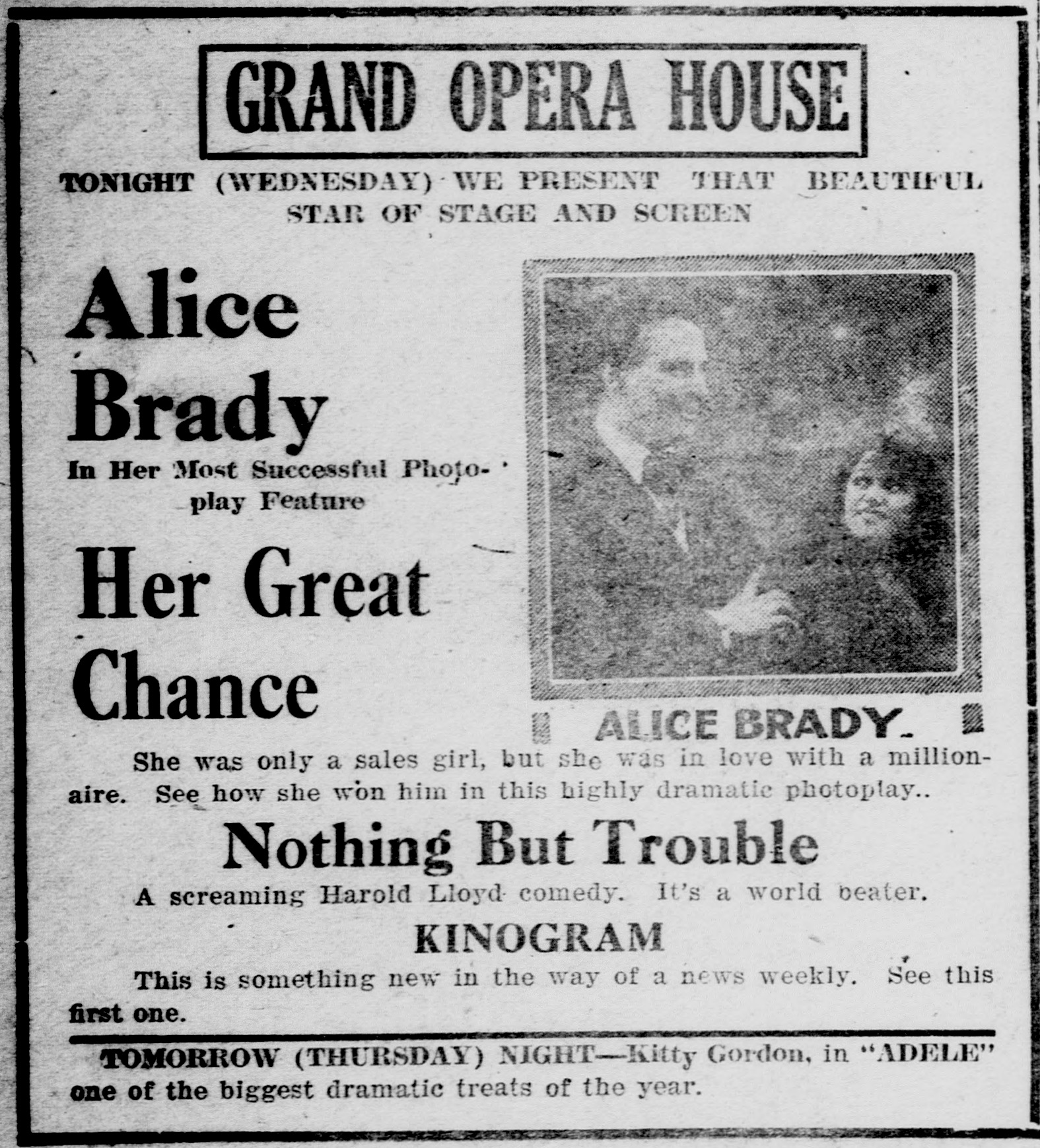
- Advertisement of the movie shown with the main attraction Her Great Chance
- Produced by: Hal Roach
- Starring: Harold Lloyd
- Distributed by: Pathé Exchange
- Release date: October 27, 1918
- Running time: 10 minutes
- Country: United States
- Languages: Silent; English intertitles

Nothing But Trouble is a 1918 American silent comedy short film featuring Harold Lloyd. A print of Nothing But Trouble exists.

== Cast ==
- Harold Lloyd
- Snub Pollard
- Bebe Daniels
- William Blaisdell
- Helen Gilmore
- Lew Harvey
- Wallace Howe
- Bud Jamison
- Belle Mitchell
- Noah Young
