= Never Again (1916 film) =

1916 film

- Directed by: Will Louis (aka Willard Louis)
- Produced by: Louis Burstein
- Starring: Oliver Hardy
- Release date: June 22, 1916
- Country: United States
- Languages: Silent film English intertitles

Never Again is a 1916 American silent comedy film featuring Oliver Hardy. It was filmed in St. Augustine, Florida, where he made a number of films, which contributed to its Spanish look.

== Plot ==
This synopsis appeared in The Moving Picture World of July 8, 1916:

Babe Hardy and Billy Ruge lead the fun-makers of this one-reel farce. As flump and Runt they take a trip to Spain and make the acquaintance of a real Spanish dancer, get in wrong with their sweethearts and are glad to return to America. Up to the usual Vim standard.

== Cast ==
- Oliver Hardy as Plump (as Babe Hardy)
- Billy Ruge as Runt
- Bert Tracy as Pop Dale
- Helen Gilmore as Mrs. Dale
- Florence McLaughlin as Their daughter (as Florence McLoughlin)
- Ray Godfrey as Their daughter

== See also ==
- List of American films of 1916
