= Lonesome Luke, Mechanic =

1917 film by Hal Roach

- Directed by: Hal Roach
- Produced by: Hal Roach
- Starring: Harold Lloyd
- Release date: August 19, 1917
- Country: United States
- Languages: Silent film English intertitles

Lonesome Luke, Mechanic is a 1917 American short comedy film featuring Harold Lloyd.

== Cast ==
- Harold Lloyd as Lonesome Luke
- Snub Pollard
- Bebe Daniels
- Arthur Mumas
- Sammy Brooks
- W.L. Adams
- Bud Jamison
- Sidney De Gray
- Lottie Case
- May Ballard
- Gus Leonard
- Harvey L. Kinney
- Elmer Ballard
- Estelle Harrison
- Dorothea Wolbert
- Marie Mosquini

== See also ==
- Harold Lloyd filmography
