= Lew Harvey =

American actor (1887–1953)

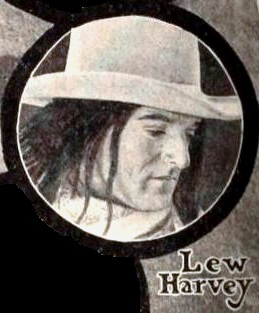
- Advertisement for The Half Breed, 1922
- Born: October 6, 1887; Wisconsin, US
- Died: December 19, 1953 (aged 66); Los Angeles, California, US
- Occupation: Actor
- Years active: 1918–1950

Lew Harvey (October 6, 1887 – December 19, 1953) was an American film actor. He appeared in more than 140 films between 1918 and 1950. He was born in Wisconsin, educated in Portland, Oregon, and died in Los Angeles, California.

== Selected filmography ==
- Hit Him Again (1918, Short)
- Look Pleasant, Please (1918, Short) - (uncredited)
- On the Jump (1918, Short)
- It's a Wild Life (1918, Short)
- The Non-Stop Kid (1918, Short)
- Two-Gun Gussie (1918, Short) - (uncredited)
- Somewhere in Turkey (1918, Short)
- Are Crooks Dishonest? (1918, Short)
- An Ozark Romance (1918, Short)
- Kicking the Germ Out of Germany (1918, Short)
- That's Him (1918, Short)
- Bride and Gloom (1918, Short)
- Why Pick on Me? (1918, Short)
- Nothing But Trouble (1918, Short)
- Hear 'Em Rave (1918, Short)
- Take a Chance (1918, Short) - (uncredited)
- She Loves Me Not (1918, Short)
- Wanted - $5,000 (1919)
- Ask Father (1919)
- On the Fire (1919)
- I'm on My Way (1919)
- Look Out Below (1919)
- The Dutiful Dub (1919)
- Next Aisle Over (1919)
- Young Mr. Jazz (1919)
- Crack Your Heels (1919)
- Si, Senor (1919)
- Before Breakfast (1919)
- The Marathon (1919)
- Pistols for Breakfast (1919)
- Swat the Crook (1919)
- Off the Trolley (1919)
- At the Old Stage Door (1919)
- Never Touched Me (1919)
- Heap Big Chief (1919)
- The Half Breed (1922)
- The Lighthouse by the Sea (1924)
- Ranger of the Big Pines (1925)
- Lady of the Night (1925)
- Eve's Lover (1925)
- The Fighting Edge (1926)
- Wolf's Clothing (1927)
- Frozen River (1929)
- The Greyhound Limited (1929)
- The Finger Points (1931) as Henchman in "Number One's" office (uncredited)
- Hold Everything (1930)
- The Oklahoma Kid (1939) as Ed Curley
- The Roaring Twenties (1939) as Ex-Con (uncredited)
- Honky Tonk (1941) as Blackie
- Return of the Bad Men (1948)
