= Hear 'Em Rave =

1918 short comedy film

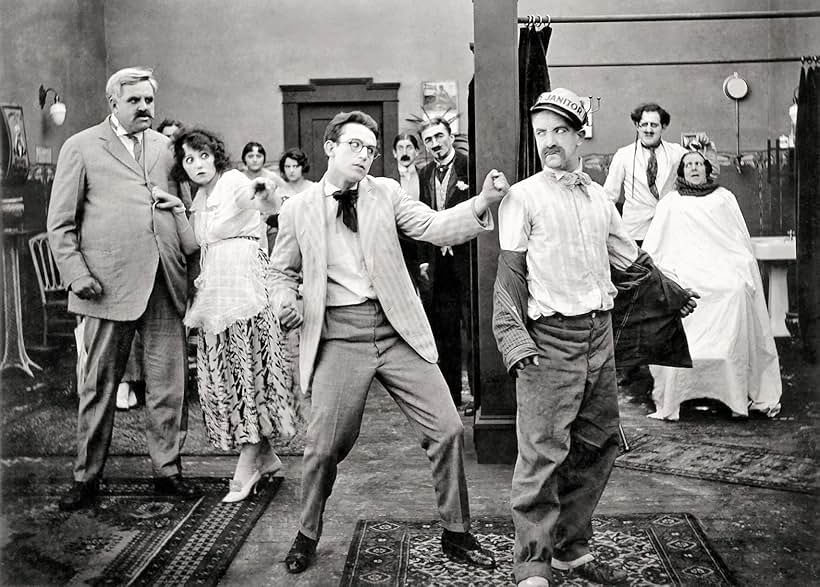
- Film still
- Directed by: Gilbert Pratt
- Produced by: Hal Roach
- Starring: Harold Lloyd
- Distributed by: Pathé Exchange
- Release date: December 1, 1918
- Running time: 11 minutes
- Country: United States
- Languages: Silent; English intertitles

Hear 'Em Rave is a 1918 American silent comedy short film featuring Harold Lloyd. The runtime of the short film is 11 minutes, and it was released on December 1, 1918 in the United States.

== Cast ==
- Harold Lloyd
- Snub Pollard
- Bebe Daniels
- William Blaisdell
- William Gillespie
- Lew Harvey
- Bud Jamison
- Oscar Larson
- James Parrott
- Dorothea Wolbert
- Noah Young

== See also ==
- Harold Lloyd filmography
