= William Blaisdell =

American actor

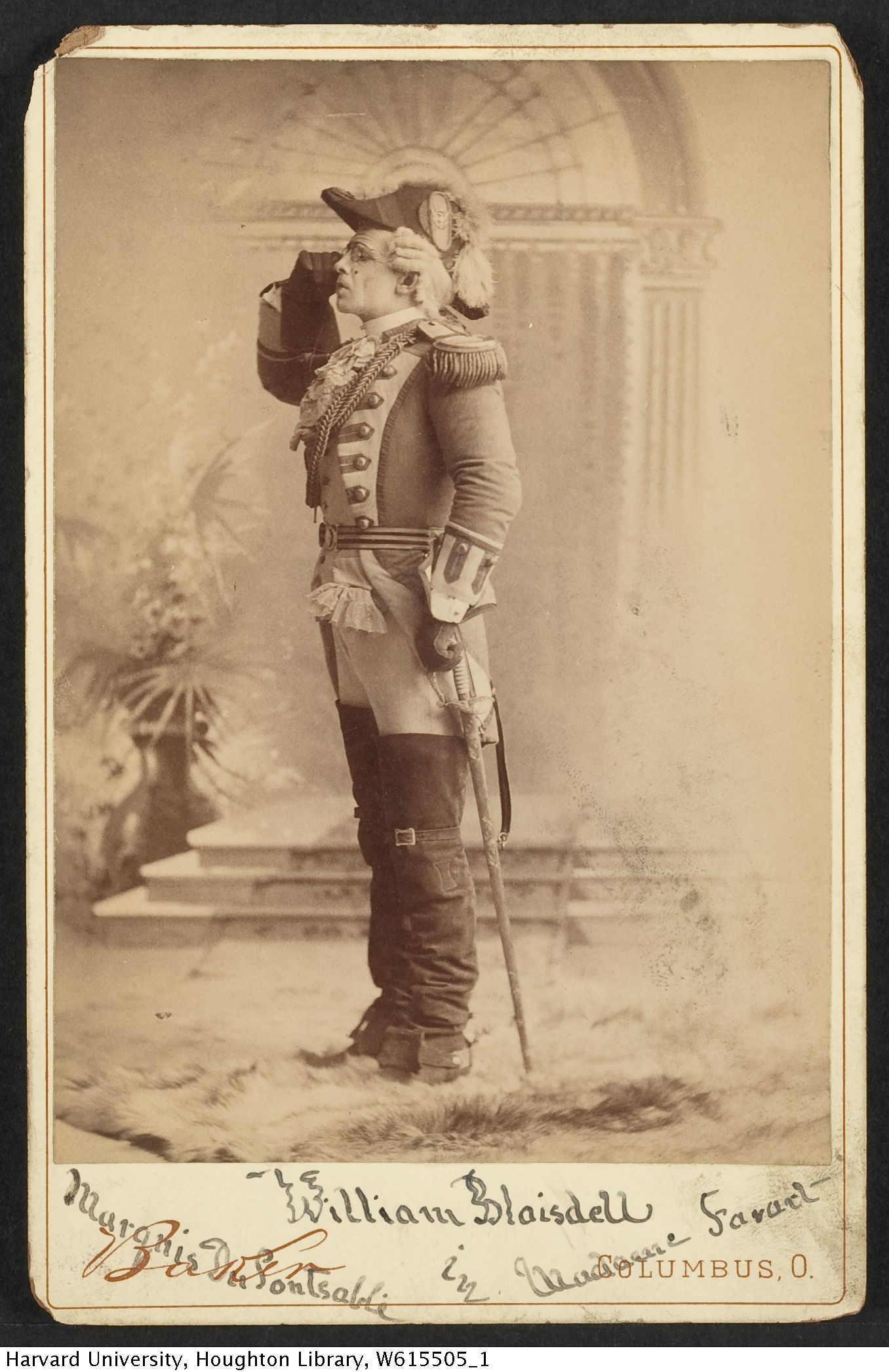
- Cabinet card of Blaisdell, pre-1914
- Born: April 1865; San Francisco, California, United States
- Died: January 1, 1931 (aged 65); Brooklyn, New York, United States
- Resting place: Kensico Cemetery

William Blaisdell (April 1865 – January 1, 1931) was an American actor, comedian, and singer. He was a member of the Peake family of musicians through his the mother, the harpist Julia Peake Blaisdell. He grew up performing in the Peak Family Bell Ringers as a child, and also performed on the stage in his father's theatre troupe as an actor and musician. As a teenager and young adult he performed as a singer and dancer in vaudeville before moving into work on the stage as a comic actor and singer in both light operas and plays. On screen he appeared in silent films released between the years 1917-1929.

== Early life and career ==
The son of William Blaisdell and harpist Julia Peake Blaisdell, William Blaisdell was born in April 1865 in San Francisco, California. He was trained by his mother as a musician and began performing as a child. His mother was part of the Peak family of musicians, and by 1870 young William was performing in the family music act, the Peak Family Bell Ringers, as a vocalist and instrumentalist. He also performed as an actor and musician in his father's theatre troupe. As a teenager he worked as singer in vaudeville under the name Willie Blaisdell.

By 1883 Blaisdell had formed a dance act with Josie Granger. He wrote the song "That's The Idea Exactly" which was published in Boston in 1886 under the name William Blaisdell, Jr. In 1886-1887 he toured as Prof J. Potiphar in the musical comedy Si Perkins; a production which was produced by his father. His father died of heart disease in Cincinnati in 1888. In 1888-1889 he toured as Felix Crackle in the musical farce Skipped By the Light of the Moon. For the 1889-1890 season he toured in Lizzie Evans's troupe as Charlie Childs in The Buckeye.

In 1890 Blaisdell was appointed a leading comic with the McCaull Comic Opera Company, replacing Jefferson De Angelis. With this organization he portrayed Spatzle in Karl Millöcker's The Seven Suabians (original German name Die sieben Schwaben) and Cassimir in Clover (an English language adaptation of Franz von Suppé's Jagd nach dem Glücke). For the 1891-1892 season he joined Pauline Hall's opera troupe for their touring productions of Jacques Offenbach's La belle Hélène (as King Ménélas of Sparta) and Offenbach's Madame Favart (as the Marquis de Pontsablé). For the fall of 1892 he was with Jennie Yeamans's company performing in 12 P.M.

In 1893 Blaisdell played in William Haworth's war drama A Flag of Truce before returning to Pauline Hall's troupe to perform as Sparacaui in Amorita in the summer of that year. In the Fall of 1893 he joined Fay Templeton's opera company to perform once again in Madame Favart. In 1894-1895 he toured in the farce A Railroad Ticket. In the Fall of 1895 he performed at Broadway's Fifth Avenue Theatre as Lord Fitzpoodle in Rupert Hughes's and Robert Coverly's comic opera The Bathing Girl before joining Lillian Russell's opera company with whom he toured as Don Pedro in La Périchole in the 1895-1896 season.

Blaisdell portrayed the prince in La mascotte by Edmond Audran in August 1896 at the Academy of Music in Atlantic City, New Jersey. After this he joined May Ten Broeck and John E. Henshaw's theatre troupe with whom he toured in the comic opera The Nabobs; or Dodge at the French Ball in 1896-1897. He returned to Broadway in 1897 as the French spy M. Auguste Pompier in The Girl from Paris at the Herald Square Theatre. This show was produced by Edward E. Rice, and Blaisdell toured in this work to the Chicago Grand Opera House among other theaters in 1897-1898. In the summer of 1898 he portrayed Sir Joseph in Gilbert and Sullivan's H.M.S. Pinafore at the Auditorium Theatre in Baltimore.

== Later life and career ==
In 1898-1899 Blaisdell toured in Alfred J. Kuttner and Sidney R. Ellis's musical The Evil Eye in the role of Peleg Philemon. The tour included a stop in New York City at the Grand Opera House in January 1899. He subsequently returned to Broadway as Otto Work in Star and Garter (1900, Victoria Theatre); Franz in Vienna Life (1901, Broadway Theatre); and Pettifer in The Toreador (1902, Knickerbocker Theatre). In 1905 he starred as Polycop in a production of Stanislaus Stange's The Wedding Day with Dorothy Morton as Lucille. In 1906 he toured in Raymond Hubbell's musical Fantana with Jefferson De Angelis's theater troupe. In 1907 he performed in vaudeville with Pat Rooney among other entertainers, and portrayed August Lump in a revival of The Strollers staged in Los Angeles.

In 1908 Blaisdell portrayed Kibosh in Victor Herbert's The Wizard of the Nile with the Aborn Opera Company, and toured as a member of the Manhattan Comic Opera Company. In 1909 he toured with Al Cameron's theatre company in The Last of the Regiment. After this his career had a lull after he was seriously injured in an assault at a railway station. The perpetuator had recently been released from an insane asylum. In 1911 he performed as a smuggler in Georges Bizet's Carmen at the Terrace Garden (also known as the Lexington Opera House) on 58th St in New York City with Bertha Shalek in the title role.

From 1912-1915 Blaisdell portrayed Monsieur Larose in a long running touring production of The Quaker Girl starring Natalie Alt (and later Bernice McCabe) in the title role. After leaving this tour he portrayed Gaspard in Robert Planquette's The Chimes of Normandy at the Standard Theatre in Manhattan where the production opened in May 1915. In 1916 he toured in Jerome Kern's musical Nobody Home.

In his later career, Blaisdell's work shifted away from the stage towards film. In 1917-1918 he worked as an actor numerous comedic short films made for Pathé Exchange with Harold Lloyd. These included All Aboard (1917), Bashful (1917), The Big Idea (1917), Over the Fence (1917), We Never Sleep (1917), Step Lively (1917), Are Crooks Dishonest? (1918), Fireman Save My Child (1918), Follow the Crowd (1918), Beat It (1918), On the Jump (1918), Pipe the Whiskers (1918), Take a Chance (1918), A Gasoline Wedding (1918), Hey There! (1918), The City Slicker (1918), Look Pleasant, Please (1918), An Ozark Romance (1918), Bees in His Bonnet (1918), Swing Your Partners (1918), Hear 'Em Rave (1918), Here Come the Girls (1918), The Non-Stop Kid (1918), Nothing but Trouble (1918), It's a Wild Life (1918), Kicked Out (1918), and Two-Gun Gussie (1918).

Blaisdell continued to work regularly in film into the late 1920s. Some of his many other films include Love's Young Scream (1919), On the Fire (1919), A Fat Chance (1924), Hot Sands (1924), Racing Luck (1924, as Cafe Proprietor), Don't Pinch (1925), Good Spirits (1925), Crazy like a Fox (1926), Dizzy Sights (1927), The Yankee Clipper (1927, as Ike), Sappy Service (1929), and Rough Dried (1929).

Blaisdell died in 1931. His widow, fellow actor Clara Lavine, died at age 75 on December 29, 1948.
