= Buzzin' Around =

1933 film

- Directed by: Alfred J. Goulding
- Written by: Jack Henley; Glen Lambert
- Produced by: Samuel Sax
- Starring: Fatty Arbuckle
- Cinematography: Edwin B. DuPar
- Production company: Vitaphone Corp. (Warner Bros.)
- Distributed by: Warner Bros.
- Release date: February 4, 1933
- Running time: 20 minutes
- Country: United States
- Language: English

Buzzin' Around is a 1933 American pre-Code comedy film starring Fatty Arbuckle, and directed by Alfred J. Goulding.

== Plot ==
Cornelius invents a liquid which makes objects unbreakable and resilient. Unfortunately he gets the wrong jar when going out to demonstrate his invention. One mishap follows another in this slapstick comedy.

== Cast ==
- Roscoe "Fatty" Arbuckle as Cornelius
- Al St. John as Al
- Dan Coleman in a bit part (uncredited)
- Fritz Hubert in a bit part (uncredited)
- Donald MacBride as Policeman (uncredited)
- Gertrude Mudge as Cornelius's Ma (uncredited)
- Al Ochs in a bit part (uncredited)
- Tom Smith in a bit part (uncredited)
- Alice May Tuck in a bit part (uncredited)
- Harry Ward in a bit part (uncredited)

== Production ==
Bees were animated. Outdoor scenes were filmed immediately around Vitagraph Studios, Midwood, Brooklyn.

== See also ==
- List of American films of 1933
- Fatty Arbuckle filmography
