= Do You Love Your Wife? =

1919 film

- Directed by: Hal Roach
- Produced by: Hal Roach
- Starring: Stan Laurel
- Cinematography: Robert Doran
- Edited by: Thomas J. Crizer
- Release date: January 5, 1919
- Country: United States
- Languages: Silent film English intertitles

Do You Love Your Wife? is a 1919 American film starring Stan Laurel.

== Cast ==
- Stan Laurel as The janitor
- Bunny Bixby
- Mary Burns
- Mildred Forbes
- William Gillespie
- Bud Jamison
- Gus Leonard
- Belle Mitchell
- Marie Mosquini
- Lois Neilson
- James Parrott
- William Petterson
- Charles Stevenson
- Dorothea Wolbert
- Noah Young

== See also ==
- List of American films of 1919
