= Lonesome Luke's Lively Life =

1917 film

- Directed by: Hal Roach
- Produced by: Hal Roach
- Starring: Harold Lloyd
- Release date: March 18, 1917
- Running time: 10 minutes
- Country: United States
- Languages: Silent; English intertitles

Lonesome Luke's Lively Life is a 1917 American short comedy film featuring Harold Lloyd. The film is extant.

== Cast ==
- Harold Lloyd - Lonesome Luke
- Bebe Daniels
- Snub Pollard
- Bud Jamison
- Sidney De Gray
- Charles Stevenson - (as Charles E. Stevenson)
- Sammy Brooks
- Ray Thompson
- Jack Perrin
- Elmer Ballard
- Larry Adams
- Virgil Owens
- Harvey L. Kinney
- Max Hamburger
- Thomas Cassidy
- Dorothea Wolbert
- Gus Leonard

== See also ==
- Harold Lloyd filmography
