= Pipe the Whiskers =

1918 film

- Directed by: Alfred J. Goulding
- Produced by: Hal Roach
- Starring: Harold Lloyd
- Distributed by: Pathé Exchange
- Release date: April 14, 1918
- Running time: 10 minutes
- Country: United States
- Languages: Silent; English intertitles

Pipe the Whiskers is a 1918 American silent comedy short film featuring Harold Lloyd. A print of Pipe the Whiskers exists in the Museum of Modern Art film archive in New York City.

== Cast ==
- Harold Lloyd as Janitor
- Snub Pollard
- Bebe Daniels
- William Blaisdell
- Sammy Brooks
- Lige Conley (as Lige Cromley)
- Billy Fay
- William Gillespie
- Fred C. Newmeyer
- James Parrott
- Dorothea Wolbert

== See also ==
- Harold Lloyd filmography
