= On the Fire =

1919 film

- Directed by: Hal Roach
- Produced by: Hal Roach
- Starring: Harold Lloyd
- Release date: February 23, 1919
- Country: United States
- Languages: Silent; English intertitles

On the Fire is a 1919 American short comedy film featuring Harold Lloyd. Some prints have the title of the film as The Chef. Prints of the film survive in several film archives, and it is available on DVD.

== Plot ==
Harold and Snub are chefs in an upscale restaurant. Harold, an idler, does many of his cooking tasks using pulleys, long-handled implements, and other gadgets so he does not have to leave his chair. When a customer orders a seafood dinner, and Harold tries to catch fish from the restaurant's fountain for it, he is reassigned from the kitchen to become a waiter. Trying to favor the female diners at the tables, Harold quickly runs afoul of the customers.

== Cast ==
- Harold Lloyd as The Chef
- Bebe Daniels
- Snub Pollard as The Assistant Chef
- Bud Jamison
- William Blaisdell
- Sammy Brooks
- Billy Fay
- Lew Harvey
- Wallace Howe
- Margaret Joslin
- Dee Lampton
- Marie Mosquini
- Fred C. Newmeyer
- Dorothea Wolbert
- Noah Young

== See also ==
- Harold Lloyd filmography
