= Bashful (film) =

1917 film

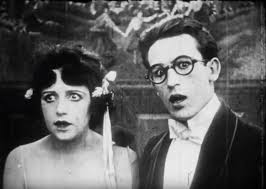
- Directed by: Alfred J. Goulding
- Written by: H. M. Walker
- Produced by: Hal Roach
- Starring: Harold Lloyd
- Cinematography: Walter Lundin
- Distributed by: Pathé Exchange
- Release date: December 23, 1917
- Running time: 10 minutes (1 reel)
- Country: United States
- Language: Silent (English intertitles)

Bashful is a 1917 American one-reel silent comedy short film featuring Harold Lloyd. A copy exists in the film archive of the Museum of Modern Art, New York City. The film is viewable free of charge on YouTube.

== Plot ==
Harold plays a shy but well-off bachelor who has been invited to a party hosted by The Girl (Bebe Daniels). While there, Harold receives a telegram informing him that he is about to inherit a fortune from a distant and recently deceased aunt—provided he is married and has a baby. The Girl agrees to act as his wife when his uncle arrives to inspect their household. Harold's valet (Snub) procures an entire room full of toddlers to play the role of the couple's child—including a black infant. His uncle sees the numerous children. Instead of being suspicious, since Harold claims he's only been married for two years, his uncle hands him the check and says he will certainly need the money.

== Cast ==
- Harold Lloyd as Harold (in a tuxedo who wears a glasses, top hat, white tie, shirt, and a tailcoat).
- Snub Pollard as Snub, Harold's butler (credited as Harry Pollard)
- Bebe Daniels as "The Girl"
- Bud Jamison
- William Blaisdell as Uncle Bill (Uncredited)
- James Morrison
- Sammy Brooks
- Billy Fay (credited as William Fay)
- William Gillespie
- Max Hamburger
- Annette Hatten (credited as Annette Hatton)
- Oscar Larson
- Maynard Laswell (credited as M.A. Laswell)
- Gus Leonard
- M.J. McCarthy
- Belle Mitchell
- Fred C. Newmeyer
- Evelyn Page (credited as Evelyn Paige)
- Hazel Powell
- Nina Speight
- Charles Stevenson
- William Strohbach (credited as William Strawback)

== Reception ==
Like many American films of the time, Bashful was subject to cuts by city and state film censorship boards. The Chicago Board of Censors required a cut of the last hula dance scene.

== See also ==
- List of American films of 1917
