= Lonesome Luke, Messenger =

1917 film by Hal Roach

- Directed by: Hal Roach
- Produced by: Hal Roach
- Starring: Harold Lloyd
- Release date: August 5, 1917
- Running time: 10 minutes
- Country: United States
- Languages: Silent; English intertitles

Lonesome Luke, Messenger is a 1917 American short comedy film starring Harold Lloyd. The film is extant.

== Plot ==
Lonesome Luke and Snub are employed as bicycle messengers. One of their assignments is to deliver several packages to an all-girls boarding school. Luke is quickly hustled out of the building after he sees the large amount of young ladies there. Luke and Snub create chaotic scenes trying to reenter the school as assistants to a burly wallpaper hanger.

== Cast ==
- Harold Lloyd – Lonesome Luke
- Bebe Daniels - Student
- Snub Pollard - Snub
- Gilbert Pratt
- Gus Leonard - Boxing Instructor
- Fred C. Newmeyer
- Billy Fay - Luke's Boss
- Nina Speight
- Bud Jamison - Paperhanger
- Charles Stevenson
- Dorothea Wolbert
- May Ballard – Student (as Mabel Ballard)
- Evelyn Page - Student
- W.L. Adams
- Sammy Brooks - Short Messenger

== See also ==
- Harold Lloyd filmography
