= Gus Leonard =

American actor

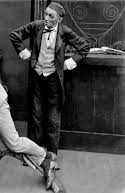
- Born: February 4, 1859; Marseille, France
- Died: March 27, 1939 (aged 80); Los Angeles, California
- Other name: Pop Leonard
- Occupation: Actor
- Years active: 1916–1937

Gus "Pop" Leonard (February 4, 1859 – March 27, 1939) was an American film actor.

== Biography ==
The French-born actor began his long career on the stage in San Francisco, California, while he was still a child in the 1860s. In later years, he specialised in a drunken waiter act in vaudeville.

Leonard started his film career in 1915 and mostly played supporting roles in slapstick comedies. He appeared in nearly 190 films between 1916 and 1937. He appeared in the Our Gang comedies: Mush and Milk, Teacher's Beau and The Lucky Corner. Leonard died of a cerebral hemorrhage in Los Angeles, California on March 27, 1939, aged 80.

== Partial filmography ==
- The Big Idea (1917)
- Step Lively (1917)
- Bashful (1917)
- Move On (1917)
- We Never Sleep (1917)
- All Aboard (1917)
- The Flirt (1917)
- Love, Laughs and Lather (1917)
- Rainbow Island (1917)
- Bliss (1917)
- By the Sad Sea Waves (1917)
- Pinched (1917)
- Lonesome Luke Loses Patients (1917)
- Over the Fence (1917)
- Lonesome Luke's Wild Women (1917)
- Lonesome Luke, Mechanic (1917)
- Lonesome Luke, Messenger (1917)
- Stop! Luke! Listen! (1917)
- Lonesome Luke, Plumber (1917)
- Lonesome Luke on Tin Can Alley (1917)
- Lonesome Luke's Lively Life (1917)
- Luke Wins Ye Ladye Faire (1917)
- Lonesome Luke, Lawyer (1917)
- Luke's Trolley Troubles (1917)
- No Place Like Jail (1918)
- That's Him (1918)
- An Ozark Romance (1918)
- Are Crooks Dishonest? (1918)
- Somewhere in Turkey (1918)
- Sic 'Em, Towser (1918)
- The City Slicker (1918)
- Fireman Save My Child (1918)
- Two-Gun Gussie (1918)
- The Non-Stop Kid (1918)
- Follow the Crowd (1918)
- On the Jump (1918)
- Let's Go (1918)
- Here Come the Girls (1918)
- Look Pleasant, Please (1918)
- Beat It (1918)
- Hit Him Again (1918)
- The Lamb (1918)
- The Tip (1918)
- From Hand to Mouth (1919)
- Bumping Into Broadway (1919)
- His Only Father (1919)
- Pay Your Dues (1919)
- Count the Votes (1919)
- Soft Money (1919)
- Don't Shove (1919)
- A Jazzed Honeymoon (1919)
- At the Old Stage Door (1919)
- Just Neighbors (1919)
- Spring Fever (1919)
- Off the Trolley (1919)
- Swat the Crook (1919)
- Pistols for Breakfast (1919)
- The Marathon (1919)
- A Sammy In Siberia (1919)
- Hoots Mon! (1919)
- Going! Going! Gone! (1919)
- Do You Love Your Wife? (1919)
- His Royal Slyness (1920)
- Commencement Day (1920)
- Two Minutes to Go (1921)
- The Barnstormer (1922)
- Watch Your Step (1922)
- The Deuce of Spades (1922)
- Second Hand Love (1923)
- Her Reputation (1923)
- Go West (1925)
- East Lynne (1925)
- The Nickel-Hopper (1926)
- Exit Smiling (1926)
- Good Time Charley (1927)
- Coney Island (1928)
- Speedy (1928)
- Mush and Milk (1933)
- Sherman Said It (1933)
- Teacher's Beau (1935)
- The Lucky Corner (1936)
- The Petrified Forest (1936)
- Maytime (1937)
