= Two-Gun Gussie =

1918 film

- Directed by: Alfred J. Goulding
- Written by: H. M. Walker
- Produced by: Hal Roach
- Starring: Harold Lloyd
- Cinematography: Walter Lundin
- Release date: May 19, 1918
- Running time: 8 minutes
- Country: United States
- Languages: Silent; English intertitles

Two-Gun Gussie is a 1918 American short comedy film featuring Harold Lloyd.

== Plot ==
Gussie (Harold Lloyd) is a mild-mannered easterner who finds employment as a piano player in a rowdy western saloon. Dagger-Tooth Dan, the toughest character in town, sees two letters the local sheriff has received. One includes a picture of him, from another western sheriff, with a warning that Dan is a violent menace. The other letter contains a photo of Gussie and a check from his father, asking the sheriff to gave the check to Gussie. Dan switches the photos in the envelopes so that he receives Gussie's check. Furthermore, the sheriff now believes that Gussie is a violent gunman. Within a short time, the entire town is scared of Gussie's reputation. Gussie himself starts to believe he is a tough guy. Inevitably, Gussie clashes with Dagger-Tooth Dan.

== Cast ==
- Harold Lloyd as Two-Gun Gussie (Harold)
- Snub Pollard as Snub (credited as Harry Pollard)
- Bebe Daniels as The Girl
- William Blaisdell as Dagger-Tooth Dan
- Charles Stevenson as Whooping-Cough Charlie, the Sheriff
- Sammy Brooks (uncredited)
- Billy Fay (uncredited)
- William Gillespie as Angry bar patron (uncredited)
- Helen Gilmore (uncredited)
- Lew Harvey (uncredited)
- Wallace Howe (uncredited)
- Bud Jamison (uncredited)
- Gus Leonard as Conservatory listener / bar patron (uncredited)
- Fred C. Newmeyer (uncredited)
- James Parrott (uncredited)
- Dorothea Wolbert as An Admirer (uncredited)

== Reception ==
Like many American films of the time, Two-Gun Gussie was subject to restrictions and cuts by city and state film censorship boards. For example, the Chicago Board of Censors cut the vulgar action of a man after being shot in the posterior.

== See also ==
- Harold Lloyd filmography
