= An Ozark Romance =

1918 film

- Directed by: Alfred J. Goulding
- Produced by: Hal Roach
- Starring: Harold Lloyd
- Release date: July 7, 1918
- Running time: 10 minutes
- Country: United States
- Languages: Silent; English intertitles

An Ozark Romance is a 1918 American silent comedy short film featuring Harold Lloyd. Prints of the film survive at the film archive of the Museum of Modern Art.

== Cast ==
- Harold Lloyd
- Snub Pollard
- Bebe Daniels
- William Blaisdell
- Sammy Brooks
- William Gillespie
- Helen Gilmore
- Lew Harvey
- Gus Leonard
- James Parrott
- Charles Stevenson (as Charles E. Stevenson)

== See also ==
- Harold Lloyd filmography
