= The City Slicker =

1918 film

- Directed by: Gilbert Pratt
- Produced by: Hal Roach
- Starring: Harold Lloyd
- Release date: June 2, 1918
- Running time: 12 minutes
- Country: United States
- Languages: Silent; English intertitles

The City Slicker is a 1918 American short comedy film featuring Harold Lloyd. Prints of the film survive in the film archive of the Library of Congress.

== Plot ==
Harold arrives in the backward town of Punkville by train to answer a classified ad offering employment for an eager young man who can modernize an antiquated hotel. Within a short time Harold has modernized the inn, including having rooms where the furniture. beds, telephones and bathtubs emerge from the walls. Bebe arrives at the hotel accompanied by her somewhat overbearing mother. Harold is attracted to her and helps her thwart an unwanted and much older suitor.

== Cast ==
- Harold Lloyd as Harold
- Snub Pollard as Snub (as Harry Pollard)
- Bebe Daniels as The Girl
- Helen Gilmore as Girl's Mother
- William Blaisdell as Bebe's rejected suitor
- Gus Alexander
- Sammy Brooks
- Lige Conley (as Lige Cromley)
- Billy Fay
- William Gillespie
- Wallace Howe
- Dee Lampton as Driver
- Gus Leonard as Old man playing checkers
- Charles Stevenson (as Charles E. Stevenson)

== See also ==
- List of American films of 1918
- Harold Lloyd filmography
