= No Place Like Jail =

1918 film

- Directed by: Frank Terry
- Produced by: Hal Roach
- Starring: Stan Laurel
- Cinematography: Robert Doran
- Edited by: Thomas J. Crizer
- Release date: October 7, 1918
- Country: United States
- Languages: Silent film English intertitles

No Place Like Jail is a 1918 American one-reel silent comedy film directed by Frank Terry that features Stan Laurel.

== Cast ==
- Dan Alberts
- Margaret Hansen
- Estelle Harrison
- Wallace Howe
- Bud Jamison
- Stan Laurel as Convict
- Gus Leonard
- Chris Lynton
- Belle Mitchell
- Herb Morris
- Marie Mosquini
- James Parrott
- William Petterson
- Hazel Powell
- Alice Renze
- Jane Sherman
- Dorothy Terry
- Dorothea Wolbert
- Noah Young

== See also ==
- List of American films of 1918
