= Two Scrambled =

1918 film

- Directed by: Gilbert Pratt
- Produced by: Hal Roach
- Starring: Harold Lloyd
- Production company: Rolin Films
- Distributed by: Pathé Exchange
- Release date: September 1, 1918
- Running time: 1 reel
- Country: United States
- Language: Silent (English intertitles)

Two Scrambled is a 1918 American short comedy film featuring Harold Lloyd. The film is presumed to be lost. Like many American films of the time, Two Scrambled was subject to restrictions and cuts by city and state film censorship boards. For example, the Chicago Board of Censors required a cut of the intertitle "The honest tailor will return the wallet, but it is killing him by inches."

== Cast ==
- Harold Lloyd
- Snub Pollard
- Bebe Daniels
- William Gillespie
- Helen Gilmore
- Bud Jamison
- James Parrott
- Malcolm St. Clair
- Charles Stevenson
- Noah Young

== See also ==
- Harold Lloyd filmography
