= The Big Idea (1917 film) =

1917 film

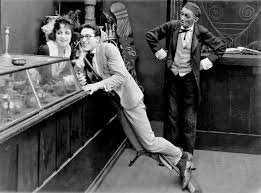
- Directed by: Gilbert Pratt
- Written by: Hal Mohr
- Produced by: Hal Roach
- Starring: Harold Lloyd
- Cinematography: Hal Mohr
- Production company: Rolin Films
- Distributed by: Pathé Exchange
- Release date: December 30, 1917
- Running time: 1 reel
- Country: United States
- Language: Silent (English intertitles)

The Big Idea is a 1917 American short comedy film starring Harold Lloyd. The film has been preserved and is available online.

== Plot ==
Harold, Snub and Bebe are employees at a pawn shop that is having trouble attracting customers. The boss informs Bebe that business is so slow that he will have to let her go. Both Harold and Snub are smitten by Bebe. Harold comes up with a clever way to save Bebe's job. He circulates a fake telegram stating there is an item in the pawn shop marked with a double X that contains $10,000. Harold proceeds to mark numerous items in the shop with the double X and makes sure that several people on the street accidentally see the bogus telegram. Very soon the hopeful customers come into the antique store and buy almost everything on the floor. The happy proprietor rehires Bebe. She and Snub see the phony telegram too. Snub sees the only unsold item left in the shop—a large vase—has a double X on it and buys it. Snub eagerly buys the vase before Harold can tell him about the ruse. Snub angrily smashes the vase—and finds a large sack containing $10,000. Snub and Bebe happily leave the antique shop arm in arm with the huge amount of money.

== Cast ==
- Harold Lloyd
- Snub Pollard
- Bebe Daniels
- William Blaisdell
- Sammy Brooks
- Lige Conley (credited as Lige Cromley)
- Billy Fay
- William Gillespie
- Gus Leonard
- Norman Napier
- Fred C. Newmeyer
- Dorothea Wolbert

== Reception ==
Like many American films of the time, The Big Idea was subject to cuts by city and state film censorship boards. For example, the Chicago Board of Censors required a cut of a closeup of hands holding U.S. currency.

== See also ==
- List of American films of 1917
