= Why Pick on Me? (1918 film) =

1918 film

- Produced by: Hal Roach
- Starring: Harold Lloyd
- Distributed by: Pathé Exchange
- Release date: October 13, 1918
- Running time: 10 minutes
- Country: United States
- Languages: Silent; English intertitles

Why Pick on Me? is a 1918 American silent comedy short film starring Harold Lloyd.

== Cast ==
- Harold Lloyd
- Snub Pollard
- Bebe Daniels
- William Blaisdell
- Sammy Brooks
- Harry Burns
- William Gillespie
- Helen Gilmore
- Lew Harvey
- Bud Jamison
- James Parrott
