= Fireman Save My Child (1918 film) =

1918 film

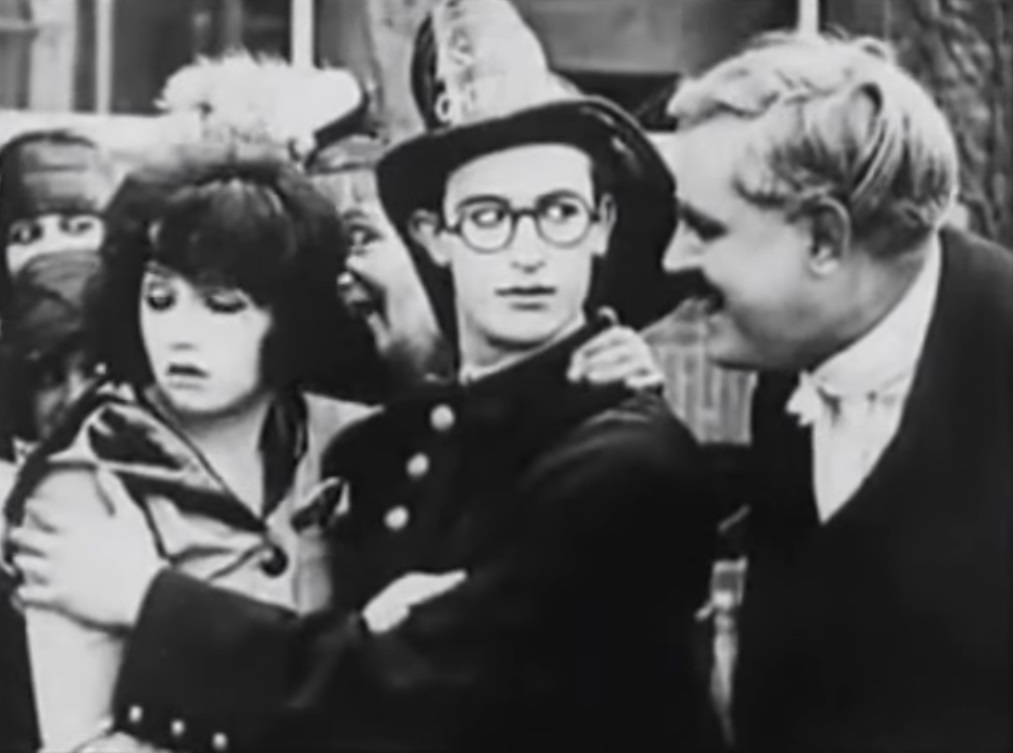
- Directed by: Alfred J. Goulding
- Written by: H. M. Walker
- Produced by: Hal Roach
- Starring: Harold Lloyd
- Cinematography: Walter Lundin
- Distributed by: Pathe Exchange
- Release date: May 26, 1918
- Running time: 8 minutes
- Country: United States
- Languages: Silent; English intertitles

Fireman Save My Child is a 1918 American short comedy film starring Harold Lloyd.

== Plot ==
Bebe's parents promise her hand in marriage to the local fire chief, Snub. Bebe, however, is only interested in marrying Harold—who is not a member of the fire department. Harold crashes the Firemen's Ball where he gets into conflicts with Bebe's parents and Snub. Bebe leaves the ball angrily, declaring that her passion is for Harold. Shortly thereafter, the station receives an alarm about a fire. The second lieutenant abruptly quits the fire department. Harold agrees to take his place and drive the fire truck to the blaze. After stopping to extinguish a burning cigar in a drunk's pocket, the firemen arrive at the site of the real fire. It is Bebe's house that is ablaze. Harold announces that he will enter the burning house to rescue Bebe from an upper floor if he can have her hand in marriage. Her parents agree. After an initial mistake in which he rescues a household servant instead of Bebe, Harold succeeds. The film ends with Harold and Bebe shyly exchanging kisses.

== Cast ==
- Harold Lloyd
- Snub Pollard
- Bebe Daniels
- William Blaisdell
- Sammy Brooks
- Harry Burns
- Lige Conley (as Lige Cromley)
- Billy Fay (as B. Fay)
- Gus Leonard
- Alma Maxim
- James Parrott
- Dorothea Wolbert

== See also ==
- List of American films of 1918
