= The Non-Stop Kid =

1918 film

- Directed by: Gilbert Pratt
- Written by: H.M. Walker
- Produced by: Hal Roach
- Starring: Harold Lloyd
- Cinematography: Walter Lundin
- Release date: May 12, 1918
- Running time: 12 minutes
- Country: United States
- Languages: Silent; English intertitles

The Non-Stop Kid is a 1918 American short comedy film featuring Harold Lloyd.

== Plot ==
Bebe plays a pretty young thing with several suitors, including Harold, competing to win her affections.

== Cast ==
- Harold Lloyd as Harold
- Snub Pollard as Snub, the butler (as Harry Pollard)
- Bebe Daniels as Miss Wiggle
- William Blaisdell as Bebe's father
- Sammy Brooks as Short bearded man
- Billy Fay as Prof. Fay
- William Gillespie (unconfirmed)
- Lew Harvey (unconfirmed)
- Bud Jamison (unconfirmed)
- Margaret Joslin (unconfirmed)
- Gus Leonard as Old man at party
- J. Darcie 'Foxy' Lloyd (as James Darsie Lloyd)
- Charles Stevenson (unconfirmed)
- Dorothea Wolbert (unconfirmed)
- Noah Young (unconfirmed)

== See also ==
- Harold Lloyd filmography
