= Take a Chance (1918 film) =

1918 film

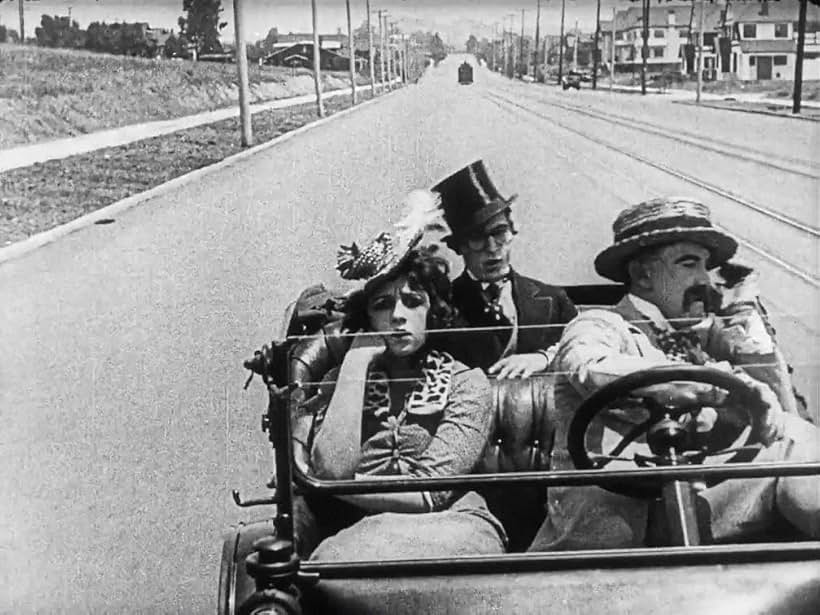
- Film still
- Directed by: Alfred J. Goulding
- Produced by: Hal Roach
- Starring: Harold Lloyd
- Release date: December 15, 1918
- Running time: 10 minutes (1-reel)
- Country: United States
- Languages: Silent; English intertitles

Take a Chance is a 1918 American one-reel short comedy film featuring Harold Lloyd. The film is extant to this day.

== Plot ==
Harold becomes smitten with a hired girl (Bebe) who is washing a staircase. When Bebe's beau (Snub) arrives to drive her to a picnic, Harold stealthily sneaks into the back seat of Snub's car. Without their being aware of his presence, Harold causes them to get into a fight. When the car arrives at the picnic grounds, Harold and Bebe enter the park together and enjoy a frantic few moments on a seesaw. Two prison escapees enter the park. One clubs Harold over the head and dresses him in his prison garb to confuse the pursuing police force. Harold uses his wits and athletic ability to elude capture by many officers.

== Cast ==
- Harold Lloyd as The Sport
- Snub Pollard as Simplex Joe (as Harry Pollard)
- Bebe Daniels as The Hired Girl
- William Blaisdell (uncredited)
- Sammy Brooks (uncredited)
- Harry Burns (uncredited)
- Billy Fay (uncredited)
- James A. Fitzgerald as Tall Policeman (uncredited)
- William Gillespie as Policeman (uncredited)
- Lew Harvey (uncredited)
- Wallace Howe (uncredited)
- Bud Jamison (uncredited)
- Dee Lampton (uncredited)
- Belle Mitchell (uncredited)
