= Chicago Board of Censors =

Defunct regulatory agency in Chicago

Agency overview
- Formed: 1907; 119 years ago
- Dissolved: 1984; 42 years ago
- Type: Censorship board
- Jurisdiction: Chicago, Illinois
- Headquarters: Chicago, Illinois

A list of cuts made to films by the Chicago Board of Censors. Published in the Exhibitors Herald in 1918

The Chicago Board of Censors was a film censorship committee based in Chicago that was founded in 1907 as the Police Censor Board, and operated until 1984. It was the first film censorship board in the United States. The board had great influence over the editing and distribution of many films.

The city's censorship code was directly challenged and upheld by two U.S. Supreme Court cases called Times Film Corporation v. City of Chicago, one in 1957 and one in 1961. Soon thereafter, other Supreme Court decisions in the 1960s (especially Freedman v. Maryland in 1965) reversed this holding and rendered municipal censorship laws largely ineffectual.

== See also ==
- Film censorship in the United States
- Hays Code
