= Lige Conley =

American actor

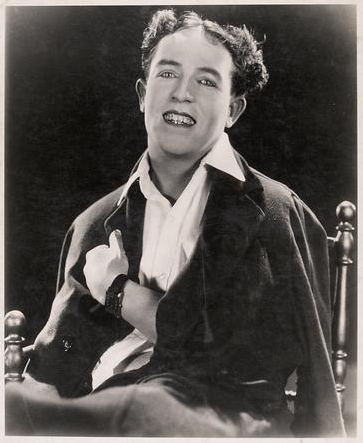
- Born: Elijah Crommie; December 5, 1897; St. Louis, Missouri, U.S.
- Died: December 11, 1937 (aged 40); Hollywood, California, U.S.
- Years active: 1915-1935

Lige Conley (born Elijah Crommie; December 5, 1897 – December 11, 1937) was an American actor of the silent era. He appeared in 140 films between 1915 and 1938.

== Biography ==
As Lige Crommie, the curly-haired young comedian joined the stock company of the Mack Sennett studio in 1915. In 1917 he moved to the up-and-coming Hal Roach studio, then producing one-reel comedies with Harold Lloyd, Bebe Daniels, and Snub Pollard. The Roach comedies credited the actor as "Lige Cromley," but since Lloyd and company dominated their pictures, which were limited to single reels, there was little chance for Lige to distinguish himself. He returned to Sennett as a stock player, again as Lige Crommie. When Sennett director Fred Fishback left Sennett for his own unit at Universal Pictures. Lige soon joined him there.

In 1921 the comic finally achieved stardom at Educational Pictures, where he appeared in a long string of brisk, elaborately staged two-reel comedies produced by Jack White. Some of these were directed by Fishback, under the pseudonym of Fred Hibbard. Educational took out trade ads in the mid-1920s, hailing Conley as the next Charlie Chaplin. Conley, with his curly hair and coy grin, did indeed bear a resemblance to the out-of-character Chaplin.

Conley's stock-in-trade was the comedy of embarrassment, as his meek screen character earnestly failed at any occupation he tried. Conley's two most famous comedies are both 1924 releases. Fast and Furious, directed by Norman Taurog, is a fast-moving comedy set in a general store, with Lige doing everything from demonstrating pancake batter to selling shoes. The last half of the film is a spectacular car-motorcycle-and-train chase, some of which was excerpted in the Kevin Brownlow-David Gill silent-film documentary Hollywood (1980). Air Pockets, directed by Fred Hibbard, casts Lige as an inventor about to demonstrate his "folding flivver" automobile to a board of executives. The film shows his accident-prone problems getting to the appointment, then the demonstration (which ends in disaster), and finally his fleeing from the appointment in a runaway airplane.

Educational dropped the Conley comedies in 1926; the last film in the series was Kiss Papa. Conley joined the Fox studio's comedy company, but Fox soon stopped making its own comedy shorts (in favor of releasing Educational's shorts) and Conley was again unemployed. He returned to Educational and Sennett, now playing smaller roles in support of other stars.

Conley did make the transition to the new talking pictures, but only in incidental and bit roles for Educational and Sennett. He continued to play uncredited bits into the 1930s. He died in 1937, struck and killed by the driver of an automobile soon after playing a small role in the Fred Allen comedy Sally, Irene and Mary.

== Selected filmography ==
Harold Lloyd comedies featuring Lige Conley:

- Step Lively (1917)
- The Big Idea (1917)
- Hit Him Again (1918)
- A Gasoline Wedding (1918)
- Look Pleasant, Please (1918)

Starring Lige Conley:

- Spooks (1922)
- Cold Chills (1923)
- This Way Out (1923)
- Fast and Furious (1924)
- Air Pockets (1924)
- Pleasure Bound (1925)
- Cheap Skates (1925)
- Matrimony Blues (1926)
- Kiss Papa (1926)
- The Battling Kangaroo (1926)
