= James Parrott =

American actor and director (1897–1939)

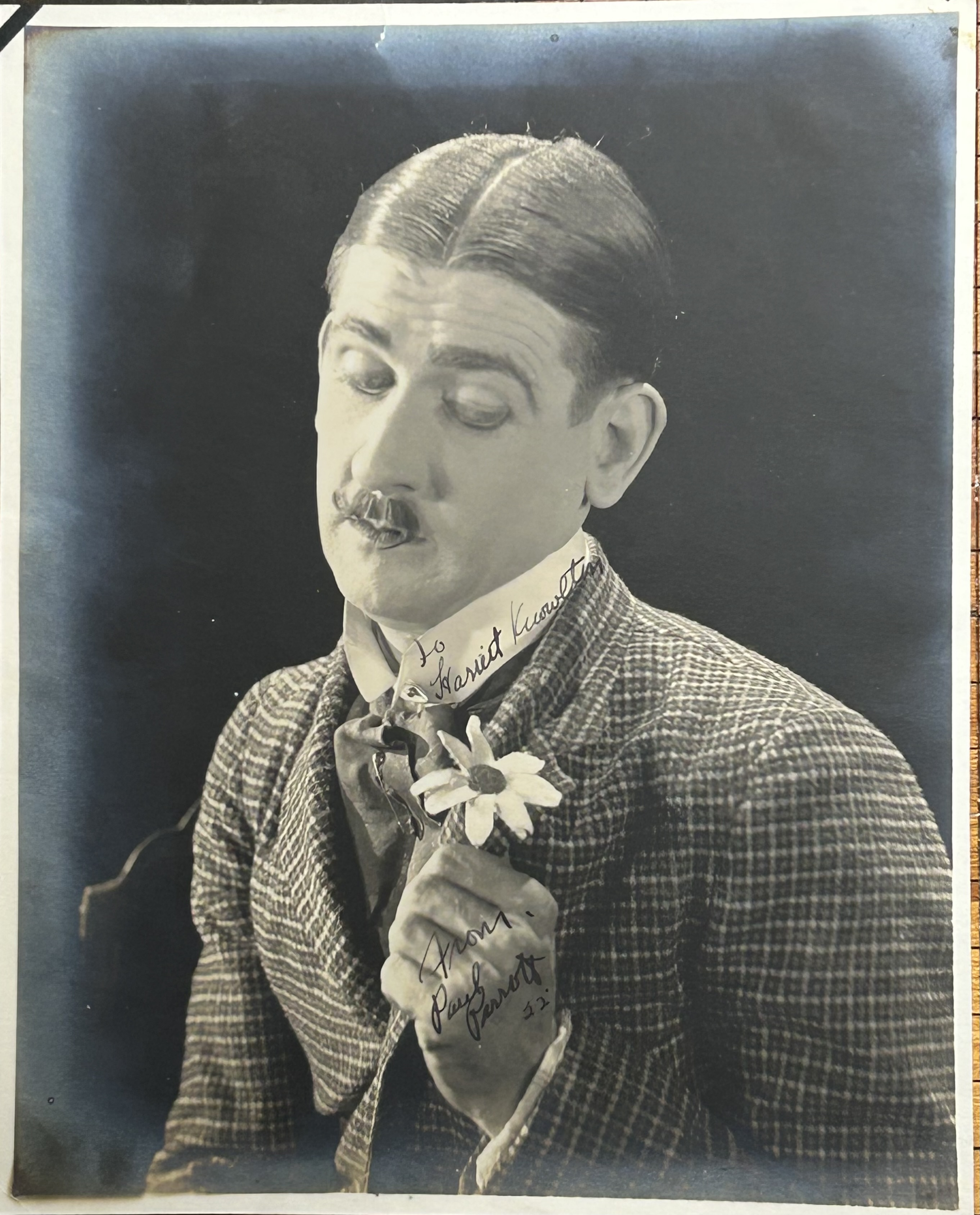
- As Paul Parrott (1922)
- Born: August 2, 1897; Baltimore, Maryland
- Died: May 10, 1939 (aged 41); Los Angeles, California
- Other name: Paul Parrott
- Occupations: Film director, actor
- Years active: 1913–1939

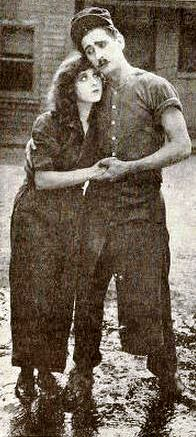
Jobyna Ralston with Parrott in The White Blacksmith, (1922)

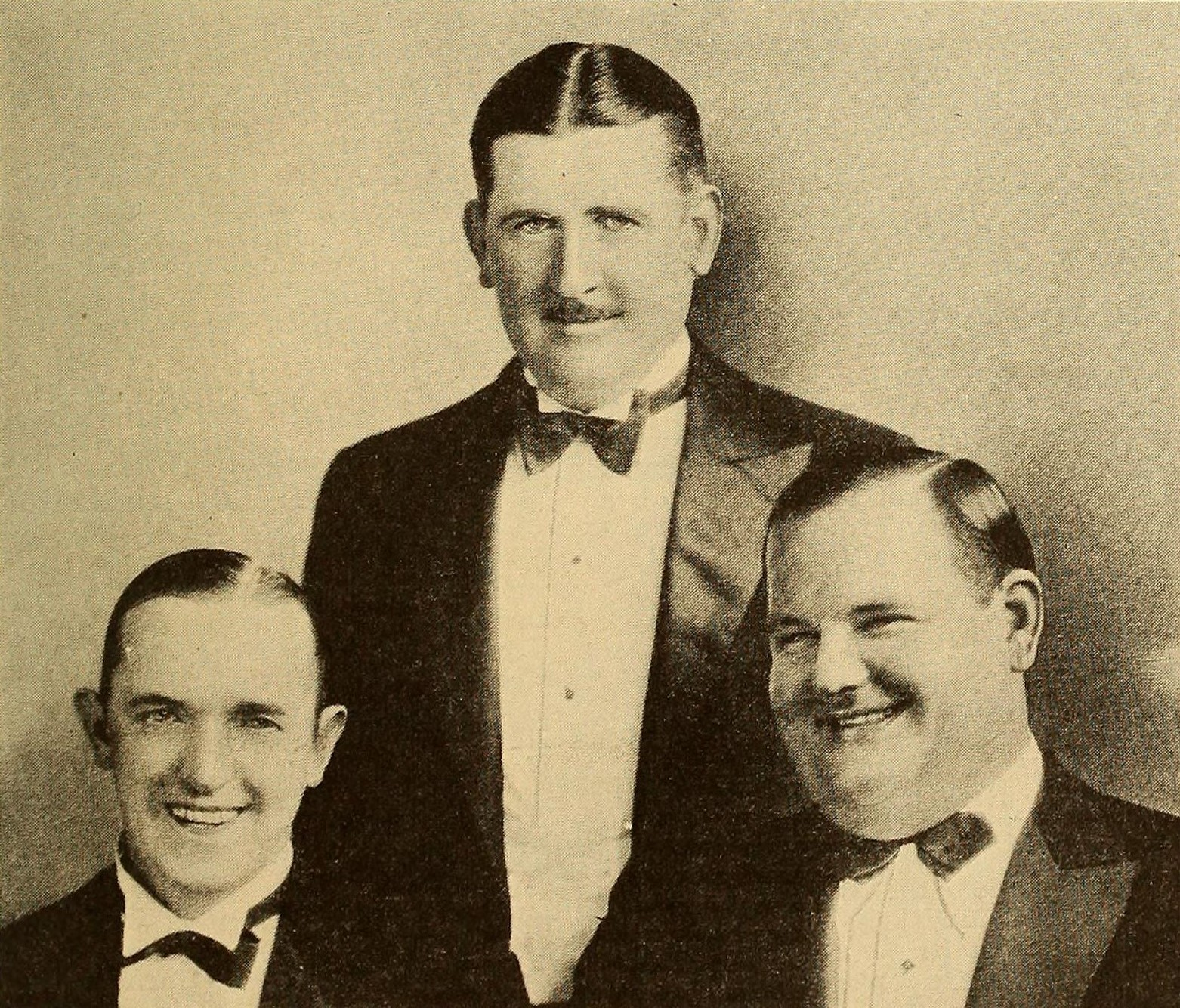
Clockwise from top: Parrott, Oliver Hardy, and Stan Laurel, c. 1930

James Parrott (August 2, 1897 – May 10, 1939) was an American actor and film director; and the younger brother of film comedian Charley Chase.

== Biography ==
=== Early years ===
James Gibbons Parrott was born in Baltimore, Maryland, to Charles and Blanche Thompson Parrott. In 1903, his father died from a heart attack, leaving the family in bad financial shape, which forced them to move in with a relative. Charley Jr. quit school, so he could go to work, in order to support his mother and brother. Eventually the call of the stage beckoned him, and Charley Jr. left home at age 16 to travel the vaudeville circuit as a singer and comedic performer.

James was forced to leave school at a young age, in order to earn money to support the family. His first job was as a bellboy at the age of 10.Two years later, he was a driver of a horse-drawn carriage. He later became a prop man when his brother Charley was a director at Fox.

Later, Charley's connections in the film industry helped his younger brother to become established in movies, and he would appear during the 1920s in a series of relatively successful comedies for producer Hal Roach. He was billed first as "Paul Parrott", then "Jimmie Parrott". Approximately 75 comedies were produced from 1921 to 1923, with titles continuing to be released through Pathé until 1926. Frequent co-stars included Marie Mosquini, Jobyna Ralston, Eddie Baker, and Sunshine Sammy.

Parrott is probably best known as a comedy director. As "James Parrott", he specialized in the two-reel misadventures of Laurel and Hardy, including Helpmates (1931) and the Oscar-winning classic The Music Box (1932).

=== Later years ===
During the 1930s Parrott had acquired serious drinking and drug problems (his diet medications were actually addictive amphetamines) and although still able to direct quality shorts, he had developed a reputation as unreliable. By the mid-1930s his work was spotty: Stan Laurel used him sporadically to contribute gags to the Laurel and Hardy features, and he would direct an Our Gang short in 1934, plus several acceptable entries in Thelma Todd–Patsy Kelly series.

=== Death ===
By 1937, Parrott was accepting any jobs that came his way. He could no longer be counted on to direct or write, and relied on his brother to support him financially. There was a brief marriage to Ruby Ellen McCoy in 1937, but as his various addictions worsened, so did his state of mind.

James Parrott died in 1939. His brother Charley was guilt-ridden; he had refused to help James financially until he overcame his substance-abuse problems. Parrott's death at 41 was attributed to a heart attack, but former Hal Roach associates maintained he committed suicide. Chase drank heavily to cope with his loss, and died the following year. Both brothers are interred at Glendale's Forest Lawn Memorial Park.

=== Spouses ===
- Clara Miller m. 1921-?
- Ruby Ellen McCoy m. 1937-1939

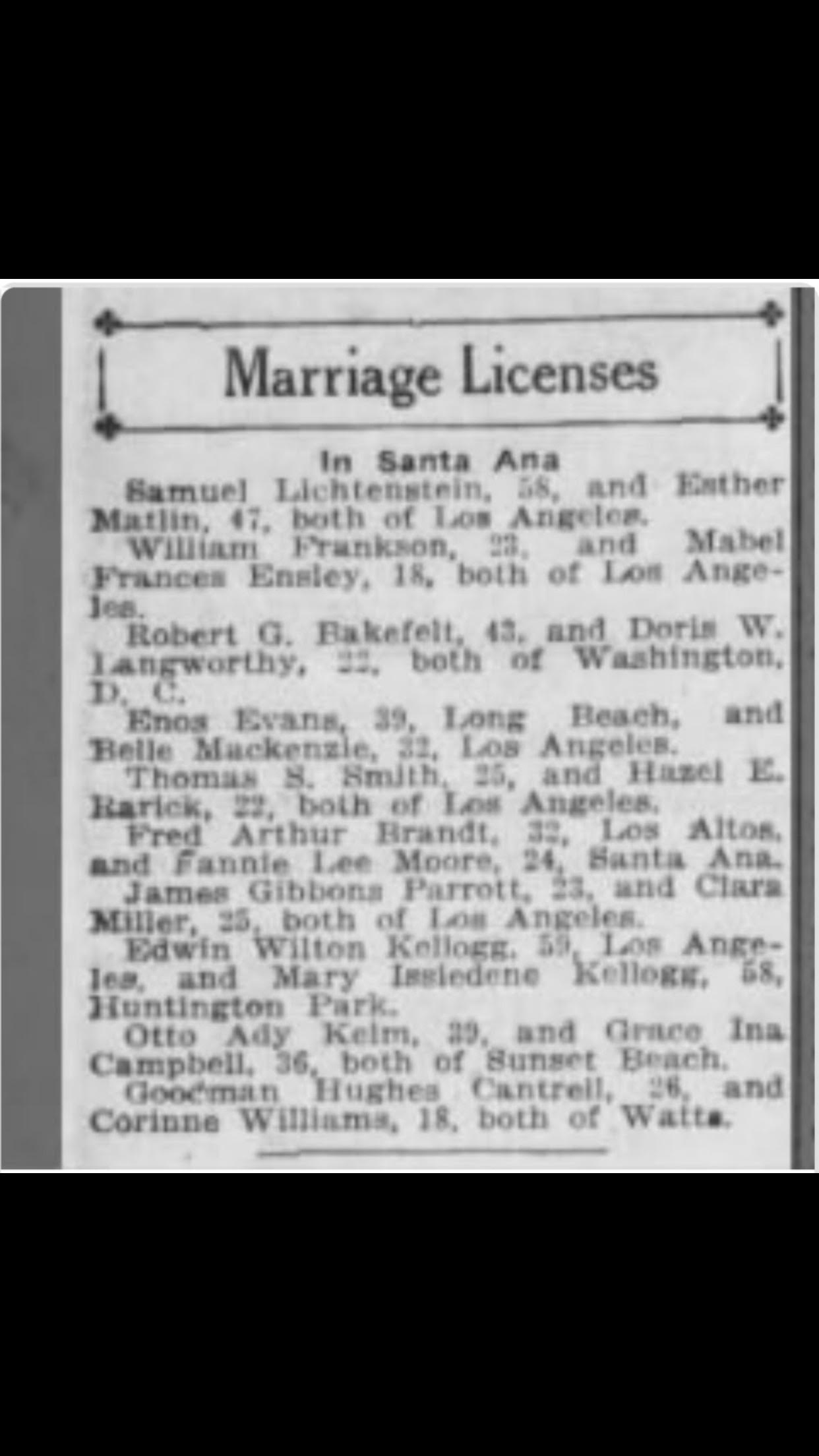
Marriage License for James Parrott and his first wife Clara Miller.

The Sons of the Desert's Twice Two tent (St Neots, UK), researching James Gibbons Parrott, discovered that he married Clara Miller in 1921. However, there is scant information about her: no date of birth, only that she was a housewife, with no available photograph. The tent traced them living together in Beverly Hills, but the trail runs cold by 1930. With lack of evidence, one can only speculate what happened next to the couple; thus far there is no evidence of divorce papers.

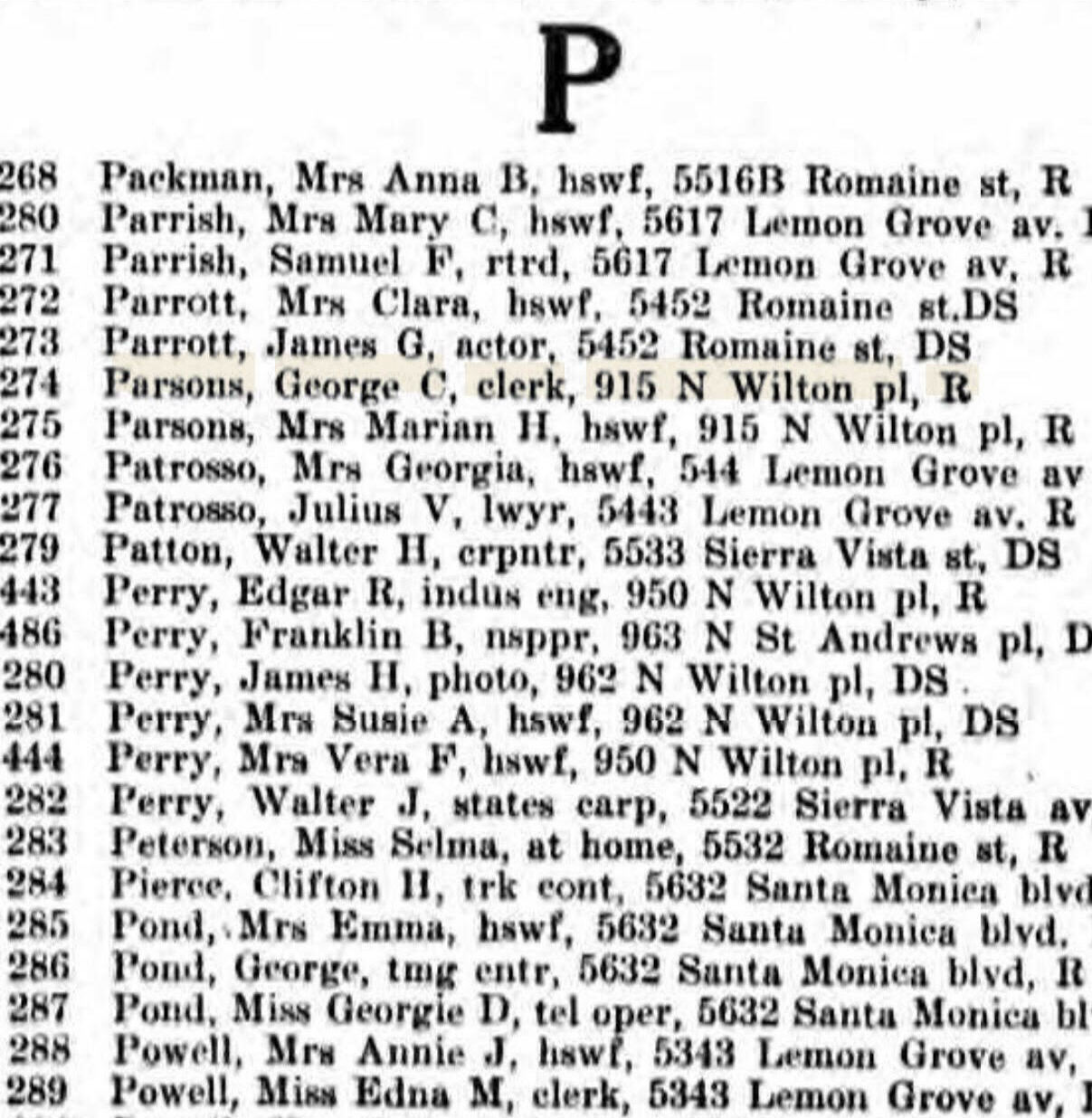
James and Clara

This is a piece of evidence showing James Parrott and his wife Clara Miller. In 1922 they were living together in Los Angeles, where James Parrott had a successful career as an actor. Clara Miller was registered here as a housewife. It is the only file located thus far with James and Clara after their wedding in 1921.

== Filmography ==
=== Actor ===
- 1918 : The Big Idea
- 1918: The Lamb
- 1918: Hello Teacher
- 1918: Beat It
- 1918: The Non-Stop Kid
- 1918: The City Slicker
- 1918: Are Crooks Gishonest?
- 1918: Fire The Cook
- 1918: Beach Nuts
- 1918: Bees In His Bonnet
- 1918: Swing Your Partners
- 1918: Check Your Baggage
- 1918 : Hit Him Again
- 1918 : A Gasoline Wedding
- 1918 : Look Pleasant, Please
- 1918 : Here Come the Girls
- 1918 : Let's Go
- 1918 : On the Jump
- 1918 : Follow the Crowd
- 1918 : Pipe the Whiskers
- 1918 : It's a Wild Life
- 1918 : Hey There!
- 1918 : Kicked Out
- 1918 : Two-Gun Gussie
- 1918 : Fireman Save My Child
- 1918 : Sic 'Em, Towser
- 1918 : Somewhere in Turkey
- 1918 : An Ozark Romance
- 1918 : Kicking the Germ Out of Germany
- 1918 : That's Him
- 1918 : Bride and Gloom
- 1918 : Two Scrambled
- 1918 : No Place Like Jail
- 1918 : Why Pick on Me?
- 1918 : Just Rambling Along
- 1918 : Hear 'Em Rave
- 1918 : She Loves Me Not
- 1919 : An Auto Nut
- 1919 : Do You Love Your Wife?
- 1919 : Wanted - $5,000
- 1919 : Love's Young Scream
- 1919 : Going! Going! Gone!
- 1919 : Hustling for Health
- 1919 : Ask Father
- 1919 : On The Fire
- 1919 : Hoots Mon!
- 1919 : I'm on My Way
- 1919 : Look Out Below!
- 1919 : The Dutiful Dub
- 1919 : Next Aisle Over
- 1919 : A Sammy in Siberia
- 1919 : Just Dropped In
- 1919 : Young Mr. Jazz
- 1919 : Crack Your Heels
- 1919 : Ring Up the Curtain
- 1919 : Si, Senor
- 1919 : Pistols for Breakfast
- 1919 : Swat the Crook
- 1919 : Off the Trolley
- 1919 : At the Old Stage Door
- 1919 : A Jazzed Honeymoon
- 1919 : Count Your Change
- 1919 : Chop Suey & Co.
- 1919 : Heap Big Chief
- 1919 : Don't Shove
- 1919 : All At Sea
- 1920 : His First Flat Tire
- 1920 : Black Eyes and Blue
- 1921 : Big Town Ideas
- 1922 : Try, Try Again
- 1922 : Paste and Paper
- 1922 : Loose Change
- 1922 : Rich Man, Poor Man
- 1922 : Stand Pat
- 1922 : Friday the Thirteenth
- 1922 : The Late Lamented
- 1922 : A Bed of Roses
- 1922 : The Sleuth
- 1922 : Busy Bees
- 1922 : The Bride-to-Be
- 1922 : Take Next Car
- 1922 : Touch All the Bases
- 1922 : The Truth Juggler
- 1922 : Rough on Romeo
- 1922 : Wet Weather
- 1922 : The Landlubber
- 1922 : Bone Dry
- 1922 : Soak the Shiek
- 1922 : Face the Camera
- 1922 : The Uppercut
- 1922 : Out On Bail
- 1922 : Shiver and Shake
- 1922 : The Golf Bug
- 1922 : Shine 'Em Up!
- 1922 : Washed Ashore
- 1922 : Harvest Hands
- 1922 : The Flivver
- 1922 : Blaze Away
- 1922 : I'll Take Vanilla
- 1922 : Fair Week
- 1922 : The White Blacksmith
- 1922 : Fire the Fireman
- 1923 : Post No Bills
- 1923 : Watch Your Wife
- 1923 : Mr. Hyppo
- 1923 : Don't Say Die
- 1923 : Jailed and Bailed
- 1923 : A Loose Tightwad
- 1923 : Tight Shoes
- 1923 : Do Your Stuff
- 1923 : Shoot Straight
- 1923 : For Safe Keeping
- 1923 : Bowled Over
- 1923 : Get Your Man
- 1923 : The Smile Wins
- 1923 : Good Riddance
- 1923 : Speed the Swede
- 1923 : Sunny Spain
- 1923 : For Art's Sake
- 1923 : Fresh Eggs
- 1923 : Dogs Of War!
- 1923 : Uncovered Wagon
- 1923 : For Guests Only
- 1923 : Jack Frost
- 1923 : Live Wires
- 1923 : Take the Air
- 1923 : Finger Prints
- 1923 : Winner Take All
- 1923 : No Pets
- 1923 : Dear Ol' Pal
- 1923 : Join the Circus
- 1924 : Get Busy
- 1924 : Sittin' Pretty
- 1925 : Whispering Lions
- 1925 : The Caretaker's Daughter
- 1925 : Are Parents Pickles?
- 1925 : Whistling Lions
- 1926 : Between Meals
- 1926 : Don't Butt In
- 1926 : Soft Pedal
- 1926 : Pay the Cashier
- 1926 : The Only Son
- 1926 : Hired and Fired
- 1926 : The Old War-Horse
- 1931 : Pardon Us
- 1934 : Washee Ironee

=== Director ===
- 1921 : The Pickaninny
- 1922 : Mixed Nuts
- 1924 : Just a Minute
- 1924 : Hard Knocks
- 1924 : Love's Detour
- 1924 : The Fraidy Cat
- 1924 : Don't Forget
- 1925 : Should Sailors Marry?
- 1926 : The Cow's Kimona
- 1926 : On the Front Page
- 1926 : There Ain't No Santa Claus
- 1927 : Many Scrappy Returns
- 1927 : Are Brunettes Safe?
- 1927 : A One Mama Man
- 1927 : Forgotten Sweeties
- 1927 : Bigger and Better Blondes
- 1927 : Fluttering Hearts
- 1927 : What Women Did for Me
- 1927 : The Sting of Stings
- 1927 : The Lighter That Failed
- 1927 : Now I'll Tell One
- 1927 : Us
- 1927 : Assistant Wives
- 1927 : Never the Dames Shall Meet
- 1928 : All for Nothing
- 1928 : Galloping Ghosts
- 1928 : Their Purple Moment
- 1928 : Should Married Men Go Home?
- 1928 : Two Tars
- 1928 : Habeas Corpus
- 1928 : Chasing Husbands
- 1929 : Ruby Lips
- 1929 : Lesson No. 1
- 1929 : Happy Birthday
- 1929 : Furnace Trouble
- 1929 : Stewed, Fried and Boiled
- 1929 : Perfect Day
- 1929 : They Go Boom!
- 1929 : The Hoose-Gow
- 1930 : La Vida nocturna
- 1930 : Une nuit extravagante
- 1930 : Tiembla y Titubea
- 1930 : Der Spuk um Mitternacht
- 1930 : Radiomanía
- 1930 : Noche de duendes
- 1930 : Feu mon oncle
- 1930 : Night Owls
- 1930 : Blotto
- 1930 : Brats
- 1930 : Below Zero
- 1930 : Hog Wild
- 1930 : The Laurel-Hardy Murder Case
- 1930 : Another Fine Mess
- 1931 : La Señorita de Chicago
- 1931 : Los Presidiarios
- 1931 : Be Big!
- 1931 : The Pip from Pittsburgh
- 1931 : Monerías
- 1931 : Rough Seas
- 1931 : One of the Smiths
- 1931 : Pardon Us
- 1931 : The Panic Is On
- 1931 : Skip the Maloo!
- 1931 : What a Bozo!
- 1932 : Helpmates
- 1932 : The Music Box
- 1932 : The Chimp
- 1932 : County Hospital
- 1932 : Young Ironsides
- 1932 : Girl Grief
- 1932 : Now We'll Tell One
- 1932 : Mr. Bride
- 1933 : Twice Two
- 1933 : Twin Screws
- 1934 : Mixed Nuts
- 1934 : A Duke for a Day
- 1934 : Benny from Panama
- 1934 : Washee Ironee
- 1934 : Opened by Mistake
- 1935 : Treasure Blues
- 1935 : Sing, Sister, Sing
- 1935 : The Tin Man
- 1935 : The Misses Stooge
- 1935 : Do Your Stuff

=== Writer ===
- 1925 : Chasing the Chaser
- 1925 : Unfriendly Enemies
- 1925 : Laughing Ladies
- 1926 : Your Husband's Past
- 1926 : Wandering Papas
- 1926 : Say It with Babies
- 1926 : Never Too Old
- 1926 : Along Came Auntie
- 1926 : Should Husbands Pay?
- 1926 : Wise Guys Prefer Brunettes
- 1926 : Get 'Em Young
- 1926 : On the Front Page
- 1928 : Galloping Ghosts
- 1928 : Should Married Men Go Home?
- 1937 : Way Out West
- 1938 : Swiss Miss
- 1938 : Block-Heads
