= All Lit Up =

- Directed by: Fred C. Newmeyer
- Produced by: Rolin & Hal Roach
- Starring: Snub Pollard; Marie Mosquini
- Distributed by: Pathé Exchange
- Release date: February 1, 1920
- Running time: 1 reel (13 minutes)
- Country: USA
- Language: English

All Lit Up is a 1920 American silent short comedy film directed by Fred C. Newmeyer and starring Harry "Snub" Pollard and Marie Mosquini. It was produced by Rolin Films and put out or distributed through Pathé Exchange. Some listings of this movie have director Harry A. Pollard as the star instead of the comedian whose name is also Harry.

== Cast ==
- Snub Pollard as The Dandy
- Marie Mosquini as The Girl
- Sunshine Sammy Morrison as The Kid
- Noah Young as The Husband
- Eddie Boland as The Drunk
- Sammy Brooks as ?

== Preservation ==
The film is on DVD and is preserved in the Library of Congress collection.
