= Ring Up the Curtain =

1919 film

- Directed by: Alfred J. Goulding
- Produced by: Hal Roach
- Starring: Harold Lloyd
- Distributed by: Pathé Exchange
- Release date: April 27, 1919
- Running time: 12 minutes
- Country: United States
- Languages: Silent; English intertitles

Ring Up the Curtain is a 1919 American short comedy film featuring Harold Lloyd. The film survives and is available on DVD.

== Plot ==
A troupe of performers arrives for a performance at a local opera house. Shortly before their arrival, the opera house's short-tempered manager fires the majority of the stage hands for drunkenness, leaving only Harold. Harold agrees to try to run the activities behind the stage by himself. Trouble starts when Harold accidentally sets a snake charmer's animal free. Harold is smitten by the attractive Leading Lady who openly flirts with him. A jealous Harold enters the stage and ruins a dramatic scene where the villainous Leading Man tries to kiss the Leading Lady. This starts a wild brawl onstage. The show ends abruptly and the Leading Lady sadly informs Harold that she is now destitute. Harold gives her some money. Seconds later she leaves arm-in-arm with the actor who had played the villain. Harold realizes he has been conned: "There's a sucker born every minute--and I must have been twins!" The film ends with Harold turning on the gas in a dressing room, seemingly to commit suicide.

== Cast ==
- Harold Lloyd as The Stage Hand
- Bebe Daniels as The Leading Lady
- Snub Pollard as The Leading Man
- Bud Jamison as An Actor
- Noah Young as An Actor
- Edith Depew
- Florence Depew
- Billy Fay
- William Gillespie
- Oscar Larson
- James Parrott
- William Petterson
- Emmy Wallace (as Emmylou Wallace)
- Dorothea Wolbert
- Sammy Brooks as Troup Manager (uncredited)
- Helen Gilmore as Manager's Wife (uncredited)
- Estelle Harrison as Actress (uncredited)
- Wallace Howe as Conductor (uncredited)
- Dee Lampton as Actor (uncredited)
- Marie Mosquini as Actress (uncredited)
- Fred C. Newmeyer as Stagehand (uncredited)
- Charles Stevenson as Stagehand (uncredited)

== See also ==
- Harold Lloyd filmography
