= Sammy Brooks =

American actor (1891–1951)

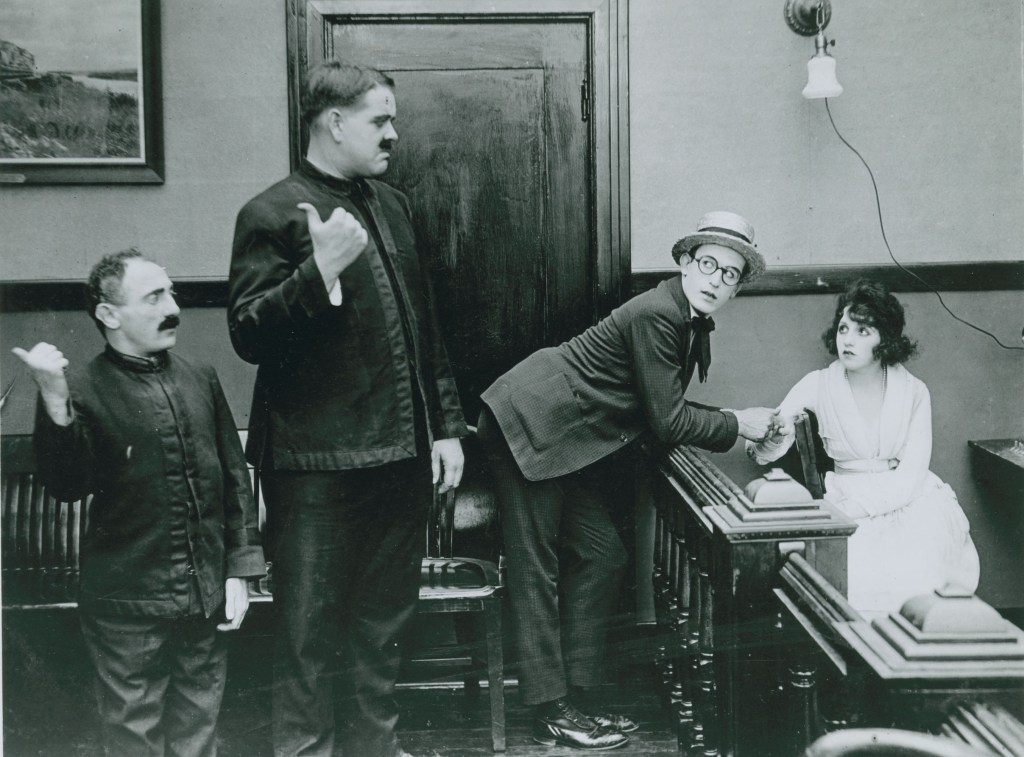
- Brooks (far left) in Ask Father, 1919
- Born: July 10, 1891; New York City, U.S.
- Died: May 16, 1951 (aged 59); Los Angeles, California, U.S.
- Occupation: Actor
- Years active: 1916–1938

Sammy Brooks (July 10, 1891 – May 16, 1951) was an American film actor. He appeared in 218 films between 1916 and 1938. He was born in New York City and died in Los Angeles, California.

== Selected filmography ==
- Luke, the Candy Cut-Up (1916)
- Luke Pipes the Pippins (1916)
- Luke's Double (1916)
- Luke's Late Lunchers (1916)
- Luke Laughs Last (1916)
- Luke's Society Mixup (1916)
- Luke Rides Roughshod (1916)
- Luke, Crystal Gazer (1916)
- Luke's Lost Lamb (1916)
- Luke Does the Midway (1916)
- Luke Joins the Navy (1916)
- Luke and the Mermaids (1916)
- Luke's Speedy Club Life (1916)
- Luke and the Bang-Tails (1916)
- Luke, the Chauffeur (1916)
- Luke's Preparedness Preparations (1916)
- Luke, the Gladiator (1916)
- Luke, Patient Provider (1916)
- Luke's Newsie Knockout (1916)
- Luke's Movie Muddle (1916)
- Luke, Rank Impersonator (1916)
- Luke's Fireworks Fizzle (1916)
- Luke Locates the Loot (1916)
- Luke's Shattered Sleep (1916)
- Luke's Lost Liberty (1917)
- Luke's Trolley Troubles (1917)
- Lonesome Luke, Lawyer (1917)
- Lonesome Luke's Lively Life (1917)
- Lonesome Luke on Tin Can Alley (1917)
- Lonesome Luke's Honeymoon (1917)
- Lonesome Luke, Plumber (1917)
- Stop! Luke! Listen! (1917)
- Lonesome Luke, Messenger (1917)
- Lonesome Luke, Mechanic (1917)
- Lonesome Luke's Wild Women (1917)
- Over the Fence (1917)
- Lonesome Luke Loses Patients (1917)
- Pinched (1917)
- By the Sad Sea Waves (1917)
- Birds of a Feather (1917)
- Bliss (1917)
- Rainbow Island (1917)
- Love, Laughs and Lather (1917)
- The Flirt (1917)
- Clubs Are Trump (1917)
- All Aboard (1917)
- We Never Sleep (1917)
- Move On (1917)
- Bashful (1917)
- Step Lively (1917)
- The Big Idea (1917)
- The Tip (1918)
- The Lamb (1918)
- Hit Him Again (1918)
- Beat It (1918)
- A Gasoline Wedding (1918)
- Look Pleasant, Please (1918)
- Here Come the Girls (1918)
- Let's Go (1918)
- On the Jump (1918)
- Pipe the Whiskers (1918)
- It's a Wild Life (1918)
- Hey There! (1918)
- Kicked Out (1918)
- The Non-Stop Kid (1918)
- Two-Gun Gussie (1918)
- Fireman Save My Child (1918)
- The City Slicker (1918)
- Sic 'Em, Towser (1918)
- Somewhere in Turkey (1918)
- Are Crooks Dishonest? (1918)
- An Ozark Romance (1918)
- Bees in His Bonnet (1918)
- Swing Your Partners (1918)
- Why Pick on Me? (1918)
- Take a Chance (1918)
- She Loves Me Not (1918)
- Wanted - $5,000 (1919)
- Going! Going! Gone! (1919)
- Ask Father (1919)
- On the Fire (1919)
- I'm on My Way (1919)
- Look Out Below (1919)
- The Dutiful Dub (1919)
- Next Aisle Over (1919)
- A Sammy In Siberia (1919)
- Just Dropped In (1919)
- Young Mr. Jazz (1919)
- Crack Your Heels (1919)
- Ring Up the Curtain (1919)
- Si, Senor (1919)
- Before Breakfast (1919)
- The Marathon (1919)
- Pistols for Breakfast (1919)
- Swat the Crook (1919)
- Off the Trolley (1919)
- Spring Fever (1919)
- Billy Blazes, Esq. (1919)
- Just Neighbors (1919)
- At the Old Stage Door (1919)
- Never Touched Me (1919)
- A Jazzed Honeymoon (1919)
- Count Your Change (1919)
- Chop Suey & Co. (1919)
- Heap Big Chief (1919)
- Don't Shove (1919)
- Be My Wife (1919)
- The Rajah (1919)
- He Leads, Others Follow (1919)
- Soft Money (1919)
- Count the Votes (1919)
- Pay Your Dues (1919)
- His Only Father (1919)
- Bumping Into Broadway (1919)
- Captain Kidd's Kids (1919)
- From Hand to Mouth (1919)
- All Lit Up (1920)
- His Royal Slyness (1920)
- Haunted Spooks (1920)
- An Eastern Westerner (1920)
- Number, Please? (1920)
- Now or Never (1921)
- Among Those Present (1921)
- The Noon Whistle (1923)
- Under Two Jags (1923)
- Pick and Shovel (1923)
- Collars and Cuffs (1923)
- Kill or Cure (1923)
- Oranges and Lemons (1923)
- A Man About Town (1923)
- Frozen Hearts (1923)
- The Soilers (1923)
- Scorching Sands (1923)
- Smithy (1924)
- Postage Due (1924)
- Zeb vs. Paprika (1924)
- Brothers Under the Chin (1924)
- Near Dublin (1924)
- Rupert of Hee Haw (1924)
- Wide Open Spaces (1924)
- Short Kilts (1924)
- Wild Papa (1925)
- Isn't Life Terrible? (1925)
- Should Sailors Marry? (1925)
- Wandering Papas (1926)
- Madame Mystery (1926)
- Say It with Babies (1926)
- Long Fliv the King (1926)
- Raggedy Rose (1926)
- Bromo and Juliet (1926)
- Berth Marks (1929)
