= Bud Jamison =

American actor (1894–1944)

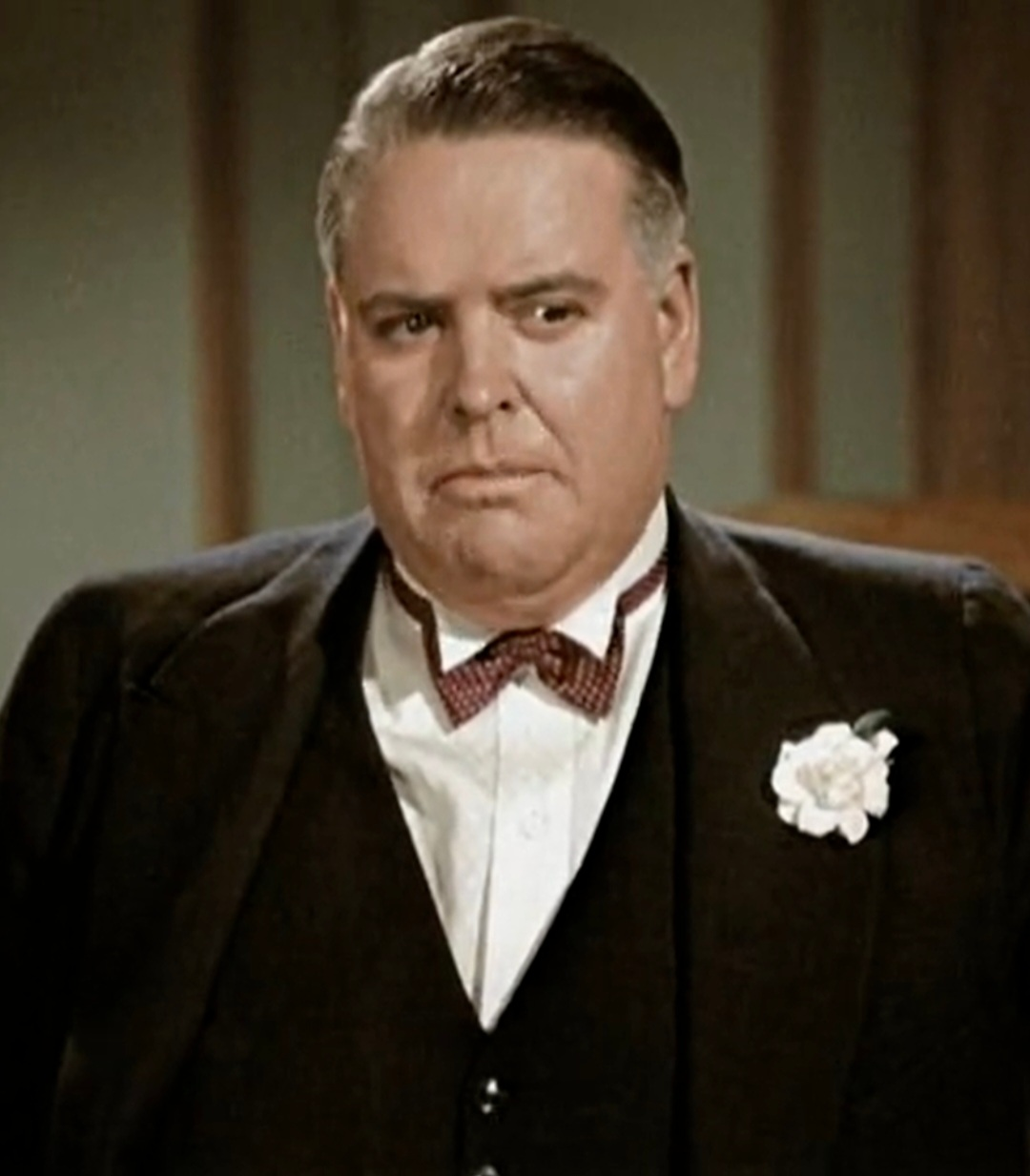
- Jamison in Disorder in the Court (1936)
- Born: William Edward Jamison; February 15, 1894; Vallejo, California, U.S.
- Died: September 30, 1944 (aged 50); Hollywood, California, U.S.
- Resting place: Inglewood Park Cemetery, Inglewood, California
- Occupation: Actor
- Years active: 1915–1944
- Spouse: Georgia Kathleen Holland (m. 1921)

William Edward "Bud" Jamison (February 15, 1894 – September 30, 1944) was an American film actor. He appeared in 450 films between 1915 and 1944, notably appearing in many shorts with The Three Stooges as a foil.

== Career ==
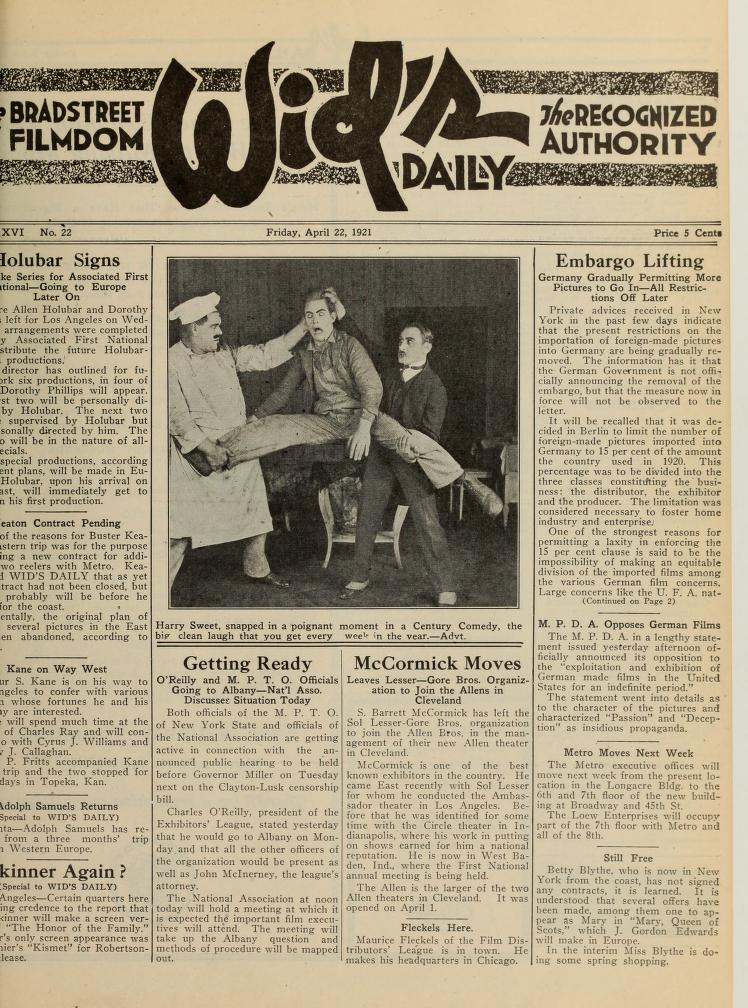
Chef Bud Jamison wishbones Harry Sweet in this Wid's Daily 1921 ad.

Born in Vallejo, California, Jamison joined the ranks of stage and vaudeville performers making movies in California. Jamison's husky build and willingness to participate in messy slapstick and rowdy action guaranteed him work in silent comedies. In 1915 he was a member of Charlie Chaplin's stock company at Essanay Studios. From there he moved to the Hal Roach studio, playing hot-tempered comic foils for Harold Lloyd, Snub Pollard, and Stan Laurel. In the 1920s, he joined Universal Pictures' short-comedy contingent, and later worked in Mack Sennett comedies.

In his earliest films, Jamison looked too young to be totally convincing in heavy makeup as a veteran policeman, detective, or authority figure. As the years progressed, he grew into these roles, and by the time sound films arrived he was well established as a reliable character comedian.

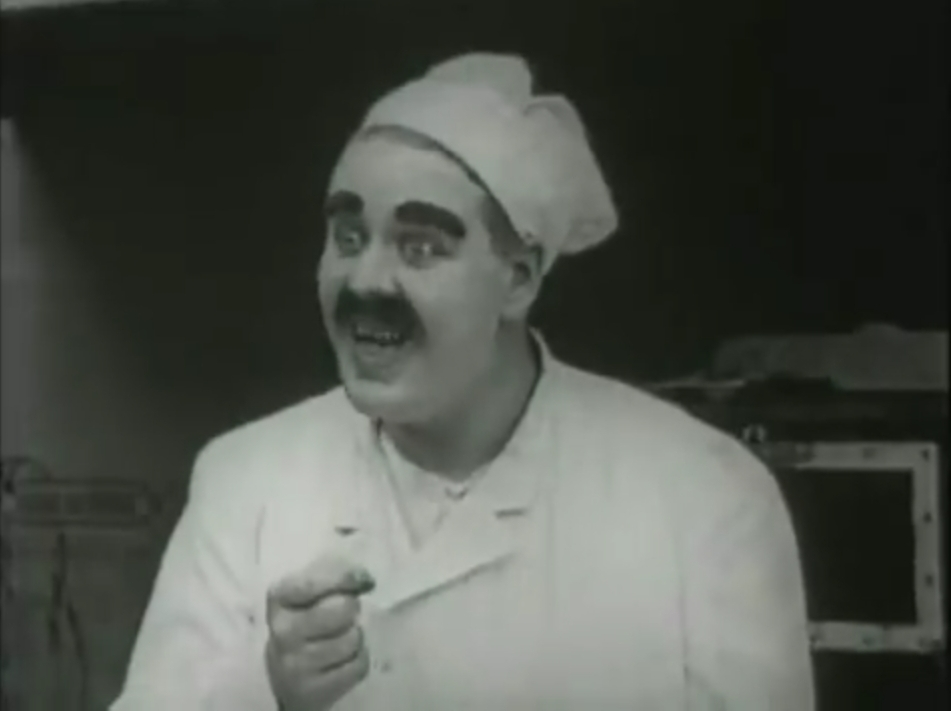
Bud Jamison in Just Rambling Along (1918)

Jamison had a superb tenor singing voice, and loved to sing when not filming. Sound movies gave producers a chance to exploit his singing, and for the rest of his career he would occasionally be called upon to vocalize in films. A brief series of color travelogues filmed in 1930, featured Jamison and comic Jimmie Adams as "The Rolling Stones", two singing vagabonds seeing the country. Jamison would be hired just for his singing, as in Pot o' Gold where he plays a vagrant who harmonizes in jail.

Jamison continued to play cops, robbers, bosses, servants, and various professional men who clash with comedy stars. He appeared opposite Bing Crosby, W. C. Fields, and Andy Clyde in Sennett's talkies. Like other members of the two-reel-comedy community, he found work at various studios: Hal Roach (with Thelma Todd and ZaSu Pitts, and Charley Chase), Educational Pictures (with Buster Keaton), RKO Radio Pictures (with Clark & McCullough, Leon Errol, and Edgar Kennedy), and Columbia Pictures (with Keaton, Clyde, Chase, Harry Langdon, and The Three Stooges, among many others).

=== The Three Stooges ===
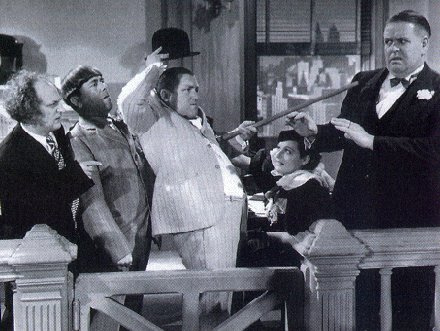
Jamison (right) endures The Three Stooges' disruptive courtroom behavior in Disorder in the Court, 1936

Jamison acted at Columbia Pictures in their short subjects, primarily with the Three Stooges. He appeared in 38 Stooge entries over 10 years, including their debut, Woman Haters (1934). Jamison was a comic foil for the team. He also sings "You'll Never Know Just What Tears Are" in the Three Stooges film A Ducking They Did Go (1939). Stooge leader Moe Howard (who referred to Jamison as "Buddy Jamison") recalled singing barbershop harmony with Charley Chase, actor Vernon Dent, and Jamison many times on movie sets. His last appearance with the Three Stooges was in Crash Goes the Hash (1944) as the majordomo, Lord Flint.

== Death ==
There are conflicting reports regarding Jamison's cause of death. He died on September 30, 1944, at age 50, one day after completing work on the film Nob Hill. Some sources indicate that Jamison developed a blood infection or kidney cancer and because he was a devout Christian Scientist, refused blood transfusions that resulted in his death. However, several surviving family members have stated that Jamison had been suffering from phlebitis in his leg during the final week of filming Nob Hill and refused to seek medical help due to his "the show must go on" mentality (as opposed to religious reasons). Jamison's family was told that the phlebitis caused a blood clot which traveled to his lung and caused his death.

Jamison's death certificate lists mesenteric thrombosis as the official cause of death, with carcinoma of the right kidney also noted as a condition. Jamison was also a Type 2 diabetic in his later years. He is buried in Inglewood Park Cemetery in Inglewood, California.

== Filmography ==
- A Night Out (1915, Short) as Headwaiter (uncredited)
- The Champion (1915, Short) as Bob Uppercut - Champion (uncredited)
- In the Park (1915, Short) as Edna's Beau (uncredited)
- A Jitney Elopement (1915, Short) as Cop with Baton (uncredited)
- The Tramp (1915, Short) as Third Thief (uncredited)
- By the Sea (1915, Short) as Man in Top Hat (uncredited)
- His Regeneration (1915, Short) (uncredited)
- Shanghaied (1915, Short) as Second Mate - The Other Man (uncredited)
- Burlesque on Carmen (1915, Short) as Soldier of the Guard (uncredited)
- Luke Pipes the Pippins (1916, Short)
- Police (1916, Short) as Third Flophouse Customer (uncredited)
- Luke's Double (1916, Short)
- The Floorwalker (1916, Short) as Small Role (uncredited)
- Luke's Late Lunchers (1916, Short)
- Luke Laughs Last (1916, Short)
- Luke's Fatal Flivver (1916, Short)
- Luke's Society Mixup (1916, Short)
- Luke, Crystal Gazer (1916, Short)
- Luke's Lost Lamb (1916, Short)
- Luke Does the Midway (1916, Short)
- Luke Joins the Navy (1916, Short)
- Luke and the Mermaids (1916, Short)
- Luke's Speedy Club Life (1916, Short)
- Luke and the Bang-Tails (1916, Short)
- Luke, the Chauffeur (1916, Short)
- Luke's Preparedness Preparations (1916, Short)
- Luke, the Gladiator (1916)
- Luke, Patient Provider (1916, Short)
- Luke's Newsie Knockout (1916, Short)
- Luke's Movie Muddle (1916, Short) as Angry customer
- Luke, Rank Impersonator (1916, Short)
- Luke's Fireworks Fizzle (1916, Short)
- Luke Locates the Loot (1916, Short)
- Luke's Shattered Sleep (1916, Short)
- Luke's Lost Liberty (1917) as Large Tramp
- Luke's Busy Day (1917, Short)
- Luke's Trolley Troubles (1917, Short)
- Lonesome Luke, Lawyer (1917, Short)
- Luke Wins Ye Ladye Faire (1917, Short)
- Lonesome Luke's Lively Life (1917, Short)
- Lonesome Luke on Tin Can Alley (1917, Short) as Cafe owner
- Lonesome Luke's Honeymoon (1917, Short)
- Lonesome Luke, Plumber (1917, Short)
- Stop! Luke! Listen! (1917, Short)
- Lonesome Luke, Messenger (1917, Short) as Paper Hanger (uncredited)
- Lonesome Luke, Mechanic (1917, Short)
- Lonesome Luke's Wild Women (1917, Short)
- Over the Fence (1917, Short) as The Boss
- Lonesome Luke Loses Patients (1917, Short)
- Pinched (1917, Short)
- Birds of a Feather (1917, Short)
- From Laramie to London (1917, Short)
- Love, Laughs and Lather (1917, Short)
- Clubs Are Trump (1917, Short)
- We Never Sleep (1917, Short)
- Move On (1917, Short)
- Bashful (1917, Short) (uncredited)
- Step Lively (1917, Short)
- Here Come the Girls (1918, Short)
- A Dog's Life (1918, Short) as Thief (uncredited)
- It's a Wild Life (1918, Short)
- The Non-Stop Kid (1918, Short)
- Two-Gun Gussie (1918, Short)
- Kicking the Germ Out of Germany (1918, Short)
- Triple Trouble (1918, Short) as Tramp (uncredited)
- Two Scrambled (1918, Short)
- Bees in His Bonnet (1918, Short)
- Swing Your Partners (1918, Short)
- No Place Like Jail (1918, Short)
- Why Pick on Me? (1918, Short)
- Nothing But Trouble (1918, Short)
- Just Rambling Along (1918, Short) as Chef
- Hear 'Em Rave (1918, Short)
- Take a Chance (1918, Short)
- She Loves Me Not (1918, Short)
- Do You Love Your Wife? (1919, Short) as Man tending dog
- Wanted - $5,000 (1919, Short)
- Going! Going! Gone! (1919, Short) as Professor Goulash (uncredited)
- Hustling for Health (1919, Short) as Mr. Spotless (uncredited)
- Ask Father (1919, Short) as Guardian at the Door (uncredited)
- On the Fire (1919, Short)
- Hoots Mon! (1919, Short)
- I'm on My Way (1919, Short) (uncredited)
- Look Out Below (1919, Short)
- The Dutiful Dub (1919, Short)
- Young Mr. Jazz (1919, Short) as The Girl's Daddy (uncredited)
- Ring Up the Curtain (1919, Short) as An Actor
- Back to the Woods (1919, Short)
- Pistols for Breakfast (1919, Short)
- Off the Trolley (1919, Short)
- Spring Fever (1919, Short)
- A Jazzed Honeymoon (1919, Short)
- Count Your Change (1919, Short)
- Chop Suey & Co. (1919, Short)
- Heap Big Chief (1919, Short)
- Don't Shove (1919, Short) as Harold's rival
- Be My Wife (1919, Short)
- Laughing Gas (1920, Short)
- Arizona Express (1924) as Thug Driver (uncredited)
- Dante's Inferno (1924) as The Butler (uncredited)
- The Cyclone Rider (1924) as Romulus
- Darwin Was Right (1924) as Alexander
- Troubles of a Bride (1924) as Architect
- Wolves of the Air (1927) as 'Short-Cut' McGee
- Play Safe (1927) as Big Bill
- Long Pants (1927) as Minor Role (uncredited)
- His First Flame (1927) as Hector Benedict
- Closed Gates (1927) as Pat
- Ladies Beware (1927) as Tubbs
- Jake the Plumber (1927) as Fogarty
- A Texas Steer (1927) as Othello
- Buck Privates (1928) as Cupid Dodds
- The Chaser (1928) as The Husband's Buddy
- Heart Trouble (1928) as Contractor
- The Grand Parade (1930) as Honey Sullivan
- Match Play (1930, Short) as Bud Harvey
- Moby Dick (1930) as Shipping Agent - 'Boston Lass' (uncredited)
- Her Man (1930) as Man in Derby (uncredited)
- Sweepstakes (1931) as Singing Waiter in Cantina (uncredited)
- Make Me a Star (1932) as Actor in 'Wide Open Spaces' (uncredited)
- The Dentist (1932, Short) as Charley Frobisher (uncredited)
- The Candid Camera (1932, short) as Policeman (uncredited)
- Hypnotized (1932) as Det. McCarty (uncredited)
- Blue of the Night (1933, Short) as Cop (uncredited)
- Professional Sweetheart (1933) as Sound Effects Man (uncredited)
- Melody Cruise (1933) as Train Conductor (uncredited)
- Dora's Dunking Doughnuts (1933, Short) as Radio Station Manager
- Rafter Romance (1933) as Morton McGillicuddy (uncredited)
- Wonder Bar (1934) as Third Bartender (uncredited)
- Woman Haters (1934, Short) as Club Chairman (uncredited)
- A Very Honorable Guy (1934) as Jerry the Waiter (uncredited)
- The Party's Over (1934) as Man on Streetcar (uncredited)
- Men in Black (1934, Short) as Tiny Patient's Doctor (uncredited)
- Flirting with Danger (1934) as Cafe Customer Vocalist (uncredited)
- Three Little Pigskins (1934, Short)
- The Spirit of 1976 (1935, Short) (uncredited)
- After Office Hours (1935) as Policeman at Patterson's (uncredited)
- The Whole Town's Talking (1935) as Policeman (uncredited)
- The Perfect Clue (1935) as Johnny O'Rourke (uncredited)
- Princess O'Hara (1935) as Fat Man (uncredited)
- Flying Down to Zero (1935, Short)
- Uncivil Warriors (1935, Short) as Col. Buttz (uncredited)
- Unknown Woman (1935) as Policeman (uncredited)
- Shadows of the Orient (1935) as Jake (uncredited)
- The E-Flat Man (1935, Short) as Cop (uncredited)
- Hoi Polloi (1935, Short) as Butler (uncredited)
- The Case of the Lucky Legs (1935) as Bartender (uncredited)
- The Payoff (1935) as Waiter (uncredited)
- In Person (1935) as Man in Elevator (uncredited)
- Three Little Beers (1935, Short) as A. Panther
- Ants in the Pantry (1936, Short) as Professor Repulso (uncredited)
- Movie Maniacs (1936, Short) as Fuller Rath
- Grand Slam Opera (1936, Short) as Arizona Sheriff
- Doughnuts and Society (1936) as Mover #1 (uncredited)
- Heroes of the Range (1936) as Cookie (uncredited)
- On the Wrong Trek (1936, Short) as Gang Leader (uncredited)
- Disorder in the Court (1936, Short) as Defense Attorney (uncredited)
- The Fugitive Sheriff (1936) as Bunkhouse Singer (uncredited)
- Ticket to Paradise (1936) as Taxi Dispatcher
- A Pain in the Pullman (1936, Short) as Johnson (uncredited)
- Whoops, I'm an Indian! (1936, Short) as Pierre (uncredited)
- The Unknown Ranger (1936) as Bartender (uncredited)
- Come and Get It (1936) as Man in Saloon (uncredited)
- Mind Your Own Business (1936) as Carpenter (uncredited)
- Jail Bait (1937, Short) as Police Chief
- Racing Lady (1937) as Racetrack Bettor (uncredited)
- Dizzy Doctors (1937, Short) as Policeman (uncredited)
- Love Nest on Wheels (1937, Short) as The Mortgage Holder
- Melody of the Plains (1937) as Camp Cook
- Too Many Wives (1937) as Edmund (uncredited)
- The Frame-Up (1937) as Hotel Clerk (uncredited)
- Back to the Woods (1937, Short) as Prosecutor (uncredited)
- Girls Can Play (1937) as Murphy the Cop (uncredited)
- Super-Sleuth (1937) as Man with Burning Beard (uncredited)
- Forty Naughty Girls (1937) as Theatre Doorman (uncredited)
- Life Begins with Love (1937) as Detective (uncredited)
- Counsel for Crime (1937) as Jailer (uncredited)
- Murder in Greenwich Village (1937) as Police Officer (uncredited)
- Paid to Dance (1937) as Lieutenant of Police
- Melody of the Plains (1937) as Camp Cook
- All American Sweetheart (1937) as Al (uncredited)
- The Shadow (1937) as Ticket Seller
- Termites of 1938 (1938, Short) as Lord Wafflebottom (uncredited)
- Little Miss Roughneck (1938) (uncredited)
- Wee Wee Monsieur (1938, Short) as Legionnaire Sergeant (uncredited)
- Women in Prison (1938) as Guard (uncredited)
- When G-Men Step In (1938) as Businessman (uncredited)
- Tassels in the Air (1938, Short) as Thaddeus Smirch (uncredited)
- There's Always a Woman (1938) as Jim - Bartender (uncredited)
- Extortion (1938) as Caterer (uncredited)
- Healthy, Wealthy and Dumb (1938, Short) as House Detective (uncredited)
- I'm From the City (1938) as Circus Spectator Next to Rosie (uncredited)
- I Am the Law (1938) as Bartender (uncredited)
- Mutts to You (1938, Short) as Policeman O'Halloran (uncredited)
- Red Barry (1938, Serial) as Stagehand (uncredited)
- Tarnished Angel (1938) as Man with Pocket Watch (uncredited)
- The Storm (1938) as Ship's Officer (uncredited)
- Blondie (1938) as Repossessor (uncredited)
- Three Little Sew and Sews (1939, Short) as Policeman (uncredited)
- The Lone Wolf Spy Hunt (1939) as Nightclub Bartender (uncredited)
- Almost a Gentleman (1939) as Dog Show Announcer (uncredited)
- A Ducking They Did Go (1939, Short) as Police Chief (uncredited)
- Pest from the West (1939, Short) as Neighbor Taking Siesta (uncredited)
- Mooching Through Georgia (1939, Short) as Titus Cobb aka Pa
- Slightly Honorable (1939) as Humboldt, the Cop (uncredited)
- A Plumbing We Will Go (1940, Short) as Police Officer Kelly (uncredited)
- Captain Caution (1940) as Blinks
- Sandy Gets Her Man (1940) as Policeman (uncredited)
- Li'l Abner (1940) as Hairless Joe
- Little Men (1940) as Cop (uncredited)
- Tall, Dark and Handsome (1941) as Bartender (uncredited)
- So Long Mr. Chumps (1941, Short) as Policeman (uncredited)
- So You Won't Squawk! (1941, Short) as Tom (uncredited)
- The Monster and the Girl (1941) as Jim - Monarch Hotel Doorman (uncredited)
- A Girl, a Guy and a Gob (1941) as Tall Bystander (uncredited)
- Dutiful But Dumb (1941, Short) as Army Sergeant (uncredited)
- Pot o' Gold (1941) as Drunken Cellmate (uncredited)
- Model Wife (1941) as Patrolman (uncredited)
- All the World's a Stooge (1941, Short) as Policeman (uncredited)
- Time Out for Rhythm (1941) as Counterman (uncredited)
- I'll Never Heil Again (1941, Short) as Mr. Umpchay (uncredited)
- An Ache in Every Stake (1941, Short) as The Baker (uncredited)
- Pardon My Stripes (1942) as Detective (uncredited)
- Wild Bill Hickok Rides (1942) as Casino Singer (uncredited)
- Jail House Blues (1942) as Guard (uncredited)
- A Tragedy at Midnight (1942) as Cop (uncredited)
- Girls' Town (1942) as 'Miss Ohio Valley' Beauty Contest Announcer (uncredited)
- Yokel Boy (1942) as Cop (uncredited)
- Tramp, Tramp, Tramp (1942) as Fat Man (uncredited)
- Stardust on the Sage (1942) as Blacksmith Mike (uncredited)
- Joan of Ozark (1942) as Policeman (uncredited)
- Her Cardboard Lover (1942) as George - Casino Doorman (uncredited)
- Three Smart Saps (1942, Short) as Party Guest (uncredited)
- Holiday Inn (1942) as Santa Claus (uncredited)
- Even as IOU (1942, Short) as Police Chief (uncredited)
- You Can't Escape Forever (1942) as Villa Gloria Bartender (uncredited)
- Youth on Parade (1942) as Cop (uncredited)
- Sock-a-Bye Baby (1942, Short) as Pete - Motorcycle Cop (uncredited)
- Hello Frisco, Hello (1943) as Member of Barbershop Quartet (uncredited)
- Hit Parade of 1943 (1943) as Escort (uncredited)
- Hangmen Also Die! (1943) as Fat Man (uncredited)
- Coney Island (1943) as Bartender (scenes deleted)
- Back from the Front (1943, Short) as Petty Officer (uncredited)
- Three Little Twirps (1943, Short) as Police Officer (uncredited)
- I Can Hardly Wait (1943, Short) as Dr. A. Yank (uncredited)
- Phony Express (1943, Short) as Red Morgan
- True to Life (1943) as Uncle Jim Farmer (uncredited)
- Crash Goes the Hash (1944, Short) as Lord Flint—Majordomo (final Stooge film)
- Love Your Landlord (1944, Short)
- It Happened Tomorrow (1944) as Policeman at Boardinghouse (uncredited)
- Louisiana Hayride (1944) as Doorman (uncredited)
- Casanova Brown (1944) as Father at Baby Window (uncredited)
- Kansas City Kitty (1944) as Re-po Man from A-1 Piano Co. (uncredited)
- Mrs. Parkington (1944) as Quartet Member (uncredited)
- Lost in a Harem (1944) as Overlord (uncredited)
- Alaska (1944) as Sailor (uncredited)
- She Snoops to Conquer (1944, Short) as Otto Schultz
- Diamond Horseshoe (1945) as Footlight Club Patron (uncredited)
- Nob Hill (1945) as Member of Singing Waiters Quartette (uncredited)
- See My Lawyer (1945)
- Incendiary Blonde (1945) as Head Bartender (uncredited)
