= Be My Wife (1919 film) =

1919 film

- Directed by: Hal Roach
- Written by: H. M. Walker
- Produced by: Hal Roach
- Starring: Harold Lloyd
- Cinematography: Walter Lundin
- Distributed by: Pathé Exchange
- Release date: September 7, 1919
- Running time: 10 minutes
- Country: United States
- Languages: Silent; English intertitles

Be My Wife is a 1919 American silent short comedy film featuring Harold Lloyd. A print of Be My Wife exists at the Arhiva Națională de Filme in Bucharest, Romania.

== Plot ==
According to the copyright description, "Harold Lloyd is employed in the office of a large concern. The Boss advertises for a stenographer and our heroine, Bebe Daniels, applies for the position. Of course, the Boss is impressed with her looks and immediately starts in to make love to her, but Harold outwits him and saves the situation just as the boss’s wife appears on the scene."

== Cast ==
- Harold Lloyd as the boy
- Snub Pollard
- Bebe Daniels
- Sammy Brooks
- Lige Conley (as Lige Cromley)
- Bud Jamison
- Dee Lampton
- Marie Mosquini
- Fred C. Newmeyer (as Fred Newmeyer)
- Charles Stevenson
- Noah Young

== See also ==
- List of American films of 1919
