= Luke and the Bang-Tails =

1916 film

- Directed by: Hal Roach
- Produced by: Hal Roach
- Starring: Harold Lloyd
- Distributed by: Pathé Exchange
- Release date: October 15, 1916
- Running time: 10 minutes
- Country: United States
- Languages: Silent; English intertitles

Luke and the Bang-Tails is a 1916 American silent short comedy film starring Harold Lloyd. A print of the film survives in the film archive of the Museum of Modern Art.

== Cast ==
- Harold Lloyd as Luke
- Bebe Daniels
- Snub Pollard
- Charles Stevenson - (as Charles E. Stevenson)
- Billy Fay
- Fred C. Newmeyer
- Sammy Brooks
- Harry Todd
- Bud Jamison
- Margaret Joslin - (as Mrs. Harry Todd)
- Dee Lampton
- May Cloy
- Mrs. Halliburton
- Clarke Irvine

== See also ==
- Harold Lloyd filmography
