= Young Mr. Jazz =

1919 film

- Full film
- Directed by: Hal Roach
- Produced by: Hal Roach
- Starring: Harold Lloyd
- Release date: April 20, 1919
- Running time: 10 minutes
- Country: United States
- Languages: Silent; English intertitles

Young Mr. Jazz is a 1919 American short comedy film featuring Harold Lloyd. A print of the film survives in the film archive of the Museum of Modern Art.

== Plot ==
Bebe is escorted to a beach by her father. The moment the father walks away from Bebe, Harold approaches her. The father returns and proceeds to violently dissuade Harold's amorous intentions. By tunneling through the sand, Harold manages to speak to Bebe briefly and arranges to take her dancing that night. Shortly after Harold picks her up for their date in his automobile, Bebe's father sees them and angrily follows the couple in his car. Harold and Bebe try to elude him by going into a seedy establishment called the Bowery Cafe. Within a short time both Harold and Bebe have had their money and valuables stolen by a team of pickpockets. Harold realizes his money is gone only when his waiter tries to collect the bill for Harold and Bebe's drinks. The couple dances to avoid a confrontation with the waiter. Eventually Bebe's father enters the cafe and he too is robbed. A large fight ensues in which Harold acrobatically knocks out all the ruffians in the cafe. This action puts Harold in the good graces of Bebe's father.

== Cast ==
- Harold Lloyd as The Boy
- Snub Pollard
- Bebe Daniels
- Sammy Brooks
- Billy Fay
- Mildred Forbes
- Rose Gold
- Lew Harvey
- Wallace Howe
- Bud Jamison
- Margaret Joslin
- Dee Lampton
- Marie Mosquini
- Fred C. Newmeyer
- James Parrott
- Dorothea Wolbert
- Noah Young

== Censorship ==
Before Young Mr. Jazz could be exhibited in Kansas, the Kansas Board of Review required the elimination of a scene where a tough girl seduces a man. The same scene was also removed upon re-release in 1922.

== See also ==
- Harold Lloyd filmography
