= Luke's Fatal Flivver =

1916 film by Hal Roach

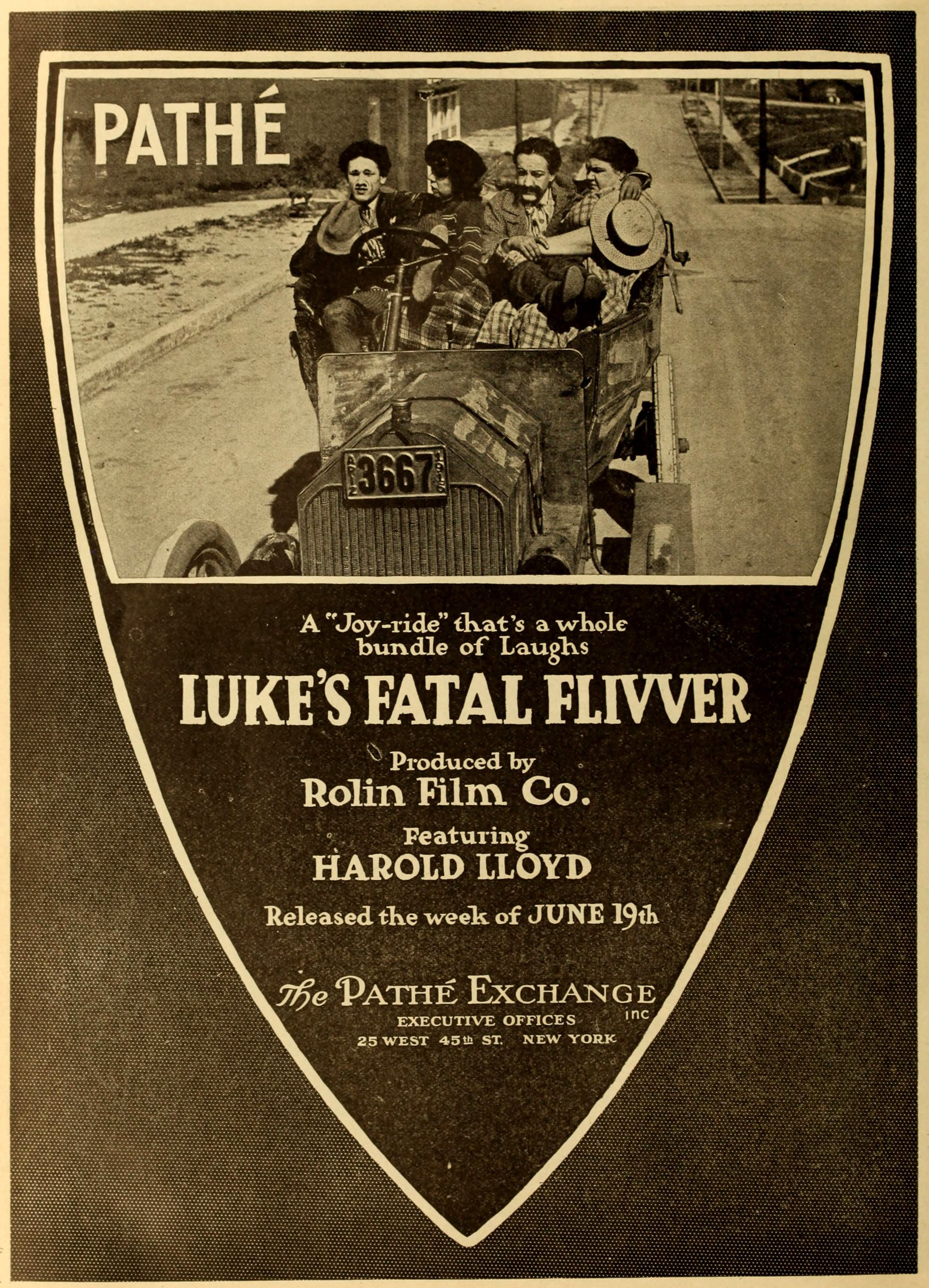
- Directed by: Hal Roach
- Produced by: Hal Roach
- Starring: Harold Lloyd
- Release date: June 19, 1916
- Country: United States
- Languages: Silent; English intertitles

Luke's Fatal Flivver is a 1916 American short comedy film starring Harold Lloyd.

== Cast ==
- Harold Lloyd as Lonesome Luke
- Snub Pollard (as Harry Pollard)
- Bebe Daniels
- Bud Jamison
- Charles Stevenson
- Harry Todd

== See also ==
- Harold Lloyd filmography
