= Luke, the Candy Cut-Up =

1916 film

- Directed by: Hal Roach
- Produced by: Hal Roach
- Starring: Harold Lloyd
- Distributed by: Pathé Exchange
- Release date: January 31, 1916
- Country: United States
- Languages: Silent; English intertitles

Luke, the Candy Cut-Up is a 1916 American short comedy film starring Harold Lloyd. A print of the film survives in George Eastman House.

== Cast ==
- Harold Lloyd - Lonesome Luke
- Snub Pollard
- Gene Marsh
- Bebe Daniels
- Sammy Brooks
- Billy Fay
- Fred C. Newmeyer
- Charles Stevenson
- Otto Fries

== See also ==
- Harold Lloyd filmography
