= A Jazzed Honeymoon =

1919 film

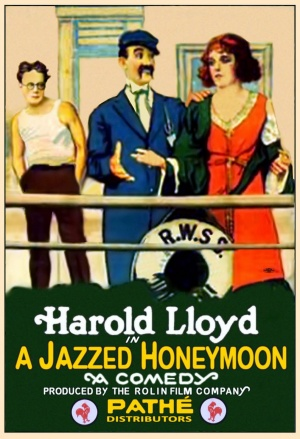
- Film poster
- Directed by: Hal Roach
- Written by: H. M. Walker
- Produced by: Hal Roach
- Starring: Harold Lloyd
- Cinematography: Walter Lundin
- Release date: August 3, 1919
- Running time: 8 minutes
- Country: United States
- Language: Silent with English intertitles

A Jazzed Honeymoon is a 1919 American silent comedy short film featuring Harold Lloyd. In this eight-minute short, a newly married couple have adventures on a steamship.

== Cast ==
- Harold Lloyd as The Boy
- Snub Pollard
- Bebe Daniels
- Sammy Brooks
- Mildred Forbes
- Estelle Harrison
- Wallace Howe
- Bud Jamison
- Margaret Joslin
- Dee Lampton
- Gus Leonard
- Belle Mitchell
- Marie Mosquini
- James Parrott
- William Petterson
- Noah Young

== See also ==
- Harold Lloyd filmography
