= Noah Young =

American actor (1887–1958)

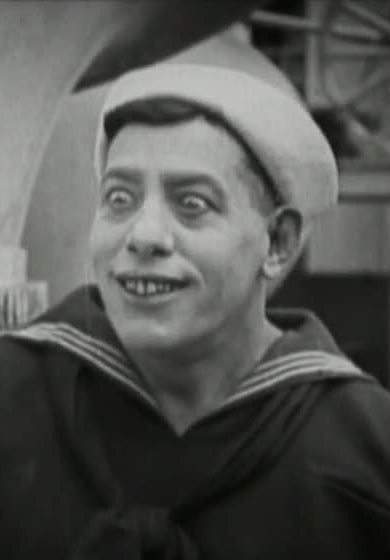
- Young in A Sailor-Made Man (1921)
- Born: Noah Young Jr. February 2, 1887; Cañon City, Colorado, U.S.
- Died: April 18, 1958 (aged 71); Los Angeles, California, U.S.
- Occupations: Actor, weightlifter
- Years active: 1918–1935

Noah Young, Jr. (February 2, 1887 – April 18, 1958) was a champion weightlifter who became a motion-picture actor.

== Biography ==
Young was born in Cañon City, Colorado. His father, Noah Young, was a foreman of the Glenrock coal mine who later became a coal mine inspector for the State of Wyoming; and his mother was Mary Anson, of English descent. Noah Young Sr. came from a family of coal miners in Lancashire, England; and he dabbled in bare-knuckle fighting before heading to America in 1874 and settling in Colorado. He was allegedly once an Indian scout and became friends with William F. Cody.

Noah Young Jr. joined the Hal Roach studios in 1918 as an actor, mainly playing comic villains. He was a mainstay of the Roach company, appearing in dozens of short comedies. He is remembered as a foil for Harold Lloyd in more than 50 films, but Young also appeared opposite Roach stars Snub Pollard, Charley Chase, and Stan Laurel. In 1927 Young was featured in three early Laurel and Hardy comedies.

Young left Roach's employ in 1927. Work became less steady, but his old colleague Harold Lloyd remembered him and featured him in his first talking feature, Welcome Danger (1929). Noah Young worked in three more Lloyd features through 1934.

Noah Young returned to the Hal Roach studio in 1934, again as a member of the stock company. The last film on which he received screen credit was Bum Voyage (1934), a Thelma Todd-Patsy Kelly comedy. Young went on to play uncredited small roles and bits in three more Roach comedies before leaving the studio in 1935.

Metro-Goldwyn-Mayer hired Young to appear in the ensemble of the Nelson Eddy-Jeanette MacDonald musical The Girl of the Golden West (1938), along with fellow silent-screen veterans Billy Bevan and Victor Potel. It was his last assignment; he retired from pictures after the film was finished.

Noah Young died in Los Angeles, California, in 1958.

== Selected filmography ==
- The Non-Stop Kid (1918, Short)
- Kicking the Germ Out of Germany (1918, Short)
- Two Scrambled (1918, Short)
- Bees in His Bonnet (1918, Short)
- No Place Like Jail (1918, Short)
- Nothing but Trouble (1918, Short)
- Just Rambling Along (1918, Short) - Policeman
- Hear 'Em Rave (1918, Short)
- She Loves Me Not (1918, Short)
- Do You Love Your Wife? (1919, Short) - Cop
- Wanted - $5,000 (1919, Short)
- Hustling for Health (1919, Short) - Train Conductor / The Health Inspector (uncredited)
- Ask Father (1919, Short) - Large Office Worker (uncredited)
- On the Fire (1919, Short)
- Hoots Mon! (1919, Short)
- Look Out Below (1919, Short)
- A Sammy in Siberia (1919, Short) - Burly Soldier (uncredited)
- Just Dropped In (1919, Short)
- Young Mr. Jazz (1919, Short) - Bowery Cafe Waiter (uncredited)
- Crack Your Heels (1919, Short)
- Ring Up the Curtain (1919, Short) - An Actor
- Si, Senor (1919, Short)
- Before Breakfast (1919, Short)
- The Marathon (1919, Short) - A Suitor (uncredited)
- Pistols for Breakfast (1919, Short)
- Swat the Crook (1919, Short)
- Off the Trolley (1919, Short)
- Spring Fever (1919, Short) - Office worker with large moustache
- Billy Blazes, Esq. (1919, Short) - Crooked Charley (uncredited)
- Just Neighbors (1919, Short) - (uncredited)
- At the Old Stage Door (1919, Short)
- Never Touched Me (1919, Short)
- A Jazzed Honeymoon (1919, Short)
- Chop Suey & Co. (1919, Short)
- Heap Big Chief (1919, Short)
- Don't Shove (1919, Short) - Tough guy
- Be My Wife (1919, Short)
- The Rajah (1919, Short)
- He Leads, Others Follow (1919, Short)
- Soft Money (1919, Short)
- Count the Votes (1919, Short)
- Pay Your Dues (1919, Short)
- His Only Father (1919, Short)
- Bumping Into Broadway (1919, Short) - The Bearcat's Bouncer
- Captain Kidd's Kids (1919, Short) - Big Pirate (uncredited)
- From Hand to Mouth (1919, Short) - Conspirator (uncredited)
- All Lit Up (1920, Short) - The Husband
- His Royal Slyness (1920, Short) - Count Nichola Throwe
- Haunted Spooks (1920, Short) - (uncredited)
- An Eastern Westerner (1920, Short) - Tiger Lip Tompkins, The Bully
- High and Dizzy (1920, Short) - Man who breaks hotel room door (uncredited)
- Now or Never (1921, Short) - Farm Owner (uncredited)
- Among Those Present (1921, Short) - Horse Handler (uncredited)
- I Do (1921, Short) - The Agitation
- A Sailor-Made Man (1921) - The Rowdy Element
- Grandma's Boy (1922) - Sheriff of Dabney County
- Safety Last! (1923) - The Law
- The Noon Whistle (1923, Short) - A millworker
- Kill or Cure (1923, Short) - Car owner
- Gas and Air (1923, Short)
- Zeb vs. Paprika (1924, Short)
- Brothers Under the Chin (1924, Short)
- Wide Open Spaces (1924, Short)
- The Battling Orioles (1924) - Sid Stanton
- Black Cyclone (1925) - Cowboy (uncredited)
- Should Sailors Marry? (1925, Short) - Verbena's Ex-husband
- For Heaven's Sake (1926) - Bull Brindle, The Roughneck
- Don Mike (1927) - Reuben Pettigill
- Why Girls Say No (1927, Short) - Angry Motorist (uncredited)
- Love Makes 'Em Wild (1927) - Janitor
- The Land Beyond the Law (1927) - Hanzup Harry
- The First Auto (1927) - Ned Jarvish (uncredited)
- Sugar Daddies (1927, Short) - Brittle's Brother-in-law
- Gun Gospel (1927) - Jack Goodshot
- Do Detectives Think? (1927, Short) - The Tipton Slasher (uncredited)
- Ham and Eggs at the Front (1927) - Army Sergeant
- The Battle of the Century (1927, Short) - Thunder-Clap Callahan (uncredited)
- Sharp Shooters (1928) - Tom
- A Thief in the Dark (1928) - Monk
- Welcome Danger (1929) - Officer Patrick Clancy
- Feet First (1930) - Sailor
- Everything's Rosie (1931) - Auction Shill Knocked Out (uncredited)
- Forbidden Adventure (1931) - Bill (uncredited)
- Movie Crazy (1932) - Traffic Cop (uncredited)
- The Cat's-Paw (1934) - Strongarm (uncredited)
- Bum Voyage (1934) - Steward (last credited role)
- The Fixer-Uppers (1935, Short) - Bartender at Café des Artistes (uncredited)
- Vagabond Lady (1935) - Man in Manhole (uncredited)
- Bonnie Scotland (1935) - Highland Quartet Member (uncredited)
- The Girl of the Golden West (1938) - Member of Ensemble (uncredited)
