= He Leads, Others Follow =

1919 film

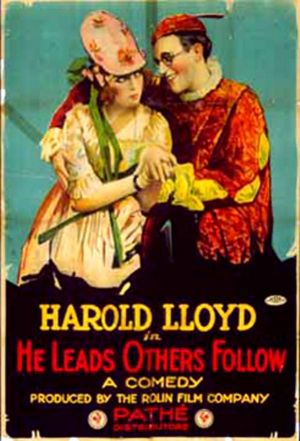
- Theatrical poster to He Leads, Others Follow
- Directed by: Vincent P. Bryan; Hal Roach
- Written by: H.M. Walker
- Produced by: Hal Roach
- Starring: Harold Lloyd
- Cinematography: Walter Lundin
- Production company: Rolin Film Company
- Distributed by: Pathe Exchange
- Release date: September 21, 1919
- Country: United States
- Language: Silent with English intertitles

He Leads, Others Follow is a 1919 American short comedy film starring Harold Lloyd. It is presumed to be lost.

== Cast ==
- Harold Lloyd
- Snub Pollard
- Bebe Daniels
- Sammy Brooks
- Lige Conley (credited as Lige Cromley)
- Charles Inslee
- Dee Lampton
- Marie Mosquini
- Fred C. Newmeyer (credited as Fred Newmeyer)
- Billie Oakley
- H.L. O'Connor
- Charles Stevenson (credited as Charles E. Stevenson)
- Noah Young

== See also ==
- Harold Lloyd filmography
- List of lost films
