= Count Your Change =

1919 film

- Directed by: Alfred J. Goulding
- Written by: H. M. Walker
- Produced by: Hal Roach
- Starring: Harold Lloyd
- Cinematography: Walter Lundin
- Release date: August 10, 1919
- Running time: 12 minutes
- Country: United States
- Languages: Silent; English intertitles

Count Your Change is a 1919 American silent comedy short film featuring Harold Lloyd and Bebe Daniels, and produced by Hal Roach.

== Plot ==
The Boy has just been violently evicted from his boardinghouse for being five weeks behind in his rent. Hungry and penniless, he pilfers a sausage from a hot dog stand—only to have the sausage taken from his hand by a stray dog. The Boy angrily pursues the dog in an elaborate chase until the dog menacingly shows its teeth. Then the chase is reversed and the dog pursues The Boy. The dog eventually chases The Boy into a nearby hotel where he gets into a scuffle with Billy Bullion, a drunken reveler. Shortly thereafter, The Boy prevents a girl, Miss Flighty, from being robbed at gunpoint in her room. The film ends with Miss Flighty and The Boy befriending the dog.

== Cast ==
- Harold Lloyd as the boy
- Snub Pollard as Billy Bullion (as Harry Pollard)
- Bebe Daniels as Miss Flighty
- Sammy Brooks
- Lige Conley (as Lige Cromley)
- Wallace Howe
- Bud Jamison
- Dee Lampton
- Marie Mosquini
- Fred C. Newmeyer (as Fred Newmeyer)
- James Parrott

== See also ==
- List of American films of 1919
- Harold Lloyd filmography
