= Wallace Howe =

American actor (1878–1957)

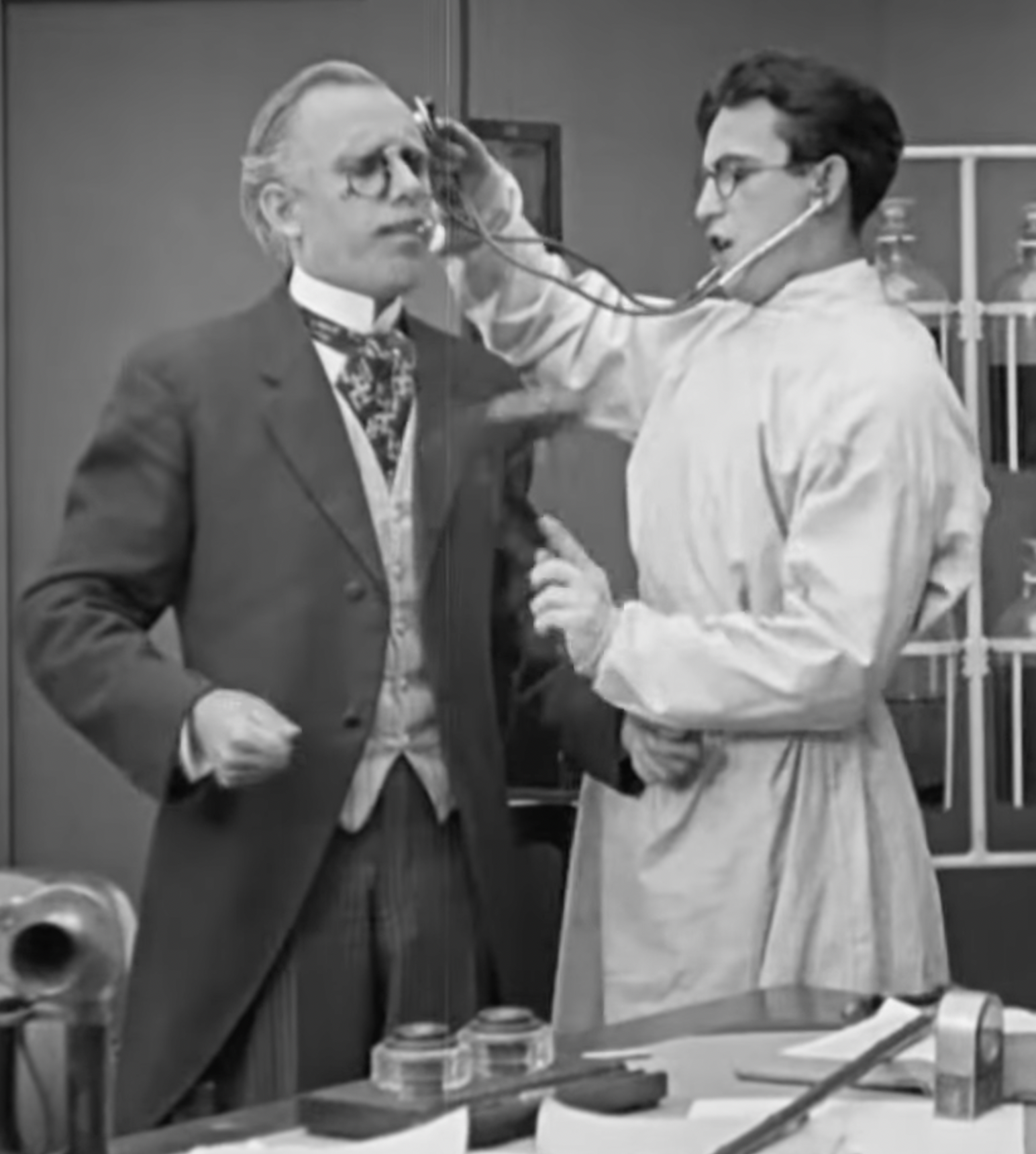
- Wallace Howe (left) opposite Harold Lloyd (right) in High and Dizzy
- Born: Orlando Wallace Howe; March 4, 1878; Fitchburg, Massachusetts, U.S.
- Died: November 23, 1957 (aged 79); Los Angeles, California, U.S.
- Occupation: Film actor
- Years active: 1918–1936

Wallace Howe (March 4, 1878, in Fitchburg, Massachusetts – November 23, 1957, in Los Angeles, California), born Orlando Wallace Howe, was an American film actor. He appeared in 104 films between 1918 and 1936, including many films with Harold Lloyd and Stan Laurel, and in short films with the original Our Gang.

== Filmography ==
- The Milky Way (1936)
- Movie Crazy (1932)
- Horse Shy (1928) short film
- Speedy (1928)
- Behind the Counter (1928) short film
- Good Cheer (1926) short film
- Whispering Lions (1925) short film
- The Freshman (1925)
- Girl Shy (1924)
- Derby Day (1923) short film
- The Whole Truth (1923) short film
- It's a Gift (1923) short film
- Why Worry? (1923)
- The Uncovered Wagon (1923) short film
- Dogs of War (1923) short film
- Back Stage (1923) short film
- Sold at Auction (1923) short film
- Giants vs. Yanks (1923) short film
- Boys to Board (1923) short film
- The Smile Wins (1923) short film
- Safety Last! (1923)
- A Pleasant Journey (1923) short film
- Before the Public (1923) short film
- Jailed and Bailed (1923) short film
- The Champeen (1923) short film
- Dig Up (1923) short film
- Blaze Away (1922) short film
- Dr. Jack (1922)
- Young Sherlocks (1922) short film
- Our Gang (1922) short film
- Out on Bail (1922) short film
- One Terrible Day (1922) short film
- The Landlubber (1922) short film
- Rough on Romeo (1922) short film
- Take Next Car (1922) short film
- The Bride-to-Be (1922) short film
- The Dumb-Bell (1922) short film
- The Late Lamented (1922) short film
- Friday the Thirteenth (1922) short film
- Good Morning Judge (1922) short film
- Punch the Clock (1922) short film
- Grandma's Boy (1922)
- Stand Pat (1922) short film
- Pardon Me (1922) short film
- A Sailor-Made Man (1921)
- On Location (1921) short film
- Fifteen Minutes (1921) short film
- Late Hours (1921) short film
- Never Weaken (1921) short film
- Sweet By and By (1921) short film
- The Chink (1921) short film
- I Do (1921) short film
- On Their Way (1921) short film
- Stop Kidding (1921) short film
- Among Those Present (1921) short film
- Hurry West (1921) short film
- Hobgoblins (1921) short film
- Now or Never (1921) short film
- Running Wild (1921) short film
- Paint and Powder (1921) short film
- Prince Pistachio (1921) short film
- Oh, Promise Me (1921) short film
- Number, Please? (1920) short film
- The Sleepyhead (1920) short film
- Queens Up! (1920) short film
- June Madness (1920) short film
- Mamma's Boy (1920) short film
- Get Out and Get Under (1920) short film
- Run 'Em Ragged (1920) short film
- High and Dizzy (1920) short film
- An Eastern Westerner (1920) short film
- Cracked Wedding Bells (1920) short film
- Haunted Spooks (1920) short film
- His Royal Slyness (1920) short film
- The Dippy Dentist (1920) short film
- From Hand to Mouth (1919) short film
- Don't Shove (1919) short film (as W. Howe)
- Heap Big Chief (1919) short film
- Chop Suey & Co. (1919) short film
- Count Your Change (1919) short film
- A Jazzed Honeymoon (1919) short film
- Never Touched Me (1919) short film
- Spring Fever (1919) short film
- Off the Trolley (1919) short film
- The Marathon (1919) short film
- Si, Senor (1919) short film
- Ring Up the Curtain (1919) short film
- Crack Your Heels (1919) short film
- Young Mr. Jazz (1919) short film
- Just Dropped In (1919) short film
- A Sammy In Siberia (1919) short film
- Next Aisle Over (1919) short film
- Hoot Mon! (1919) short film
- On the Fire (1919) short film
- Ask Father (1919) short film
- Going! Going! Gone! (1919) short film (as W. Howe)
- Take a Chance (1918) short film
- Just Rambling Along (1918) short film
- Nothing But Trouble (1918) short film
- No Place Like Jail (1918) short film
- Kicking the Germ Out of Germany (1918) short film
- Somewhere in Turkey (1918) short film
- The City Slicker (1918) short film
- Two-Gun Gussie (1918) short film
