= A Sammy in Siberia =

1919 film

A Sammy In Siberia
- Directed by: Hal Roach
- Produced by: Hal Roach
- Starring: Harold Lloyd
- Production company: Rolin Film Company
- Distributed by: Pathe Exchange
- Release date: April 6, 1919
- Running time: 10 minutes
- Country: United States
- Language: Silent with English intertitles

A Sammy In Siberia is a 1919 American short comedy film featuring Harold Lloyd.

== Plot ==
An inept American soldier (Lloyd) stationed in Russia during that country's civil war, becomes separated from his unit during a march in heavy snow. He flees from a scrawny, lone wolf and climbs up a tree when it pursues him. He comes to the aid of a young Russian woman (Daniels) who, along with her family, is being harassed by a troop of Bolsheviks. She has escaped from her cabin while the Bolsheviks were drunk on vodka. She encounters Lloyd and the wolf. Lloyd discovers that the wolf is harmless and is something of a pet to the woman. The Bolsheviks see Lloyd and the woman and chase them back to the woman's cabin. Lloyd initially hides in the cabin's attic. Using his wits and an array of stunts, Lloyd manages to drive the Bolsheviks away. The film ends with Lloyd attempting to woo the woman.

== Cast ==
- Harold Lloyd as The Boy
- Snub Pollard as The Russian Commandant
- Bebe Daniels as The Girl
- Sammy Brooks
- Lige Conley (as Lige Cromley)
- Wallace Howe
- Dee Lampton
- Gus Leonard
- Marie Mosquini
- Fred C. Newmeyer
- James Parrott
- E.J. Ritter
- Chase Thorne
- Noah Young

== See also ==
- Harold Lloyd filmography
