= The Rajah (1919 film) =

1919 film

- Directed by: Hal Roach
- Produced by: Hal Roach
- Starring: Harold Lloyd
- Release date: September 14, 1919
- Country: United States
- Languages: Silent; English intertitles

The Rajah is a 1919 American short comedy film directed by Hal Roach and starring Harold Lloyd.

== Cast ==
- Harold Lloyd
- Snub Pollard
- Bebe Daniels
- Sammy Brooks
- Lige Conley
- Dee Lampton
- Marie Mosquini
- Fred C. Newmeyer
- Catherine Proudfit
- E.J. Ritter
- Charles Stevenson (credited as Charles E. Stevenson)
- Chase Thorne
- Noah Young
