= Pistols for Breakfast =

1919 film

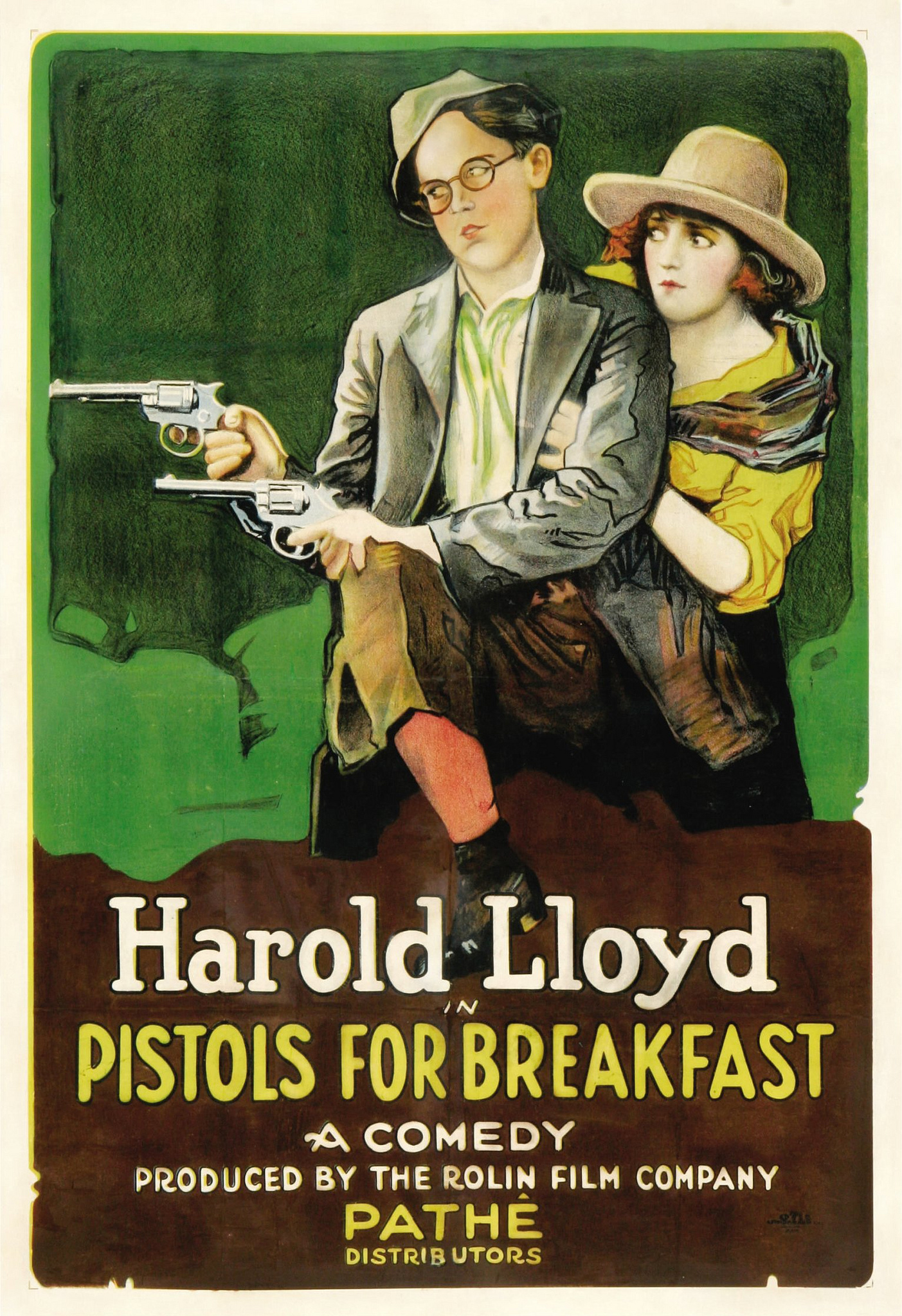
- Directed by: Alfred J. Goulding
- Produced by: Hal Roach
- Starring: Harold Lloyd
- Release date: June 8, 1919
- Running time: 10 minutes
- Country: United States
- Languages: Silent; English intertitles

Pistols for Breakfast is a 1919 American silent comedy short film featuring Harold Lloyd. A print of the film survives in the Museum of Modern Art film archive in New York City.

== Plot ==
A young man (Fay) goes out to eat breakfast with his friend (Harrison). As a restaurant "regular" with a pistol threatens to eat everyone's bacon, the two friends flee.

== Cast ==
- Harold Lloyd
- Snub Pollard
- Bebe Daniels
- Sammy Brooks
- Billy Fay
- Estelle Harrison
- Lew Harvey
- Bud Jamison
- Dee Lampton
- Gus Leonard
- Fred C. Newmeyer
- James Parrott
- Dorothea Wolbert
- Noah Young

== See also ==
- List of American films of 1919
- Harold Lloyd filmography
