= Kicking the Germ Out of Germany =

1918 film

- Directed by: Alfred J. Goulding
- Produced by: Hal Roach
- Starring: Harold Lloyd
- Production company: Rolin Film Company
- Distributed by: Pathé Exchange
- Release date: July 21, 1918
- Running time: 10 minutes
- Country: United States
- Language: Silent with English intertitles

Kicking the Germ Out of Germany is a 1918 American silent comedy short film featuring Harold Lloyd. Formely considered a lost film, until in 2025 a 35mm film print was found with Italian intertitles in the Museo Nazionale Scienza e Tecnologia Leonardo da Vinci in Milan, Italy. The film was subsequently restored and premiered at a screening held at Cinema Lumiere on 22 June 2026.

== Cast ==
- Harold Lloyd as The Boy
- Snub Pollard
- Bebe Daniels
- Lige Conley (credited as Lige Cromley)
- Mildred Forbes
- William Gillespie
- Helen Gilmore
- Max Hamburger
- Estelle Harrison
- Lew Harvey
- Wallace Howe
- Bud Jamison
- Dee Lampton
- Oscar Larson
- Maynard Laswell (credited as M.A. Laswell)
- Grace Madden
- Belle Mitchell
- James Parrott
- Hazel Powell
- Charles Stevenson
- Myrtle Watson
- Noah Young

== See also ==
- Harold Lloyd filmography
- List of rediscovered films
