= Luke's Late Lunchers =

1916 film

- Directed by: Hal Roach
- Produced by: Hal Roach
- Starring: Harold Lloyd
- Distributed by: Pathé Exchange
- Release date: May 22, 1916
- Country: United States
- Languages: Silent; English intertitles

Luke's Late Lunchers is a 1916 American short comedy film starring Harold Lloyd.

== Cast ==
- Harold Lloyd as Lonesome Luke
- Snub Pollard as (as Harry Pollard)
- Bebe Daniels
- Sammy Brooks
- Billy Fay
- Bud Jamison
- Fred C. Newmeyer
- Charles Stevenson
- Harry Todd

== See also ==
- Harold Lloyd filmography
