= Si, Senor =

1919 film

- Directed by: Alfred J. Goulding
- Produced by: Hal Roach
- Starring: Harold Lloyd
- Production company: Rolin Film Company
- Distributed by: Pathe Exchange
- Release date: May 11, 1919
- Running time: One reel
- Country: United States
- Language: Silent with English intertitles

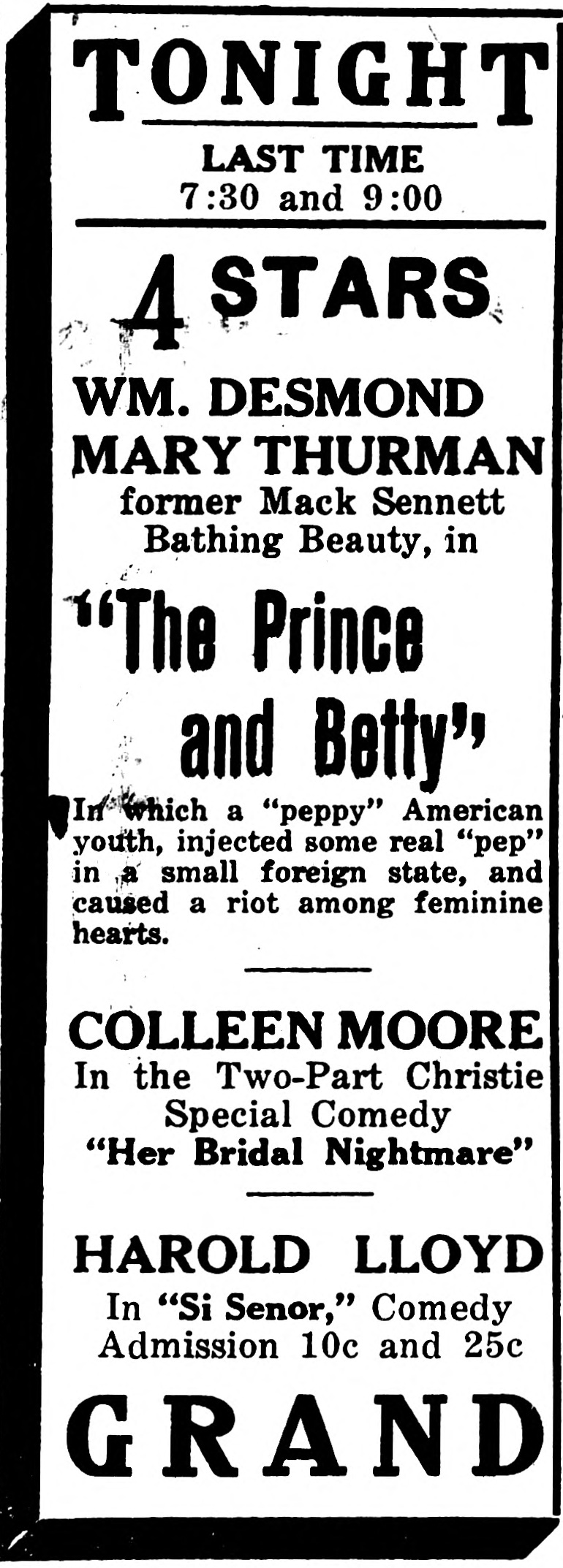
1920 newspaper advertisement for films including ‘Si, Senor’

Si, Senor is a 1919 American short comedy film featuring Harold Lloyd. It is believed to be lost.

== Cast ==
- Harold Lloyd
- Snub Pollard
- Bebe Daniels
- Sammy Brooks
- Billy Fay
- Estelle Harrison
- Lew Harvey
- Wallace Howe
- Dee Lampton
- Marie Mosquini
- Fred C. Newmeyer
- James Parrott
- William Petterson
- Hazel Powell
- Emmy Wallace (credited as Emmylou Wallace)
- Dorothea Wolbert
- Noah Young

== See also ==
- Harold Lloyd filmography
- List of lost films
