= Luke Pipes the Pippins =

1916 film by Hal Roach

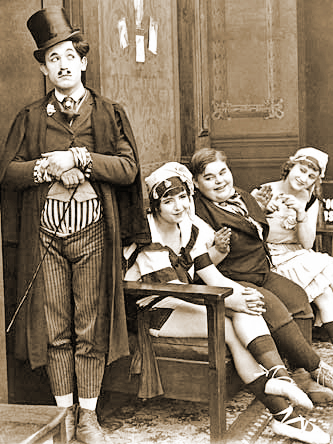
- Directed by: Hal Roach
- Produced by: Hal Roach
- Starring: Harold Lloyd
- Release date: March 15, 1916
- Country: United States
- Languages: Silent; English intertitles

Luke Pipes the Pippins is a 1916 American short comedy film starring Harold Lloyd.

== Cast ==
- Harold Lloyd - Lonesome Luke
- Snub Pollard
- Bebe Daniels
- Sammy Brooks
- Bud Jamison
- Dee Lampton
- Charles Stevenson
- Harry Todd

== See also ==
- Harold Lloyd filmography
