= Charles Stevenson (actor) =

American actor (1887–1943)

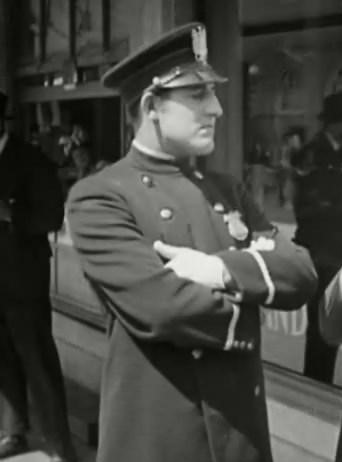
- Stevenson as officer in Number, Please? (1920)
- Born: October 13, 1887; Sacramento, California, US
- Died: July 4, 1943 (aged 55); Palo Alto, California, US
- Occupation: Actor
- Years active: 1914–1925

Charles Stevenson (October 13, 1887 – July 4, 1943) was an American film actor of the silent era. He appeared in 136 films between 1914 and 1925, including a number of Harold Lloyd's films. In Grandma's Boy (1922), he had a larger role as Lloyd's scheming rival who tries to win the same girl. He was born in Sacramento, California, and died in Palo Alto, California.

== Filmography ==
=== 1916 ===
Year	Title	Role	Note
1916	Luke, the Candy Cut-Up	—N/a	Short
1916	Luke Pipes the Pippins	—N/a	Short, Lost film
1916	Luke's Double	—N/a	Short film
1916	Luke's Late Lunchers	—N/a	Short, lost film
1916	Luke Laughs Last	—N/a	Short, lost film
1916	Luke's Fatal Flivver	—N/a	Short, lost film
1916	Luke's Society Mixup	—N/a	Short, lost film
1916	Luke Rides Roughshod	(Unknown) as Charles E. Stevenson	Short, lost film
1916	Luke, Crystal Gazer	(Unknown) as Charles E. Stevenson	Short film
1916	Luke's Lost Lamb	(Unknown) as Charles E. Stevenson	Short, lost film
1916	Luke Does the Midway	(Unknown) as Charles E. Stevenson	Short, lost film
1916	Luke Joins the Navy	Sailor (as Charles E. Stevenson)	Short film
1916	Luke and the Mermaids	(Unknown) as Charles E. Stevenson	Short, lost film
1916	Luke's Speedy Club Life	(Unknown) as Charles E. Stevenson	Short, lost film
1916	Luke and the Bang-Tails	(Unknown) as Charles E. Stevenson	Short film
1916	Luke, the Chauffeur	(Unknown) as Charles E. Stevenson	Short, lost film
1916	Luke's Preparedness Preparations	(Unknown) as Charles E. Stevenson	Short, lost film
1916	Luke, the Gladiator	(Unknown) as Charles E. Stevenson	Short, lost film
1916	Luke, Patient Provider	(Unknown) as Charles E. Stevenson	Short, lost film
1916	Luke's Newsie Knockout	(Unknown) as Charles E. Stevenson	Short, lost film
1916	Luke's Movie Muddle	(Unknown) as Charles E. Stevenson	Short film
1916	Luke, Rank Impersonator	(Unknown) as Charles E. Stevenson	Short, lost film
1916	Luke's Fireworks Fizzle	(Unknown) as Charles E. Stevenson	Short, lost film
1916	Luke Locates the Loot	(Unknown) as Charles E. Stevenson	Short film
1916	Luke's Shattered Sleep	Flophouse Manager (as Charles E. Stevenson)	Short film

=== 1917 ===
Year	Title	Role	Note
1917	Luke's Lost Liberty	(Unknown) (as Charles E. Stevenson)	Short, lost film
1917	Lonesome Luke, Lawyer	(Unknown) (as Charles E. Stevenson)	Short, lost film
1917	Luke Wins Ye Ladye Faire	(Unknown) (as Charles E. Stevenson)	Short, lost film
1917	Lonesome Luke's Lively Life	(Unknown) (as Charles E. Stevenson)	Short, lost film
1917	Lonesome Luke on Tin Can Alley	(Unknown) (as Charles E. Stevenson)	Short film
1917	Lonesome Luke's Honeymoon	(Unknown) (as Charles E. Stevenson)	Short, lost film
1917	Stop! Luke! Listen!	(Unknown) (as Charles E. Stevenson)	Short film
1917	Lonesome Luke, Messenger	—N/a	Short film
1917	Lonesome Luke's Wild Women	(Unknown) as Charles E. Stevenson	Short, lost film
1917	Lonesome Luke Loses Patients	(Unknown) as Charles E. Stevenson	Short, lost film
1917	Pinched	(Unknown) as Charles E. Stevenson	Short film
1917	Birds of a Feather	(Unknown) as Charles E. Stevenson	Short, lost film
1917	From Laramie to London	—N/a	Short, lost film
1917	Love, Laughs and Lather	(Unknown) Charles E. Stevenson	Short, lost film
1917	Clubs Are Trump	(Unknown) Charles E. Stevenson	Short film
1917	All Aboard	The Bag Agent (as C.E. Stevens)	Short film
1917	We Never Sleep	(Unknown) as Charles E. Stevenson	Short, lost film
1917	Move On	—N/a	Short film
1917	Step Lively	(Unknown) as Charles E. Stevenson	Short film
1917	Bashful	—N/a	Short, uncredited
1917	The Big Idea	—N/a	Short, uncredited

=== 1918 ===
Year	Title	Role	Note
1918	The Tip	—N/a	Short film
1918	On the Jump	(Unknown) as Charles E. Stevenson	Short film
1918	Follow the Crowd	—N/a	Short film
1918	It's a Wild Life	—N/a	Short film
1918	Hey There!	Prop Man	Short film
1918	The Non-Stop Kid	Unconfirmed	Short film
1918	Two-Gun Gussie	Whooping-Cough Charlie, the Sheriff	Short film
1918	The City Slicker	(Unknown) as Charles E. Stevenson	Short film
1918	Sic 'Em, Towser	(Unknown) as Charles E. Stevenson	Short, lost film
1918	Somewhere in Turkey	(Unknown) as Charles E. Stevenson	Short film
1918	An Ozark Romance	(Unknown) as Charles E. Stevenson	Short film
1918	Bride and Gloom	(Unknown) as Charles E. Stevenson	Short, lost film
1918	Are Crooks Dishonest?	(Unknown) as C.E. Stevenson	Short film
1918	Kicking the Germ Out of Germany	—N/a	Short, lost film
1918	That's Him	—N/a	Short film
1918	Two Scrambled	—N/a	Short, lost film
1918	Bees in His Bonnet	—N/a	Short, lost film

=== 1919 ===
Year	Title	Role	Note
1919	Do You Love Your Wife?	Detective	Short
1919	Ask Father	The Cop	Short, uncredited
1919	Ring Up the Curtain	Stagehand	Short, uncredited
1919	Just Neighbors	Post Man	Short, uncredited
1919	Spring Fever	Busy Bee counter man	Short
1919	Be My Wife	—N/a	Short
1919	The Rajah	(Unknown) as Charles E. Stevenson	Short, lost film
1919	He Leads, Others Follow	(Unknown) as Charles E. Stevenson	Short, lost film
1919	Soft Money	(Unknown) as Charles E. Stevenson	Short, lost film
1919	Count the Votes	(Unknown) as Charles E. Stevenson	Short, lost film
1919	His Only Father	(Unknown) as Charles E. Stevenson	Short, lost film
1919	Pay Your Dues	(Unknown) as Charles E. Stevenson	Short film
1919	Bumping Into Broadway	—N/a	Short film
1919	Captain Kidd's Kids	Servant	Short, uncredited
1919	From Hand to Mouth	Stolen Wallet Cop	Short, uncredited

=== 1920 ===
Year	Title	Role	Note
1920	His Royal Slyness	Man Who Won't Buy Books	Short, uncredited
1920	Haunted Spooks	Undetermined Secondary Role	Short, uncredited
1920	An Eastern Westerner	The Headwaiter - Card Player	Short, uncredited
1920	High and Dizzy	Police Officer	Short, uncredited
1920	Get Out and Get Under	—N/a	Short, uncredited
1920	Number, Please?	Cop - Man on Rollercoaster	Short, uncredited

=== 1921 ===
Year	Title	Role	Note
1921	Now or Never	Conductor	Short, uncredited
1921	A Sailor-Made Man	Recruiting Officer	Short, uncredited

=== 1922 ===
Year	Title	Role	Note
1922	Grandma's Boy	Harold's Rival	
1922	One Terrible Day	Butler	Short, uncredited
1922	Dr. Jack	Asylum Guard	Uncredited

=== 1923 ===
Year	Title	Role	Note
1923	The Champeen	Officer	Short
1923	A Pleasant Journey	Conductor - Officer	Short
1923	The Shriek of Araby	Luke Hassan (as Charles E. Stevenson)	
1923	Safety Last!	Ambulance Attendant	Uncredited
1923	Boys to Board	Bootlegger	Short
1923	Under Two Jags	Arab Officer (as Charles E. Stevenson)	Short
1923	Dogs of War! (film)	Actor 'Dan' (as Charles E. Stevenson)	Short
1923	Kill or Cure	Door slamming non-customer	Short, uncredited
1923	Gas and Air	Garage Owner	Short
1923	Lodge Night	Auto Thief (as Charles E. Stevenson)	Short
1923	Short Orders	Customer	Short, uncredited
1923	Why Worry?	Revolutionary with Moustache	Uncredited
1923	A Man About Town	Shop Assistant	Short
1923	No Noise	Physician	Short
1923	Stage Fright	Tony the Fruit Vendor	Short
1923	The Whole Truth	Jewish Tailor	Short
1923	Scorching Sands	Arab	Short

=== 1924 ===
Year	Title	Role	Title
1924	Hot Water	Wifey's Big Brother - Charley Stokes	
1924	Girl Shy	Train Conductor	Uncredited

=== 1925 ===
Year	Title	Role	Note
1925	Isn't Life Terrible?	Medical Officer	Short, uncredited
1925	The Freshman	Assistant Coach	Uncredited
1925	Are Parents Pickles?	—N/a	Short, final role

=== Television ===
Year	Title	Role	Note
1960	Mischief Makers	Policeman - Butler - Giovanna de Bullochi	Archive footage, posthumous release
1989	American Masters	Big Brother from Hot Water	Archive footage, posthumous release, episode: Harold Lloyd: The Third Genius
