= Dee Lampton =

American actor

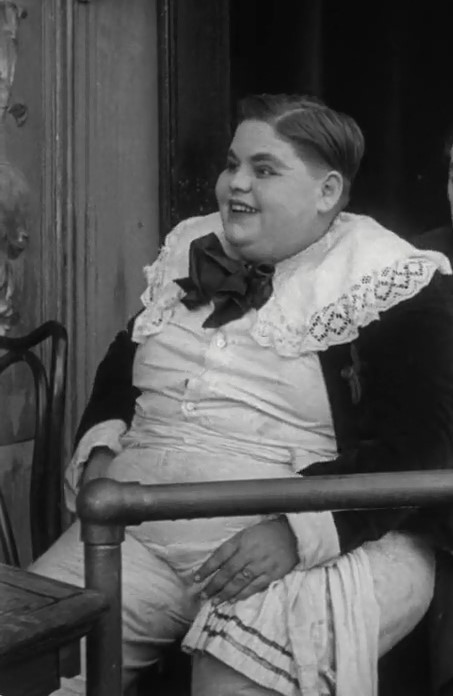
- Dee Lampton in A Night in the Show (1915)
- Born: October 6, 1898; Fort Worth, Texas, US
- Died: September 2, 1919 (aged 20); Los Angeles, California, US
- Occupation: Actor
- Years active: 1915–1919

Dee Lampton (October 6, 1898 – September 2, 1919) was an American film actor of the silent era. Lampton was born in Fort Worth, Texas, and died of appendicitis in Los Angeles on September 2, 1919.

He appeared in 52 films between 1915 and 1920. He was one of the regulars in the Hal Roach crew of actors and was the heavy set character. His last film for Roach wasn't released until the year following his death, due to Harold Lloyd's accident with a prop bomb.

== Selected filmography ==
- Haunted Spooks (1920)
- From Hand to Mouth (1919)
- Bumping Into Broadway (1919)
- I'm on My Way (1919)
- His Only Father (1919)
- Pay Your Dues (1919)
- He Leads, Others Follow (1919)
- The Rajah (1919)
- Be My Wife (1919)
- Don't Shove (1919)
- Heap Big Chief (1919)
- Chop Suey & Co. (1919)
- Count Your Change (1919)
- A Jazzed Honeymoon (1919)
- Spring Fever (1919)
- Swat the Crook (1919)
- Pistols for Breakfast (1919)
- Si, Senor (1919)
- Ring Up the Curtain (1919)
- Young Mr. Jazz (1919)
- A Sammy In Siberia (1919)
- I'm on My Way (1919)
- On the Fire (1919)
- Going! Going! Gone! (1919)
- Wanted - $5,000 (1919)
- She Loves Me Not (1918)
- Take a Chance (1918)
- Kicking the Germ Out of Germany (1918)
- Somewhere in Turkey (1918)
- The City Slicker (1918)
- Follow the Crowd (1918)
- Luke, Patient Provider (1916)
- Luke and the Bang-Tails (1916)
- Luke's Speedy Club Life (1916)
- Luke and the Mermaids (1916)
- Luke Joins the Navy (1916)
- Luke Does the Midway (1916)
- Luke's Lost Lamb (1916)
- Luke, Crystal Gazer (1916)
- Luke Rides Roughshod (1916)
- Luke's Society Mixup (1916)
- Them Was the Happy Days! (1916)
- Luke Pipes the Pippins (1916)
- A Night in the Show (1915)
