= She Loves Me Not (1918 film) =

1918 film

- Produced by: Hal Roach
- Starring: Harold Lloyd
- Distributed by: Pathé Exchange
- Release date: December 29, 1918
- Running time: 10 minutes
- Country: United States
- Languages: Silent; English intertitles

She Loves Me Not is a 1918 American silent comedy short film featuring Harold Lloyd. A print of the film survives at the film archive of the British Film Institute.

== Cast ==
- Harold Lloyd
- Snub Pollard
- Bebe Daniels
- Sammy Brooks
- Billy Fay
- William Gillespie
- Estelle Harrison
- Lew Harvey
- Bud Jamison
- Margaret Joslin
- Dee Lampton
- Oscar Larson
- Marie Mosquini
- James Parrott
- Dorothea Wolbert
- Noah Young
