= Luke Does the Midway =

1916 film by Hal Roach

- Directed by: Hal Roach
- Produced by: Hal Roach
- Starring: Harold Lloyd
- Distributed by: Pathé Exchange
- Release date: August 21, 1916
- Country: United States
- Languages: Silent film English intertitles

Luke Does the Midway is a 1916 American short comedy film featuring Harold Lloyd.

== Cast ==
- Harold Lloyd as Lonesome Luke
- Snub Pollard
- Bebe Daniels
- Charles Stevenson - (as Charles E. Stevenson)
- Billy Fay
- Fred C. Newmeyer
- Sammy Brooks
- Harry Todd
- Bud Jamison
- Margaret Joslin - (as Mrs. Harry Todd)
- Dee Lampton
- May Cloy
- Mrs. Halliburton

== See also ==
- Harold Lloyd filmography
