= Chop Suey & Co. =

1919 American short comedy film

- Directed by: Hal Roach
- Written by: H. M. Walker
- Produced by: Hal Roach
- Starring: Harold Lloyd
- Cinematography: Walter Lundin
- Distributed by: Pathé Exchange
- Release date: August 17, 1919
- Running time: 8 minutes
- Country: United States
- Language: Silent with English intertitles

Chop Suey & Co. is a 1919 American silent comedy short film featuring Harold Lloyd. A print of Chop Suey & Co. exists.

== Cast ==
- Harold Lloyd as The Boy
- Snub Pollard
- Bebe Daniels
- Sammy Brooks
- Lige Conley (as Lige Cromley)
- Wallace Howe
- Bud Jamison
- Dee Lampton
- Marie Mosquini
- Fred C. Newmeyer
- James Parrott
- Noah Young

== See also ==
- List of American films of 1919
