= I'm on My Way (film) =

1919 film

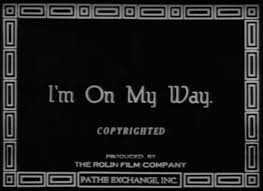
- Produced by: Hal Roach
- Starring: Harold Lloyd
- Distributed by: Pathé Exchange
- Release date: March 9, 1919
- Running time: 15 minutes
- Country: United States
- Languages: Silent; English intertitles

I'm on My Way is a 1919 American silent comedy short film featuring Harold Lloyd. A print of the film survives in the film archive of the Museum of Modern Art in New York City.

== Cast ==
- Harold Lloyd as The Boy
- Snub Pollard
- Bebe Daniels
- Sammy Brooks (uncredited)
- William Gillespie (uncredited)
- Lew Harvey (uncredited)
- Bud Jamison (uncredited)
- Dee Lampton (uncredited)
- James Morrison (uncredited)
- Marie Mosquini (uncredited)
- James Parrott (uncredited)
- Dorothea Wolbert (uncredited)

== Synopsis ==
It is The Boy's wedding day. Clad in formal attire, he meets his impatient and domineering bride-to-be outside a bridal shop. She is annoyed because The Boy is about a minute late. She buys an enormous amount of last-minute items which The Boy has great difficulty carrying back to her home. A neighbor of his fiancee invites The Boy to his abode to see his large family. The Boy is appalled at how rowdy the family is. Eventually The Boy escapes out a window and informs his fiancee that he has been cured of ever wanting to be a married man.
