= Wanted – $5,000 =

1919 film

Wanted - $5,000
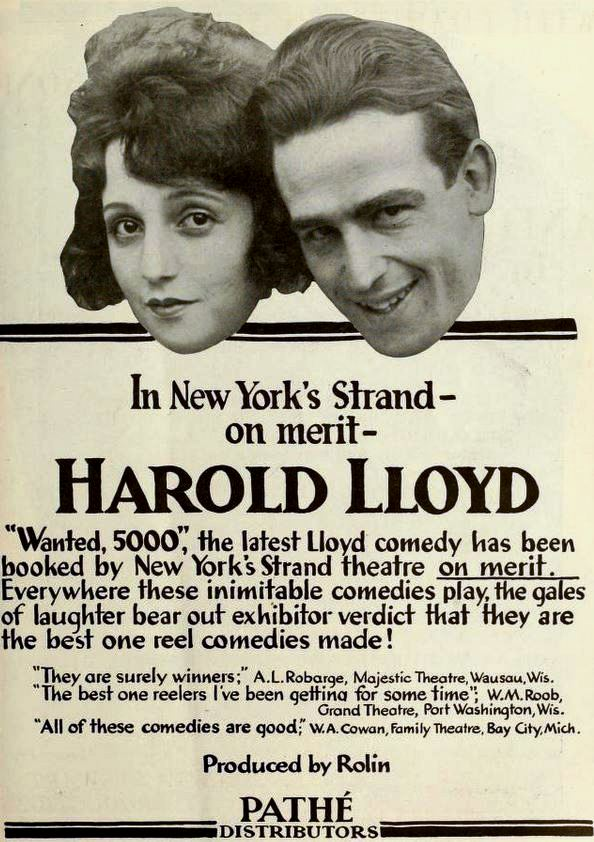
- Ad for film with Harold Lloyd and Bebe Daniels
- Directed by: Gilbert Pratt
- Produced by: Hal Roach
- Starring: Harold Lloyd
- Production company: Rolin Films
- Distributed by: Pathé Distributors
- Release date: January 12, 1919
- Country: United States
- Language: Silent (English intertitles)

Wanted – $5,000 is a 1919 American short comedy film featuring Harold Lloyd. This film is presumed lost.

== Cast ==
- Harold Lloyd
- Bebe Daniels
- Sammy Brooks
- William Gillespie
- Lew Harvey
- Bud Jamison
- Margaret Joslin
- Dee Lampton
- Marie Mosquini
- James Parrott
- Snub Pollard
- Noah Young

== See also ==
- Harold Lloyd filmography
