= Lonesome Luke, Plumber =

1917 film

- Directed by: Hal Roach
- Produced by: Hal Roach
- Starring: Harold Lloyd
- Release date: June 17, 1917
- Country: United States
- Languages: Silent film English intertitles

Lonesome Luke, Plumber is a 1917 American short comedy film starring Harold Lloyd.

== Cast ==
- Harold Lloyd as Lonesome Luke
- Snub Pollard
- Bebe Daniels
- Bud Jamison
- Gilbert Pratt
- Max Hamburger
- Arthur Harrison
- Sammy Brooks
- W.L. Adams
- David Voorhees
- Clara Lucas
- Pearl Novci
- Gus Leonard

== See also ==
- Harold Lloyd filmography
