= Swat the Crook =

1919 film

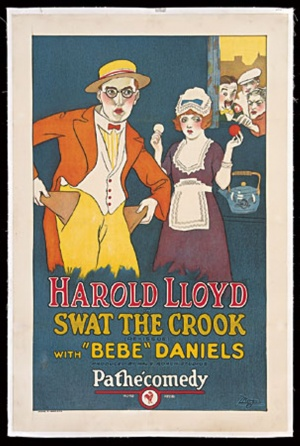
- Film poster
- Directed by: Hal Roach
- Produced by: Hal Roach
- Starring: Harold Lloyd
- Production company: Rolin Films
- Distributed by: Pathé Exchange
- Release date: June 15, 1919
- Running time: 10 minutes
- Country: United States
- Language: Silent (English intertitles)

Swat the Crook is a 1919 American silent comedy short film featuring Harold Lloyd. A print of the film exists.

== Cast ==
- Harold Lloyd as Harold
- Snub Pollard
- Bebe Daniels
- Sammy Brooks
- Billy Fay
- Lew Harvey
- Dee Lampton
- Gus Leonard
- Marie Mosquini
- Fred C. Newmeyer
- James Parrott
- Dorothea Wolbert
- Noah Young

== See also ==
- Harold Lloyd filmography
