= Fred C. Newmeyer =

American actor (1888–1967)

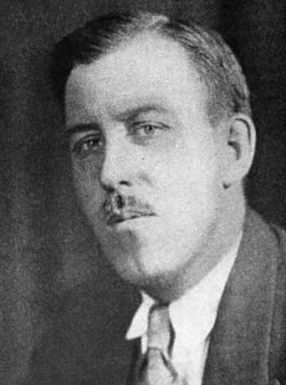
- Portrait in The Moving Picture World, February 1927
- Born: August 9, 1888; Central City, Colorado, U.S.
- Died: April 24, 1967 (aged 78); Woodland Hills, California, U.S.
- Occupation(s): Actor, film director, film producer

Fred C. Newmeyer (Note: Newmeyer's draft registration card of June 1917, which he signed, lists his name as "Fred R. Newmeyer". He also is listed with a middle initial of "R" in the 1930 United States census.) (August 9, 1888 – April 24, 1967) was an American actor, film director and film producer.

== Biography ==
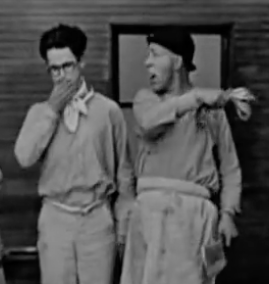
Newmeyer (at right) with Harold Lloyd in the 1919 short film Captain Kidd's Kids

A native of Central City, Colorado, Newmeyer is best known for directing a handful of films in the Our Gang series and for directing several Harold Lloyd movies, eight of them being features. With Sam Taylor, Newmeyer co-directed Lloyd in films including Safety Last! (1923), Girl Shy (1924), and The Freshman (1925). Newmeyer also had an extensive directing and acting resume in other comedy short films. He appeared as an actor in 71 films between 1914 and 1923.

Prior to his film career, Newmeyer played professional baseball. Partial statistics exist for his time as a left-handed pitcher in Minor League Baseball at the Class D level from 1911 to 1913 in the Southwest Texas League, Michigan State League, and Central Association. He made at least 66 appearances and was the winning pitcher of at least 26 games.

Newmeyer was the original director of the first short in the Our Gang series, also titled Our Gang; his version tested poorly, and producer Hal Roach scrapped most of the footage and remade the short with Robert McGowan as the director. Newmeyer, after directing numerous other shorts at Roach, returned to the Our Gang series in 1936 to direct The Pinch Singer, Arbor Day, Mail and Female and the feature film General Spanky.

Newmeyer and his wife, Berna, had a son, Fred W. After his film career, Newmeyer worked with the athletic department of University High School in Los Angeles. Newmeyer died on April 24, 1967, in Woodland Hills, California, at the age of 78.

== Selected filmography ==
Year	Title
1916 (all as actor)	Luke's Shattered Sleep; Luke Locates the Loot; Luke's Fireworks Fizzle; Luke, Rank Impersonator; Luke's Movie Muddle; Luke's Newsie Knockout; Luke, Patient Provider; Luke, the Gladiator; Luke's Preparedness Preparations; Luke, the Chauffeur; Luke and the Bang-Tails; Luke's Speedy Club Life; Luke and the Mermaids; Luke Joins the Navy; Luke Does the Midway; Luke's Lost Lamb; Luke, Crystal Gazer; Luke Rides Roughshod; Luke's Society Mixup; Luke's Late Lunchers; Luke, the Candy Cut-Up

Year	Title
1917	The Big Idea; Step Lively; Bashful; Move On; We Never Sleep; All Aboard; Clubs Are Trump; Love, Laughs and Lather; Rainbow Island; From Laramie to London; Birds of a Feather; By the Sad Sea Waves; Pinched; Lonesome Luke Loses Patients; Over the Fence; Lonesome Luke's Wild Women; Lonesome Luke, Messenger; Lonesome Luke on Tin Can Alley

Year	Title
1918	Two-Gun Gussie; It's a Wild Life; Pipe the Whiskers; The Tip

Year	Title
1919	From Hand to Mouth; Captain Kidd's Kids; Bumping Into Broadway; His Only Father; Pay Your Dues; Count the Votes; Soft Money; He Leads, Others Follow; The Rajah; Be My Wife; Don't Shove; Heap Big Chief; Chop Suey & Co.; Count Your Change; Spring Fever; Off the Trolley; Swat the Crook; Pistols for Breakfast; The Marathon; Si, Senor; Ring Up the Curtain; Crack Your Heels; Young Mr. Jazz; A Sammy in Siberia; On the Fire

Year	Title
1920	Number, Please?

Year	Title
1921	A Sailor-Made Man

Year	Title
1922	Doctor Jack

Year	Title
1923	Safety Last!; Why Worry?

Year	Title
1924	Girl Shy

Year	Title
1925	The Perfect Clown; The Freshman

Year	Title
1927	On Your Toes

Year	Title
1928	Warming Up

Year	Title
1929	It Can Be Done

Year	Title
1930	Queen High; The Grand Parade

Year	Title
1931	Subway Express

Year	Title
1932	The Gambling Sex; The Fighting Gentleman

Year	Title
1933	Easy Millions

Year	Title
1934	No Ransom

Year	Title
1935	Secrets of Chinatown

Year	Title
1936	The Pinch Singer; Arbor Day

Year	Title
1937	Mail and Female
