= Marie Mosquini =

American actress (1899–1983)

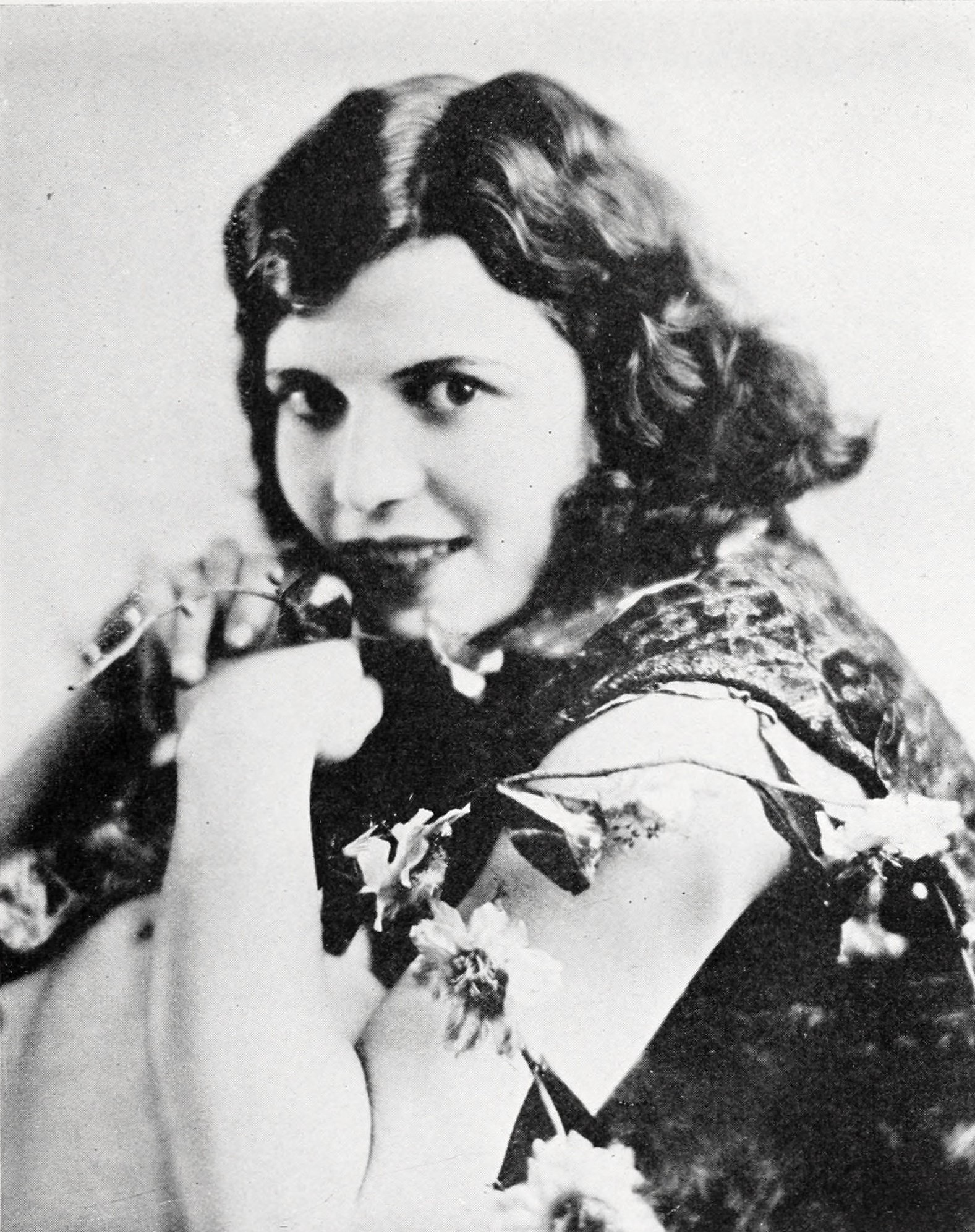
- Who's Who on the Screen, 1920
- Born: Marie de Esy; December 3, 1899; Los Angeles, California, U.S.
- Died: February 21, 1983 (aged 83); Los Angeles, California, U.S.
- Other name: Marie De Forest
- Years active: 1917–1929
- Spouse(s): Roy Harlow (div. 1930) Lee de Forest (m. 1930; died 1961)

Marie Mosquini (born Marie de Esy; December 3, 1899 – February 21, 1983) was an American film actress.

== Biography ==
Born in 1899, Mosquini appeared in more than 200 silent films between 1917 and 1929. After leaving high school she became the resident ingenue at the Hal Roach studio, appearing opposite Roach's comedy stars Harold Lloyd, Snub Pollard, and Stan Laurel.

In 1919, Roach formed a company headed by Pollard, with Mosquini as leading lady. They later became engaged. Mosquini was married to Roy Harlow, and they had one child who died at birth. In a two-year span, Harlow sued Mosquini twice for divorce. The first case was dismissed, and they reconciled. The second suit brought a cross-complaint from Mosquini, and the Los Angeles Times reported on December 31, 1925, that Mosquini "will receive a divorce decree today". He also sued Mosquini's mother for alienation of his wife's affections.

After obtaining a divorce from Harlow in October 1930, Mosquini retired from acting and married an inventor 26 years her senior: Lee de Forest. She became his fourth and longest-lasting wife, staying with him until his death in 1961. In 1967, Mosquini donated her husband's papers and historic prototypes to the Perham Foundation, now held at History San Jose. In 1968, she became a Novice Class amateur radio operator; her call sign was WB6ZJR. In 1973, she participated in a radio broadcast celebrating the centennial of her husband's birth.

She was born and died in Los Angeles, California.

== Selected filmography ==
- Lonesome Luke on Tin Can Alley (1917, Short)
- Stop! Luke! Listen! (1917, Short)
- Lonesome Luke, Mechanic (1917, Short)
- Lonesome Luke's Wild Women (1917, Short)
- Lonesome Luke Loses Patients (1917, Short)
- From Laramie to London (1917, Short)
- Love, Laughs and Lather (1917, Short)
- All Aboard (1917, Short)
- We Never Sleep (1917, Short)
- The Tip (1918, Short)
- No Place Like Jail (1918, Short)
- Just Rambling Along (1918, Short)
- That's Him (1918, Short)
- She Loves Me Not (1918, Short)
- Do You Love Your Wife? (1919, Short) – The Vampire
- Wanted – $5,000 (1919, Short)
- Going! Going! Gone! (1919, Short)
- Hustling for Health (1919, Short) – Homeowner's wife (uncredited)
- On the Fire (1919, Short)
- Hoots Mon! (1919, Short)
- I'm on My Way (1919, Short) – (uncredited)
- Look Out Below (1919, Short)
- A Sammy in Siberia (1919, Short) – (uncredited)
- Young Mr. Jazz (1919, Short) – Vamp Pickpocket (uncredited)
- Crack Your Heels (1919, Short)
- Ring Up the Curtain (1919, Short) – Actress (uncredited)
- Si, Senor (1919, Short)
- The Marathon (1919, Short) – The Waitress (uncredited)
- Swat the Crook (1919, Short)
- Off the Trolley (1919, Short)
- Just Neighbors (1919, Short) – Maid (uncredited)
- A Jazzed Honeymoon (1919, Short)
- Count Your Change (1919, Short)
- Chop Suey & Co. (1919, Short)
- Heap Big Chief (1919, Short)
- Don't Shove (1919, Short)
- Be My Wife (1919, Short)
- The Rajah (1919, Short)
- He Leads, Others Follow (1919, Short)
- Soft Money (1919, Short)
- Count the Votes (1919, Short)
- Pay Your Dues (1919, Short)
- His Only Father (1919, Short)
- Captain Kidd's Kids (1919, Short) – Pirate Girl (uncredited)
- From Hand to Mouth (1919, Short) – Maid (uncredited)
- All Lit Up (1920, Short) – The Girl
- His Royal Slyness (1920, Short) – Verona Vermuth (uncredited)
- Safety Last! (1923) – Salesgirl (uncredited)
- Short Orders (1923, Short) – Cashier
- It's a Gift (1923, Short) – The Girl
- Save the Ship (1923, Short) – Wife
- Good and Naughty (1926) – Chouchou Rouselle
- 7th Heaven (1927) – Madame Gobin
- Two Girls Wanted (1927) – Sarah Miller (uncredited)
- Do Your Duty (1928)
- The Black Book (1929, Serial) – Sally
- Turn Off the Moon (1937) – Elevator Operator (uncredited)
- Mountain Music (1937) – Show Girl (uncredited)
- Tropic Holiday (1938) – Chorus Girl (uncredited)
- Trade Winds (1938) – Hawaiian Hairdresser (uncredited)
