= A Small Town Idol =

1921 film

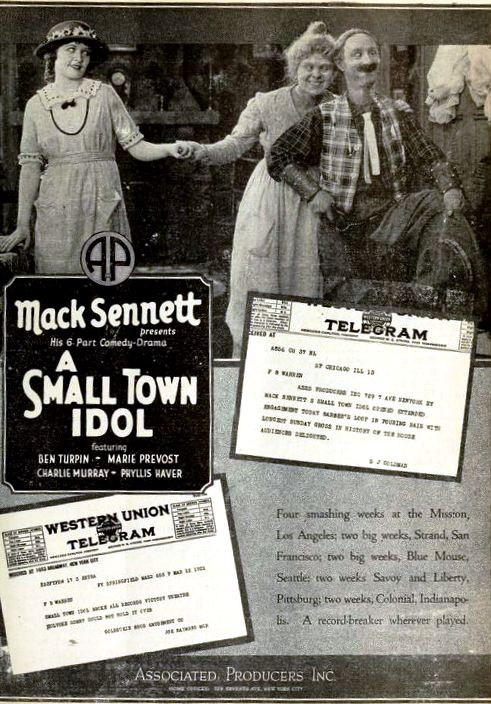
- Advertisement with Phyllis Haver, Dot Farley, and Ben Turpin
- Directed by: Mack Sennett; Erle C. Kenton
- Produced by: Mack Sennett
- Cinematography: Ernie Crocket; Perry Evans; J. R. Lockwood
- Edited by: Allen McNeil
- Production company: Associated Producers
- Distributed by: Associated First National; Warner Bros. Pictures, Inc. (re-release)
- Release date: February 13, 1921
- Running time: 70 minutes; 7 reels
- Country: United States
- Language: Silent (English intertitles)

A Small Town Idol is a 1921 American silent feature comedy film produced by Mack Sennett and released through Associated First National. The film stars Ben Turpin and was made and acted by many of the same Sennett personnel from his previous year's Down on the Farm. Sennett and Erle C. Kenton directed.

The picture was Sennett's biggest undertaking to date, costing $350,000 and required over a year to make.

== Plot ==
Sam (Turpin) leaves town after being falsely accused of a crime and becomes a film star in Hollywood working with actress Marcelle Mansfield (Prevost). He returns to his home town hailed as a hero where one of his films is shown in the theater. His rival Jones (Finlayson), who wants Sam's girlfriend Mary (Haver), frames Sam for the shooting of Mary's father. Just as the townspeople are about to lynch Sam, Mary arrives to prove Sam's innocence and the two are reconciled.

== Cast ==
- Ben Turpin as Sam Smith
- James Finlayson as J. Wellington Jones
- Phyllis Haver as Mary Brown
- Bert Roach - Martin Brown
- Al Cooke as Joe Barnum
- Charles Murray as Sheriff Sparks (credited as Charlie Murray)
- Marie Prevost as Marcelle Mansfield
- Dot Farley as Mrs. Smith
- Eddie Gribbon as Bandit Chief
- Kalla Pasha as Bandie Chief's Rival
- Billy Bevan as Director
- George O'Hara as Cameraman
- John J. Richardson as Screen Villain (credited as Jack Richardson)
- Louise Fazenda as Theatregoer
- Lige Conley as Minister (credited as Lige Crommie)

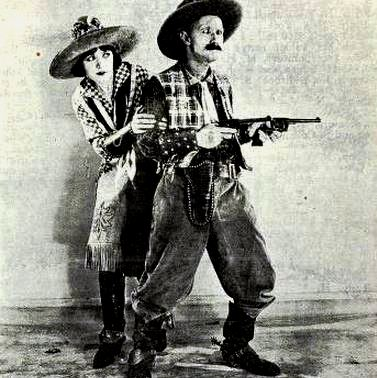
Prevost and Turpin star in the western being shown in the town's theater

uncredited performers

- Heinie Conklin as Jester in movie
- Ramon Novarro as Dancer (credited as Ramon Samaniegos)
- Jane Allen as Minor Role
- Andy Clyde as Minor Role
- Harry Gribbon as Minor Role
- Floy Guinn as Minor Role
- Mack L. Hamilton as Minor Role
- Harriet Hammond as Minor Role
- Mildred June as Minor Role
- Fanny Kelly as Minor Role
- Marvin Loback as Minor Role
- Don Marion as Minor Role
- Kewpie Morgan as Minor Role
- Derelys Perdue as Dancer
- Gladys Whitfield as Minor Role

== Notes ==
- This was Ramon Novarro's seventh film, where he was billed as Ramon Samaniegos.
- Copies of the film exist in archives, such as Gosfilmofond.
- In 1933 Mack Sennett cut the feature down to two reels, adding music, sound effects, narration, and a new title sequence with the credits printed in a book with portraits of the actors. Warner Bros. reissued the condensed Sennett version in 1939 as one of its "Broadway Brevities." The Telefeatures TV syndication firm reprinted it in 1960 as part of the "Nickelodeon Theatre" series, with new narration by Jim Backus.
