= Luke Rides Roughshod =

1916 film by Hal Roach

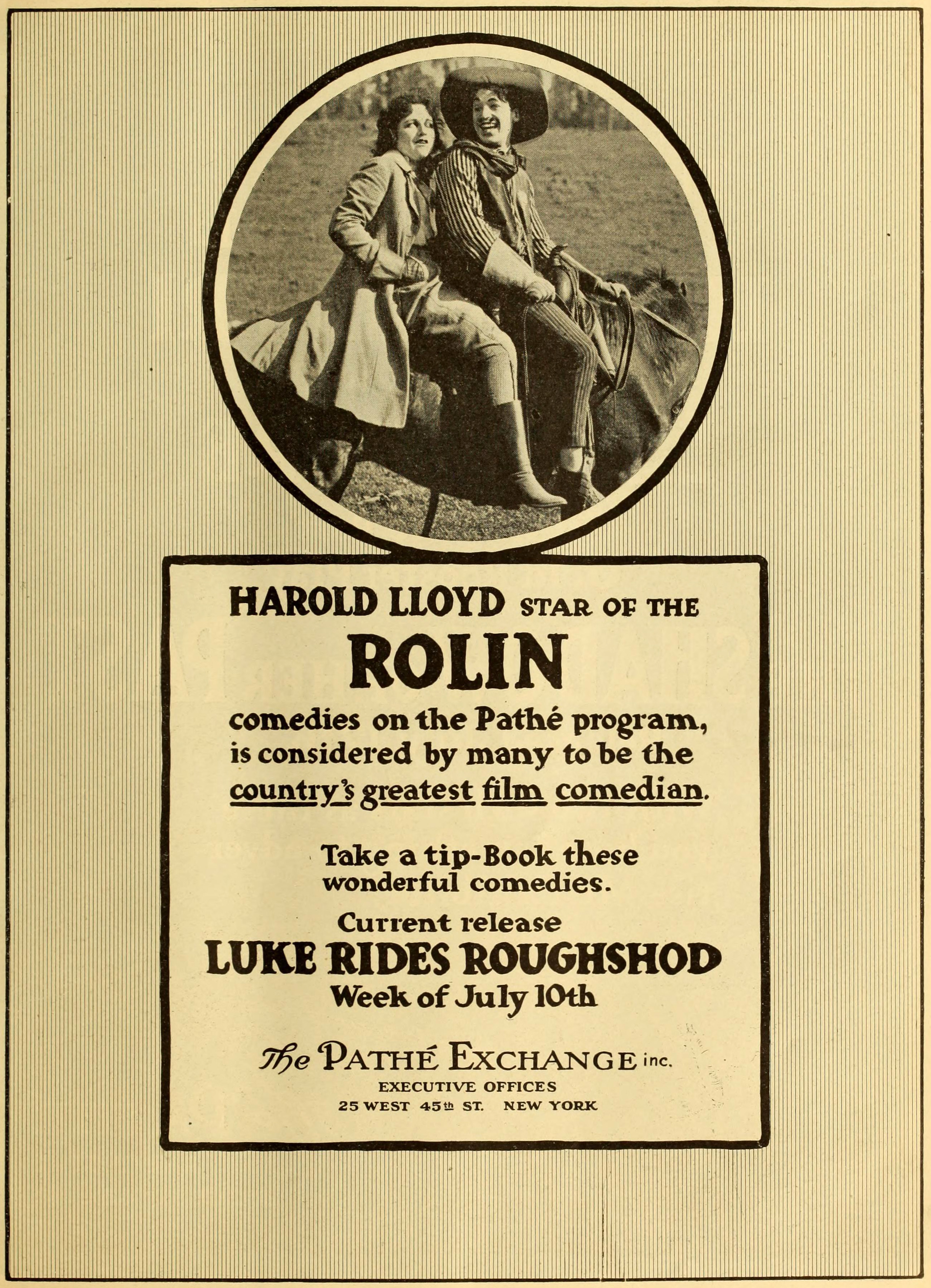
- Film poster
- Directed by: Hal Roach
- Produced by: Hal Roach
- Starring: Harold Lloyd
- Distributed by: Pathé Exchange
- Release date: July 10, 1916
- Country: United States
- Languages: Silent; English intertitles

Luke Rides Roughshod is a 1916 American short comedy film featuring Harold Lloyd.

== Cast ==
- Harold Lloyd as Lonesome Luke
- Snub Pollard (as Harry Pollard)
- Bebe Daniels
- Billy Fay
- Fred C. Newmeyer
- A.H. Frahlich
- Sammy Brooks
- Eva Thatcher (as Evelyn Thatcher)
- Rose Mendel
- Ben Corday
- Dee Lampton
- C.A. Self
- L.A. Gregor
- Ray Wyatt
- C. Spikeman
- Minna Browne
- F. Ward
- L. McCormack
- H. Minneshaw
- Clifford Silsby
- H. Granger
- Charles Stevenson (as Charles E. Stevenson)

== See also ==
- Harold Lloyd filmography
