= Luke, Crystal Gazer =

1916 film by Hal Roach

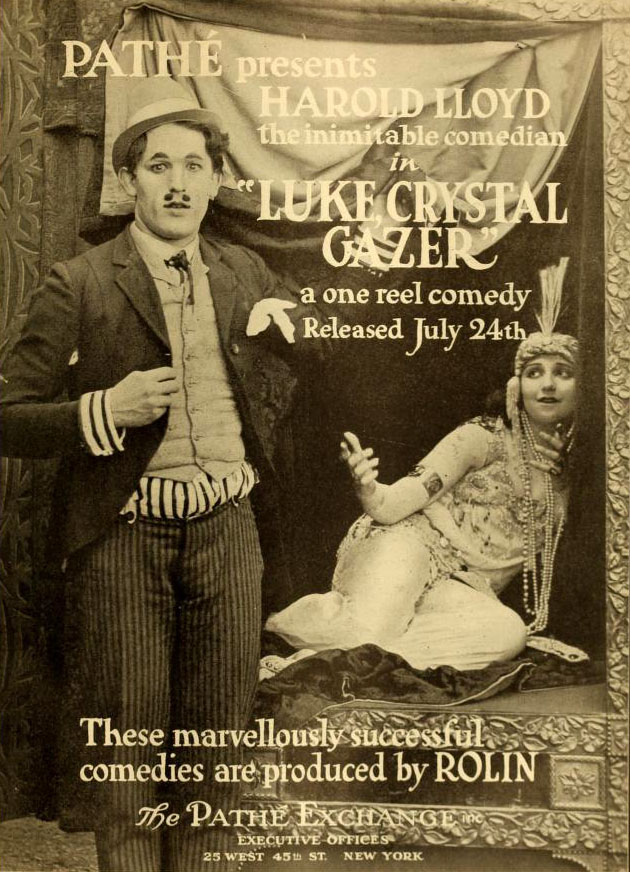
- Directed by: Hal Roach
- Produced by: Hal Roach
- Starring: Harold Lloyd
- Distributed by: Pathé Exchange
- Release date: July 24, 1916
- Country: United States
- Language: Silent with English intertitles

Luke, Crystal Gazer is a 1916 American short comedy film starring Harold Lloyd. A print exists.

== Cast ==
- Harold Lloyd as Lonesome Luke
- Snub Pollard as (as Harry Pollard)
- Bebe Daniels
- Charles Stevenson (as Charles E. Stevenson)
- Billy Fay
- Fred C. Newmeyer
- A.H. Frahlich
- Sammy Brooks
- Eva Thatcher (as Evelyn Thatcher)
- Rose Mendel
- Ben Corday
- Dee Lampton
- C.A. Self
- L.A. Gregor
- Ray Wyatt
- C. Spikeman
- Winna Browne
- Lionel Comport
- Harry Todd
- Bud Jamison
- May Cloy
- Della Mullady

== See also ==
- Harold Lloyd filmography
