= Matrimony Blues =

1926 film

- Directed by: Benjamin Stoloff
- Starring: Lige Conley; Mildred June; Spencer Bell
- Release date: 1926
- Country: United States
- Languages: Silent film English intertitles

Matrimony Blues was a 1926 short comedy silent film directed by Philadelphian director, Benjamin Stoloff. The film starred Lige Conley, Mildred June, and Spencer Bell.
