= Ladies to Board =

1924 film by John G. Blystone

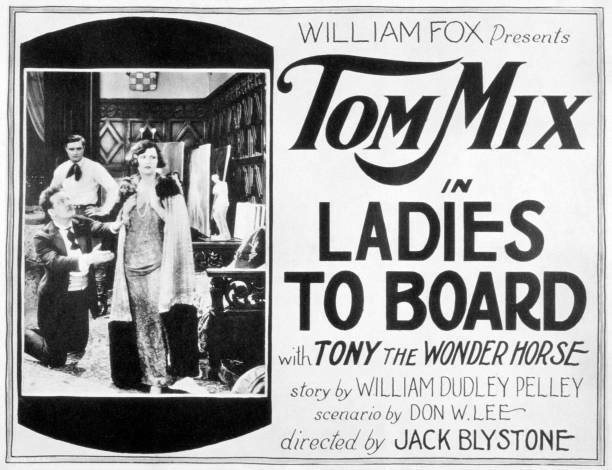
- Directed by: John G. Blystone
- Screenplay by: Donald W. Lee
- Story by: William Dudley Pelley
- Starring: Tom Mix; Gertrude Olmstead; Philo McCullough; Gilbert Holmes; Gertrude Claire; Dolores Rousse
- Cinematography: Daniel B. Clark
- Production company: Fox Film Corporation
- Distributed by: Fox Film Corporation
- Release date: February 3, 1924
- Running time: 60 minutes
- Country: United States
- Language: Silent (English intertitles)

Ladies to Board is a 1924 American silent comedy film directed by John G. Blystone and written by Donald W. Lee. The film stars Tom Mix, Gertrude Olmstead, Philo McCullough, Gilbert Holmes, Gertrude Claire, and Dolores Rousse. The film was released on February 3, 1924, by Fox Film Corporation.

== Plot ==
As described in a review in a film magazine, a crabbed, elderly lady on a motor trip through the west loses control of her car on a steep hill and Tom Faxon, a native, heroically rescues her. A few years after she dies, leaving her estate, consisting of a sanitarium for old ladies, to Tom. He immediately goes east, taking his chum Bunk with him. Tom gets to be very popular with the old ladies and is especially attracted to a charming nurse, Edith, and to Mrs. Carmichael, whose son, a successful artist, has neglected her. Tom makes it his business to go and bring the son to the home; he has to use rough methods, but he succeeds. Tom also by using cave-man stuff elopes with the pretty nurse, while Buck elopes with the housekeeper.

== Cast ==
- Tom Mix as Tom Faxton
- Gertrude Olmstead as Edith Oliver
- Philo McCullough as Evan Carmichael
- Gilbert Holmes as Bunk McGinnis
- Gertrude Claire as Mrs. Carmichael
- Dolores Rousse as Model
- Tony the Horse
- Walter Wilkinson

== Preservation ==
With no prints of Ladies to Board located in any film archives, it is a lost film.
