= Mildred June =

American actress (1905–1940)

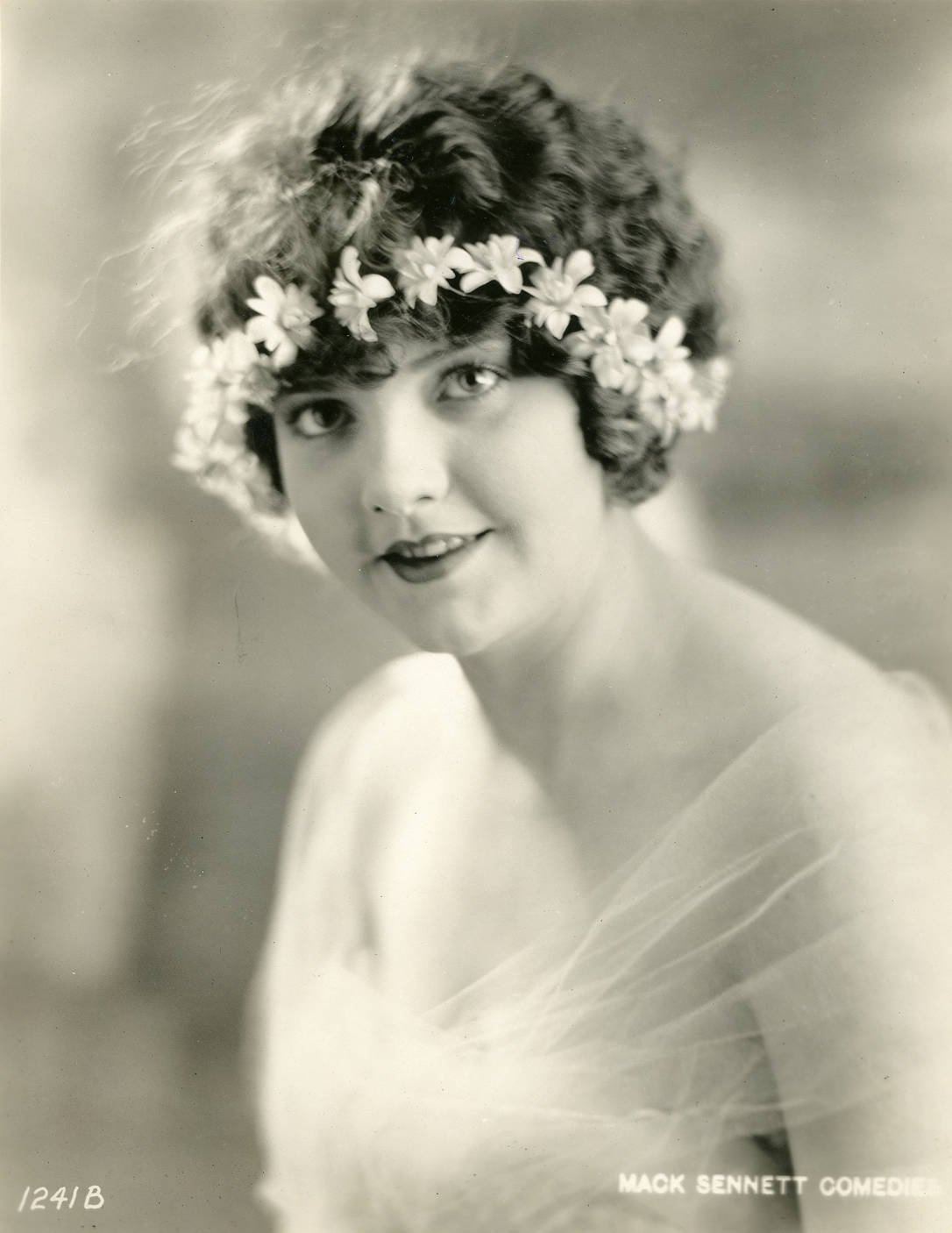
- June in 1922
- Born: December 23, 1905; St. Louis, Missouri, U.S.
- Died: June 19, 1940 (aged 34); Hollywood, California, U.S.
- Resting place: Hollywood Forever Cemetery
- Occupation: Actress
- Years active: 1919–1936
- Spouses: Herbert Edward Capps (m. 1922; div. 1925) Bud Sheehan (m. 1930; died 1935)

Mildred June (December 23, 1905 – June 19, 1940) was an American actress who appeared in silent films. She was also co-writer of a 1927 film. She died at the age of 34 from alcoholism.

== Life ==
June was born in St. Louis in 1905.

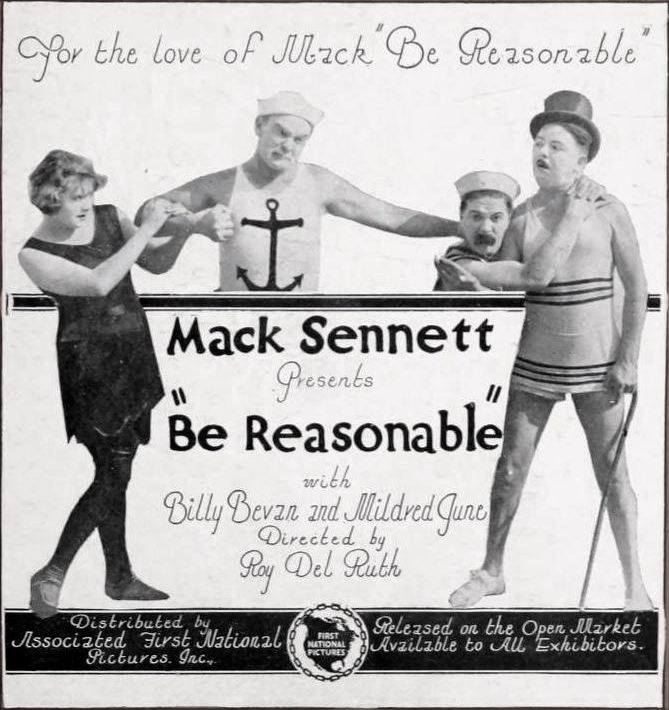
The 1921 comedy Be Reasonable

She was an American actress appearing in silent films. June starred in Troubles of a Bride in 1924 with Robert Agnew and Alan Hale. and in the similarly themed Matrimony Blues in 1926 with Lige Conley. The following year she starred in The Snarl of Hate and she was co-writer of the 1927 film Crazy to Act, in which she and Oliver Hardy starred.

Her last part in a film was a small one in Our Relations which starred Laurel and Hardy in 1936.

She died young from alcoholism in Hollywood in 1940 from cirrhosis of the liver.

== Selected filmography ==
- Down on the Farm (1920)
- Molly O (1921)
- A Small Town Idol (1921)
- Rich Men's Wives (1922)
- The Rosary (1922)
- The Crossroads of New York (1922)
- Crinoline and Romance (1923)
- Fashionable Fakers (1923)
- The Greatest Menace (1923)
- Troubles of a Bride (1924)
- The Battling Kangaroo (1926)
- The Snarl of Hate (1927)
