= Ben Turpin =

American actor (1869–1940)

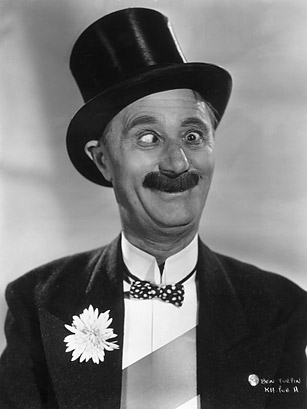
- Ben Turpin, 1935
- Born: Bernard Turpin; September 19, 1869; New Orleans, Louisiana, U.S.
- Died: July 1, 1940 (aged 70); Santa Monica, California, U.S.
- Resting place: Forest Lawn Memorial Park, Glendale, California
- Spouse(s): Norma Koch (m. 1898; died 1904) Carrie Lemieux (m. 1907; died 1925) Babette Dietz (m. 1926)

Comedy career
- Years active: 1907–1940
- Medium: Comedian; actor
- Genre: Silent films

Bernard "Ben" Turpin (September 19, 1869 – July 1, 1940) was an American comedian and actor, best remembered for his work in silent films. His trademarks were his cross-eyed appearance and adeptness at vigorous physical comedy. A sometime vaudeville performer, he was "discovered" for film while working as the janitor for Essanay Studios in Chicago. Turpin went on to work with notable performers such as Charlie Chaplin, W.C Fields, Wheeler and Woolsey, and Laurel and Hardy. He also became a part of the Mack Sennett studio team. He is believed to have been the first filmed "victim" of the pie in the face gag, in "Mr Flip"(1909). When sound came to films in 1929, Turpin, who had invested profitably in real estate, chose to retire, although he continued to make occasional cameo appearances.

== Personal life ==
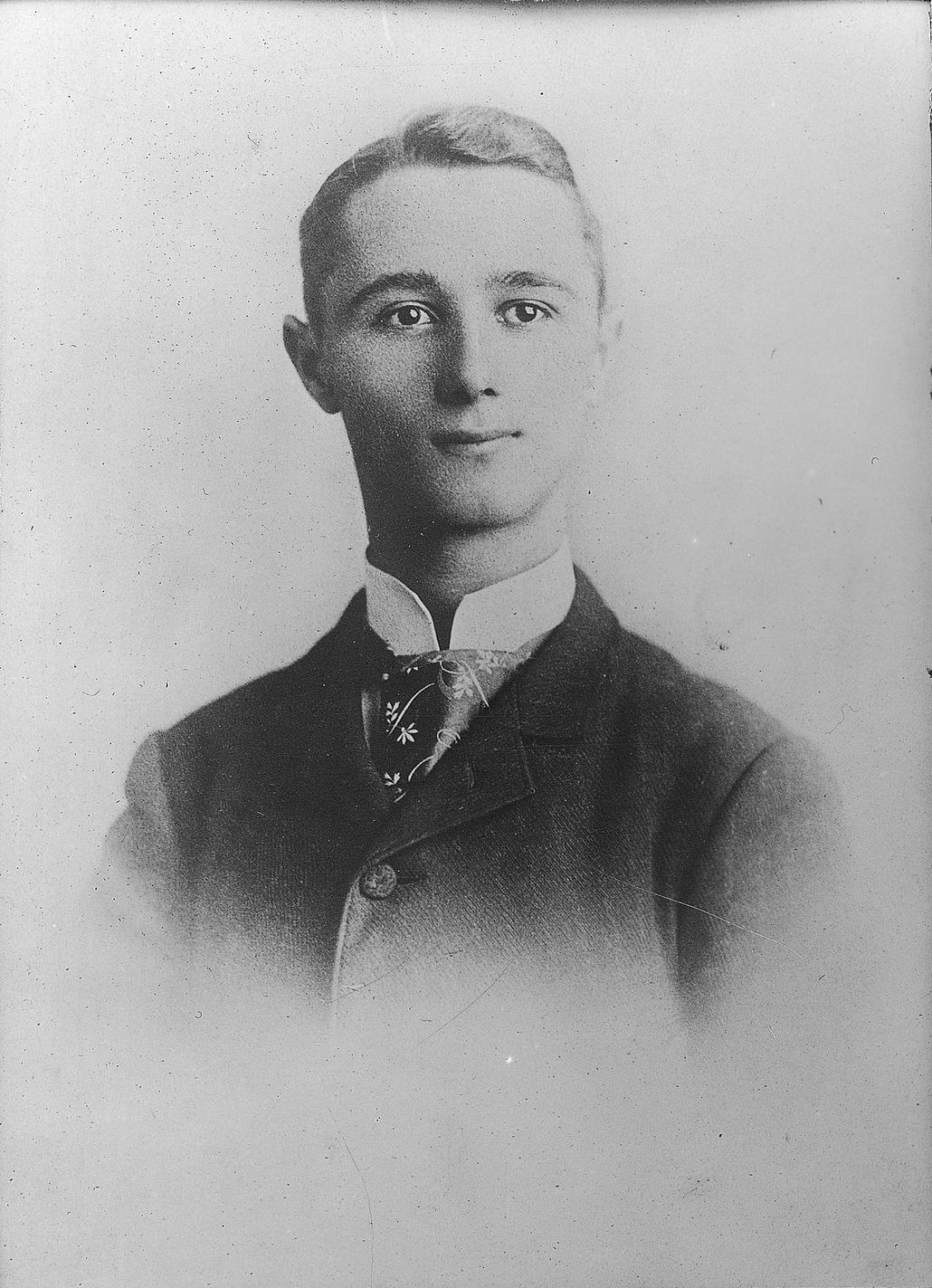
Ben Turpin in 1891

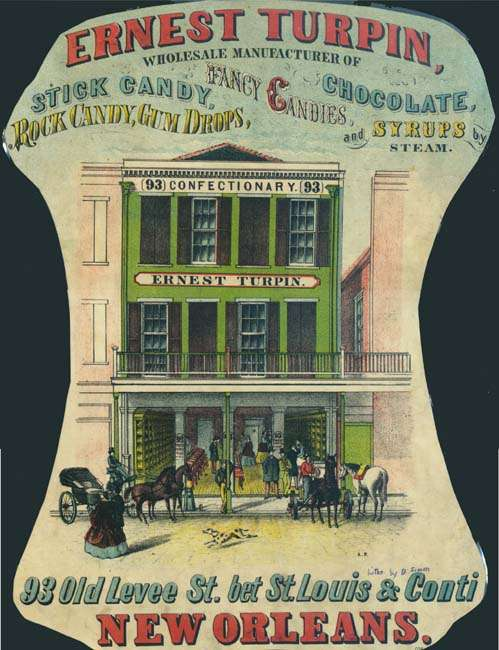
Late 1800s ad for Ernest Turpin Candy Store, where Ben worked in his childhood

Ben Turpin was born in New Orleans, Louisiana, on September 19, 1869, on St. Charles Avenue. His father, Ernest Turpin, was of French descent and owned the city's largest candy store. His mother was Sarah, nee Buckley. Ben was second of their three children, followed by his sister Octavia, born February, 1871. Their earlier years were spent in the French Quarter. Ben was named after his grandfather, Bernard Turpin, a famous auctioneer. During his childhood Turpin worked in his father's store, juggling and making customers happy.

When Turpin was an older teenager, his father gave him one hundred dollars and told him to start out for himself, but he lost it gambling next day and, afraid to go home, went to Chicago. Turpin had an extremely restless spirit; he voluntarily became a hobo as a young man, choosing to ride boxcars in preference to finding a job. He did this for several years.

In the late 1890s, after employment in a succession of menial jobs, Ben started playing in vaudeville before being signed by Essanay studios. On stage, Turpin was an impersonator, juggler, dancer, equilibrist and acrobat. He played the character "Happy Hooligan" for seventeen successful years on the vaudeville stage. After playing the cross-eyed "Happy Hooligan" several times a day, his right eye became stuck in a crossed position as a result of the repeated strain.

On February 24, 1898, Ben married Norma Koch in her hometown of Cincinnati, Ohio. The marriage was an unhappy one, lasting until Norma's death in 1904 at age 25.

Three years later, Turpin met young actress Carrie Lemieux; they were married in Chicago on February 18, 1907.The couple appeared together on the stage and in short films.

In 1923, Carrie Turpin became ill with influenza, which caused the loss of her hearing. Heartbroken, Turpin took his seriously ill wife to the Basilica of Sainte-Anne-de-Beaupré in Quebec, hoping she would be healed. She eventually became an invalid, and Turpin placed his career on hold to care for her. Carrie died on October 2, 1925.

Nine months after Carrie's tragic passing, in Los Angeles, on July 8, 1926, the 56-year-old Turpin married 39-year-old Babette Elizabeth Dietz, a German immigrant who had spent much of her life in New Salem and Bismarck.

Babette reportedly entered Turpin's life as Carrie's nurse, although some newspapers later reported that she met Turpin while nursing him during a hospital stay in Santa Barbara. After Carrie died in 1925, Ben and Babette married the following summer.

They were married for fourteen years until Ben's death in 1940. The couple had no children. They lived in Santa Monica, California.

Turpin was a Roman Catholic, and a member of the Good Shepherd Parish and the Catholic Motion Picture Guild in Beverly Hills, California.

== Vaudeville ==
Turpin worked in vaudeville, burlesque, and circuses. He had a distinctive appearance, with a small wiry frame, a brush mustache, and crossed eyes. Turpin's famous eyes, he said, only crossed as a young adult after he suffered an accident. He was convinced that the crossed eyes were essential to his comic career; his co-workers recalled that after he received any blow to the head he made a point of looking himself in the mirror to assure himself that his eyes had not become uncrossed. He was a devout Catholic, and his workmates occasionally goaded him by threatening to pray that his eyes would uncross, thus depriving him of his livelihood.

Turpin famously bought a $25,000 insurance policy with Lloyd's of London, payable if his eyes ever uncrossed. A 1920 version of the story had the amount upped to $100,000.

He developed a vigorous style of physical comedy, including an ability to stage comic pratfalls that impressed even his fellows in the rough-and-tumble world of silent comedy. One of his specialties was a forward tumble he called the "hundred an' eight". It was basically an interrupted forward somersault initiated by kicking one leg up, turning over 180 degrees to land flat on the back or in a seated position.

== Film ==
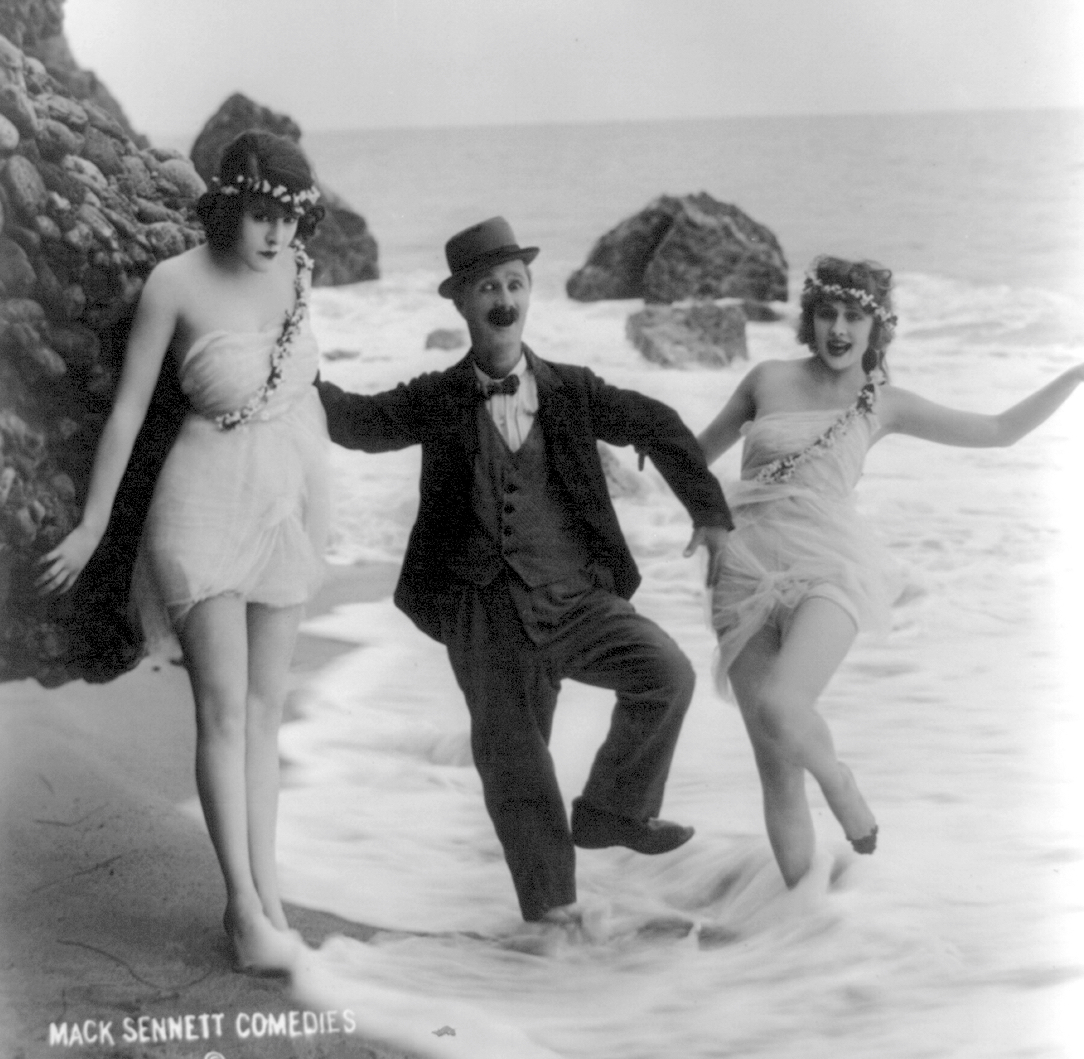
Ben Turpin with two of the Sennett Bathing Beauties

Turpin first appeared on film in 1907 for Essanay Studios in Chicago, in various small parts and comic bits. In addition to his on-screen work, he worked as a carpenter and janitor for Essanay. In the 1909 film Mr. Flip, Turpin receives what is believed to have been the first pie-in-the-face.

Charlie Chaplin joined the Essanay company in 1915, and the studio made Turpin his second banana. Chaplin was maturing as a filmmaker, working slowly and intuitively. Turpin, however, was impatient with Chaplin's methods. The earthy Turpin understood straightforward slapstick more than comic subtlety. The Chaplin–Turpin duo did not last long, with Chaplin abandoning Chicago for California. Turpin does share one additional credit with Chaplin: after Chaplin filmed A Burlesque on Carmen in two reels, Essanay filmed new scenes with Turpin to pad the picture into a featurette, doubling its length. These new scenes were staged by actor-director Leo White; Turpin and Chaplin do not appear together on screen.

Essanay did not survive Chaplin's departure and remained solvent for only a few more years. Turpin may have been aware of Essanay's instability; he left for the Vogue comedy company, where he starred in a series of two-reel comedies. Former Essanay comedian Paddy McGuire supported him. Many of Turpin's Vogue comedies were re-released under different titles (by the Cameo company, in 1920) to cash in on Turpin's subsequent stardom: Why Ben Bolted was retitled He Looked Crooked, for example.

== Mack Sennett and stardom ==
In 1917, Ben Turpin joined the leading comedy company, the Mack Sennett studio. Turpin's aptitude for crude slapstick suited the Sennett style perfectly, and Sennett's writers often cast the ridiculous-looking Turpin against type (a rugged Yukon miner; a suave, worldly lover; a stalwart cowboy; a fearless stuntman, etc.) for maximum comic effect. Through the 1920s his roles often spoofed serious actors and celebrities of the time – e.g., "The Shriek" for "The Sheik" – and Turpin became one of film's most popular comics. Turpin appeared in both short subjects and feature films for Sennett. Delighted with his success, he took to introducing himself with the phrase, "I'm Ben Turpin; I make $3,000 a week." He played silents with Mabel Normand, Phillys Haver, Madeline Hurlock, Charlie Chaplin, Chester Conklin, James Finlayson, Billy Bevan and others.

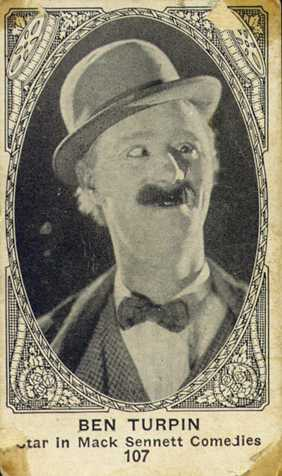
Promotional card issued by the American Caramel company in the US in 1921

Sennett terminated most of his staff's contracts in 1928, and closed the studio to retool for the new talking pictures. Turpin was signed by the low-budget Weiss Bros.-Artclass company, perhaps the most ambitious coup that Artclass ever attempted. Turpin made 10 two-reel comedies there for one year. Artclass usually traded on his peculiar vision with titles like Idle Eyes and The Eyes Have It.

== Turpin in the sound era ==
The year 1929 saw many silent-film stars uncertain about their future employment, with the new talking pictures requiring new skills and techniques. Ben Turpin chose to retire. He had invested his earnings in real estate and, being highly successful at this, had no financial need for more work. Producers soon sought him out for gag appearances in films. Turpin's speaking voice was a gritty rasp that retained elements of the New Orleans "Yat" accent of his youth. He commanded a flat fee of $1,000 per appearance, regardless of whether it was a speaking role or a fleeting cameo. Among the most memorable of these cameos were in RKO's Wheeler and Woolsey comedy Cracked Nuts (with Turpin as a cockeyed bombardier), and Paramount's Million Dollar Legs (1932), starring W. C. Fields, Jack Oakie, and Susan Fleming (the future wife of Harpo Marx of The Marx Brothers). Turpin also offered comedy relief in Mascot's 1934 adventure serial The Law of the Wild.

Turpin starred in five more film, including the short subject Keystone Hotel (Warner Bros., 1935), a reunion of silent-era comedians. His last feature film was Laurel and Hardy's Saps at Sea in 1940, in which his cross-eyed face served as a joke punchline. He was paid his $1,000 for one quick shot of his face and just 16 words of dialogue. Death prevented his scheduled appearance in Charlie Chaplin's The Great Dictator.

== Death ==
In 1940, Turpin suffered a stroke on June 23 and was treated at a hospital. After a few days, he was discharged and apparently was on the road to recovery. On June 30, he was apparently feeling fine, but later that day, complaining of chest pains, Turpin was rushed to Santa Monica Hospital. He died the following morning on July 1, of a massive heart attack. He was 70.

Two days later Turpin was interred in the Forest Lawn Memorial Park Cemetery in Glendale, California, following a Requiem Mass at the Church of the Good Shepherd in Beverly Hills. He was eulogized as "a fine member of his church, strong in his faith" by Father J. P. Concannon. His pallbearers included Andy Clyde, Billy Bevan, James Finlayson, Heinie Conklin, and Charlie Murray.

Turpin had been close friends with Andy Clyde and James Finlayson, with Clyde having been the witness at Turpin's second wedding, and Turpin having been one of the witnesses signing Finlayson's petition for naturalization.

== Turpin's crossed eyes ==
Turpin and Sennett both appeared as themselves (in Technicolor) in Hollywood Cavalcade (1939), a partly fictionalized movie about the silent-film era. This movie contains a sequence in which Turpin reports for work and prepares to go onto the set in character. In the dressing room he picks up a hand mirror and checks his reflection as he deliberately crosses his eyes as extremely as possible. In this sequence, it can be seen that Turpin's left eye was actually normal when he was not performing and that he intentionally crossed it (to match his misaligned right eye) as part of his screen character.

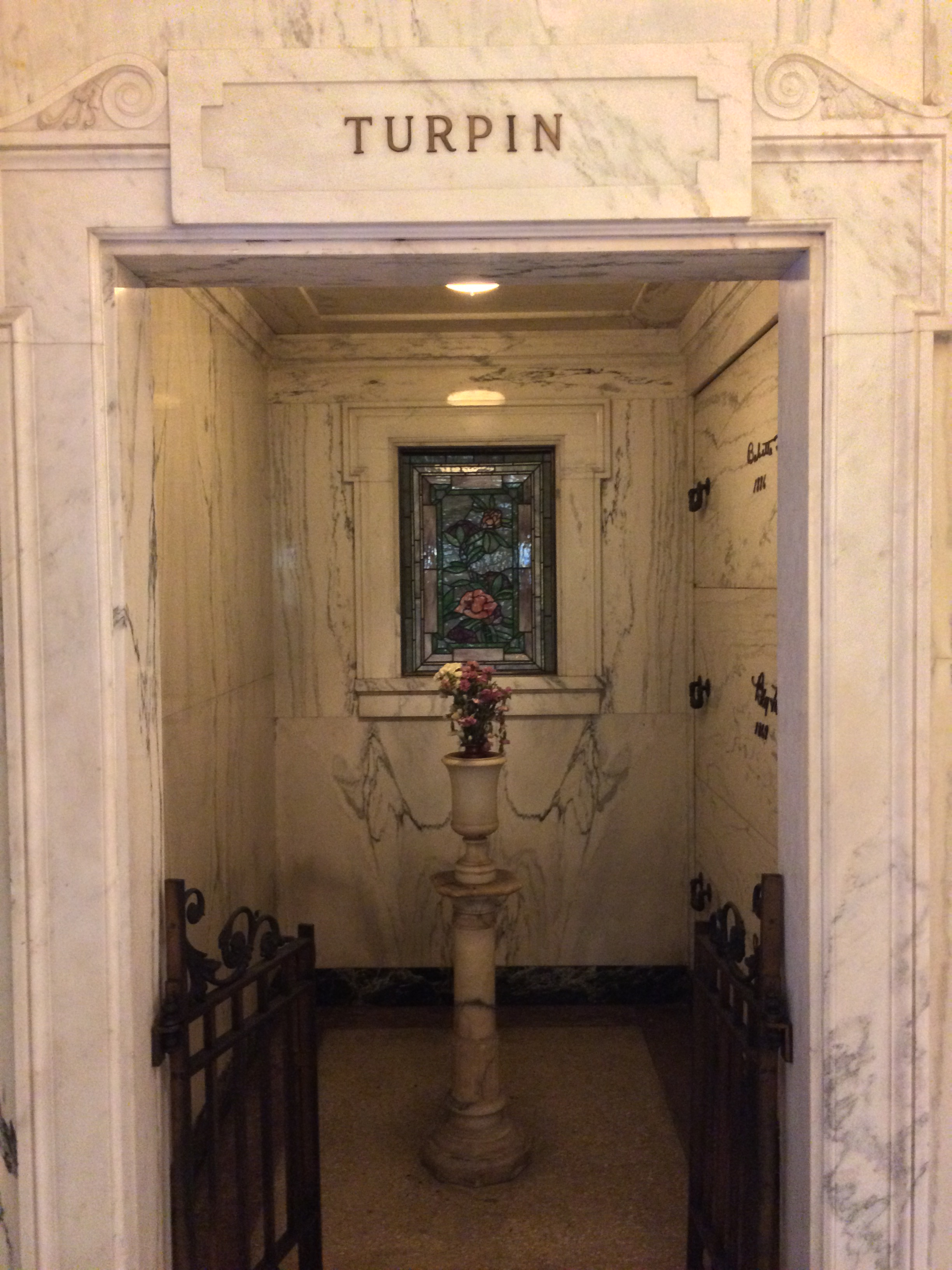
Crypt of Ben Turpin, in the Great Mausoleum, Forest Lawn Glendale

== Filmography ==
Year	Title	Role	Notes
1909	Mr. Flip	Mr. Flip	Short subject, uncredited
1914	Madame Double X	Mr. Von Crooks Jr.	Short subject Lost film
1915	His New Job	Film Extra in Anteroom	Short subject, uncredited
1915	A Night Out	Fellow Reveler	Short subject, uncredited
1915	The Champion	Ringside Vendor	Short subject, uncredited
1915	A Burlesque on Carmen	Remendados, the Smuggler	
1917	A Clever Dummy	A Romantic Janitor	Short subject
1918	Watch Your Neighbor	Banana Peel Victim	Short subject Lost film
1919	Yankee Doodle in Berlin	A Prussian Guardsman	
1919	Salome vs. Shenandoah	Actor Playing New General	Short subject Lost film
1920	Down on the Farm	The Faithful Wife's Husband	
1920	Married Life	Rodney St. Clair – a Man's Man	
1920	Cupid's Day Off	1st Shoe Salesman	Lost film
1921	A Small Town Idol	Sam Smith	
1921	Home Talent	Stranded Actor	
1921	Molly O	Minor Role	Uncredited
1923	The Shriek of Araby	Bill Poster – The Sheik	
1923	Hollywood	Ben Turpin	Lost film
1925	Hogan's Alley	The Stranger	Incomplete film
1925	Steel Preferred	Bartender	Lost film
1927	The College Hero	The Janitor	
1928	The Wife's Relations	Rodney St. Clair	Lost film
1928	A Woman's Way	Minor Role	Uncredited
1929	The Love Parade	Cross-Eyed Lackey	Uncredited
1929	The Show of Shows	Waiter in "What Became of the Floradora Boys" Number	
1930	A Royal Romance	Cossack Guard	Uncredited
1930	Swing High	Bartender	
1931	Cracked Nuts	Cross-Eyed Ben	Uncredited
1931	Our Wife	Wm. Gladding, justice of the peace	
1931	Ambassador Bill	The Butcher	
1932	Make Me a Star	Ben Turpin	
1932	Million Dollar Legs	Mysterious Man	
1932	Hypnotized	Himself – Cameo Appearance	Uncredited
1934	The Law of the Wild	Henry	Serial
1934	Hollywood on Parade#B-9	Bartender	
1935	Keystone Hotel	Count Drewa Blanc	
1939	Hollywood Cavalcade	Bartender	
1940	Saps at Sea	Cross-Eyed Plumber	(final film role)

== See also ==
- Age fabrication

== Sources ==
- Rydzewski, Steve (2013). For Art's Sake: The Biography & Filmography Of Ben Turpin. Albany, Georgia: BearManor Media. ISBN 978-1593932633.
- Huff, Theodore (1951). Charlie Chaplin. New York: Henry Schuman.
- Goldwyn, Samuel (1923). Behind the Screen. New York City: George H. Doran Company.
- Seldes, Gilbert (1924). The Seven Lively Arts. New York City: Harper & Brothers.
