= Thunder in the Night =

1935 film by George Archainbaud

- Directed by: George Archainbaud
- Screenplay by: Frances Hyland; Eugene Solow
- Based on: A Woman Lies by Ladislas Fodor
- Produced by: John Stone
- Starring: Edmund Lowe; Karen Morley; Paul Cavanagh; Una O'Connor; Gene Lockhart; John Qualen
- Cinematography: Bert Glennon
- Music by: Samuel Kaylin
- Production company: Fox Film Corporation
- Distributed by: 20th Century Fox
- Release date: September 20, 1935
- Running time: 69 minutes
- Country: United States
- Language: English

Thunder in the Night is a 1935 American crime film directed by George Archainbaud and written by Frances Hyland and Eugene Solow. It is based on the 1934 play A Woman Lies by Ladislas Fodor. The film stars Edmund Lowe, Karen Morley, Paul Cavanagh, Una O'Connor, Gene Lockhart and John Qualen. The film was released on September 20, 1935, by 20th Century Fox.

== Plot ==
Torok, a police captain in Budapest, is pleased when his friend, Count Peter Alvinczy, is elected to the presidency of the government's cabinet. Alvinczy is married to Madalaine, whose first husband, Paul Szegedy, long believed to be dead, turns up and threatens to publicly embarrass Alvinczy by revealing his wife to be already married.

Szegedy's mistress and partner in a theatrical act, Katherine Szabo, tries in vain to change his mind, even telling Torok at the police precinct what is occurring. He goes through with the scheme to blackmail Madalaine and is soon found dead by Torok, shot through the heart on the street.

Madelaine becomes the prime suspect in Torok's investigation and is placed under arrest. Her husband confesses to the murder, trying to protect her. Torok, however, deduces that Katherine, a sharpshooter in their performing act, picked up a gun in the police station when no one was looking and, through a window, shot her lover. Found out, Katherine kills herself. Torok then releases Madalaine, promising to keep her secret and protect his friend.

== Cast ==
- Edmund Lowe as Captain Karl Torok
- Karen Morley as Madalaine
- Paul Cavanagh as Count Peter Alvinczy
- Una O'Connor as Julie
- Gene Lockhart as Gabor
- John Qualen as Porter
- Russell Hicks as Prefect of Police
- Arthur Edmund Carewe as Professor Omega
- Bodil Rosing as Lisa
- Gloria Roy as Katherine Szabo
- Cornelius Keefe as Paul Szeged
- Polly Ann Young as Torok's Date
- Herman Bing as Taxi Driver
- Luis Alberni as Taxi Driver
- Landers Stevens as Hans
