= Oh, You Tony! =

1924 film

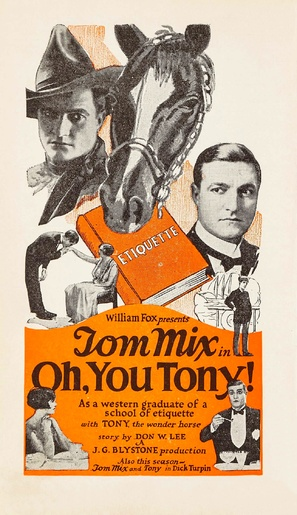
- Directed by: John G. Blystone
- Screenplay by: Donald W. Lee
- Starring: Tom Mix; Claire Adams; Dick La Reno; Earle Foxe; Dolores Rousse; Charles K. French
- Cinematography: Daniel B. Clark
- Production company: Fox Film Corporation
- Distributed by: Fox Film Corporation
- Release date: September 21, 1924
- Running time: 70 minutes
- Country: United States
- Languages: Silent; English intertitles

Oh, You Tony! is a 1924 American silent comedy Western film directed by John G. Blystone and written by Donald W. Lee. The film stars Tom Mix, Claire Adams, Dick La Reno, Earle Foxe, Dolores Rousse and Charles K. French. The film was released on September 21, 1924, by Fox Film Corporation.

== Cast ==
- Tom Mix as Tom Masters
- Claire Adams as Betty Faine
- Dick La Reno as Mark Langdon
- Earle Foxe as Jim Overton
- Dolores Rousse as The Countess
- Charles K. French as Blakely
- Pat Chrisman as The Chief
- Miles McCarthy as Senator from Arizona
- Mathilde Brundage as Senator's Wife
- May Wallace as Etiqutte Instructor
- Tony the Horse as Tony

== Preservation status ==
- This picture is preserved in the Library of Congress collection.
