= The Shriek of Araby =

1923 film by F. Richard Jones

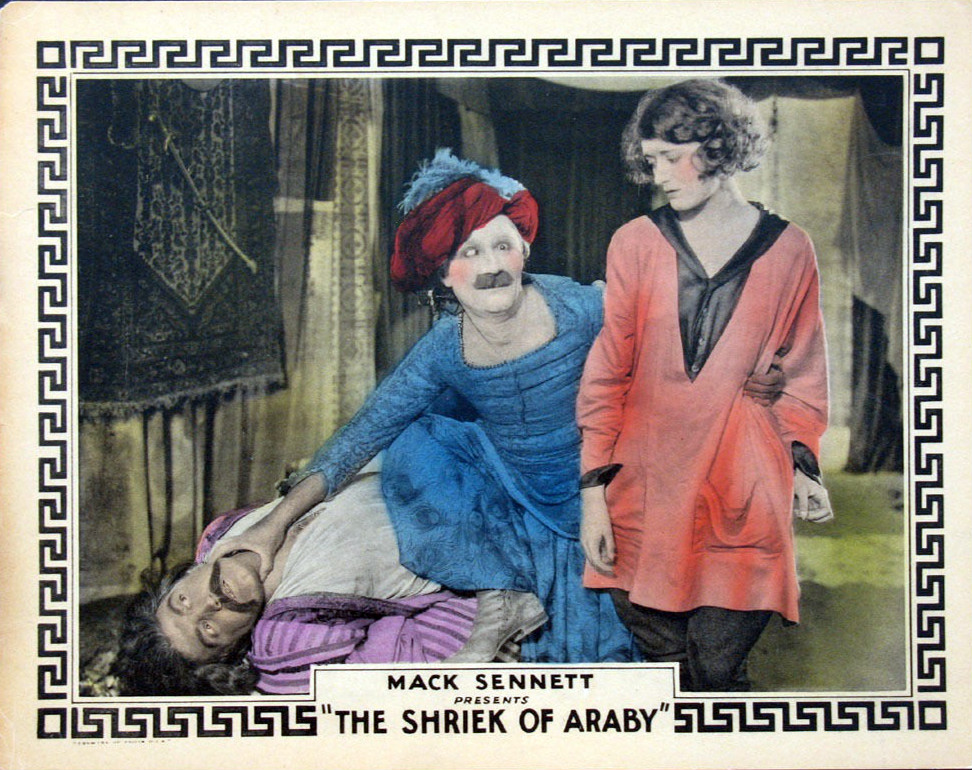
- Lobby card
- Directed by: F. Richard Jones
- Written by: Mack Sennett
- Produced by: Mack Sennett
- Starring: Ben Turpin
- Cinematography: Homer Scott; Robert Walters
- Edited by: Allen McNeil
- Distributed by: United Artists
- Release date: March 5, 1923
- Running time: 50 Minutes
- Country: United States
- Languages: Silent; English intertitles
- Budget: $52,649.90

The Shriek of Araby is a 1923 American silent film comedy starring Ben Turpin and directed by F. Richard Jones for producer Mack Sennett, who also wrote the screenplay.

The film is a spoof of Rudolph Valentino’s hit 1921 film The Sheik and features Turpin as a bill poster daydreaming about having various adventures as an Arabian sheik.

== Plot ==
Outside the Palace Theatre (a cinema showing "The Sheik") a man sits on a horse, emulating Rudolph Valentino. Two girls look at him dreamily.

Ben, the bill poster appears, he is a daydreamer. His boss gives him fliers to hand out, promoting the film. He spends too much time with the girls and is reprimanded by the boss who also decides he is tired of paying the man on the horse and tells him to go back to Arabia. The boss tells Ben to put on this arab uniform after his break...

We jump to a small ship on a large sea, the SS Barnacle. Ben complains to the captain that he did not want to be shanghaied. A young female artist is also on board: she sketches Mohamet, a man in arab costume. Ben admires her work. The two men end up fighting after Ben flirts with the girl and calls the man a "camel jockey". They swap clothes and Ben gets thrown overboard luckily with a canoe thrown after him. He rows to a beach.

He lies under a palm tree on the beach and an ostrich appears between his legs, and he rides off. He falls off and four horsemen appear. He is taken to their camp where they tell their chief "this freak was annoying an ostrich". The chief is Mohamet from the ship. He calls on his executioner Ali to behead him. Just in the nick of time another Sheik "The Prince" appears at the tent door (the original man on the horse from the beginning) saying that Ben is his honoured guest. He is placed on a throne and the people previously attacking him now bow to him. Ben is to rule while the Prince is in Baghdad.

Two harem girls put him in a magic bag and he is instantly dressed as an arab prince. A magician, Presto, comes and says he can make him a rich sultan. Three young harem girls kneel before his throne and bow to him repeatedly. The Prince departs on a white colt along with a dozen of his men. Presto brings out his crystal ball. It shows the artist girl sketching a man on a horse in the desert. He says "your destiny lies seven miles, four feet and eight inches away". They ride to the desert and spot the girl through binoculars, at which point Ben recognises her. The girl and her model try to escape but she is caught by Ben.

Back at camp he demands that she be his wife. Mohamet intervenes and he fires him. He demands she goes to the kitchen to "rattle some pots and pans". He orders one of the harem girls to prepare her for the wedding. Mohamet promises her he will help her escape and brings on Magnolia, a big scantily dressed black dancing girl. He covers her with a big veil. When she dances for Ben he thinks it is the artist. When she takes the veil off he recoils.

Meanwhile Mohamet tells the artist he only saved her so he could have her himself. Ben appears and they fight. Mohamet runs off. Ben fires a jezail musket at him as he disappears over a dune. Ben fetches a horse so the girl can leave. But she has fallen in love and wants to stay. "Dinner!" he commands.

They eat ostrich eggs. She stares at him longingly. Their photo is on the front of the newspaper. He phones Presto to organise a fishing trip. Monday is laundry day, the artist (in harem gear) scrubs over a tub. Ben says he will bring home lots of fish. Three slaves carry him off on a strange mobile hammock. He meets Presto at a palm tree and asks him to magic up a pond of fish.

Meanwhile the Bandit King smokes a hookah and watches girls bathing in his pool. Mohamet appears and tells him he should steal Ben's wife to be the prize of his harem. He rides to the camp with his men while Ben and Presto are still fishing. She i bundled up nd carried off.

As Ben and Presto are fishing a lion appears. Presto reaches for his wand but the lion lunges and they have to run off at speed. Presto creates a rope ladder using his wand and they both escape by climbing up. Presto waves his wand and the lion changes into a cat. He is asked why he didn't do that sooner. With the binoculars they spot the Bandit King and his men taking the girl away. Presto magics up a horse and a camel. Ben struggles to work out how to sit on the camel's hump and eventually borrows a horse instead.

The Bandit King throws the girl on his bed and starts to disrobe. Then he forces her to scrub the laundry. Ben arrives carrying a scimitar. He finds the Bandit King worshipping at a strange shrine. He is told to wait and a strange machine grabs him when the Bandit turns a head on the shrine. The girl appears and the Bandit traps her in a similar way. Ben throws a knife at the head and the machine releases him. The Bandit reappears and pushes the second head down causing the column the girl is trapped on to fly sideways to the pool area where it starts to sink. Ben and the Bandit King fight and push and pull the levers on the shrine and the girl goes up and down. The Bandit King is trapped in his own machine. As Presto arrives with help the Bandit King is drowned with his own invention.

Back at the Palace Theatre Ben is sleeping on the horse. A policeman wakes him.

== Cast ==
- Ben Turpin as Bill poster / Sheik
- Kathryn McGuire as The Heroine
- Ray Grey as The Prince
- George Cooper as Presto the Magician
- Charles Stevenson as Luke Hassan
- Dick Sutherland as Ali and as the Bandit king
- Tiny Ward as the ship's captain
- Kewpie Morgan as policeman
