= Saps at Sea =

1940 film by Gordon Douglas

- Theatrical poster
- Directed by: Gordon Douglas
- Written by: Felix Adler; Harry Langdon; Gil Pratt; Charles Rogers
- Produced by: Hal Roach
- Starring: Stan Laurel; Oliver Hardy; Richard Cramer
- Cinematography: Art Lloyd
- Edited by: William Ziegler
- Music by: Marvin Hatley; Leroy Shield
- Distributed by: United Artists
- Release date: May 3, 1940
- Running time: 55:52
- Country: United States
- Language: English
- Box office: $225,139

Saps at Sea is a 1940 American comedy film directed by Gordon Douglas, distributed by United Artists. It was Laurel and Hardy's last film produced by the Hal Roach Studios, as well as the last film to feature Ben Turpin and Harry Bernard.

== Plot ==
Stan and Ollie work in a horn factory, where the constant noise exacerbates Hardy's stress levels. Their predicament is underscored by the frequent mental breakdowns of their colleagues, a situation highlighted by a recent incident resulting in a worker's descent into madness. Ollie, succumbing to "hornophobia," is sent home from work due to his heightened aversion to horn sounds. Concerned about Ollie's condition, Stan proposes a therapeutic boat trip to alleviate his friend's anxiety. However, their plans for a docked boat excursion are disrupted by a series of comedic mishaps, including a gas explosion in their kitchen caused by a cross-eyed plumber who has mixed up the gas and water pipes.

As they embark on their boat trip aboard the ill-fated vessel "Prickly Heat," unforeseen events ensue, including the unwelcome presence of an escaped convict named Nick Grainger. With the goat they brought along inadvertently setting the boat adrift and the armed Nick taking control of the situation, Stan and Ollie find themselves at the mercy of the criminal's whims. In a turn of events, Stan's trombone playing inadvertently triggers Ollie's uncontrollable rage and makes him forget his fear of Nick, leading to a physical confrontation in which Ollie overpowers him. Ultimately, Stan's musical intervention aids in subduing the criminal, albeit with unforeseen consequences as the police arrive in a patrol boat.

Despite Stan's attempts to demonstrate to the cops about the trombone's role in helping Ollie to defeat Nick, their efforts backfire spectacularly, causing the again-blindly-enraged Ollie to assault the officers, resulting in the pair's arrest and incarceration alongside Nick.

== Cast ==
- Stan Laurel - Stan
- Oliver Hardy - Ollie
- Richard Cramer - Nick Granger
- James Finlayson - Dr. Finlayson
- Ben Turpin - Cross-eyed plumber
- Eddie Conrad - Prof. O'Brien
- Charlie Hall - Desk clerk
- Harry Bernard - Harbor Patrol captain
- Patsy O'Byrne - Mother
- Francesca Santoro - Little girl
- Harry Hayden - Mr. Sharp
- Robert McKenzie - Capt. McKenzie
- Patsy Moran - Switchboard operator
- Gene Morgan - First policeman
- Mary Gordon - Mrs. O'Riley
- Eddie Borden - Berserk employee

== Production notes ==
- When Laurel and Hardy left the Hal Roach studio after this film, they also left behind Roach stock supporting players Charlie Hall, James Finlayson, and Harry Bernard.
- The film also stars Mary Gordon, who played Mrs. Hudson opposite Basil Rathbone's Sherlock Holmes.
- The film was shown aboard HMS Prince of Wales during the voyage to Newfoundland, where Franklin Delano Roosevelt and Winston Churchill met to establish the Atlantic Charter. It was a favorite film of Churchill, who called it "A gay but inconsequent entertainment".
- The title is an allusion to the 1937 film Souls at Sea, starring Gary Cooper and George Raft.
- This was the last film to feature the once popular silent film comedian Ben Turpin, who has a small cameo as the cross-eyed plumber and died on 1 July 1940, less than two months after the film's release. It was also the last film for Harry Bernard, who died on 4 November 1940.
- Saps at Sea is referenced in the Ray Bradbury short story "Night Call, Collect", where a lone Earthman marooned on the abandoned Mars colony is described as watching this Laurel & Hardy film, among various media tapes with which he passes his time.

== Reception ==
Leonard Maltin gave it three of four stars: "L&H comedy is short and sweet: Ollie has breakdown working in horn factory, tries to relax on a small boat with Stan . . . and that's impossible. Cramer is a memorable heavy." Leslie Halliwell wrote, "Disappointing star comedy with gags too few and too long drawn out."
