= Molly O =

1921 film

Molly O'
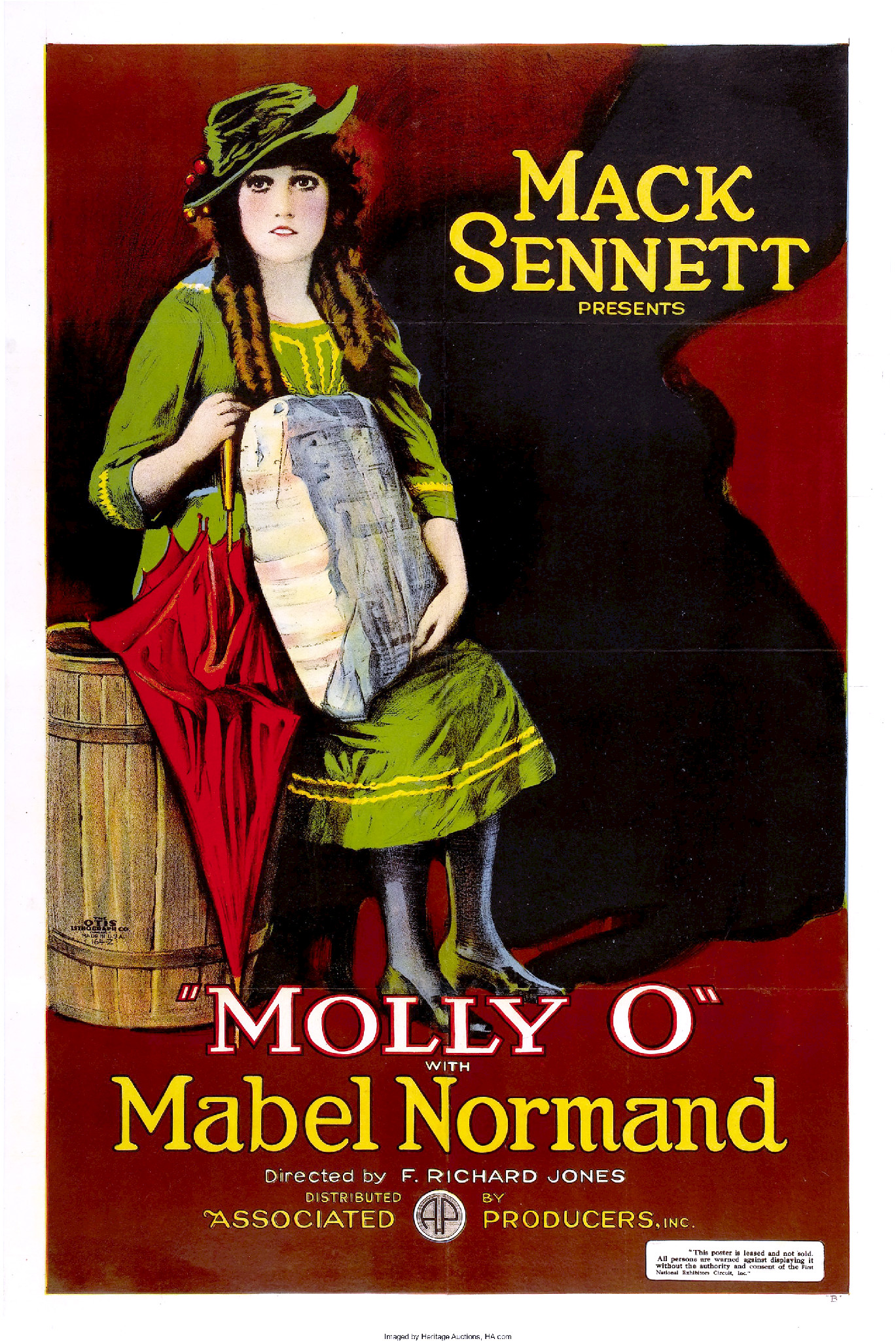
- Film poster
- Directed by: F. Richard Jones; Ray Grey (assistant director)
- Written by: Mary Hunt; Fred Stowers (screenplay); Mack Sennett (story); John Grey (titles)
- Produced by: Mack Sennett
- Starring: Mabel Normand; George Nichols
- Cinematography: Fred Jackman; Homer Scott
- Edited by: Allen McNeil
- Distributed by: Associated First National Pictures
- Release date: November 20, 1921
- Running time: 80 minutes
- Country: United States
- Language: Silent (English intertitles)

Molly O' is a 1921 American silent comedy film starring Mabel Normand and directed by F. Richard Jones.

== Cast ==
- Mabel Normand as Molly O'
- George Nichols as Tim O'Dair
- Anna Dodge as Mrs. Tim O'Dair (as Anna Hernandez)
- Albert Hackett as Billy O'Dair
- Eddie Gribbon as Jim Smith
- Jack Mulhall as Dr. John S. Bryant
- Lowell Sherman as Fred Manchester
- Jacqueline Logan as Miriam Manchesteer
- Ben Deeley as Albert Faulkner
- Gloria Davenport as Mrs. James W. Robbins
- Carl Stockdale as The Silhouette Man
- Eugenie Besserer as Antonia Bacigalupi
- Al Cooke as Man in Balcony at Charity Ball (uncredited)
- Floy Guinn as Minor Role (uncredited)
- Irene as Minor Role (uncredited)
- Mildred June as Minor Role (uncredited)
- Kathryn McGuire as Minor Role (uncredited)
- John B. O'Brien as Minor Role (uncredited)
- John J. Richardson as Man at Social Gathering (uncredited)
- Peggy Rompers as Minor Role (uncredited)
- Ben Turpin as Minor Role (uncredited)

== See also ==
- List of rediscovered films
