= The Snarl of Hate =

- Directed by: Noel M. Smith
- Written by: Ben Allah; Edward Curtiss; Noel M. Smith
- Produced by: Samuel Bischoff
- Starring: Johnnie Walker; Mildred June; Jack Richardson
- Cinematography: James S. Brown Jr.
- Production company: Samuel Bischoff Productions
- Release date: March 15, 1927
- Running time: 60 minutes
- Country: United States
- Languages: Silent; English intertitles

The Snarl of Hate is a 1927 American silent drama film directed by Noel M. Smith and starring Johnnie Walker, Mildred June and Jack Richardson.

== Cast ==
- Johnnie Walker as Charles Taylor / Robert Taylor
- Mildred June as Laura Warren
- Jack Richardson as William Reynolds
- Wheeler Oakman as Boy Maxson

== Bibliography ==
- Woods, Richard. Johnnie Walker: Silent Movies' Favorite Son. 1999.
