= Crinoline and Romance =

1923 film directed by Harry Beaumont

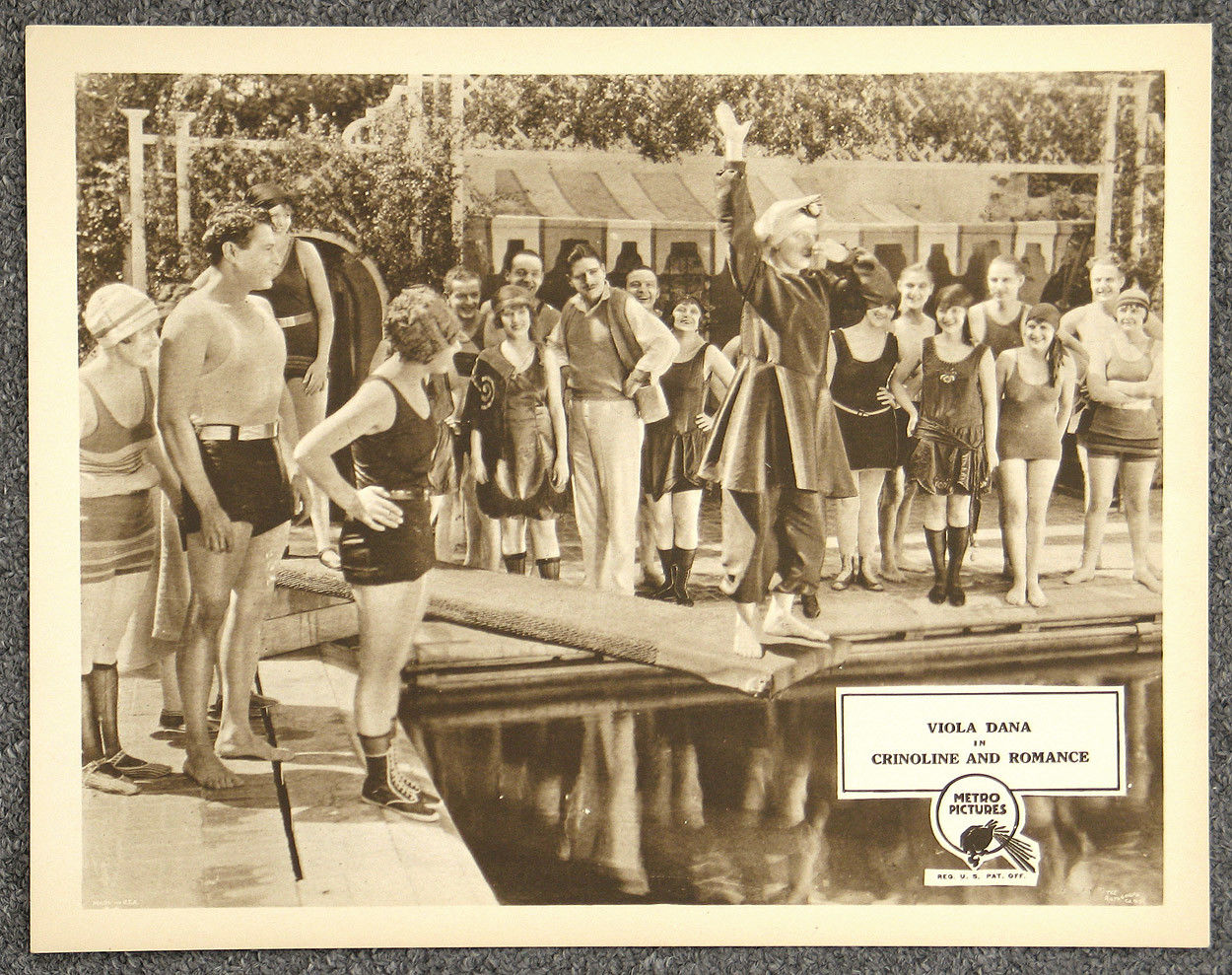
- Lobby card
- Directed by: Harry Beaumont
- Written by: Bernard McConville
- Starring: Viola Dana; Claude Gillingwater; John Bowers
- Cinematography: John Arnold
- Production company: Metro Pictures
- Distributed by: Metro Pictures
- Release date: February 5, 1923
- Running time: 60 minutes
- Country: United States
- Language: Silent (English intertitles)

Crinoline and Romance is a 1923 American silent comedy film directed by Harry Beaumont and starring Viola Dana, Claude Gillingwater, and John Bowers.

== Plot ==
As described in a film magazine, Colonel Charles E. Cavanaugh lives in a secluded district of North Carolina with his orphaned granddaughter Emmy Lou. He has raised her in utter ignorance of life beyond this one spot and she still wears crinolines. The old home of the Cavanaughs is now in the hands of the Colonel's niece, Mrs. Kate Wimbleton, a middle-aged society woman who likes to surround herself with young people. She invites Emmy Lou to visit her but the grandfather refuses, so she sends Davis Jordan to help rescue the niece from her plight. When Jordan finds Emmy Lou, the servants force him off the place. Emmy Lou decides to runaway and visit her aunt. Her old fashioned ideas and costume win over the men and she proves a great success. Then she learns of her grandfather's illness and returns home to be with him. Jordan and Augustus Biddle follow her. Both men are in love with her and she cannot decide which she would like to marry. The bitter feeling between the two leads to a fist fight, and the Colonel decides it would be better settled with pistols in a duel. When Biddle cheats, Emmy Lou has no difficulty in making her choice.

== Cast ==
- Viola Dana as Miss Emmy Lou
- Claude Gillingwater as Col. Charles E. Cavanaugh
- John Bowers as Davis Jordan
- Allan Forrest as Augustus Biddle
- Betty Francisco as Kitty Biddle
- Mildred June as Birdie Bevans
- Lillian Lawrence as Mrs. Kate Wimbleton
- Gertrude Short as Sibil Vane
- Lillian Leighton as Abigail
- Nick Cogley as Uncle Mose

== Preservation ==
Crinoline and Romance is a lost film.

== Bibliography ==
- Munden, Kenneth White. The American Film Institute Catalog of Motion Pictures Produced in the United States, Part 1. University of California Press, 1997.
