= Against All Odds (1924 film) =

1924 film

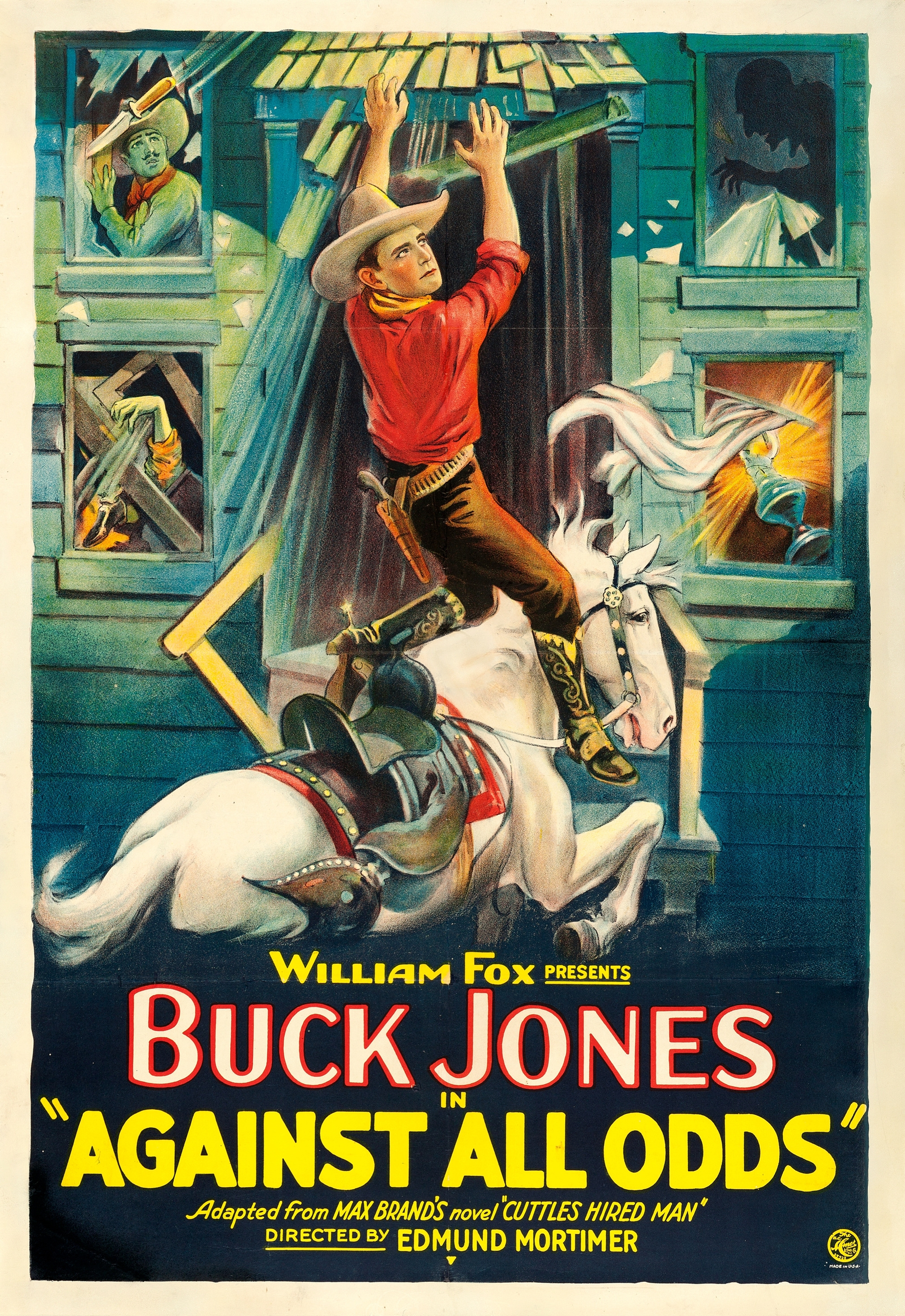
- Theatrical release poster
- Directed by: Edmund Mortimer
- Written by: Frederick Chapin
- Based on: short story, Cuttle's Hired Hand by Max Brand.
- Produced by: William Fox
- Starring: Buck Jones
- Cinematography: Joseph Brotherton
- Production company: Fox Film Corporation
- Distributed by: Fox Film Corporation
- Release date: July 27, 1924
- Running time: 5 reels
- Country: United States
- Languages: Silent; English intertitles

Against All Odds is a lost 1924 American silent Western film directed by Edmund Mortimer and starring Buck Jones. It was produced and distributed by Fox Film Corporation.

== Cast ==
- Buck Jones as Chick Newton
- Dolores Rousse as Judy Malone
- Ben Hendricks Jr. as Jim Sawyer
- William Scott as Bill Warner
- Thais Valdemar as Olivetta
- William N. Bailey as Tom Curtis
- Bernard Siegel as Lewis
- Jack McDonald as Warner's Uncle

== Preservation ==
With no holdings located in archives, Against All Odds is considered a lost film.

== See also ==
- 1937 Fox vault fire
