= No Mother to Guide Her =

1923 film

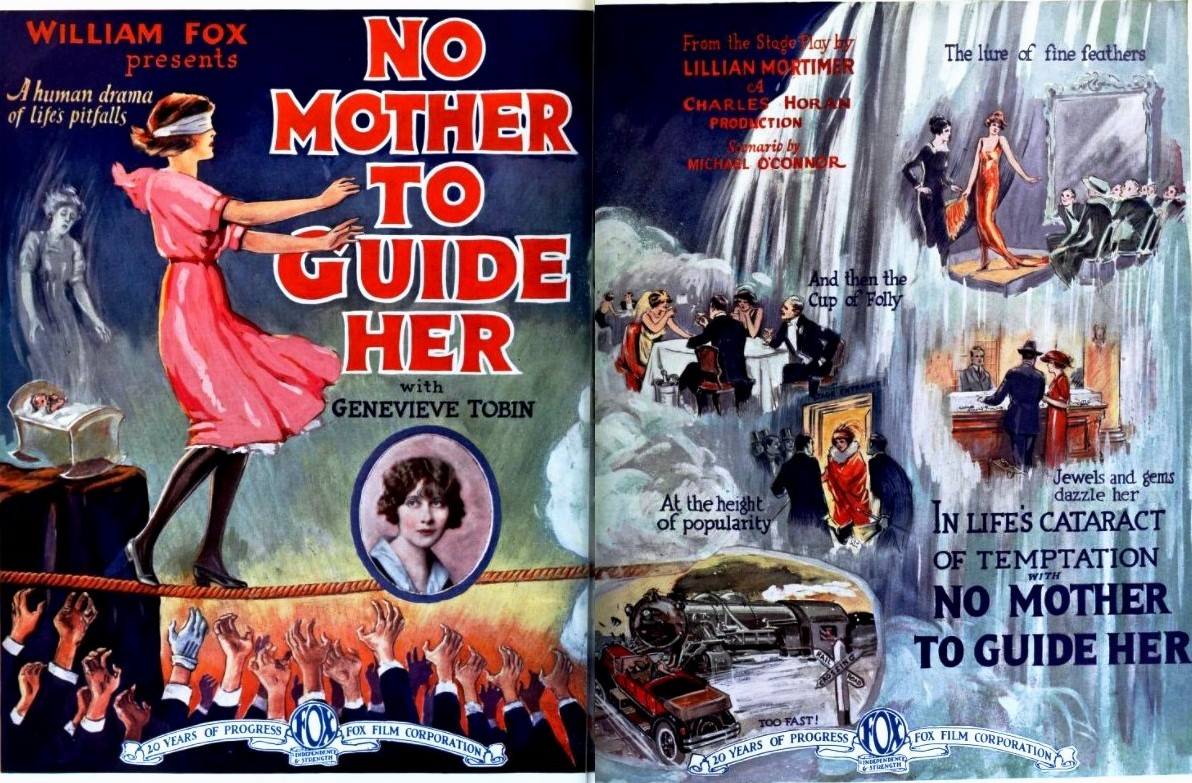
- Advertisement
- Directed by: Charles Horan
- Screenplay by: Michael O'Connor
- Based on: No Mother to Guide Her by Lillian Mortimer
- Starring: Genevieve Tobin; John Webb Dillion; Lolita Robertson; Katherine Downer; Dolores Rousse; Frank Wunderlee
- Edited by: Tom Malloy
- Production company: Fox Film Corporation
- Distributed by: Fox Film Corporation
- Release date: October 14, 1923
- Running time: 70 minutes
- Country: United States
- Language: Silent (English intertitles)

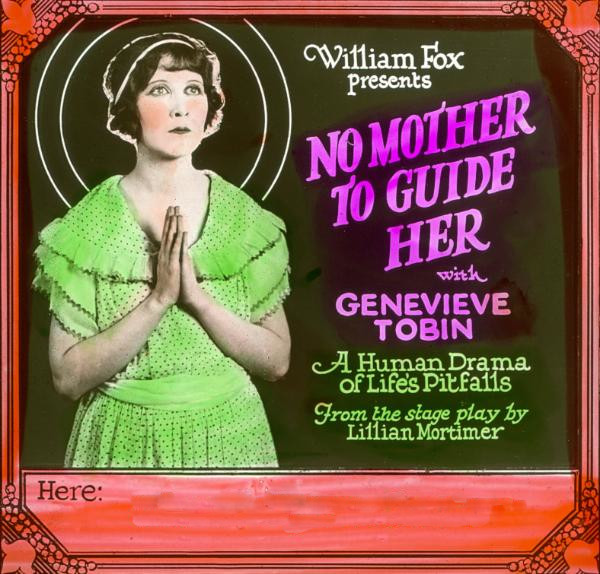
Lantern slide

No Mother to Guide Her is a 1923 American drama film directed by Charles Horan and written by Michael O'Connor. It is based on the 1905 play No Mother to Guide Her by Lillian Mortimer. The film stars Genevieve Tobin, John Webb Dillion, Lolita Robertson, Katherine Downer, Dolores Rousse and Frank Wunderlee. The film was released on October 14, 1923, by Fox Film Corporation.

== Cast ==
- Genevieve Tobin as Mary Boyd
- John Webb Dillion as Charles Pearson
- Lolita Robertson as Mrs. Pearson
- Katherine Downer as Kathleen Pearson
- Dolores Rousse as Kathleen Pearson
- Frank Wunderlee as Jim Boyd
- Maude Hill as Mrs. Boyd
- Ruth Sullivan as Mary Boyd
- John D. Walsh as The Grandfather
- Jack Richardson as James Walling
- George Dewey as Donald Walling
- Jack McLean as Donald Walling
- Lillian Lee as Donald Walling's Sister
- Marion Stevenson as Widow Mills
- Bill Quinn as Billy Mills
- Irving Hartley as Billy Mills

== Preservation ==
With no prints of No Mother to Guide Her located in any film archives, it is a lost film.
