= Eva Thatcher =

American actress

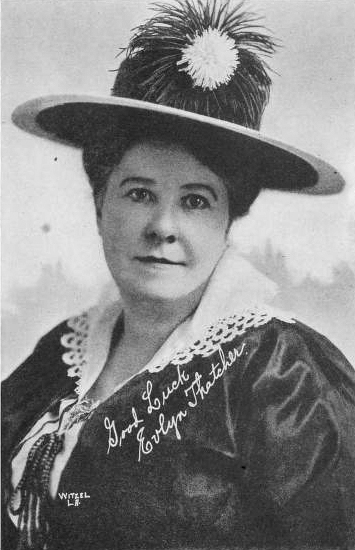
- Eva Thatcher
- Born: March 14, 1862; Omaha, Nebraska
- Died: September 28, 1942 (aged 80); Los Angeles, California
- Other names: Evlyn Thatcher
- Occupation: Actress
- Years active: 1912–1930

Eva Thatcher (March 14, 1862 – September 28, 1942) was an American film actress and vaudeville performer. She appeared in more than one hundred films between 1912 and 1930. She was born in Omaha, Nebraska, and died in Los Angeles, California.

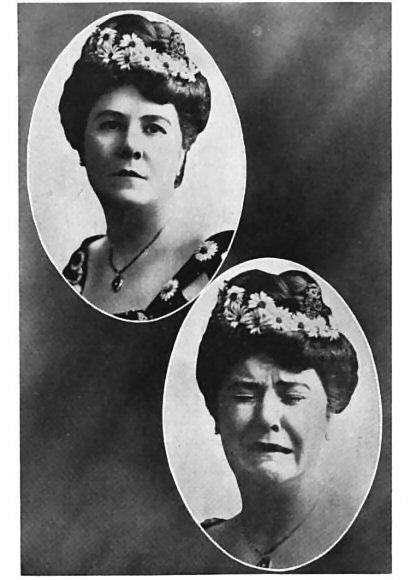
Who's Who in the Film World, 1914

== Selected filmography ==
- The Count (1916)
- Luke's Movie Muddle (1916)
- Luke's Newsie Knockout (1916)
- Luke's Lost Lamb (1916)
- Luke, Crystal Gazer (1916)
- Luke Rides Roughshod (1916)
- Haystacks and Steeples (1916)
- A Clever Dummy (1917)
- Mickey (1918)
- Yankee Doodle in Berlin (1918)
- Salome vs. Shenandoah (1919)
- Down on the Farm (1920)
- The Rent Collector (1921)
- The Bakery (1921)
- The Counter Jumper (1922)
- Golf (1922)
- A Friendly Husband (1923)
- A Chapter in Her Life (1923)
- The Knockout Kid (1925)
- The Outlaw Express (1926)
- The Blind Trail (1926)
- Blazing Days (1927)
