= Dolores Rousse =

American film actress

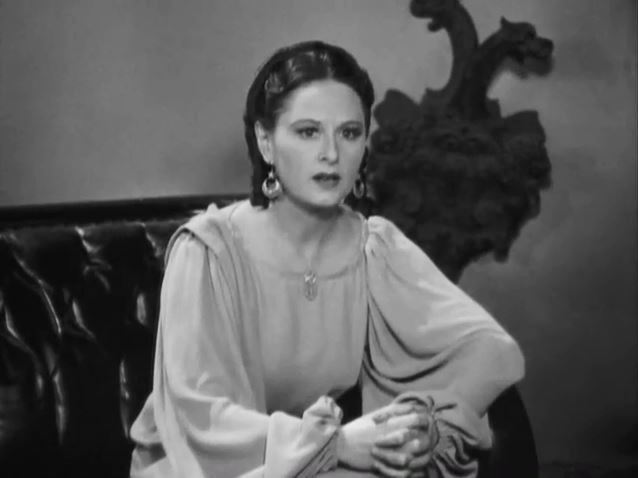
- Still from Charlie Chan's Secret (1936)
- Born: August 17, 1901; San Jose, California, United States
- Died: December 16, 1985 (aged 84); Santa Clara, California, United States
- Other names: Gloria Roy
- Occupation: Actress
- Years active: 1923-1940

Dolores Rousse (August 17, 1901 – December 16, 1985) was an American film actress who performed under the name Gloria Roy later in her career.

== Career ==
In May 1922, it was reported that Rousse would appear in Ziegfeld Follies after she won a newspaper beauty contest.

Her first film was No Mother to Guide Her (1923). The Plain Speaker wrote, "Another prominent actress in the photodrama is Dolores Rousse, who was with the Follies previous to her first screen appearance in No Mother to Guide Her. Her work in this picture gained her a contract and a leading part in other Fox productions".

Variety noted her performance in Against All Odds (1924), calling her character a "rather an insipid heroine, possibly because the love interest is never emphasized to any appreciable degree".

The Ukiah Dispatch Democrat wrote of her performance in Oh, You Tony!: "Dolores is not only an actress, but if she came on the stage with the lights turned off, the audience would think that she carried her own spotlight--this child sends forth an aura of light in the brilliance of her beauty".

Variety wrote the following about her performance in Thunder in the Night (1935): "Gloria Roy, girl who murdered her would-be blackmailer out of unrequited love, isn't in the footage as much as others, but gives a good account of herself while there."

She appeared in films in the Charlie Chan series and in the Mr. Moto series.

== Partial filmography ==
=== Credited as Dolores Rousse ===
- No Mother to Guide Her (1923) as Kathleen Pearson
- Ladies to Board (1924) as Model
- The Trouble Shooter (1924) as Chiquita
- Dark Stairways (1924) as Madge Armstrong
- Against All Odds (1924) as Judy Malone
- Oh, You Tony! (1924) as The Countess
- Troubles of a Bride (1924) as Vera
- The Burning Trail (1925) as Esther Ramsey (credited as Dolores Roussey)

=== Credited as Gloria Roy ===
- Hot Pepper (1933) as Lily
- Charlie Chan's Greatest Case (1933) as Arlene Compton
- Jimmy and Sally (1933) as Shirley
- Wild Gold (1934) as one of the Golden Girls
- Life Begins at 40 (1935) as Girl (uncredited)
- Asegure a su mujer (1935)
- Charlie Chan in Paris (1935) as Minor Part (uncredited)
- Charlie Chan in Egypt (1935) as Bit Girl (uncredited)
- Thunder in the Night (1935) as Katherine Szabo
- This Is the Life (1935) as Diane Revier
- Charlie Chan's Secret (1936) as Carlotta
- Song and Dance Man (1936) as Dolores
- Charlie Chan at the Race Track (1936) as Catherine Chester
- Crack-Up (1936) as Operative #16
- The Holy Terror (1937) as Maria Blair
- The Great Hospital Mystery (1937) as Nurse (uncredited)
- Charlie Chan on Broadway (1937) as Hat Check Girl (uncredited)
- Fair Warning (1937) as Grace Hamilton
- Mr. Moto's Gamble (1938) as Doctor
- Mr. Moto Takes a Chance (1938) as Keema
- Mr. Moto on Danger Island (1939) as Nurse
- Charlie Chan at Treasure Island (1939) as Plane Passenger (uncredited)
- The Grapes of Wrath (1940) as waitress (uncredited)
- Charlie Chan in Panama (1940) as Hostess (uncredited)
