= Percy (1925 film) =

1925 film

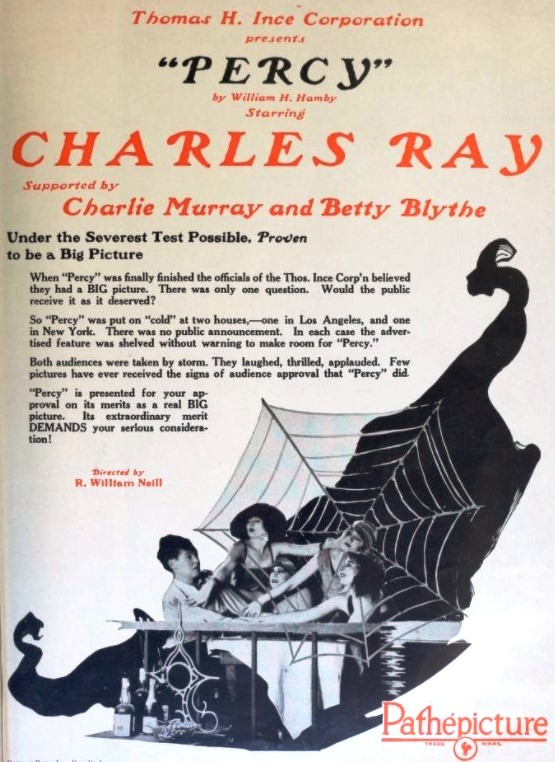
- Advertisement
- Directed by: Roy William Neill
- Written by: J.G. Hawks; Eve Unsell
- Based on: The Desert Fiddler by William Henry Hamby
- Produced by: Thomas H. Ince
- Starring: Charles Ray; Louise Dresser; Victor McLaglen
- Cinematography: James Diamond
- Production company: Thomas H. Ince Corporation
- Distributed by: Pathé Exchange
- Release date: March 24, 1925
- Running time: 60 minutes
- Country: United States
- Language: Silent (English intertitles)

Percy is a lost 1925 American silent comedy film directed by Roy William Neill and starring Charles Ray, Louise Dresser and Victor McLaglen. The film is based upon the novel The Desert Fiddler by William Henry Hamby.

== Plot ==
As described in a film magazine review, Percy Rogeen, a mother’s boy, becomes his dad’s campaign manager and is taught to drink and smoke. In a fight he is thrown into a box car and eventually lands in the desert. He is saved from a gang by Holy Joe. Together they go to a gambling house and save the girl’s property from a gang plotting to get hold of it through holding back the water.

== Cast ==
- Charles Ray as Percival Rogeen
- Louise Dresser as Mrs. Rogers
- Joseph Kilgour as Jasper Rogeen
- Clyde McAtee as James
- Dave Winter as Breezy Barnes
- Charles Murray as Holy Joe
- Victor McLaglen as Reedy Jenkins
- Betty Blythe as Lolita
- Barbara Bedford as Imogene Chandler
- Don Marion as Percival Rogeen, as a boy
- Ethelbert Knott (credited as Adelbert Knott)
- Jack Cosgrave as Minor Role (uncredited)
- Chew Ho as Minor Role (uncredited)
- Richard Neill as Minor Role (uncredited)
- Pat Wing as Little Girl (uncredited)
- Toby Wing as Little Girl (uncredited)

== Preservation ==
With no prints of Percy located in any film archives, it is a lost film.

== Bibliography ==
- Goble, Alan. The Complete Index to Literary Sources in Film. Walter de Gruyter, 1999.
