= Down on the Farm (1920 film) =

1920 film

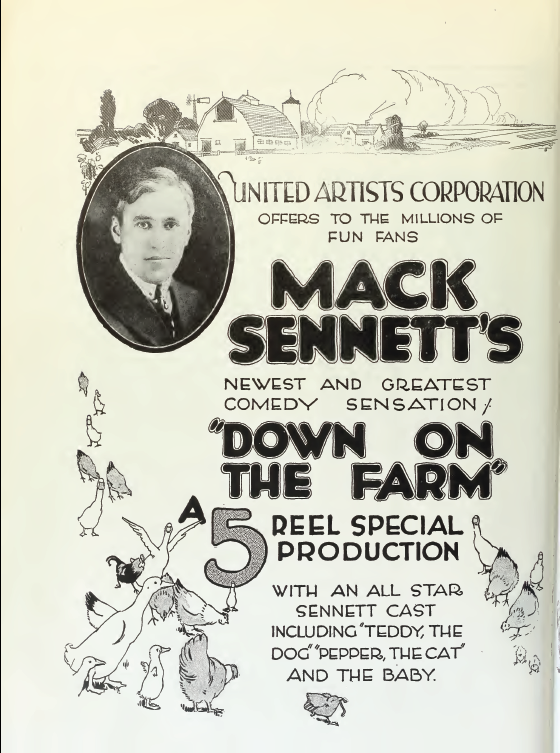
- Advertisement
- Directed by: Erle C. Kenton; Ray Grey; F. Richard Jones
- Written by: Ray Grey; Raymond Griffith; Mack Sennett
- Produced by: Mack Sennett
- Cinematography: Fred Jackman; Perry Evans
- Distributed by: United Artists
- Release date: April 25, 1920
- Running time: 50 minutes; 5 reels
- Country: United States
- Language: Silent (English intertitles)

Down on the Farm is a 1920 silent film feature-length rural comedy produced by Mack Sennett, starring Louise Fazenda, and featuring Harry Gribbon, James Finlayson and Billy Armstrong. It premiered at the Yost Theater in Santa Ana, California, on December 28–30, 1919, and was released nationally three months later, opening at the Strand Theatre in Fort Wayne, Indiana, on April 4, 1920.

Copies survive at the Library of Congress and reportedly at Gosfilmofond, Russian State Archive.

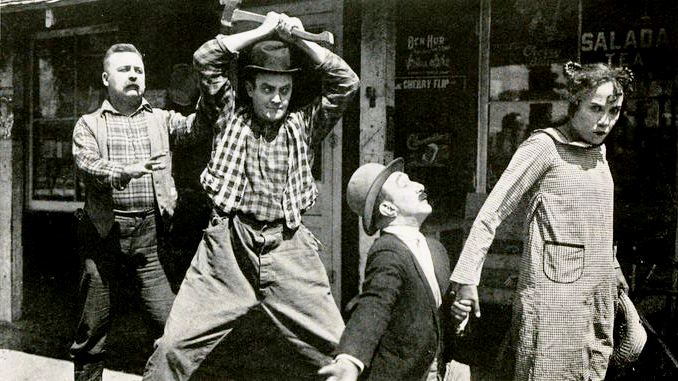
Film still showing (from left) Bert Roach, Harry Gribbon, James Finlayson, and Louise Fazenda

== Cast ==
- Louise Fazenda as Louise, The Farmer's Daughter
- Harry Gribbon as The Rustic Sweetheart
- Bert Roach as Roach, The Farmer
- James Finlayson as The Sportive Banker with the Mortgage
- Billy Armstrong as The Man of Mystery
- Don Marion as The Baby (credited as John Henry Jr.)
- Marie Prevost as The Faithful Wife
- Ben Turpin as The Faithful Wife's Husband
- Dave Anderson as Grocery Man
- Joseph Belmont as The Minister
- Eddie Gribbon as Banker's Henchman
- Kalla Pasha as Mailman
- Fanny Kelly as Gossipy Villager
- Sybil Seely as Maid of Honor (credited as Sibye Trevilla)

=== Uncredited performers ===
- Jane Allen
- Thelma Bates
- Pepper The Cat as herself
- Teddy The Dog as himself
- Elva Diltz
- Frank Earle
- Virginia Fox
- George Gray
- Harriet Hammond as herself, Prologue
- Phyllis Haver as herself, Prologue
- Mildred June
- Patrick Kelly as Villager
- Larry Lyndon as Villager
- Kathryn McGuire as Villager
- John Rand as Villager
- Eva Thatcher as Villager
