= Fashionable Fakers =

1923 film

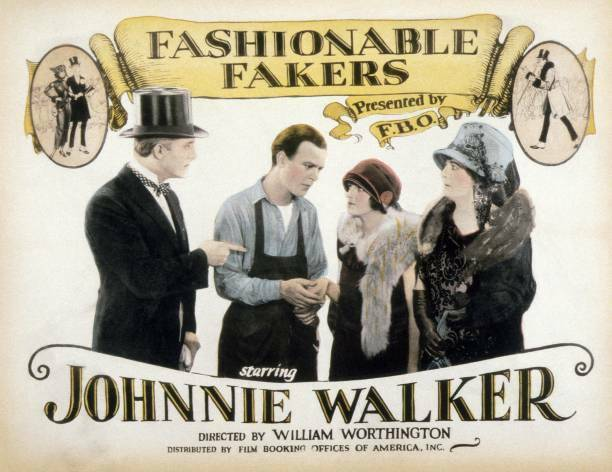
- Directed by: William Worthington
- Written by: Melville W. Brown; Frederick Stowers
- Starring: Johnnie Walker; Mildred June; Lillian Lawrence
- Cinematography: L. William O'Connell
- Production company: Robertson-Cole Pictures Corporation
- Distributed by: Film Booking Offices of America
- Release date: December 16, 1923
- Running time: 50 minutes
- Country: United States
- Languages: Silent; English intertitles

Fashionable Fakers is a 1923 American silent comedy film directed by William Worthington and starring Johnnie Walker, Mildred June and Lillian Lawrence. It was released in Britain with the alternative title A Going Concern.

== Synopsis ==
Thaddeus, an employee at a furniture store who is hired by his unscrupulous boss to doctor furniture to make it seem antique, buys an oriental rug that turns out to have magical powers. Dramatically his luck improves and he marries his sweetheart and gains enough money to buy the shop.

== Cast ==
- Johnnie Walker as Thaddeus Plummer
- Mildred June as Clara Ridder
- George Cowl as Creel
- J. Farrell MacDonald as Pat O'Donnell
- Lillian Lawrence as Mrs. Ridder
- Robert Balder as Mr. Carter
- George Regas as . A. Turk

== Bibliography ==
- Connelly, Robert B. The Silents: Silent Feature Films, 1910-36, Volume 40, Issue 2. December Press, 1998.
- Munden, Kenneth White. The American Film Institute Catalog of Motion Pictures Produced in the United States, Part 1. University of California Press, 1997.
