= Luke's Lost Lamb =

1916 film by Hal Roach

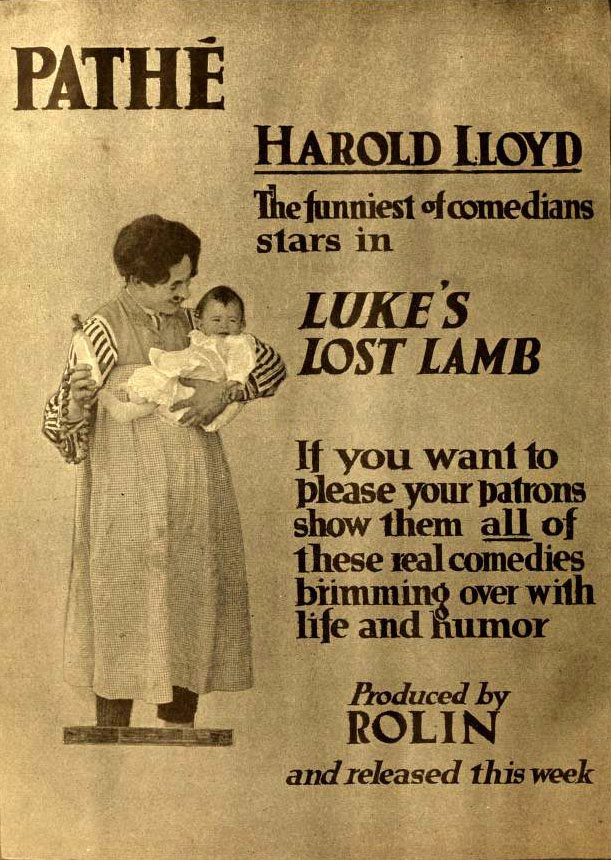
- Directed by: Hal Roach
- Produced by: Hal Roach
- Starring: Harold Lloyd
- Distributed by: Pathé Exchange
- Release date: August 7, 1916
- Country: United States
- Languages: Silent; English intertitles

Luke's Lost Lamb is a 1916 American short comedy film starring Harold Lloyd.. This is now a lost film.

== Cast ==
- Harold Lloyd as Lonesome Luke
- Snub Pollard
- Bebe Daniels
- Charles Stevenson (as Charles E. Stevenson)
- Billy Fay
- Fred C. Newmeyer
- Sammy Brooks
- Harry Todd
- Bud Jamison
- Dee Lampton
- Eva Thatcher (as Evelyn Thatcher)
- Margaret Joslin (as Mrs. Harry Todd)
- Baby Herrington as Lost Lamb

== See also ==
- Harold Lloyd filmography
