= Don Marion Davis =

American child actor (1917–2020)

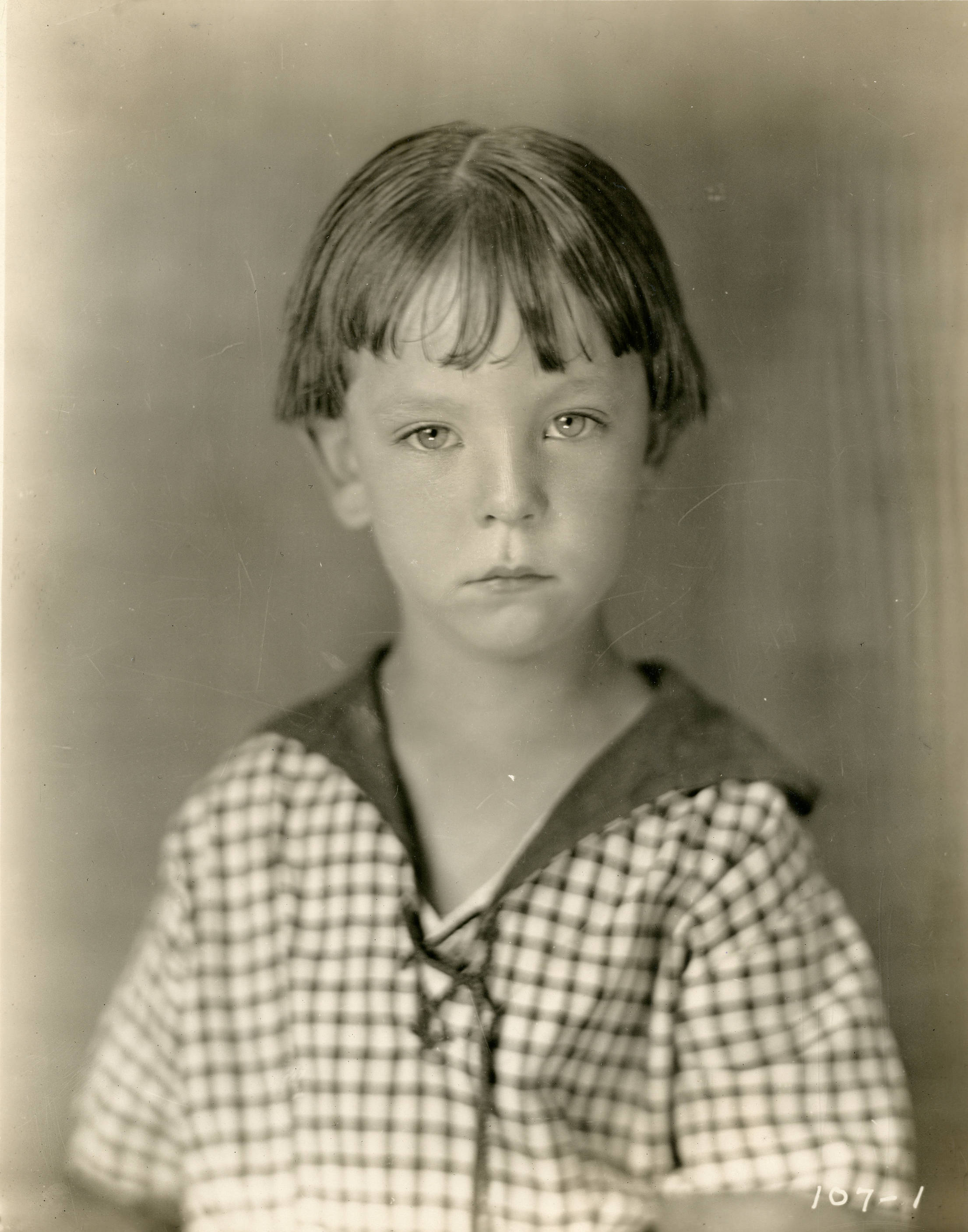
- Don Marion Davis c. 1922
- Born: October 9, 1917; Hollywood, California, U.S.
- Died: December 10, 2020 (aged 103); Tucson, Arizona, U.S.
- Occupation(s): Child actor of silent films, radio performer
- Years active: 1918–1925 (as a child actor)
- Family: Billy Armstrong (uncle)

Don Marion Davis (October 9, 1917 – December 10, 2020), professionally known as John Henry Jr. and Don Marion, was an American child actor of the silent film era, who, during a brief career in show business, appeared in several feature roles and comedy shorts in Hollywood screened between 1919 and 1925. He also had uncredited parts on the radio. He was one of the last surviving actors who worked in the silent film era.

== Biography ==
=== Entertainment career ===
He was born in Hollywood, California, on October 9, 1917, to Henry G. Davis and Helen Davis. He was discovered by studio entrepreneur and director Mack Sennett while he and his mother were visiting his uncle, British-born American actor and comedian Billy Armstrong around 1919. He was visiting the set of a film when the baby, who was originally cast, was not performing well. Davis then replaced him successfully.

In a 1920 newspaper article, he was described as one of the most famous child actors in the world. His feature-length films included Down on the Farm (1920) and A Small Town Idol (1921). He was often cast alongside the dog Teddy, who was one of the most well-known film animals of the era. By 1921, his films reportedly had to adjust to the fact that he was continuously growing.

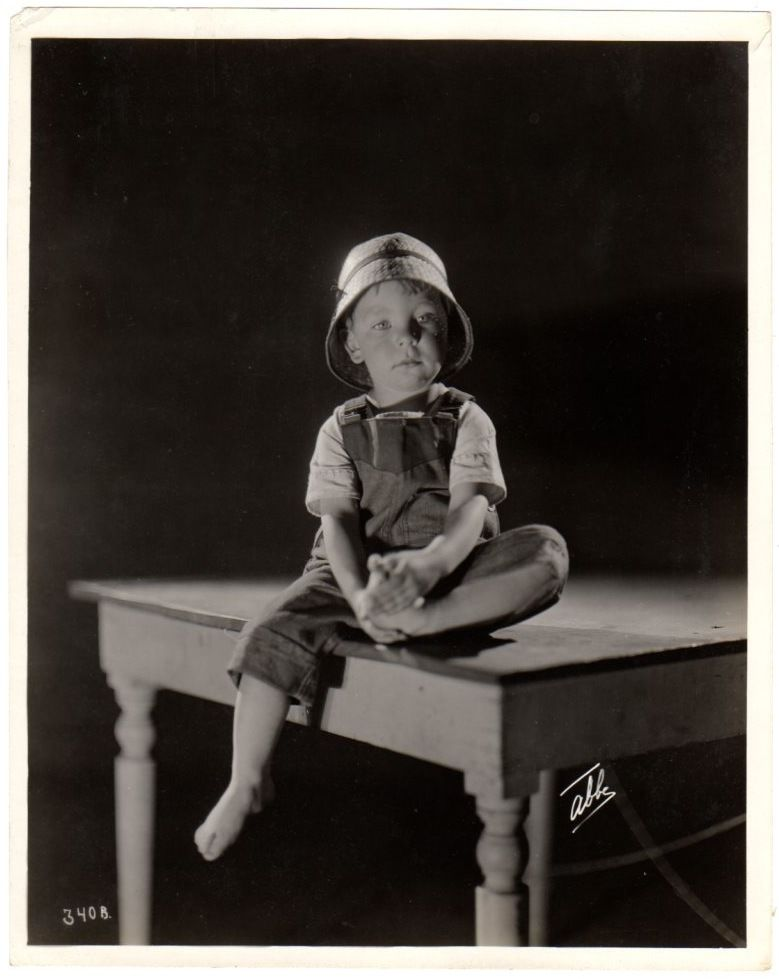
Don Marion aka John Henry Jr.

=== Post-entertainment career ===
After leaving the entertainment industry in 1925, he attended the University of Oregon and joined the U.S. Army in 1940, shortly prior to the United States entering World War II. He was stationed in Europe during this time as an infantry officer. After the war, he remained with the American military and held various positions in different countries, such as South Africa and South Korea. He graduated from the University of Arizona with a degree in Master of Public Administration.

He resided in Tucson, Arizona. At the age of 99, he was said to take daily bike rides for 40 minutes.

He was falsely reported as having died on March 2, 2012, in the 2013 book Obituaries in the Performing Arts, published by McFarland & Company and authored by Harris M. Lentz.

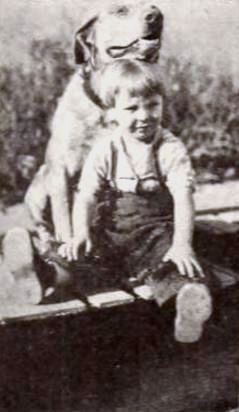
Marion in The Love Egg (1921)

Marion died of a brief illness at the Tucson Medical Center in Tucson, Arizona, on December 10, 2020, at the age of 103.

== Filmography (selected) ==
| Year | Title | Role |
|---|---|---|
| 1919 | Back to the Kitchen | The Baby |
| 1919 | His Last False Step | Minor role |
| 1920 | The Star Boarder | The boarding house owner's son |
| 1920 | Down on the Farm | The Baby |
| 1920 | Let 'er Go | The country girl's little brother |
| 1920 | By Golly! | Minor role |
| 1920 | Married Life | Child |
| 1920 | The Quack Doctor | The rich father's son |
| 1920 | It's a Boy | The child |
| 1920 | Bungalow Troubles | The son |
| 1921 | A Small Town Idol | Baby |
| 1921 | The Unhappy Finish | |
| 1921 | Made in the Kitchen | The Son |
| 1921 | Officer Cupid | The cook's son |
| 1921 | Astray from the Steerage | The immigrant child |
| 1921 | The Love Egg | |
| 1921 | Wanted, a Girl | |
| 1921 | A Rural Cinderella | |
| 1922 | Bow Wow | The country girl's baby brother |
| 1925 | Percy | Percival Rogeen, as a boy |
| 1925 | The Golden Princess | Tennessee Hunter (age 10) |
| 1925 | The Golden Bed | |

== Bibliography ==
- John Holmstrom, The Moving Picture Boy: An International Encyclopaedia from 1895 to 1995, Norwich, Michael Russell, 1996, p. 81.
