= Salome vs. Shenandoah =

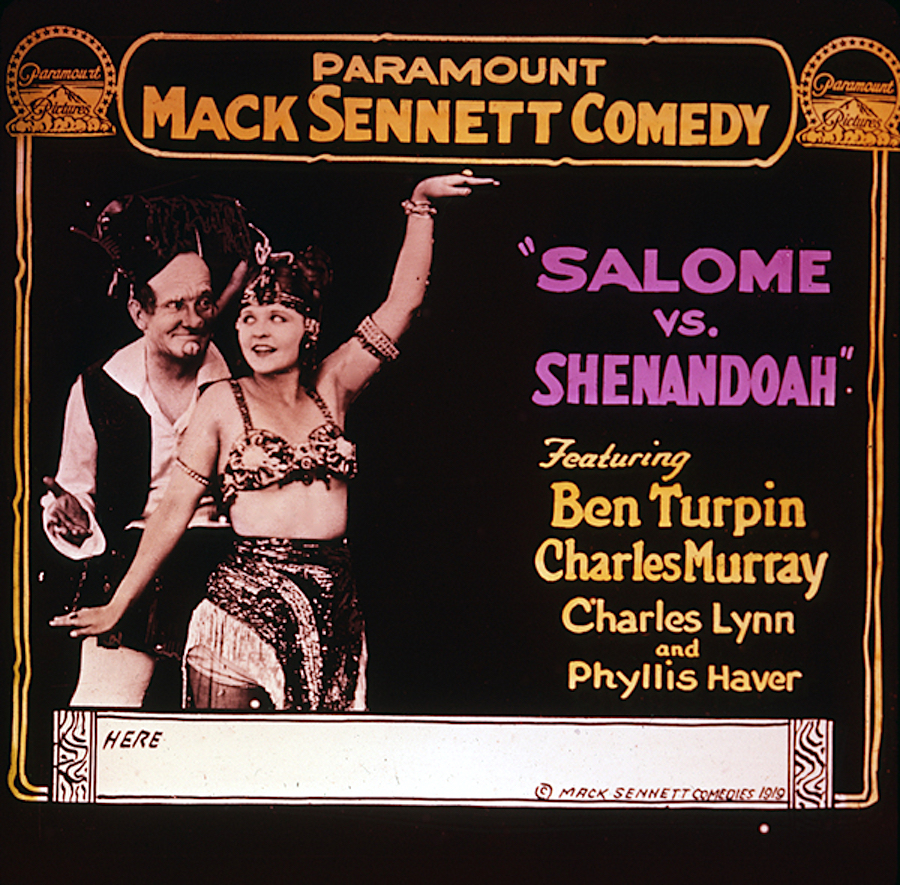
- Lantern slide
- Directed by: Ray Grey; Ray Hunt; Erle C. Kenton
- Produced by: Mack Sennett Comedies
- Starring: Ben Turpin
- Distributed by: Famous Players–Lasky; Paramount Pictures
- Release date: October 26, 1919
- Running time: 20 minutes
- Country: United States
- Language: Silent (English intertitles)

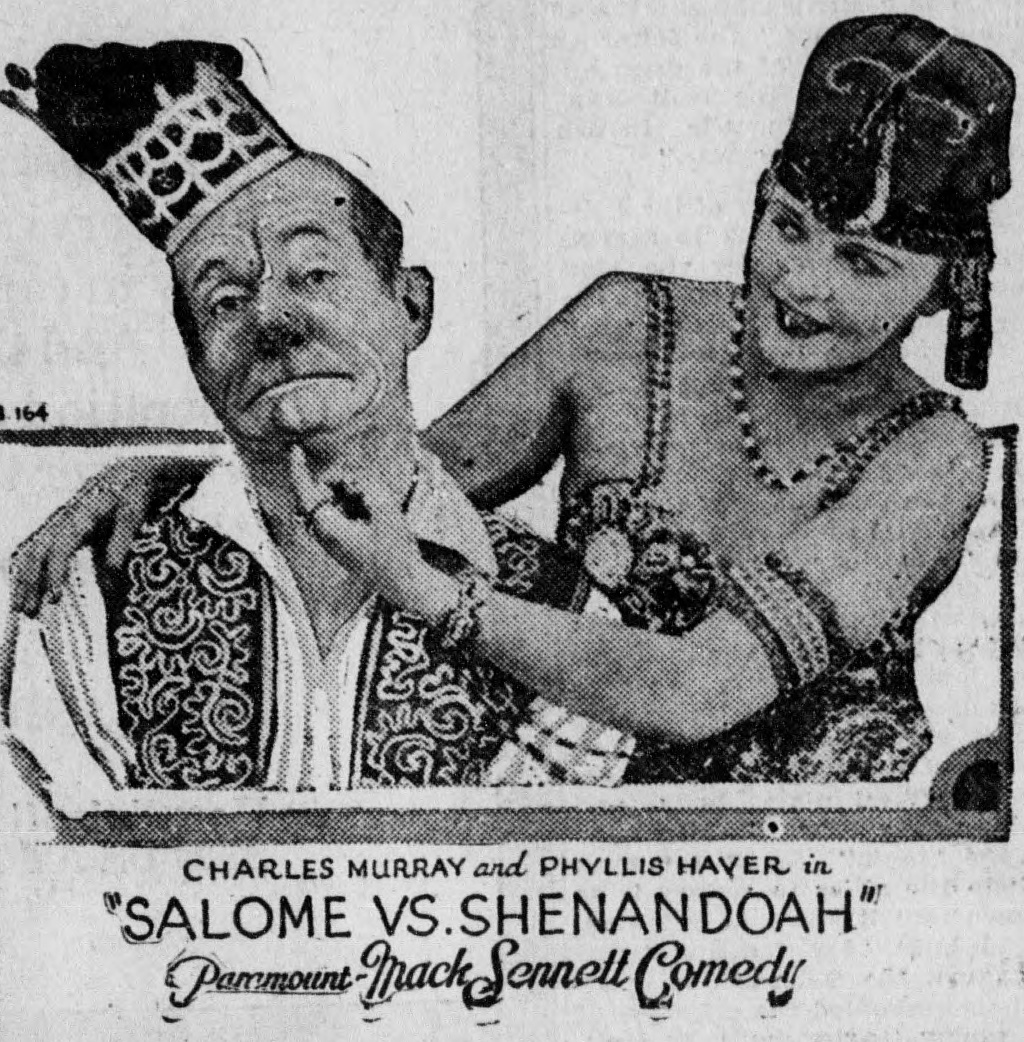
Newspaper publicity

Salome vs. Shenandoah is a 1919 American silent film comedy short directed by Ray Grey, Erle C. Kenton, and Ray Hunt. It starred Ben Turpin, Charles Murray, and Phyllis Haver. It was produced by Mack Sennett and distributed by Famous Players–Lasky and Paramount Pictures.

== Cast ==
- Ben Turpin as Actor Playing New General
- Charles Murray as Actor Playing Herod (credited as Charlie Murray)
- Phyllis Haver as Actress playing Salome
- Heinie Conklin as Actor Playing Captain of Artillery / Roman Slave (credited as Charles Conklin)
- Marie Prevost as Ingenue Actress
- Ford Sterling as Ingenue Actress's Father

unbilled

- Billy Bevan -
- Al Cooke -
- Annette DeGandis -
- Elva Diltz -
- Louise Fazenda - Minor Role (unconfirmed)
- Eddie Gribbon - Audience Spectator/A Soldier
- Harry Gribbon - Audience Spectator
- Harriet Hammond - (unconfirmed)
- George Jeske - Actor / Soldier
- Fanny Kelly - (unconfirmed)
- Patrick Kelly -
- Alice Maison -
- Kathryn McGuire -
- Bert Roach - Actor / Soldier
- Raymond Russell - Audience Spectator
- Sybil Seely - Minor Role
- Eva Thatcher - Audience Spectator
- Gladys Whitfield - Minor Role
