= The Ghost in the Garret =

1921 film

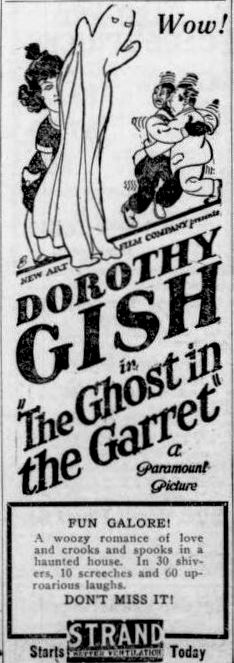
- Newspaper ad
- Directed by: F. Richard Jones
- Screenplay by: Fred Chaston; Wells Hastings
- Starring: Dorothy Gish; Downing Clarke; Mrs. David Landau; William Parke Jr. Ray Grey; Walter P. Lewis; Mary Foy
- Production companies: New Art Film Company; Famous Players–Lasky Corporation
- Distributed by: Paramount Pictures
- Release date: February 1921
- Running time: 50 minutes
- Country: United States
- Language: Silent (English intertitles)

The Ghost in the Garret is a 1921 American silent comedy film directed by F. Richard Jones and written by Fred Chaston and Wells Hastings. The film stars Dorothy Gish, Downing Clarke, Mrs. David Landau, William Parke Jr., Ray Grey, Walter P. Lewis, and Mary Foy. The film was released in February 1921, by Paramount Pictures. It is presumed to be a lost film. Dorothy Gish was the younger sister of the celebrated actress Lillian Gish, although she never became as popular as her sister.

== Plot ==
Delsie O'Gill visits the home of her aunt and uncle, during which time her aunt's $75,000 necklace is stolen. Delsie attempts to get back the necklace and traces it to a supposedly haunted house in the area. She pretends to be a ghost in order to frighten the thieves into giving up the necklace.

== Cast ==
- Dorothy Gish as Delsie O'Dell
- Downing Clarke as Gilbert Dennison
- Mrs. David Landau as Dennison's wife
- William Parke Jr. as Bill Clark
- Ray Grey as Oscar White
- Walter P. Lewis as Dennison's butler
- Mary Foy as Dennison's cook
- Frank Badgley as Det. O'Connor
- Frank Hagney as Crook
- Tom Blake as Crook
- William Nally as Crook
- Porter Strong as Crook

== Reviews ==
Critic Troy Howarth commented "Prolific silent film director F. Richard Jones was responsible for this stale old dark house comedy-thriller.....(the film) brought nothing new to the genre and seemed awfully clichéd to even 1921's critics....basically a lighthearted affair."
