= Troubles of a Bride =

1924 film

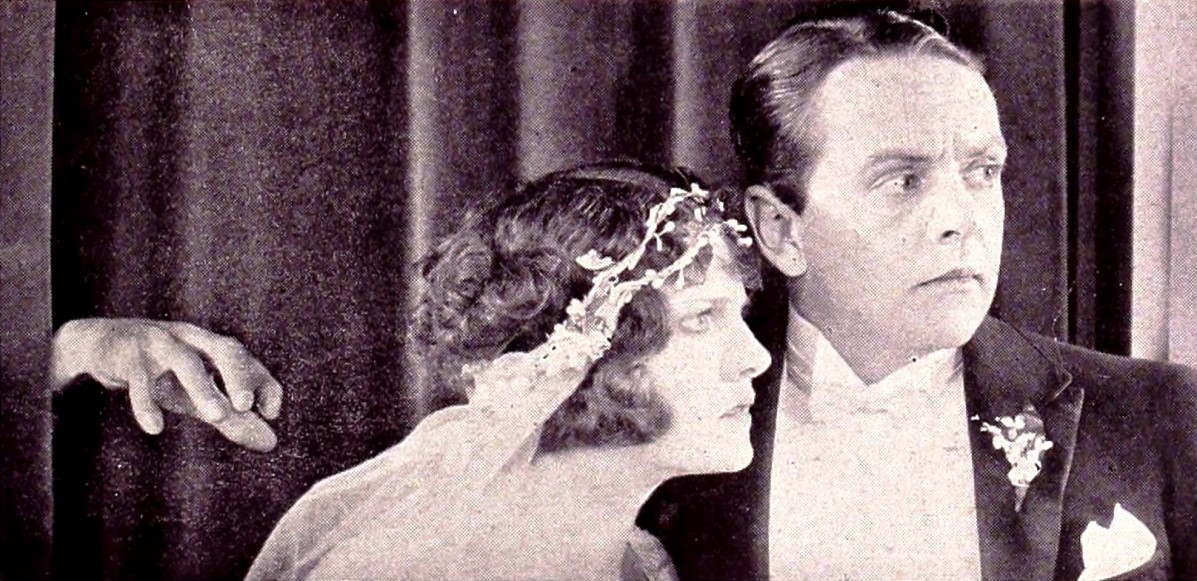
- Still with June and Agnew
- Directed by: Tom Buckingham
- Screenplay by: John Stone; Tom Buckingham
- Starring: Robert Agnew; Mildred June; Alan Hale Sr. Bruce Covington; Dolores Rousse; Heinie Conklin
- Production company: Fox Film Corporation
- Distributed by: Fox Film Corporation
- Release date: November 30, 1924
- Running time: 50 minutes
- Country: United States
- Language: Silent (English intertitles)

Troubles of a Bride is a 1924 American silent comedy film directed by Tom Buckingham and written by John Stone and Tom Buckingham. The film stars Robert Agnew, Mildred June, Alan Hale Sr., Bruce Covington, Dolores Rousse, and Heinie Conklin. The film was released on November 30, 1924, by the Fox Film Corporation.

== Plot ==
As described in a review in a film magazine, escaping from the police, the Baron (Hale), a clever crook, learns that Colonel Patterson (Covington) plans to remodel his house to surprise his daughter Mildred (June) who is about to marry Robert Wallace. Impersonating the architect, he gains an entrée and finds the money supposed to be hidden in the house, but also determines to marry Mildred. He arranges a plot with her to kidnap her just before the wedding to test Robert’s love, as she has seen him kissing a vamp. The scheme works, but the Baron soon discloses his real purpose and attacks her. Robert comes to the rescue and there is a wild ride on a runaway train with Robert chasing it in a locomotive and rescuing Mildred just as the train is about to plunge into the river. Mildred is satisfied and accepts the Baron’s explanation when, realizing he is beaten, he declares it was all a part of the plan.

== Cast ==
- Robert Agnew as Robert Wallace
- Mildred June as Mildred Patterson
- Alan Hale Sr. as Gordon Blake, the Baron
- Bruce Covington as Colonel Patterson
- Dolores Rousse as Vera
- Heinie Conklin as Jeff
- Lew Harvey as Chauffeur
- Bud Jamison as Architect
- Jack Kenny as Minor Role (uncredited)

== Production ==
Consistent with the practice at that time, the comic role of the servant Jeff was played by Conklin in blackface. The use of white actors in blackface for black character roles in Hollywood films did not begin to decline until the late 1930s, and is now considered highly offensive, disrespectful, and racist.

== Preservation ==
With no prints of Troubles of a Bride located in any film archives, it is a lost film.
