= The Knockout Kid =

1925 film directed by Albert S. Rogell

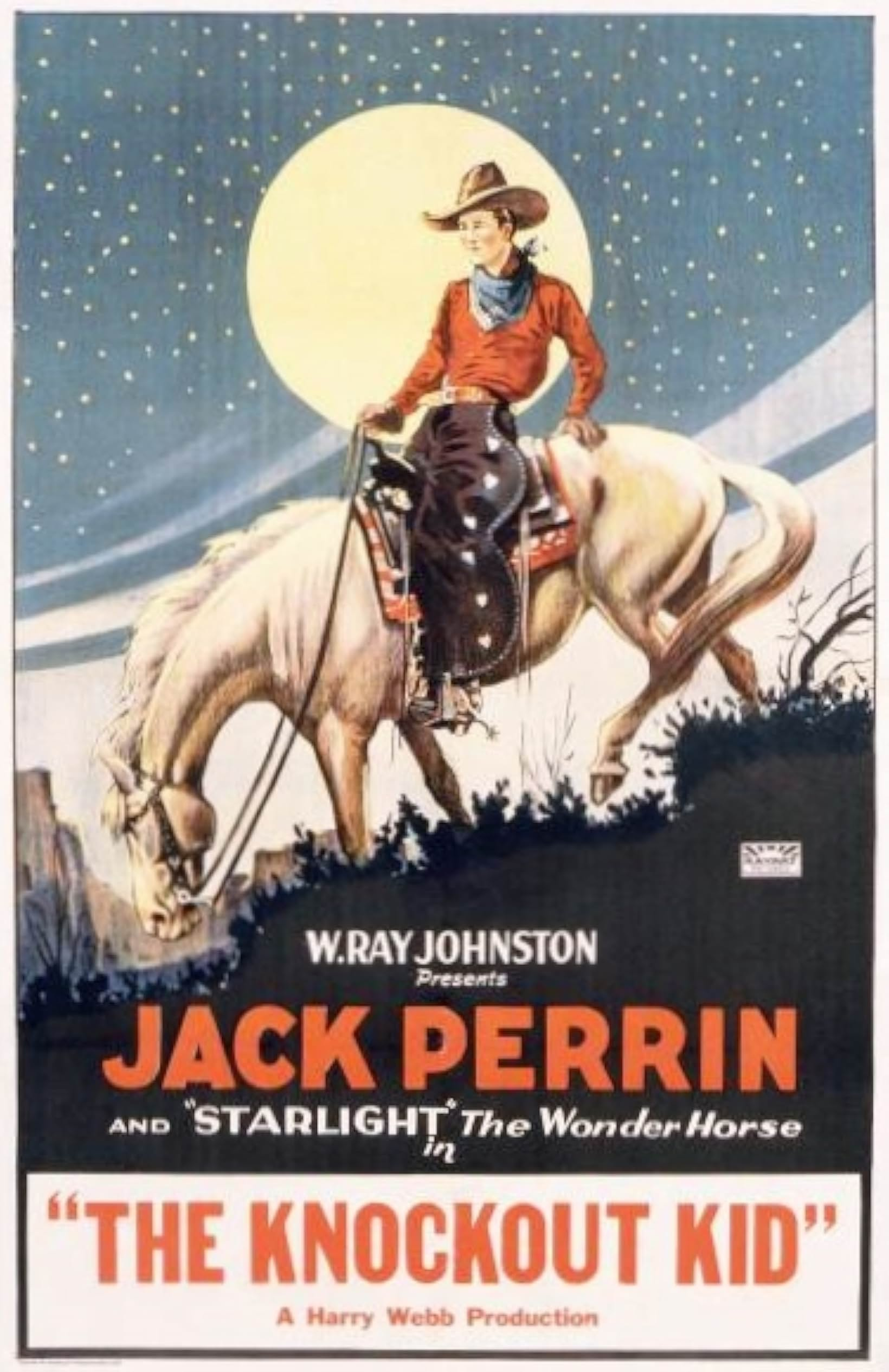
- Directed by: Albert S. Rogell
- Written by: Forrest Sheldon
- Produced by: W. Ray Johnston; Harry S. Webb
- Starring: Jack Perrin; Molly Malone; Eva Thatcher
- Production company: Harry Webb Productions
- Distributed by: Rayart Pictures
- Release date: September 1, 1925
- Running time: 5 reels
- Country: United States
- Language: Silent (English intertitles)

The Knockout Kid is a 1925 American silent Western comedy film directed by Albert S. Rogell and starring Jack Perrin, Molly Malone, and Eva Thatcher.

== Plot ==
As described in a film magazine review, Jack is the son of a millionaire, and keen on amateur boxing. He knocks out “One Round” Sweeney in a bout at an athletic club and is denounced by his father. He is disinherited and goes to Texas in his Packard car, accompanied by his dog and valet Snowball. His car and clothes are stolen and he is about to be hung for “rustling” cattle, of which he is innocent. The only thing that can save him is marriage with the Widow Jenkins who owns the cattle ranch. He clears his name, however, and marries the widow's cute niece Jenny instead.

== Cast ==
- Jack Perrin as Jack Lanning
- Molly Malone as Jenny Jenkins
- Eva Thatcher as Widow Jenkins
- Bud Osborne as Piute Sam
- Martin Turner as Snowball, a valet
- Edward Burns as Ranch Foreman
- Jack Richardson as Assistant Foreman
- Buzz Barton
