= Lillian Lawrence =

American actress (1868–1926)

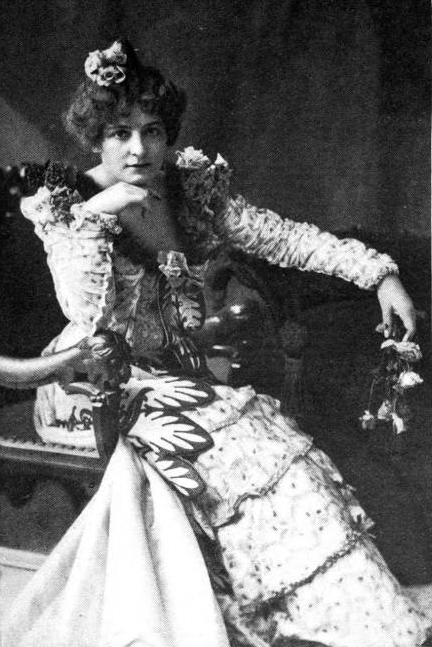
- Lawrence in 1899
- Born: February 17, 1868; Alexandria, Virginia, U.S.
- Died: May 7, 1926 (aged 58); Beverly Hills, California, U.S.
- Resting place: Hollywood Forever Cemetery
- Occupation: Actress
- Children: Ethel Grey Terry

Lillian Lawrence (February 17, 1868 – May 7, 1926) was an American theatre and silent film actress. Her daughter Ethel Grey Terry was also an actress.

== Biography ==
Lawrence was born in either Alexandria, Virginia or Alexander, West Virginia but moved to San Francisco at the age of two. She made her stage debut there as a 13-year-old girl as a chess piece in the operetta The Royal Middy. Following that, she sang opera for the California Theatre for three years. At age 20, she joined a touring company, followed by a role in The Two Orphans. Afterwards, she joined a repertory theatre in Oakland.

In 1882 at the age of 14, she gave birth to her daughter Ethel, but Lawrence remained unmarried.

In 1892, she moved to New York City and then back to Dayton, Ohio the next year. She then won the lead role in a production of The Two Orphans with Kate Claxton. Lawrence returned to New York, followed by a position with the National Theatre Stock Company in Washington, D.C., then had Shakespearean roles with Thomas W. Keene.

In 1897, she joined the Castle Square Theatre stock company, another repertory theatre. As stock theatres often put on new plays on a weekly basis, by summer 1897, she had taken on over 300 operatic and 500 dramatic roles over the course of her career. She spent six years with the company and was known as the company's "Leading Lady". Her popularity was such that when she temporarily left the group in 1901 on a 16-month sabbatical, she received a rousing ovation and tribute.

Lawrence returned to San Francisco in 1904, joining the repertory at the Alcazar Theatre and becoming immediately popular. After a short period in Portland, Oregon, she returned to the East Coast with the Orpheum Dramatic Stock Theatre at the Chestnut Street Theatre in Philadelphia, and the Harry Davis Stock Players at the Grand Theatre in Pittsburgh. She also returned to Boston to play with John Craig Stock Company at the Globe Theatre, Boston, made special appearances with the Castle Square Company, She appeared in Broadway plays as well; including playing Grandma, "the Demon", in His Majesty Bunker Bean in 1916 at the Astor Theatre.

She joined Ethel in Los Angeles in 1919 and appeared in both films and theatre while there. Lawrence died of heart disease in 1926 at her daughter's home in Beverly Hills. Her ashes are interred at Hollywood Forever Cemetery.

== Partial filmography ==
- The Galley Slave (1915)
- A Fallen Idol (1919)
- The Social Pirate (1919)
- Black Is White (1920)
- A Parisian Scandal (1921)
- A Girl's Desire (1922)
- East Is West (1922)
- White Shoulders (1922)
- The Voice from the Minaret (1923)
- Fashionable Fakers (1923)
- The Common Law (1923)
- Three Ages (1923)
- Crinoline and Romance (1923)
- Christine of the Hungry Heart (1924)
- Graustark (1925)
- Stella Maris (1925)
