= Ray Grey =

American film director and actor (1890–1925)

Raymond Standish Grey (February 19, 1890 – April 18, 1925) was an American film director, actor, screenwriter. He was the father of actress Virginia Grey.

== Life ==
Grey was born in San Diego, California.

Grey got his start as an actor in Mack Sennett's Keystone Studios films. His acting debut was in A Movie Star (1916). In the early 1920s, he switched off between being the main director of features and being a second unit or assistant director; such as with the film Molly O' (1921), Flickering Youth (1924), and Salome and Shenandoah.

He primary directed films Among Those Present (1919), Andy Takes a Flyer (1925), and Between Meals (1926). The last film was released after Grey's early death at age 35 from pneumonia in Glendale, California. Grey is buried at Forest Lawn in Glendale.

== Filmography ==
Director (16 credits)

- 1926 Hired and Fired (Short) (as Raymond Grey)
- 1926 The Only Son (Short) (as Raymond Grey)
- 1926 Pay the Cashier (Short) (as Raymond Grey)
- 1926 Soft Pedal (Short) (as Raymond Grey)
- 1926 Don't Butt In (Short) (as Raymond Grey)
- 1926 Between Meals (Short) (as Raymond Grey)
- 1925 Andy Takes a Flyer (Short)
- 1922 The Sleuth (Short) (as Raymond Grey)
- 1922 Homemade Movies (Short) (as Ray Gray)
- 1922 Stand Pat (Short) (as Raymond Grey)
- 1922 Loose Change (Short) (as Raymond Grey)
- 1922 Try, Try Again (Short) (as Raymond Grey)
- 1920 Down on the Farm (as Ray Gray)
- 1919 A Lady's Tailor (Short)
- 1919 Salome vs. Shenandoah (Short)
- 1919 Among Those Present (Short)

Actor (6 credits)

- 1924 Flickering Youth (Short), Attorney August Gale
- 1924 The Hollywood Kid (Short), Sheik Star
- 1923 The Shriek of Araby, Arab Prince
- 1921 The Ghost in the Garret, Oscar White
- 1917 His Rise and Tumble (Short)
- 1916 A Movie Star (Short), Jack's Screen Rival

Second Unit Director or Assistant Director (8 credits)

- 1924 Flickering Youth (Short) (assistant director)
- 1923 Suzanna (assistant director)
- 1922 The Crossroads of New York (assistant director)
- 1921 Molly O' (assistant director)
- 1920 By Golly! (Short) (assistant director - as Ray Gray)
- 1917 His Parlor Zoo (Short) (assistant director)
- 1917 A Tuner of Note (Short) (assistant director)
- 1917 His Rise and Tumble (Short) (assistant director)

Writer (1 credit)

- 1920 Down on the Farm (as Ray Gray)
