= Ben Corday =

American actor (1875–1938)

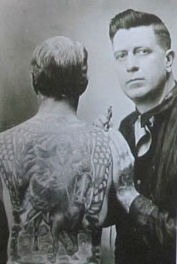
- Ben Corday (right) displaying an Annie Oakley backpiece on D.E. Warford (left)
- Born: 1875; Uncertain
- Died: February 20, 1938 (aged 62–63); Los Angeles, California
- Other name: Big Ben Corday
- Occupations: Tattoo artist, Actor, Sailor, Wrestler

Ben Corday (1875–1938) was an American tattoo artist and actor. He is known for being a prolific tattoo flash artist and a progenitor of modern tattooing.

== Life ==
Ben Corday was born in 1875. Corday told a variety of stories about his life, so some biographical details are uncertain. While his obituary listed Singapore as his place of birth, he told another newspaper that he was born in Lucknow, India, and a historian found records that he was born in Lancashire, England. A British subject, Corday said he began a life at sea when he ran away at the age of 14 to work on a sailing ship. Corday's obituary said he joined the Royal Marine Corps and then the Scots Guards (part of the British Army), for whom he fought in the Second Boer War in South Africa. A historian determined that he did serve in the British Army. After leaving the military, Corday relocated to the United States, where he applied for citizenship in 1912. Afterward, Corday found work as a sideshow attraction in the Sells Floto Circus. A wrestler and actor, he appeared in two silent short films directed by Hal Roach.

A man of many trades, Ben Corday was mainly known for his career in tattooing, which he practiced after immigrating to the United States. Corday lived and tattooed in several locations, including San Francisco, New York City, Australia and Los Angeles. What is known about Corday's tattooing career is primarily from the stories passed down by his peers. His mentee, American tattooer Bert Grimm, relayed several of these to San Francisco tattooer Lyle Tuttle. In these stories, Grimm portrayed Corday as both a prolific artist and notorious alcoholic who would sell off entire sets of tattoo flash before going on a drinking binge. When his funds were depleted, Corday would produce new art work and reopen his shop. Corday eventually settled in Los Angeles, where he tattooed on Main Street. He died in his sleep at his residence on nearby Hewitt Street in February 1938.

== Impact ==
Corday was an influential tattoo artist and flash designer whose work is considered foundational to the era of modern tattooing. The Japanese-influenced style of Corday's designs, known for fine line work and subtle shading integrated with Western elements, was shared by contemporaries like George Burchett. Corday's name was known and highly regarded among American tattooers such as Bert Grimm, Sailor Jerry, and Don Ed Hardy. Corday's abundant flash, much of which he sold to tattooer Percy Waters, is widely circulated and continues to influence tattoo design.

== Height ==
While it is certain that Ben Corday was an imposingly large man, his actual height is of some dispute. An article published during Corday's stint in New York as a doorman declares his height to be 7 foot 5 inches and his weight 315 pounds. Corday's obituary in the Los Angeles Times lists him at 6 foot 10 inches and just under 300 pounds. Corday, when filling out his application for U.S. citizenship, reported his height at 6 foot 8 inches.
