= Century Film Corporation =

Defunct American film studio

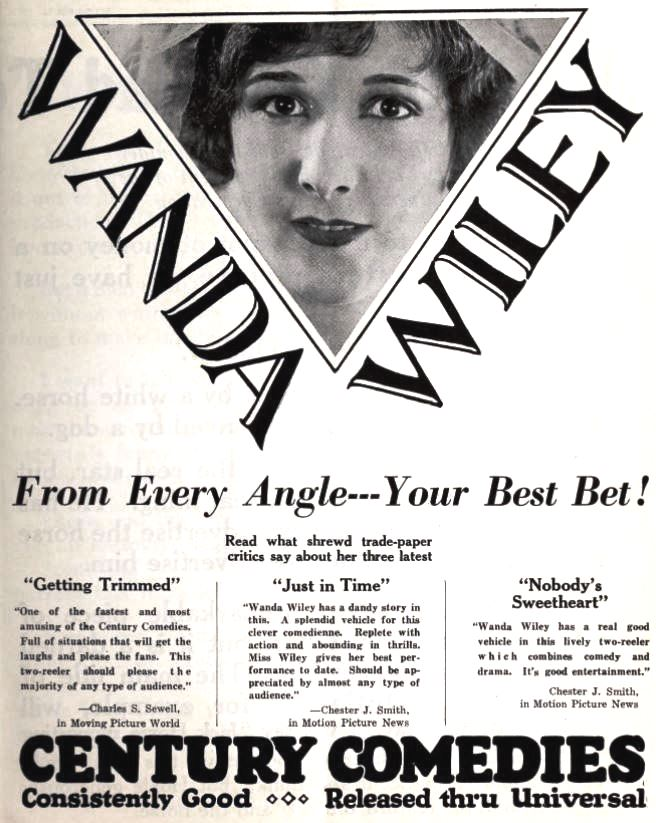
Advertisement for films with Wanda Wiley

Century Film Corporation was a producer of low budget two-reel films in the United States featuring animals, child performers, and comedy acts. It shared a former Universal Studios lot with LKO and released through Universal.

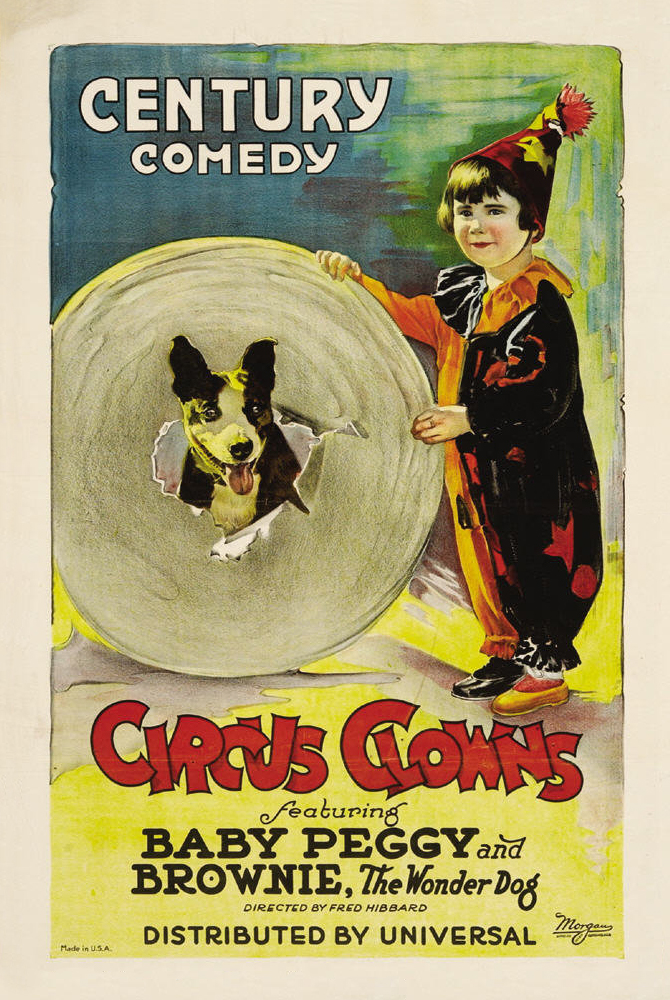
Circus Clowns 1922 poster

Diana Serra Cary, known as Baby Peggy made over 150 short films for the Century Film Corporation between 1921 and 1924. Baby Peggy; The Elephant in the Room is a 2012 about her films and career.

Julius Stern was president and general manager. Abe Stern was secretary and treasurer. Louis Jacobs was studio manager. The studio's directors were Fred Fishback, William Watson, and Tom Buckingham. Harry Sweet Charles Doroty H. M. Herbel was sales manager. Sig Neufeld was production manager. Animal trainers were employed.

Wanda Wiley Comedies, Buster Brown Comedies based on the newspaper comic strip, and Edna Marian Comedies were produced by the studio.

Buddy Messinger was in some of its comedy films.

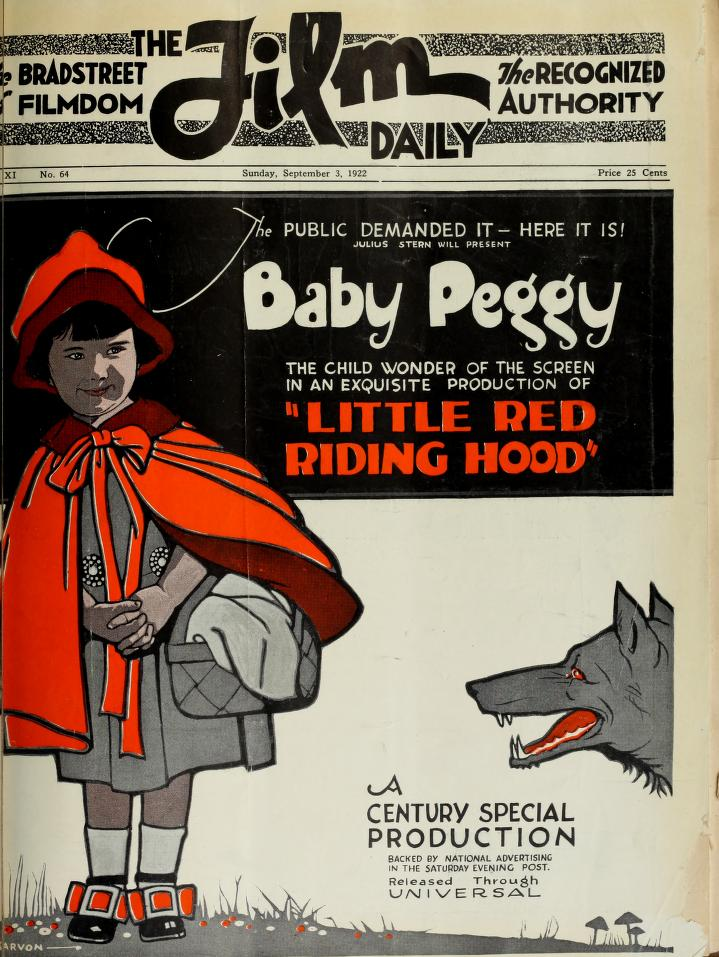
1922

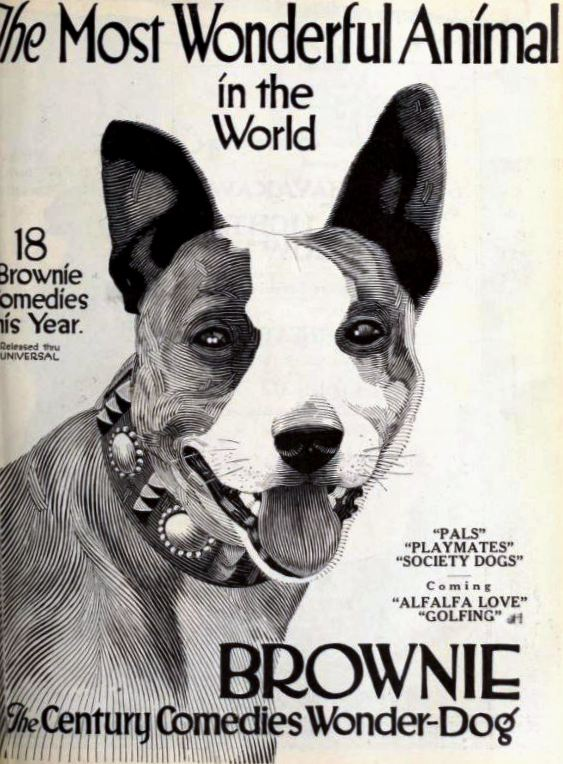

Carl Laemmle started Yankee Film Company with his brothers-in-law the Stern brothers. It soon developed into the Independent Moving Pictures. In February 1924, Spec O'Donnell signed with Julius and Abe Stern's Century Film Corporation. Brownie the Wonder Dog appeared in its films. Wanda Wiley had a contract with the studio. James Berry acted in Century Films

Betty May and Johnny Fox (comedian) acted in Century Films.

Century Film Corporation studio burned in 1926. Beno Rubel, company secretary, toured the damage.

== Filmography ==
- My Salomy Lions (1920)
- Brownie's Little Venus (1921)
- Circus Clowns directed by Fred Hibbard
- Little Red Riding Hood
- Taxi! Taxi! (1924) written and directed by Noel M. Smith and starring Al Alt, Harry McCoy, and Jack Earle
