= Carmen Jr. =

1923 film

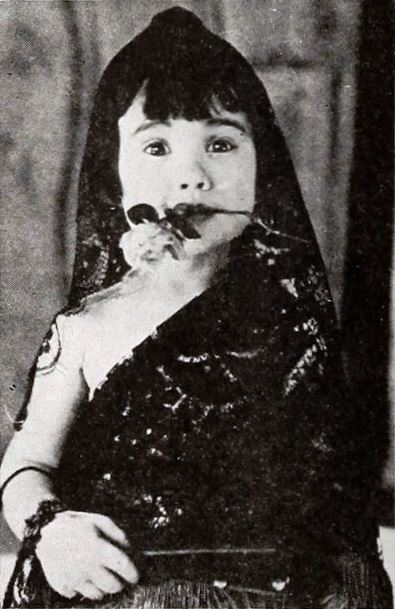
- Baby Peggy
- Directed by: Alfred J. Goulding
- Written by: Joe Farnham
- Starring: Baby Peggy
- Production company: Century Film Corporation
- Distributed by: Universal Film
- Release date: 1923
- Running time: 2 reels
- Country: United States
- Language: Silent (English intertitles)

Carmen Jr. is a 1923 American silent short comedy film starring Baby Peggy and directed by Alfred J. Goulding. The film is about 11 minutes in length. A foreign copy of the film exists with English subtitles.

== Plot ==
According to the copyright description, Peggy has a hot dog concession in Mexico that she operates on wheels with her faithful dog as the motive power to take her from place to place as the condition of business demands. One of the gendarmes does not like not being allowed to eat his fill of “hotdogs” and tries to make things unpleasant for Peggy.

In eluding him she hides beneath the wide skirt of a senorita and is led into a cafe where a young boy is giving an exhibition dance. Peggy decides to show them how a real dancer looks and, amid loud applause, trips the light fantastic all around the room.

She next decides to become a vamp and succeeds in vamping several of the hard-hearted senors so that they do anything she commands, even to pounding their heads with a hammer. Her first victim gets wise to her and warns the others. They chase her for some time, but she finally gives them the slip and returns to her stand. She still has the vamp bug, however, and vamps her next customer, but pulls stakes and leaves him flat at the crucial moment."
