= Captain January (1924 film) =

1924 film by Edward F. Cline

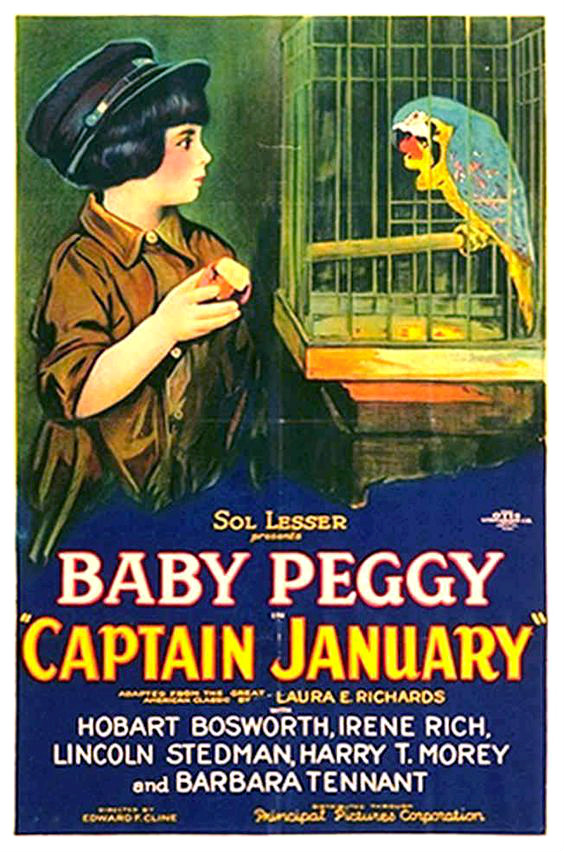
- Theatrical release poster for Captain January.
- Directed by: Edward F. Cline
- Written by: Eve Unsell; John Grey
- Based on: Captain January; 1890 novel by Laura E. Richards
- Produced by: Sol Lesser
- Starring: Baby Peggy; Hobart Bosworth; Irene Rich
- Cinematography: Glen MacWilliams
- Distributed by: Principal Pictures
- Release date: July 6, 1924
- Running time: 64 minutes
- Country: United States
- Language: Silent (English intertitles)

Captain January is a 1924 American silent drama film directed by Edward F. Cline and featuring child star Baby Peggy. It was the first screen adaptation of the 1890 children's book Captain January by Laura E. Richards. The other adaptation of the novel was the film Captain January (1936) with Shirley Temple.

Captain January (1924)

== Plot ==
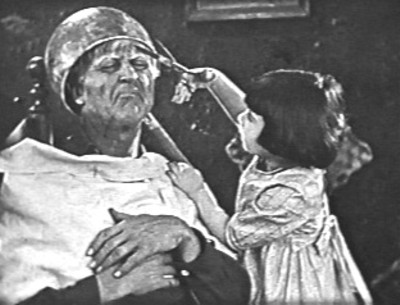
Baby Peggy and Hobart Bosworth in a scene from the film.

Captain January is a young girl who lives in a lighthouse in Maine with her guardian, Jeremiah "Daddy" Judkins. Judkins, who is the lighthouse keeper, rescued January from a shipwreck when she was an infant. The only clue to the baby's identity was a locket with a photograph of a woman around her neck, so Judkins adopted her as his own daughter.

January helps Judkins with his tasks around the lighthouse. As Judkins' heart begins to fail and his health worsens, these tasks become increasingly more complicated and important. In one instance, January must ascend to the top of the lighthouse by herself to light the lamps. The local townsfolk become skeptical of Judkins' ability to care for the girl, and try to have her taken away.

January is saved from the orphanage by a chance meeting with Isabelle Morton, an affluent young woman who comes to visit the lighthouse. She believes that January looks familiar; when she sees the photograph in the locket, she identifies January as her late sister's child.

Isabelle wishes to adopt January and reunite her with her blood relatives. Faced with his poor health and the scrutiny of the townspeople, Judkins agrees. However, the girl is miserable in her new surroundings, runs away, and finds her way back to the lighthouse. Judkins and the Morton family finally devise a means to make everyone happy: January returns to the Mortons, and Judkins is employed on the family's yacht, ensuring that he will always be able to visit his former daughter.

== Cast ==
- Hobart Bosworth as Jeremiah Judkins
- Baby Peggy as Captain January
- Irene Rich as Isabelle Morton
- Lincoln Stedman as Bob Peet
- Harry T. Morey as George Maxwell
- Barbara Tennant as Lucy Tripp
- John Merkyl as Herbert Morton
- Emmett King as Rev. John Elliott
- Rosa Gore as Gossip (uncredited)
- Joseph North as Butler (uncredited)

== Reception ==
The film was released to mostly positive reception, with a reviewer from Motion Picture Classic stating "Under appreciative direction, [she behaves] like any normal active six-year old kid... She is natural -- not a bit precocious -- and acts with a sincerity that should be adopted by many of her adult contemporaries."

== Preservation ==
Captain January is one of only six of Baby Peggy's full-length feature films to survive to the current era. It has been preserved in several film archives around the world, including the Library of Congress in the United States. The film has also been restored and made available to the public by independent silent film dealers.

== See also ==
- Captain January - the 1936 Shirley Temple version of the novel
- Captain January - the 1890 novel
