= Straphanger (disambiguation) =

Straphanger may mean:

== Transit passengers ==
- Straphanger (specifically), a standing passenger on a subway or bus
- Straphanger (more generally), a commuter who uses public transportation

== Other uses ==
- Straphangers Campaign, a New York City-based transit interest group
- The Straphanger, a 1922 comedy short film directed by Fred Fishback
- The Straphanger Saloon, a saloon in Hackensack, New Jersey
- Straphanger, an experienced United States Army airborne paratrooper who is not scheduled to jump today but is on standby
