= Captain January (novel) =

1891 novel by Laura E. Richards

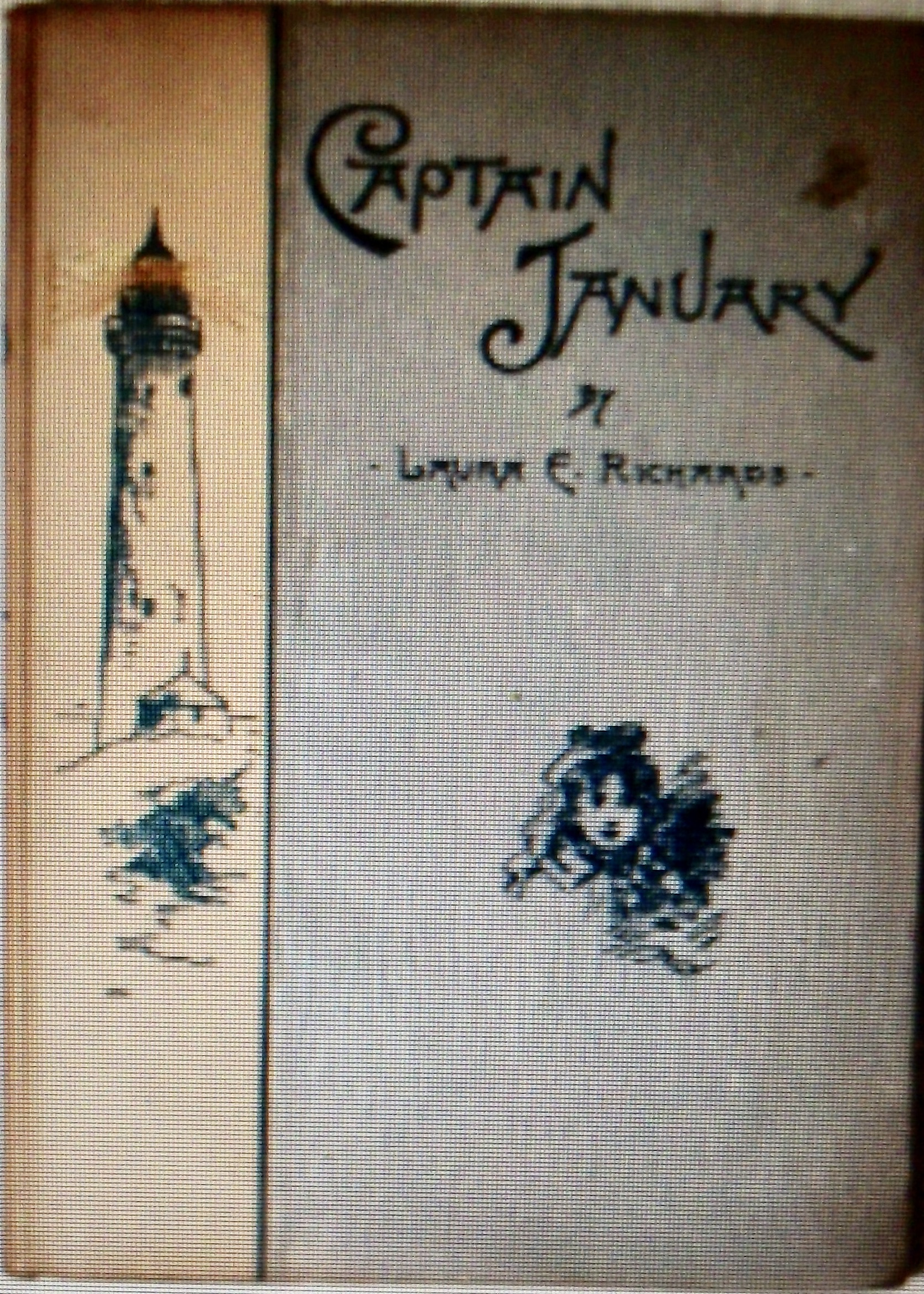
- Book cover of 1890 1st edition
- Author: Laura E. Richards
- Language: English
- Genre: children's literature
- Publisher: Estes & Lauriat
- Publication date: 1891
- Publication place: United States

Captain January is an 1891 children's novel, about a lighthouse keeper and his adopted daughter, written by Laura E. Richards. First published by Estes & Lauriat in Boston, it was also published in Montreal, Quebec, Canada, and London, England. There have been two film adaptions of the novel, the 1924 silent film Captain January, starring Baby Peggy and the 1936 musical film Captain January, starring Shirley Temple.

== Plot summary ==
Ten-year-old Star Bright learned about her past, and that of her Daddy Captain, from the stories Captain January told her.

Januarius Judkins (the captain's birth name) had run off to sea as a young boy and worked his way up to being ship's captain. His last vessel was destroyed in a cyclone, and the captain was shipwrecked on a desert island. He spent five years on the island with a shipmate, then ten years alone after the mate died. After the captain had been rescued he couldn't get used to being around people, so he became a lighthouse keeper on an island off the coast of Maine.

He lived in solitude until a gale-induced shipwreck occurred on the lighthouse island's rocky coast, and the only survivor was a baby girl. The next day Captain January sent for the minister to give a proper burial to the bodies he recovered, but refused to give up the baby he named Star Bright. He was sure the Lord wanted him to raise her.

Captain January obtained a milk cow named Imogen, and later asked the minister for a couple of books to use in educating his girl. He was given the Bible, plus a book of Shakespeare's plays, and they became Star's only school books.

Other than the minister, who occasionally checked up on Star and the captain, the only person encouraged to visit the lighthouse was quiet Bob Peet, the young pilot of the steamer Huntress that regularly went past the island. Captain January liked Bob because he could "belay his jaw" and sit for hours without speaking. One day Bob came by for a visit, and admitted he wasn't on the Huntress because he'd run her aground on the sand during a thick fog. All aboard would have to wait until high tide before finishing their journey.

With the captain's approval Bob rowed Star close to the grounded steamer. A lady passenger saw the girl, and was shocked by the resemblance to her sister, who'd been lost at sea, along with her husband and baby, ten years ago. The next day the minister was rowed to the island to tell Captain January that wealthy Mrs. Morton was sure Star was her niece, Isabel Maynard, and wanted to have the girl come live with her. In an hour's time Bob Peet would row Mr. and Mrs. Morton to the lighthouse. The captain was heartbroken, but thought it might be the Lord's will for Star to live in a better home.

When Mr. and Mrs. Morton arrived the captain declared his lighthouse island to be "Good anchorage for a shipwrecked mariner like me, but no place for ladies or – or them as belongs to ladies." When Star was asked to go off with her relatives she replied that they could kill her and take away her body, but she would never leave when she was alive. Mrs. Morton left her niece with the lighthouse captain.

On Christmas Day Bob Peet came with pockets filled with candy and oranges, plus he brought a large box containing presents and a letter from Star's aunt. When Star took her gifts up to her bedroom Captain January told Bob that the Lord was letting him know that he would soon receive his "final sailing orders" and Star needed to be taken care of. The captain would fly a blue pennant as a signal, and when Bob went past as pilot of the Huntress he would look for that pennant, and if he saw it he'd know all was well. When the time came that Bob didn't see the signal pennant he was to tell the steamer's captain to send a telegram to Mr. and Mrs. Morton, and Bob was to row to the lighthouse and comfort Star.

Several months later the captain felt his body grow cold and numb, and he told Star to go down to the island's shore and wave as the Huntress went by. He said Bob Peet might be stopping by that day, and she was to wait for him to come ashore. After Star left Captain January used the last of his strength to lower the blue pennant, then he sat down and waited to die.

== Sequel ==
A sequel to Captain January, Star Bright, was written by Laura E. Richards and published by L. C. Page & Co in 1927. It tells of Star Bright, now called by her birth name of Isabel Maynard, and her life with fashionable people. In the end she returns to her beloved lighthouse and marries Bob Peet, who is now the lighthouse keeper.

== Selected editions ==
- Estes & Lauriat (Boston), 1890
- W. Foster Brown & Co. (Montreal, Canada), 1890
- Gay and Bird (London, England), 1891
- Random (New York) Anthologized in The Shirley Temple Treasury (Random, 1959) with The Little Colonel, Rebecca of Sunnybrook Farm and Heidi.
