= Diana Serra Cary =

American child film actress and film historian (1918–2020)

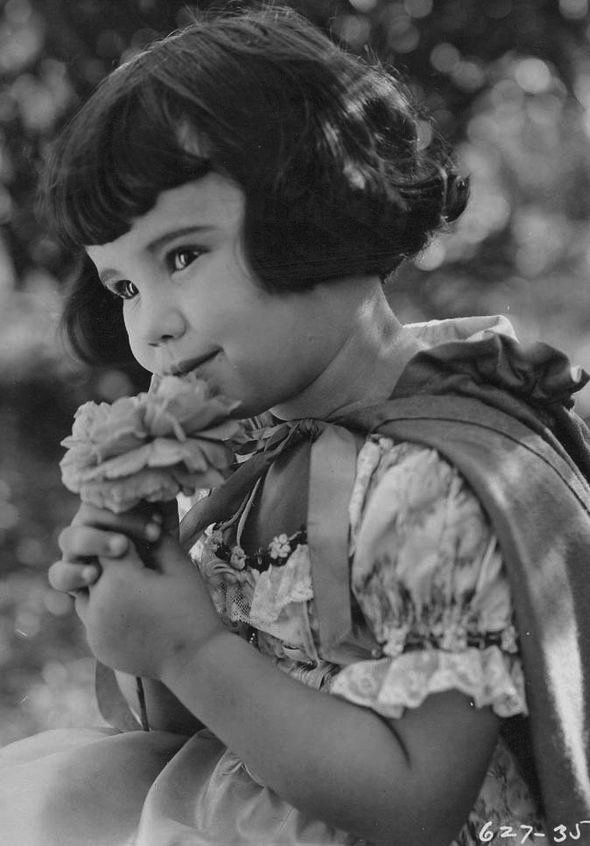
- Baby Peggy, c. 1922
- Born: Peggy-Jean Montgomery; October 29, 1918; San Diego, California, U.S.
- Died: February 24, 2020 (aged 101); Gustine, California, U.S.
- Other names: Baby Peggy; Baby Peggy Montgomery; Peggy Montgomery; Peggy Jane; Diana Ayres
- Education: Lawlor Professional School; Fairfax High School
- Occupations: Actress; vaudevillian; author; silent film historian
- Years active: 1920–1938; 2013
- Spouses: Gordon Ayres (m. 1938; div. 1948) Bob Cary (m. 1954; died 2001)
- Children: 1

Diana Serra Cary (born Peggy-Jean Montgomery; October 29, 1918 – February 24, 2020), known as Baby Peggy, was an American child film actress, vaudevillian, author and silent film historian. She was the last surviving person with a substantial career in silent films.

Baby Peggy was one of the three major American child stars of the Hollywood silent film era along with Jackie Coogan and Baby Marie. Between 1921 and 1924, she made over 150 short films for the Century Film Corporation. In 1922, she received over 1.2 million fan letters and by 1924, she had been dubbed "The Million Dollar Baby" for her $1.5 million annual salary ($28.2 million in 2025). Despite her childhood fame and wealth, her parents mismanaged her finances and by the time she came of age she found herself poor and working as an extra by the 1930s.

Having an interest in both writing and history since her youth, Montgomery found a second career as an author and silent film historian in her later years under the name Diana Serra Cary. She was the author of several books including her historical novel The Drowning of the Moon. She was also an advocate for child actors' rights.

== Early life ==
She was born on October 29, 1918, in San Diego, California as Peggy-Jean Montgomery, the second daughter of Marian (née Baxter) and Jack Montgomery. While some sources incorrectly give her birth name as Margaret, Cary herself, in her autobiography, notes that she was indeed born as Peggy-Jean. She further explained the Roman Catholic nuns at her birth hospital recommended the name Margaret as Peggy was a pagan name. Her parents rejected the suggestion. Her elder sister, legally named Jack-Louise (1916–2005), was called Louise or occasionally Jackie.

== Career ==
=== Acting ===
Baby Peggy was "discovered" at the age of 19 months, when she visited Century Studios on Sunset Boulevard in Hollywood with her mother and a film-extra friend. Her father, Jack, a former cowboy and park ranger, had done work as a stuntman and stand-in for Tom Mix in a number of his cowboy films. Impressed by Peggy's well-behaved demeanor and willingness to follow directions from her father, director Fred Fishback hired her to appear in a series of short films with Century's canine star Brownie the Wonder Dog. The first film, Playmates in 1921, was a success, and Peggy was signed to a long-term contract with Century.

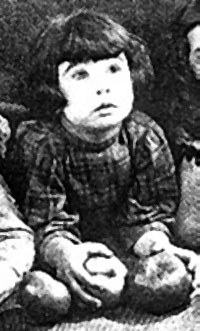
Baby Peggy in The Family Secret

Between 1921 and 1924, Peggy made close to 150 short comedy films for Century. Her films often spoofed full-length motion pictures, social issues and stars of the era; in one, Peg O' The Movies, she satirized both Rudolph Valentino and Pola Negri. She also appeared in film adaptations of novels and fairy tales, such as Hansel and Gretel and Jack and the Beanstalk, contemporary comedies, and a few full-length motion pictures.

In 1923, Peggy began working for Universal Studios, appearing in full-length dramatic films. Among her works from this era were The Darling of New York, directed by King Baggot, and the first screen adaptation of Captain January. In line with her status as a star, Peggy's Universal films were produced and marketed as "Universal Jewels", the studio's most prestigious and most expensive classification. During this time, she also starred in Helen's Babies, opposite Clara Bow.

The success of the Baby Peggy films brought her into prominence. When she was not filming, she embarked on extensive "In-Person" personal appearance tours across the country to promote her films. She was also featured in several short skits on major stages in Los Angeles and New York City, including Grauman's Million Dollar Theatre and the Hippodrome. Her likeness appeared on magazine covers and was used in advertisements for various businesses and charitable campaigns. She was also named the Official Mascot of the 1924 Democratic Convention in New York City, and stood onstage waving a United States flag next to Franklin Delano Roosevelt.

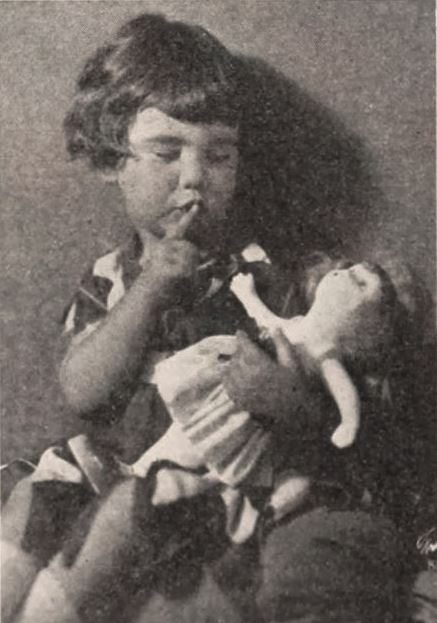
Baby Peggy holding a Baby Peggy doll - June 1922

By the age of 5, she had her own line of various endorsed items, including dolls in her likeness, sheet music, jewelry, and milk.

As a child, Frances Gumm (later Judy Garland) owned at least one Baby Peggy doll. Cary would later befriend Garland, and wrote in her autobiography that she believed Garland's mother had pursued fame for her children based on Baby Peggy's success.

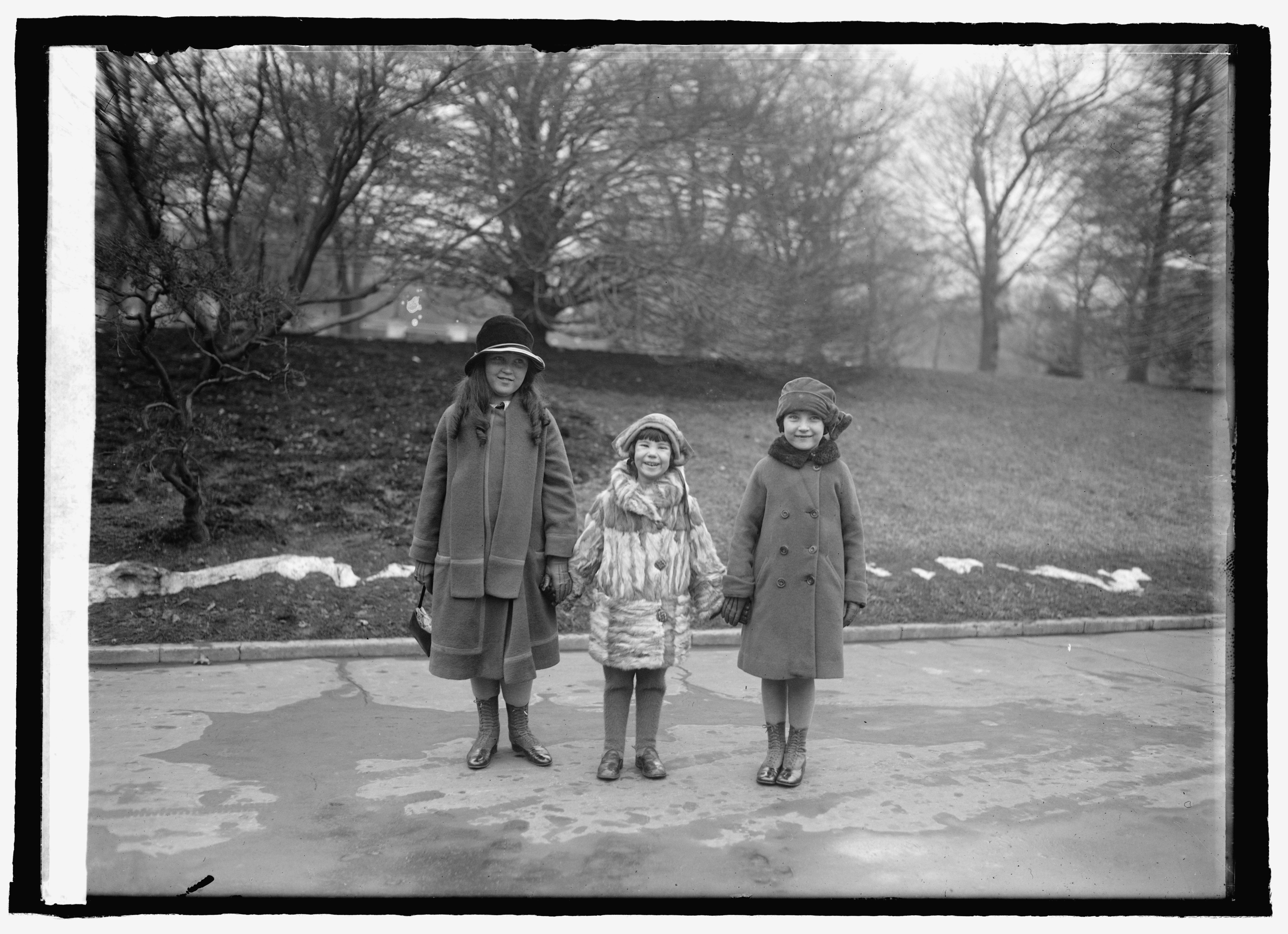
Baby Peggy with Frances & Gene Quirk. Peggy was meeting President Coolidge at the White House, Washington D.C., February 2, 1925

While under contract with Century and Universal, Peggy commanded an impressive salary. By 1923, she was signed to a $1.5 million a year contract at Universal ($28.2 million in 2025); on her vaudeville tours she made $300 per day. Her parents handled all of the finances and money was spent on expensive cars, homes, and clothing. Nothing was set aside for the welfare or education of Peggy or her sister. Peggy herself was paid one nickel for every vaudeville performance. Through reckless spending and corrupt business partners of her father, her entire fortune was gone before she hit puberty. When fellow child star Jackie Coogan sued his parents in 1938, Peggy's parents asked her if she was going to do the same. Believing it would do no good, Peggy did not pursue legal action. Coogan's case, and cases like Baby Peggy's, eventually inspired the Coogan Act to protect child actors' earnings.

=== Working conditions ===
Peggy's working conditions, as described in later interviews and her autobiography, were harsh. As a toddler she worked eight hours a day, six days a week. She was generally required to perform her own stunts, which included being held underwater in the ocean until she fainted (Sea Shore Shapes), escaping alone from a burning room (The Darling of New York), and riding underneath a train car (Miles of Smiles). While at Century she also witnessed several instances of animal cruelty and saw a trainer crushed to death by an elephant.

Schooling for both Peggy and her sister, Louise, was sporadic at best. Neither attended school until the end of the vaudeville era; for their secondary education, they worked to pay for their tuition at Lawlor Professional School, which offered flexible schedules and allowed them to continue performing in films.

Baby Peggy's career was controlled by her father, who accompanied her to the studio every day and made every decision about her contracts. Her father often claimed that Peggy's success was based not on her own talent, but on her ability to follow orders unquestioningly.

=== Film career fade out and stage work ===
Baby Peggy's film career abruptly ended in 1925 when her father had a falling out with producer Sol Lesser over her salary and canceled her contract. She found herself essentially blacklisted due to actions of her father with his studio boss, and was able to land only one more part in silent films, a minor role in the 1926 picture April Fool.

From 1925 to 1929, Peggy had a successful career as a vaudeville performer. Although her routine, which included a comedy sketch, singing and a dramatic monologue, was initially met with skepticism, it soon became a popular and respected act. Although she was prohibited from "playing the Palace" because of her young age, she appeared onstage there as a special guest. Peggy and her family toured the United States and Canada, performing in major venues, until the family tired of touring.

While on the vaudeville circuit, Peggy was frequently ill with tonsillitis and other ailments; however, she continued working. In What Ever Happened to Baby Peggy?, she wrote, "On several occasions I went onstage so yellow-dog sick they had to put buckets in the wings: I threw up in one before I made my entrance, and in the second when I exited, before changing and going back out for my encore." Her mother feared for her health, another reason for leaving the rough life of touring.

Peggy's parents continued to spend excessively after she had been pushed out of films, wasting on unnecessary luxuries much of the US$2 million she had made. Peggy's father planned to buy a ranch and convert it into a high-end getaway. However, the stock market crash of 1929 put an immediate halt to the plans. The Montgomerys had to sell their Beverly Hills home and, having made a $75,000 deposit on the land and existing property, moved to rural Wyoming where they lived near the Jelm Mountains. Peggy found the change in pace refreshing and hoped her stage days were over. However, the family struggled to make a living, and, as a last-ditch effort, returned to Hollywood in the early 1930s, much to the teenaged Peggy's chagrin. She stated in a 2012 interview that she was paid three dollars a day, many of the other extras were other silent actor stars that she grew up with, and collectively they considered the work to be like that of "galley slaves".

Peggy posed for publicity photos with Douglas Fairbanks Sr., and signed with a new manager. Hopes of a comeback were mostly dashed by false rumors of a bad screen test that had never taken place. The family resorted to using food coupons from the Motion Picture Relief Fund. The Los Angeles School Board asserted that Peggy had to go to school, and was first enrolled at Lawlor Professional School, a school with flexible hours for child actors, and was classmates with Mickey Rooney and Judy Garland. She later attended Fairfax High School while the entire family was forced to take extra work. She loathed screen work and retired soon after appearing in Having Wonderful Time in 1938.

In the spring of 1940, Peggy's career had reached such a low, journalist Walter Winchell in his column On Broadway reported Peggy and her husband Gordon Ayres were now living in a small furnished room in New York City, with only doughnuts to eat. Gordon Ayres was working as a bartender while Peggy was looking for a screen job.

In 2013, Cary made her only return to the film industry in a short titled, Broncho Billy and the Bandit's Secret in a cameo appearance.

== Post-acting years ==
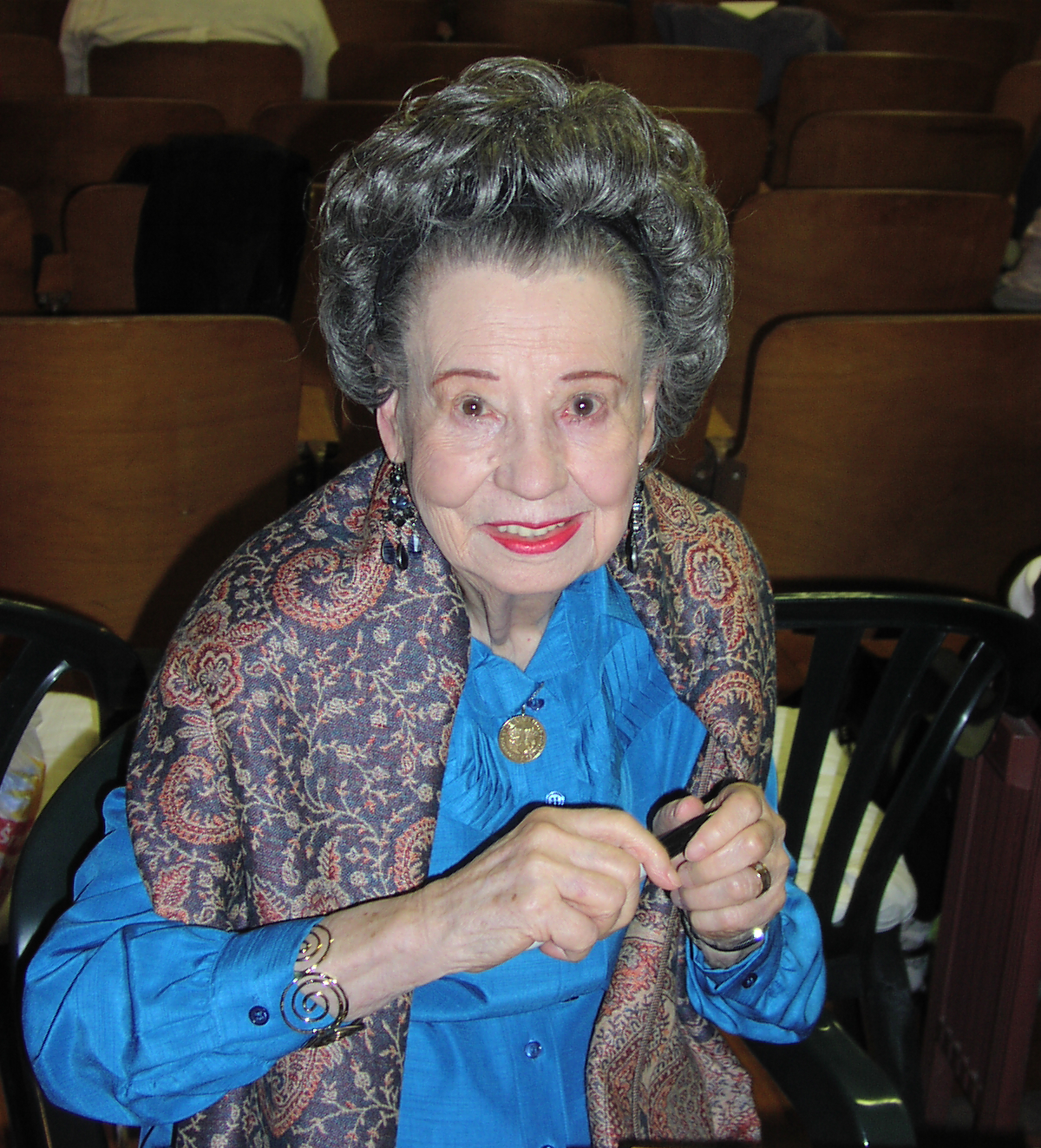
Diana Serra Cary in 2012

Peggy married Gordon Ayres in 1938 and a few years later adopted the name Diana Ayres in an effort to distance herself from the Baby Peggy image. Working at the time as a writer for radio shows, she found that people who figured out her identity were more interested in her Baby Peggy persona than in her writing abilities. She later changed her name to Diana Serra Cary explaining, "After my divorce [from Gordon Ayres] and when I became a Catholic I took Serra as my confirmation name. When I married Bob [her second husband] I became Mrs. Cary."

Following acting, she had worked as a switchboard operator, a bookstore clerk, and a gift shop manager before she got into freelance writing.

Eventually, after years of emotional struggle and open derision from Hollywood insiders and the media, Cary made peace with her Baby Peggy past. She had successful careers as a publisher, historian and author on Hollywood subjects, writing, among other works, an autobiography of her life as a child star, What Ever Happened to Baby Peggy: The Autobiography of Hollywood's Pioneer Child Star, and a biography of her contemporary and rival named Jackie Coogan: The World's Boy King: A Biography of Hollywood's Legendary Child Star.

As an adult, Cary worked on numerous books about the early film industry, Hollywood cowboys and harsh working conditions for child stars in Hollywood. At the end of her own autobiography, she recounts the fates of numerous child stars, including Judy Garland and Shirley Temple. She also advocated for reforms in child performer protection laws as a member of the organization "A Minor Consideration".

Cary appeared in numerous television documentaries and interviews about her work, and made guest appearances at silent film festivals. At the age of 99, Cary self-published her first novel, The Drowning of the Moon.

== Personal life ==
At the age of seventeen, trying to escape the film industry and her parents' plans for her life, Cary ran away from home and rented an apartment with her sister Louise. She married actor Gordon Ayres, whom she met on the set of Ah, Wilderness!, in 1938. They divorced in 1948. In 1954, she married artist Robert "Bob" Cary (sometimes listed as Bob Carey). They had one son, Mark. They remained married until Bob Cary's death in 2001. She lived in Gustine, California, near Modesto, for many years.

== Death ==
Peggy died at her home in Gustine, California, on February 24, 2020, at the age of 101.

== Honors ==
On November 8, 2008, ten days after her 90th birthday, Cary was honored at the Niles Essanay Silent Film Museum's Edison Theatre in Niles, California, with a screening of two of her feature films, Helen's Babies and Captain January.

Diana Serra Cary's handprints and signature are preserved in cement outside the Vista Theater in East Hollywood. Baby Peggy's film "Tips" was the first film shown at the cinema when it opened in 1923.

Since 2012, there have been attempts to get Cary a star on the Hollywood Walk of Fame through a crowdfunding campaign, but as of 2026 it has not yet succeeded. On December 3, 2012, Turner Classic Movies first presented the 2011 documentary Baby Peggy: The Elephant in the Room, and has since reaired on various occasions, such as alongside the first broadcast of the Library of Congress-restored version of The Family Secret on October 25, 2015, to mark Cary's 97th birthday.

In 2018, Cary was honored at the 54th Annual Cinecon Classic Film Festival with the Cinecon Legacy Award accompanied by a screening of the restored feature, Helen's Babies with a world premiere score by composer Scott Lasky. It was performed by the Famous Players Orchestra at Grauman's Egyptian Theater. Too ill to attend, Lasky flew to Gustine, California and recorded an interview with Cary where she talked about making the film and of its co-stars, Clara Bow and Edward Everett Horton. It was screened prior to the feature film.

== Films ==
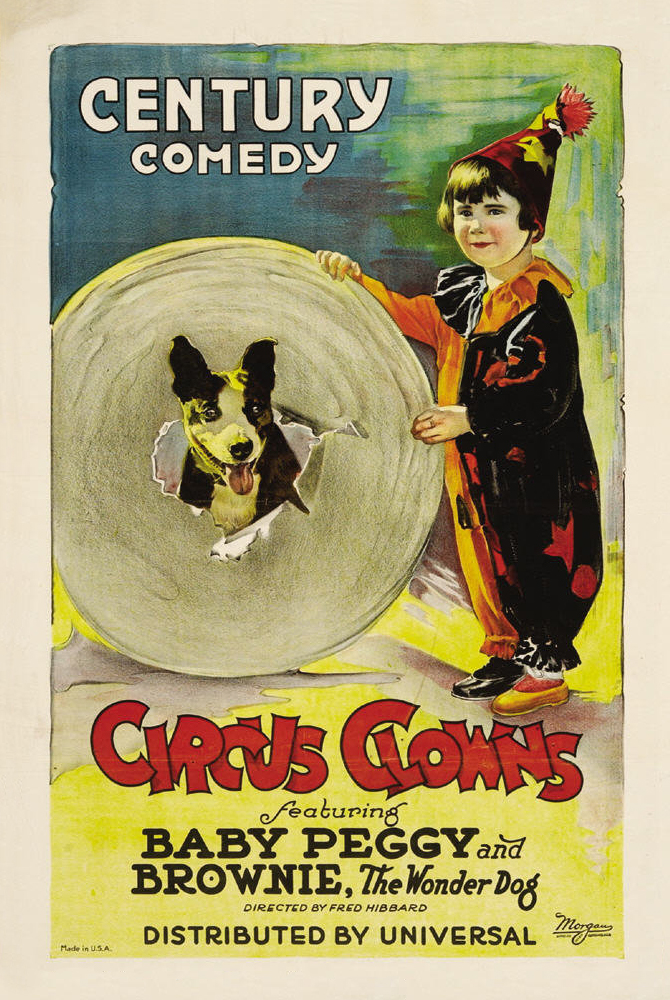
Poster for Circus Clowns, directed by Fred Fishback (1922)

The vast majority of Cary's Baby Peggy films have not survived and records related to their production have been lost as well. Century Studios burned down in 1926. In addition, another older actress named Peggy Montgomery (1904–1989) was active in Hollywood Western films between 1924 and 1929; her credits are occasionally confused with those of Baby Peggy. Filmographies at major websites are incomplete, and sometimes incorrect, because of these factors.

A handful of Baby Peggy shorts, including Playmates, Miles of Smiles and Sweetie, have been discovered and preserved in film archives around the world, including the Museum of Modern Art in New York City. The full-length films The Family Secret, April Fool, Captain January and Helen's Babies have also survived, are currently in the public domain, and have been restored and made available for sale by several independent film dealers. A full copy of The Law Forbids is also rumored to exist, but it has not surfaced publicly. In addition, fragments of some works, including The Law Forbids, The Darling of New York and Little Red Riding Hood have surfaced and been restored.

In 2016, it was announced that her lost 1924 film Our Pet had been re-discovered in Japan.

=== Filmography ===
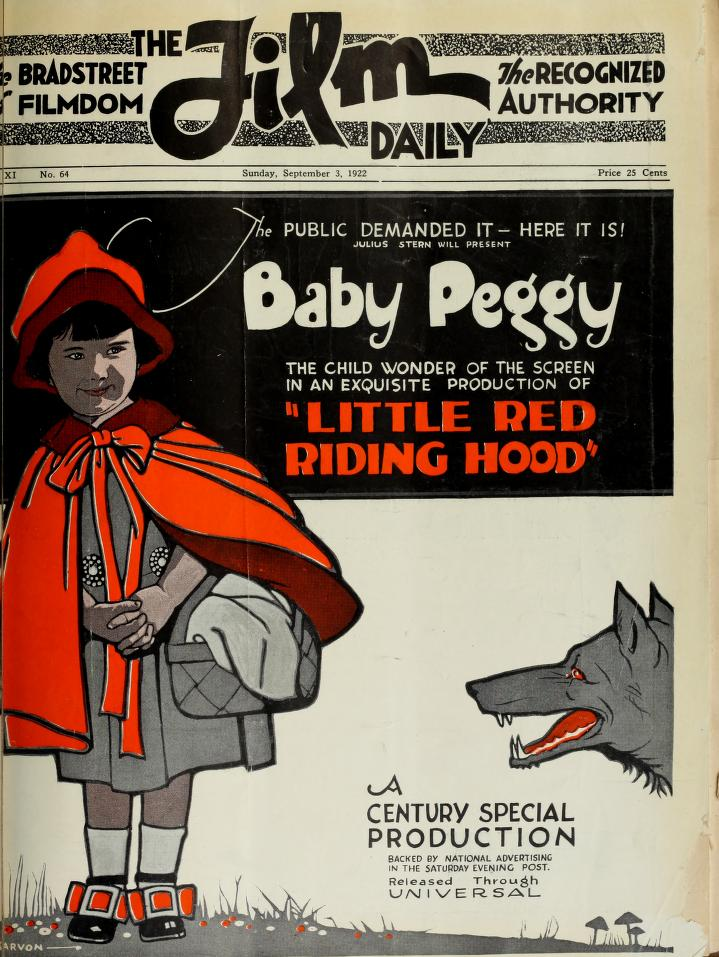
September 3, 1922, cover of The Film Daily

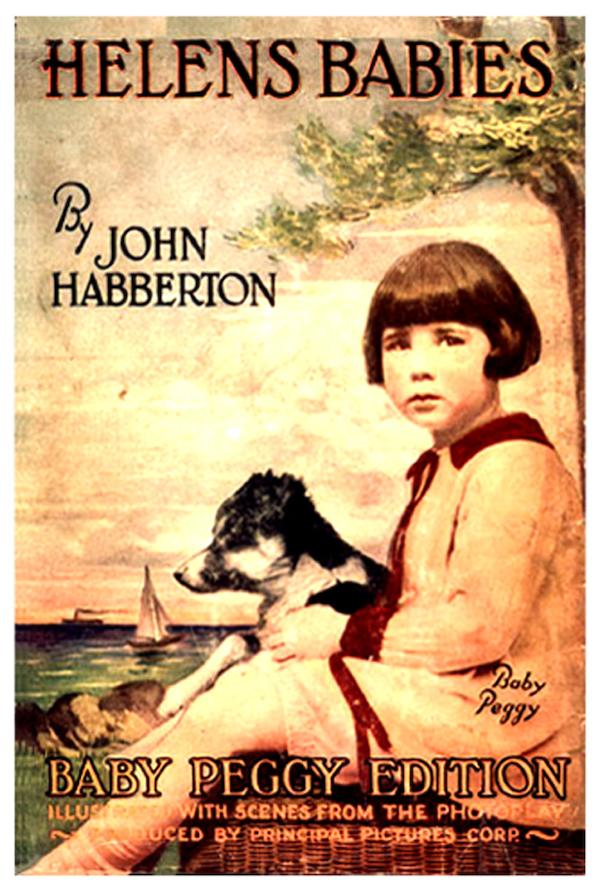
Helen's Babies, Baby Peggy edition

As documented by research of the Museum of Modern Art.

Short subject
Year	Title	Role	Notes
1921	Her Circus Man		
1921	On with the Show		
1921	The Kid's Pal		
1921	Playmates		Credited as Peggy Montgomery
1921	On Account		
1921	Pals		
1921	Third Class Male		
1921	The Clean Up		
1921	Golfing		
1921	Brownie's Little Venus		
1921	A Week Off		
1921	Brownie's Baby Doll		
1921	Sea Shore Shapes		
1921	A Muddy Bride		
1921	Teddy's Goat		
1921	Get-Rich-Quick Peggy		
1921	Chums		
1922	The Straphanger		Unconfirmed
1922	Circus Clowns		
1922	The Little Rascal		
1922	Fools First	Little girl	
1922	Little Red Riding Hood	Little Red Riding Hood	
1923	Peg o' the Movies	Peg	
1923	Sweetie		
1923	The Kid Reporter	Peggy	
1923	Taking Orders		
1923	Nobody's Darling		
1923	Tips		
1923	Little Miss Hollywood	Little Miss Hollywood	
1923	Miles of Smiles	The Twins (dual role)	
1924	Our Pet		
1924	The Flower Girl		
1924	Stepping Some		
1924	Poor Kid		
1923	Hansel and Gretel		
1924	Jack and the Beanstalk		
1924	Such Is Life		
1924	Peg o' the Mounties		
1932	Off His Base	Peggy	Credited as Peggy Montgomery; Jerry of the Journal series
2013	Broncho Billy and the Bandit's Secret	The Movie Star	Only return to the film industry after 75 years.

Features
Year	Title	Role	Notes
1921	Fool's Paradise	Child	Uncredited
1922	Little Miss Mischief		
1922	Penrod	Baby Rennsdale	Credited as Peggy Jane; lost film
1922	Peggy, Behave!	Peggy	
1923	Hollywood	Herself (cameo)	Lost film
1923	Carmen Jr.		
1923	The Darling of New York	Santussa	Credited as Baby Peggy Montgomery
1924	The Law Forbids	Peggy	Incomplete film
1924	Captain January	Captain January	
1924	The Family Secret	Peggy Holmes	
1924	Helen's Babies	Toodie	
1926	April Fool	Irma Goodman	
1926	The Dangerous Dub	Rose Cooper	
1926	Prisoners of the Storm	Joan Le Grande	
1934	Eight Girls in a Boat	Hortense	Credited as Peggy Montgomery
1934	The Return of Chandu	Judy Allen, party guest	Uncredited
1935	Ah, Wilderness!	Schoolgirl at graduation	Uncredited
1936	Girls' Dormitory	Schoolgirl	Credited as Peggy Montgomery
1937	Souls at Sea	Bit Role	Uncredited
1937	True Confession	Autograph Hunter	Uncredited
1938	Having Wonderful Time	Extra	Uncredited; Alternative title: Having a Wonderful Time

== See also ==
- List of centenarians (actors, filmmakers and entertainers)
