= The Darling of New York =

1923 film by King Baggot

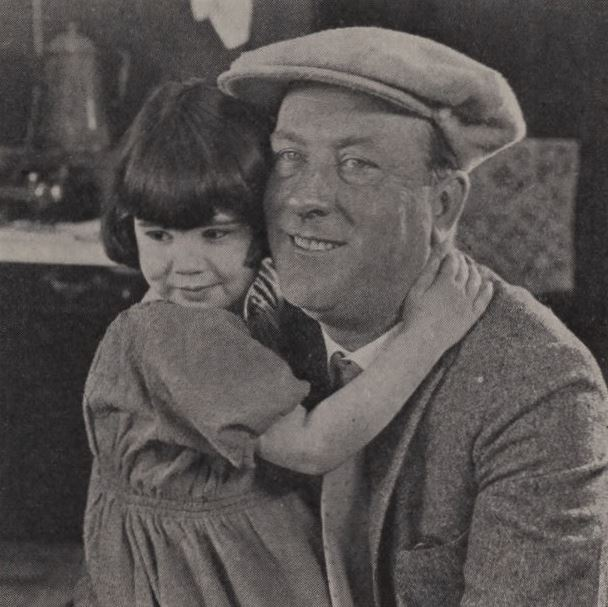
- Still with Baby Peggy and director King Baggot
- Directed by: King Baggot
- Written by: King Baggot (story); Adrian Johnson; Raymond L. Schrock
- Starring: Baby Peggy; Sheldon Lewis; Gladys Brockwell
- Cinematography: John Stumar
- Production company: Universal Pictures
- Distributed by: Universal Pictures
- Release date: December 3, 1923
- Running time: 60 minutes
- Country: United States
- Language: Silent (English intertitles)

The Darling of New York is a 1923 American silent comedy film directed by King Baggot and written by Adrian Johnson and Raymond L. Schrock. The film stars Baby Peggy, her first feature film. The film was released on December 3, 1923, by Universal Pictures. In the film, Baby Peggy plays Santussa, who after she is taken by a gang of jewel smugglers is able to reform them.

== Plot ==
As described in a film magazine review, Italian orphan Santussa is sent to New York City to be cared by for her grandfather. Accompanying Santussa is her Governess. In order to protect themselves and perhaps collect a large ransom, a gem smuggler separates her from her Governess and steals little Baby Peggy. Some stolen gems have been secreted in the clothes of a little rag doll which Baby Peggy has with her, and she is kidnapped from the Italian pier by the gem smuggler. She is cast in with the gang of smugglers at their hideout in New York City's Lower East Side, an immigrant, working-class neighborhood, and goes through a great number of harrowing experiences. Through her actions, members of the gang become reformed and Santussa is finally restored to her family.

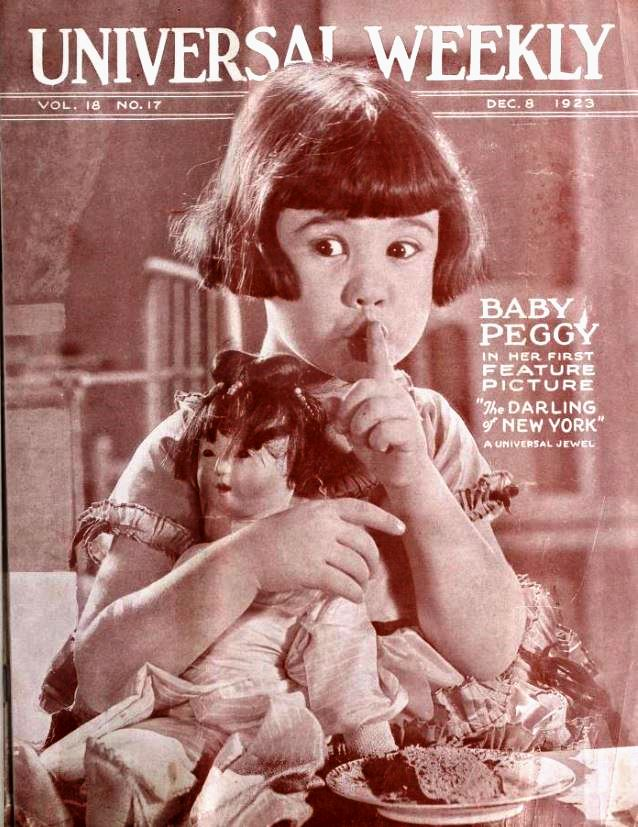
Baby Peggy holding the rag doll with the stolen gems, from a trade magazine cover

== Cast ==
- Baby Peggy as Santussa
- Sheldon Lewis as Giovanni
- Gladys Brockwell as Light Fingered Kitty
- Pat Hartigan as Big Mike
- Frank Currier as Grandfather Van Dyne
- Frank Coghlan Jr. as The Ross Kid
- Dorothy Hagan as Mrs. Ross
- Estelle Goulder as Governess
- Carl Stockdale as Soulful Sid
- William H. Turner as Close, the Master Mind
- Jose Devere as Florrie
- William Quinn as Ice Malone
- Max Davidson as Solomon Levinsky
- Emma Steele as Mrs. Levinsky
- Spec O'Donnell as Willie

== Preservation ==
This film is presumed to be a lost film with only the last reel, which shows the fire destroying the smugglers' hideout, surviving at the UCLA Film & Television Archive.

== See also ==
- List of incomplete or partially lost films
