= Wanda Wiley =

American actress

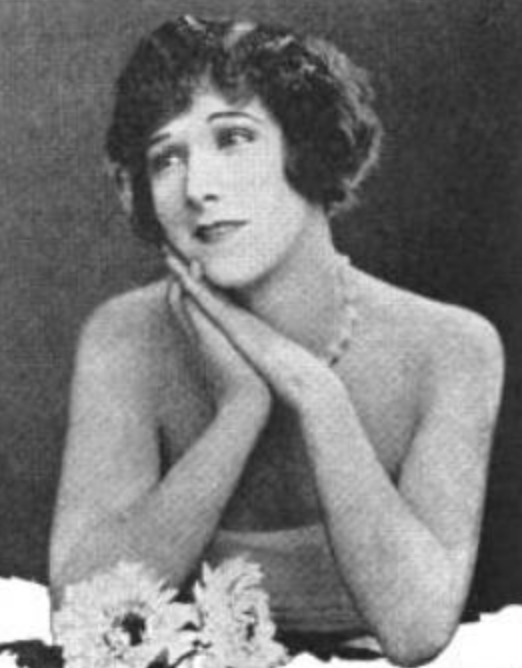
- Wanda Wiley, from a 1926 advertisement
- Born: April 20, 1901; New Boston, Texas, U.S.
- Died: March 29, 1987 (aged 85); Las Vegas, Nevada, U.S.
- Other names: Wanda Atkinson
- Occupation: Actress

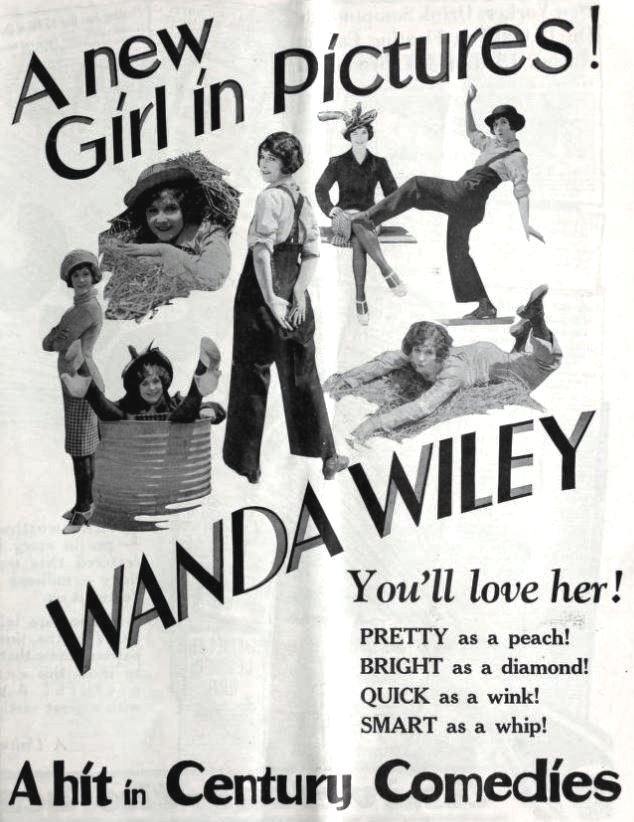
Advertisement for films with actress Wanda Wiley

Wanda Wiley Atkinson (April 20, 1901 – March 29, 1987) was an American silent film actress who appeared in dozens of comedy shorts between 1924 and 1927.

== Early life and education ==
Wiley was born in New Boston, Texas, the youngest of twelve children born to James Alexander Wiley Sr. and Ida Ione Barnett Wiley. Her mother was born in Mississippi. She studied at the Texas Dental College before seeking a film career.

== Career ==
Wiley was a comedian who appeared in dozens of short films between 1924 and 1927. She was athletic, and her films often featured her performing slapstick physical stunts. She suffered an injury when she was thrown from a startled horse on one film set. On another occasion she was injured when she was hurled from a motorcycle. She played a football player in Gridiron Gertie (1925).

Wiley was under contract with the Century Film Corporation in 1925. and was described that year as "one of the biggest individual moneymakers of all the comediennes in the picture business." She signed with Bray Productions in 1926. She starred in a series of "What Happened to Jane" shorts in 1926 (Jane's Inheritance, Jane's Troubles, Jane's Engagement Party, Jane's Predicament, Jane's Honeymoon, and Jane's Flirtation), before she was replaced in the role by Thelma Daniels in 1927.

In the 1960s, Wanda Wiley Atkinson exhibited her paintings in New Mexico, and went to Paris to paint while her niece Patricia Boward pursued a modeling career.

== Films ==
=== 1927 ===
- Lost in a Pullman
- Weak Knees
- Hot Tires
- The Speed Hound
- A Polo Bear
- Try and Do It
- Thanks for the Boat Ride
- Jane's Flirtation

=== 1926 ===
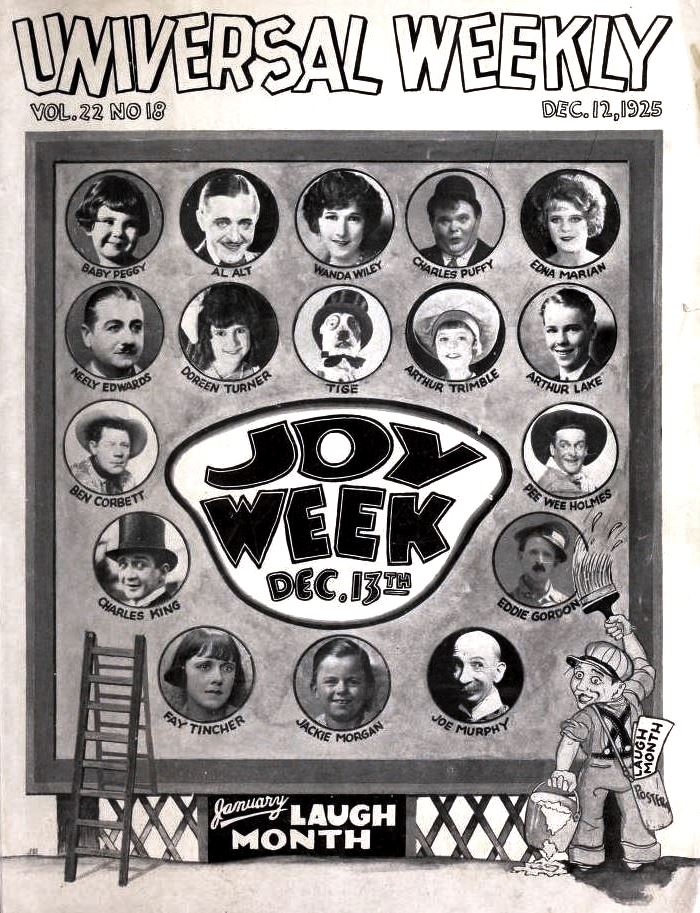
Wanda Wiley, top center, 1925

- Blue Black
- Jane's Predicament
- Look Out Below
- Jane's Engagement Party
- Jane's Troubles
- Punches and Perfume
- The Fighting Fool
- Jane's Inheritance
- Mixed Brides
- A Thrilling Romance
- There She Goes
- Twin Sisters
- Playing the Swell
- Painless Pain
- Yearning for Love
- Flying Wheels
- Her Lucky Leap

=== 1925 ===
- Going Good
- The Speedy Marriage
- A Winning Pair
- Cupid's Victory
- Won by Law
- Just in Time
- Gridiron Gertie
- The Queen of Aces
- Don't Worry
- Nobody's Sweetheart
- Getting Trimmed
- Looking Down

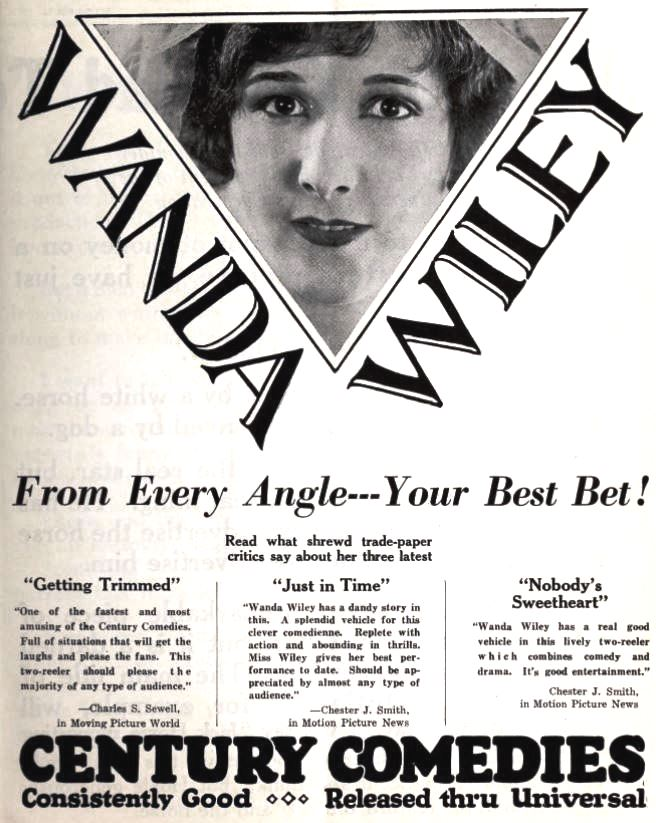
Advertisement for Century Comedies films with actress Wanda Wiley

=== 1924 ===
- Present Arms
- Sweet Dreams
- Some Tomboy
- Snappy Eyes
- The Trouble Fixer
- Her Fortunate Face
- Her City Sport
- Starving Beauties
- Hello, 'Frisco

== Personal life and legacy ==
Wiley was injured in a 1925 car accident in Los Angeles. She married eye surgeon Donald Taylor Atkinson in 1935. Wiley's husband died in San Antonio in 1959, and she died in 1987, in Las Vegas, Nevada, at the age of 85. Most, but not all, of her films are considered lost. A Thrilling Romance (1926) is in the collection of the Library of Congress.
