= The Dangerous Dub =

1926 film

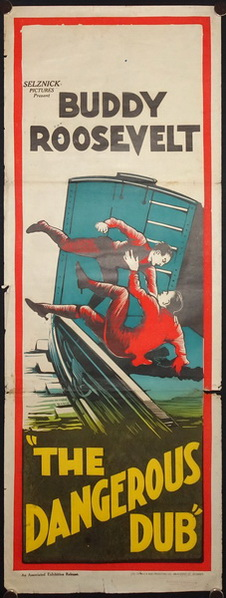
- Australian long daybill for the film
- Directed by: Richard Thorpe
- Written by: Frank L. Inghram; Peggy Montgomery; Joseph Girard
- Produced by: Lester Scott Jr.
- Starring: Buddy Roosevelt; Harry Todd; Judith King
- Production company: Action Pictures
- Distributed by: Associated Exhibitors
- Release date: July 4, 1926 (US)
- Running time: 5 reels
- Country: United States
- Languages: Silent; English intertitles

The Dangerous Dub is a 1926 American silent Western film. Directed by Richard Thorpe, the film stars Buddy Roosevelt, Peggy Montgomery, and Joseph Girard. It was released on July 4, 1926.

== Plot ==
Buddy Martin, a cattle driver, is in love with Rose Cooper, whom he met in Omaha. Thanks to her, he finds a job in the ranch of Rose's mother. He will discover a plot between Rose's father-in-law and an outlaw, and will succeed in blaming them and then marrying Rose.

== Cast ==
- Buddy Roosevelt as Buddy Martin
- Peggy Montgomery as Rose Cooper
- Joseph Girard as W. J. Cooper
- Fanny Midgley as Mrs. Cooper
- Al Taylor as Scar-Face Hanan
- Curley Riviere as the law

== Production ==
In May 1926 it was revealed that Lester Scott Jr. would be producing the film.

== Reception ==
Photoplay gave the film a short, lukewarm review, complimenting the riding showmanship of Buddy Roosevelt, but finding little else in the picture to be positive about.

== Preservation ==
With no holdings located in archives, The Dangerous Dub is considered a lost film.
