= Our Pet =

- Directed by: Herman C. Raymaker
- Story by: Herman C. Raymaker
- Starring: Baby Peggy; Newton Hall; Winston Radom
- Release date: May 11, 1924
- Running time: One reel (15-20 minutes?)
- Country: United States
- Language: Silent

Our Pet is a 1924 black-and-white silent comedy short film featuring child star Baby Peggy. It was long thought lost, as are most of the Baby Peggy films, but surfaced in a Japanese auction and was identified in 2016.

== Cast ==
- Baby Peggy as Peggy
- Newton Hall as Peggy's friend
- Winston Radom as Peggy's friend
- Verne Winter as Peggy's friend
- Kenneth Green as Peggy's friend
- Joe Moore as Policeman
- Billy Franey as Thief
- Edna Gregory as Peggy's mother
- Harry Archer as Peggy's father
