= Here Come the Girls (1918 film) =

1918 film

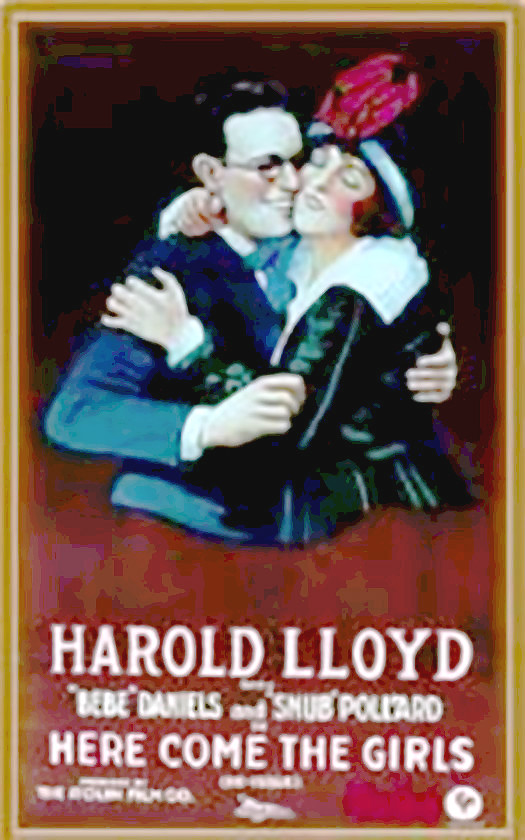
- Film poster
- Directed by: Fred Fishback
- Written by: H. M. Walker
- Produced by: Hal Roach
- Starring: Harold Lloyd
- Cinematography: Walter Lundin
- Production company: Rolin Films
- Distributed by: Pathé Exchange
- Release date: March 17, 1918
- Running time: 1 reel
- Country: United States
- Language: Silent (English intertitles)

Here Come the Girls is a 1918 American silent comedy short film featuring Harold Lloyd about activities in a corset shop. Prints of the film survive in the film archive of the Museum of Modern Art in New York City.

== Cast ==
- Harold Lloyd
- Snub Pollard
- Bebe Daniels
- William Blaisdell
- Sammy Brooks
- Lige Conley (credited as Lige Cromley)
- Genevieve Cunningham
- Billy Fay (credited as William Fay)
- William Gillespie
- Bud Jamison
- Gus Leonard
- James Parrott
- Dorothea Wolbert

== Reception ==
Like many American films of the time, Here Come the Girls was subject to cuts by city and state film censorship boards. For example, the Chicago Board of Censors cut all but one scene of the young women behind the curtain showing bare shoulders and legs and four scenes of the women's skirts being pulled up by ribbon exposing legs.
