= Prisoners of the Storm =

1926 film

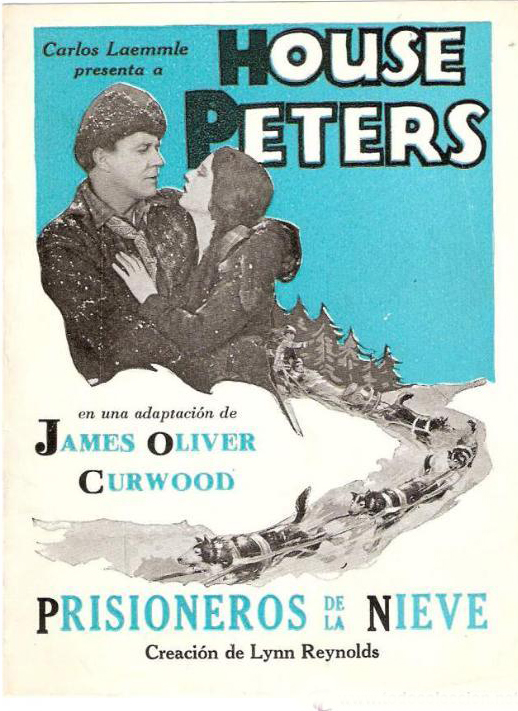
- Spanish poster
- Directed by: Lynn Reynolds
- Written by: James Oliver Curwood (story); Charles A. Logue
- Produced by: Carl Laemmle
- Starring: House Peters; Peggy Montgomery; Walter McGrail
- Cinematography: Gilbert Warrenton
- Production company: Universal Pictures
- Distributed by: Universal Pictures
- Release date: November 24, 1926
- Running time: 66 minutes
- Country: United States
- Language: Silent (English intertitles)

Prisoners of the Storm is a 1926 American silent Western film directed by Lynn Reynolds and starring House Peters, Peggy Montgomery, and Walter McGrail.

== Plot ==
As described in a film magazine, Bucky Malone and his elder partner, Pierre LeGrande, prepare to close their northern mine to avoid being snowed in for the winter. Sergeant McClellan, of the Mounted Police, overhears them in a trivial quarrel, and, when he arrives at White Lake, their destination, he is one of a group of people who see LeGrande's dog sledge pull in without LeGrande. McClellan hits the trail and finds evidence that LeGrande has been murdered. He suspects Malone, not knowing that the two miners parted at the mine. Attempting to make the arrest, he is wounded by Malone in a scuffle and carried by the latter to a cabin where his leg swells and brings on a high fever. Malone then risks capture by going to the settlement for a doctor. In White Lake he meets LeGrande's daughter, Joan, who is in serious financial straits. Doctor Chambers, a disbarred physician, has offered aid which she has declined, being suspicious of his motives. Not knowing that the stranger was her father's partner, she appeals to him to help her in finding her father. A blizzard threatens and the doctor refuses to make the trip, so Malone sets out at night alone with bandages and medicine. The girl follows him at daybreak and the doctor, being unable to dissuade her, goes with her to the cabin where they are snowed in with the policeman and his prisoner. The jealous doctor turns McClellan against the man who has saved his life, and Joan's love, which has been growing for Malone, turns to hate when she learns that he is accused of murdering her father. A snowslide buries the little cabin under a mountainous drift. Vainly they attempt to tunnel their way out. The air in the little hut is almost exhausted when Malone sees a big box of blasting powder. He prepares a big charge and sets it off. A peep of daylight appears after the explosion. The doctor rushes for the opening. Malone warns him that a second charge is coming, but too late. The doctor is killed by the charge which sets the others free. The contents of his medicine case are scattered about the floor, and among them is found the bag of nuggets belonging to the murdered LeGrande. Malone is free and Joan shows her feelings and comes to his arms.

== Cast ==
- House Peters as 'Bucky' Malone
- Peggy Montgomery as Joan Le Grande
- Walter McGrail as Sergeant McClellan
- Harry Todd as Pete Le Grande
- Fred DeSilva as Dr. Chambers
- Clark Comstock as Angus McLynn
- Evelyn Selbie as Lillian Nicholson

== Bibliography ==
- Goble, Alan. The Complete Index to Literary Sources in Film. Walter de Gruyter, 1999.
