= Captain January (1936 film) =

1936 film by David Butler

- Theatrical release poster
- Directed by: David Butler
- Screenplay by: Sam Hellman; Gladys Lehman; Harry Tugend
- Based on: Captain January; 1890 novel by Laura E. Richards
- Produced by: Darryl F. Zanuck
- Starring: Shirley Temple; Guy Kibbee; Slim Summerville; Buddy Ebsen; Sara Haden; June Lang; Jane Darwell
- Cinematography: John F. Seitz
- Edited by: Irene Morra
- Music by: Lew Pollack
- Distributed by: Twentieth Century-Fox Film Corporation
- Release date: April 24, 1936
- Running time: 75 minutes
- Country: United States
- Language: English
- Box office: $1.3 million

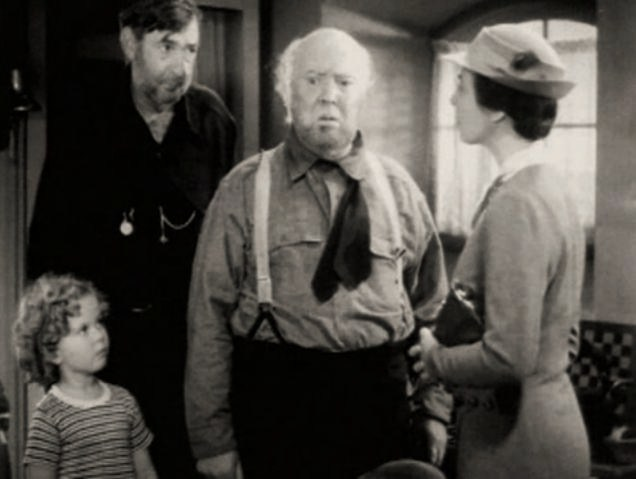
L-R: Shirley Temple, Slim Summerville, Guy Kibbee, and Sara Haden

Captain January is a 1936 American musical comedy-drama film directed by David Butler. The screenplay by Sam Hellman, Gladys Lehman, and Harry Tugend is based on the 1890 children's book of the same name by Laura E. Richards. The film stars Shirley Temple, Guy Kibbee, and Sara Haden.

There was a tentative attempt at a copyright renewal, but now the film is in the public domain due to "a legal loophole".

== Plot ==
Kindly lighthouse keeper, Captain January, has been raising and educating Star, a sweet, eight-year-old girl he rescued after her parents drowned at sea when she was a baby. He is helped by his two friends, Captain Nazro and Paul Roberts, a mariner. Truant officer Agatha Morgan determines that Star's home schooling is inadequate. Star is then tested and admitted to the third grade. Meanwhile, Mrs. Croft, a friendly widow, has been attempting to woo Captain January.

Nazro receives a notice that all lighthouses are being fully automated by the end of the month, displacing lighthouse keepers. Knowing that January will be unable to support Star, Nazro writes to George Mason, who he believes may be Star's uncle. January is devastated over losing his job, while Nazro grows concerned that his letter to Mr. Mason goes unanswered, knowing Morgan will place Star in an orphanage. January is furious to learn Nazro has contacted Mr. Mason and vows never to give up Star.

Soon after, Nazro arrives and warns January that Morgan is coming to take Star. January and Star hide out on Nazro's boat, but the authorities soon find them and Star is taken. A court hearing is scheduled, but Star's aunt and uncle, who have been out of the country for several years, arrive and assume custody of their niece.

The wealthy Masons provide Star a happy and privileged life, but she deeply misses January. Mr. and Mrs. Mason take Star to see their new yacht. Star is ecstatic to discover that January is the captain, Nazro the first mate, and Paul the deckhand. To January's surprise, Mrs. Croft is the cook.

== Cast ==
- Shirley Temple as Helen 'Star' Mason, an 8-year-old girl who is a foundling rescued from the sea by Capt. January
- Guy Kibbee as Captain January, the lighthouse keeper at Cape Tempest, Maine
- Slim Summerville as Captain Nazro, January's friend
- Buddy Ebsen as Paul Roberts, January's friend
- Sara Haden as Agatha Morgan, a stern truant officer
- June Lang as Mary, a young, kindhearted schoolteacher
- Jane Darwell as Mrs. Eliza Croft, a widow smitten with Capt. January
- Jerry Tucker as Cyril Morgan a 10-year-old boy
- George Irving as John Mason, Star's uncle
- Nella Walker as Mrs. Mason, Star's aunt
- Si Jenks as Old Sailor

== Production ==
The movie was the first to use the new sound stage 20th Century Fox dedicated to Will Rogers in 1935. Temple learned her multiplication tables while doing the tap dance sequence down the spiral staircase. There were two notable animal rights abuses on the set during the making of this movie. In the famous Codfish Ball sequence, real lobsters were used on the set as a prop but were deemed potentially hazardous and were cooked and repainted their natural red color. In another scene, a live crane was brought in. The bird kept pecking at Temple's eyes, however and as a way of solving this problem, nails were driven through the webbing of the crane's feet, anchoring it to the ground. The bird was brought from Florida by a bird fancier and stood 4 feet (1.2 m) tall, with grey colored plumage desirable for filming. The bird mimicked movements from its trainer to achieve the dancing effect and was rewarded with fish when the movements were followed correctly.

Temple performed unintentional ad-lib during a scene with co-stars Kibbee and Summerville as they burlesqued the sextette from Lucia. Temple struggled to hit the high notes needed during the musical number and shooting was about to be halted when Temple found a note she was unable to reach. She conveyed frustration and proclaimed "it's too high, too high" in timing with the music, before continuing once the notes dropped back to a range she could handle. Director David Butler liked the naturalness of the scene and felt this was more preferable than a perfect rendition and accepted the take without any changes.

In a scene with Buddy Ebsen near the water, Shirley was originally bare-chested. However, complaints from a woman's organization led to the scene being remade with Shirley wearing a top.

== See also ==
- Shirley Temple filmography
