= Fred Fishback =

Film director

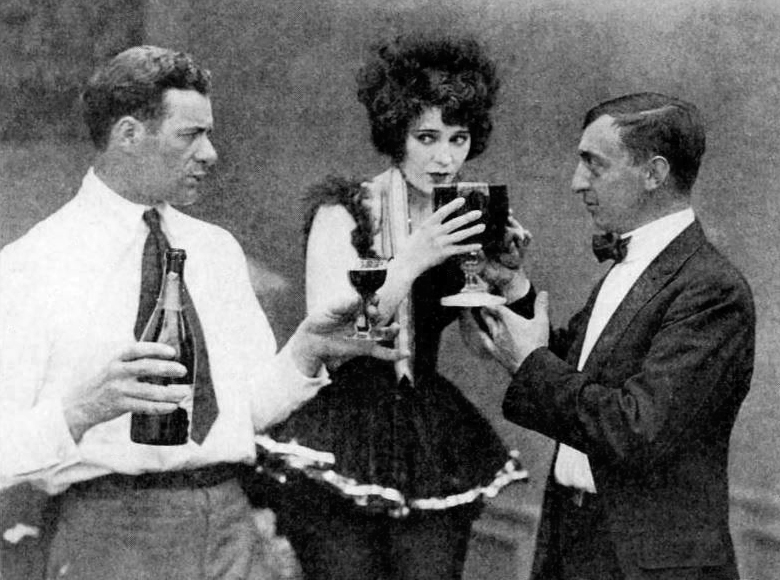
- Fred Fishback (left) and Edith Roberts in 1919
- Born: Moscu Fischback; January 18, 1894; Bucharest, Romania
- Died: January 6, 1925 (aged 30); Los Angeles, U.S.
- Other name: Fred Hibbard
- Occupations: Director; actor; screenwriter; producer
- Years active: 1912–1925
- Spouse: Ethel Lynne (married 1919–1925)

Fred C. Fishback (born Moscu Fischback; January 18, 1894 – January 6, 1925) was a film director, actor, screenwriter, and producer of the silent era. Following the 1921 scandal surrounding Roscoe Arbuckle, in which he was involved, Fishback worked mostly under the pseudonym Fred Hibbard.

== Biography ==
Fred Fishback was born Moscu Fischback (sometimes spelled Fischbach) on January 18, 1894, in Bucharest, Romania. He immigrated to the United States around 1900, and made his motion picture debut with Thomas H. Ince in 1912. As Freddy Fischbach, he became a cameraman at Mack Sennett's Keystone studio, where he worked with comedy star Roscoe Arbuckle. Sennett promoted Fischbach to director, with his surname Americanized to Fred Fishback.

Anyone with Keystone credentials was welcomed by lesser comedy studios, and Fishback secured a job directing comedy shorts for Universal Pictures, many of them featuring former Keystone and Hal Roach bit player Lige Conley.

Both Arbuckle and Fishback were hired to direct at Educational Pictures. Fishback, reunited with Lige Conley, helped to develop Conley into a comedy star in a lengthy series of slapstick short subjects. Fishback also directed one of Educational's leading comedians, Lloyd Hamilton. Fishback died at the age of 30 of cancer; his last films were released posthumously.

== Select filmography ==
=== Actor ===
Year	Title	Role	Notes
1914	Love and Bullets	Henchman	
1914	Laughing Gas	Bearded Patient	
1914	Tillie's Punctured Romance	Tall Servant	
1914	Killing Horace	Painter	
1914	Those Love Pangs	Vivian's Boyfriend	
1914	Gentlemen of Nerve	Spectator Behind Fence, Spectator in Bleachers	
1915	The Home Breakers	Lead Cop	
1915	A Bird's a Bird	Raffle Ticket Taker	
1915	That Little Band of Gold	Audience Member Near Box	
1915	Droppington's Devilish Deed	The Heavy Man	
1915	Do-Re-Me-Boom!	Cop	
1915	A Hash House Fraud	Free-Eater Hit with Plate	
1915	The Cannon Ball	Tall Henchman	
1915	Only a Messenger Boy	Man with Booze	
1915	A Janitors Wife's Temptation	Waiter in Booth Hall	
1915	The Hunt	Prisoner Who Escapes with Ford	

=== Director ===
Cameo by Fred Fishback (left), director of A Movie Star (1916)

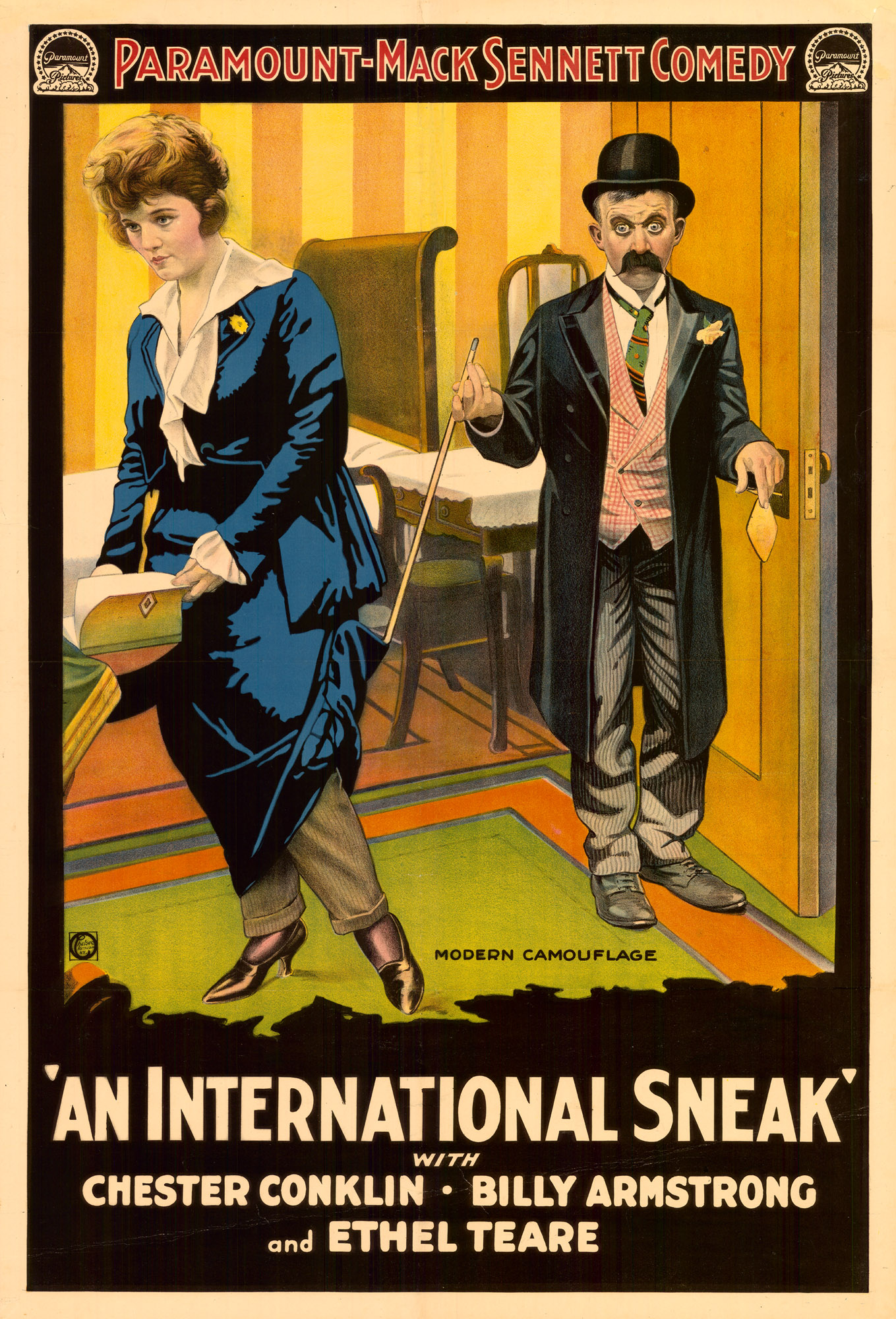
Poster for An International Sneak (1917)

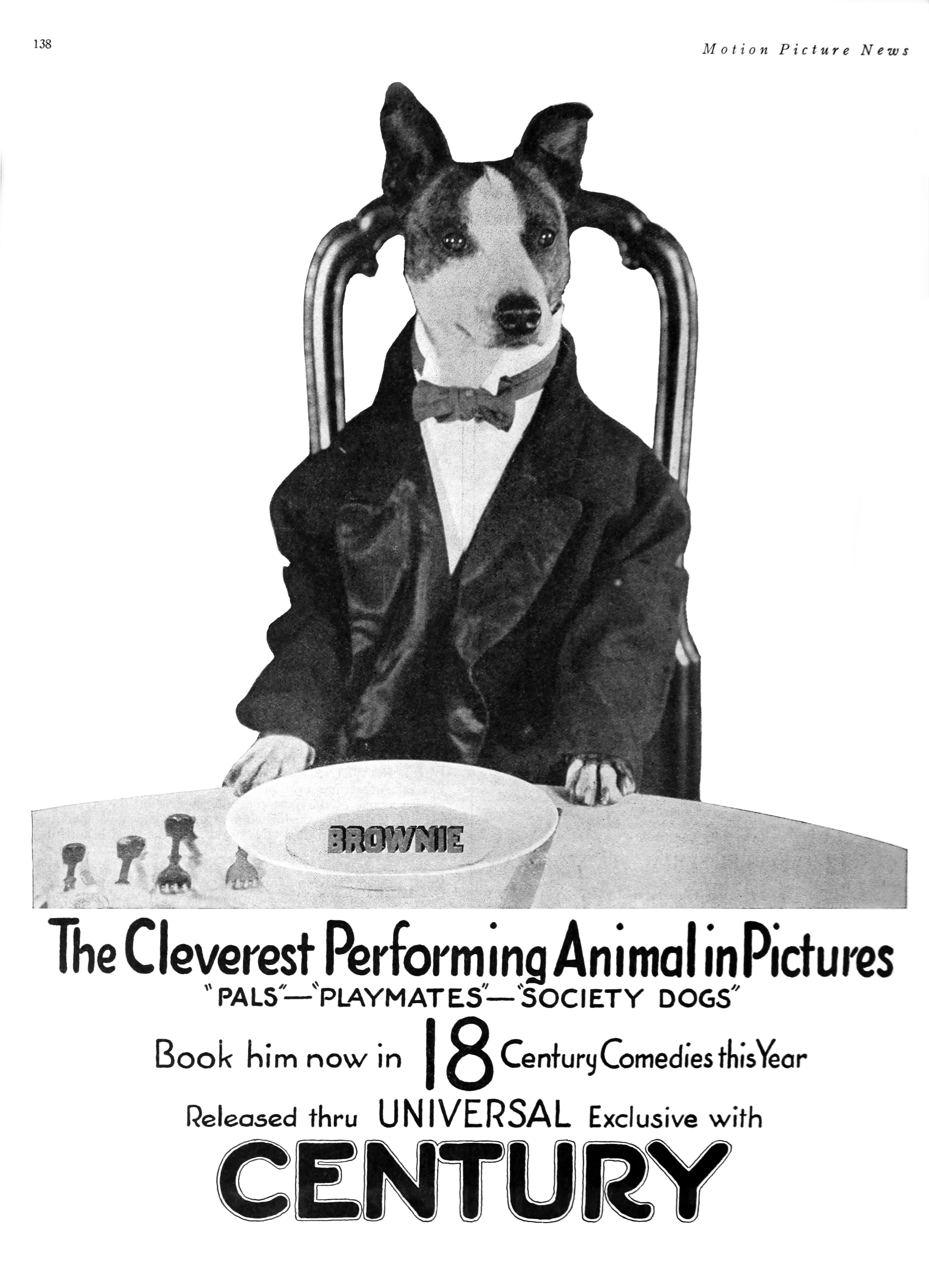
Advertisement for short films starring Brownie the dog, including Playmates and Society Dogs (1921)

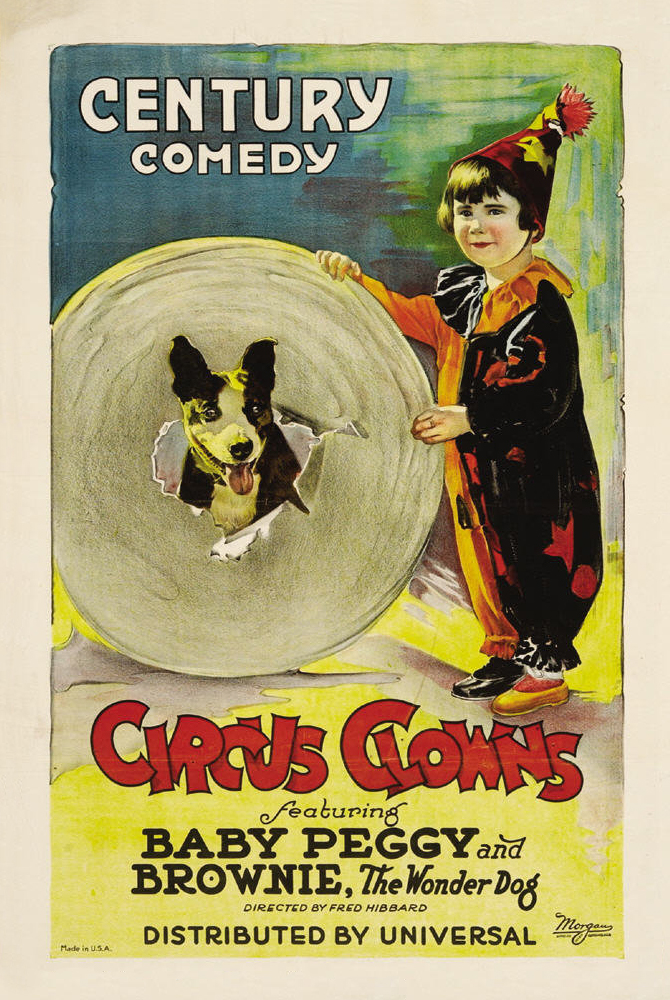
Poster for Circus Clowns (1922), with direction credited to Fred Hibbard and starring Baby Peggy.

Year	Title	Notes
1915	The Home Breakers	Assistant director
1915	A Bird's a Bird	Assistant director
1915	Droppington's Devilish Deed	Assistant director
1915	Do-Re-Me-Boom!	Assistant director
1915	A Hash House Fraud	Assistant director
1915	The Cannon Ball	Assistant director
1916	A Movie Star	
1916	His Auto Ruination	
1916	By Stork Delivery	
1916	His Bitter Pill	
1916	Ambrose's Cup of Woe	
1916	Madcap Ambrose	
1916	Ambrose's Rapid Rise	
1916	Safety First Ambrose	
1917	His Naughty Thought	
1917	Cactus Nell	
1917	Lost, a Cook	
1917	Roping Her Romeo	
1917	An International Sneak	
1918	Beware of Boarders!	
1918	Here Come the Girls	
1919	Money Talks	
1919	A Village Venus	
1920	His Master's Breath	Also screenwriter
1920	A Baby Doll Bandit	Also screenwriter
1920	Naughty Lions and Wild Men	Also screenwriter
1920	Over the Transom	Also screenwriter
1920	Loose Lions and Fast Lovers	Also screenwriter
1920	A Lion's Alliance	Also screenwriter
1920	My Dog Pal	Also screenwriter
1920	My Salomy Lions	Also screenwriter
1921	A Bunch of Kisses	Also screenwriter
1921	The Dog Doctor	Also screenwriter
1921	Playmates	Also screenwriter
1921	Alfalfa Love	Also screenwriter
1921	Society Dogs	Also screenwriter
1921	The Whizbang	Also screenwriter
1921	Brownie's Little Venus	Also screenwriter
1922	Circus Clowns	As Fred Hibbard; also screenwriter
1922	The Straphanger	Director and screenwriter
1923	Uncle Sam	As Fred Hibbard
1924	My Friend	As Fred Hibbard
1924	Air Pockets	As Fred Hibbard
1924	Killing Time	As Fred Hibbard
1924	Going East	As Fred Hibbard
1924	Jonah Jones	As Fred Hibbard
1924	Crushed	As Fred Hibbard
1925	Hooked	As Fred Hibbard; Also screenwriter; released posthumously
1925	Half a Hero	As Fred Hibbard; Also screenwriter; released posthumously
