= Brownie's Little Venus =

1921 film by Fred Hibbard

- Directed by: Fred Fishback
- Written by: Fred Fishback
- Starring: Baby Peggy, Brownie the Wonder Dog
- Production company: Century Film Company
- Release date: September 11, 1921 (premiere)
- Country: United States
- Language: Silent

Brownie's Little Venus is a 1921 American silent short film written and directed by Fred Fishback for Century Film Company and starring Baby Peggy and Brownie the Wonder Dog. It premiered at the Rivoli Theatre in New York City, New York, United States, on September 11, 1921. It was released nationwide on September 14, 1921.

== Cast ==
- Baby Peggy as Peggy
- Brownie the Wonder Dog as Brownie

== Preservation status ==
It was rediscovered in Switzerland in 2010.

It was preserved by the UCLA Library Film & Television Archive.
