= Brownie the Wonder Dog =

Dog actor that appeared in several American silent films

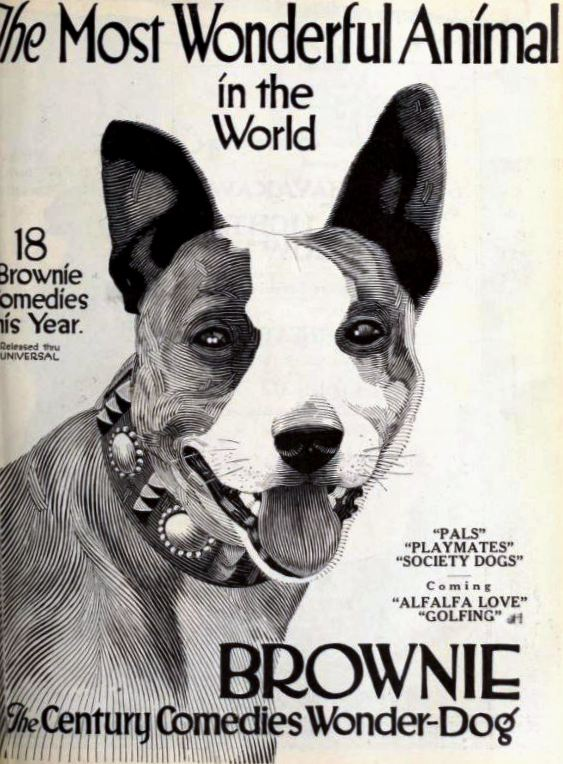
- 1921 advertisement
- Species: Dog
- Breed: Bull Terrier–Fox Terrier crossbreed
- Sex: Male
- Born: Brownie
- Occupation: Dog actor
- Years active: 1921–1923

Brownie the Wonder Dog was a 1920s dog actor that appeared in several American silent films, including Brownie's Little Venus (1921). He was signed under Century Film Company. Brownie was a Bull Terrier–Fox Terrier crossbreed.

Between 1926 and 1927 Jean d'Agraives and E. Nicolson created a comic strip in France, based on the film series, named Les Aventures du Chien Brownie.

== Career ==
Brownie was signed with a long-term contract with their trainer. During the starting point of being property for Century Films, the studio was in need of someone who could work with their canine actor, with the goal of making a duo centered on a series of comedies. Through newspaper accounts by The Philadelphia Inquirer, there were found reports of auditions being made to find a proper partner for Brownie.

The qualifications Century Films searched for was an actor that needed to be someone that was close to his size, and looked for children that had possessed spontaneity, coordination, the ability to take directions and be under three years old. He was partnered up with their selected child, named Diana Serra Cary, who popularly became known as Baby Peggy after they debuted together for the first time in a short film titled Playmates (1921). With them being presented as a natural duo, they continued to be cast together in other comedy centered films. His other notable appearance with Peggy was found in a short film titled Brownie's Little Venus (1921). He has some films where he is also not involved with Peggy, as he made an appearance in Some Class (1922), another comedy with the starring comedian and actor Johnny Fox, as well as "Society Dogs (1921). The studio gave its praises to Brownie for being so well trained and having a large collection of tricks that paired very well with their form of visual entertainment. He was able to grab and fetch human objects like hoses and candles, vault over and into high windows, as well as help dress and undress the child star Peggy in their shared films.

== Death and impact ==
According to an interview with Cary, Brownie unexpectedly died in his sleep 6 months after her career began, as the trainer was unable to wake him up one morning. The studio had concealed his age from the public, making the age he died unknown in order to preserve the image of youth they valued so much. Brownie's unexpected death had caused a small crisis for the studio, which made Century Films turn to create different comedies that were less child-oriented. The new direction came with a focus on satire and creating parodies of fairy tales. Baby Peggy would also stop taking sidekick roles to develop a unique pantomime talent that would boost her own career.

== Partial filmography ==
- Playmates (1921)
- Brownie's Little Venus (1921)
- Society Dogs (1921)
- Some Class (1922)
- Little Johnny Jones (1923)

== See also ==
- List of individual dogs
