= List of American films of 1916 =

America released more than 835 feature films and more than 4,100 short films (three reels or less) in the year 1916.

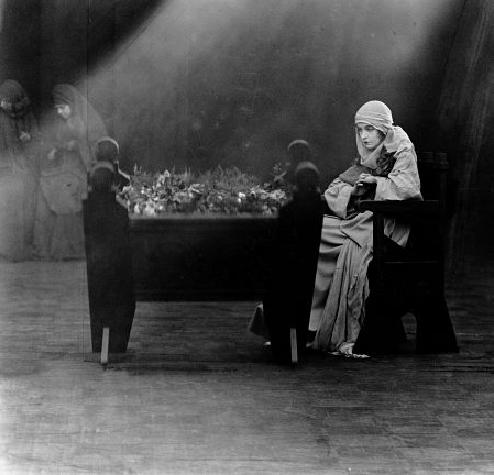
Intolerance

== A–B ==
Title	Director	Cast	Genre	Notes
20,000 Leagues Under the Sea	Stuart Paton	Jane Gail, Allen Holubar, Matt Moore	Action Adventure	Universal. Based on the novel by Jules Verne
The Abandonment	Donald MacDonald	Forrest Taylor, Harry von Meter, Helene Rosson	Drama	Mutual Film
According to the Code	E.H. Calvert	Lewis Stone, Marguerite Clayton	Drama	Essanay
Acquitted	Paul Powell	Wilfred Lucas, Mary Alden, Bessie Love	Mystery	Triangle Film
The Alibi	Paul Scardon	James Morrison, Stanley Walpole	Mystery	Vitagraph
Alien Souls	Frank Reicher	Sessue Hayakawa, Tsuru Aoki, Earle Foxe	Drama	Paramount
All Man	Emile Chautard	Robert Warwick, Mollie King, Gerda Holmes	Western	World Film
The Almighty Dollar	Robert Thornby	June Elvidge, Frances Nelson	Drama	World Film
Ambition	James Vincent	Bertha Kalich, William H. Tooker	Drama	Fox Film
American Aristocracy	Lloyd Ingraham	Douglas Fairbanks, Jewel Carmen	Adventure comedy	Triangle Film
The American Beauty	William Desmond Taylor	Myrtle Stedman, Elliott Dexter	Drama	Paramount
The Americano	John Emerson	Douglas Fairbanks, Alma Rubens, Alan Hale	Adventure	Triangle Film
Anton the Terrible	William C. deMille	Theodore Roberts, Anita King	Drama	Paramount
The Apostle of Vengeance	Clifford Smith	William S. Hart, John Gilbert	Drama	Triangle Film
April	Donald MacDonald	Helene Rosson, Forrest Taylor, Harry von Meter	Drama	Mutual Film
Arms and the Woman	George Fitzmaurice	Mary Nash, Lumsden Hare	Drama	Pathe Exchange
Artie, the Millionaire Kid	Harry Handworth	Ernest Truex, Dorothy Kelly	Comedy	Vitagraph
The Aryan	William S. Hart	William S. Hart, Louise Glaum, Bessie Love	Western drama	Triangle Film
As a Woman Sows	William F. Haddock	Gertrude Robinson, Alexander Gaden	Drama	Mutual Film
As in a Looking Glass	Frank Hall Crane	Kitty Gordon, Lumsden Hare	Drama	World Film
Ashes of Embers	Joseph Kaufman, Edward Jose	Pauline Frederick, Earle Foxe	Drama	Paramount
Atta Boy's Last Race	George Siegmann	Dorothy Gish, Carl Stockdale	Drama	Triangle Film
The Awakening of Helena Richie	John W. Noble	Ethel Barrymore, Frank Montgomery	Drama	Metro
At Piney Ridge	William Robert Daly	Fritzi Brunette, Vivian Reed	Drama	Selig
Audrey	Robert G. Vignola	Pauline Frederick, Charles Waldron	Drama	Paramount
Autumn	O.A.C. Lund	Violet Mersereau, Paul Panzer	Adventure	Universal
The Ballet Girl	George Irving	Alice Brady, Holbrook Blinn	Drama	World Film
Barriers of Society	Lloyd B. Carleton	Dorothy Davenport, Emory Johnson	Drama	Universal
The Battle of Hearts	Oscar Apfel	William Farnum, Hedda Hopper	Drama	Fox Film
The Battle of Life	James Vincent	Art Acord, Richard Neill	Crime	Fox Film
The Beast	Richard Stanton	George Walsh, Anna Luther, Alan Hale	Comedy	Fox Film
The Beckoning Trail	Jack Conway	J. Warren Kerrigan, Maude George	Thriller	Universal
The Beggar of Cawnpore	Charles Swickard	H.B. Warner, Lola May, Wyndham Standing	Historical	Triangle Film
Behind the Lines	Henry MacRae	Edith Johnson, Harry Carey, Ruth Clifford	Drama	Universal
Ben Blair	William Desmond Taylor	Dustin Farnum, Winifred Kingston, Herbert Standing	Drama	Paramount
Bettina Loved a Soldier	Rupert Julian	Louise Lovely, George Berrell, Rupert Julian	Comedy	Universal
Betty of Greystone	Allan Dwan	Dorothy Gish, Owen Moore	Drama	Triangle Film
Beyond the Wall	Travers Vale	Ethel Clayton, Carlyle Blackwell	Drama	World Film
Big Jim Garrity	George Fitzmaurice	Robert Edeson, Carl Harbaugh	Drama	Pathe Exchange
The Big Sister	John B. O'Brien	Mae Murray, Ida Darling	Drama	Paramount
Big Tremaine	Henry Otto	Harold Lockwood, May Allison, Lester Cuneo	Romance	Metro
The Black Butterfly	Burton L. King	Olga Petrova, Mahlon Hamilton	Drama	Metro
The Black Crook	Robert G. Vignola	Edward P. Sullivan, Gladys Coburn	Drama	Kalemn
Black Friday	Lloyd B. Carleton	Dorothy Davenport, Emory Johnson	Drama	Universal
The Black Sheep of the Family	Jay Hunt	Francelia Billington, Francelia Billington, Jack Holt	Drama	Universal
The Blacklist	William C. de Mille	Blanche Sweet, Ernest Joy	Drama	Paramount
Blazing Love	Kenean Buel	Virginia Pearson, Louise Huff	Drama	Fox Film
Blue Blood and Red	Raoul Walsh	George Walsh, Doris Pawn	Comedy	Fox Film
The Blue Envelope Mystery	Wilfrid North	Lillian Walker, Charles Kent	Mystery	Vitagraph
Bobbie of the Ballet	Joseph De Grasse	Louise Lovely, Lon Chaney, Jay Belasco	Drama	Universal
The Bondman	Edgar Lewis	William Farnum, Dorothy Bernard, L.O. Hart	Drama	Fox Film. Based on the novel by Hall Caine
Bought and Paid For	William C. deMille	Agnes Ayres, Jack Holt	Drama	World Film
The Brand of Cowardice	John W. Noble	Lionel Barrymore, Grace Valentine	Drama	Metro
Britton of the Seventh	Lionel Belmore	Charles Kent, Eulalie Jensen, Bobby Connelly	Western	Vitagraph
Broken Fetters	Rex Ingram	Kittens Reichert, Violet Mersereau	Comedy	Universal
The Bruiser	Charles Bartlett	Charlotte Burton, William Russell, George Ferguson, Lizette Thorne	Drama	Mutual Film
The Bugle Call	Reginald Barker	William Collier Jr., Wyndham Standing, Anna Lehr	Western	Triangle Film
The Bugler of Algiers	Rupert Julian	Ella Hall, Kingsley Benedict	Action	Universal
Bullets and Brown Eyes	Scott Sidney	William Desmond, Bessie Barriscale, Wyndham Standing	Drama	Triangle Film

== C–D ==
Title	Director	Cast	Genre	Notes
The Call of the Cumberlands	Frank Lloyd	Dustin Farnum, Winifred Kingston, Herbert Standing	Drama	Paramount
Caprice of the Mountains	John G. Adolfi	June Caprice, Albert Gran	Drama	Fox Film
Captain Jinks of the Horse Marines	Fred E. Wright	Richard Travers, Ann Murdock, Edmund Cobb	Comedy	Essanay
The Captive God	Charles Swickard	William S. Hart, Enid Markey	Adventure	Triangle Film
Casey at the Bat	Lloyd Ingraham	DeWolf Hopper, Carl Stockdale, Marguerite Marsh	Sport	Triangle Film
The Chain Invisible	Frank Powell	Bruce McRae, Gerda Holmes	Drama	World Film
The Chalice of Sorrow	Rex Ingram	Cleo Madison, Charles Cummings	Drama	Universal
The Challenge	Donald MacKenzie	Montagu Love, Helene Chadwick	Drama	Pathe Exchange
The Chaperon	Arthur Berthelet	Edna Mayo, Eugene O'Brien	Comedy	Essanay
The Chattel	Frederick A. Thomson	Peggy Hyland, Charles Kent	Drama	Vitagraph
The Child of Destiny	William Nigh	Irene Fenwick, Robert Elliott	Drama	Metro
A Child of Mystery	Hobart Henley	Gertrude Selby, Alfred Allen	Mystery	Universal
A Child of the Paris Streets	Lloyd Ingraham	Mae Marsh, Carl Stockdale	Drama	Triangle Film
The Children in the House	Sidney Franklin	Norma Talmadge, Eugene Pallette	Drama	Triangle Film
Children of the Feud	Joseph Henabery	Charles Gorman, Dorothy Gish	Drama	Triangle Film
A Circus Romance	Charles M. Seay	Muriel Ostriche, Catherine Doucet	Drama	World Film
The City of Failing Light	George Terwilliger	Herbert Fortier, Octavia Handworth	Drama	Lubin
Civilization	Reginald Barker	Howard C. Hickman, Enid Markey, George Fisher	Drama	Triangle Film
Civilization's Child	Charles Giblyn	William H. Thompson, Anna Lehr, Jack Standing	Drama	Triangle Film
The Clarion	James Durkin	Carlyle Blackwell, Howard Hall	Drama	World Film
The Closed Road	Maurice Tourneur	House Peters, Barbara Tennant	Drama	World Film
The Clown	William C. deMille	Victor Moore, Thomas Meighan, Ernest Joy	Drama	Paramount
The Code of Marcia Gray	Frank Lloyd	Constance Collier, Forrest Stanley	Crime	Paramount
The Colored American Winning His Suit		Thomas M. Mosley, Ida Askins	Drama	Frederick Douglass Film Company
The Combat	Ralph Ince	Anita Stewart, John S. Robertson	Drama	Vitagraph
The Come-Back	Fred J. Balshofer	Harold Lockwood, May Allison	Drama	Metro
Common Ground	William C. deMille	Marie Doro, Thomas Meighan	Drama	Paramount
The Common Law	Albert Capellani	Clara Kimball Young, Conway Tearle, Paul Capellani	Drama	Selznick
A Coney Island Princess	Dell Henderson	Irene Fenwick, Owen Moore	Comedy	Paramount
The Conflict	Ralph Ince	Lucille Lee Stewart, Huntley Gordon	Drama	Vitagraph
The Conqueror	Reginald Barker	Willard Mack, Enid Markey	Drama	Triangle Film
The Conquest of Canaan	George Irving	Edith Taliaferro, Jack Sherrill	Drama	World Film
The Corner	Walter Edwards	George Fawcett, Willard Mack, Clara Williams	Drama	Triangle Film
A Corner in Colleens	Charles Miller	Bessie Barriscale, Charles Ray	Comedy	Triangle Film
A Corner in Cotton	Fred J. Balshofer	Marguerite Snow, William Clifford	Drama	Metro
The Cossack Whip	John H. Collins	Viola Dana, Frank Farrington	Drama	Edison
The Country That God Forgot	Marshall Neilan	Tom Santschi, Mary Charleson, Charles K. Gerrard	Drama	Selig
The Courtesan	Arthur Maude	Eugenie Forde, Hallam Cooley	Drama	Mutual Film
The Craving	Charles Bartlett	Charlotte Burton, William Russell, Helene Rosson	Drama	Mutual Film
The Criminal	Reginald Barker	Clara Williams, William Desmond	Drama	Triangle Film
The Crippled Hand	Robert Z. Leonard	Ella Hall, Gladys Brockwell	Drama	Universal
The Crisis	Colin Campbell	George Fawcett, Bessie Eyton, Marshall Neilan	Historical	Selig
The Crucial Test	John Ince, Robert Thornby	Kitty Gordon, Niles Welch	Drama	World Film
The Cycle of Fate	Marshall Neilan	Edith Johnson, Lew Cody	Drama	Selig
Daphne and the Pirate	Christy Cabanne	Lillian Gish, Elliott Dexter	Drama	Triangle Film
Daredevil Kate	Kenean Buel	Virginia Pearson, Victor Sutherland	Drama	Fox Film
The Daring of Diana	S. Rankin Drew	Anita Stewart, Anders Randolf	Drama	Vitagraph
The Dark Silence	Albert Capellani	Clara Kimball Young, Paul Capellani	Drama	World Film
The Daughter of MacGregor	Sidney Olcott	Valentine Grant, Sidney Mason	Comedy	Paramount
A Daughter of the Gods	Herbert Brenon	Annette Kellerman, Hal De Forrest, Stuart Holmes	Drama	Fox Film
David Garrick	Frank Lloyd	Dustin Farnum, Winifred Kingston, Herbert Standing	Historical	Paramount
Davy Crockett	William Desmond Taylor	Dustin Farnum, Winifred Kingston	Western	Paramount
The Dawn Maker	William S. Hart	William S. Hart, William Desmond	Western	Triangle Film
The Dawn of Freedom	Theodore Marston, Paul Scardon	Charles Richman, Arline Pretty, Joseph Kilgour	Drama	Vitagraph
The Dawn of Love	Edwin Carewe	Mabel Taliaferro, Robert Frazer	Drama	Metro
The Decoy	George W. Lederer	Frances Nelson, Gladden James	Crime	Mutual Film
The Deserter	Walter Edwards	Charles Ray, Wedgwood Nowell	Western	Triangle Film
Destiny's Toy	John B. O'Brien	Louise Huff, John Bowers	Drama	Paramount
The Destroyers	Ralph Ince	Lucille Lee Stewart, Huntley Gordon, John S. Robertson	Drama	Vitagraph
The Devil at His Elbow	Burton L. King	Clifford Bruce, Dorothy Green, Adolphe Menjou	Drama	Metro
The Devil's Bondwoman	Lloyd B. Carleton	Dorothy Davenport, Emory Johnson	Drama	Universal
The Devil's Double	William S. Hart	William S. Hart, Enid Markey	Western	Triangle Film
The Devil's Needle	Chester Withey	Norma Talmadge, Tully Marshall, Marguerite Marsh	Drama	Triangle Film
The Devil's Prize	Marguerite Bertsch	Antonio Moreno, Naomi Childers	Drama	Vitagraph
The Devil's Toy	Harley Knoles	Adele Blood, Edwin Stevens, Montagu Love	Drama	World Film
The Diamond Runners	J.P. McGowan	Helen Holmes, Leo D. Maloney	Crime	Mutual Film
Diane of the Follies	Christy Cabanne	Lillian Gish, Sam De Grasse	Drama	Triangle Film
Dimples	Edgar Jones	Mary Miles Minter, Peggy Hopkins Joyce	Drama	Metro
Diplomacy	Sidney Olcott	Marie Doro, Elliott Dexter	Drama	Paramount
The Discard	Lawrence C. Windom	Virginia Hammond, Ernest Maupain	Drama	Essanay
The Dividend	Walter Edwards, Thomas H. Ince	William H. Thompson, Charles Ray	Drama	Triangle Film
Divorce and the Daughter	Frederick Sullivan	Florence La Badie, Edwin Stanley, Ethelmary Oakland	Drama	Pathe Exchange
Doctor Neighbor	Lloyd B. Carleton	Hobart Bosworth, Dorothy Davenport, Emory Johnson	Drama	Universal
The Dollar and the Law	Wilfrid North	Lillian Walker, Walter McGrail	Drama	Vitagraph
Dollars and the Woman	Joseph Kaufman	Tom Moore, Ethel Clayton, Crauford Kent	Drama	Lubin
Dorian's Divorce	O.A.C. Lund	Lionel Barrymore, Grace Valentine	Drama	Metro
The Dragon	Harry A. Pollard	Margarita Fischer, Catherine Doucet	Drama	World Film
The Dream Girl	Cecil B. DeMille	Mae Murray, Theodore Roberts, Earle Foxe	Drama	Paramount
A Dream or Two Ago	James Kirkwood Sr.,	Mary Miles Minter, Lizette Thorne	Drama	Mutual Film
The Drifter	Richard Garrick	Alexander Gaden, Iva Shepard	Drama	Mutual Film
Drugged Waters	William C. Dowlan	George Berrell, Lule Warrenton	Drama	Universal
Dulcie's Adventure	James Kirkwood Sr.	Mary Miles Minter, Bessie Banks, Marie Van Tassell, Harry von Meter	Drama	Mutual Film
The Dumb Girl of Portici	Phillips Smalley, Lois Weber	Anna Pavlova, Rupert Julian, Jack Holt	Historical	Universal
The Dupe	Frank Reicher	Blanche Sweet, Ernest Joy	Drama	Paramount
Dust	Edward Sloman	Winifred Greenwood, Harry von Meter	Drama	Mutual Film

== E–F ==
Title	Director	Cast	Genre	Notes
Each Pearl a Tear	George Melford	Fannie Ward, Charles Clary	Drama	Paramount
The Eagle's Wings	Robert Z. Leonard	Vola Vale, Herbert Rawlinson	Drama	Universal
East Lynne	Bertram Bracken	Theda Bara, Stuart Holmes, Claire Whitney	Drama	Fox Film
Elusive Isabel	Stuart Paton	Florence Lawrence, Sidney Bracey	Drama	Universal
The End of the Rainbow	Jeanie Macpherson, Lynn Reynolds	Myrtle Gonzalez, Val Paul	Drama	Universal
The End of the Trail	Oscar Apfel	Gladys Brockwell, William Farnum, Elinor Fair	Drama	Fox Film
An Enemy to the King	Frederick A. Thomson	E.H. Sothern, Edith Storey, John S. Robertson	Historical	Vitagraph
The Eternal Grind	John B. O'Brien	Mary Pickford, Loretta Blake	Drama	Paramount
The Eternal Question	Burton L. King	Olga Petrova, Mahlon Hamilton	Drama	Metro
The Eternal Sapho	Bertram Bracken	Theda Bara, George MacQuarrie	Drama	Fox Film
The Evil Thereof	Robert G. Vignola	Frank Losee, Grace Valentine, Crauford Kent	Drama	Paramount
The Evil Women Do	Rupert Julian	Elsie Jane Wilson, Francelia Billington	Drama	Universal
Extravagance	Burton L. King	Olga Petrova, Mahlon Hamilton	Comedy drama	Metro
The Eye of God	Phillips Smalley, Lois Weber	Tyrone Power Sr., Charles Gunn	Drama	Universal
Eye of the Night	Walter Edwards	William H. Thompson, Margery Wilson	Drama	Triangle Film
Faith	James Kirkwood	Mary Miles Minter, Clarence Burton	Drama	Mutual Film
The Fall of a Nation	Thomas Dixon, Jr.	Lorraine Huling, Percy Standing	Drama	Vitagraph
Fate's Boomerang	Frank Hall Crane	Mollie King, June Elvidge	Drama	World Film
Fathers of Men	William J. Humphrey	Robert Edeson, Naomi Childers	Drama	Vitagraph
The Fear of Poverty	Frederic Richard Sullivan	Florence La Badie, Edwin Stanley	Drama	Pathe Exchange
The Feast of Life	Albert Capellani	Clara Kimball Young, Doris Kenyon	Drama	World Film
Feathertop	Henry J. Vernot	Marguerite Courtot, Sidney Mason	Drama	Mutual Film
The Feud Girl	Frederick A. Thomson	Hazel Dawn, Irving Cummings	Drama	Paramount
Fifty-Fifty	Allan Dwan	Norma Talmadge, Harry Northrup	Drama	Triangle Film
Fighting Blood	Oscar Apfel	William Farnum, Dorothy Bernard	Drama	Fox Film
The Fires of Conscience	Oscar Apfel	William Farnum, Gladys Brockwell,	Drama	Fox Film
The Five Faults of Flo	George Foster Platt	Florence La Badie, Grace DeCarlton	Drama	Mutual Film
The Flames of Johannis	Edgar Lewis	Nance O'Neil, Victor Sutherland	Drama	Lubin
The Flight of the Duchess	Eugene Nowland	Gladys Hulette, Barnett Parker	Comedy	Mutual Film
The Flirt	Phillips Smalley, Lois Weber	Marie Walcamp, Antrim Short	Drama	Universal
Flirting with Fate	Christy Cabanne	Douglas Fairbanks, Jewel Carmen, George Beranger	Comedy	Triangle Film
The Flower of No Man's Land	John H. Collins	Viola Dana, Duncan McRae	Drama	Metro
The Flying Torpedo	John B. O'Brien, Christy Cabanne	John Emerson, Spottiswoode Aitken, Bessie Love	Drama	Triangle Film
The Fool's Revenge	Will S. Davis	William H. Tooker, Richard Neill, Ruth Findlay	Drama	Fox Film
The Foolish Virgin	Albert Capellani	Clara Kimball Young, Conway Tearle, Paul Capellani	Drama	Selznick
The Footlights of Fate	William J. Humphrey	Naomi Childers, Marc McDermott	Drama	Vitagraph
For a Woman's Fair Name	Harry Davenport	Robert Edeson, Eulalie Jensen	Drama	Vitagraph
For the Defense	Frank Reicher	Fannie Ward, James Neill	Drama	Paramount
The Foundling	John B. O'Brien	Mary Pickford, Edward Martindel	Drama	Paramount
The Fourth Estate	Frank Powell	Clifford Bruce, Alfred Hickman	Drama	Fox Film
Friday the 13th	Emile Chautard	Robert Warwick, Montagu Love	Drama	World Film
From Broadway to a Throne	William Bowman	Carter DeHaven, Walter Belasco, Duke Worne	Drama	Universal
Fruits of Desire	Oscar Eagle	Robert Warwick, Madlaine Traverse	Drama	World Film
The Fugitive	Frederic Richard Sullivan	Florence La Badie, Hector Dion	Drama	Pathe Exchange

== G–H ==
Title	Director	Cast	Genre	Notes
A Gamble in Souls	Walter Edwards	William Desmond, Dorothy Dalton	Drama	Triangle Film
The Garden of Allah	Colin Campbell	Helen Ware, Tom Santschi	Drama	Selig
The Gates of Eden	John H. Collins	Viola Dana, Augustus Phillips	Drama	Metro
The Gay Lord Waring	Otis Turner	J. Warren Kerrigan, Lois Wilson, Bertram Grassby	Drama	Universal
The Gilded Cage	Harley Knowles	Alice Brady, Gerda Holmes, Montagu Love	Drama	World Film
The Gilded Spider	Joseph De Grasse	Lon Chaney, Louise Lovely	Drama	Universal
The Girl of Lost Lake	Lynn Reynolds	Myrtle Gonzalez, Val Paul	Drama	Universal
The Girl Philippa	S. Rankin Drew	Anita Stewart, Frank Morgan	Drama	Vitagraph
Gloriana	E. Mason Hopper	Zoe Rae, Clarissa Selwynne	Drama	Universal
God's Country and the Woman	Rollin S. Sturgeon	William Duncan, Nell Shipman, George Holt	Drama	Vitagraph
God's Half Acre	Edwin Carewe	Mabel Taliaferro, Jack W. Johnston	Drama	Metro
Going Straight	Sidney Franklin	Norma Talmadge, Ralph Lewis	Drama	Triangle Film
Gold and the Woman	James Vincent	Theda Bara, Alma Hanlon	Drama	Fox Film
The Good Bad-Man	Allan Dwan	Douglas Fairbanks, Sam De Grasse	Western	Triangle Film
The Grasp of Greed	Joseph De Grasse	Lon Chaney, Louise Lovely, Jay Belasco	Drama	Universal
The Great Problem	Rex Ingram	Violet Mersereau, Mathilde Brundage	Drama	Universal
The Green-Eyed Monster	J. Gordon Edwards	Robert B. Mantell, Genevieve Hamper, Stuart Holmes	Drama	Fox Film
Green Stockings	Wilfrid North	Lillian Walker, Frank Currier	Comedy	Vitagraph
The Green Swamp	Scott Sidney	Bessie Barriscale, Bruce McRae	Drama	Triangle Film
Gretchen the Greenhorn	Sidney Franklin, Chester Franklin	Dorothy Gish, Ralph Lewis, Elmo Lincoln	Drama	Triangle Film
A Gutter Magdalene	George Melford	Fannie Ward, Charles West	Drama	Paramount
The Habit of Happiness	Allan Dwan	Douglas Fairbanks, George Fawcett	Comedy	Triangle Film
Half a Rogue	Henry Otto	King Baggot, Clara Beyers	Romance	Universal
The Half-Breed	Allan Dwan	Douglas Fairbanks, Alma Rubens, Sam De Grasse	Western	Triangle Film
The Half Million Bribe	Edgar Jones	Hamilton Revelle, Marguerite Snow	Drama	Metro
The Hand of Peril	Maurice Tourneur	House Peters, June Elvidge	Crime	World Film
The Haunted Manor	Edwin Middleton	Earl Schenck, Iva Shepard	Drama	Mutual Film
Hazel Kirke	Louis J. Gasnier	Pearl White, Riley Hatch, Creighton Hale	Drama	Pathe Exchange
He Fell in Love with His Wife	William Desmond Taylor	Florence Rockwell, Forrest Stanley	Drama	Paramount
The Heart of a Hero	Emile Chautard	Robert Warwick, Gail Kane	Historical	World Film
The Heart of the Hills	Richard Ridgely	Mabel Trunnelle, Conway Tearle	Drama	Edison
The Heart of Nora Flynn	Cecil B. DeMille	Marie Doro, Elliott Dexter	Drama	Paramount
The Heart of Paula	Julia Crawford Ivers, William Desmond Taylor	Lenore Ulric, Forrest Stanley, Herbert Standing	Drama	Paramount
The Heir to the Hoorah	William C. deMille	Thomas Meighan, Anita King	Drama	Paramount
The Heiress at Coffee Dan's	Edward Dillon	Bessie Love, Carmel Myers	Comedy drama	Triangle
Hell's Hinges	William S. Hart, Charles Swickard	William S. Hart, Clara Williams, Jack Standing	Western	Triangle Film
lenhelene Hell-to-Pay Austin	Paul Powell	Wilfred Lucas, Bessie Love, Eugene Pallette	Comedy drama	Triangle Film
Her Bitter Cup	Joe King, Cleo Madison	Adele Farrington, William V. Mong	Drama	Universal
Her Debt of Honor	William Nigh	Valli Valli, William B. Davidson, Mathilde Brundage	Drama	Metro
Her Double Life	J. Gordon Edwards	Theda Bara, Stuart Holmes	Drama	Fox Film
Her Father's Son	William Desmond Taylor	Vivian Martin, Gayne Whitman, Herbert Standing	Comedy	Paramount
Her Great Price	Edwin Carewe	Mabel Taliaferro, George Pauncefort	Drama	Metro
Her Maternal Right	John Ince, Robert Thornby	Kitty Gordon, Zena Keefe	Drama	World Film
Her Surrender	Ivan Abramson	Anna Q. Nilsson, William H. Tooker	Drama	Independent
The Heritage of Hate	Burton George	William Quinn, Eileen Sedgwick	Drama	Universal
The Hero of Submarine D-2	Paul Scardon	Charles Richman, Anders Randolf	War	Vitagraph
Hesper of the Mountains	Wilfrid North	Lillian Walker, Donald MacBride	Drama	Vitagraph
The Hidden Scar	Barry O'Neil	Ethel Clayton, Holbrook Blinn, Irving Cummings	Drama	World Film
The Hidden Valley	Ernest C. Warde	Valda Valkyrien, Boyd Marshall	Adventure	Pathe Exchange
The Highest Bid	William Russell	William Russell, Charlotte Burton	Drama	Mutual Film
His Brother's Wife	Harley Knoles	Carlyle Blackwell, Ethel Clayton	Drama	World Film
His Picture in the Papers	John Emerson	Douglas Fairbanks, Loretta Blake	Comedy	Triangle Film
His Wife's Good Name	Ralph Ince	Lucille Lee Stewart, Huntley Gordon	Drama	Vitagraph
Home	Raymond B. West	Bessie Barriscale, Charles Ray, Clara Williams	Comedy drama	Triangle Film
The Honor of Mary Blake	Edwin Stevens	Violet Mersereau, James O'Neill	Drama	Universal
Honor Thy Name	Charles Giblyn	Frank Keenan, Charles Ray	Drama	Triangle Film
Honor's Altar	Walter Edwards	Bessie Barriscale, Lewis Stone	Drama	Triangle Film
The Honorable Algy	Raymond B. West	Charles Ray, Margery Wilson	Comedy	Triangle Film
The Honorable Friend	Edward LeSaint	Sessue Hayakawa, Tsuru Aoki, Raymond Hatton	Drama	Paramount
Hoodoo Ann	Lloyd Ingraham	Mae Marsh, Robert Harron, Wilbur Higby	Comedy drama	Triangle Film
Hop, the Devil's Brew	Lois Weber, Phillips Smalley	Phillips Smalley, Lois Weber	Drama	Universal
The House Built Upon Sand	Edward Morrissey	Lillian Gish, Roy Stewart	Drama	Triangle Film
The House of Lies	William Desmond Taylor	Edna Goodrich, Kathleen Kirkham	Drama	Paramount
The House of Mirrors	Marshall Farnum	Lillian Kemble-Cooper, J. Frank Glendon	Drama	Mutual Film
The House with the Golden Windows	George Melford	Wallace Reid, Cleo Ridgely, Marjorie Daw	Drama	Paramount
Hulda from Holland	John B. O'Brien	Mary Pickford, Frank Losee	Drama	Paramount
Human Driftwood	Emile Chautard	Robert Warwick, Frances Nelson, Leonore Harris	Drama	World Film
The Hunted Woman	S. Rankin Drew	Virginia Pearson, Frank Currier	Drama	Vitagraph
A Huntress of Men	Lucius Henderson	Mary Fuller, Joseph W. Girard	Drama	Universal
Husband and Wife	Barry O'Neil	Ethel Clayton, Holbrook Blinn, Montagu Love	Drama	World Film
Hypocrisy	Kenean Buel	Virginia Pearson, Ida Darling	Drama	Fox Film

== I–J ==
Title	Director	Cast	Genre	Notes
I Accuse	William F. Haddock	Alexander Gaden, Helen Marten	Drama	Mutual Film
Idle Wives	Lois Weber, Phillips Smalley	Mary MacLaren, Maude George	Drama	Universal
The Idol of the Stage	Richard Garrick	Malcolm Williams, Helen Marten	Drama	Mutual Film
If My Country Should Call	Joseph De Grasse	Dorothy Phillips, Lon Chaney	Drama	Universal
Immediate Lee	Frank Borzage	Frank Borzage, Ann Little	Drama	Mutual Film
In the Diplomatic Service	Francis X. Bushman	Francis X. Bushman, Beverly Bayne, Helen Dunbar	Comedy drama	Metro
The Innocence of Lizette	James Kirkwood Sr.	Mary Miles Minter, Harvey Clark	Comedy drama	Mutual Film
The Innocence of Ruth	John H. Collins	Edward Earle, Viola Dana, Augustus Phillips	Drama	Edison
The Innocent Lie	Sidney Olcott	Valentine Grant, Jack J. Clark	Drama	Paramount
An Innocent Magdalene	Allan Dwan	Lillian Gish, Spottiswoode Aitken	Drama	Triangle Film
An International Marriage	Frank Lloyd	Rita Jolivet, Marc Robbins, Elliott Dexter	Comedy	Paramount
Intolerance	D. W. Griffith	Mae Marsh, Robert Harron, Constance Talmadge, Lillian Gish	Epic drama	Triangle Film
The Intrigue	Frank Lloyd	Lenore Ulric, Florence Vidor	Drama	Paramount
The Iron Hand	Ulysses Davis	Edward Clark, Hobart Bosworth, Jane Novak	Drama	Universal
The Iron Woman	Carl Harbaugh	Nance O'Neil, Evelyn Brent	Drama	Metro
The Island of Surprise	Paul Scardon	William Courtenay, Charles Kent, Anders Randolf	Drama	Vitagraph
The Isle of Life	Burton George	Hayward Mack, Eileen Sedgwick	Adventure	Universal
It Happened in Honolulu	Lynn Reynolds	Myrtle Gonzalez, Val Paul	Comedy	Universal
Jaffery	George Irving	C. Aubrey Smith, Florence Deshon	Drama	Independent
Jealousy	Will S. Davis	Valeska Suratt, Claire Whitney	Drama	Fox Film
Jim Grimsby's Boy	Reginald Barker	Frank Keenan, Enid Markey	Western	Triangle Film
Joan the Woman	Cecil B. DeMille	Geraldine Farrar, Raymond Hatton, Wallace Reid	Historical	Paramount
John Needham's Double	Phillips Smalley, Lois Weber	Tyrone Power Sr., Marie Walcamp	Drama	Universal
Joy and the Dragon	Henry King	Marie Osborne, Mollie McConnell, Cullen Landis	Drama	Pathe Exchange
Judith of the Cumberlands	J.P. McGowan	Helen Holmes, Leo D. Maloney	Drama	Mutual Film
The Jungle Child	Walter Edwards	Dorothy Dalton, Howard Hickman	Drama	Triangle Film

== K–L ==
Title	Director	Cast	Genre	Notes
Kennedy Square	S. Rankin Drew	Charles Kent, Antonio Moreno, Muriel Ostriche	Drama	Vitagraph
The Kid	Wilfrid North	Lillian Walker, Eulalie Jensen	Drama	Vitagraph
Kinkaid, Gambler	Raymond Wells	Ruth Stonehouse, Noble Johnson	Crime	Universal
The King's Game	Ashley Miller	Pearl White, Sheldon Lewis	Comedy	Pathe Exchange
King Lear	Ernest C. Warde	Frederick Warde, Lorraine Huling	Drama	Pathe Exchange
The Kiss	Dell Henderson	Owen Moore, Marguerite Courtot, Kate Lester	Comedy	Paramount
The Kiss of Hate	William Nigh	Ethel Barrymore, Niles Welch	Drama	Metro
A Knight of the Range	Jacques Jaccard	Harry Carey, Olive Carey, Hoot Gibson	Western	Universal
La Bohème	Albert Capellani	Alice Brady, Paul Capellani, June Elvidge	Period drama	World Film
Land o' Lizards	Frank Borzage	Frank Borzage, Ann Little, Jack Richardson	Western	Mutual Film
Langdon's Legacy	Otis Turner	J. Warren Kerrigan, Bertram Grassby, Lois Wilson	Drama	Universal
The Lash	James Young	Marie Doro, Elliott Dexter	Drama	Paramount
The Last Act	Walter Edwards	Bessie Barriscale, Clara Williams	Drama	Triangle Film
The Last Man	William Wolbert	Corinne Griffith, Jack Mower, Otto Lederer	War	Vitagraph
The Law Decides	Marguerite Bertsch, William P. S. Earle	Dorothy Kelly, Harry T. Morey	Drama	Vitagraph
Lieutenant Danny, U.S.A.	Walter Edwards	William Desmond, Enid Markey	Adventure	Triangle Film
Less Than the Dust	John Emerson	Mary Pickford, David Powell, Mary Alden	Drama	Paramount
Let Katie Do It	Sidney Franklin	Jane Grey, Tully Marshall	Drama	Triangle Film
Life's Blind Alley	Tom Ricketts	Harold Lockwood, May Allison	Drama	Mutual Film
Life's Shadows	William Nigh	Irene Howley, Robert Elliott	Comedy drama	Metro
The Light at Dusk	Edgar Lewis	Orrin Johnson, Mary Carr	Drama	Lubin
The Light of Happiness	John H. Collins	Viola Dana, Edward Earle	Drama	Metro
The Light That Failed	Edward José	Robert Edeson, José Collins	Drama	Pathe Exchange
Lights of New York	Van Dyke Brooke	Leah Baird, Walter McGrail, Adele DeGarde	Drama	Vitagraph
Little Eve Edgarton	Robert Z. Leonard	Ella Hall, Doris Pawn	Drama	Universal
Little Lady Eileen	J. Searle Dawley	Marguerite Clark, Vernon Steele	Drama	Paramount
The Little Liar	Lloyd Ingraham	Mae Marsh, Robert Harron	Drama	Triangle Film
Little Mary Sunshine	Henry King	Marguerite Nichols, Andrew Arbuckle	Drama	Pathe Exchange
Little Meena's Romance	Paul Powell	Dorothy Gish, Owen Moore	Comedy drama	Triangle Film
Little Miss Happiness	John G. Adolfi	June Caprice, Zena Keefe	Drama	Fox Film
The Little School Ma'am	Chester Franklin, Sidney Franklin	Dorothy Gish, Elmer Clifton	Drama	Triangle Film
The Little Shepherd of Bargain Row	Fred E. Wright	Richard Travers, Sallie Fisher	Drama	Essanay
Lonesome Town	Thomas N. Heffron	Clarence Kolb, Eugenie Forde	Comedy	Mutual Film
The Lords of High Decision	Jack Harvey	Cyril Scott, Joseph W. Girard, William Welsh	Drama	Universal
The Lost Bridegroom	James Kirkwood Sr.	John Barrymore, Ida Darling, Katherine Corri Harris	Comedy	Paramount
Love and Hate	James Vincent	Bertha Kalich, Stuart Holmes	Drama	Fox Film
The Love Girl	Robert Z. Leonard	Ella Hall, Adele Farrington	Comedy	Universal
The Love Hermit	Jack Prescott	William Russell, Charlotte Burton	Drama	Mutual Film
The Love Mask	Frank Reicher	Cleo Ridgely, Wallace Reid, Earle Foxe	Drama	Paramount
Love Never Dies	William Worthington	Ruth Stonehouse, Franklyn Farnum	Drama	Universal
The Love Thief	Richard Stanton	Gretchen Hartman, Alan Hale	Drama	Fox Film
Love's Lariat	George Marshall	Harry Carey, Neal Hart	Western	Universal
Love's Pilgrimage to America	Lawrence Marston	Lulu Glaser, Thomas Keeswald	Drama	Universal
Lovely Mary	Edgar Jones	Mary Miles Minter, Russell Simpson	Drama	Metro
The Lure of Heart's Desire	Francis J. Grandon	Edmund Breese, Evelyn Brent	Drama	Metro

== M–N ==
Title	Director	Cast	Genre	Notes
Macbeth	John Emerson	Herbert Beerbohm Tree, Constance Collier, Wilfred Lucas	Drama	Triangle Film
Madame la Presidente	Frank Lloyd	Anna Held, Forrest Stanley, Herbert Standing	Comedy	Paramount
Madame X	George F. Marion	Dorothy Donnelly, John Bowers	Drama	Pathe Exchange
The Madcap	William C. Dowlan	Flora Parker DeHaven, Vera Doria	Comedy	Universal
The Mainspring	Jack Conway	Ben F. Wilson, Francelia Billington	Drama	Universal
The Making of Maddalena	Frank Lloyd	Edna Goodrich, Forrest Stanley	Drama	Paramount
Man and His Soul	John W. Noble	Francis X. Bushman, Beverly Bayne	Drama	Metro
The Man Behind the Curtain	Cortland Van Deusen	Lillian Walker, Templar Saxe	Drama	Vitagraph
The Man from Bitter Roots	Oscar Apfel	William Farnum, Slim Whitaker, Henry A. Barrows	Western	Fox Film
The Man from Nowhere	Henry Otto	King Baggot, Irene Hunt, Joseph W. Girard	Drama	Universal
The Man in the Sombrero	Tom Ricketts	Harold Lockwood, May Allison, William Stowell	Romantic drama	Mutual Film
The Man Inside	John G. Adolfi	Edwin Stevens, Justina Huff	Mystery	Universal
A Man of Sorrow	Oscar Apfel	William Farnum, Dorothy Bernard	Drama	Fox Film
The Man Who Stood Still	Frank Hall Crane	Lew Fields, Doris Kenyon	Drama	World Film
The Man Who Would Not Die	William Russell, Jack Prescott	Charlotte Burton, Harry Keenan	Drama	Mutual Film
The Manager of the B & A	J.P. McGowan	Helen Holmes, Leo D. Maloney	Drama	Mutual Film
Manhattan Madness	Allan Dwan	Douglas Fairbanks, Jewel Carmen, George Beranger	Comedy	Triangle Film
The Marble Heart	Kenean Buel	Violet Horner, Walter Miller	Drama	Fox Film
Maria Rosa	Cecil B. DeMille	Geraldine Farrar, Wallace Reid	Drama	Paramount
The Mark of Cain	Joseph De Grasse	Lon Chaney, Dorothy Phillips	Drama	Universal
The Market of Vain Desire	Reginald Barker	Henry B. Warner, Clara Williams	Drama	Triangle Film
The Marriage of Molly-O	Paul Powell	Mae Marsh, Kate Bruce, Robert Harron	Comedy	Triangle Film
Martha's Vindication	Sidney Franklin	Norma Talmadge, Seena Owen	Drama	Triangle Film
The Martyrdom of Philip Strong	Richard Ridgely	Mabel Trunnelle, Bigelow Cooper	Drama	Edison Company
The Masked Rider	Fred J. Balshofer	Harold Lockwood, May Allison, Clarissa Selwynne	Drama	Metro
The Matrimonial Martyr	Sherwood MacDonald	Ruth Roland, Andrew Arbuckle	Comedy	Pathe Exchange
McTeague	Barry O'Neil	Holbrook Blinn, Fania Marinoff	Drama	World Film
The Measure of a Man	Jack Conway	J. Warren Kerrigan, Louise Lovely	Drama	Universal
The Mediator	Otis Turner	George Walsh, Juanita Hansen	Western	Fox Film
Medicine Bend	J.P. McGowan	Helen Holmes, Paul Hurst	Western	Mutual Film
The Men She Married	Travers Vale	Gail Kane, Arthur Ashley, Montagu Love	Drama	World Film
Merely Mary Ann	John G. Adolfi	Vivian Martin, Niles Welch	Romance	Fox Film
A Message to Garcia	Richard Ridgley	Mabel Trunnelle, Charles Sutton	War	Edison Company
Mice and Men	J. Searle Dawley	Marguerite Clark, Marshall Neilan	Romance	Paramount
The Microscope Mystery	Paul Powell	Wilfred Lucas, Constance Talmadge, Winifred Westover	Mystery	Triangle Film
A Million a Minute	John W. Noble	Francis X. Bushman, Beverly Bayne	Drama	Metro
The Mischief Maker	John G. Adolfi	June Caprice, Harry Benham	Comedy	Fox Film
The Misleading Lady	Arthur Berthelet	Henry B. Walthall, Edna Mayo, Edward Arnold	Comedy	Essanay
Miss George Washington	J. Searle Dawley	Marguerite Clark, Niles Welch	Comedy	Paramount
Miss Jackie of the Navy	Harry A. Pollard	Margarita Fischer, Jack Mower	Comedy	Mutual Film
Miss Petticoats	Harley Knoles	Alice Brady, Arthur Ashley	Romance	World Film
The Missing Links	Lloyd Ingraham	Thomas Jefferson, Elmer Clifton, Robert Harron	Drama	Triangle Film
Mister 44	Henry Otto	Harold Lockwood, May Allison	Comedy	Metro
Mixed Blood	Charles Swickard	Claire McDowell, George Beranger	Western	Universal
A Modern Thelma	John G. Adolfi	Vivian Martin, William H. Tooker	Drama	Fox Film
Molly Make-Believe	J. Searle Dawley	Marguerite Clark, Mahlon Hamilton	Drama	Paramount
The Moment Before	Robert G. Vignola	Pauline Frederick, Thomas Holding	Drama	Paramount
The Moral Fabric	Raymond B. West	Howard Hickman, Edith Reeves	Drama	Triangle Film
The Morals of Hilda	Lloyd B. Carleton	Gretchen Lederer, Emory Johnson, Adele Farrington	Drama	Universal
Mr. Goode, Samaritan	Edward Dillon	DeWolf Hopper, Fay Tincher	Comedy	Triangle Film
Mrs. Dane's Danger	Wilfrid North	Lillian Walker, Donald Hall	Drama	Vitagraph
My Lady Incog	Sidney Olcott	Hazel Dawn, George Majeroni	Comedy	Paramount
My Lady's Slipper	Ralph Ince	Anita Stewart, Earle Williams	Romance	Vitagraph
Naked Hearts	Rupert Julian	Francelia Billington, Zoe Rae, Jack Holt	Drama	Universal
Nanette of the Wilds	Joseph Kaufman	Pauline Frederick, Willard Mack	Drama	Paramount
The Narrow Path	Francis J. Grandon	Violet Mersereau, William Welsh	Drama	Universal
Nearly a King	Frederick A. Thomson	John Barrymore, Katherine Corri Harris	Comedy	Paramount
The Ne'er-Do-Well	Colin Campbell	Wheeler Oakman, Kathlyn Williams	Adventure	Selig
The New South	Robert Thornby	Carlyle Blackwell, Ethel Clayton	Drama	World Film
New York	George Fitzmaurice	Florence Reed, Fania Marinoff	Comedy drama	Pathe Exchange
A Night Out	George D. Baker	May Robson, Flora Finch	Comedy	Vitagraph
The Ninety and Nine	Ralph Ince	Lucille Lee Stewart, William Courtenay	Drama	Vitagraph
The No-Good Guy	Walter Edwards	William Collier Sr., Enid Markey, Charles K. French	Comedy	Triangle Film
Not My Sister	Charles Giblyn	Bessie Barriscale, William Desmond	Drama	Triangle Film
Notorious Gallagher	William Nigh	William Nigh, Marguerite Snow, Robert Elliott	Drama	Metro

== O–P ==
Title	Director	Cast	Genre	Notes
The Old Folks at Home	Chester Withey	Herbert Beerbohm Tree, Elmer Clifton	Drama	Triangle Film
Oliver Twist	James Young	Marie Doro, Tully Marshall	Drama	Paramount
The Ordeal of Elizabeth	Wilfrid North	Lillian Walker, Denton Vane	Drama	Vitagraph
Other People's Money	William Parke	Gladys Hulette, Fraunie Fraunholz	Drama	Mutual Film
The Other Side of the Door	Tom Ricketts	Harold Lockwood, May Allison	Romantic drama	Mutual Film
Out of the Drifts	J. Searle Dawley	Marguerite Clark, Jack W. Johnston, Albert Gran	Romance	Paramount
A Parisian Romance	Frederick A. Thomson	H. Cooper Cliffe, Dion Titheradge	Drama	Fox Film
The Parson of Panamint	William Desmond Taylor	Dustin Farnum, Winifred Kingston	Western	Paramount
Pasquale	William Desmond Taylor	Helen Jerome Eddy, Jack Nelson	Comedy	Paramount
Passers By	Stanner E.V. Taylor	Mary Charleson, Charles Cherry, Kate Sergeantson	Drama	World
The Path of Happiness	Elaine S. Carrington	Violet Mersereau, Sidney Bracey	Drama	Universal
The Patriot	William S. Hart	William S. Hart, Charles K. French	Western	Triangle Film
Pawn of Fate	Maurice Tourneur	George Beban, Doris Kenyon	Drama	World Film
Pay Dirt	Henry King	Henry King, Marguerite Nichols	Drama	Edison Company
Paying the Price	Frank Hall Crane	Gail Kane, Gladden James, June Elvidge	Drama	World Film
The Payment	Raymond B. West	Bessie Barriscale, William Desmond	Drama	Triangle Film
The People vs. John Doe	Lois Weber	Evelyn Selbie, Maude George	Drama	Universal
The Pearl of Paradise	Harry A. Pollard	Margarita Fischer, Beatrice Van	Drama	Mutual Film
Peggy	Thomas H. Ince, Charles Giblyn	Billie Burke, William Desmond, Charles Ray	Comedy	Triangle Film
The Perils of Divorce	Edwin August	Edna Wallace Hopper, Frank Sheridan	Drama	World Film
The Phantom	Charles Giblyn	Frank Keenan, Enid Markey	Crime	Triangle Film
The Phantom Buccaneer	J. Charles Haydon	Richard Travers, Gertrude Glover	Drama	Essanay
Phantom Fortunes	Paul Scardon	James W. Morrison, Adele DeGarde	Drama	Vitagraph
Pidgin Island	Fred J. Balshofer	Harold Lockwood, May Allison	Romance	Metro
Pillars of Society	Raoul Walsh	Henry B. Walthall, Mary Alden	Drama	Triangle
The Pillory	Frederic Sullivan	Florence La Badie, Marie Shotwell	Drama	Pathe Exchange
The Place Beyond the Winds	Joseph De Grasse	Dorothy Phillips, Jack Mulhall, Lon Chaney	Drama	Universal
Plain Jane	Charles Miller	Bessie Barriscale, Charles Ray	Comedy	Triangle Film
Playing with Fire	Francis J. Grandon	Olga Petrova, Evelyn Brent	Drama	Metro
The Plow Girl	Robert Z. Leonard	Mae Murray, Elliott Dexter	Drama	Paramount
The Pool of Flame	Otis Turner	J. Warren Kerrigan, The Pool of Flame	Adventure	Universal
Poor Little Peppina	Sidney Olcott	Mary Pickford, Eugene O'Brien	Drama	Paramount
The Pretenders	George D. Baker	Emmy Wehlen, Charles Eldridge	Comedy drama	Metro
The Price of Fame	Charles Brabin	Marc McDermott, Naomi Childers	Drama	Vitagraph
The Price of Happiness	Edmund Lawrence	Mary Boland, Adolphe Menjou	Drama	World Film
The Price of Malice	O.A.C. Lund	Hamilton Revelle, Barbara Tennant	Drama	Metro
The Price of Silence	Joseph De Grasse	Dorothy Phillips, Lon Chaney	Drama	Universal
The Primal Lure	William S. Hart	William S. Hart, Margery Wilson, Robert McKim	Western	Triangle Film
The Prince Chap	Marshall Neilan	Mary Charleson, Bessie Eyton	Drama	Selig
A Prince in a Pawnshop	Paul Scardon	Barney Bernard, Bobby Connelly	Drama	Vitagraph
The Prince of Graustark	Fred E. Wright	Bryant Washburn, Marguerite Clayton	Drama	Essanay
Prudence the Pirate	William Parke	Gladys Hulette, Flora Finch	Comedy	Pathe Exchange
Public Opinion	Frank Reicher	Blanche Sweet, Earle Foxe	Drama	Paramount
Pudd'nhead Wilson	Frank Reicher	Theodore Roberts, Alan Hale, Thomas Meighan	Comedy	Paramount
Purity	Rae Berger	Audrey Munson, Nigel De Brulier, Eugenie Forde	Drama	Mutual Film
The Purple Lady	George A. Lessey	Alan Hale, Howard Truesdale	Comedy	Metro

== Q–R ==
Title	Director	Cast	Genre	Notes
The Quest of Life	Ashley Miller	Florence Walton, Julian L'Estrange	Drama	Paramount
The Race	George Melford	Victor Moore, Anita King	Drama	Paramount
The Ragamuffin	William C. deMille	Blanche Sweet, Tom Forman	Drama	Paramount
The Ragged Princess	John G. Adolfi	June Caprice, Richard Neill	Comedy drama	Fox Film
The Raiders	Charles Swickard	H.B. Warner, Dorothy Dalton	Drama	Triangle Film
The Rail Rider	Maurice Tourneur	House Peters, Zena Keefe	Drama	World Film
The Rainbow Princess	J. Searle Dawley	Ann Pennington, William Courtleigh, Augusta Anderson	Drama	Paramount
Ramona	Donald Crisp	Adda Gleason, Mabel Van Buren, Ann Dvorak	Drama	Independent
The Ransom	Edmund Lawrence	Julia Dean, Louise Huff	Drama	World Film
The Red Mouse	John W. Noble	Francis X. Bushman, Beverly Bayne	Mystery	Metro
Redeeming Love	William Desmond Taylor	Kathlyn Williams, Thomas Holding, Wyndham Standing	Drama	Paramount
The Redemption of Dave Darcey	Paul Scardon	James W. Morrison, Mary Maurice	Drama	Vitagraph
Reggie Mixes In	Christy Cabanne	Douglas Fairbanks, Bessie Love	Action comedy	Triangle Film
The Return of Draw Egan	William S. Hart	William S. Hart, Louise Glaum, Margery Wilson	Western	Triangle Film
The Return of Eve	Arthur Berthelet	Edna Mayo, Eugene O'Brien	Drama	Essanay
Revelations	Arthur Maude	Constance Crawley, Arthur Maude	Drama	Mutual Film
The Revolt	Barry O'Neil	Frances Nelson, Arthur Ashley	Drama	World Film
The Reward of Patience	Robert G. Vignola	Louise Huff, John Bowers, Lottie Pickford	Drama	Paramount
The Right Direction	E. Mason Hopper	Vivian Martin, Colin Chase, Herbert Standing	Comedy	Paramount
The Right to Be Happy	Rupert Julian	Claire McDowell, Emory Johnson, Francelia Billington	Drama	Universal
The Rise of Susan	Stanner E. V. Taylor	Clara Kimball Young, Warner Oland	Drama	World Film
The River of Romance	Henry Otto	Harold Lockwood, May Allison	Drama	Metro
The Road to Love	Scott Sidney	Lenore Ulric, Colin Chase, Lucille Ward	Drama	Paramount
Rolling Stones	Dell Henderson	Owen Moore, Marguerite Courtot, Alan Hale	Drama	Paramount
A Romance of Billy Goat Hill	Lynn Reynolds	Myrtle Gonzalez, Val Paul	Drama	Universal
The Romantic Journey	George Fitzmaurice	William Courtenay, Alice Dovey	Drama	Pathe Exchange
Romeo and Juliet	J. Gordon Edwards	Theda Bara, Walter Law	Romance	Fox Film
Romeo and Juliet	John W. Noble	Francis X. Bushman, Beverly Bayne	Romance	Metro
Rose of the Alley	Charles Horan	Mary Miles Minter, Thomas Carrigan	Drama	Metro
Rose of the South	Paul Scardon	Peggy Hyland, Antonio Moreno	Drama	Vitagraph
The Ruling Passion	James C. McKay	William E. Shay, Claire Whitney	Drama	Fox Film
The Rummy	Paul Powell	Wilfred Lucas, Pauline Starke	Drama	Triangle Film

== S–T ==
Title	Director	Cast	Genre	Notes
The Sable Blessing	George L. Sargent	Richard Bennett, Rhea Mitchell	Drama	Mutual Film
Saint, Devil and Woman	Frederic Richard Sullivan	Florence La Badie, Hector Dion	Drama	Pathe Exchange
Saints and Sinners	James Kirkwood Sr.	Clarence Handyside, Peggy Hyland	Drama	Paramount
The Salamander	Arthur Donaldson	Ruth Findlay, Iva Shepard, John St. Polis	Drama	Independent
The Saleslady	Frederick A. Thomson	Hazel Dawn, Irving Cummings	Drama	Paramount
Salvation Joan	Wilfrid North	Edna May, Harry T. Morey, Dorothy Kelly	Comedy	Vitagraph
Saving the Family Name	Lois Weber, Phillips Smalley	Mary MacLaren, Jack Holt	Drama	Universal
The Scarlet Oath	Frank Powell, Travers Vale	Gail Kane, Alan Hale, Montagu Love	Drama	World Film
The Scarlet Woman	Edmund Lawrence	Olga Petrova, Edward Martindel	Drama	Metro
Secret Love	Robert Z. Leonard	Jack Curtis, Helen Ware	Drama	Universal
The Secret of the Swamp	Lynn Reynolds	George Hernandez, Myrtle Gonzalez	Drama	Paramount
The Seekers	Otis Turner	Flora Parker DeHaven, Edward Hearn	Drama	Universal
The Selfish Woman	E. Mason Hopper	Wallace Reid, Cleo Ridgely, Edythe Chapman	Drama	Paramount
The Serpent	Raoul Walsh	Theda Bara, James A. Marcus	Drama	Fox Film
Seventeen	Robert G. Vignola	Louise Huff, Jack Pickford	Comedy	Paramount
The Sex Lure	Ivan Abramson	James W. Morrison, Louise Vale	Drama	Independent
The Shadow of a Doubt	Wray Bartlett Physioc	Carlyle Blackwell, George Anderson	Crime	World Film
Shadows and Sunshine	Henry King	Marie Osborne, Lucy Payton	Drama	Pathe Exchange
Shell 43	Reginald Barker	H.B. Warner, Enid Markey, John Gilbert	War	Triangle Film
Sherlock Holmes	Arthur Berthelet	William Gillette, Ernest Maupain	Mystery	Essanay
The Shine Girl	William Parke	Gladys Hulette, Kathryn Adams	Drama	Pathe Exchange
Shoes	Lois Weber	Mary MacLaren, William V. Mong	Drama	Universal
The Shop Girl	George D. Baker	Edith Storey, Antonio Moreno	Drama	Vitagraph
The Silent Battle	Jack Conway	J. Warren Kerrigan, Lois Wilson, Maude George	Drama	Universal
The Sign of the Poppy	Charles Swickard	Hobart Henley, Gertrude Selby	Drama	Universal
Silas Marner	Ernest C. Warde	Frederick Warde, Valda Valkyrien, Morgan Jones	Drama	Mutual
Silks and Satins	J. Searle Dawley	Marguerite Clark, Vernon Steele	Romance	Paramount
The Sin Ye Do	Walter Edwards	Frank Keenan, Margery Wilson	Drama	Triangle Film
Sins of Her Parent	Frank Lloyd	Gladys Brockwell, William Clifford	Drama	Fox Film
Sins of Men	James Vincent	Stuart Holmes, Dorothy Bernard	Comedy drama	Fox Film
A Sister of Six	Sidney Franklin, Chester Franklin	Bessie Love, Ralph Lewis	Western	Triangle Film
Slander	Will S. Davis	Bertha Kalich, Mayme Kelso	Drama	Fox Film
The Smugglers	Sidney Olcott	Donald Brian, Alma Tell	Comedy	Paramount
The Snowbird	Edwin Carewe	Mabel Taliaferro, James Cruze	Drama	Metro
Snow White	J. Searle Dawley	Marguerite Clark, Creighton Hale	Fantasy	Paramount
The Social Buccaneer	Jack Conway	J. Warren Kerrigan, Louise Lovely, Maude George	Drama	Universal
The Social Highwayman	Edwin August	John St. Polis, Ormi Hawley	Drama	World Film
The Social Pirates	James W. Horne	Marin Sais, True Boardman	Adventure	Kalem Company
The Social Secretary	John Emerson	Norma Talmadge, Erich von Stroheim	Comedy	Triangle Film
Sold for Marriage	Christy Cabanne	Lillian Gish, Walter Long	Drama	Triangle Film
Somewhere in France	Charles Giblyn	Louise Glaum, Howard C. Hickman, Jerome Storm	War	Triangle Film
A Son of Erin	Julia Crawford Ivers	Dustin Farnum, Winifred Kingston	Comedy drama	Paramount
A Son of the Immortals	Otis Turner	J. Warren Kerrigan, Bertram Grassby, Lois Wilson	Drama	Universal
The Sorrows of Love	Charles Giblyn	Bessie Barriscale, Ora Carew, William Desmond	Drama	Triangle Film
A Soul Enslaved	Cleo Madison	Cleo Madison, Tom Chatterton, Lule Warrenton	Drama	Universal
The Soul of Kura San	Edward LeSaint	Sessue Hayakawa, Myrtle Stedman, Tsuru Aoki	Drama	Paramount
The Soul Market	Francis J. Grandon	Olga Petrova, Fraunie Fraunholz, Evelyn Brent	Drama	Metro
The Soul's Cycle	Ulysses Davis	Patricia Palmer	Drama	Mutual Film
Souls in Bondage	Edgar Lewis	Nance O'Neil, Mary Carr	Drama	Lubin
The Sowers	William C. deMille	Blanche Sweet, Thomas Meighan	Drama	Paramount
The Spell of the Yukon	Burton L. King	Edmund Breese, Christine Mayo, Evelyn Brent	Drama	Metro
The Sphinx	John G. Adolfi	Herbert Kelcey, Effie Shannon, Louise Huff	Drama	Universal
The Spider	Robert G. Vignola	Pauline Frederick, Thomas Holding	Drama	Paramount
The Spider and the Fly	J. Gordon Edwards	Stuart Holmes, Claire Whitney	Drama	Fox Film
Sporting Blood	Bertram Bracken	Dorothy Bernard, DeWitt Jennings	Drama	Fox Film
The Stepping Stone	Reginald Barker, Thomas H. Ince	Frank Keenan, Mary Boland	Drama	Triangle Film
The Sting of Victory	J. Charles Haydon	Henry B. Walthall, Thomas Commerford	Drama	Essanay
The Stolen Triumph	David H. Thompson	Clara Blandick, Edgar Kennedy	Drama	Metro
The Storm	Frank Reicher	Blanche Sweet, Thomas Meighan	Drama	Paramount
The Straight Way	Will S. Davis	Valeska Suratt, Herbert Heyes, Claire Whitney	Drama	Fox Film
Stranded	Lloyd Ingraham	DeWolf Hopper, Carl Stockdale	Drama	Triangle Film
A Stranger from Somewhere	William Worthington	Franklyn Farnum, Agnes Vernon	Comedy	Universal
The Strength of Donald McKenzie	William Russell	William Russell, Jack Prescott	Drama	Mutual Film
The Strength of the Weak	Lucius Henderson	Mary Fuller, Harry Hilliard	Drama	Universal
The Stronger Love	Frank Lloyd	Vivian Martin, Herbert Standing	Drama	Paramount
The Struggle	John Ince	Arthur Ashley, Frank Sheridan, Ethel Grey Terry	Adventure	World Film
Sudden Riches	Emile Chautard	Robert Warwick, Gerda Holmes	Drama	World Film
The Sultana	Sherwood MacDonald	Ruth Roland, William Conklin	Crime	Pathe Exchange
The Summer Girl	Edwin August	Mollie King, Arthur Ashley	Comedy	World Film
The Sunbeam	Edwin Carewe	Mabel Taliaferro, Raymond McKee	Drama	Metro
Sunshine Dad	Edward Dillon	DeWolf Hopper, Fay Tincher, Eugene Pallette	Comedy	Triangle Film
The Supreme Sacrifice	Lionel Belmore, Harley Knoles	Robert Warwick, Vernon Steele, Anna Q. Nilsson	Drama	World Film
The Supreme Temptation	Harry Davenport	Antonio Moreno, Charles Kent	Drama	Vitagraph
The Surprises of an Empty Hotel	Theodore Marston	Charles Richman, Arline Pretty	Drama	Vitagraph
Susan Rocks the Boat	Paul Powell	Dorothy Gish, Owen Moore	Drama	Triangle Film
Susie Snowflake	James Kirkwood Sr.	Ann Pennington, William Courtleigh	Comedy	Paramount
The Suspect	S. Rankin Drew	Anita Stewart, Anders Randolf	Drama	Vitagraph
Sweet Kitty Bellairs	James Young	Mae Murray, Tom Forman, Belle Bennett	Historical comedy	Paramount
Tangled Fates	Travers Vale	Alice Brady, Arthur Ashley	Drama	World Film
Tangled Hearts	Joseph De Grasse	Lon Chaney, Louise Lovely	Drama	Universal
The Tarantula	George D. Baker	Edith Storey, Antonio Moreno	Drama	Vitagraph
The Target	Norval MacGregor	Hobart Bosworth, Anna Lehr	Western	Universal
Temptation and the Man	Robert F. Hill	Sidney Bracey, Hobart Henley	Crime	Universal
Tennessee's Pardner	George Melford	Fannie Ward, Raymond Hatton	Western	Paramount
The Test	George Fitzmaurice	Lumsden Hare, Carl Harbaugh	Drama	Pathe Exchange
That Sort	Charles Brabin	Ernest Maupain, Duncan McRae	Drama	Essanay
Then I'll Come Back to You	George Irving	Alice Brady, Jack Sherrill	Drama	World Film
The Thoroughbred	Charles Bartlett	Charlotte Burton, Jack Prescott	Drama	Triangle Film
The Thousand-Dollar Husband	James Young	Blanche Sweet, Theodore Roberts, Tom Forman	Drama	Paramount
Thou Art the Man	S. Rankin Drew	Virginia Pearson, Joseph Kilgour	Drama	Vitagraph
Thou Shalt Not Covet	Colin Campbell	Tyrone Power Sr., Kathlyn Williams	Drama	Selig
The Three Godfathers	Edward LeSaint	Harry Carey, Jack Hoxie, Stella LeSaint	Western	Universal
The Three Musketeers	Charles Swickard	Orrin Johnson, Dorothy Dalton, Louise Glaum	Adventure	Triangle Film
Through the Wall	Rollin S. Sturgeon	George Holt, Corinne Griffith, Otto Lederer	Drama	Vitagraph
Thrown to the Lions	Lucius Henderson	Mary Fuller, Joseph W. Girard, Augustus Phillips	Drama	Universal
To Have and to Hold	George Melford	Mae Murray, Wallace Reid	Adventure	Paramount
The Toilers	Edgar Lewis	Nance O'Neil, Victor Sutherland	Drama	Lubin
The Tongues of Men	Frank Lloyd	Constance Collier, Forrest Stanley	Drama	Paramount
The Torch Bearer	William Russell	Charlotte Burton, Harry Keenan	Drama	Mutual Film
The Tortured Heart	Will S. Davis	Virginia Pearson, Stuart Holmes	Drama	Fox Film
The Traffic Cop	Howard M. Mitchell	Gladys Hulette, Theodore von Eltz	Drama	Mutual Film
The Trail of the Lonesome Pine	Cecil B. DeMille	Charlotte Walker, Thomas Meighan	Drama	Paramount
The Traveling Salesman	Joseph Kaufman	Doris Kenyon, Harry Northrup	Comedy	Paramount
The Truant Soul	Harry Beaumont	Henry B. Walthall, Mary Charleson	Drama	Essanay
True Nobility	Donald MacDonald	Helene Rosson, Forrest Taylor	Drama	Mutual Film
The Turmoil	Edgar Jones	Valli Valli, George LeGuere	Drama	Metro
The Twinkler	Edward Sloman	William Russell, Charlotte Burton	Crime	Mutual Film
The Twin Triangle	Harry Harvey	Jackie Saunders, Mollie McConnell	Drama	World Film
The Two Edged Sword	George D. Baker	Edith Storey, Josephine Earle	Drama	Vitagraph
Two Men of Sandy Bar	Lloyd B. Carleton	Hobart Bosworth, Emory Johnson, Gretchen Lederer	Western	Universal

== U–V ==
Title	Director	Cast	Genre	Notes
The Unattainable	Lloyd B. Carleton	Dorothy Davenport, Emory Johnson	Drama	Universal
Under Cover	Robert G. Vignola	Hazel Dawn, Owen Moore	Drama	Paramount
Under Two Flags	J. Gordon Edwards	Theda Bara, Herbert Heyes	Drama	Fox Film
The Undertow	Frank Thorne	Franklin Ritchie, Helene Rosson	Drama	Mutual Film
Undine	Henry Otto	Ida Schnall, Douglas Gerrard	Drama	Universal
The Unpardonable Sin	Barry O'Neil	Holbrook Blinn, Lila Chester	Drama	World Film
Unprotected	James Young	Blanche Sweet, Theodore Roberts, Ernest Joy	Drama	Paramount
Unto Those Who Sin	William Robert Daly	Fritzi Brunette, Lillian Hayward	Drama	Selig
The Unwelcome Mother	James Vincent	Valda Valkyrien, Walter Law	Drama	Fox Film
The Upheaval	Charles Horan	Lionel Barrymore, Howard Truesdale	Drama	Metro
The Upstart	Edwin Carewe	George LeGuere, Marguerite Snow	Comedy	Metro
The Vagabond Prince	Charles Giblyn	H.B. Warner, Dorothy Dalton	Drama	Triangle Film
The Valiants of Virginia	Thomas N. Heffron	Kathlyn Williams, Edward Peil Sr.	Drama	Selig
The Valley of Decision	Rae Berger	Richard Bennett, George Periolat	Drama	Mutual Film
Vanity	John B. O'Brien	Emmy Wehlen, Edward Martindel	Drama	Metro
The Velvet Paw	Maurice Tourneur	House Peters, Gail Kane, Ned Burton	Drama	World Film
The Victim	Will S. Davis	Valeska Suratt, Herbert Heyes, Claire Whitney	Drama	Fox Film
The Victoria Cross	Edward LeSaint	Lou Tellegen, Cleo Ridgely, Sessue Hayakawa	Drama	Paramount
The Victory of Conscience	Frank Reicher, George Melford	Cleo Ridgely, Lou Tellegen	Drama	Paramount
The Vital Question	S. Rankin Drew	Virginia Pearson, Charles Kent	Drama	Vitagraph
The Vixen	J. Gordon Edwards	Theda Bara, Herbert Heyes	Drama	Fox Film
Vultures of Society	Arthur Berthelet	Lillian Drew, Marguerite Clayton	Drama	Essanay

== W–Z ==
Title	Director	Cast	Genre	Notes
The Wager	George D. Baker	Emily Stevens, Frank Currier	Crime	Metro
The Waifs	Scott Sidney	William Desmond, Carol Holloway	Drama	Triangle Film
The Wall Between	John W. Noble	Francis X. Bushman, Beverly Bayne	Drama	Metro
A Wall Street Tragedy	Lawrence Marston	Nat C. Goodwin, Richard Neill	Drama	Mutual Film
Wanted: A Home	Phillips Smalley, Lois Weber	Mary MacLaren, Jack Mulhall	Drama	Universal
War Brides	Herbert Brenon	Alla Nazimova, Charles Bryant, Richard Barthelmess	War drama	Selznick
The War Bride's Secret	Kenean Buel	Virginia Pearson, Walter Law	Drama	Fox Film
The Way of the World	Lloyd B. Carleton	Hobart Bosworth, Dorothy Davenport, Emory Johnson	Drama	Universal
The Weakness of Man	Barry O'Neil	Holbrook Blinn, Johnny Hines	Drama	World Film
The Weakness of Strength	Harry Revier	Edmund Breese, Ormi Hawley, Evelyn Brent	Drama	Metro
The Wharf Rat	Chester Withey	Mae Marsh, Spottiswoode Aitken, Pauline Starke	Comedy	Triangle
What Happened at 22	George Irving	Arthur Ashley, Frances Nelson	Drama	World Film
What Love Can Do	Jay Hunt	Adele Farrington, Kingsley Benedict	Drama	Universal
What Will People Say?	Alice Guy	Olga Petrova, Fraunie Fraunholz	Drama	Metro
The Wheel of the Law	George D. Baker	Emily Stevens, Raymond McKee	Drama	Metro
Where Are My Children?	Phillips Smalley	Tyrone Power Sr., Juan de la Cruz	Crime drama	Universal
Where Love Leads	Frank Griffin	Ormi Hawley, Rockliffe Fellowes	Drama	Fox Film
The Whirlpool of Destiny	Otis Turner	Jack Mulhall, Flora Parker DeHaven	Drama	Universal
Whispering Smith	J.P. McGowan	Helen Holmes, J.P. McGowan	Western	Mutual Film
The White Rosette	Donald MacDonald	Eugenie Forde, Richard La Reno	Drama	Mutual Film
Who Killed Simon Baird?	James Durkin	Edna Wallace Hopper, Muriel Ostriche	Mystery	World Film
Whom the Gods Destroy	J. Stuart Blackton, Herbert Brenon	Alice Joyce, Harry T. Morey, Marc McDermott	Drama	Vitagraph
A Wife's Sacrifice	J. Gordon Edwards	Robert B. Mantell, Genevieve Blinn, Claire Whitney	Drama	Fox Film
A Wild Girl of the Sierras	Paul Powell	Mae Marsh, Wilfred Lucas	Drama	Triangle Film
The Witch	Frank Powell	Nance O'Neil, Alfred Hickman	Drama	Fox Film
Witchcraft	Frank Reicher	Fannie Ward, Lillian Leighton	Drama	Paramount
The Witching Hour	George Irving	C. Aubrey Smith, Marie Shotwell	Drama	Independent
The Wolf Woman	Raymond B. West	Louise Glaum, Howard C. Hickman, Charles Ray	Drama	Triangle Film
The Woman in 47	George Irving	Alice Brady, Jack Sherrill	Drama	World Film
The Woman in the Case	Hugh Ford	Pauline Frederick, Alan Hale	Drama	Paramount
A Woman's Daring	Edward Sloman	Winifred Greenwood, Edward Coxen	Drama	Mutual Film
A Woman's Honor	Roland West	Arthur Donaldson, Ruby Hoffman	Drama	Fox Film
The Woman's Law	Lawrence B. McGill	Florence Reed, Duncan McRae	Drama	Pathe Exchange
A Woman's Way	Barry O'Neil	Ethel Clayton, Carlyle Blackwell	Drama	World Film
The Wood Nymph	Paul Powell	Marie Doro, Frank Campeau	Drama	Triangle Film
The World Against Him	Frank Hall Crane	June Elvidge, John St. Polis	Drama	World Film
The World and the Woman	Frank Lloyd	Jeanne Eagels, Boyd Marshall	Drama	Pathe Exchange
The World's Great Snare	Joseph Kaufman	Pauline Frederick, Irving Cummings	Drama	Paramount
The Writing on the Wall	Tefft Johnson	Joseph Kilgour, Virginia Pearson, Naomi Childers	Drama	Vitagraph
The Wrong Door	Carter DeHaven	Carter DeHaven, Flora Parker DeHaven	Comedy	Universal
The Yaqui	Lloyd B. Carleton	Hobart Bosworth, Goldie Colwell	Western	Universal
The Years of the Locust	George Melford	Fannie Ward, Walter Long	Drama	Paramount
The Yellow Passport	Edwin August	Clara Kimball Young, John St. Polis	Drama	World Film
The Yellow Pawn	George Melford	Wallace Reid, Cleo Ridgely	Drama	Paramount
A Yoke of Gold	Lloyd B. Carleton	Emory Johnson, Dorothy Davenport	Drama	Universal
A Youth of Fortune	Otis Turner	Carter DeHaven, Flora Parker DeHaven	Comedy	Universal
Youth's Endearing Charm	William C. Dowlan	Mary Miles Minter, Wallace MacDonald	Drama	Mutual Film

== Short films ==
Title	Director	Cast	Genre	Notes
A La Cabaret	Walter Wright	Ora Carew, Joseph Belmont, Blanche Payson	Comedy	
Arthur's Desperate Resolve	William Garwood	William Garwood, Lois Wilson	Comedy	
Behind the Screen	Charlie Chaplin	Charlie Chaplin, Edna Purviance, Eric Campbell	Comedy	
Billy's War Brides	William Garwood	William Garwood, Sonia Marcelle, Molly Gilmore	Comedy	
The Broken Cross	Tom Ricketts	Harold Lockwood, May Allison	Romance	
The Count	Charlie Chaplin	Charlie Chaplin, Edna Purviance, Eric Campbell	Comedy	
The Curse of Quon Gwon	Marion Wong		Drama	
The Decoy	William Garwood	William Garwood, Edward Brady, Lois Wilson	Drama	
The Fatal Glass of Beer	Tod Browning	Elmo Lincoln, Tully Marshall	Comedy	
The Fate of the Dolphin	Tom Ricketts	Perry Banks, Edward Coxen	Drama	
Fatty and Mabel Adrift	Roscoe "Fatty" Arbuckle	Roscoe "Fatty" Arbuckle, Mabel Normand	Short comedy	
Felix on the Job	George Felix	Lon Chaney	Comedy	
The Fireman	Charlie Chaplin	Charlie Chaplin, Edna Purviance, Lloyd Bacon	Short comedy	
The Floorwalker	Charlie Chaplin	Charlie Chaplin, Edna Purviance, Eric Campbell, Lloyd Bacon	Short comedy	Chaplin's first film for Mutual Films
The Gamble	Tom Ricketts	Harold Lockwood, May Allison	Drama	
The Gentle Art of Burglary	Raymond L. Schrock	William Garwood, Violet Mersereau	Comedy	
The Grey Sisterhood	Edward LeSaint	William Garwood, Stella LeSaint, Ogden Crane	Mystery	
He Wrote a Book	William Garwood	William Garwood, Edward Brady	Comedy	
His Picture	William Garwood	William Garwood, Violet Mersereau, Clara Beyers	Comedy	
The League of the Future	Edward LeSaint	William Garwood		
Lillo of the Sulu Seas	Tom Ricketts	Harold Lockwood, May Allison	Romance	
Lonesome Luke Leans to the Literary	Hal Roach	Harold Lloyd, Bebe Daniels	Short comedy	
Lonesome Luke Lolls in Luxury	Hal Roach	Harold Lloyd, Bebe Daniels	Short comedy	
Lonesome Luke, Circus King	Hal Roach	Harold Lloyd, Bebe Daniels	Short comedy	
Luke and the Bang-Tails	Hal Roach	Harold Lloyd	Short comedy	
Luke and the Bomb Throwers	Hal Roach	Harold Lloyd	Short comedy	
Luke and the Mermaids	Hal Roach	Harold Lloyd	Short comedy	
Luke and the Rural Roughnecks	Hal Roach	Harold Lloyd	Short comedy	
Luke Does the Midway	Hal Roach	Harold Lloyd	Short comedy	
Luke Foils the Villain	Hal Roach	Harold Lloyd	Short comedy	
Luke Joins the Navy	Hal Roach	Harold Lloyd	Short comedy	
Luke Laughs Last	Hal Roach	Harold Lloyd	Short comedy	
Luke Locates the Loot	Hal Roach	Harold Lloyd	Short comedy	
Luke Lugs Luggage	Hal Roach	Harold Lloyd	Short comedy	
Luke Pipes the Pippins	Hal Roach	Harold Lloyd	Short comedy	
Luke Rides Roughshod	Hal Roach	Harold Lloyd	Short comedy	
Luke, Crystal Gazer	Hal Roach	Harold Lloyd	Short comedy	
Luke, Patient Provider	Hal Roach	Harold Lloyd	Short comedy	
Luke, Rank Impersonator	Hal Roach	Harold Lloyd	Short comedy	
Luke, the Candy Cut-Up	Hal Roach	Harold Lloyd	Short comedy	
Luke, the Chauffeur	Hal Roach	Harold Lloyd	Short comedy	
Luke, the Gladiator	Hal Roach	Harold Lloyd	Short comedy	
Luke's Double	Hal Roach	Harold Lloyd	Short comedy	
Luke's Fatal Flivver	Hal Roach	Harold Lloyd	Short comedy	
Luke's Fireworks Fizzle	Hal Roach	Harold Lloyd	Short comedy	
Luke's Late Lunchers	Hal Roach	Harold Lloyd	Short comedy	
Luke's Lost Lamb	Hal Roach	Harold Lloyd	Short comedy	
Luke's Movie Muddle	Hal Roach	Harold Lloyd	Short comedy	
Luke's Newsie Knockout	Hal Roach	Harold Lloyd	Short comedy	
Luke's Preparedness Preparations	Hal Roach	Harold Lloyd	Short comedy	
Luke's Shattered Sleep	Hal Roach	Harold Lloyd	Short comedy	
Luke's Society Mixup	Hal Roach	Harold Lloyd	Short comedy	
Luke's Speedy Club Life	Hal Roach	Harold Lloyd	Short comedy	
Luke's Washful Waiting	Hal Roach	Harold Lloyd	Short comedy	
Matching Dreams	B. Reeves Eason	Sylvia Ashton, Vivian Rich	Short comedy	
The Moonshiners	Roscoe "Fatty" Arbuckle	Joe Bordeaux, J. Herbert Frank	Short comedy	
The Mystery of the Leaping Fish	John Emerson, Christy Cabanne	Douglas Fairbanks, Bessie Love, Alma Rubens	Short comedy	
One A.M.	Charlie Chaplin	Charlie Chaplin	Short comedy	
The Pawnshop	Charlie Chaplin	Charlie Chaplin, Edna Purviance, Henry Bergman	Short comedy	
Police	Charlie Chaplin	Charlie Chaplin, Edna Purviance, Wesley Ruggles	Short comedy	
The Release of Dan Forbes	Donald MacDonald	Helene Rosson, William Stowell, Harry von Meter	Drama	
The Rink	Charlie Chaplin	Charlie Chaplin, Edna Purviance	Short comedy	
A Sanitarium Scramble	B. Reeves Eason	Sylvia Ashton	Comedy	
The Secret Wire	Thomas Ricketts	Harold Lockwood, May Allison	Romance	
Shadows	B. Reeves Eason	Frank Mayo		
The Smugglers of Santa Cruz	Donald MacDonald	Charlotte Burton	Drama	
A Society Sherlock	William Garwood	William Garwood, Irma Dawkins	Comedy	
A Soul at Stake	William Garwood	Andrew Arbuckle, Lois Wilson	Drama	
Stampede in the Night	Jacques Jaccard	Hoot Gibson, Olive Carey	Western	
Them Was the Happy Days!	Hal Roach	Harold Lloyd, Bebe Daniels	Comedy	
Three Fingered Jenny	Edward LeSaint	William Garwood, Stella LeSaint, Carmen Phillips	Mystery	
Time and Tide	B. Reeves Eason	Hugh Bennett	Drama	
Two Seats at the Opera	William Garwood	William J. Welsh	Comedy	
The Vagabond	Charles Chaplin	Charles Chaplin, Edna Purviance	Comedy	
Viviana	B. Reeves Eason	Sylvia Ashton	Drama	

== See also ==
- 1916 in the United States
