= Ray "Red" Thompson =

American stuntman and actor

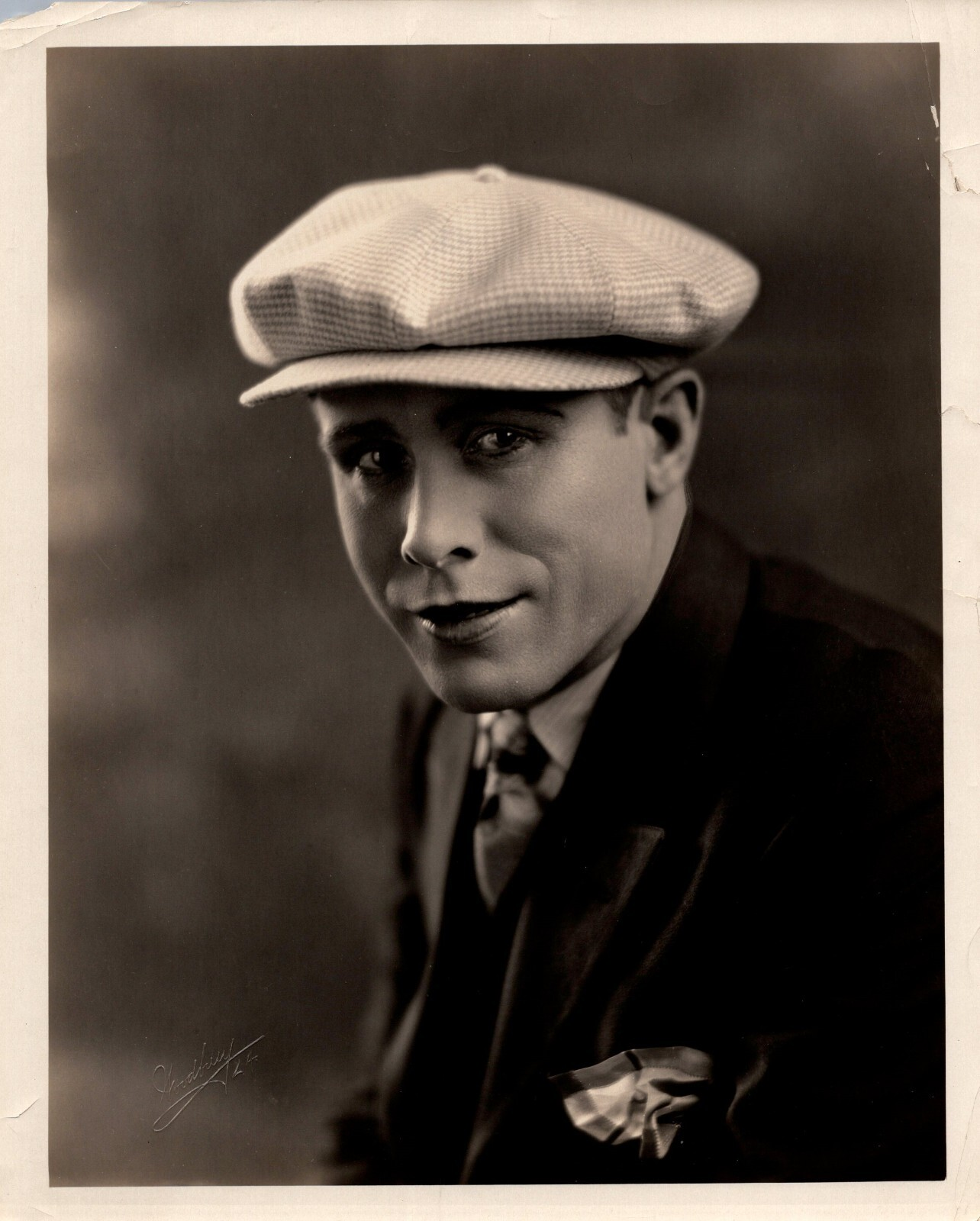
- Born: Raymond E. Thompson; July 15, 1889; Gettysburg, Pennsylvania, U.S.
- Died: June 29, 1927 (aged 37); Copper River, Alaska, U.S.
- Cause of death: Drowning during stunt filming
- Other name: Red Thompson
- Occupations: Stuntman, actor
- Years active: 1916–1927
- Spouse: Harrietta Emma Meloche (m. 1920)

Raymond "Red" Thompson (July 15, 1889 – June 29, 1927) was an American stuntman and character actor of the silent film era. Known for his daring horseback and aquatic stunts, he appeared in dozens of short films and westerns, often uncredited. He died during a stunt sequence for the film The Trail of '98 (1928), becoming one of the early casualties of stunt performance in Hollywood.

== Early life ==
Ray Thompson joined the circus as a young man, performing hippodrome races and stunt riding, and later worked with the 101 Ranch Show. He was also among the first to participate in mounted pushball exhibitions.

== Career ==
Thompson began working in silent comedies and westerns around 1916. He appeared in multiple short films with Harold Lloyd during the "Lonesome Luke" period. In 1920, he played the role of Malbihn in The Son of Tarzan, a successful serial based on the novel by Edgar Rice Burroughs. Over the next decade, he took on small roles in feature films, often portraying henchmen, foremen, or background characters, while also performing dangerous stunts.

He doubled for several major stars, including John Barrymore, and became known as one of the most fearless stuntmen of the 1920s. Among his most notable feats were

- Being tied and thrown from a train in motion in The Toll Gate (1920)
- Performing horse rolls down cliffs and into rivers
- Leaping from boats onto whales in films like All the Brothers Were Valiant (1923) and The Sea Beast (1926)
- Doubling for Barbara La Marr in a burning set escape in The Shooting of Dan McGrew (1924)

Despite being able to do all kind of stunts, his specialty was the high horse jump from a cliff to water .

== Death ==
Thompson died on June 29, 1927, while filming a stunt sequence for Clarence Brown's The Trail of '98 on the Copper River in Alaska. During a scene involving boats navigating rapids, his craft capsized. Thompson drowned, and two other men—Joseph Bautin and F.H. Daughters—also died while attempting rescues. His body was never recovered.

A coroner's jury in Alaska ruled that the production company was negligent.

== Personal life ==
He married Harrietta Emma Meloche (or Malosh) on June 30, 1920, in Los Angeles. The couple had no children. Harrietta later remarried.

== Legacy ==
Thompson's story was featured in the 1980 television documentary Hollywood, in the episode "Hazard of the Game," which paid tribute to the overlooked contributions and dangers faced by early film stunt performers.

== Selected filmography ==
=== Short films ===
- 1916: Luke Locates the Loot
- 1916: Luke Rides Roughshod
- 1916: Luke and the Rural Roughnecks
- 1916: Luke's Shattered Sleep
- 1916: Luke, Patient Provider
- 1916: Luke's Speedy Club Life
- 1916: Luke and the Mermaids
- 1916: Luke and the Bang-Tails
- 1917: Luke's Lost Liberty
- 1917: Luke's Busy Day
- 1917: Lonesome Luke Loses Patients
- 1917: Luke's Trolley Troubles
- 1917: Luke's Preparedness Preparations
- 1917: Luke, the Chauffeur
- 1927: Should Sleepwalkers Marry?

=== Feature films ===
- 1920: The Son of Tarzan – as Malbihn
- 1920: The Toll Gate
- 1923: All the Brothers Were Valiant
- 1924: The Shooting of Dan McGrew
- 1924: When a Man’s a Man – as Curley Elson
- 1925: Go West – as Foreman
- 1926: The Sea Beast – stunt double for John Barrymore
- 1926: The Enchanted Hill – as Tommy Scaife
- 1926: The Fighting Buckaroo – as Second Crook
- 1928: The Trail of '98 – final role (uncredited; died during production)
