= Wife and Auto Trouble =

- Directed by: Dell Henderson; Mack Sennett
- Written by: Roy Del Ruth (scenario)
- Produced by: Mack Sennett
- Starring: William Collier Sr. Blanche Payson; Joseph Belmont; Alice Davenport; Mae Busch
- Production company: Keystone Studios
- Distributed by: Triangle Film Corporation
- Release date: March 5, 1916
- Running time: 14 minutes
- Country: United States
- Language: Silent (English intertitles)

Wife and Auto Trouble is a 1916 American silent comedy film short directed by Dell Henderson and Mack Sennett. It was made by the "Tri-Stone Film Company", an evolution of "Keystone Triangle" which in turn evolved from the famous Keystone Film Company.

== Plot ==
A new husband shares a house with his wife and mother-in-law and a second man (listed as a brother-in-law). The first scene shows favoritism at the breakfast table to the second man, but whilst he reads his paper the table is rotated to ensure a good cup of coffee for the husband.

At work the husband chats up his secretary Mae Busch and is discovered by the second male who calls his mother-in-law. A car bought for the secretary is given to the wife as a gift to stall her, but the secretary demands it back. Action moves to a private booth in a restaurant/dance hall where a similar evasion act ensues.

A car chase ensues followed by the "Tri-Stone Kops", an evolution from the earlier Keystone Kops.

== Cast ==
- William Collier Sr. as A meek husband
- Blanche Payson as His wife
- Joseph Belmont as His Brother-In-Law
- Alice Davenport as His Mother-In-Law
- Mae Busch as A speedy stenographer
- Wayland Trask as Waiter
- Eddie Cline as Driver
- Hugh Fay as Hayseed Character in Store
- Tri-Stone Kops: Jimmy Bryant, Joseph Callahan, Billy Gilbert, Al Kaufman

== Preservation ==
A 16 mm copy of the film is held by George Eastman House.

== See also ==
- List of American films of 1916
