= Mary's Ankle =

1920 film by Lloyd Ingraham

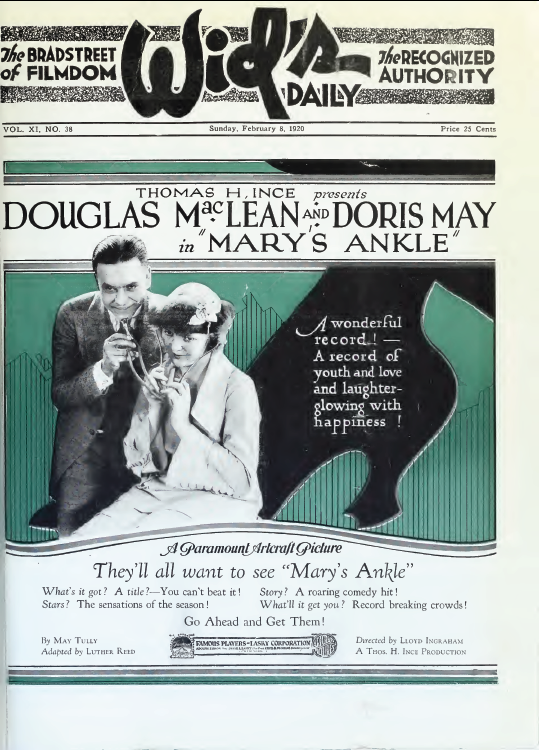
- Advertisement for film
- Directed by: Lloyd Ingraham
- Screenplay by: Luther Reed
- Based on: Mary's Ankle by May Tully
- Produced by: Thomas H. Ince
- Starring: Douglas MacLean; Doris May; Victor Potel; Neal Burns; James Gordon; Lizette Thorne
- Cinematography: Bert Cann
- Edited by: Harry L. Decker
- Production companies: Thomas H. Ince Corporation; Artcraft Pictures Corporation; Famous Players–Lasky Corporation
- Distributed by: Paramount Pictures
- Release date: February 15, 1920
- Running time: 50 minutes
- Country: United States
- Language: Silent (English intertitles)

Mary's Ankle is a 1920 American silent comedy film directed by Lloyd Ingraham and written by Luther Reed based upon the play of the same name by May Tully. The film stars Douglas MacLean, Doris May, Victor Potel, Neal Burns, James Gordon, and Lizette Thorne. The film was released on February 29, 1920, by Paramount Pictures.

== Plot ==
As described in a film magazine, Dr. Arthur P. Hampton, a struggling young physician, announces his marriage to a fictitious "Mary Jane Smith" in an effort to get his wealthy uncle George P. Hampton to give him and his two friends, a lawyer and a broker, sufficient funds to get them out of financial difficulties. He then finds himself in a difficult position when an injured young woman is brought to his office for treatment proves to be Mary Jane Smith and his uncle appears to meet the bride. Mary consents to a temporary deception. Matters become complicated when the uncle insists on their accompanying him on a trip to Hawaii and informs them that he is to marry a Miss Burns, who is Mary's aunt. The troubles of Arthur and Mary become acute on the ship. Finally, an explanation results in forgiveness, and they make the trip a honeymoon by having the ship's captain marry them.

== Cast ==
- Douglas MacLean as Dr. Arthur P. Hampton
- Doris May as Mary Jane Smith
- Victor Potel as Johnny Stokes
- Neal Burns as Stub Masters
- James Gordon as George P. Hampton
- Lizette Thorne as Angelica Burns
- Ida Lewis as Mrs. Merrivale (*Ida Lewis 1855–1935; not Julia Arthur)

== Preservation status ==
A copy of the film is in the Library of Congress.
