= Helpmates =

1932 short film by James Parrott

- Title card
- Directed by: James Parrott
- Written by: H. M. Walker
- Produced by: Hal Roach
- Starring: Stan Laurel; Oliver Hardy
- Cinematography: Art Lloyd
- Edited by: Richard Currier
- Music by: Marvin Hatley; Leroy Shield
- Production company: Hal Roach Studios
- Distributed by: Metro-Goldwyn-Mayer
- Release date: January 23, 1932
- Running time: 21:01
- Country: United States
- Language: English

Helpmates is a Laurel and Hardy Pre-Code short film comedy. It was directed by James Parrott, produced by Hal Roach and released by Metro-Goldwyn Mayer on January 23, 1932.

== Plot ==
Ollie's domicile stands in disarray after an exuberant gathering held the preceding evening. The precarious situation is compounded when Ollie receives a telegram from his vacationing wife, informing him of her imminent return later that day. Fearing the repercussions of his wife returning to a cluttered domicile, Ollie enlists the assistance of his friend Stan to rectify the disorder.

However, their efforts to restore order prove futile, leading to further chaos and exacerbating the predicament. Ollie's frustration mounts as their attempts at cleanup yield unintended consequences, culminating in a calamitous mishap involving the mismanagement of the oven, resulting in a destructive explosion that wreaks havoc upon the living room and kitchen, as well as Ollie's attire and personal effects.

As the situation escalates, Ollie's wardrobe is besmirched by soot, immersed in dirty water, and coated in flour, leaving him with no alternative but to greet his returning wife in a comically inappropriate lodge uniform. Meanwhile, Stan endeavors to salvage the interior aesthetics of the dwelling.

Upon Ollie's return from the train station, bearing physical evidence of his misadventures and notably absent of his spouse, he discovers the lamentable state of his now-smoldering abode, courtesy of Stan's ill-fated attempt to ignite a fire within the hearth. Left to contemplate the wreckage under a deluge of rain, Ollie finds himself seated amidst the ruins.

== Cast ==
- Stan Laurel as Stan Laurel
- Oliver Hardy as Oliver "Ollie" Hardy
- Blanche Payson as Mrs. Hardy
- Robert Callahan as Messenger
- Bobby Burns as Neighbor in garden

== Colorization ==
Helpmates was colorized in 1983 under the auspices of Colorization, Inc., a subsidiary of Hal Roach Studios. Its inaugural public exhibition occurred at the 1984 International Helpmates Convention, organized by The Sons of the Desert, a Laurel and Hardy appreciation society.

The foray into colorization proved to be a lucrative venture for Hal Roach Studios, prompting the subsequent release of the colorized rendition of Way Out West on VHS and Betamax formats under the Hal Roach Studios Film Classics label. Helpmates received similar treatment, alongside The Music Box, in 1986.

Despite its commercial success, the colorization of Laurel and Hardy films was met with criticism. Foremost among the grievances was the alteration or outright removal of entire scenes, thereby compromising the integrity and essence of the original films. In Helpmates, significant modifications included condensing the panning shots of the party debris within Ollie's residence into freeze-frame stills and substantial editing of the pivotal phone conversation between Stan and Ollie regarding Stan's absence from the party due to concerns over hydrophosphates. The most contentious alteration involved the deletion of the scene wherein Ollie inadvertently crashes his head through a dresser drawer after Stan's discovery of a handkerchief.

Despite its completion in 1984, the colorized version of Helpmates was formally copyrighted in 1986. This discrepancy underscores the nuanced timeline of its production and subsequent public release, amidst both commercial success and critical scrutiny.
