= Earl Mohan =

American actor (1889–1928)

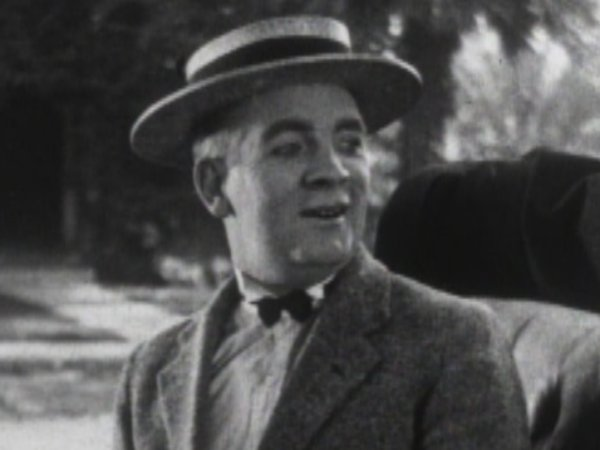
- Mohan in The Fraidy Cat (1924)
- Born: November 12, 1889; Pueblo, Colorado, US
- Died: October 15, 1928 (aged 38); Los Angeles, California, US
- Occupation: Actor
- Years active: 1915–1927

Earl Mohan (November 12, 1889 – October 15, 1928) was an American film actor of the silent era who was born in Pueblo, Colorado, and died in Los Angeles, California. He appeared in about 60 films between 1915 and 1927, usually in short film comedies. He was a leading man in a number of - today forgotten - Hal Roach comedies of the 1920s. Mohan also played in numerous Harold Lloyd films, including his part as the eccentric drunk in Safety Last! (1923).

== Selected filmography ==
- Ragtime Snap Shots (1915)
- A Foozle at the Tee Party (1915)
- Luke and the Rural Roughnecks (1916)
- Luke's Preparedness Preparations (1916)
- Luke, the Gladiator (1916)
- Luke, Patient Provider (1916)
- Luke's Newsie Knockout (1916)
- Luke's Movie Muddle (1916)
- Luke, Rank Impersonator (1916)
- Luke's Fireworks Fizzle (1916)
- Luke Locates the Loot (1916)
- Luke's Shattered Sleep (1916)
- Luke's Lost Liberty (1917)
- Luke's Busy Day (1917)
- Lonesome Luke on Tin Can Alley (1917)
- Heap Big Chief (1919)
- Pay Your Dues (1919)
- Now or Never (1921)
- Safety Last! (1923)
- Frozen Hearts (1923)
- The Whole Truth (1923)
- Mother's Joy (1923)
- Zeb vs. Paprika (1924)
- Near Dublin (1924)
