= May Tully =

Canadian actress, writer, director and producer (1880s–1924)

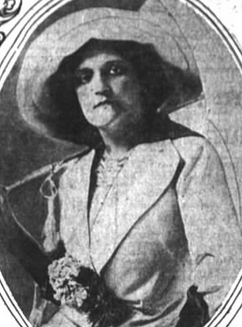
- Tully, from a 1912 newspaper
- Born: Mary Gertrude Tully; 1880s (sources give various dates); Nanaimo, British Columbia, Canada
- Died: March 9, 1924; New York City, United States
- Occupations: Actress, writer, producer

May Tully (born 1880s – March 9, 1924) was a Canadian actress, writer, director, and producer in theatre and film, and, according to sportswriter Damon Runyon, "perhaps the greatest woman baseball fan that ever lived."

== Early life ==
Mary Gertrude Tully was born in Nanaimo, British Columbia, the daughter of Frank Tully and Nancy Hague Tully. After her father died in the 1887 Nanaimo mine explosion when May was a girl, she and her widowed mother moved to Victoria, British Columbia, where her mother remarried. May Tully attended McGill University, and Mrs. Wheatley's Dramatic School in New York.

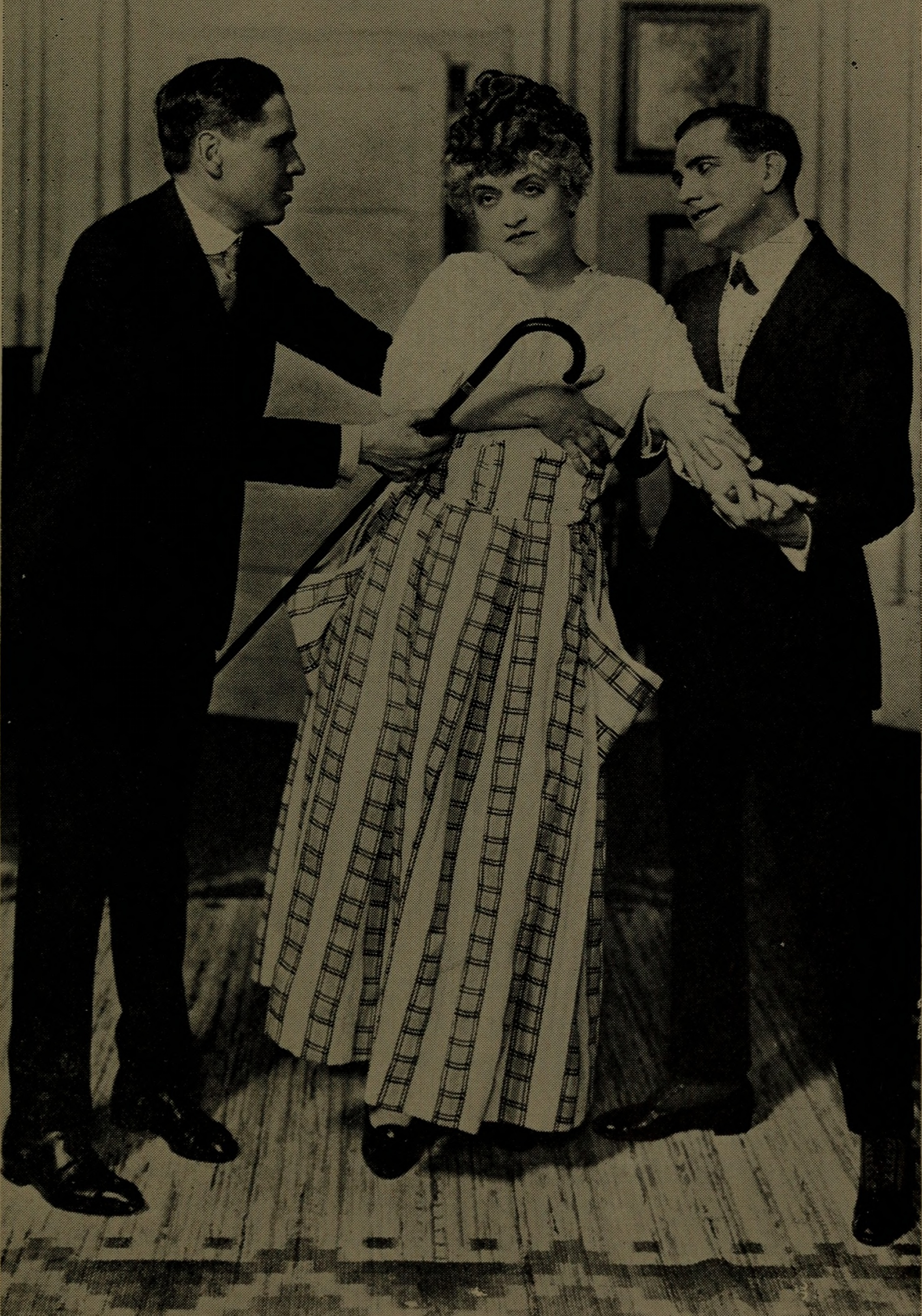
A scene from May Tully's play Mary's Ankle (1916), starring Irene Fenwick.

== Career ==
Tully was credited as a writer on eight silent films: The Winning of Beatrice (1918), Mary's Ankle (1920), His Wife's Money (1920), Bucking the Tiger (1921), The Old Oaken Bucket (1921), Chivalrous Charley (1921), Kisses (1922), and That Old Gang of Mine (1925). In addition, she directed That Old Gang of Mine and The Old Oaken Bucket, and had producer credit on The Old Oaken Bucket.

On stage, Tully acted in shows such as The Christian (1900), In the Good Old Summer Time, and The Two Mr. Wetherbys (1906). She wrote the play Mary's Ankle (1916), "an improbable but delectable farce" starring Irene Fenwick, Zelda Sears, and Bert Lytell on Broadway; it was also a success in other cities.

Tully performed in vaudeville in sketches she wrote, Stop! Look! and Listen! (1907), The Late Mr. Allen (1912), The Battle Cry of Freedom (1912), and Mona Lisa (1914). "She has long been recognized as the over-time worker of the vaudeville world," explained another writer in 1917, adding "She is perhaps the most businesslike of all the lady playwrights." She was the sketch writer for the Palace Theatre in New York, and in 1915 produced a fashion show there, with models, expensive gowns, and jewelry; a popular attraction, The Fashion Show toured the Keith circuit for months, and was refreshed with new fashions in later seasons.

In Curves (1911–1912), a vaudeville sketch she wrote about baseball, she co-starred with off-season professional players Christy Mathewson and Chief Meyers, bringing sports fans to the theatre. Her love of baseball was often noted in reports about the show. "She knows more inside baseball than 99 percent of the fans," acknowledged New York Giants coach Muggsy McGraw.

== Personal life ==
May Tully died from nephritis in 1924, aged about 40 years, in New York City. Headlines after her death highlighted her love and knowledge of baseball. "She had a wide acquaintance among baseball men, players, managers, magnates, and writers," noted Damon Runyon, and was accepted into their company "because of her understanding of the game and its atmosphere."
