= Maternity (play) =

1915 American play

- Written by: Eugène Brieux (Maternité, 1904)
- Original language: English
- Genre: Drama
- Setting: France

Premiere
- Date premiered: January 6, 1915
- Place premiered: Princess Theatre, Broadway

Maternity is a dramatic three act play that opened January 6, 1915, at the Princess Theatre on Broadway starring Richard Bennett.

An English language version of Eugène Brieux's French play, Maternité (1904), the work was translated by Benjamin F. Blanchard. The play's book was adapted by Richard Bennett, whose Purpose Play Society produced.

Unlike Damaged Goods, Bennett's previous socially conscious play by Brieux, Maternity was not an artistic or financial success. Despite special matinées, which were well patronized in the final week, the production ran for only 21 performances before closing.

== Synopsis ==
Maternity deals with out-of-wedlock birth and the relations of motherhood to society.

== Opening night cast ==
Actor	Character
Vera de Cordova	Josephine
Frances Savage	Madeleine
Adrienne Morrison	Lucie Brignac
Mai Estelle	Catherine Tupin
Richard Bennett	Julian Brignac
W. W. Crimmans	Dr. Hourtin
W. L. Romaine	Fechain
Jane Cooper	Annette
Maud Granger	Mme. Bernin
Charles Riegal	Judge of the Court of Assises
W. L. Romaine	Prosecutor
Erville Alderson	Council for the Defense
Isabel Winlocke	Mme. Thomas
Gertrude Workman	Marie Gaubert
W. W. Crimmans	Tupin
Vera de Cordova	Mme. d'Amergueux
George Ferguson	De Forgeau
