= When a Man's a Man (1924 film) =

1924 film

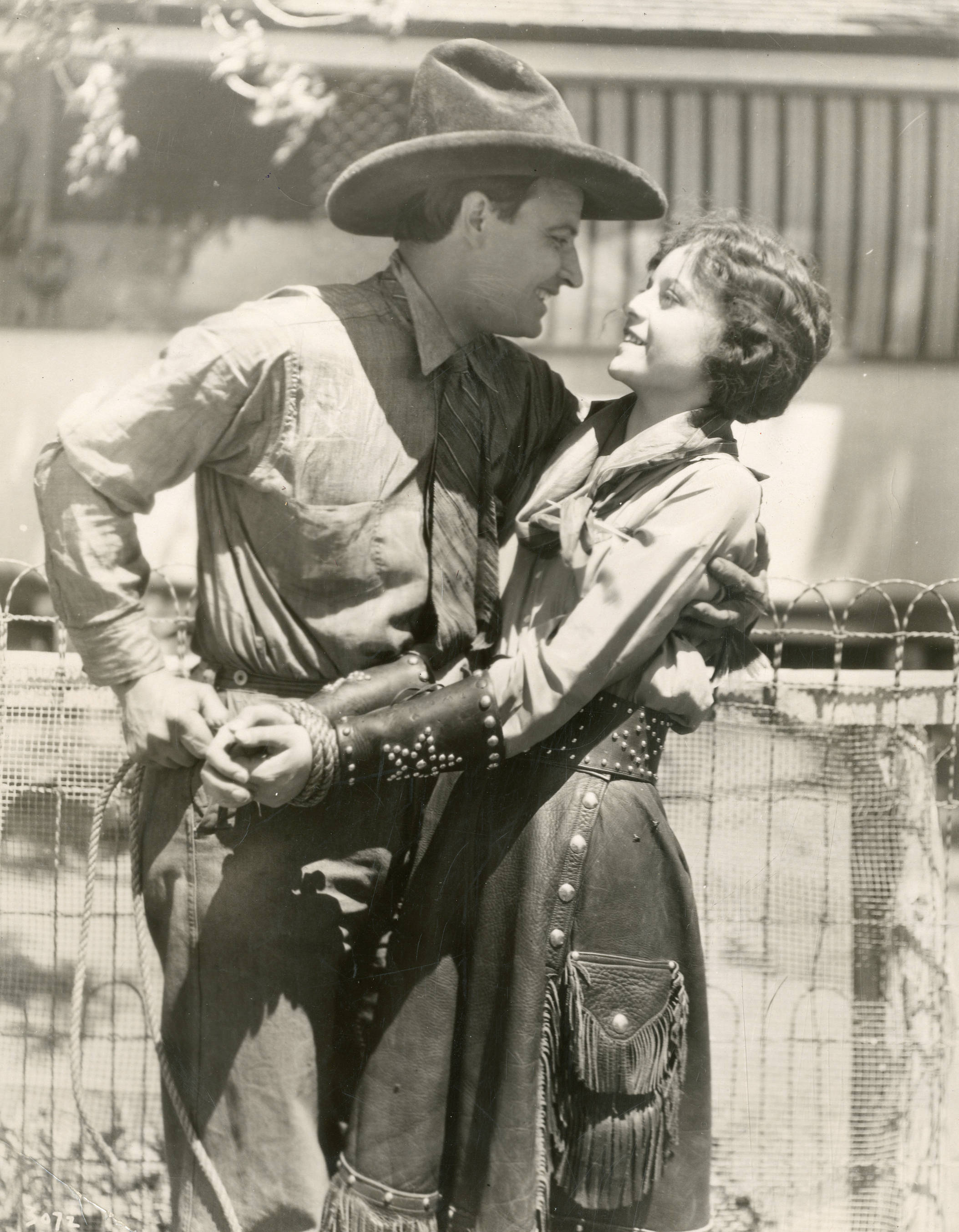
- Still with John Bowers and June Marlowe
- Directed by: Edward F. Cline
- Written by: Walter Anthony; Harry Carr
- Based on: When a Man's a Man by Harold Bell Wright
- Produced by: Sol Lesser
- Starring: John Bowers; Marguerite De La Motte; Robert Frazer
- Cinematography: Harold Janes; Ned Van Buren
- Production company: Principal Pictures
- Distributed by: First National Pictures
- Release date: February 3, 1924
- Running time: 7 reels
- Country: United States
- Languages: Silent; English intertitles

When a Man's a Man is a 1924 American silent Western film directed by Edward F. Cline and starring John Bowers, Marguerite De La Motte, and Robert Frazer.

== Plot ==
As described in a film magazine review, Lawrence Knight, a millionaire loafer, is rejected by his sweetheart Helen Wakefield because he has never done anything worthy of a man. He goes west and obtains work at a ranch in Arizona. Although at first a tenderfoot, he masters the art of riding and roping and becomes a close friend of the foreman, Phil Acton. After attending school in the east, Phil's sweetheart, Kitty Reid, returns to her father's ranch and, believing that she can no longer endure ranch life, tells Phil that she cannot marry him. Phil becomes jealous of Knight and comes to believe that he is in league with a gang of cattle thieves. During a trip to the hills, Phil is shot in the back and seriously wounded by a cattle thief. Knight is accused of the deed, but proves his innocence just before he is to be hanged. Following the shooting of Phil, Kitty decides that she does love him after all and consents to marry him. Knight buys a ranch and presents it to Phil as a wedding gift.

== Cast ==
- John Bowers as Lawrence Knight, 'Patches'
- Marguerite De La Motte as Helen Wakefield
- Robert Frazer as Phil Acton
- June Marlowe as Kitty Reid
- Forrest Robinson as The Dean
- Elizabeth Rhodes as Stella
- Fred R. Stanton as Nick Cambert
- George Hackathorne as Yapavai Joe
- Edward Hearn as Stanley Manning
- Johnny Fox as Little Billy
- Arthur Hoyt as Professor Parkhill
- Ray "Red" Thompson as Curley Elson
- Charles Hill Mailes as Jim Reid

== Production ==
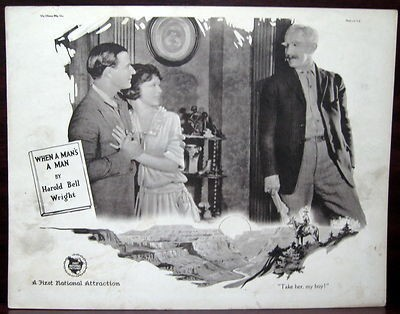

When a Man's a Man was filmed on location in and around Prescott, Arizona. Bowers broke his leg in a scene while bulldogging a steer.

== Preservation ==
An incomplete copy of When a Man's a Man is held by the UCLA Film & Television Archive.

== Bibliography ==
- Darby, William (1991). Masters of Lens and Light: A Checklist of Major Cinematographers and Their Feature Films. Scarecrow Press. ISBN 0-810-82454-X
