= The Enchanted Hill =

1926 film by Irvin Willat

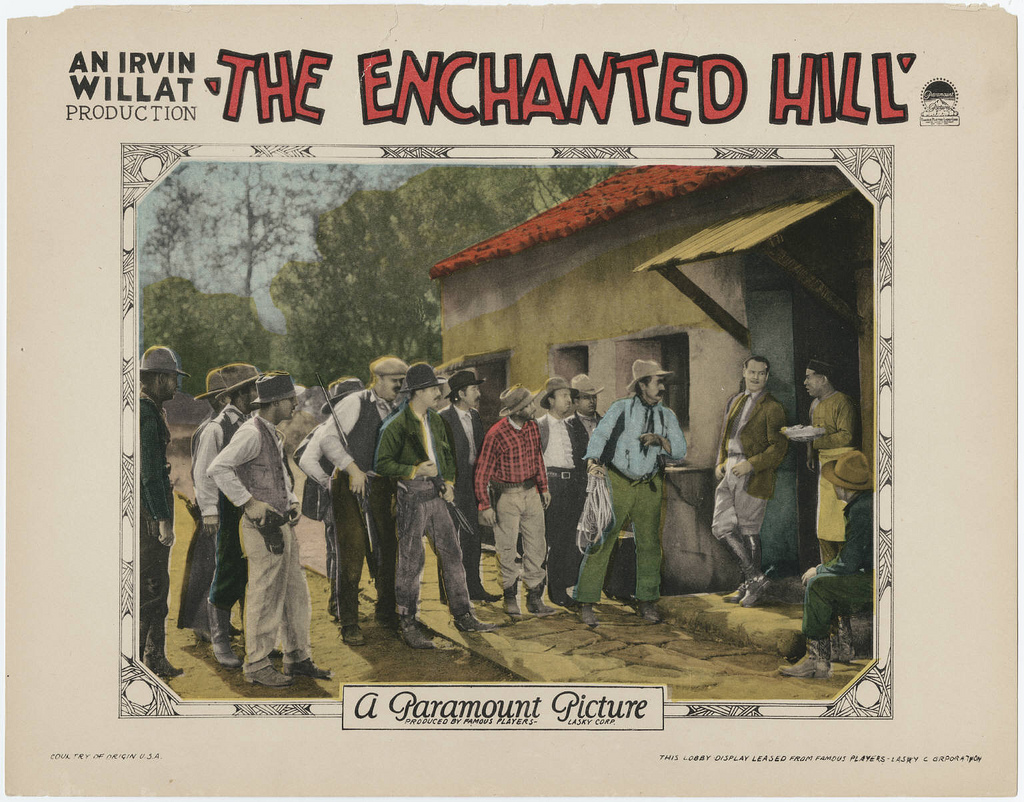
- Theatrical release poster
- Directed by: Irvin Willat
- Screenplay by: James Shelley Hamilton; Peter B. Kyne
- Produced by: Jesse L. Lasky; Adolph Zukor
- Starring: Jack Holt; Florence Vidor; Noah Beery Sr. Mary Brian; Richard Arlen
- Cinematography: Alfred Gilks
- Production company: Famous Players–Lasky Corporation
- Distributed by: Paramount Pictures
- Release date: January 18, 1926
- Running time: 70 minutes
- Country: United States
- Language: Silent (English intertitles)

The Enchanted Hill is a 1926 American silent Western film directed by Irvin Willat and written by James Shelley Hamilton and Peter B. Kyne. The film stars Jack Holt, Florence Vidor, Noah Beery Sr., Mary Brian, Richard Arlen, George Bancroft, and Ray Thompson. The film was released on January 18, 1926, by Paramount Pictures.

== Plot ==
As described in a film magazine review, a young ranch owner on whose land is a fortune of which he is unaware, falls in love with his fair neighbor when she arrives to take charge of the property left her by an uncle. She secretly returns the man's love, but is in doubt of him because he seems reckless and has many enemies. For a near killing the rancher's cook is set on by a mob but is rescued by his employer. This incident gives rise to a series of desperate events in which the hero and the heroine several times narrowly escape death. In the end, their difficulties dissolve and the course of their love becomes smooth.

== Cast ==
- Jack Holt as Lee Purdy
- Florence Vidor as Gail Ormsby
- Noah Beery Sr. as Jake Dort
- Mary Brian as Hallie Purdy
- Richard Arlen as Link Halliwell
- George Bancroft as Ira Todd
- Ray "Red" Thompson as Tommy Scaife
- Brandon Hurst as Jasper Doak
- Henry Hebert as Bud Shannon
- George Kuwa as Chan
- Mathilde Comont as Conchita
- Willard Cooley as Curley MacMahon
- George Magrill as Killer

== Preservation ==
With no prints of The Enchanted Hill located in any film archives, it is considered a lost film.
