= Lonesome Luke on Tin Can Alley =

1917 film by Hal Roach

- Directed by: Hal Roach
- Produced by: Hal Roach
- Starring: Harold Lloyd
- Distributed by: Pathé Exchange
- Release date: April 15, 1917
- Running time: 10 minutes
- Country: United States
- Languages: Silent; English intertitles

Lonesome Luke on Tin Can Alley is a 1917 American silent short comedy film starring Harold Lloyd. A print of the film survives in the film archive of the Museum of Modern Art.

== Cast ==
- Harold Lloyd - Lonesome Luke
- Bebe Daniels - Bebe
- Snub Pollard
- Marie Mosquini
- S.B. Smith
- Margaret Joslin - (as Margaret Joslin Todd)
- Harry Todd
- Joe Turner
- Sammy Brooks
- Bud Jamison - Cafe owner
- W.L. Adams
- Elmer Ballard
- Billy Fay
- Fred C. Newmeyer
- Gus Leonard
- Gilbert Pratt
- Charles Stevenson
- Dorothea Wolbert
- Earl Mohan

== See also ==
- Harold Lloyd filmography
