= Sidney De Gray =

English actor (1866–1941)

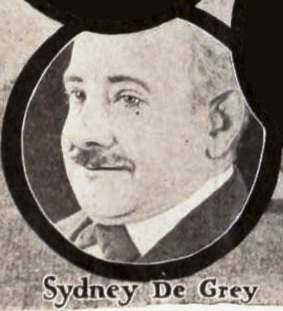
- Cropped image of De Gray from advertisement for The Half Breed (1922)
- Born: 16 June 1866; England
- Died: 30 June 1941 (aged 75); Los Angeles, California, USA
- Occupation: Actor
- Years active: 1913–1940

Sidney De Gray (16 June 1866 – 30 June 1941) was an English actor of the silent era. He appeared in more than 70 films between 1913 and 1940. He was born in England and died in Los Angeles, California.

== Selected filmography ==
- Luke's Fireworks Fizzle (1916)
- Luke Locates the Loot (1916)
- Luke's Shattered Sleep (1916)
- Luke's Lost Liberty (1917)
- Luke's Busy Day (1917)
- Luke's Trolley Troubles (1917)
- Lonesome Luke, Lawyer (1917)
- Luke Wins Ye Ladye Faire (1917)
- Lonesome Luke's Lively Life (1917)
- Lonesome Luke, Mechanic (1917)
- His Birthright (1918)
- Alias Mary Brown (1918)
- The Reckoning Day (1918)
- Almost a Husband (1919)
- The Chorus Girl's Romance (1920)
- The Mark of Zorro (1920)
- The Innocent Cheat (1921)
- The Nut (1921)
- The Half Breed (1922)
- One Wonderful Night (1922)
- Around the World in Eighteen Days (1923)
- The Gentleman from America (1923)
- The Love Brand (1923)
- Rouged Lips (1923)
- Other Men's Daughters (1923)
- The Oregon Trail (1923)
- Single Handed (1923)
- Trifling with Honor (1923)
- The Wild Party (1923)
- Wine of Youth (1924)
- My Man (1924)
- Steele of the Royal Mounted (1925)
- Brand of Cowardice (1925)
- The Silver Treasure (1926)
- The Call of the Wilderness (1926)
- Forest Havoc (1926)
- The Amateur Gentleman (1926)
- Bitter Apples (1927)
- Closed Gates (1927)
- The Three Sisters (1930)
- Just Imagine (1930)
