= Luke's Fireworks Fizzle =

1916 film by Hal Roach

- Directed by: Hal Roach
- Produced by: Hal Roach
- Starring: Harold Lloyd
- Distributed by: Pathé Exchange
- Release date: December 17, 1916
- Running time: 1 reel
- Country: United States
- Language: Silent with English intertitles

Luke's Fireworks Fizzle is a 1916 American short comedy film starring Harold Lloyd.

== Cast ==
- Harold Lloyd as Luke
- Bebe Daniels
- Snub Pollard
- Charles Stevenson (as Charles E. Stevenson)
- Billy Fay
- Fred C. Newmeyer
- Sammy Brooks
- Bud Jamison
- Earl Mohan
- Vesta Marlowe
- Peggy Prevost (as Marjory Prevost)
- Villatta Singley
- Madeline Vintin
- Sidney De Gray
- William Brown (as William N. Brown)
- Frank Lake

== See also ==
- Harold Lloyd filmography
