= The Colored American Winning His Suit =

- Written by: W. S. Smith
- Produced by: W. S. Smith
- Starring: Thomas M. Mosley; Ida Askins
- Production company: Frederick Douglass Film Company
- Release date: July 14, 1916
- Running time: Five reels
- Country: United States
- Language: Silent

The Colored American Winning His Suit is a lost 1916 race film, the first production of the Frederick Douglass Film Company. It was written and produced by the Reverend W. S. Smith, pastor of the Monumental Baptist Church of Jersey City, New Jersey, and also a member of the production company. The New York Age hailed it as "the first five-reel Film Drama written, directed, acted and produced by Negroes." Its purpose was to counter anti-African-American films and improve race relations.

The film premiered at the Majestic Theatre in Jersey City to an "interracial audience of over 800" on July 14, 1916. The New York Age review states it was to have its first run at the Lincoln Theatre in Harlem, New York City. According to the American Film Institute, it opened in New York on July 23 and in Baltimore on August 29.

== Plot ==
An ex-slave prospers and eventually buys the Virginia estate of his former master. He sends his son Bob to Howard University, where he becomes a lawyer.

When Bob comes home, he meets his sister Bessie's classmate and friend Alma Eaton. They fall in love, but her parents have chosen another man for her, Jim Sample. Bowing to her parents' wishes, Alma breaks up with Bob. However, when Alma's father is charged with theft at the behest of business rival Mr. Hinderus, Bob comes to the rescue and is rewarded with Alma's hand in marriage.

== Cast ==
- Thomas M. Mosley as Bob Winall
- Ida Askins as Alma Elton
- Florence Snead as Bessie Winall
- Marshall Davies as Jim Sample
- F. King as Mr. Hinderus
- Fred Leighton as Col. Goodwill
- Edgar Snead as Bob's Father
- Mrs. E. Snead as Bob's Mother
- Thomas Wheeler as Alma's Father
- Minnie Smith as Alma's Mother
- Fred Quinn as Detective

== Production ==
None of the actors had any previous training or experience. They were recruited from families residing in or around Jersey City.

Filming took place in Virginia, Jersey City and nearby towns, and on the campus of Howard University.
