= Luke, Rank Impersonator =

1916 film

- Directed by: Hal Roach
- Produced by: Hal Roach
- Starring: Harold Lloyd
- Distributed by: Pathé Exchange
- Release date: December 10, 1916
- Country: United States
- Languages: Silent; English intertitles

Luke, Rank Impersonator is a 1916 American short comedy film starring Harold Lloyd. It is considered a lost film.

== Cast ==
- Harold Lloyd - Luke
- Bebe Daniels
- Snub Pollard
- Charles Stevenson - (as Charles E. Stevenson)
- Billy Fay
- Fred C. Newmeyer
- Sammy Brooks
- Harry Todd
- Bud Jamison
- Margaret Joslin - (as Mrs. Harry Todd)
- Earl Mohan
- Jewel Mason
- Peggy Heinse
- Estelle Short - (as Estella Short)
- Vesta Marlowe
- Peggy Prevost - (as Marjory Prevost)
- Villatta Singley
- Madeline Vintin

== See also ==
- Harold Lloyd filmography
