= The Bruiser =

1916 film by Charles Bartlett

- Directed by: Charles Bartlett
- Starring: Charlotte Burton; William Russell
- Distributed by: Mutual Film
- Release date: March 23, 1916
- Running time: 5 reels
- Country: United States
- Languages: Silent film English intertitles

The Bruiser is a 1916 American silent drama film directed by Charles Bartlett. The film stars Charlotte Burton and William Russell.

The film depicts a dispute between honest dock workers and a corrupt management, and has been cited as an example of a "liberal film".

== Cast ==
- William Russell as "Big Bill" Brawley
- Charlotte Burton as Fen Bernham
- George Ferguson as Modest Tim
- Lizette Thorne as Norma Kenwick
- Roy Stewart as Manson Kenwick
- Pete Morrison as Charley, Fen's brother
- Al Fordyce as Munsey
- Eric Jacobs as Butler
