= George Ferguson (actor) =

American actor

- Ferguson with Maud Milton in Omaha, Nebraska, c. 1913
- Born: George Hart Ferguson; February 10, 1890; Boston, Massachusetts, USA
- Died: October 1961 (aged 71); New Jersey, USA
- Years active: 1913 to 1916
- Spouse: Esther Sharkey

George Hart Ferguson (February 10, 1890 – October 1961) was an American actor. He performed on the stage and in silent movies.

Ferguson appeared in two movies, Damaged Goods (1914) and The Bruiser (1916). He also toured with Richard Bennett in the stage production of Damaged Goods and appeared on Broadway in Maternity (1915), also with Bennett.

== Early life ==
He was born on Brookline Street in Boston, Massachusetts, one of 10 children of Andrew Ferguson and Mary McIntire. His father was Scottish and his mother Scottish American.

== Acting career ==
At an early age, George left home to work in the circus. Eventually he turned to the stage. His big break came when he joined the Richard Bennett's theatre company performing in the controversial play, Damaged Goods, which told the story of a prominent man diagnosed with syphilis.

In 1914, the American Film Company convinced Bennett to film a screen adaptation of Damaged Goods. The movie featured much the same cast as had toured with the play, including Ferguson, who played "the quack's assistant." In 1915, he was cast in Bennett's production of Eugène Brieux's Maternity, which ran for 21 performances at the Princess Theatre on Broadway.

The only other movie that Ferguson is known to have appeared in was 1916's The Bruiser, in which he plays "Modest Tim."

== Career after show business ==
By the time of America's involvement in World War I, Ferguson was working at A.M. Home Music Company in Boston, as a piano salesman. He served for 12 months in the U.S. Army and was stationed in France with the rank of ammunition sergeant for the 301st Field Artillery.

Ferguson was involved in local theatre, such as the Old Timbuctoo Tribe.

He married Esther Marie Sharkey on September 17, 1921, in Winthrop, Massachusetts, where the couple had two sons, Dalton Hart Ferguson and Milton (later Bruce) Hart Ferguson.

George Ferguson died at age 71 in New Jersey.
