= Luke's Lost Liberty =

1917 film by Hal Roach

- Directed by: Hal Roach
- Produced by: Hal Roach
- Starring: Harold Lloyd
- Release date: January 7, 1917
- Country: United States
- Languages: Silent; English intertitles

Luke's Lost Liberty is a 1917 American short comedy film starring Harold Lloyd.

== Cast ==
- Harold Lloyd - Lonesome Luke
- Bebe Daniels
- Snub Pollard
- Charles Stevenson - (as Charles E. Stevenson)
- Billy Fay
- Sammy Brooks
- Bud Jamison
- Earl Mohan
- Sidney De Gray
- Ray Thompson
- Jack Perrin

== See also ==
- Harold Lloyd filmography
