= Helen Marten (silent film actor) =

Silent film actor

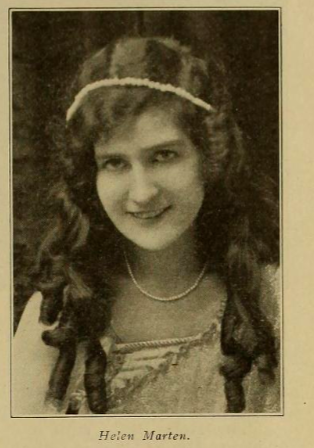
- From Motography magazine, 1914
- Born: c. 1894; Washington, D.C.
- Occupation: Actress
- Years active: 1914–1917 (film)

Helen Marten (c. 1894 – unknown) was an American silent film actor known as "The Gibson Girl." Because she had long, dark hair, she was sometimes cast in the part of an indigenous woman, for example playing the role of "The Lone Trail Maid" in the 1913 Canadian film The Great Unknown. Her slim, angular figure also allowed her to occasionally play male roles.

== Early life and career ==
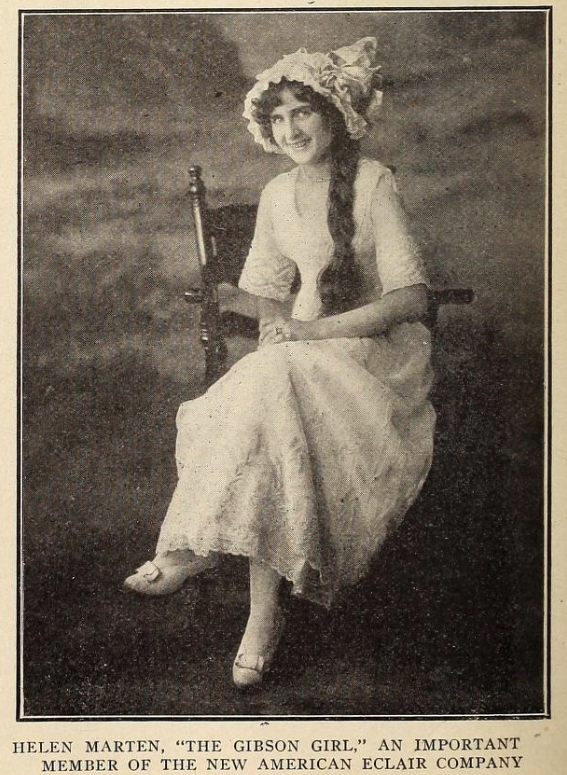
In 1911, from Moving Picture World.

Marten was born in Washington, DC, and Photoplay claimed she was 19 in 1913, putting her approximate birth year as 1894, although movie magazines could be notoriously inaccurate on age. Her nickname was "The Gibson Girl," because she won first place over 4,000 contestants in the New York World "Gibson Girl" beauty contest sponsored by a fabric company, Spring Maid, that was an occasional route to movie contracts. Some movie magazines claimed she had actually posed for artist Charles Dana Gibson.

Marten began acting at age six on the stage, playing the part of little Eva in one of the "Uncle Tom" touring shows. She first appeared in films for the Lubin Stock Company in 1912, then moving to the Eclair Company. Among her films for Eclair in 1913 were The Spectre Bridegroom, The Trail of the Silver Fox, Right of Way, Rosary, For Better or Worse, Jacques the Wolf, Over the Cliffs, and Big-Hearted Jim.

A Gaumont-Mutual film, "An Idol of the Stage," opened at the beginning of 1916, and reviews were mixed, although critic Wid Gunning praised her for her small part. "The Man from Nowhere" (Red Feather Photoplays) opened in the summer, and she seemed to have been moving from studio to studio. In October 1916 Photoplay magazine reported that she was no longer appearing in films. By 1917 she was making fewer films, including "Corruption," and Motion Picture News announced that she was going on location to Miami, Florida for several weeks as the head of a group of actors working with under-sea diver Tom Barry to make "underwater pictures for the Universal." In October The Answer Man, a column written pseudonymously by Elizabeth M. Heinemann, and the most popular column in Motion Picture Magazine, replied that she had moved to Vitagraph studios; after 1917 she no longer appeared in the motion picture news, or at least not under that name.
