= Luke's Busy Day =

1917 film by Hal Roach

- Directed by: Hal Roach
- Produced by: Hal Roach
- Starring: Harold Lloyd
- Release date: January 21, 1917
- Country: United States
- Languages: Silent; English intertitles

Luke's Busy Day is a 1917 American short comedy film starring Harold Lloyd.

== Cast ==
- Harold Lloyd - Lonesome Luke
- Bebe Daniels
- Snub Pollard
- Bud Jamison
- Sidney De Gray
- Earl Mohan

== See also ==
- Harold Lloyd filmography
