= Luke's Movie Muddle =

1916 film

- Directed by: Hal Roach
- Produced by: Hal Roach
- Starring: Harold Lloyd
- Distributed by: Pathé Exchange
- Release date: December 3, 1916
- Running time: 7 minutes
- Country: United States
- Languages: Silent; English intertitles

Luke's Movie Muddle is a 1916 American short comedy film starring Harold Lloyd. Prints of the film survive in various film archives around the world, including George Eastman Museum and the Filmoteca Española.

== Cast ==
- Harold Lloyd as Luke
- Bebe Daniels
- Snub Pollard as Projectionist
- Charles Stevenson (as Charles E. Stevenson)
- Billy Fay
- Fred C. Newmeyer
- Sammy Brooks
- Harry Todd
- Bud Jamison
- Margaret Joslin (as Mrs. Harry Todd)
- Earl Mohan as Customer with glasses
- Eva Thatcher (as Evelyn Thatcher)

== See also ==
- Harold Lloyd filmography
