= Blanche Payson =

American actress (1881–1964)

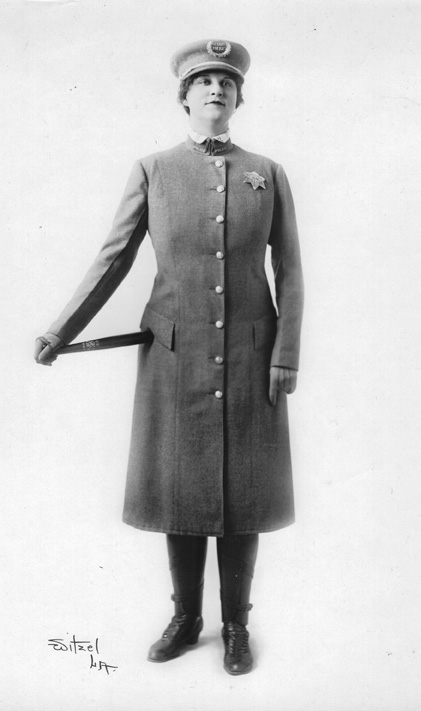
- Payson, ca. 1915
- Born: Mary Elizabeth Bush; September 20, 1881; Santa Barbara, California, US
- Died: July 4, 1964 (aged 82); Hollywood, California, US
- Years active: 1916–1946
- Spouses: Eugene Payson; Allen Love

Blanche Payson (born Mary Elizabeth Bush, September 20, 1881 – July 4, 1964) was an American film actress.

== Biography ==
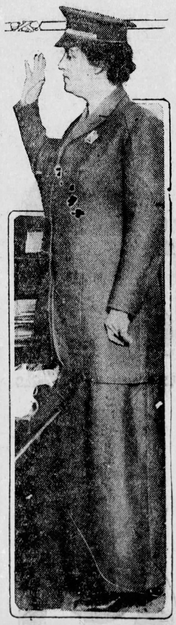
Blanche Payson, policewoman ceremony, 1915

Payson was born in Santa Barbara, California, as Mary Elizabeth Bush to Thomas and Sarah Bush. She first attracted public notice when she served as policewoman in the Toyland exhibit at the Panama Exposition in San Francisco in 1915. She also performed in vaudeville.

In 1910 she was living in San Francisco and married to Eugene Payson, who died before 1915.

Payson then moved to Los Angeles and began her film career with the Mack Sennett studio, with her first film being Wife and Auto Trouble. She appeared in short films in mostly uncredited roles. She appeared in nearly 160 films between 1916 and 1946. At 6 ft 2 in (188 cm), she towered over both men and women co-stars in the many slapstick comedies she appeared, as a foil for such comedians as The Three Stooges, Laurel and Hardy and similar popular acts of the time. She often played brutal and dominant women, such as Oliver Hardy's wife in Helpmates (1932) or Bobby Hutchins' stepmother in the Our Gang comedy Dogs Is Dogs (1931).

By 1927, Payson was married to Allen Love. She died in Hollywood, California.

== Partial filmography ==
- Wife and Auto Trouble (1916)
- A La Cabaret (1916)
- A Social Cub (1916)
- The Sultan's Wife (1917)
- Bears and Bad Men (1918)
- The Land of Jazz (1920)
- Three Ages (1923)
- Charley's Aunt (1925)
- Oh Doctor! (1925)
- Half a Man (1925)
- We Moderns (1925)
- La Bohème (1926)
- For Heaven's Sake (1926)
- Peaceful Oscar (1927)
- Should Men Walk Home? (1927)
- The Bachelor's Baby (1927)
- Figures Don't Lie (1927)
- The Broadway Melody (1929)
- Below Zero (1930)
- Our Wife (1931)
- Dogs Is Dogs (1931)
- I Surrender Dear (1931)
- Helpmates (1932)
- The Impatient Maiden (1932)
- Drifting Souls (1932)
- Impatient Maiden (1932)
- Among the Missing (1934)
- Hoi Polloi (1935)
- Dizzy Doctors (1937)
- All Over Town (1937)
- Slander House (1938)
- Cookoo Cavaliers (1940)
- An Ache in Every Stake (1941)
- Blondie for Victory (1942)
- Ghosts on the Loose (1943)
