= The Fate of the Dolphin =

1916 short film by Tom Ricketts

- Directed by: Tom Ricketts
- Starring: Perry Banks; Ed Coxen; George Field; Lizette Thorne; Harry Van Meter
- Production company: Fine Arts
- Distributed by: Mutual Film
- Release date: June 26, 1916
- Country: United States
- Languages: Silent film English intertitles

The Fate of the Dolphin is a 1916 American silent short drama film directed by Thomas Ricketts starring Perry Banks, Ed Coxen, George Field, Lizette Thorne, and Harry Van Meter.
