= Frederick Douglass Film Company =

The Frederick Douglass Film Company was an early American film production company in Jersey City, New Jersey. It was established in 1916, soon after the pioneering Lincoln Motion Picture Company, by prominent African-American business and professional men from New Jersey. The intent of the founders was to counter anti-African-American films such as The Birth of a Nation (1915) and to improve race relations. It was named after the African-American abolitionist Frederick Douglass.

Its first film, The Colored American Winning His Suit, debuted at the Majestic Theatre in Jersey City on July 14, 1916, to an "interracial audience of over 800." The film is a love story about a lawyer and was hailed by The New York Age as "the first five-reel Film Drama written, directed, acted and produced by Negroes."

It only produced two more films, in 1917 and 1919.

== Filmography ==
- The Colored American Winning His Suit (1916), written by Reverend Dr. W. S. Smith
- The Scapegoat (1917), based on the short story "The Scapegoat" by Paul Laurence Dunbar
- Heroic Negro Soldiers of the World War (1919), directed by William S. Smith
