= Lizette Thorne =

English-born silent film actress

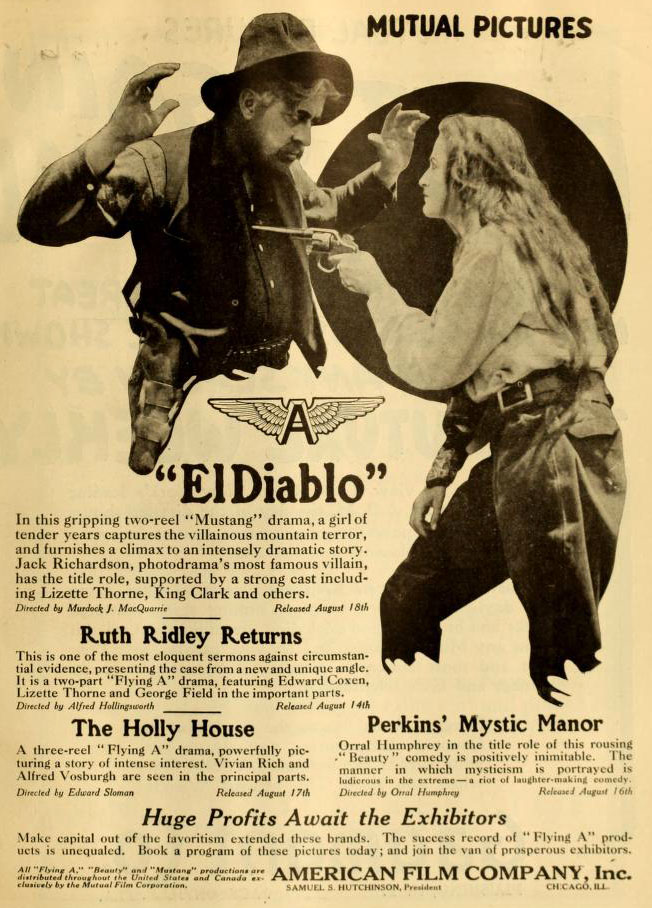
- Jack Richardson and Lizette Thorne in El Diablo (1916)
- Born: 24 November 1882; Birmingham, England
- Died: 3 November 1970 (aged 87); Los Angeles, California, U.S.
- Occupation: Actress
- Years active: 1912–1922

Lizette Thorne (24 November 1882 – 3 November 1970) was an English-born silent film actress. She starred in 45 films in her career, including The Thoroughbred and The Bruiser with actress Charlotte Burton. Thorne's film career began in 1912; she retired in 1921.

== Partial filmography ==
- The Resolve (1915)
- In the Sunset Country (1915)
- The Thoroughbred (1916)
- True Nobility (1916)
- The Key (1916)
- The Dreamer (1916)
- The Bruiser (1916)
- The Fate of the Dolphin (1916)
- Faith (1916)
- A Dream or Two Ago (1916)
- Mary's Ankle (1920)
- Penny of Top Hill Trail (1921)
- A Broken Doll (1921)
