= Luke's Trolley Troubles =

1917 film by Hal Roach

- Directed by: Hal Roach
- Produced by: Hal Roach
- Starring: Harold Lloyd
- Release date: February 4, 1917
- Country: United States
- Languages: Silent; English intertitles

Luke's Trolley Troubles is a 1917 short comedy film starring Harold Lloyd.

== Cast ==
- Harold Lloyd as Lonesome Luke
- Bebe Daniels
- Snub Pollard
- Sammy Brooks
- Bud Jamison
- Gus Leonard
- Sidney De Gray
- Harvey L. Kinney
- Vera Reynolds
- Max Hamburger

== See also ==
- Harold Lloyd filmography
