= A La Cabaret =

1916 short film

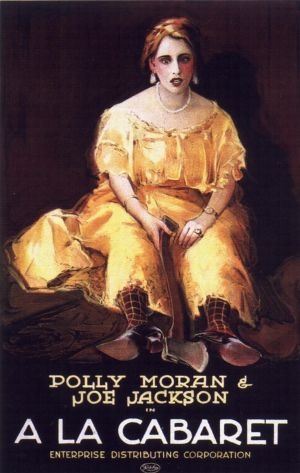
- Film poster
- Directed by: Walter Wright
- Written by: Walter Wright
- Produced by: Mack Sennett
- Starring: Ora Carew; Joseph Belmont; Blanche Payson; Joseph Callahan
- Cinematography: L.B. Jenkins
- Distributed by: Keystone Film Company
- Release date: August 19, 1916
- Running time: 2 reels
- Country: United States
- Languages: Silent film English intertitles

A La Cabaret is a 1916 silent comedy short directed and written by Walter Wright and starring Ora Carew, Joseph Belmont, Blanche Payson, and Joseph Callahan. The film premiered on August 19, 1916.

The black and white film was produced by Mack Sennett and the cinematographer was L.B. Jenkins.

== Cast ==
- Ora Carew
- Joseph Belmont
- Blanche Payson
- Joseph Callahan
- Nick Cogley
- Malcolm St. Clair
- Lallah Rookh Hart

== Crew ==
- Keystone Film Company production
- distributed by Triangle Film Corporation
- Produced by Mack Sennett
- Production supervision by Mack Sennett
- Assistant director, Andy Anderson
- Cinematography by L.B. Jenkins

== Trivia ==
The film is a remake of a 1912 film, Mabel's Stratagem.
