= Luke, Patient Provider =

1916 film by Hal Roach

- Directed by: Hal Roach
- Produced by: Hal Roach
- Starring: Harold Lloyd
- Distributed by: Pathé Exchange
- Release date: November 19, 1916
- Country: United States
- Languages: Silent; English intertitles

Luke, Patient Provider is a 1916 American short comedy film starring Harold Lloyd.

== Cast ==
- Harold Lloyd as Luke
- Bebe Daniels
- Snub Pollard
- Charles Stevenson (as Charles E. Stevenson)
- Billy Fay
- Fred C. Newmeyer
- Sammy Brooks
- Harry Todd
- Bud Jamison
- Margaret Joslin (as Mrs. Harry Todd)
- Earl Mohan
- Minna Browne
- Estelle Harrison
- Dee Lampton

== See also ==
- Harold Lloyd filmography
