= Luke and the Rural Roughnecks =

1916 film by Hal Roach

- Directed by: Hal Roach
- Produced by: Hal Roach
- Starring: Harold Lloyd
- Release date: March 1, 1916
- Country: United States
- Languages: Silent; English intertitles

Luke and the Rural Roughnecks is a 1916 American short comedy film starring Harold Lloyd. A print exits in the Fundacion Cinematica Argentina film archive.

== Cast ==
- Harold Lloyd - Lonesome Luke
- Snub Pollard
- Earl Mohan
- Bebe Daniels

== See also ==
- Harold Lloyd filmography
