= Luke Locates the Loot =

1916 film

- Directed by: Hal Roach
- Produced by: Hal Roach
- Starring: Harold Lloyd
- Distributed by: Pathé Exchange
- Release date: December 24, 1916
- Running time: 1 reel
- Country: United States
- Language: Silent with English intertitles

Luke Locates the Loot is a 1916 American silent comedy short film starring Harold Lloyd. A print of the film survives in the BFI National Archive.

== Cast ==
- Harold Lloyd as Lonesome Luke
- Bebe Daniels
- Snub Pollard
- Billy Fay
- Fred C. Newmeyer
- Sammy Brooks
- Bud Jamison
- Earl Mohan
- Vesta Marlowe
- Sidney De Gray
- Ray Thompson
- Norman Napier - (as Norman DePure)
- Minnie Eckhardt - (as Minnie Eckert)
- Lillian Avery
- Maybelle Beringer - (as Maybelle Buringer)
- Gusta Berg
- Beth Darwin
- Villatta Singley
- Lola Walker
- Hilda Limbeck
- Annette Hatten
- Frances Scott
- Charles Stevenson - (as Charles E. Stevenson)

== See also ==
- Harold Lloyd filmography
