= List of American films of 1915 =

Around 600 American feature films, and over 5,630 short films were released in the year 1915.

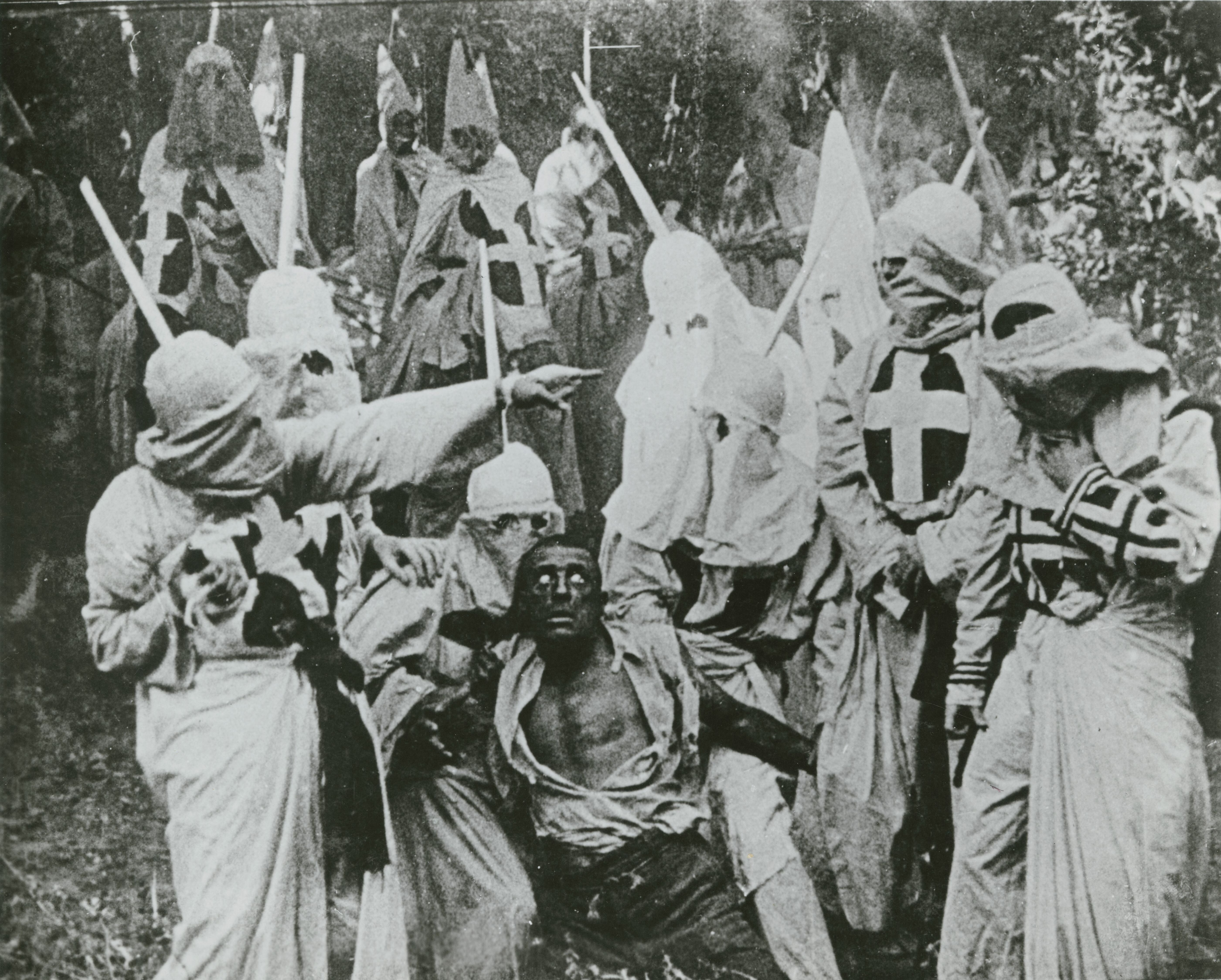
The Birth of a Nation

== A–F ==
Title	Director	Cast	Genre	Studio
The Absentee	Christy Cabanne	Robert Edeson, Olga Grey	Drama	Mutual Film
After Dark	Frederick A. Thomson	Alec B. Francis, Eric Maxon	Crime	World Film
After Five	Cecil B. DeMille	Edward Abeles, Sessue Hayakawa	Comedy	Paramount
Alias Jimmy Valentine	Maurice Tourneur	Robert Warwick, Alec B. Francis	Crime	World Film
The Alster Case	J. Charles Haydon	Bryant Washburn, Ruth Stonehouse	Mystery	Essanay
Always in the Way	J. Searle Dawley	Mary Miles Minter, Lowell Sherman	Drama	Metro
An Affair of Three Nations	Ashley Miller	Arnold Daly, Sheldon Lewis	Mystery	Pathé Exchange
Anna Karenina	J. Gordon Edwards	Betty Nansen and Edward José	Historical drama	Fox Film
Anselo Lee	Harry Handworth	Antonio Moreno, Naomi Childers	Drama	Vitagraph
The Apaches of Paris	Robert Ellis	Edna Hibbard, Robert Ellis	Drama	Kalem
The Arab	Cecil B. DeMille	Edgar Selwyn, Horace B. Carpenter	Adventure	Paramount
Are You a Mason?	Thomas N. Heffron	John Barrymore, Helen Freeman	Comedy	Paramount
Armstrong's Wife	George Melford	Edna Goodrich, Thomas Meighan, James Cruze	Drama	Paramount
At Bay	George Fitzmaurice	Florence Reed, Frank Sheridan	Drama	Pathé Exchange
Barbara Frietchie	Herbert Blaché	Mary Miles Minter, Fraunie Fraunholz	Drama	Metro
The Barnstormers	James W. Horne	Myrtle Tannehill, Marin Sais	Comedy	Kalem
The Battle Cry of Peace	Wilfrid North, J. Stuart Blackton	Charles Richman, Norma Talmadge, Charles Kent	War drama	Vitagraph
The Beachcomber	Phil Rosen	Hobart Bosworth	Drama	Paramount
Bella Donna	Edwin S. Porter, Hugh Ford	Pauline Frederick, Thomas Holding, Julian L'Estrange	Drama	Paramount
The Beloved Vagabond	Edward José	Edwin Arden, Florence Deshon	Romance	Pathé Exchange
Betty in Search of a Thrill	Phillips Smalley, Lois Weber	Elsie Janis, Owen Moore, Juanita Hansen	Adventure	Paramount
Between Men	William S. Hart	William S. Hart, Enid Markey, House Peters	Drama	Triangle Film
The Bigger Man	John W. Noble	Henry Kolker, Renee Kelly	Drama	Fox Film
The Birth of a Nation	D. W. Griffith	Lillian Gish, Mae Marsh, Henry B. Walthall	Epic	Independent
Black Fear	John W. Noble	Grace Valentine, Franklyn Hanna	Drama	Metro
A Black Sheep	Thomas N. Heffron	Otis Harlan, Grace Darmond	Comedy	Selig
Blackbirds	J. P. McGowan	Laura Hope Crews, Thomas Meighan, Raymond Hatton	Drama	Paramount
Blindness of Devotion	J. Gordon Edwards	Robert B. Mantell, Stuart Holmes	Drama	Fox Film
The Blindness of Virtue	Joseph Byron Totten	Bryant Washburn, Edna Mayo	Drama	Essanay
Body and Soul	George Irving	Florence Rockwell, George Irving	Drama	World Film
The Boss	Emile Chautard	Holbrook Blinn, Alice Brady	Drama	World Film
The Broken Law	Oscar Apfel	William Farnum, Dorothy Bernard	Drama	Fox Film
Buckshot John	Hobart Bosworth	Courtenay Foote, Herbert Standing	Western	Paramount
Business Is Business	Otis Turner	Nat C. Goodwin, Jack Nelson, Maude George	Drama	Universal
A Butterfly on the Wheel	Maurice Tourneur	Holbrook Blinn, Vivian Martin	Drama	World Film
The Buzzard's Shadow	Thomas Ricketts	Harold Lockwood, May Allison	Drama	Mutual Film
Camille	Albert Capellani	Clara Kimball Young, Paul Capellani	Drama	World Film
The Caprices of Kitty	Phillips Smalley	Elsie Janis, Courtenay Foote, Herbert Standing	Comedy	Paramount
Captain Courtesy	Phillips Smalley, Lois Weber	Dustin Farnum, Courtenay Foote, Winifred Kingston	Drama	Paramount
The Captive	Cecil B. DeMille	Blanche Sweet, House Peters	Historical	Paramount
Carmen	Cecil B. DeMille	Geraldine Farrar, Wallace Reid	Adventure	Paramount
Carmen	Raoul Walsh	Theda Bara	Adventure	Fox Film
The Carpet from Bagdad	Colin Campbell	Kathlyn Williams, Wheeler Oakman, Guy Oliver	Adventure	Selig
The Case of Becky	Frank Reicher	Blanche Sweet, Theodore Roberts, Carlyle Blackwell	Drama	Paramount
The Caveman	Theodore Marston	Robert Edeson, Charles Eldridge	Comedy	Vitagraph
The Celebrated Scandal	J. Gordon Edwards	Betty Nansen, Edward José, Stuart Holmes	Drama	Fox Film
The Chalice of Courage	Rollin S. Sturgeon	Myrtle Gonzalez, Otto Lederer	Drama	Vitagraph
The Cheat	Cecil B. DeMille	Fannie Ward, Sessue Hayakawa	Drama	Paramount
Children of the Ghetto	Frank Powell	Wilton Lackaye, Ruby Hoffman	Drama	Fox Film
Chimmie Fadden	Cecil B. DeMille	Victor Moore, Raymond Hatton	Comedy western	Paramount
Chimmie Fadden Out West	Cecil B. DeMille	Victor Moore, Raymond Hatton	Comedy, Western	Paramount
The Chorus Lady	Frank Reicher	Cleo Ridgely, Marjorie Daw	Comedy	Paramount
Christmas Memories	Robert Z. Leonard	Ella Hall, Marc B. Robbins	Drama	Universal
The Circular Staircase	Edward LeSaint	Eugenie Besserer, Guy Oliver, Stella Razeto	Mystery	Selig
The Clemenceau Case	Herbert Brenon	Theda Bara, Stuart Holmes	Drama	Fox Film
The Closing Net	Edward José	Howard Estabrook, Madlaine Traverse	Crime	Pathé Exchange
The Clue	Frank Reicher	Blanche Sweet, Sessue Hayakawa	Drama	Paramount
Cohen's Luck	John H. Collins	William Wadsworth, Viola Dana	Comedy	Edison
The College Orphan	William C. Dowlan	Carter DeHaven, Flora Parker DeHaven	Comedy	Universal
Colorado	Norval MacGregor	Hobart Bosworth, Anna Lehr	Western	Universal
The Commanding Officer	Allan Dwan	Alice Dovey, Donald Crisp, Marshall Neilan	Drama	Paramount
The Commuters	George Fitzmaurice	Irene Fenwick, Charles Judels	Comedy	Edison
Comrade John	Bertram Bracken	Ruth Roland, Lew Cody	Drama	Pathé Exchange
Conscience	Stuart Paton	William Welsh, Frances Nelson	Drama	Universal
Cora	Edwin Carewe	Emily Stevens, Frank Elliott	Drama	Metro
Coral	Henry MacRae	Marie Walcamp, Wellington A. Playter	Drama	Universal
The Country Boy	Frederick A. Thomson	Marshall Neilan, Loyola O'Connor	Comedy	Paramount
Courtmartialed	Stuart Paton	Hobart Henley, Frances Nelson	Drama	Universal
The Coward	Reginald Barker	Charles Ray, Frank Keenan, Gertrude Claire	Historical	Triangle Film
The Cowardly Way	John Ince	Florence Reed, Ferdinand Tidmarsh	Drama	World Film
The Cowboy and the Lady	Edwin Carewe	Gertrude Short, Helen Case	Western	Metro
The Crimson Wing	E.H. Calvert	Ruth Stonehouse, Beverly Bayne	War	Essanay
Crooky	C.J. Williams	Anna Laughlin, Harry T. Morey	Comedy	Vitagraph
Cross Currents	Francis J. Grandon	Helen Ware, Courtenay Foote	Drama	Triangle Film
The Crown Prince's Double	Van Dyke Brooke	Maurice Costello, Norma Talmadge	Drama	Vitagraph
The Cub	Maurice Tourneur	Johnny Hines, Martha Hedman	Comedy	World Film
The Cup of Life	Thomas H. Ince	Bessie Barriscale, Enid Markey, Charles Ray	Drama	Mutual Film
The Dancing Girl	Allan Dwan	Florence Reed, Fuller Mellish	Drama	Paramount
The Darkening Trail	William S. Hart	William S. Hart, Enid Markey	Drama	Mutual Film
A Daughter of the City	E.H. Calvert	Marguerite Clayton, E.H. Calvert	Drama	Essanay
David Harum	Allan Dwan	William H. Crane, May Allison	Romantic comedy	Paramount
The Dawn of a Tomorrow	James Kirkwood Sr.	Mary Pickford, David Powell	Drama	Paramount
The Deep Purple	James Young	Clara Kimball Young, Milton Sills	Drama	World Film
The Despoiler	Reginald Barker	Frank Keenan, Enid Markey, Charles K. French	War	Triangle Film
Destiny	Edwin Carewe	Emily Stevens, Fred Stone	Drama	Metro
The Destroying Angel	Richard Ridgely	Mabel Trunnelle, Marc McDermott	Drama	Edison
Destruction	Will S. Davis	Theda Bara, Warner Oland	Drama	Fox Film
The Devil's Daughter	Frank Powell	Theda Bara, Jane Lee	Drama	Fox Film
The Dictator	Edwin S. Porter	John Barrymore, Ruby Hoffman	Comedy	Paramount
The Disciple	William S. Hart	William S. Hart, Dorothy Dalton	Western	Triangle Film
Don Quixote	Edward Dillon	DeWolf Hopper Sr., Fay Tincher	Drama	Triangle Film
Double Trouble	Christy Cabanne	Douglas Fairbanks, Margery Wilson	Comedy	Triangle Film
Dr. Rameau	Will S. Davis	Stuart Holmes, Dorothy Bernard	Drama	Fox Film
The Dust of Egypt	George D. Baker	Antonio Moreno, Edith Storey	Comedy	Vitagraph
The Earl of Pawtucket	Harry Myers	Lawrence D'Orsay, Rosemary Theby	Comedy	Universal
The Edge of the Abyss	Walter Edwards	Mary Boland, Robert McKim	Drama	Triangle Film
Emmy of Stork's Nest	William Nigh	Mary Miles Minter, Niles Welch	Drama	Metro
An Enemy to Society	Edgar Jones	Lois Meredith, Henry Bergman	Drama	Metro
Enoch Arden	Christy Cabanne	Alfred Paget, Lillian Gish	Drama	Mutual Film
The Eternal City	Edwin S. Porter, Hugh Ford	Pauline Frederick, Thomas Holding	Drama	Paramount
The Explorer	George Melford	Lou Tellegen, Tom Forman, Dorothy Davenport	Adventure	Paramount
An Eye for an Eye	William Desmond Taylor	Neva Gerber, William Desmond Taylor	Drama	Pathé Exchange
The Face in the Moonlight	Albert Capellani	Robert Warwick, Montagu Love	Drama	World Film
The Fairy and the Waif	George Irving	Mary Miles Minter, Percy Helton	Drama	World Film
The Family Cupboard	Frank Hall Crane	Holbrook Blinn, Frances Nelson	Drama	World Film
The Family Stain	Will S. Davis	Mayme Kelso, Walter Miller	Mystery	Fox Film
Fanchon, the Cricket	James Kirkwood	Mary Pickford, Jack Standing, Lottie Pickford	Drama	Paramount
The Fatal Card	James Kirkwood	John B. Mason, Hazel Dawn	Drama	Paramount
Father and the Boys	Joseph De Grasse	Digby Bell, Louise Lovely, Lon Chaney	Comedy	Universal
Fatherhood	Hobart Bosworth	Hobart Bosworth, Jack Hoxie	Western	Universal
Fighting Bob	John W. Noble	Orrin Johnson, Olive Wyndham	Drama	Metro
The Fighting Hope	George Melford	George Gebhardt, Laura Hope Crews	Drama	Paramount
The Final Judgment	Edwin Carewe	Ethel Barrymore, Mahlon Hamilton	Drama	Metro
The Flaming Sword	Edwin Middleton	Lionel Barrymore, Jane Grey	Drama	Metro
The Flash of an Emerald	Albert Capellani	Robert Warwick, Julia Stuart	Drama	World Film
A Fool There Was	Frank Powell	Theda Bara, Edward Jose	Drama	Fox Film
The Foundling	Alan Dwan	Mary Pickford, Edward Martindel	Drama	Paramount
Four Feathers	J. Searle Dawley	Edgar L. Davenport, Fuller Mellish	Drama	Metro
The Frame-Up	Otis Turner	George Fawcett, Maude George	Drama	Universal
From the Valley of the Missing	Frank Powell	Vivian Tobin, William Bailey	Crime	Fox Film

== G–M ==
Title	Director	Cast	Genre	Studio
The Galley Slave	J. Gordon Edwards	Theda Bara, Stuart Holmes	Drama	Fox Film
Gambier's Advocate	James Kirkwood Sr.	Hazel Dawn, Fuller Mellish	Drama	Paramount
Garden of Lies	Jack Pratt	Jane Cowl, William Russell	Drama	Universal
The Gentleman from Indiana	Frank Lloyd	Dustin Farnum, Winifred Kingston, Herbert Standing	Drama	Paramount
A Gentleman of Leisure	George Melford	Wallace Eddinger, Sydney Deane	Comedy	Paramount
Ghosts	George Nichols	Henry B. Walthall, Mary Alden	Drama	Mutual Film
A Gilded Fool	Edgar Lewis	William Farnum, Harry Spingler	Comedy	Fox Film
The Girl from His Town	Harry A. Pollard	Margarita Fischer, Beatrice Van	Drama	Mutual Film
The Girl I Left Behind Me	Lloyd B. Carleton	Robert Edeson, Stuart Holmes	Western	Fox Film
The Girl of the Golden West	Cecil B. DeMille	Mabel Van Buren, Theodore Roberts, Anita King	Western	Paramount
A Girl of Yesterday	Allan Dwan	Mary Pickford, Jack Pickford	Comedy	Paramount
Gladiola	John H. Collins	Viola Dana, Charles Sutton	Drama	Edison
The Goddess	Ralph Ince	Anita Stewart, Earle Williams	Drama	Vitagraph
The Golden Chance	Cecil B. DeMille	Cleo Ridgely, Wallace Reid	Drama	Paramount
The Golden Claw	Reginald Barker	Bessie Barriscale, Wedgwood Nowell	Drama	Triangle Film
The Goose Girl	Frederick A. Thomson	Marguerite Clark, Monroe Salisbury	Drama	Paramount
The Governor	Edgar Lewis	William Farnum, Claire Whitney	Drama	Fox Film
The Governor's Lady	George Melford	May Allison, Theodore Roberts	Drama	Paramount
Graustark	Fred E. Wright	Francis X. Bushman, Beverly Bayne, Edna Mayo	Adventure	Essanay
The Gray Mask	Frank Hall Crane	Edwin Arden, Barbara Tennant	Crime	World Film
The Great Divide	Edgar Lewis	Ethel Clayton, House Peters	Western	Lubin
Greater Love Hath No Man	Herbert Blaché	Crauford Kent, Mabel Wright	Drama	Metro
The Greater Will	Harley Knoles	Cyril Maude, Lois Meredith, Montagu Love	Drama	Pathé Exchange
Gretna Green	Thomas N. Heffron	Marguerite Clark, Arthur Hoops	Romantic comedy	Paramount
The Heart of Jennifer	James Kirkwood Sr.	Hazel Dawn, James Kirkwood Sr.	Drama	Paramount
The Heart of Lincoln	Francis Ford	William Quinn, Grace Cunard	Historical	Universal
The Heart of Maryland	Herbert Brenon	Caroline Louise Dudley, J. Farrell MacDonald	Drama	Metro
The Heart of a Painted Woman	Alice Guy	Olga Petrova, Mahlon Hamilton	Drama	Metro
The Heart of the Blue Ridge	James Young	Clara Kimball Young, Chester Barnett	Drama	World Film
Hearts and the Highway	Wilfrid North	Lillian Walker, Charles Kent	Historical	Vitagraph
Hearts in Exile	James Young	Clara Kimball Young, Montagu Love	Drama	World Film
The Heights of Hazard	Harry Lambart	Eleanor Woodruff, Charles Richman, Charles Kent	Drama	Vitagraph
Helene of the North	J. Searle Dawley	Marguerite Clark, Elliott Dexter, Conway Tearle	Drama	Paramount
Help Wanted	Hobart Bosworth	Lillian Elliott, Adele Farrington	Drama	Paramount
Her Great Match	René Plaissetty	Gail Kane, Vernon Steele	Drama	Metro
Her Mother's Secret	Frederick A. Thomson	Ralph Kellard, Dorothy Green	Drama	Fox Film
Her Own Way	Herbert Blaché	Florence Reed, Clarissa Selwynne	Drama	Metro
Heritage	Robert Z. Leonard	Ella Hall, Allan Forrest, Anna Lehr	Drama	Universal
The High Road	John W. Noble	Valli Valli, Frank Elliott	Drama	Metro
His Wife	George Foster Platt	Holmes Herbert, Theodore von Eltz	Drama	World Film
The House of Fear	Ashley Miller	Sheldon Lewis, Jeanne Eagels	Mystery	Pathé Exchange
The House of Tears	Edwin Carewe	Emily Stevens, Madge Tyrone	Drama	Metro
The House of a Thousand Candles	Thomas N. Heffron	Harry Mestayer, Grace Darmond	Mystery	Selig
The House of a Thousand Scandals	Tom Ricketts	Harold Lockwood, May Allison	Drama	Mutual Film
The House of the Lost Court	Charles Brabin	Duncan McRae, Viola Dana	Drama	Paramount
Hypocrites	Lois Weber	Courtenay Foote, Myrtle Stedman, Herbert Standing	Drama	Paramount
I'm Glad My Boy Grew Up to Be a Soldier	Frank Beal	Harry Mestayer, Eugenie Besserer	Drama	Selig
The Immigrant	George Melford	Valeska Suratt, Thomas Meighan	Drama	Paramount
The Impostor	Albert Capellani	Alec B. Francis, Edward Kimball	Drama	World Film
In the Palace of the King	Fred E. Wright	Richard Travers, Arline Hackett	Drama	Essanay
Infatuation	Harry A. Pollard	Margarita Fischer, Joseph Singleton	Drama	Mutual Film
Inspiration	George Foster Platt	Audrey Munson, Thomas A. Curran	Drama	Mutual Film
The Iron Strain	Reginald Barker	Dustin Farnum, Enid Markey	Action	Triangle Film
The Island of Regeneration	Harry Davenport	Edith Storey, Antonio Moreno	Drana	Vitagraph
The Italian	Reginald Barker	George Beban, Clara Williams	Drama	Paramount
It's No Laughing Matter	Lois Weber	Macklyn Arbuckle, Myrtle Stedman	Comedy	Paramount
The Ivory Snuff Box	Maurice Tourneur	Holbrook Blinn, Norman Trevor	Mystery	World Film
Jane	Frank Lloyd	Charlotte Greenwood, Myrtle Stedman, Forrest Stanley	Comedy	Paramount
Jewel	Phillips Smalley, Lois Weber	Ella Hall, Rupert Julian	Drama	Universal
Jim the Penman	Edwin S. Porter	John B. Mason, Harold Lockwood	Crime	Paramount
John Glayde's Honor	George Irving	C. Aubrey Smith, Mary Lawton	Drama	Pathé Exchange
Jordan Is a Hard Road	Allan Dwan	Dorothy Gish, Frank Campeau,	Drama	Triangle Film
Judge Not	Robert Z. Leonard	Julia Dean, Harry Carter	Drama	Universal
Judy Forgot	T. Hayes Hunter	Marie Cahill, Sam Hardy	Comedy	Universal
The Juggernaut	Ralph Ince	Anita Stewart, Earle Williams	Drama	Vitagraph
Just Jim	O.A.C. Lund	Harry Carey, Duke Worne	Drama	Universal
Kilmeny	Oscar Apfel	Lenore Ulric, William Desmond, Herbert Standing	Drama	Paramount
Kindling	Cecil B. DeMille	Charlotte Walker, Thomas Meighan, Raymond Hatton	Drama	Paramount
The Kreutzer Sonata	Herbert Brenon	Nance O'Neil, Theda Bara	Drama	Fox Film
Lady Audley's Secret	Marshall Farnum	Theda Bara, Riley Hatch	Drama	Fox Film
The Lamb	Christy Cabanne	Douglas Fairbanks Sr., Seena Owen	Western	Triangle Film
The Lily and the Rose	Paul Powell	Lillian Gish, Wilfred Lucas	Drama	Triangle Film
A Little Brother of the Rich	Otis Turner	Hobart Bosworth, Jane Novak	Drama	Universal
The Little Dutch Girl	Emile Chautard	Vivian Martin, Chester Barnett	Drama	World Film
The Little Gypsy	Oscar Apfel	Dorothy Bernard, Thurlow Bergen	Drama	Fox Film
Little Pal	James Kirkwood Sr.	Mary Pickford, Russell Bassett	Drama	Paramount
The Long Chance	Edward LeSaint	Frank Keenan, Stella Razeto	Western	Universal
Lord John in New York	Edward LeSaint	William Garwood, Stella Razetto	Mystery	Universal
The Love Route	Allan Dwan	Harold Lockwood, Winifred Kingston, Donald Crisp	Western	Paramount
The Luring Lights	Robert G. Vignola	Stella Hoban, Helen Lindroth	Drama	Kalem
Lydia Gilmore	Hugh Ford, Edwin S. Porter	Pauline Frederick, Vincent Serrano, Thomas Holding	Drama	Paramount
Madame Butterfly	Sidney Olcott	Mary Pickford, Marshall Neilan	Drama	Paramount
The Majesty of the Law	Julia Crawford Ivers	George Fawcett, Jane Wolfe	Drama	Paramount
The Making Over of Geoffrey Manning	Harry Davenport	Harry T. Morey, Eulalie Jensen	Drama	Vitagraph
The Man Trail	E.H. Calvert	Richard Travers, Ernest Maupain	Drama	Essanay
The Man of Shame	Harry Myers	Wilton Lackaye, Rosemary Theby	Drama	Universal
The Man Who Couldn't Beat God	Maurice Costello, Robert Gaillard	Naomi Childers, Charles Eldridge	Drama	Vitagraph
The Man Who Found Himself	Frank Hall Crane	Robert Warwick, Arline Pretty	Crime	World Film
The Marble Heart	George Lessey	King Baggot, Jane Fearnley	Drama	Universal
The Marriage of Kitty	George Melford	Fannie Ward, Cleo Ridgely	Comedy	Paramount
Marrying Money	James Young	Clara Kimball Young, Chester Barnett	Comedy	World Film
Marse Covington	Edwin Carewe	Edward Connelly, Louise Huff	Drama	Metro
Martyrs of the Alamo	Christy Cabanne	Sam De Grasse, Walter Long	Historical	Triangle Film
The Masqueraders	James Kirkwood, Sr.	Hazel Dawn, Elliott Dexter	Drama	Paramount
The Master Hand	Harley Knoles	Nat C. Goodwin, Clarissa Selwynne	Drama	World Film
The Mating	Raymond B. West	Bessie Barriscale, Lew Cody	Drama	Mutual Film
May Blossom	Allan Dwan	Russell Bassett, Donald Crisp, Marshall Neilan	Drama	Paramount
Mignon	William Nigh	Beatriz Michelena, House Peters	Drama	World Film
Mistress Nell	James Kirkwood Sr.	Mary Pickford, Owen Moore	Historical	Paramount
The Money Master	George Fitzmaurice	Frank Sheridan, Calvin Thomas	Drama	Edison
The Moonstone	Frank Hall Crane	Eugene O'Brien, Elaine Hammerstein	Mystery	World Film
The Morals of Marcus	Edwin S. Porter, Hugh Ford	Marie Doro, Ida Darling, Julian L'Estrange	Comedy	Paramount
Mortmain	Theodore Marston	Robert Edeson, Muriel Ostriche	Thriller	Vitagraph
The Moth and the Flame	Sidney Olcott	Bradley Barker, Arthur Donaldson	Drama	Paramount
Mother's Roses	Theodore Marston	Mary Maurice, James Morrison	Drama	Vitagraph
Mr. Grex of Monte Carlo	Frank Reicher	Theodore Roberts, Dorothy Davenport, Carlyle Blackwell	Drama	Paramount
Mrs. Plum's Pudding	Al Christie	Marie Tempest, W. Graham Brown	Western comedy	Universal
The Mummy and the Humming Bird	James Durkin	Charles Cherry, Arthur Hoops	Drama	Paramount
My Madonna	Alice Guy	Olga Petrova, Albert Howson	Drama	Metro
The Mystery of Room 13	George Ridgwell	Marc McDermott, Carlton S. King	Mystery	Edison

== N–Z ==
Title	Director	Cast	Genre	Studio
Nearly a Lady	Hobart Bosworth	Elsie Janis, Owen Moore	Comedy	Paramount
Niobe	Hugh Ford, Edwin S. Porter	Hazel Dawn, Reginald Denny	Comedy	Paramount
Old Heidelberg	John Emerson	Wallace Reid, Dorothy Gish, Erich von Stroheim	Romance	Triangle Film
The Old Homestead	James Kirkwood, Sr.	Frank Losee, Creighton Hale, Louise Huff	Comedy	Paramount
On Dangerous Paths	John H. Collins	Viola Dana, Pat O'Malley	Drama	Edison
On Her Wedding Night	George D. Baker	Edith Storey, Antonio Moreno, Charles Kent	Mystery	Vitagraph
On the Night Stage	Reginald Barker	William S. Hart, Rhea Mitchell	Western	Mutual Film
One Million Dollars	John W. Noble	William Faversham, George Le Guere	Mystery	Metro
Out of the Darkness	George Melford	Charlotte Walker, Thomas Meighan, Marjorie Daw	Drama	Paramount
The Outlaw's Revenge	Christy Cabanne	Raoul Walsh, Irene Hunt	Drama	Mutual Film
Over Night	James Young	Vivian Martin, Sam Hardy	Comedy	World Film
The Patriot and the Spy	Jack Harvey	James Cruze, Marguerite Snow	Drama	Mutual Film
Peer Gynt	Oscar Apfel, Raoul Walsh	Cyril Maude, Myrtle Stedman	Fantasy	Paramount
The Penitentes	Jack Conway	Seena Owen, Paul Gilmore	Drama	Triangle Film
Pennington's Choice	William Bowman	Francis X. Bushman, Beverly Bayne	Drama	Metro
The Picture of Dorian Gray	Eugene Moore	Harris Gordon	Horror	
The Pitfall	James W. Horne	Marin Sais, Frank Jonasson	Drama	Kalem
Playing Dead	Sidney Drew	Sidney Drew, Donald Hall	Drama	Vitagraph
The Plunderer	Edgar Lewis	William Farnum, Claire Whitney	Action	Fox Film
Poor Schmaltz	Hugh Ford	Sam Bernard, Conway Tearle	Comedy	Paramount
The Pretenders	Robert G. Vignola	Crauford Kent, Marguerite Courtot	Comedy	Kalem
Pretty Mrs. Smith	Hobart Bosworth	Fritzi Scheff, Owen Moore, Forrest Stanley	Comedy	Paramount
The Pretty Sister of Jose	Allan Dwan	Marguerite Clark, Jack Pickford	Romance	Paramount
A Price for Folly	George D. Baker	Edith Storey, Antonio Moreno	Drama	Vitagraph
The Primrose Path	Lawrence Marston	Hal Forde, Gladys Hanson	Drama	Universal
The Prince and the Pauper	Edwin S. Porter, Hugh Ford	Marguerite Clark, Robert Broderick	Adventure	Paramount
Princess Romanoff	Frank Powell	Nance O'Neil, Stuart Holmes	Drama	Fox Film
The Puppet Crown	George Melford	Ina Claire, Carlyle Blackwell	Drama	Paramount
The Rack	Emile Chautard	Alice Brady, Milton Sills	Drama	World Film
Rags	James Kirkwood Sr.	Mary Pickford, Marshall Neilan	Drama	Paramount
The Raven	Charles Brabin	Henry Walthall, Harry Dunkinson	Biography	Essanay
The Reform Candidate	Frank LLoyd	Macklyn Arbuckle, Forrest Stanley, Myrtle Stedman	Drama	Paramount
Regeneration	Raoul Walsh	Rockliffe Fellowes, Anna Q. Nilsson	Crime drama	Fox Film
The Rosary	Colin Campbell	Kathlyn Williams, Wheeler Oakman	Drama	Selig
A Royal Family	William Nigh	Fuller Mellish, Montagu Love	Drama	Metro
The Rug Maker's Daughter	Oscar Apfel	Maud Allan, Forrest Stanley, Jane Darwell	Adventure	Paramount
The Running Fight	James Durkin	Violet Heming, Thurlow Bergen	Drama	Paramount
The Sable Lorcha	Lloyd Ingraham	Tully Marshall, Thomas Jefferson	Thriller	Triangle
Salvation Nell	George E. Middleton	Beatriz Michelena, William Pike	Drama	World Film
Samson	Edgar Lewis	William Farnum, Edgar L. Davenport	Drama	Fox Film
Satan Sanderson	John W. Noble	Orrin Johnson, Irene Warfield	Drama	Metro
Saved from the Harem	Wilbert Melville	Violet MacMillan, Lee Shumway	Adventure	Lubin
Scandal	Phillips Smalley, Lois Weber	Rupert Julian, Adele Farrington	Drama	Universal
The Scarlet Sin	Otis Turner	Hobart Bosworth, Jane Novak	Drama	Universal
Sealed Lips	John Ince	Arthur Ashley, Mary Charleson	Drama	World Film
Sealed Valley	Lawrence B. McGill	Dorothy Donnelly, J. W. Johnson	Western	Metro
The Second in Command	William J. Bowman	Francis X. Bushman, Marguerite Snow	Drama	Metro
The Secret Orchard	Frank Reicher	Cleo Ridgely, Blanche Sweet, Carlyle Blackwell	Drama	Paramount
The Secret Sin	Frank Reicher	Blanche Sweet, Thomas Meighan, Sessue Hayakawa	Drama	Paramount
The Secretary of Frivolous Affairs	Tom Ricketts	May Allison, Harold Lockwood	Romance	Mutual Film
The Seven Sisters	Sidney Olcott	Madge Evans, Marguerite Clark, Conway Tearle	Romance	Paramount
The Shooting of Dan McGrew	Herbert Blaché	Edmund Breese, Kathryn Adams	Drama	Metro
Should a Mother Tell	J. Gordon Edwards	Betty Nansen, Stuart Holmes	Drama	Fox Film
Should a Wife Forgive?	Henry King	Lillian Lorraine, Henry King	Drama	World Film
The Silent Command	Robert Z. Leonard	Ella Hall, Allan Forrest	Mystery	Universal
The Silent Voice	William J. Bowman	Francis X. Bushman, Marguerite Snow, Helen Dunbar	Drama	Metro
Simon, the Jester	Edward José	Edwin Arden, Irene Warfield, Crauford Kent	Drama	Pathé Exchange
Sin	Herbert Brenon	Theda Bara, Warner Oland	Drama	Fox Film
The Slim Princess	E. H. Calvert	Francis X. Bushman, Ruth Stonehouse, Wallace Beery	Comedy	Essanay
Snobs	Oscar Apfel	Victor Moore, Anita King, Ernest Joy	Comedy	Paramount
Sold	Edwin S. Porter, Hugh Ford,	Pauline Frederick, Thomas Holding	Drama	Paramount
A Soldier's Oath	Oscar Apfel	William Farnum, Dorothy Bernard	Drama	Fox Film
The Song of Hate	J. Gordon Edwards	Betty Nansen, Dorothy Bernard	Drama	Fox Film
The Song of the Wage Slave	Herbert Blaché, Alice Guy	Edmund Breese, Fraunie Fraunholz	Drama	Metro
The Soul of Broadway	Herbert Brenon	Valeska Suratt, Jane Lee	Drama	Fox Film
Still Waters	J. Searle Dawley	Marguerite Clark, Robert Broderick	Comedy	Paramount
Stolen Goods	George Melford	Blanche Sweet, Cleo Ridgely, House Peters	Drama	Paramount
The Suburban	George Lessey	King Baggot, Iva Shepard	Drama	Universal
Sunday	George W. Lederer	Montagu Love, Charles Trowbridge	Drama	World Film
The Supreme Test	Edward LeSaint	Henrietta Crosman, Wyndham Standing, Stella Razeto	Drama	Universal
Sweet Alyssum	Colin Campbell	Tyrone Power Sr., Kathlyn Williams	Drama	Selig
Tainted Money	Ulysses Davis	Hobart Bosworth, Jane Novak	Drama	Universal
Temptation	Cecil B. DeMille	Geraldine Farrar, Theodore Roberts	Drama	Paramount
A Texas Steer	Giles Warren	Tyrone Power Sr., Grace Darmond	Comedy	Selig
The Toast of Death	Thomas H. Ince	Louise Glaum, Harry Keenan	Drama	Mutual Film
Trilby	Maurice Tourneur	Wilton Lackaye, Clara Kimball Young	Drama	World Film
The Turn of the Road	Tefft Johnson	Joseph Kilgour, Naomi Childers	Drama	Vitagraph
The Two Orphans	Herbert Brenon	Theda Bara, Saba Raleigh	Drama	Fox Film
The Unafraid	Cecil B. DeMille	Rita Jolivet, House Peters	Drama	Paramount
Under Southern Skies	Lucius Henderson	Mary Fuller, Charles Stanton Ogle	Drama	Universal
The Unfaithful Wife	J. Gordon Edwards	Genevieve Hamper, Stuart Holmes	Drama	Fox Film
The Unknown	George Melford	Lou Tellegen, Theodore Roberts, Dorothy Davenport	Drama	Paramount
Up from the Depths	Paul Powell	Gladys Brockwell, Courtenay Foote	Drama	Mutual Film
The Vampire	Alice Guy	Olga Petrova, Vernon Steele	Drama	Metro
The Vanderhoff Affair	Robert G. Vignola	Hal Forde, Marguerite Courtot	Mystery	Kalem
Vanity Fair	Charles Brabin	Shirley Mason, Minnie Maddern Fiske, William Wadsworth	Drama	Edison
Via Wireless	George Fitzmaurice	Bruce McRae, Gail Kane	Drama	Pathé Exchange
The Voice in the Fog	J. P. McGowan	Donald Brian, Adda Gleason	Mystery	Paramount
The Warrens of Virginia	Cecil B. DeMille	Blanche Sweet, James Neill	Drama	Paramount
What Happened to Father?	C.J. Williams	Frank Daniels, Anna Laughlin	Comedy	Vitagraph
The Wheels of Justice	Theodore Marston	Dorothy Kelly, James W. Morrison, Eulalie Jensen	Crime	Vitagraph
When It Strikes Home	Perry N. Vekroff	Edwin August, Muriel Ostriche	Drama	World Film
When We Were Twenty-One	Hugh Ford, Edwin S. Porter	William Elliott, Charles Waldron	Comedy	Paramount
The White Pearl	Edwin S. Porter, Hugh Ford	Marie Doro, Thomas Holding	Adventure	Paramount
The White Scar	Ulysses Davis	Hobart Bosworth, Anna Lehr	Adventure	Universal
The White Sister	Fred E. Wright	Viola Allen, Richard Travers	Drama	Essanay
The White Terror	Stuart Paton	Hobart Henley, Frances Nelson	Drama	Universal
Who Killed Joe Merrion?	Tefft Johnson	Joseph Kilgour, S. Rankin Drew	Drama	Vitagraph
The Wild Goose Chase	Cecil B. DeMille	Ina Claire, Lucien Littlefield	Comedy drama	Paramount
The Wild Olive	Oscar Apfel	Myrtle Stedman, Forrest Stanley, Edmund Lowe	Drama	Paramount
Wildfire	Edwin Middleton	Lionel Barrymore, Lillian Russell	Drama	World Film
The Winged Idol	Scott Sidney	House Peters, Clara Williams	Drama	Triangle Film
The Wolf of Debt	Jack Harvey	Violet Mersereau, William Garwood	Drama	Universal
The Woman	George Melford	Theodore Roberts, Ernest Joy, Raymond Hatton	Drama	Paramount
The Woman Pays	Edgar Jones	John Bowers, Valli Valli	Drama	Metro
A Woman's Past	Frank Powell	Alfred Hickman, Nance O'Neil	Drama	Fox Film
A Woman's Resurrection	J. Gordon Edwards	Betty Nansen, Mathilde Brundage, Stuart Holmes	Drama	Fox Film
The Wonderful Adventure	Frederick A. Thomson	William Farnum, Mary Martin	Drama	Fox Film
Wormwood	Marshall Farnum	John St. Polis, Mathilde Brundage	Drama	Fox Film
A Yankee from the West	George Siegmann	Wallace Reid, Seena Owen	Drama	Mutual Film
The Yankee Girl	Jack J. Clark	Blanche Ring, Forrest Stanley, Herbert Standing	Comedy	Paramount
A Yellow Streak	William Nigh	Lionel Barrymore, Irene Howley	Drama	Metro
Young Romance	George Melford	Edith Taliaferro, Tom Forman	Romance	Paramount
Zaza	Edwin S. Porter, Hugh Ford	Pauline Frederick, Julian L'Estrange	Drama	Paramount

== Serials ==
Title	Director	Cast	Genre	Notes
Stingaree	James W. Horne	True Boardman, Marin Sais, Frank Jonasson	Serial	

== Short films ==
Title	Director	Cast	Genre	Notes
After the Storm	B. Reeves Eason	Vivian Rich, Harry von Meter		
The Assayer of Lone Gap	B. Reeves Eason	Perry Banks, Louise Lester		
Auntie's Portrait	George D. Baker	Sidney Drew, Ethel Lee	Comedy	
The Bank	Charlie Chaplin	Charlie Chaplin, Edna Purviance	Comedy	
The Barren Gain	B. Reeves Eason	Charlotte Burton	Drama	
Beyond His Fondest Hopes	Hal Roach	Harold Lloyd	Comedy	
The Blot on the Shield	B. Reeves Eason	Dick La Reno, Vivian Rich		
The Bluffers	B. Reeves Eason	Vivian Rich, Gayne Whitman		
Bughouse Bellhops	Hal Roach	Harold Lloyd	Comedy	
A Burlesque on Carmen	Charles Chaplin	Charles Chaplin, Edna Purviance	Comedy	
By the Sea	Charlie Chaplin	Charlie Chaplin	Comedy	
The Champion	Charles Chaplin	Charles Chaplin	Comedy	
Close-Cropped Clippings	Hal Roach	Harold Lloyd	Comedy	
Competition	B. Reeves Eason	Charlotte Burton		Eason's directorial debut
Court House Crooks		Ford Sterling, Charles Arling	Comedy	Harold Lloyd has an uncredited role
The Day of Reckoning	B. Reeves Eason	Vivian Rich, David Lythgoe	Drama	
Dirty Work in a Laundry	Ford Sterling	Ford Sterling, Minta Durfee	Comedy	Rereleased in 1918 as The Desperate Scoundrel
Drawing the Line	B. Reeves Eason	Lillian Buckingham	Drama	
The Exile of Bar-K Ranch	B. Reeves Eason	Jack Richardson	Western	
Fatty's Tintype Tangle	Fatty Arbuckle	Fatty Arbuckle	Comedy	
A Foozle at the Tee Party	Hal Roach	Harold Lloyd	Comedy	
From Italy's Shores	Otis Turner	Harold Lloyd	Comedy	
Fresh from the Farm	Hal Roach	Harold Lloyd	Comedy	
A Good Business Deal	B. Reeves Eason	Jack Richardson		
Giving Them Fits	Hal Roach	Harold Lloyd	Comedy	First film to team up Lloyd with Snub Pollard and Bebe Daniels
Great While It Lasted	Hal Roach	Harold Lloyd	Comedy	
Hearts in Shadow	B. Reeves Eason	Louise Lester		
His New Job	Charlie Chaplin	Charlie Chaplin, Ben Turpin	Comedy	
The Honor of the District Attorney	B. Reeves Eason	Vivian Rich	Drama	
The Hungry Actors	Hal Roach	Harold Lloyd	Comedy	
In the Park	Charlie Chaplin	Charlie Chaplin, Leo White, Edna Purviance	Comedy	
In Trust	B. Reeves Eason	Bessie Banks, Perry Banks		
A Jitney Elopement	Charlie Chaplin	Charlie Chaplin, Edna Purviance	Comedy	
Just Nuts	Hal Roach	Harold Lloyd	Comedy	
The Little Lady Next Door	B. Reeves Eason	Perry Banks, Louise Lester		
Lonesome Luke, Social Gangster	J. Farrell MacDonald, Hal Roach	Harold Lloyd	Comedy	
Love, Loot and Crash	Mack Sennett	Charley Chase, Dora Rodgers	Comedy	
Mabel and Fatty Viewing the World's Fair at San Francisco	Mabel Normand; Roscoe Arbuckle	Mabel Normand, Fatty Arbuckle		Very early documentary film
The Man from Texas	Tom Mix	Tom Mix	Western	
A Mixup for Mazie	Hal Roach	Harold Lloyd	Comedy	
Mountain Mary	B. Reeves Eason	Louise Lester		
The Newer Way	B. Reeves Eason	Joseph Galbraith		
A Night in the Show	Charlie Chaplin	Charlie Chaplin, Edna Purviance	Comedy	
A Night Out	Charlie Chaplin	Charlie Chaplin, Ben Turpin, Edna Purviance	Comedy	
Peculiar Patients' Pranks	Hal Roach	Harold Lloyd	Comedy	Thought to be lost, but found in Australia's National Film and Sound Archive
Pete, the Pedal Polisher	Hal Roach	Harold Lloyd	Comedy	
The Poet of the Peaks	B. Reeves Eason	Louise Lester		
Pool Sharks	Edwin Middleton	W. C. Fields	Comedy	First onscreen appearance of W. C. Fields
Profit from Loss	B. Reeves Eason	Vivian Rich		
A Question of Honor	B. Reeves Eason	Jack Richardson		
Ragtime Snap Shots	Hal Roach	Harold Lloyd		
The Ring of Destiny	Cleo Madison	Cleo Madison, Hoot Gibson	Western	
Ruses, Rhymes and Roughnecks	Hal Roach	Harold Lloyd		
Shanghaied	Charlie Chaplin	Charlie Chaplin, Edna Purviance	Comedy	
She Walketh Alone	B. Reeves Eason			
The Silver Lining	B. Reeves Eason	Gayne Whitman, Vivian Rich		
A Small Town Girl	Allan Dwan	Pauline Bush, William Lloyd, Lon Chaney	Drama	
The Smuggler's Cave	B. Reeves Eason	Jack Richardson	Drama	
The Solution to the Mystery	B. Reeves Eason	Vivian Rich		
Some Baby	Hal Roach	Harold Lloyd		
The Spirit of Adventure	B. Reeves Eason	Jack Richardson		
Spit-Ball Sadie	Hal Roach	Harold Lloyd		First appearance of Lloyd's "Lonesome Luke" character
A Submarine Pirate	Charles Avery; Syd Chaplin	Syd Chaplin, Wesley Ruggles	Comedy	
The Substitute Minister	B. Reeves Eason	Vivian Rich		
Terribly Stuck Up	Hal Roach	Harold Lloyd	Comedy	
Their Social Splash	Charles Avery	Slim Summerville, Harold Lloyd	Comedy	
Tinkering with Trouble	Hal Roach	Harold Lloyd, Snub Pollard	Comedy	
To Melody a Soul Responds	B. Reeves Eason	Ashton Dearholt		
To Rent Furnished	B. Reeves Eason	Bessie Banks		
The Tramp	Charles Chaplin	Charles Chaplin	Comedy	
The Wasp	B. Reeves Eason	Vivian Rich		
Willie Runs the Park	Hal Roach	Harold Lloyd, Jane Novak	Comedy	
A Woman	Charlie Chaplin	Charlie Chaplin, Edna Purviance	Comedy	
Work	Charlie Chaplin	Charles Chaplin, Edna Purviance	Comedy	

== See also ==
- 1915 in the United States
