= Back to the Woods (1919 film) =

1918 film

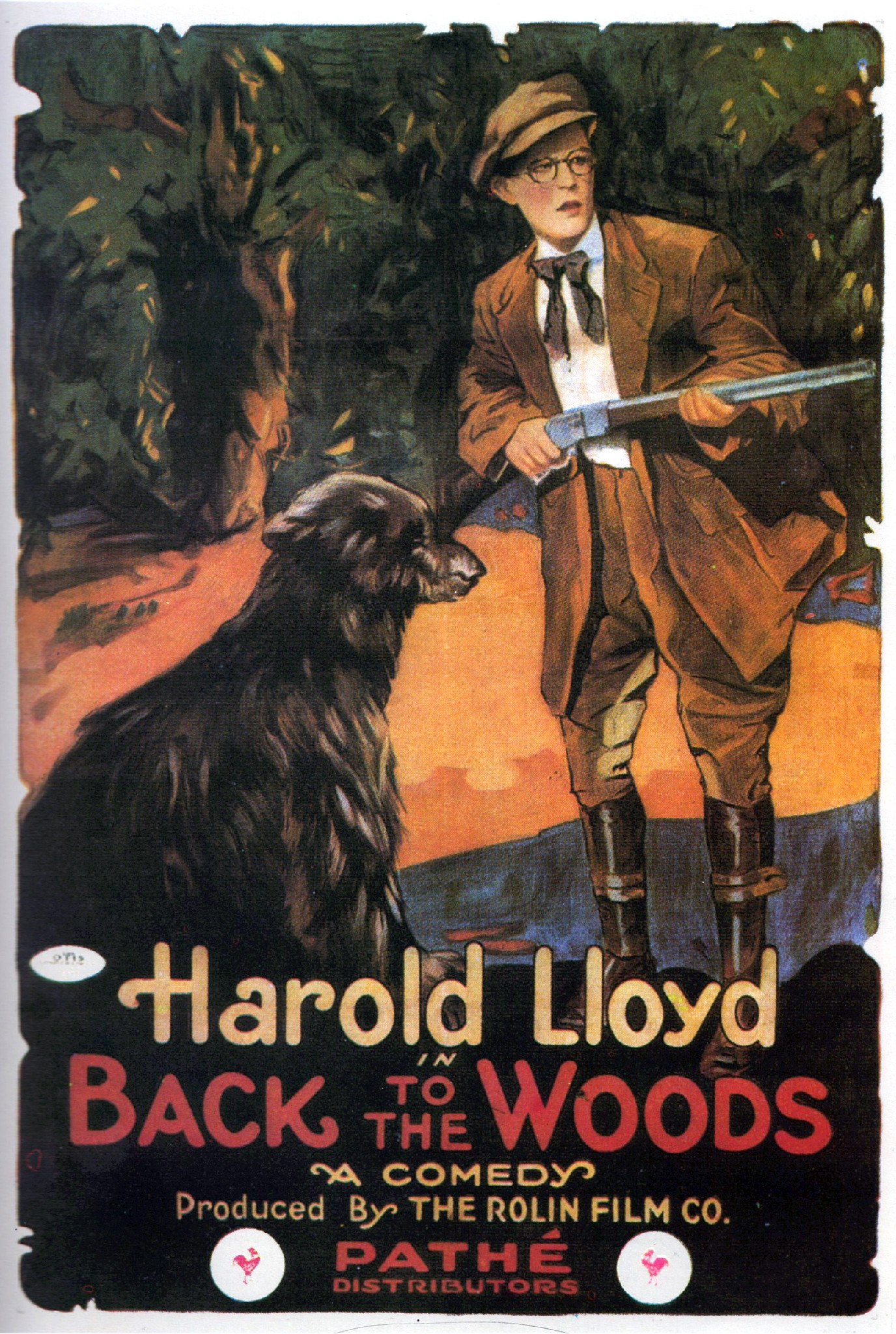
- Film poster
- Directed by: Hal Roach
- Produced by: Hal Roach
- Starring: Harold Lloyd
- Production company: Rolin Film Company
- Distributed by: Pathé Exchange
- Release date: June 1, 1919
- Running time: 10 minutes
- Country: United States
- Languages: Silent; English intertitles

Back to the Woods is a 1919 American silent comedy short film featuring Harold Lloyd. It was produced and directed by Hal Roach for the Rolin Film Company. A print of the film survives in the Archiva Nationala de Filme film archive.

== Cast ==
- Harold Lloyd as A Millionaire
- Snub Pollard as His Valet
- Bebe Daniels as Jeanne, Belle o' the Woods
- Arthur Housman
- Bud Jamison

== Plot ==
Harold and Snub are self-proclaimed big-game hunters who stop at a remote outpost. They hire two native guides to lead them into the woods, but the guides run in terror when they see a rather tame bear in the distance. Harold is annoyed that he cannot find any bears to hunt—unaware that two timid bears are closely following him. Meanwhile Snub encounters an equally tame wildcat who eats his picnic lunch. Snub sprints away. Back at the outpost, Harold twice rescues Jeanne—once from the clutches of an unwanted suitor and once from one of the bears. The grateful, gun-toting Jeanne tells Harold she wants him to be her "sweetie."

== See also ==
- Harold Lloyd filmography
