= Lonesome Luke's Lovely Rifle =

1917 film

- Written by: H. M. Walker
- Produced by: Hal Roach
- Starring: Harold Lloyd
- Release date: 1917
- Country: United States
- Languages: Silent; English intertitles

Lonesome Luke's Lovely Rifle is a 1917 American short comedy film featuring Harold Lloyd.

== Cast ==
- Harold Lloyd as Lonesome Luke
- Snub Pollard
- Bebe Daniels

== See also ==
- Harold Lloyd filmography
