= Bughouse Bellhops =

1915 film

- Directed by: Hal Roach
- Produced by: Hal Roach
- Starring: Harold Lloyd
- Release date: November 8, 1915
- Country: United States
- Languages: Silent; English intertitles

Bughouse Bellhops is a 1915 American short comedy film featuring Harold Lloyd.

== Plot summary ==
Lonesome Luke and his accessory, Moke Morpheus, are discovered in bellhop uniform, blissfully dozing on a bench in the lobby of the Bughouse Hotel. Comes a guest, and the desk clerk rings a bellhop. But, in the words of Aristotle, or Ted or someone, "you can ring and you can ring, but the house is boarded up." The clink of a few pieces of silver seems to touch some dormant chord in the boys' subconscious minds, and they immediately get on the job. Moke, after seeing the guest to his room, tries, of course, to hide the fact that a tip would be in order, and because of his modesty flies quickly from the room with the kindly aid of the roomer's leather encased pedal extremities. Luke escorts a girl guest to her room, and is starting quite a flirtation with her, when Moke, whose motto is "pass nothing up" approaches them and tells Luke that there is a tall tip awaiting him in the new guest's room. Luke goes, and the guest learns how foolish and wasteful it is to break a perfectly good water pitcher on a bellhop's head. Luke then staggers back to Moke, and sends him with neatness and dispatch through a door and into the lap of a retiring guest. With the arrival of a roughneck bouncer and his pretty wife, a fascinating free-for-all is started, in which Luke, with a fire hose, gallantly stands off the concerted attack of the whole household.

== Cast ==
- Harold Lloyd as Lonesome Luke
- Snub Pollard (as Harry Pollard)
- Gene Marsh
- Bebe Daniels

== See also ==
- List of American films of 1915
- Harold Lloyd filmography
