= Beyond His Fondest Hopes =

1915 film

- Directed by: Hal Roach
- Produced by: Hal Roach
- Starring: Harold Lloyd
- Release date: January 30, 1915
- Country: United States
- Languages: Silent; English intertitles

Beyond His Fondest Hopes is a 1915 American short comedy film featuring Harold Lloyd. It is considered a lost film.

== Cast ==
- Harold Lloyd as Harold

== See also ==
- List of American films of 1915
- Harold Lloyd filmography
