= It's a Gift (1923 film) =

1923 film

- Directed by: Hugh Fay
- Produced by: Hal Roach
- Starring: Snub Pollard
- Production company: Hal Roach Studios
- Distributed by: Pathe Exchange
- Release date: October 14, 1923
- Running time: 14 minutes
- Country: United States
- Languages: Silent; English intertitles

It's a Gift (1923) is a short silent movie comedy film featuring Snub Pollard and directed by Hugh Fay.

== Plot ==
A group of oil magnates are trying to think of new ways to attract business. One of them suggests that they contact an eccentric inventor (Pollard), who has devised a new gasoline substitute.

The inventor himself lives in a home filled with his strange inventions. When he gets the message from the oil company, he is excited about the opportunity to demonstrate his innovation, and jumps into his "magnet car".

== In popular culture ==
The most famous sequence in the film shows Pollard using a large magnet to put his car into motion. This sequence was included amongst many other old time comedy silent shorts in a montage from the Reading Rainbow episode featuring the book Ludlow Laughs.

The climax sequence in which Pollard appears from around the corner and observes the multi-car collision was used on Sesame Street toward the end of an educational film insert about traffic lights, which premiered in the first episode of the show's second season in the fall of 1970.

== Cast ==
- Snub Pollard ... Inventor Pollard
- Marie Mosquini ... The Girl
- William Gillespie ... Weller Pump, oil executive
- Wallace Howe ... Customer
- Mark Jones ... Swindler
- Eddie Dunn ... Postman (uncredited)
