= Lonesome Luke's Honeymoon =

1917 film

- Directed by: Hal Roach
- Produced by: Hal Roach
- Starring: Harold Lloyd
- Release date: May 20, 1917
- Country: United States
- Languages: Silent; English intertitles

Lonesome Luke's Honeymoon is a 1917 American short comedy film starring Harold Lloyd.

== Cast ==
- Harold Lloyd - Lonesome Luke
- Bebe Daniels
- Snub Pollard
- Arthur Mumas
- Sammy Brooks
- W.L. Adams
- Bud Jamison
- Gilbert Pratt
- Max Hamburger
- Estelle Harrison
- Florence Burns
- Margaret Strong
- Beth Darwin
- Sis Matthews
- Wilma Morris
- Dorothea Wolbert
- Charles Stevenson

== See also ==
- Harold Lloyd filmography
