= Lonesome Luke Leans to the Literary =

1916 film

- Directed by: Hal Roach
- Produced by: Hal Roach
- Starring: Harold Lloyd
- Release date: January 5, 1916
- Country: United States
- Languages: Silent film English intertitles

Lonesome Luke Leans to the Literary is a 1916 American short comedy film featuring Harold Lloyd.

== Plot ==
Lonesome Luke (Harold Lloyd) tries to sell books to a businessman and his wife.

== Cast ==
- Harold Lloyd as Lonesome Luke
- Snub Pollard (as Harry Pollard)
- Gene Marsh
- Bebe Daniels

== See also ==
- Harold Lloyd filmography
