= Luke Lugs Luggage =

1916 film by Hal Roach

- Directed by: Hal Roach
- Produced by: Hal Roach
- Starring: Harold Lloyd
- Release date: January 12, 1916
- Country: United States
- Languages: Silent; English intertitles

Luke Lugs Luggage is a 1916 American short comedy film starring Harold Lloyd.

== Cast ==
- Harold Lloyd as Lonesome Luke
- Gene Marsh
- Snub Pollard
- Bebe Daniels

== See also ==
- Harold Lloyd filmography
