= Luke's Double =

1916 film

- Directed by: Hal Roach
- Produced by: Hal Roach
- Starring: Harold Lloyd
- Release date: April 12, 1916
- Country: United States
- Language: Silent with English intertitles

Luke's Double is a 1916 American short comedy film featuring Harold Lloyd. It was believed to be a lost film. However, in October 2022, a 28-mm print of the film was recovered by the Harold Lloyd Estate and deposited at the UCLA Film & Television Archive for eventual preservation.

== Plot ==
After reading the novel Dr. Jekyll and Mr. Hyde, Luke falls asleep and experiences a chaotic nightmare in which he has a physical double. In the dream, the two Lukes navigate the town completely independent of one another. The first Luke quickly gets into a "jam" with a police officer, but his double inadvertently takes the blame for the trouble.

The confusion escalates when the second Luke offends a young woman in a local park and flees the scene. When the police are called to investigate the incident, they mistakenly cross paths with the innocent first Luke and arrest him instead. He is thrown into a jail cell, where his double appears outside the bars to mock him. Before Luke can figure out the true nature of his clone, he twists and rolls around in his bed, waking up to discover that the entire ordeal was merely a bad dream.

== Cast ==
- Harold Lloyd as Lonesome Luke
- Bebe Daniels
- Snub Pollard
- Gaylord Lloyd as Luke's Double
- Sammy Brooks
- Bud Jamison
- Charles Stevenson

== See also ==
- Harold Lloyd filmography
- List of rediscovered films
