= Luke's Washful Waiting =

1916 film by Hal Roach

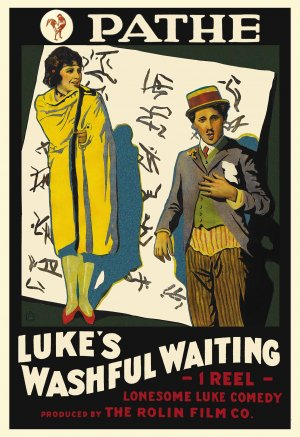
- Theatrical poster to Luke's Washful Waiting
- Directed by: Hal Roach
- Produced by: Hal Roach
- Starring: Harold Lloyd
- Release date: July 3, 1916
- Country: United States
- Languages: Silent; English intertitles

Luke's Washful Waiting is a 1916 short comedy film starring Harold Lloyd.

== Cast ==
- Harold Lloyd as Lonesome Luke
- Bebe Daniels as The Girl
- Snub Pollard (as Harry Pollard)

== See also ==
- Harold Lloyd filmography
