= Giving Them Fits =

1915 film

- Directed by: Hal Roach
- Written by: Dolly Twist
- Produced by: Hal Roach
- Starring: Harold Lloyd
- Release date: November 1, 1915
- Country: United States
- Languages: Silent; English intertitles

Giving Them Fits is a 1915 American short comedy film featuring Harold Lloyd. It was the first film to team up Lloyd with Snub Pollard and Bebe Daniels. A print of this film exists in the BFI National Archive.

== Plot ==
Luke works in a shoe store, but has difficulty focusing on work when a pretty girl is near.

== Cast ==
- Harold Lloyd - Luke de Fluke
- Snub Pollard - Luke's Co-Worker (as Harry Pollard)
- Gene Marsh - Vamp Customer
- Bebe Daniels - Co-Worker

== Reception ==
A review published in The Moving Picture World on November 13, 1915 said of the film, "a farce comedy into which a remarkable amount of vulgarity has been worked. Toward the end of the reel some very amusing slapstick stuff has been presented, and it is unfortunate that the remainder of the picture is not as free from the objectionable as this portion referred to."

== See also ==
- Harold Lloyd filmography
- List of American films of 1915
