= Luke Foils the Villain =

1916 film

- Directed by: Hal Roach
- Produced by: Hal Roach
- Starring: Harold Lloyd
- Release date: February 14, 1916
- Country: United States
- Languages: Silent film English intertitles

Luke Foils the Villain is a 1916 American short comedy film starring Harold Lloyd.

== Cast ==
- Harold Lloyd as Lonesome Luke
- Snub Pollard
- Gene Marsh
- Bebe Daniels as Maizie Nut

== See also ==
- Harold Lloyd filmography
