= A Foozle at the Tee Party =

1915 film

- Directed by: Hal Roach
- Written by: Dolly Twist
- Produced by: Hal Roach
- Starring: Harold Lloyd
- Release date: December 8, 1915
- Country: United States
- Languages: Silent; English intertitles

A Foozle at the Tee Party is a 1915 American short comedy film featuring Harold Lloyd.

== Cast ==
- Harold Lloyd as Lonesome Luke
- Snub Pollard (as Harry Pollard)
- Earl Mohan
- Gene Marsh
- Bebe Daniels
- Arthur Harrison
- Clifford Silsby

== See also ==
- List of American films of 1915
- Harold Lloyd filmography
