= Luke and the Bomb Throwers =

1916 film

- Directed by: Hal Roach
- Produced by: Hal Roach
- Starring: Harold Lloyd
- Release date: May 8, 1916
- Country: United States
- Languages: Silent film English intertitles

Luke and the Bomb Throwers is a 1916 American short comedy film starring Harold Lloyd.

== Cast ==
- Harold Lloyd - Lonesome Luke
- Snub Pollard
- Bebe Daniels
- Billy Fay - Fat Terrorist (uncredited)

== See also ==
- Harold Lloyd filmography
