= Lonesome Luke Lolls in Luxury =

1916 film

- Directed by: Hal Roach
- Produced by: Hal Roach
- Starring: Harold Lloyd
- Release date: January 19, 1916
- Country: United States
- Languages: Silent film English intertitles

Lonesome Luke Lolls in Luxury is a 1916 American short comedy film featuring Harold Lloyd. It was a silent film.

== Cast ==
- Harold Lloyd - Lonesome Luke
- Gene Marsh
- Snub Pollard
- Bebe Daniels

== See also ==
- Harold Lloyd filmography
