= Lonesome Luke, Circus King =

1916 short film

- Directed by: Hal Roach
- Produced by: Hal Roach
- Starring: Harold Lloyd
- Release date: March 29, 1916
- Country: United States
- Languages: Silent film English intertitles

Lonesome Luke, Circus King is a 1916 American short comedy film featuring Harold Lloyd. It is considered a lost film.

== Cast ==
- Harold Lloyd as Lonesome Luke
- Snub Pollard
- Bebe Daniels
- Gene Marsh

== Reception ==
In an April 15, 1916 review, Moving Picture World wrote that the film was "an entertaining number for those who like slapstick comedy."

== See also ==
- Harold Lloyd filmography
