= Them Was the Happy Days! =

1916 film

- Directed by: Hal Roach
- Produced by: Hal Roach
- Starring: Harold Lloyd
- Release date: April 26, 1916
- Country: United States
- Languages: Silent; English intertitles

Them Was the Happy Days! is a 1916 American short comedy film featuring Harold Lloyd. It is considered a lost film.

== Cast ==
- Harold Lloyd - Lonesome Luke
- Snub Pollard
- Bebe Daniels
- Dee Lampton

== See also ==
- Harold Lloyd filmography
