= Fresh from the Farm =

1915 film

- Directed by: Hal Roach
- Produced by: Hal Roach
- Starring: Harold Lloyd
- Release date: October 4, 1915
- Country: United States
- Languages: Silent; English intertitles

Fresh from the Farm is a 1915 American short comedy film starring Harold Lloyd.

== Plot ==
A farm youth goes to college, pursues the pretty female students and joins a fraternity.

== Cast ==
- Harold Lloyd as Lonesome Luke
- Gene Marsh
- Elsie Greeson
- Jack Spinks
- Arthur Harrison

== See also ==
- Harold Lloyd filmography
- List of films of 1915
