= Great While It Lasted =

1915 film

- Directed by: Hal Roach
- Produced by: Hal Roach
- Starring: Harold Lloyd
- Release date: November 22, 1915
- Country: United States
- Language: Silent with English intertitles

Great While It Lasted is a 1915 American short comedy film featuring Harold Lloyd. It is considered a lost film.

== Cast ==
- Harold Lloyd as Lonesome Luke
- Gene Marsh
- Clyde Cook
- Clifford Silsby
- Snub Pollard
- Bebe Daniels
- Arthur Harrison

== See also ==
- Harold Lloyd filmography
