= Ruses, Rhymes and Roughnecks =

1915 film

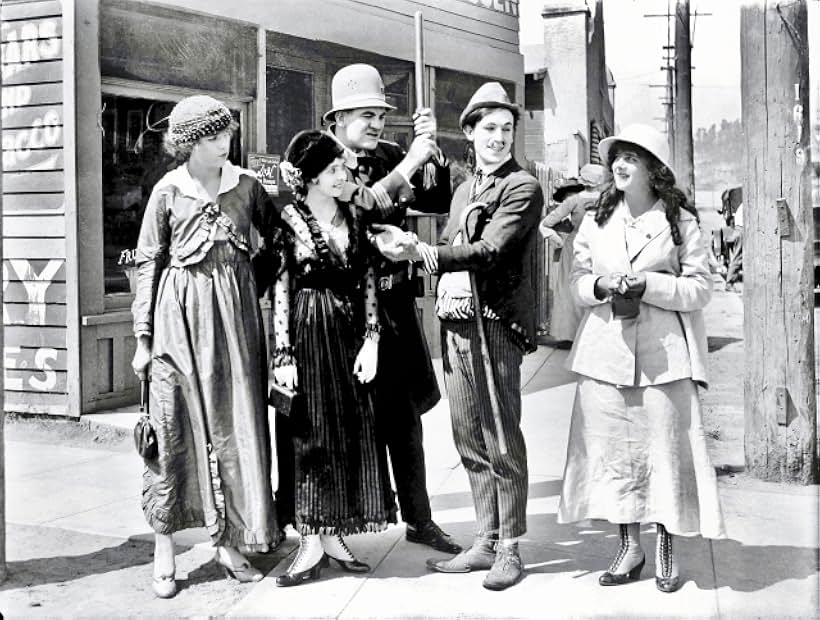
- Directed by: Hal Roach
- Produced by: Hal Roach
- Starring: Harold Lloyd
- Release date: December 15, 1915
- Country: United States
- Languages: Silent; English intertitles

Ruses, Rhymes and Roughnecks is a 1915 American short comedy film featuring Harold Lloyd. It is considered a lost film.

== Cast ==
- Harold Lloyd as Lonesome Luke
- Snub Pollard (as Harry Pollard)
- Gene Marsh
- Bebe Daniels
- Jack Spinks

== See also ==
- Harold Lloyd filmography
