= Peculiar Patients' Pranks =

1915 film

- Directed by: Hal Roach
- Written by: Dolly Twist
- Produced by: Hal Roach
- Starring: Harold Lloyd
- Release date: December 22, 1915
- Country: United States
- Languages: Silent; English intertitles

Peculiar Patients' Pranks is a 1915 American short comedy film featuring Harold Lloyd. Thought to be a lost film, until it was rediscovered in Australia's National Film and Sound Archive in 1994.

== Plot ==
Luke and his friend get into an argument on the street, and the friend is accidentally struck by a car driven by a beautiful young woman. Seeing that his injured friend is being transported to the hospital comfortably resting on the woman's lap, Luke becomes envious of his good fortune. Desiring to receive the exact same care and attention, he intentionally throws himself under another car and is rushed to the same medical facility in an ambulance.

At the hospital, Luke is placed in a general ward right next to his friend's luxurious private room. Realizing that his plan to secure exclusive attention has failed, he flies into a rage and begins playing pranks and terrorizing the other patients in the ward. Angered and exhausted by Luke's antics, the doctors decide to teach him a lesson—they forcefully take him to the operating room and perform a fake emergency surgery for an illness he does not even have. Upon waking up and discovering the trick, Luke goes completely wild, unleashing a wave of destruction throughout the hospital and attacking the medical staff.

== Cast ==
- Harold Lloyd as Lonesome Luke
- Snub Pollard as Luke's Friend (credited as Harry Pollard)
- Gene Marsh as Nurse
- Bebe Daniels as The Girl

== See also ==
- Harold Lloyd filmography
- List of rediscovered films
