= Terribly Stuck Up =

1915 film

- Directed by: Hal Roach
- Produced by: Hal Roach
- Starring: Harold Lloyd
- Release date: August 28, 1915
- Country: United States
- Languages: Silent; English intertitles

Terribly Stuck Up is a 1915 American short comedy film featuring Harold Lloyd.

== Cast ==
- Harold Lloyd - Lonesome Luke
- Gene Marsh
- Jack Spinks

== See also ==
- Harold Lloyd filmography
