= Harold Lloyd filmography =

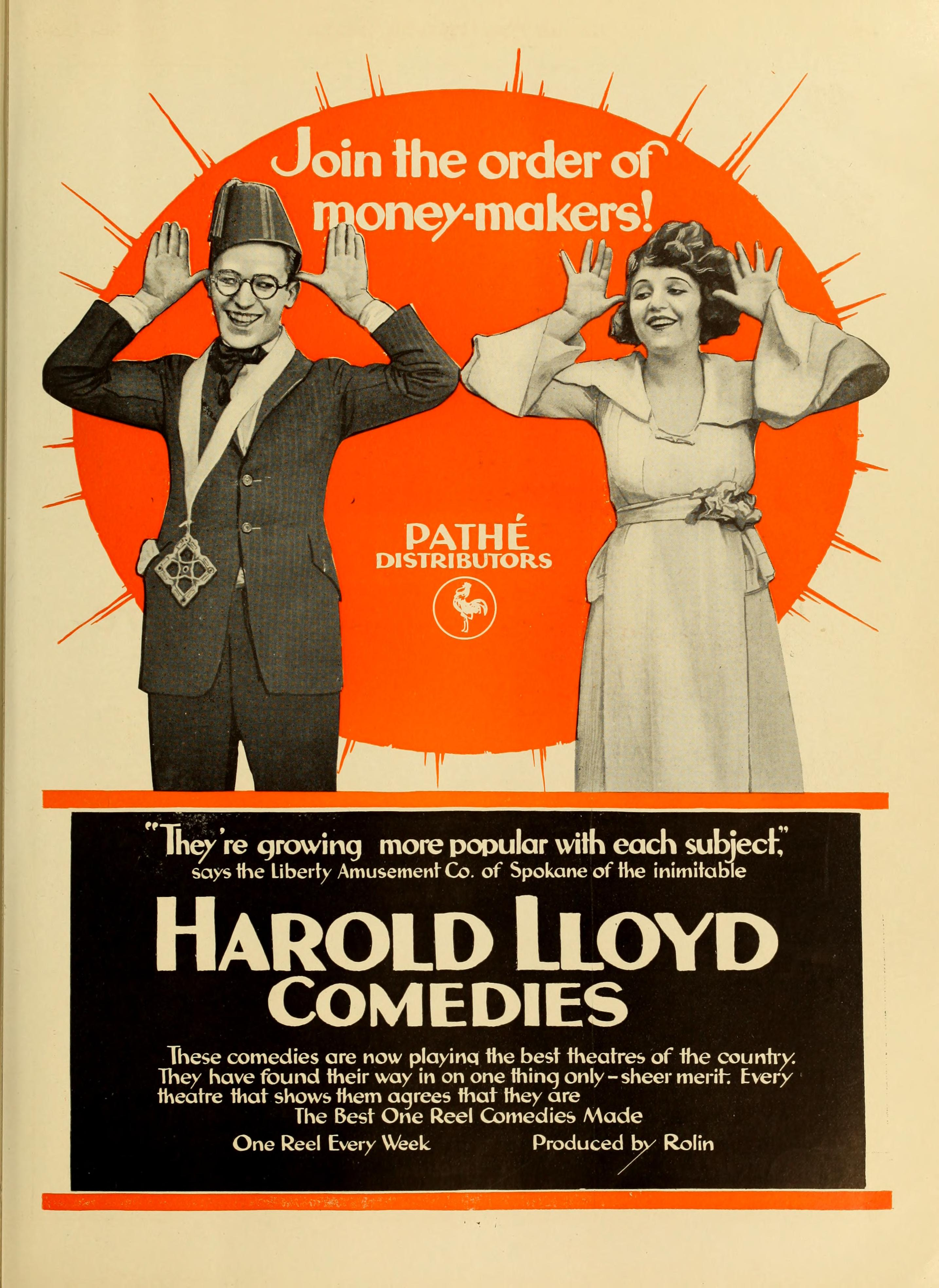
Advertisement for Harold Lloyd Comedies (1919)

These are the known films of Harold Lloyd (1893–1971), an American actor and filmmaker most famous for his hugely successful and influential silent film comedies.

Most of these films are known to survive in Lloyd's personal archive collection and in various film archives around the world. Some are also available on DVD or Blu-ray. The negatives of many of Lloyd's early short films were lost in a fire at his estate in 1943. The losses include five of the six Willie Work films, 53 of the 67 Lonesome Luke films, and 15 of the 81 one-reel Glasses character films. All of Lloyd's films from Bumping into Broadway (1919) onward exist in complete form in the archives. He carefully preserved his feature films, and they remain in excellent condition. All of the films are listed in order of release date.

== Early films ==
=== 1913 ===
In most of Lloyd's early films, he appeared as an uncredited extra or in a minor supporting role.

No.	Title	Release date	Director	Archive status
1.	The Old Monk's Tale	February 15, 1913	J. Searle Dawley	Exists
2.	Cupid in a Dental Parlor (Note: Unconfirmed appearance)	March 2, 1913	Mack Sennett	Unknown
3.	His Chum the Baron	March 12, 1913	Henry Lehrman	Unknown
4.	Algy on the Force	March 28, 1913	Henry Lehrman	Unknown
5.	The Twelfth Juror	April 19, 1913	George Lessey	Unknown
6.	Hulda of Holland	April 21, 1913	J. Searle Dawley	Unknown
7.	Rory o' the Bogs	December 20, 1913	J. Farrell MacDonald	Unknown

=== 1914 ===
No.	Title	Release date	Director(s)	Archive status
8.	Twixt Love and Fire	February 23, 1914	George Nichols	Unknown
9.	Sealed Orders	March 30, 1914	Unknown	Unknown
10.	Samson	April 30, 1914	J. Farrell MacDonald	Unknown
11.	The Sandhill Lovers	June 15, 1914	Unknown	Unknown
12.	The Patchwork Girl of Oz	September 29, 1914	J. Farrell MacDonald	Exists
13.	'Curses' They Remarked	November 5, 1914	Dell Henderson	Exists
14.	His Heart, His Hand and His Sword	November 9, 1914	George P. Hamilton Lorimer Johnston	Unknown

=== 1915 ===
No.	Title	Release date	Director(s)	Archive status
15.	Hogan's Romance Upset	February 13, 1915	Charles Avery	Exists
16.	Love, Loot and Crash	April 24, 1915	Nick Cogley	Exists
17.	Their Social Splash	April 26, 1915	Arvid E. Gillstrom Charles Avery	Exists
18.	Miss Fatty's Seaside Lovers	May 15, 1915	Roscoe Arbuckle	Exists
19.	From Italy's Shores	May 19, 1915	Otis Turner	Unknown
20.	Court House Crooks	July 5, 1915	Charles Parrott	Exists
21.	A Submarine Pirate	November 14, 1915	Charles Avery Syd Chaplin	Exists
22.	The New Adventures of Terrance O’Rourke	December 4, 1915	Otis Turner	Unknown

== Willie Work ==
=== 1915 ===
No.	Title	Release date	Director	Archive status
1.	Willie Runs the Park	January 2, 1915	Hal Roach	Lost
2.	Beyond His Fondest Hopes	January 30, 1915	Hal Roach	Lost
3.	Close-Cropped Clippings	January 30, 1915	Hal Roach	Lost
4.	Pete, the Pedal Polisher	January 30, 1915	Hal Roach	Lost
5.	Just Nuts	April 19, 1915	Hal Roach	Exists
6.	The Hungry Actors	June 17, 1915	Hal Roach	Lost

== Lonesome Luke ==
=== 1915 ===
No.	Title	Release date	Director	Archive status
1.	Spit-Ball Sadie	July 31, 1915	Hal Roach	Lost
2.	Terribly Stuck Up	August 28, 1915	Hal Roach	Lost
3.	A Mixup for Mazie	September 6, 1915	Hal Roach	Lost
4.	Some Baby	September 20, 1915	Hal Roach	Lost
5.	Fresh from the Farm	October 4, 1915	Hal Roach	Lost
6.	Giving Them Fits	November 1, 1915	Hal Roach	Exists
7.	Bughouse Bellhops	November 8, 1915	Hal Roach	Lost
8.	Tinkering with Trouble	November 17, 1915	Hal Roach	Lost
9.	Great While It Lasted	November 24, 1915	Hal Roach	Lost
10.	Ragtime Snap Shots	December 1, 1915	Hal Roach	Lost
11.	A Foozle at the Tee Party	December 8, 1915	Hal Roach	Lost
12.	Ruses, Rhymes and Roughnecks	December 15, 1915	Hal Roach	Lost
13.	Peculiar Patients' Pranks	December 22, 1915	Hal Roach	Exists
14.	Lonesome Luke, Social Gangster	December 29, 1915	Hal Roach	Lost

=== 1916 ===
No.	Title	Release date	Director	Archive status
15.	Lonesome Luke Leans to the Literary	January 5, 1916	Hal Roach	Lost
16.	Luke Lugs Luggage	January 10, 1916	Hal Roach	Lost
17.	Lonesome Luke Lolls in Luxury	January 19, 1916	Hal Roach	Lost
18.	Luke, the Candy Cut-Up	January 31, 1916	Hal Roach	Exists
19.	Luke Foils the Villain	February 16, 1916	Hal Roach	Lost
20.	Luke and the Rural Roughnecks	March 1, 1916	Hal Roach	Exists
21.	Luke Pipes the Pippins	March 15, 1916	Hal Roach	Lost
22.	Lonesome Luke, Circus King	March 29, 1916	Hal Roach	Lost
23.	Luke's Double	April 12, 1916	Hal Roach	Exists
24.	Them Was the Happy Days!	April 26, 1916	Hal Roach	Lost
25.	Luke and the Bomb Throwers	May 8, 1916	Hal Roach	Lost
26.	Luke's Late Lunchers	May 22, 1916	Hal Roach	Lost
27.	Luke Laughs Last	June 5, 1916	Hal Roach	Lost
28.	Luke's Fatal Flivver	June 19, 1916	Hal Roach	Lost
29.	Luke's Society Mixup	June 26, 1916	Hal Roach	Lost
30.	Luke's Washful Waiting	July 3, 1916	Hal Roach	Lost
31.	Luke Rides Roughshod	July 10, 1916	Hal Roach	Lost
32.	Luke, Crystal Gazer	July 24, 1916	Hal Roach	Exists
33.	Luke's Lost Lamb	August 7, 1916	Hal Roach	Lost
34.	Luke Does the Midway	August 21, 1916	Hal Roach	Lost
35.	Luke Joins the Navy	September 3, 1916	Hal Roach	Exists
36.	Luke and the Mermaids	September 17, 1916	Hal Roach	Lost
37.	Luke's Speedy Club Life	October 1, 1916	Hal Roach	Lost
38.	Luke and the Bang-Tails	October 15, 1916	Hal Roach	Exists
39.	Luke, the Chauffeur	October 29, 1916	Hal Roach	Lost
40.	Luke's Preparedness Preparations	November 5, 1916	Hal Roach	Lost
41.	Luke, the Gladiator	November 15, 1916	Hal Roach	Lost
42.	Luke, Patient Provider	November 19, 1916	Hal Roach	Lost
43.	Luke's Newsie Knockout	November 26, 1916	Hal Roach	Lost
44.	Luke's Movie Muddle	December 3, 1916	Hal Roach	Exists
45.	Luke, Rank Impersonator	December 10, 1916	Hal Roach	Lost
46.	Luke's Fireworks Fizzle	December 17, 1916	Hal Roach	Lost
47.	Luke Locates the Loot	December 24, 1916	Hal Roach	Exists
48.	Luke's Shattered Sleep	December 31, 1916	Hal Roach	Exists

=== 1917 ===
No.	Title	Release date	Director	Archive status
49.	Luke's Lost Liberty	January 7, 1917	Hal Roach	Lost
50.	Luke's Busy Day	January 21, 1917	Hal Roach	Lost
51.	Luke's Trolley Troubles	February 4, 1917	Hal Roach	Lost
52.	Lonesome Luke, Lawyer	February 18, 1917	Hal Roach	Lost
53.	Luke Wins Ye Ladye Faire (Note: From this film onwards until the end of the 'Lonesome Luke' series in December 1917, all releases were two reelers.)	February 25, 1917	Hal Roach	Lost
54.	Lonesome Luke's Lively Life	March 18, 1917	Hal Roach	Lost
55.	Lonesome Luke on Tin Can Alley	April 15, 1917	Hal Roach	Exists
56.	Lonesome Luke's Honeymoon	May 20, 1917	Hal Roach	Lost
57.	Lonesome Luke, Plumber	June 17, 1917	Hal Roach	Lost
58.	Stop! Luke! Listen!	July 15, 1917	Hal Roach	Lost
59.	Lonesome Luke, Messenger	August 5, 1917	Hal Roach	Exists
60.	Lonesome Luke, Mechanic	August 19, 1917	Hal Roach	Lost
61.	Lonesome Luke's Wild Women	September 2, 1917	Hal Roach	Exists
62.	Lonesome Luke Loses Patients	September 16, 1917	Hal Roach	Lost
63.	Birds of a Feather	October 7, 1917	Hal Roach	Lost
64.	From Laramie to London	October 21, 1917	Hal Roach	Lost
65.	Love, Laughs and Lather	November 4, 1917	Hal Roach	Lost
66.	Clubs Are Trump	November 18, 1917	Hal Roach	Exists
67.	We Never Sleep	December 2, 1917	Hal Roach	Lost

== Glasses character ("The Boy"): one-reel shorts ==
=== 1917 ===
No.	Title	Release date	Director(s)	Archive status
1.	Over the Fence	September 9, 1917	Harold Lloyd J. Farrell Macdonald	Exists
2.	Pinched	September 23, 1917	Harold Lloyd Gilbert Pratt	Exists
3.	By the Sad Sea Waves	September 30, 1917	Alfred J. Goulding	Exists
4.	Bliss	October 14, 1917	Alfred J. Goulding	Exists
5.	Rainbow Island	October 28, 1917	Gilbert Pratt	Exists
6.	The Flirt	November 11, 1917	Gilbert Pratt	Exists
7.	All Aboard	November 25, 1917	Alfred J. Goulding	Exists
8.	Move On	December 9, 1917	Gilbert Pratt	Exists
9.	Bashful	December 23, 1917	Alfred J. Goulding	Exists
10.	Step Lively (Note: A print exists, despite being listed as missing in the Lloyd collection.)	December 30, 1917	Alfred J. Goulding	Exists

=== 1918 ===
No.	Title	Release date	Director(s)	Archive status
11.	The Tip	January 6, 1918	Gilbert Pratt	Exists
12.	The Big Idea	January 20, 1918	Gilbert Pratt	Exists
13.	The Lamb	February 3, 1918	Gilbert Pratt Harold Lloyd	Lost
14.	Hit Him Again	February 17, 1918	Gilbert Pratt	Lost
15.	Beat It	February 24, 1918	Gilbert Pratt	Exists
16.	A Gasoline Wedding	March 3, 1918	Alfred J. Goulding	Exists
17.	Look Pleasant, Please	March 10, 1918	Alfred J. Goulding	Exists
18.	Here Come the Girls	March 17, 1918	Fred Fishback	Exists
19.	Let's Go	March 24, 1918	Alfred J. Goulding	Exists
20.	On the Jump	March 31, 1918	Alfred J. Goulding	Exists
21.	Follow the Crowd	April 7, 1918	Alfred J. Goulding	Exists
22.	Pipe the Whiskers	April 14, 1918	Alfred J. Goulding	Exists
23.	It's a Wild Life	April 21, 1918	Gilbert Pratt	Exists
24.	Hey There!	April 28, 1918	Gilbert Pratt	Exists
25.	Kicked Out	May 5, 1918	Alfred J. Goulding	Exists
26.	The Non-Stop Kid	May 12, 1918	Gilbert Pratt	Exists
27.	Two-Gun Gussie	May 19, 1918	Alfred J. Goulding	Exists
28.	Fireman Save My Child	May 26, 1918	Alfred J. Goulding	Exists
29.	The City Slicker	June 2, 1918	Gilbert Pratt	Exists
30.	Sic 'Em, Towser	June 8, 1918	Gilbert Pratt	Lost
31.	Somewhere in Turkey	June 16, 1918	Alfred J. Goulding	Exists
32.	Are Crooks Dishonest?	June 23, 1918	Gilbert Pratt	Exists
33.	An Ozark Romance	July 7, 1918	Alfred J. Goulding	Exists
34.	Kicking the Germ Out of Germany	July 21, 1918	Alfred J. Goulding	Exists
35.	That's Him	August 4, 1918	Gilbert Pratt	Exists
36.	Bride and Gloom	August 18, 1918	Alfred J. Goulding	Lost
37.	Two Scrambled	September 1, 1918	Gilbert Pratt	Lost
38.	Bees in His Bonnet	September 15, 1918	Gilbert Pratt	Lost
39.	Swing Your Partners	September 29, 1918	Alfred J. Goulding	Exists
40.	Why Pick on Me?	October 18, 1918	Gilbert Pratt	Exists
41.	Nothing but Trouble	October 27, 1918	Alfred J. Goulding	Exists
42.	Hear 'Em Rave	November 10, 1918	Gilbert Pratt	Exists
43.	Take a Chance	November 24, 1918	Alfred J. Goulding	Exists
44.	She Loves Me Not	December 29, 1918	Alfred J. Goulding	Exists

=== 1919 ===
No.	Title	Release date	Director(s)	Archive status
45.	Wanted – $5,000	January 12, 1919	Gilbert Pratt	Lost
46.	Going! Going! Gone! (Note: A French print exists, despite being listed as missing in the Lloyd collection.)	January 26, 1919	Gilbert Pratt	Exists
47.	Ask Father	February 9, 1919	Hal Roach	Exists
48.	On the Fire	February 23, 1919	Alfred J. Goulding	Exists
49.	I'm on My Way	March 9, 1919	Alfred J. Goulding	Exists
50.	Look Out Below	March 16, 1919	Hal Roach	Exists
51.	The Dutiful Dub	March 23, 1919	Alfred J. Goulding	Exists
52.	Next Aisle Over	March 30, 1919	Alfred J. Goulding	Exists
53.	A Sammy in Siberia	April 6, 1919	Hal Roach	Exists
54.	Just Dropped In	April 13, 1919	Hal Roach	Exists
55.	Crack Your Heels	April 20, 1919	Alfred J. Goulding	Exists
56.	Ring Up the Curtain	April 27, 1919	Alfred J. Goulding	Exists
57.	Young Mr. Jazz	May 4, 1919	Hal Roach	Exists
58.	Si, Senor	May 11, 1919	Alfred J. Goulding	Lost
59.	Before Breakfast	May 18, 1919	Hal Roach	Exists
60.	The Marathon	May 25, 1919	Alfred J. Goulding	Exists
61.	Back to the Woods	June 1, 1919	Hal Roach	Exists
62.	Pistols for Breakfast	June 8, 1919	Alfred J. Goulding	Exists
63.	Swat the Crook	June 13, 1919	Hal Roach	Exists
64.	Off the Trolley	June 22, 1919	Alfred J. Goulding	Exists
65.	Spring Fever	June 29, 1919	Hal Roach Frank Terry	Exists
66.	Billy Blazes, Esq.	July 6, 1919	Hal Roach	Exists
67.	Just Neighbors	July 13, 1919	Harold Lloyd Frank Terry	Exists
68.	At the Old Stage Door	July 20, 1919	Hal Roach	Exists
69.	Never Touched Me	July 27, 1919	Alfred J. Goulding	Exists
70.	A Jazzed Honeymoon	August 3, 1919	Hal Roach	Exists
71.	Count Your Change	August 10, 1919	Alfred J. Goulding	Exists
72.	Chop Suey & Co.	August 17, 1919	Alfred J. Goulding	Exists
73.	Heap Big Chief	August 24, 1919	Alfred J. Goulding	Exists
74.	Don't Shove	August 31, 1919	Alfred J. Goulding	Exists
75.	Be My Wife	September 7, 1919	Hal Roach	Exists
76.	The Rajah	September 14, 1919	Hal Roach	Lost
77.	He Leads, Others Follow	September 21, 1919	Hal Roach Vincent Bryan	Lost
78.	Soft Money	September 28, 1919	Hal Roach Vincent Bryan	Lost
79.	Count the Votes	October 5, 1919	Hal Roach	Lost
80.	Pay Your Dues	October 12, 1919	Hal Roach Vincent Bryan	Exists
81.	His Only Father	October 19, 1919	Hal Roach Frank Terry	Lost

== Glasses character ("The Boy"): two-/three-reel shorts ==
From this point onward, all of Lloyd's films exist in the archives.

=== 1919 ===
No.	Title	Release date	Length	Director	Character type	Leading lady
1.	Bumping into Broadway	November 2, 1919	2300 ft.	Hal Roach	Playwright	Bebe Daniels
2.	Captain Kidd's Kids	November 30, 1919	2000 ft.	Hal Roach	Rich Bachelor	Bebe Daniels
3.	From Hand to Mouth	December 28, 1919	2200 ft.	Alfred J. Goulding	Penniless Young Man	Mildred Davis

=== 1920 ===
No.	Title	Release date	Length	Director(s)	Character type	Leading lady
4.	His Royal Slyness	February 8, 1920	2700 ft.	Hal Roach	Book Salesman	Mildred Davis
5.	Haunted Spooks	March 21, 1920	2500 ft.	Hal Roach Alfred J. Goulding	Rejected Suitor	Mildred Davis
6.	An Eastern Westerner	May 2, 1920	2000 ft.	Hal Roach	Wealthy New Yorker	Mildred Davis
7.	High and Dizzy	July 11, 1920	2600 ft.	Hal Roach	Doctor	Mildred Davis
8.	Get Out and Get Under	September 12, 1920	2500 ft.	Hal Roach	New Car Owner	Mildred Davis
9.	Number, Please?	December 26, 1920	2300 ft.	Hal Roach Fred Newmeyer	Lonely Young Man	Mildred Davis

=== 1921 ===
No.	Title	Release date	Length	Director(s)	Character type	Leading lady
10.	Now or Never	May 5, 1921	3600 ft.	Hal Roach Fred Newmeyer	Childhood Sweetheart	Mildred Davis
11.	Among Those Present	July 3, 1921	3500 ft.	Fred Newmeyer	Ambitious Young Man	Mildred Davis
12.	I Do	September 11, 1921	2600 ft.	Fred Newmeyer	Babysitter	Mildred Davis
13.	Never Weaken	October 22, 1921	2900 ft.	Fred Newmeyer	Businessman	Mildred Davis

=== 1923 ===
No.	Title	Release date	Length	Director(s)	Character type
1.	Dogs of War!	July 1, 1923	2900ft.	Robert F. McGowan	Self

- Dogs of War! (1923), an Our Gang comedy filmed along with the feature film Why Worry?. Lloyd played himself.

== Feature-length films ==
Lloyd starred in a total of 18 feature-length motion pictures, consisting of 11 silent and seven sound films. Lloyd also reedited his material into two compilation features.

=== Silent features ===
No.	Title	Release date	Length	Director(s)	Character name	Character type	Leading lady	Story
1	A Sailor-Made Man	December 25, 1921	3846 ft.	Fred Newmeyer	The Boy	Rich Idler	Mildred Davis	Must prove worthy of girl, joins navy, rescues her from a maharajah in Middle Eastern city.
2	Grandma's Boy	September 3, 1922	4841 ft.	Fred Newmeyer	The Boy (Sonny / Harold)	Meek Country Boy; Granddaddy	Mildred Davis	Cowardly country boy gains courage from magic charm, Civil War flashback. Lloyd's favorite film.
3	Dr. Jack	November 23, 1922	4700 ft.	Fred Newmeyer	Dr. Jackson (Jack)	Successful Country Doctor	Mildred Davis	Small-town country doctor uses common sense to cure patients.
4	Safety Last!	April 1, 1923	6300 ft.	Fred Newmeyer; Sam Taylor	Harold Lloyd	Industrious Go-Getter	Mildred Davis	Country boy goes to city to be a success, ends up climbing building as stunt. Last film with Davis, whom he married.
5	Why Worry?	September 16, 1923	5500 ft.	Fred Newmeyer; Sam Taylor	Harold Van Pelham	Wealthy Hypochondriac	Jobyna Ralston	Hypochondriac goes to South America for rest, lands in revolution. Last Lloyd film produced by Hal Roach.
6	Girl Shy	March 28, 1924	7457 ft.	Fred Newmeyer; Sam Taylor	The Poor Boy (Harold Meadows)	Shy Dreamer	Jobyna Ralston	Shy stutterer writes book on sex, must rescue girl from marrying wrong man. Race sequence at end.
7	Hot Water	October 26, 1924	4899 ft.	Fred Newmeyer; Sam Taylor	Hubby	Hen-Pecked Husband	Jobyna Ralston	Family situation comedy, episodic, live turkey on trolley, madcap car ride, haunted-house finale.
8	The Freshman	September 30, 1925	6883 ft.	Fred Newmeyer; Sam Taylor	Harold Lamb	College Go-Getter	Jobyna Ralston	Popularity-conscious student tries to be "Big Man on Campus," finally wins big football game and girl.
9	For Heaven's Sake	April 5, 1926	5356 ft.	Sam Taylor	The Updown Boy (J. Harold Mannors)	Debonaire Millionaire	Jobyna Ralston	Rich man aids slum mission, must get drunks to wedding on time.
10	The Kid Brother	January 17, 1927	7654 ft.	Ted Wilde; J. A. Howe; Lewis Milestone (uncredited); Harold Lloyd (uncredited)	Harold Hickory	Bashful Farm Boy	Jobyna Ralston	Son of sheriff must prove his manhood, captures crook, returns stolen money, wins girl.
11	Speedy	April 7, 1928 (silent version); December 15, 1928 (added dialogue sequences)	7776 ft.	Ted Wilde (silent version); Clyde Bruckman (sound version)	Harold "Speedy" Swift	Carefree City Boy	Ann Christy	Baseball-crazed city boy can't keep job, upsets mobsters plans to ruin old man's business. New York location, Babe Ruth appearance. Lloyd's only part-talking feature.

=== Sound features ===
No.	Title	Release date	Length	Director(s)	Character name	Character type	Leading lady	Story
1	Welcome Danger	October 12, 1929	10297 ft. 115 minutes	Mal St. Clair; Clyde Bruckman	Harold Bledsoe	Industrious Detective	Barbara Kent	Botanist-turned-sleuth thwarts Chinese hoods in San Francisco. Lloyd's first all-talking feature.
2	Feet First	November 8, 1930	8130 ft. 90 minutes	Clyde Bruckman	Harold Horne	Ambitious Fumbler	Barbara Kent	Shoe salesman pretends to be successful businessman. Gags on boat, big-thrill building climb at end. Episodic.
3	Movie Crazy	September 23, 1932	8852 ft. 98 minutes	Clyde Bruckman	Harold Hall	Meek Fumbler	Constance Cummings	Boy tries to make good in Hollywood.
4	The Cat's-Paw	August 7, 1934	9157 ft. 102 minutes	Sam Taylor	Ezekiel Cobb	Missionary turned Reformer	Una Merkel; Grace Bradley	Accidentally elected mayor, naive reformer takes brunt of political machine. Oriental setting.
5	The Milky Way	March 25, 1936	8010 ft. 89 minutes	Leo McCarey	Burleigh Sullivan	Milkman turned Prizefighter	Verree Teasdale; Helen Mack; Dorothy Wilson	Quick-paced verbal comedy with top supporting cast. Fixed fights send weakling to championship fight.
6	Professor Beware	July 29, 1938	8550 ft. 93 minutes	Elliott Nugent	Prof. Dean Lambert	Fumbling Professor	Phyllis Welch	Egyptologist searches for missing tablets.
7	The Sin of Harold Diddlebock (original release title)	April 4, 1947	8010 ft. 89 minutes	Preston Sturges	Harold Diddlebock	Clerk turned Promotor	Frances Ramsden	Man's first drink changes him into live wire, thrill on high building again. Recut by Howard Hughes.
7	Mad Wednesday (re-issue title)	October 28, 1950	6930 ft. 76 minutes	Preston Sturges	Harold Diddlebock	Clerk turned Promotor	Frances Ramsden	Man's first drink changes him into live wire, thrill on high building again. Recut by Howard Hughes.

=== Compilations ===
No.	Title	Release date	Description
1	Harold Lloyd's World of Comedy	1962	An anthology of comedy sequences, mostly from Safety Last!, The Freshman, Hot Water, Why Worry?, Girl Shy, Professor Beware, Movie Crazy, and Feet First.
2	The Funny Side of Life	1963	Another compilation, produced and edited by Lloyd. Not generally distributed in the United States.

=== As producer only ===
Harold Lloyd's company Hollywood Productions made a series of short subject comedies starring Edward Everett Horton in 1927 and 1928. He also produced, but did not star in, two feature films.

No.	Title	Release date	Director(s)	Stars
1	A Girl, a Guy and a Gob	1941	Richard Wallace	Lucille Ball, George Murphy, Edmond O'Brien, and Franklin Pangborn
2	My Favorite Spy	1942	Tay Garnett	Kay Kyser, Ellen Drew, Jane Wyman, and Robert Armstrong

== Bibliography ==
- Reilly, Adam (1977). Harold Lloyd – "The King of Daredevil Comedy." New York: Collier Books.
- Schickel, Richard (1974). Harold Lloyd – The Shape of Laughter. Boston: New York Graphic Society.
