= Spit-Ball Sadie =

1915 film

- Directed by: Hal Roach
- Written by: Ted Dorgan
- Produced by: Hal Roach
- Starring: Harold Lloyd
- Release date: July 26, 1915
- Country: United States
- Languages: Silent; English intertitles

Spit-Ball Sadie is a 1915 American short comedy film featuring Harold Lloyd. It was Lloyd's first appearance as his "Lonesome Luke" character. It is considered a lost film, as no copies are known to exist.

== Cast ==
- Harold Lloyd - Lonesome Luke
- Gene Marsh
- Jack Spinks

== See also ==
- Harold Lloyd filmography
