= Pete, the Pedal Polisher =

1915 film

- Directed by: Hal Roach
- Produced by: Hal Roach
- Starring: Harold Lloyd
- Release date: January 30, 1915
- Country: United States
- Languages: Silent; English intertitles

Pete, the Pedal Polisher is a 1915 American short comedy film featuring Harold Lloyd. It is considered a lost film.

== Cast ==
- Harold Lloyd

== See also ==
- Harold Lloyd filmography
