= Auntie's Portrait =

1915 film by George D. Baker

- Directed by: George D. Baker
- Written by: Sam Smiles
- Starring: Sidney Drew; Ethel Lee
- Distributed by: General Film Company
- Release date: January 1, 1915
- Country: United States
- Languages: Silent; English intertitles

Auntie's Portrait is a 1915 short comedy film.
