= From Italy's Shores =

1915 film

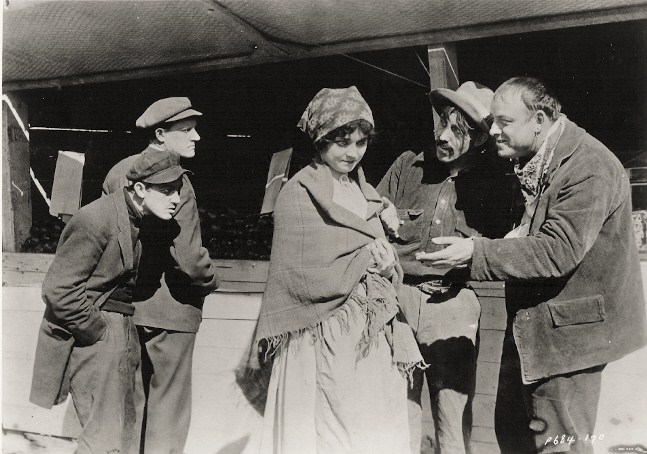
- (left to right) Harold Lloyd, unknown, Jane Novak, unknown, and Roy Stewart
- Directed by: Otis Turner
- Written by: James Dayton
- Produced by: Carl Laemmle
- Starring: Harold Lloyd
- Release date: May 19, 1915
- Country: United States
- Language: Silent with English intertitles

From Italy's Shores is a 1915 American short drama film featuring Harold Lloyd.

== Cast ==
- Roy Stewart
- Jane Novak
- Harold Lloyd

== See also ==
- Harold Lloyd filmography
