= The Hungry Actors =

1915 film

- Directed by: Hal Roach
- Starring: Harold Lloyd
- Release date: June 17, 1915
- Running time: 20 minutes
- Country: United States
- Languages: Silent; English intertitles

The Hungry Actors is a 1915 American short comedy film featuring Harold Lloyd. It's now a lost film.

== Cast ==
- Roy Stewart
- Jane Novak
- Harold Lloyd
- Neely Edwards
- Violet MacMillan
- Martha Mattox
- Bobby Vernon

== See also ==
- Harold Lloyd filmography
