= Lonesome Luke, Social Gangster =

1915 film

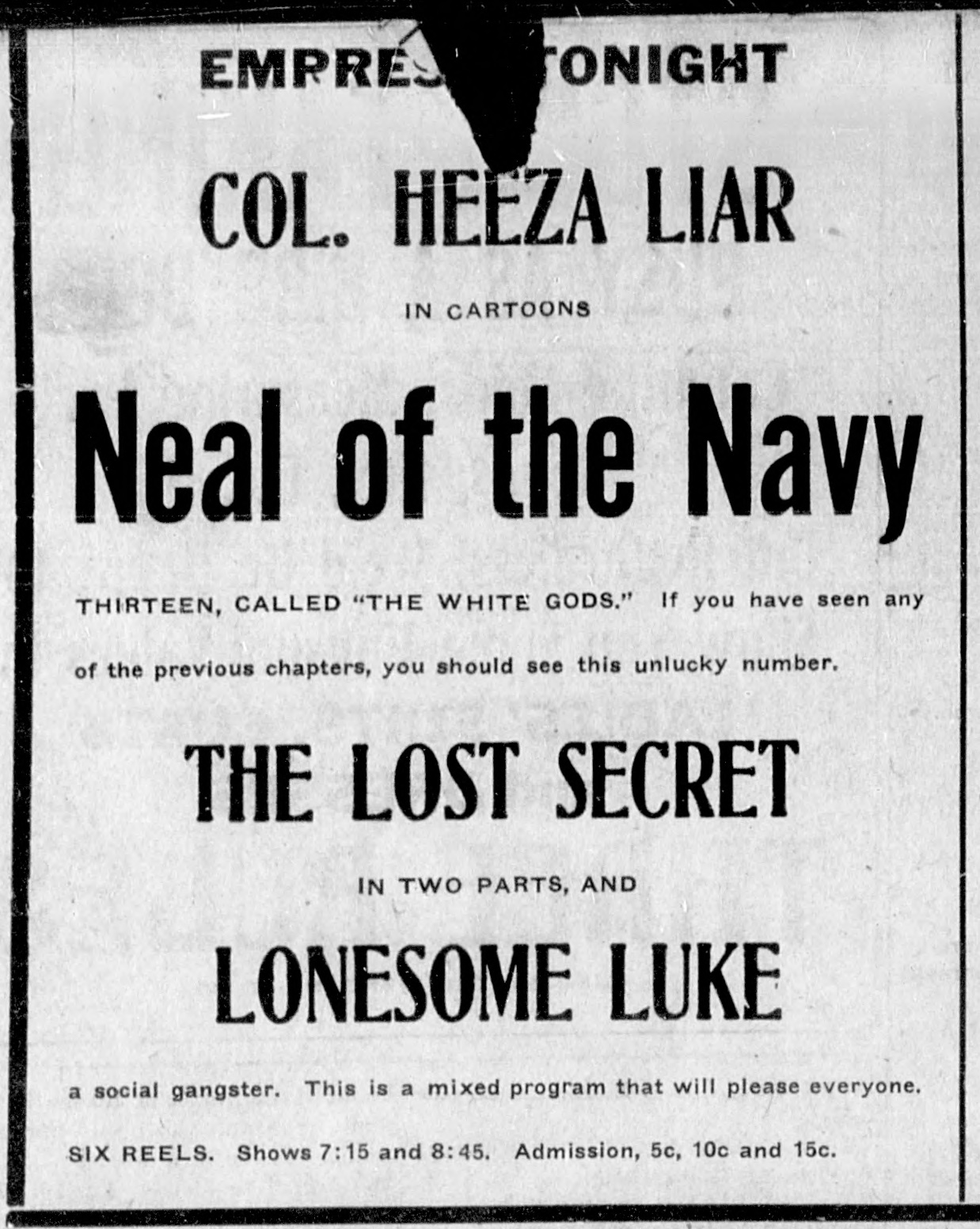
- Contemporary advertisement
- Directed by: J. Farrell MacDonald; Hal Roach
- Produced by: Hal Roach
- Starring: Harold Lloyd
- Release date: December 29, 1915
- Country: United States
- Languages: Silent; English intertitles

Lonesome Luke, Social Gangster is a 1915 American short comedy film featuring Harold Lloyd.

== Cast ==
- Harold Lloyd as Lonesome Luke
- Snub Pollard (as Harry Pollard)
- Gene Marsh
- Bebe Daniels

== See also ==
- Harold Lloyd filmography
