= Heritage (1915 film) =

1915 American drama film directed by Robert Z. Leonard

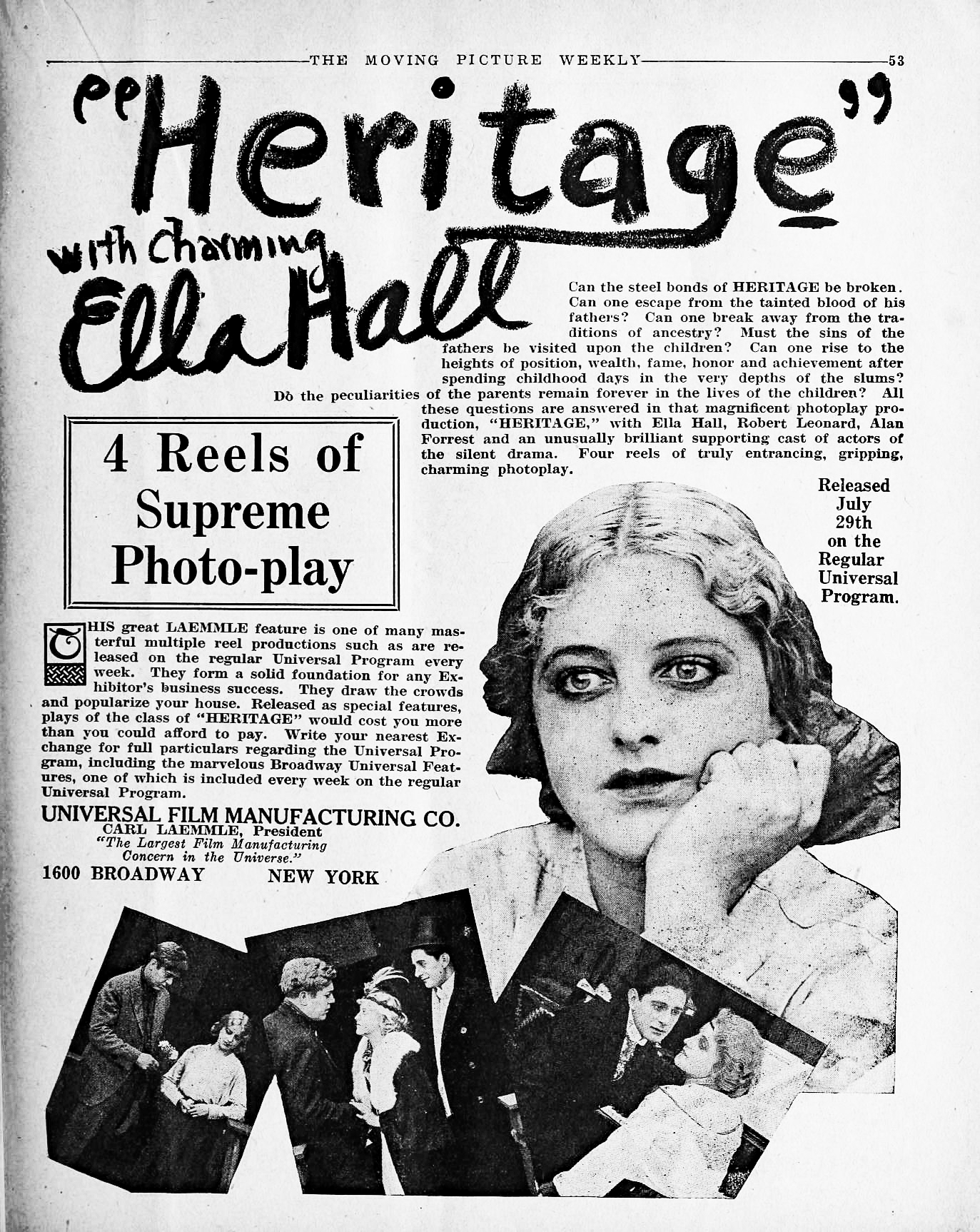
- Magazine ad for movie
- Directed by: Robert Z. Leonard
- Written by: Harry G. Stafford
- Story by: Robert Z. Leonard
- Produced by: Carl Laemmle
- Starring: Robert Z. Leonard; Ella Hall
- Production company: Universal Studios
- Distributed by: Universal
- Release date: July 29, 1915
- Running time: 40 minutes; 4 reels
- Country: United States
- Language: Silent (English intertitles)

Heritage is a 1915 American short drama film. Robert Z. Leonard created the story line, starred in, and directed this silent motion picture. The film also features Ella Hall.

The film was produced by Carl Laemmle, distributed by Universal and released in the United States on July 29, 1915.

== Cast ==
- Robert Z. Leonard as Big Bill McMahon
- Ella Hall as Kate McMahon
- Mae Talbot as His mother
- Marc Fenton as His father
- Allan Forrest as Guy Melton
- Anne Lehr as Marion Melton
- Helen Wright as Mrs. Melton

== Preservation ==
According to the Library of Congress, all known copies of this film are lost.

The National Film Preservation Board (NFPB) included this film on its list of Lost U.S. Silent Feature Films as of February 2021.
