= Some Baby =

1915 film

- Directed by: Hal Roach
- Produced by: Hal Roach
- Starring: Harold Lloyd
- Release date: September 20, 1915
- Country: United States
- Languages: Silent; English intertitles

Some Baby is a 1915 American short comedy film featuring Harold Lloyd. It is considered a lost film.

== Cast ==
- Harold Lloyd - Lonesome Luke
- Gene Marsh
- Elsie Greeson
- Jack Spinks
- Arthur Harrison

== Reception ==
In a review on September 25, 1915, The Moving Picture World wrote that the film "ensures a good many laughs. The situation is first class and the players are lively and amusing."

== See also ==
- Harold Lloyd filmography
