= Ragtime Snap Shots =

1915 film

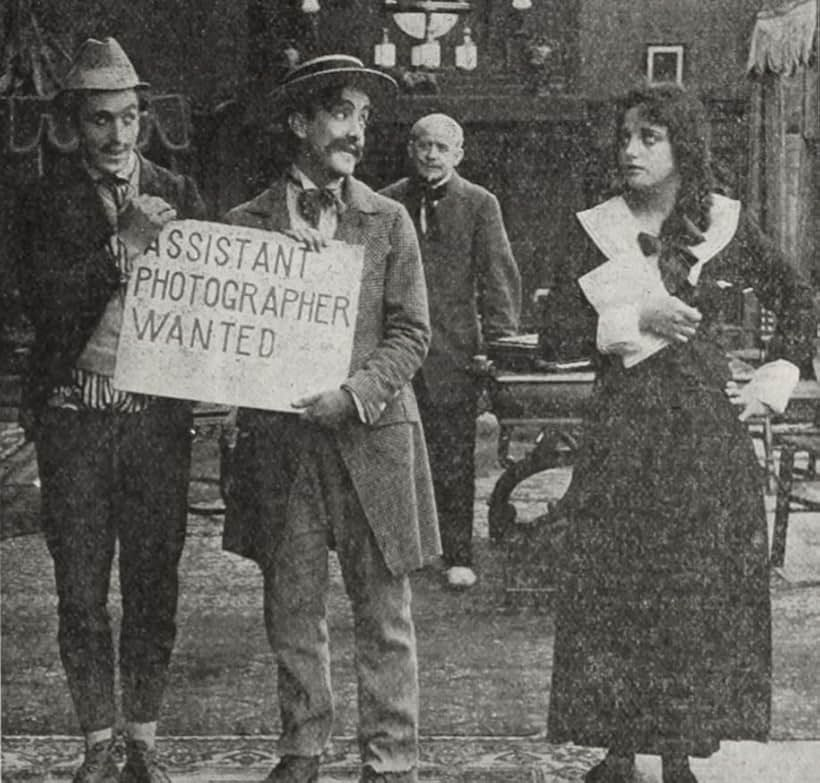
- Directed by: Hal Roach
- Written by: Dolly Twist
- Produced by: Hal Roach
- Starring: Harold Lloyd
- Release date: December 1, 1915
- Country: United States
- Languages: Silent; English intertitles

Ragtime Snap Shots is a 1915 American short comedy film featuring Harold Lloyd. It is considered a lost film.

== Cast ==
- Harold Lloyd as Lonesome Luke
- Snub Pollard (as Harry Pollard)
- Earl Mohan
- Gene Marsh
- Bebe Daniels
- Billy Fay

== See also ==
- Harold Lloyd filmography
