= Tinkering with Trouble =

1915 film

- Directed by: Hal Roach
- Written by: Dolly Twist
- Produced by: Hal Roach
- Starring: Harold Lloyd
- Release date: November 17, 1915
- Country: United States
- Languages: Silent; English intertitles

Tinkering with Trouble is a 1915 American short comedy film featuring Harold Lloyd. It is considered a lost film.

== Cast ==
- Harold Lloyd - Lonesome Luke aka Easy Otis
- Snub Pollard - (as Harry Pollard)
- Gene Marsh
- Bebe Daniels
