= Snub Pollard =

Australian actor (1889–1962)

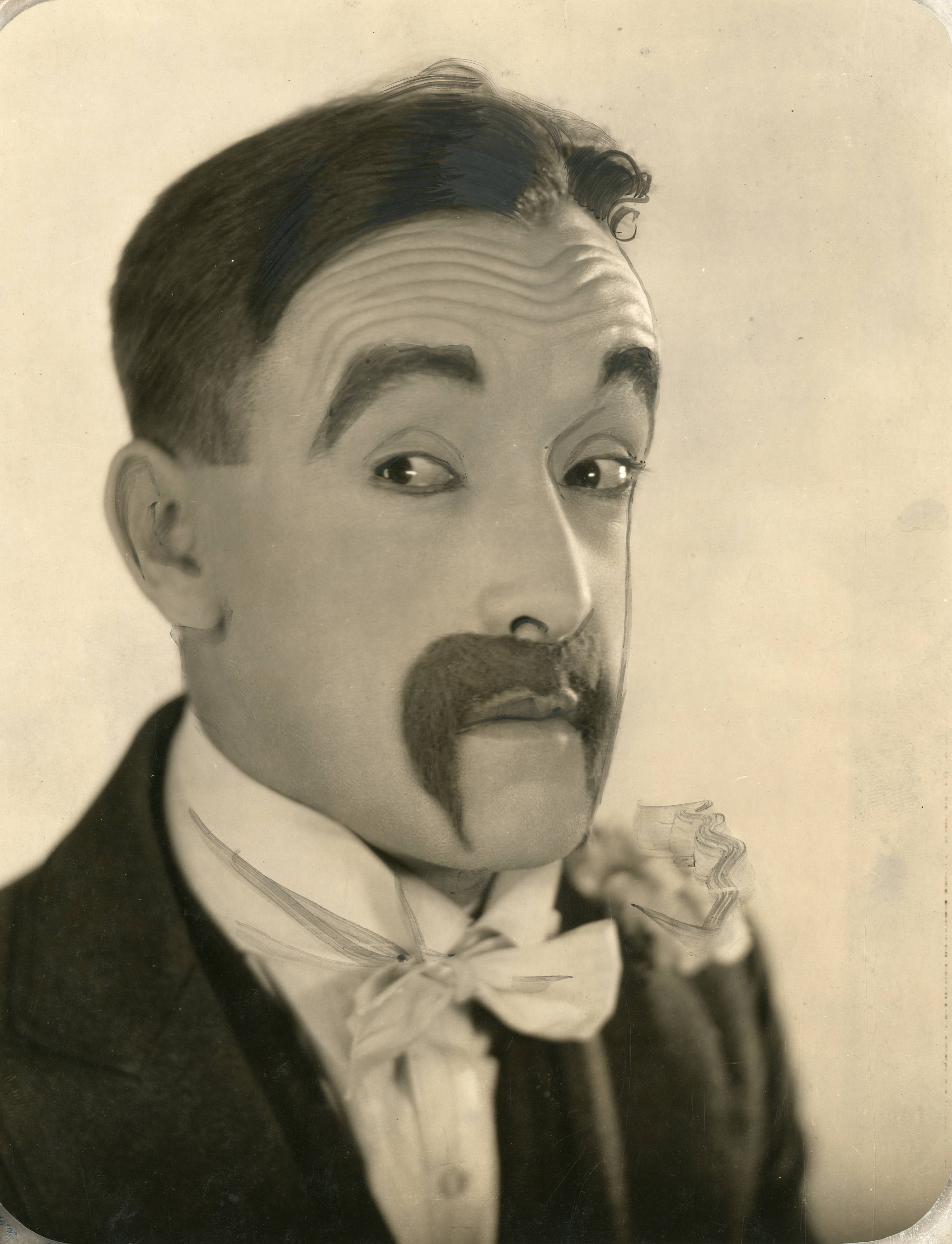
- Pollard in 1925
- Born: Harold Fraser; 9 November 1889; Melbourne, Victoria, Australia
- Died: 19 January 1962 (aged 72); Burbank, California, U.S.
- Resting place: Forest Lawn Memorial Park, Hollywood Hills, California, U.S.
- Occupations: Actor, comedian
- Years active: 1913–1962

Harold Fraser (9 November 1889 – 19 January 1962), known professionally as Snub Pollard, was an Australian-born vaudevillian who became a silent film comedian in Hollywood, popular in the 1920s.

== Career ==
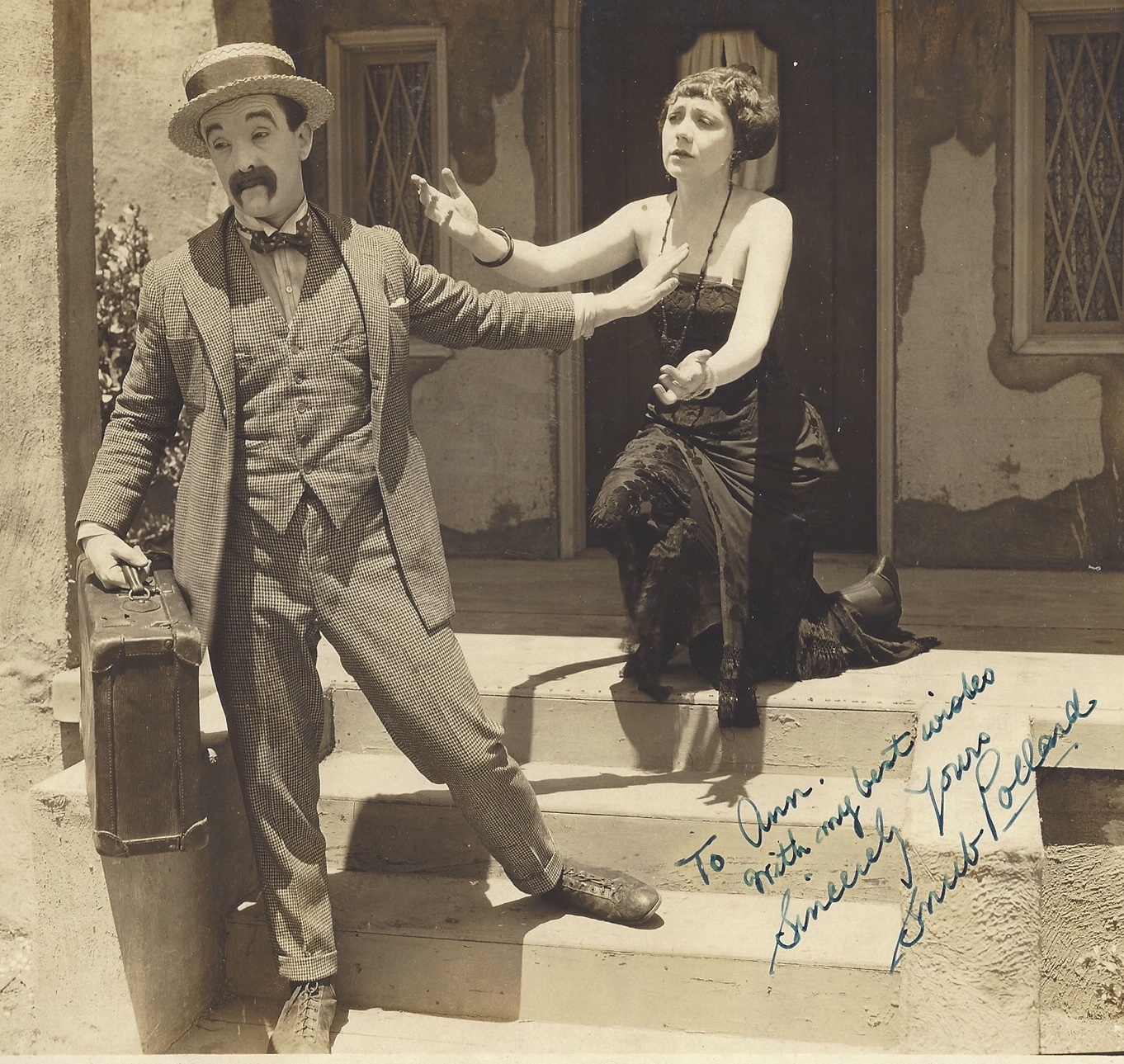
Publicity photo

Born in Melbourne, Australia, on 9 November 1889, young Harry Fraser began performing with Pollard's Lilliputian Opera Company. The company ran several highly successful professional children's troupes that traveled Australia and New Zealand in the late nineteenth and early twentieth century. Like many of the actors in the popular juvenile company -- among them Daphne Trott -- Fraser adopted Pollard as his stage name. In 1908, Harry Pollard joined the company tour to North America. After the completion of the tour, he returned to the United States. By 1915, he was regularly appearing in uncredited roles in movies, for example, Charles Epting notes that Pollard can clearly be seen in Chaplin's 1915 short By the Sea. In later years, Pollard said Hal Roach had discovered him while he was performing on stage in Los Angeles.

Pollard and Bebe Daniels played supporting roles in the early films of Harold Lloyd. The long-faced Pollard sported a Kaiser Wilhelm mustache turned upside-down; this became his trademark. When Lloyd advanced to feature films, Lloyd's producer Hal Roach conferred Lloyd's short-subject series to Pollard. The most famous Snub Pollard comedy is 1923's It's a Gift, in which he plays an inventor of many Rube Goldberg-like contraptions, including a car that runs by magnet power.

In early 1923, shortly after his second marriage, Pollard returned with his wife Elizabeth to see his relations in Australia. His visit attracted considerable attention, and he appeared again in several theaters to speak about the motion picture business.

Pollard's contract lapsed in 1925 and Roach did not renew it. (Roach continued to release new Pollard comedies and reprints of old ones into 1926.) Pollard turned to the vaudeville stage for employment, and embarked on a 12-month tour of personal appearances.

Pollard returned to motion pictures when he was signed by the low-budget Weiss Brothers-Artclass studio in May 1926. Weiss allowed Pollard to complete his vaudeville commitment. Motion Picture World reported that Pollard "will continue his two-a-day performances in between the new series of comedies to be produced, in order that his newly gained vaudeville popularity may be made effective for his forthcoming films." Pollard was the first star name to make comedies for Weiss; the studio's other series were all based on comic characters (Winnie Winkle, Hairbreadth Harry, Izzie and Lizzie) and the performers' names were not promoted.

Pollard's first two-reelers for Weiss were solo vehicles, but he was soon teamed with Mack Sennett "fat" comic Marvin Loback as a poor man's version of Laurel and Hardy. The "Snub and Fat" characters copied the plots and gags of "Stan and Ollie". Despite the inevitable comparisons, the silent-comedy series was successful within its smaller market and ran for three years. The series finale, Sock and Run, was released in December 1929. Pollard and Loback were never billed as a team; Pollard was always the headliner, and Loback led the supporting cast.

The new talking pictures were a challenge for many silent stars, but Pollard made the transition. Producer Louis Weiss did not have access to soundstages in Hollywood, so in July 1929 Weiss sent Pollard and director Leslie Goodwins to New York, to film a new series of 10 talking two-reelers at the Lee DeForest Phonofilm studio. Two shorts were completed -- Here We Are (1929) and Pipe Down (1929) -- before the stock market crash of October 1929 halted further production. Pipe Down was received poorly; Variety called it "third-rate vaude stuff trying to pass off as film comedy." The review noted that most of the action took place on a single interior set, reflecting the limited space of the DeForest studio.

The Weiss Bros. suspended production indefinitely and Pollard was again unemployed. In the wake of the crash, he announced plans for a series of talking comedies to be produced independently, at the Metropolitan Studio in Fort Lee, New Jersey. The plans fell through and Pollard returned to California, in hopes of landing work in feature films as a character comic. His first talking feature was Ex-Flame (1930) for the independent Liberty Pictures.

In the 1930s, Pollard said the Great Depression wiped out his investments and he could not adjust to the talkies. He played small speaking parts in comedies and comic relief in "B" westerns. Pollard remarried in 1935, to the former Ruth Bridges; the couple divorced in 1939.

His silent-comedy credentials guaranteed him work in slapstick revivals. He appeared with other film veterans in Hollywood Cavalcade (1939), The Perils of Pauline (1947), and Man of a Thousand Faces (1957). He also appeared regularly as a supporting player in Columbia Pictures' two-reel comedies of the mid-1940s, and was a latter-day member of the Keystone Cops in movies and personal appearances.

Forsaking his familiar mustache in his later years, he landed much steadier work in films as a mostly uncredited bit player. He played incidental roles in dozens of Hollywood features and shorts, almost always as a mousy, nondescript fellow, usually with no dialogue. In Wheeler & Woolsey's Cockeyed Cavaliers (1934), he plays a drunken doctor; at the end of Miracle on 34th Street (1947), when a squad of bailiffs hauling sacks of mail enters the courtroom, Pollard brings up the rear. In Singin' in the Rain, he receives the umbrella of Gene Kelly after his famous "Singin' in the Rain" scene. In Frank Capra's Pocketful of Miracles (1961), Pollard plays a Broadway beggar. Twist Around the Clock (1961) shows him reacting wordlessly to a curvaceous woman dancing energetically. His last picture was The Man Who Shot Liberty Valance (filmed in 1961; released 1962).

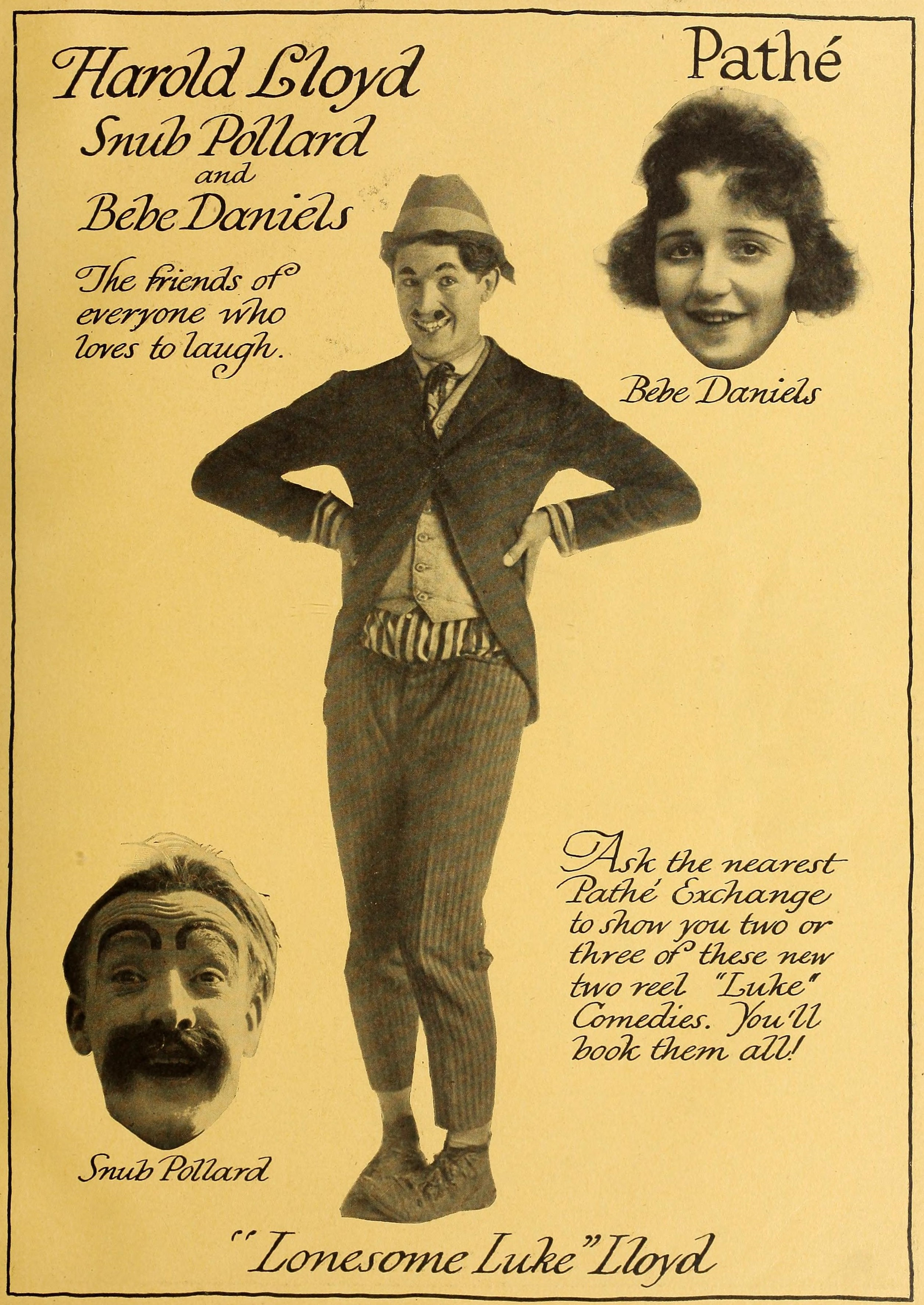
Harold Lloyd (center) early in his career with Pollard (lower left) and Bebe Daniels

== Death and recognition ==
Pollard died of cancer on 19 January 1962, aged 72, after nearly 50 years in the movie business. His interment was at Forest Lawn Memorial Park (Hollywood Hills).

For his contributions to motion pictures, Pollard has a star on the Hollywood Walk of Fame at 6415½ Hollywood Boulevard.

== Selected filmography ==
- Sally Scraggs: Housemaid (1913, Short) as Butler
- A Coat Tale (1915, Short) (as Harry Pollard)
- By the Sea (1915, Short) as Ice Cream Clerk (uncredited)
- His Regeneration (1915, Short) as Extra (uncredited)
- Giving Them Fits (1915, Short) as Luke's Co-Worker (as Harry Pollard)
- Bughouse Bellhops (1915, Short) as Moke Morpheus (as Harry Pollard)
- Tinkering with Trouble (1915, Short) as Sourball Joe (as Harry Pollard)
- Great While It Lasted (1915, Short) as Hugo Snubb
- Ragtime Snap Shots (1915, Short) as Snub Larkin (as Harry Pollard)
- A Foozle at the Tee Party (1915, Short) (as Harry Pollard)
- Ruses, Rhymes and Roughnecks (1915, Short) (as Harry Pollard)
- Peculiar Patients' Pranks (1915, Short) (as Harry Pollard)
- Lonesome Luke, Social Gangster (1915, Short) as Tin-Horn Tommy (as Harry Pollard)
- Police (1916, Short) as First Flophouse Customer (uncredited)
- Lonesome Luke Leans to the Literary (1916, Short)
- Luke Lugs Luggage (1916, Short)
- Lonesome Luke Lolls in Luxury (1916, Short) as Snub
- Luke, the Candy Cut-Up (1916, Short)
- Luke Foils the Villain (1916, Short)
- Luke and the Rural Roughnecks (1916, Short)
- Luke Pipes the Pippins (1916, Short)
- Lonesome Luke, Circus King (1916, Short)
- Luke's Double (1916, Short)
- Them Was the Happy Days! (1916, Short) as Snub
- Luke and the Bomb Throwers (1916, Short)
- Luke's Late Lunchers (1916, Short)
- Luke Laughs Last (1916, Short)
- Luke's Fatal Flivver (1916, Short)
- Luke's Society Mixup (1916, Short)
- Luke's Washful Waiting (1916, Short)
- Luke Rides Roughshod (1916, Short)
- Luke's Lost Lamb (1916, Short)
- Luke, Crystal Gazer (1916, Short)
- Luke Does the Midway (1916, Short)
- Luke Joins the Navy (1916, Short)
- Luke and the Mermaids (1916, Short)
- Luke's Speedy Club Life (1916, Short) as Bellhop
- Luke and the Bang-Tails (1916, Short)
- Luke, the Chauffeur (1916, Short)
- Luke's Preparedness Preparations (1916, Short)
- Luke, the Gladiator (1916)
- Luke, Patient Provider (1916, Short)
- Luke's Newsie Knockout (1916, Short)
- Luke's Movie Muddle (1916, Short) as Projectionist
- Luke, Rank Impersonator (1916, Short)
- Luke's Fireworks Fizzle (1916, Short)
- Luke Locates the Loot (1916, Short)
- Luke's Shattered Sleep (1916, Short)
- Lonesome Luke's Lovely Rifle (1917, Short)
- Luke's Lost Liberty (1917, Short)
- Luke's Busy Day (1917, Short)
- Luke's Trolley Troubles (1917, Short)
- Lonesome Luke, Lawyer (1917, Short)
- Luke Wins Ye Ladye Faire (1917, Short)
- Lonesome Luke's Lively Life (1917, Short)
- Lonesome Luke on Tin Can Alley (1917, Short) as Cafe Waiter
- Lonesome Luke's Honeymoon (1917, Short)
- Lonesome Luke, Plumber (1917, Short)
- Stop! Luke! Listen! (1917, Short)
- Lonesome Luke, Messenger (1917, Short)
- Lonesome Luke, Mechanic (1917, Short)
- Lonesome Luke's Wild Women (1917, Short)
- Over the Fence (1917, Short) as Snitch, Another
- Lonesome Luke Loses Patients (1917, Short)
- Pinched (1917, Short) as Crook
- By the Sad Sea Waves (1917, Short) as Snub
- Birds of a Feather (1917, Short)
- Bliss (1917, Short) as Snub
- From Laramie to London (1917, Short)
- Rainbow Island (1917, Short) as Snub
- Love, Laughs and Lather (1917, Short)
- The Flirt (1917, Short) as Restaurant Owner
- Clubs Are Trump (1917, Short) as Snub
- All Aboard (1917, Short) as Passenger with trunk
- We Never Sleep (1917, Short)
- Move On (1917, Short)
- Bashful (1917, Short) as Snub the Butler
- The Big Idea (1917, Short) as Snub
- Step Lively (1917, Short)
- The Tip (1918, Short)
- The Lamb (1918, Short)
- Hit Him Again (1918, Short)
- Beat It (1918, Short)
- A Gasoline Wedding (1918, Short) as Snub
- Look Pleasant, Please (1918, Short) as Snub (as Harry Pollard)
- Here Come the Girls (1918, Short)
- Let's Go (1918, Short) as Man on beach
- On the Jump (1918, Short) as Snoopy Sam, The House Detective
- Follow the Crowd (1918, Short) as Snub
- Pipe the Whiskers (1918, Short)
- It's a Wild Life (1918, Short) as Snub
- Hey There! (1918, Short) as The New Director
- Kicked Out (1918, Short)
- The Non-Stop Kid (1918, Short) as Snub, the butler
- Two-Gun Gussie (1918, Short) as Snub
- Fireman Save My Child (1918, Short)
- The City Slicker (1918, Short) as Snub
- Sic 'Em, Towser (1918, Short)
- Somewhere in Turkey (1918, Short) as His Assistant
- Are Crooks Dishonest? (1918, Short) as Snub (as Harry Pollard)
- An Ozark Romance (1918, Short)
- Kicking the Germ Out of Germany (1918, Short)
- That's Him (1918, Short) as Robber
- Triple Trouble (1918, Short) as Flop House Tramp (uncredited)
- Bride and Gloom (1918, Short)
- Two Scrambled (1918, Short)
- Bees in His Bonnet (1918, Short)
- Swing Your Partners (1918, Short) as Boys' Neighbor
- Why Pick on Me? (1918, Short) as Harry Ham
- Nothing But Trouble (1918, Short) as Beach Voyeur
- Back to the Woods (1918, Short)
- Hear 'Em Rave (1918, Short)
- Take a Chance (1918, Short) as Simplex Joe (as Harry Pollard)
- She Loves Me Not (1918, Short)
- The Danger Game (1918, Short)
- Wanted – $5,000 (1919, Short)
- Going! Going! Gone! (1919, Short) as Snub
- Ask Father (1919, Short) as The Corn-Fed Secretary
- On the Fire, aka. The Chef (1919, Short) as The Assistant Chef
- I'm on My Way (1919, Short) as The Neighbor
- Look Out Below (1919, Short) as Snub
- The Dutiful Dub (1919, Short)
- Next Aisle Over (1919, Short) as The Henpecked Husband
- A Sammy in Siberia (1919, Short) as Count Pop-up-skyvitch, the Bolshevik Officer
- Just Dropped In (1919, Short)
- Young Mr. Jazz (1919, Short) as Snub (as Harry Pollard)
- Crack Your Heels (1919, Short) as Snub
- Ring Up the Curtain, aka. Back-Stage! (1919, Short) as The Leading Man
- Si, Senor (1919, Short)
- Before Breakfast (1919, Short)
- The Marathon (1919, Short) as Snub
- Pistols for Breakfast (1919, Short)
- Swat the Crook (1919, Short)
- Off the Trolley (1919, Short) as Streetcar Conductor
- Spring Fever (1919, Short) as The Unwelcome Suitor
- Billy Blazes, Esq. (1919, Short) as Sheriff 'Gun Shy' Gallagher
- Just Neighbors (1919, Short) as The Neighbor
- At the Old Stage Door (1919, Short)
- Never Touched Me (1919, Short) as Jealous Admirer
- A Jazzed Honeymoon (1919, Short)
- Count Your Change (1919, Short) as Billy Bullion
- Chop Suey & Co. (1919, Short)
- Heap Big Chief (1919, Short)
- Don't Shove (1919, Short) (uncredited)
- Be My Wife (1919, Short)
- The Rajah (1919, Short)
- He Leads, Others Follow (1919, Short)
- Soft Money (1919, Short)
- Count the Votes (1919, Short)
- Pay Your Dues (1919, Short)
- His Only Father (1919, Short)
- Bumping into Broadway (1919, Short) as Director of Musical Comedy
- Captain Kidd's Kids (1919, Short) as The Valet
- From Hand to Mouth (1919, Short) as The Kidnapper
- Call for Mr. Caveman (1919, Short) as Hatchet Face
- Looking for Trouble (1919, Short) as The Dandy
- All Lit Up (1920, Short) as The Dandy
- The Dippy Dentist (1920, Short) as The Dandy
- Raise the Rent (1920, Short) as Husband
- Fresh Paint (1920, Short) as Bicycle Messenger
- His Royal Slyness (1920, Short) as Prince of Roquefort
- Any Old Port (1920, Short) as Captain Dandy
- Run 'Em Ragged (1920, Short) as First Tramp
- Cash Customers (1920, Short) as The Chap
- Whirl o' the West (1921, Short) as Tenderfoot
- Rush Orders (1921, Short) as Marquis Marmalade
- It's a Gift (1923, Short) as Inventor Pollard
- All Wet (1926) as Snub
- The Yokel (1926, Short)
- The Doughboy (1926, Short)
- Double Trouble (1927, Short)
- Mitt the Prince (1927, Short) as Snub
- The Big Shot (1929, Short) as Snub
- Ex-Flame (1930) as Boggins
- The Road to Singapore (1931) as Photographer at Birthday Party (uncredited)
- The Strange Love of Molly Louvain (1932) as B.J. Pratt (uncredited)
- The Midnight Patrol (1932)
- Bars of Hate (1935) as Danny, the pickpocket
- Just My Luck (1936) as Frank Smith
- Riders of the Rockies (1937) as Pee Wee McDougal
- Tex Rides with the Boy Scouts (1937) as Pee Wee
- Hittin' the Trail (1937) as Bartender
- Special Agent K-7 (1937) as Waiter at Geller's Club
- Sing, Cowboy, Sing (1937) as Prisoner
- Nation Aflame (1937) as Edgar Wolfe
- Frontier Town (1938) as Peewee
- The Utah Trail (1938) as Pee Wee
- Hollywood Cavalcade (1939) as Keystone Kop
- Phony Express (1943) as Sheriff
- Bowery to Broadway (1944) as Lamb's Club Diner
- The Hoodlum Saint (1946) as Parade Spectator
- Miracle on 34th Street (1947) as Mail-bearing Court Officer
- Back Trail (1948) as Goofy
- Johnny Belinda (1948) as Juror (uncredited)
- Adam's Rib (1949) as Man in courtroom (uncredited)
- All About Eve (1950) (?)
- Singin' in the Rain (1952) as the Man receiving umbrella from Lockwood after the song "Singin' in the Rain" (uncredited)
- Limelight (1952) as Street Musician
- The Fast and the Furious (1954) as Park Caretaker
- Man of a Thousand Faces (1957) as Comedy Waiter
- Alfred Hitchcock Presents (1959) (Season 5 Episode 11: "Road Hog") as Bar Patron (uncredited)
- Alfred Hitchcock Presents (1960) (Season 6 Episode 7: "Outlaw in Town") as Bar Patron (uncredited)
- Heller in Pink Tights (1960) as Cheyenne Audience Member (uncredited)
- Twelve Hours to Kill (1960) as News Vendor at Train Depot (uncredited)
- Who Was That Lady? (1960) as Tattoo Artist (uncredited)
- Inherit the Wind (1960) as Townsman (uncredited)
- Studs Lonigan (1960) as Vendor (uncredited)
- Pepe (1960) as Sands Patron
- One-Eyed Jacks (1961) as Townsman (uncredited)
- Master of the World (1961) as Man at Balloon Society Meeting (uncredited)
- The Ladies Man (1961)
- Homicidal (1961) as Eddie the Bellhop (uncredited)
- The Errand Boy (1961) as 'Snub' (uncredited)
- Pocketful of Miracles (1961) as Knuckles (uncredited)
- Twist Around the Clock (1961) as Twist Dancer in Alpine Peaks (uncredited)
- The Man Who Shot Liberty Valance (1962) as Statehood Audience Member (uncredited)
