= The New York Peacock =

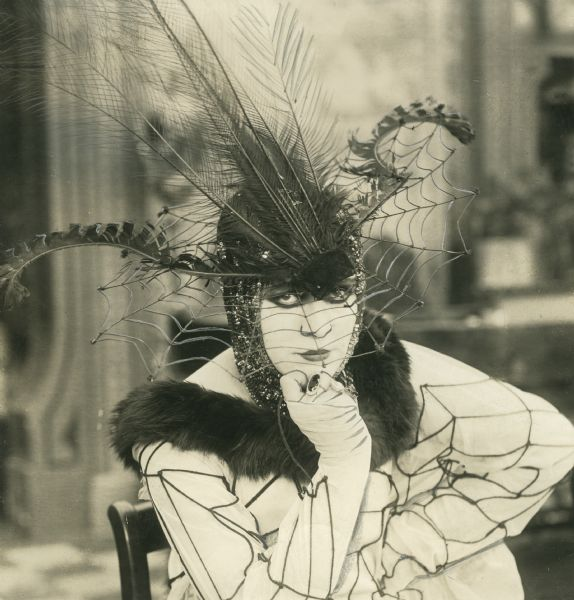
- Valeska Suratt as Zena the temptress
- Directed by: Kenean Buel
- Written by: Mary Murillo (scenario)
- Starring: Valeska Suratt
- Cinematography: Frank C. Kugler
- Distributed by: Fox Film Corporation
- Release date: February 5, 1917
- Running time: 5 or 6 reels
- Country: United States
- Language: Silent (English intertitles)

The New York Peacock is a 1917 American silent crime drama film directed by Kenean Buel. Distributed by Fox Film Corporation, the film starred Valeska Suratt. It is now considered lost.

== Cast ==
- Valeska Suratt as Zena
- Harry Hilliard as Billy Martin
- Eric Mayne as Mr. Martin
- Alice Gale as The Mother
- Claire Whitney as Billy's Wife
- William Black as Graham (credited as W.W. Black)
- John Mackin as Miller
- Frank Goldsmith as Durrant

== See also ==
- 1937 Fox vault fire
