= The Victim (1916 film) =

1916 film by Will S. Davis

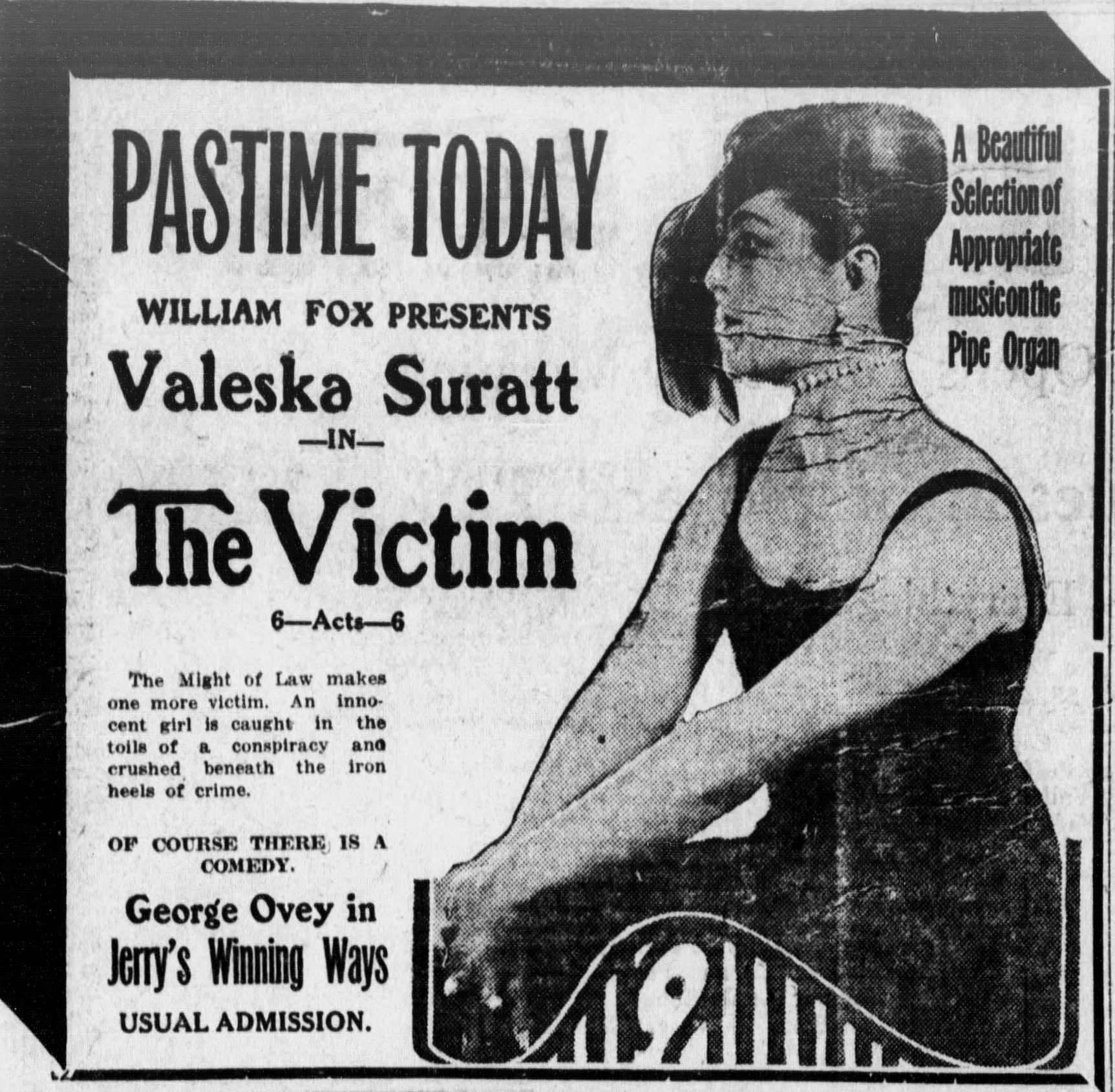
- Newspaper advertisement.
- Directed by: Will S. Davis
- Written by: Will S. Davis (scenario)
- Starring: Valeska Suratt
- Cinematography: A. Lloyd Lewis
- Distributed by: Fox Film Corporation
- Release date: December 25, 1916
- Running time: 5 reels
- Country: United States
- Language: Silent (English intertitles)

The Victim is a 1916 American silent drama film that was written and directed by Will S. Davis. The film starred Valeska Suratt and Herbert Heyes, and was distributed by Fox Film Corporation. All known copies of the film are believed to be lost in the 1937 Fox vault fire, which destroyed most of the company's silent films and other companies' film negatives.

== Plot ==
Ruth Merrill has been imprisoned for suspicions of being the accomplice of her father, Jim Merrill, and another man named Dugan in a safe blowing scheme that he was found guilty for. The group planned to tunnel their way to the bank, however they are all caught and arrested. The film then jumps forward a few years to when Ruth is released from prison. After being released on parole, Ruth is sent to live with Edna Boulden and her sweetheart Roy Barker. Edna and Roy both live with Edna's wealthy brother, Richard Boulden.

Despite her lack of finances, Ruth refuses to take money from Edna. Out of desperation, Ruth tries to steal money from a woman's purse, but changes her mind last second. The woman catches her and Ruth tries to run away, but ends up falling and spraining her ankle. Luckily, Dr. Boulden is driving by and brings her to his clinic. Dr. Boulden ends up falling for Ruth. Roy, however, has also fallen for Ruth. He tries flirting with Ruth, and when she rejects him he becomes more forceful. Edna catches them. Roy attempts to lie, but a servant tells Edna the truth.

Ruth and Dr. Boulden end up marrying. Around the same time, Jim Merrill escapes from prison. Detective Jack Higgins takes up the search. When he learns that Ruth has married a wealthy man, he decides to blackmail her for information about her father. Ruth complies with the detective and withdraws money from her bank account. While hiding from police, Jim Merrill enters the Boulden house. He flies into a rage when he sees the detective who imprisoned him is blackmailing his daughter.

When Ruth leaves the room to get the bank notes, her father attacks Detective Higgins. Higgins is killed in the ensuing scuffle, and Jim Merrill flees the scene. Ruth is later arrested for the murder, while her father takes refuge in an old barn. However, a careless man lighting a cigarette near the barn lights it on fire, and Jim Merrill is immediately operated on. The film ends with Jim Merrill explaining what really happened after his operation, and Ruth being freed from prison.

== Cast ==
- Valeska Suratt as Ruth Merrill
- Herbert Heyes as Dr. Boulden
- Claire Whitney as Edna Boulden
- John Charles as Jack Higgins
- Joseph Granby as Roy Barker
- Oscar Nye as Dugan
- Charles Edwards as Doc Burns

== See also ==
- 1937 Fox vault fire
