= Wife Number Two =

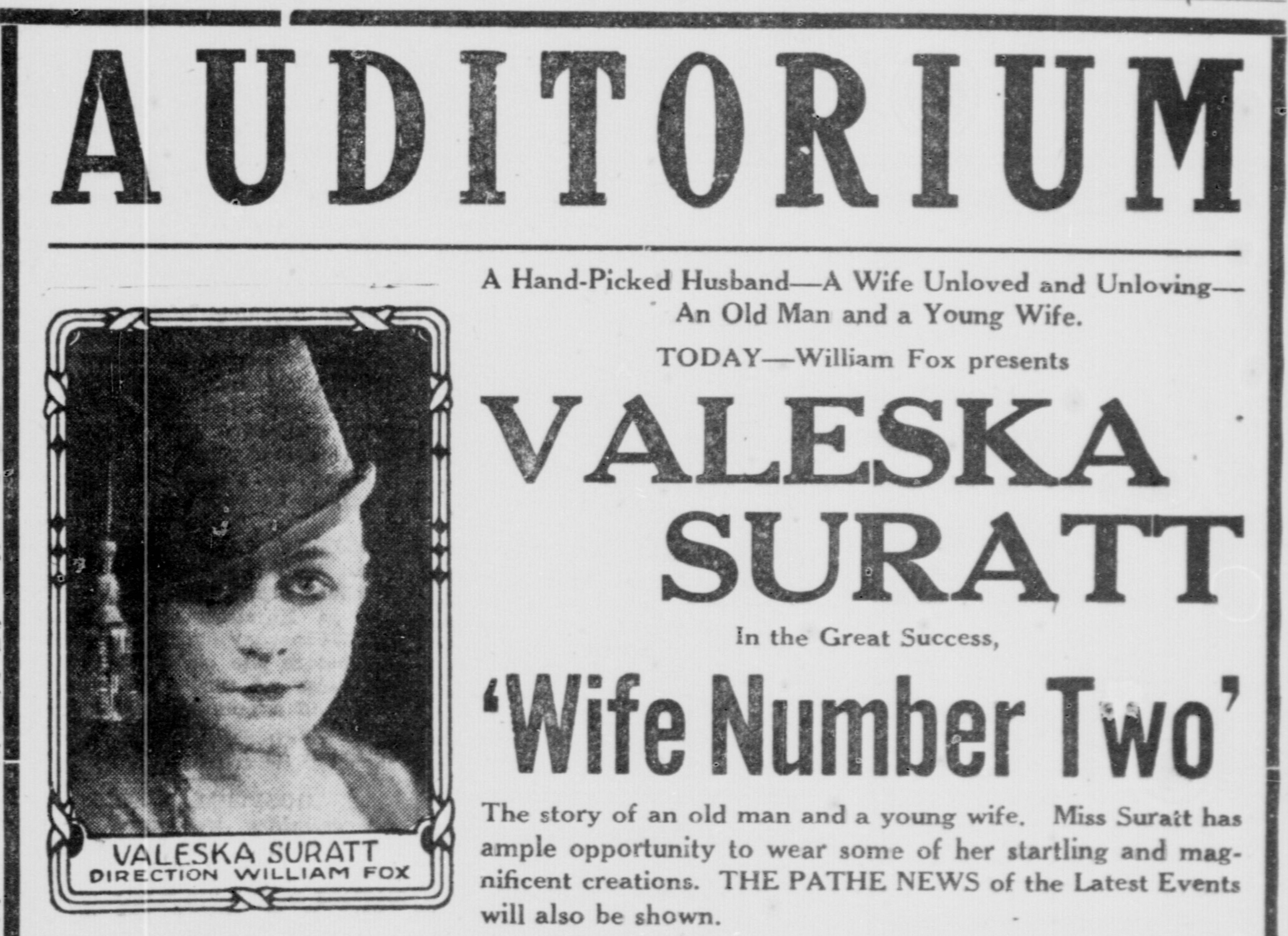
- Newspaper advertisement. *note; the adverts says William Fox himself directed the film
- Directed by: William Nigh
- Written by: William Nigh (scenario)
- Starring: Valeska Suratt
- Cinematography: Joseph Ruttenberg
- Distributed by: Fox Film Corporation
- Release date: July 29, 1917
- Country: United States
- Languages: Silent; English intertitles

Wife Number Two is a 1917 American silent drama film feature directed and written by William Nigh. The film starred Valeska Suratt, vamp rival to Theda Bara on the Fox lot, and was Suratt's penultimate silent film performance. The film is now considered lost.

== Cast ==
- Valeska Suratt - Emma Rolfe
- Eric Mayne - Dr. Charles Bovar
- Mathilde Brundage - His Mother
- John Goldworthy - Rudolph Bulwer
- Martin J. Faust - Philip
- T.J. Lawler - Leo
- Peter Lang - Lhereux
- Dan Mason - Old Soldier
- William Burton - Priest
- Dan Sullivan - Lhereux's Son
- L.F. Kennedy - Heminway

== See also ==
- 1937 Fox vault fire
