= The Vixen (film) =

1916 film directed by J. Gordon Edwards

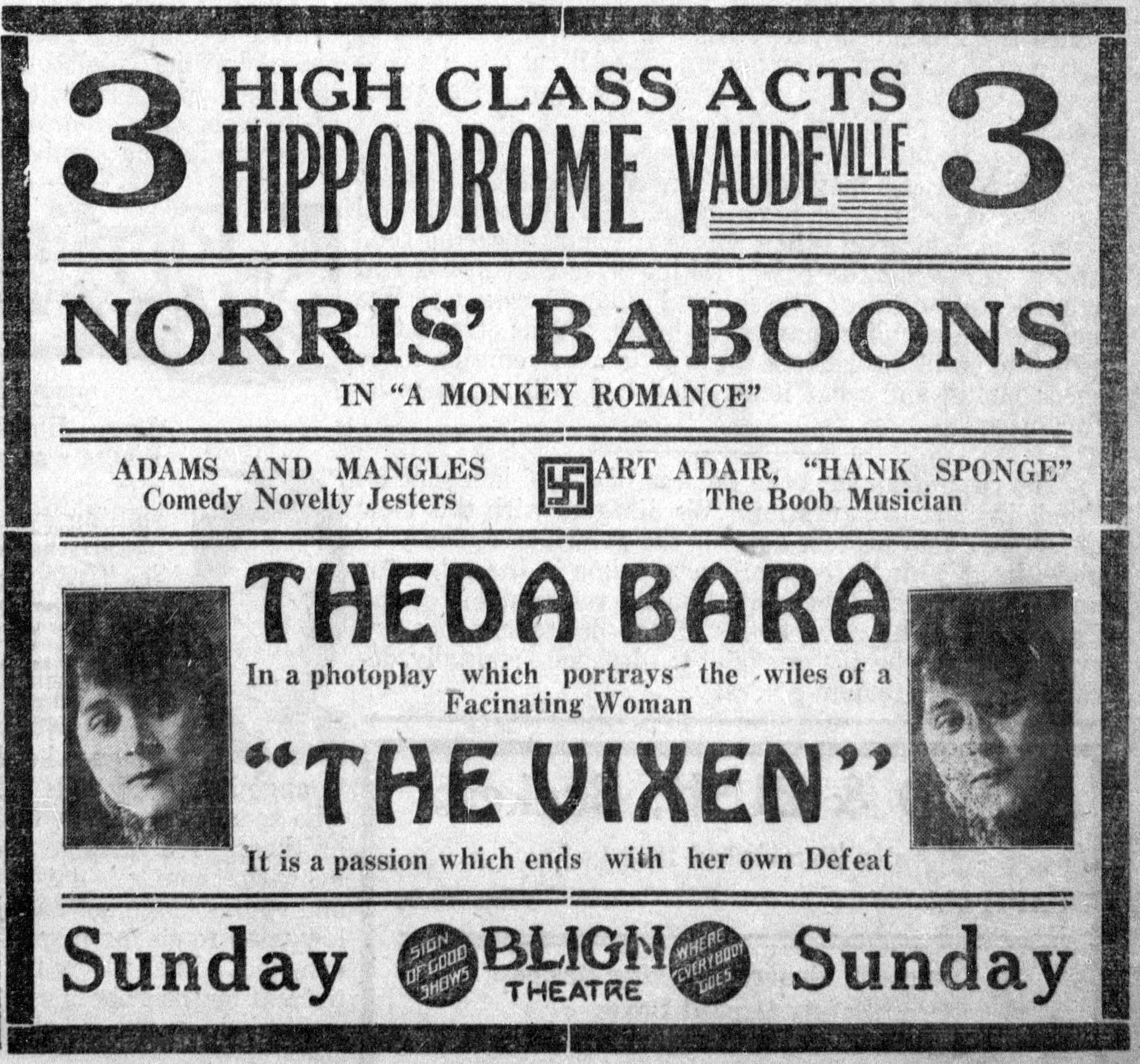
- Contemporary newspaper advertisement.
- Directed by: J. Gordon Edwards
- Written by: Mary Murillo
- Produced by: William Fox
- Starring: Theda Bara; Herbert Heyes
- Cinematography: Phil Rosen
- Distributed by: Fox Film Corporation
- Release date: December 3, 1916
- Running time: 60 minutes
- Country: United States
- Language: Silent (English intertitles)

The Vixen is a 1916 American silent drama film directed by J. Gordon Edwards and starring Theda Bara. This film was also titled The Love Pirate in the UK, and Il Pirata Dell'Amore in Italy. The film is now considered a lost film.

== Plot ==
Elsie Drummond (Theda Bara) is the spoiled daughter of an Admiral (George Clarke) who wanted much more than her father's position in society could offer. She didn't have the ability to meet men and socialize with them, but she thought of a way to lure them in once they were within her limited circle.

Admiral Drummond brought home a couple of men who were either young navy men with no money or old high-ranking men with a good salary. Elsie was looking for young, handsome and rich. After all, her father gave her everything materially she wanted. It was only natural she would want that and more.

According to Elsie's plans the ideal man had to be delivered to her first. Elsie's own sister, Helen (Mary G. Martin), was not spoiled like her. In fact, she was educated, worked and, while enjoying family life with her father and sister, wanted to make her own way in the world. Outgoing and trust worthy, she brought the occasional boyfriend Knowles (Herbert Heyes) into the house to introduce him to her family.

For Elsie, this was a great opportunity. She could lure in a loaded good-looking guy and marry him. At the end Helen convinces Knowles to take Elsie, once Knowles knew his wife was scheming to trade him for a richer man. It was Helen's goodness and strength that made him believe that, somehow, he and Elsie could have made it together.

== Cast ==
Theda Bara	Elsie Drummond
Herbert Heyes	Knowles Murray
Mary G. Martin	Helen Drummond
A. H. Van Buren	Martin Stevens
George Clarke	Admiral Drummond
Carl Gerard	Wooer
George Odell	Butler

== Brazil ==
The film was released in Brazil with title A Raposa on May 31, 1917 at Cine Ideal, situated on Rua da Carioca 60-62, Rio de Janeiro. It was also exhibited on Cines Capitolio, Império and Pathé for two months. Cine Pathé was a cinema located at Floriano square also called Cinelândia. Cine Ideal belonged to the group Severiano Ribeiro, which still holds on its storehouse old silent films. Other titles to be released in sequence:

Cinema	Date	Film	Leading	Enterprise
IDEAL	May 24, 1917	O Enigma da Máscara (Masks and Faces)	Johnston Forbes-Robertson	Ideal Film Company
IDEAL	May 31, 1917	A Raposa (The Vixen)	Theda Bara	Fox-Film
IDEAL	June 7, 1917	A Ilha dos Desejos (The Island of Desire)	George Walsh	Fox-Film
IDEAL	June 14, 1917	Dama de Copas (La donna di cuori)	Hesperia	Tiber Film

== See also ==
- List of lost films
- 1937 Fox vault fire
