= She (1917 film) =

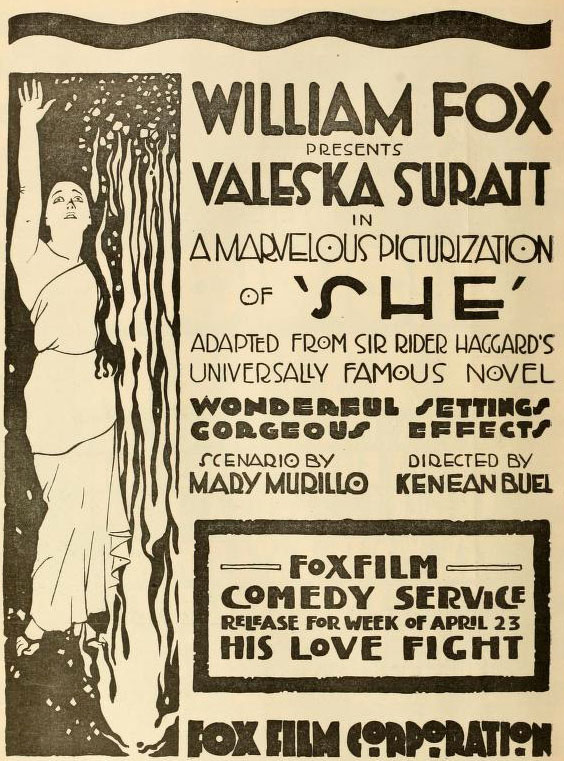
- Directed by: Kenean Buel
- Screenplay by: Mary Murillo
- Based on: She: A History of Adventure; 1887 novel by H. Rider Haggard
- Starring: Valeska Suratt; Ben Taggart
- Cinematography: Frank G. Kugler
- Distributed by: Fox Film Corporation
- Release date: April 14, 1917
- Running time: 5 reels
- Country: United States
- Language: Silent (English intertitles)

She is a 1917 American silent fantasy adventure drama film directed by Kenean Buel and produced and distributed by the Fox Film Corporation. It was loosely based on H. Rider Haggard's oft filmed 1887 best-selling novel, She: A History of Adventure. Now considered lost, the film starred Valeska Suratt and Ben Taggart.

== Cast ==
- Valeska Suratt as Ayesha, 'She'
- Ben Taggart as Leo Vincey
- Miriam Fouche as Ustane
- Thomas Wigney Persyval as Billali
- Tom Burrough as Horace Holly
- Martin Reagan as Job

== See also ==
- 1937 Fox vault fire
- List of Fox Film films
