= Thou Shalt Not Steal (film) =

1917 film

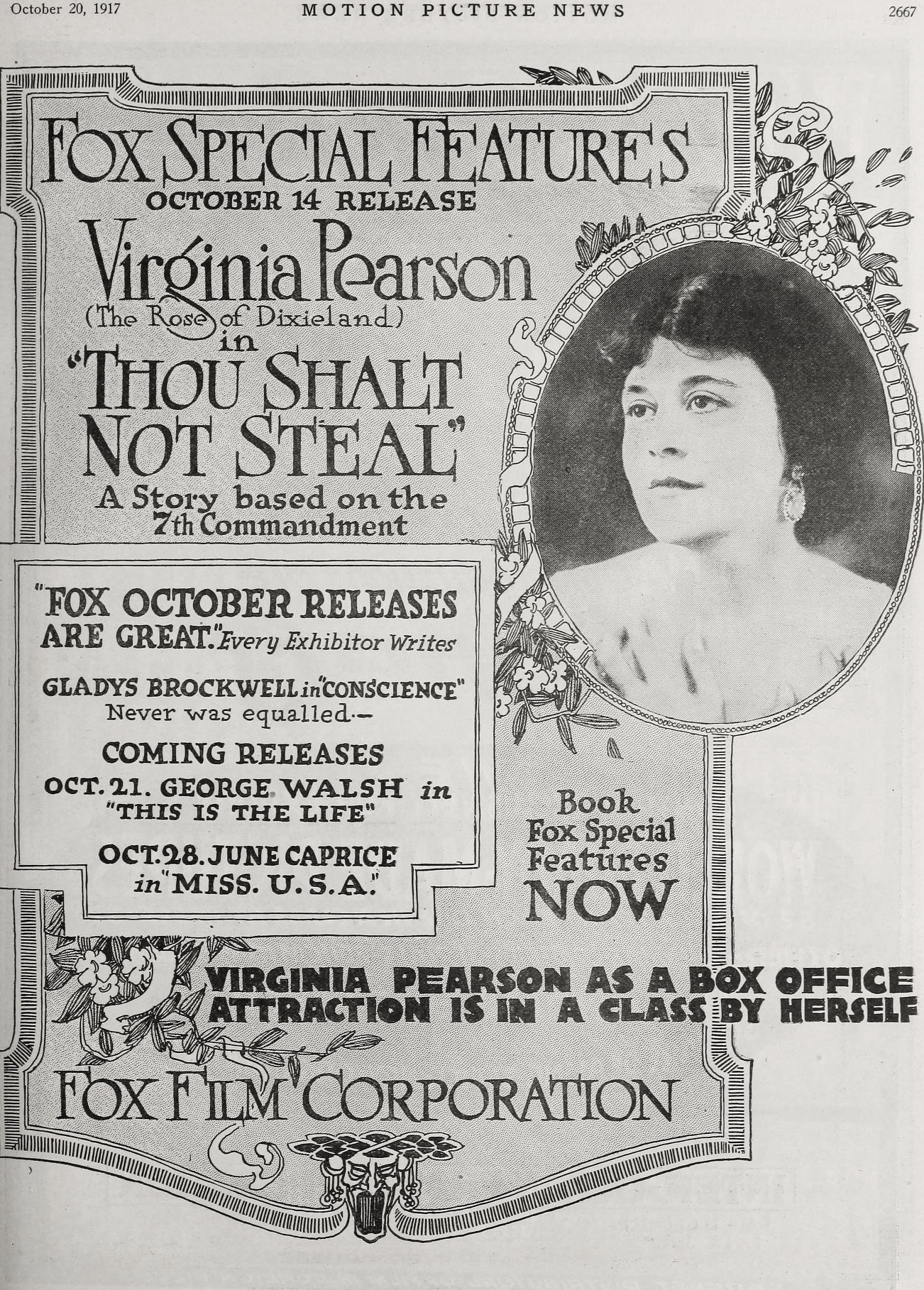
- Directed by: William Nigh
- Written by: Émile Gaboriau
- Starring: Virginia Pearson; Claire Whitney; Eric Mayne
- Cinematography: Joseph Ruttenberg
- Production company: Fox Film
- Distributed by: Fox Film
- Release date: October 14, 1917
- Running time: 50 minutes
- Country: United States
- Languages: Silent; English intertitles

Thou Shalt Not Steal is a lost 1917 American silent drama film directed by William Nigh and starring Virginia Pearson, Claire Whitney and Eric Mayne. It was based on the story Le Dossier n° 113 by Émile Gaboriau.

== Synopsis ==
An American woman comes under pressure to marry a British aristocrat to help out her financially-struggling father, although she really love's her father's secretary.

== Cast ==
- Virginia Pearson as Mary Bruce
- Claire Whitney as Madeleine
- Eric Mayne as Henry Bruce
- Mathilde Brundage as Mrs. Bruce
- John Goldsworthy as Lord Haverford
- Robert Elliott as Roger Benton
- Martin Faust as Paul Lechmere
- Lem F. Kennedy as Detective Farrell
- Danny Sullivan as The Reporter
- Mary Foy as Mrs. Jones
- Victor De Linsky as The Valet
- W.H. Burton as The Servant

== Preservation ==
With no holdings located in archives, Thou Shalt Not Steal is considered a lost film.

== Bibliography ==
- Solomon, Aubrey. The Fox Film Corporation, 1915-1935: A History and Filmography. McFarland, 2011.
