= Mary Murillo =

English actress and screenwriter

Mary Murrillo
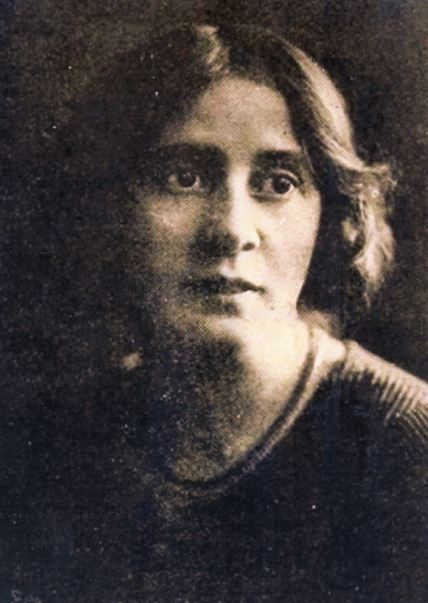
- Murrillo in 1918
- Born: Mary O'Connor; 22 January 1888; Bradford, England
- Died: 4 February 1944 (aged 56); Ickenham, England
- Occupations: Actress, screenwriter

Mary Murillo (born Mary O'Connor; 22 January 1888 – 4 February 1944) was an English actress, screenwriter, and businesswoman active during Hollywood's silent film era.

== Early life ==
Mary was the illegitimate daughter of Sarah Mary Peacock (née Sunter). In 1894, her mother married Edward O'Connor, a Roman Catholic Irish commercial traveller, and she was raised as Mary O'Connor. She was the eldest of four sisters (she also had an elder stepsister, Isabel Peacock, who later appeared in American films as Isabel Daintry). She was educated at St. Monica's in Skipton, Yorkshire, and at the Convent of the Sacred Heart School in Roehampton. She adopted the professional name Mary Murillo after being compared in looks to a Murillo painting of the Madonna.

== Career ==
In 1908, she traveled to America with her stepsister to start a stage career, and in February 1909, she made her debut in the chorus of the Broadway musical comedy Havana. She toured the United States, finding only small parts until 1913, when she started sending scenarios to film companies. Her first script to be accepted was bought by the husband-and-wife team of Phillips Smalley and Lois Weber. Other commissions followed, and the first film known to be credited to her is 1914's A Strand of Blond Hair, a Vitagraph comedy short starring John Bunny and Flora Finch.

She wrote five melodramas for Theda Bara during the 1910s popularity of vamp films. She also wrote for Bara's Fox rival, Valeska Suratt. Murillo served as screenwriter for Fox Film from 1916 to 1917, then joining Norma Talmadge Productions in 1919. She returned to the UK in 1923 to work for Stoll Film Studios. She wrote the script for the hit French sound film Accusée, levez-vous! (1930). In 1936, she formed the company Opticolor to market in Britain a French motion picture colour system, Francita, developed by her husband, Maurice Velle, son of French film pioneer Gaston Velle, but the business failed after a disastrous demonstration of the system. She later worked for J. Arthur Rank, 1st Baron Rank's Religious Films Ltd.

A selection of films made by Murillo, Maurice Velle, and Gaston Velle was featured at Il Cinema Ritrovato film festival in Bologna in 2015.

== Filmography ==
- A Strand of Blond Hair (1914)
- Mavis of the Glen (1915)
- The Little Gypsy (1915)
- The Unfaithful Wife (1915)
- A Soldier's Oath (1915)
- The Green-Eyed Monster (1916)
- A Parisian Romance (1916)
- Gold and the Woman (1916)
- Blazing Love (1916)
- The Eternal Sapho (1916)
- Sins of Men (1916)
- East Lynne (1916)
- Ambition (1916)
- The Unwelcome Mother (1916)
- Her Double Life (1916)
- The War Bride's Secret (1916)
- Love and Hate (1916)
- The Vixen (1916)
- The Bitter Truth (1917)
- Love Aflame (1917)
- The New York Peacock (1917)
- Sister Against Sister (1917)
- Love's Law (1917)
- Tangled Lives (1917)
- She (1917)
- Two Little Imps (1917)
- Jack and the Beanstalk (1917)
- Wrath of Love (1917)
- Outwitted (1917)
- The Eternal Mother (1917)
- The Secret of the Storm Country (1917)
- The Avenging Trail (1917)
- Cheating the Public (1918)
- The Reason Why (1918)
- Her Only Way (1918)
- The Forbidden City (1918)
- The Panther Woman (1918)
- The Heart of Wetona (1919)
- The Other Man's Wife (1919)
- Mothers of Men (1920)
- Yes or No (1920)
- The Wonderful Chance (1920)
- The New York Idea (1920)
- The Passion Flower (1921)
- The Sign on the Door (1921)
- Perjury (1921)
- Shams of Society (1921)
- Moonshine Valley (1922)
- The Sins Ye Do (1924)
- The Princess and the Clown (1924)
- Forbidden Cargoes (1925)
- A Woman Redeemed (1927)
- King's Mate (1928)
- Mon gosse de père (1930)
- Accused, Stand Up! (1930)
- My Old Dutch (1934)
