= The Soul of Broadway =

1915 film by Herbert Brenon

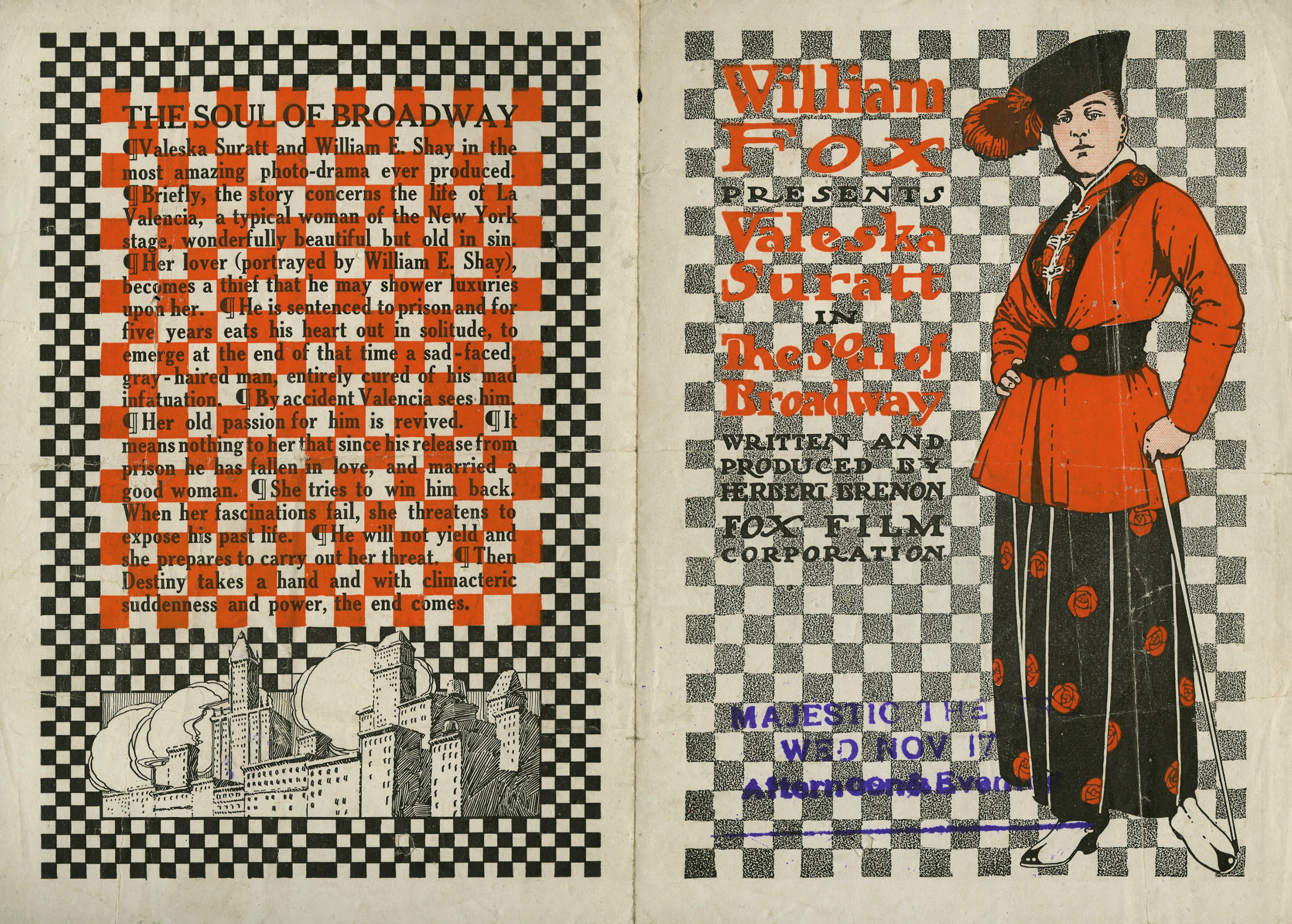
- Pamphlet
- Directed by: Herbert Brenon
- Written by: Herbert Brenon (scenario)
- Story by: Herbert Brenon
- Starring: Valeska Suratt
- Cinematography: Phil Rosen
- Distributed by: Fox Film Corporation
- Release dates: October 18, 1915 (U.S.); February 9, 1919 (Re-release)
- Country: United States
- Language: Silent (English intertitles)

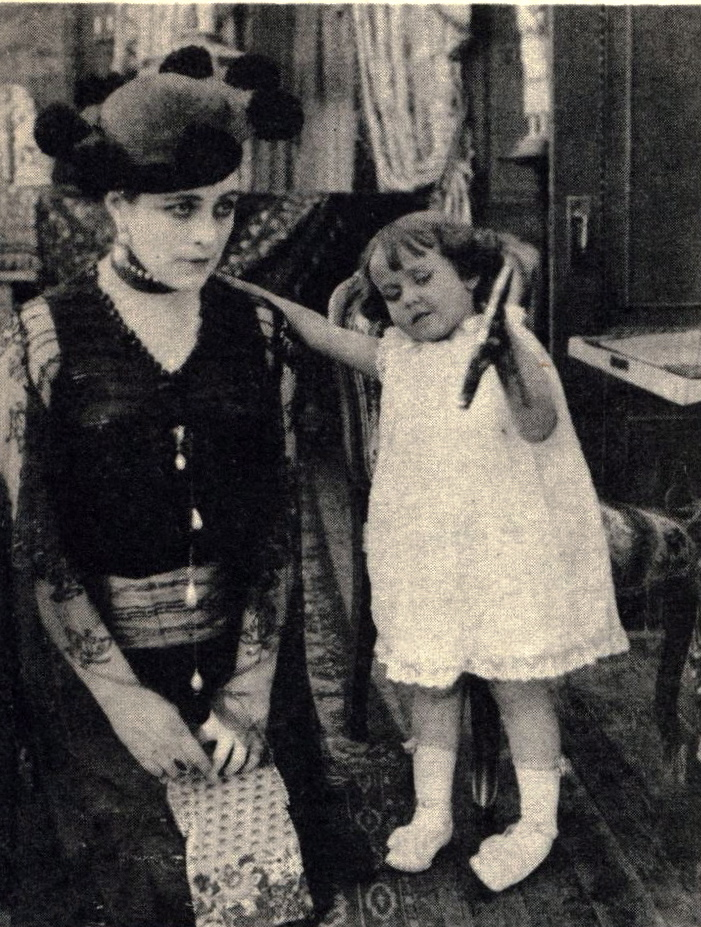
Valeska Suratt and Jane Lee on set

The Soul of Broadway is a 1915 American silent crime drama film produced and distributed by the Fox Film Corporation and directed by Herbert Brenon. Popular vaudeville performer Valeska Suratt starred in the film which was also her silent screen debut. The Soul of Broadway is now considered lost. It is one of many silent films that were destroyed in a fire at Fox's film storage facility in Little Ferry, New Jersey in July 1937.

== Plot ==
As described in a film magazine, La Valencia, a stage beauty, has ensnared a young man who steals in order to shower her with the luxuries that she demands. He is caught and, after serving a 5-year term, emerges from prison a gray haired man. La Valencia comes across him again, and her passion revives. She seeks to ensnare him again, but now he is married and his old life has no charms for him. Desperate, she then threatens to reveal his past to his wife, which leads to a terrific climax.

== Cast ==
- Valeska Suratt as Grace Leonard / "La Valencia"
- William E. Shay as William Craig
- Mabel Allen as June Meredith
- Sheridan Block as Frederick Meredith
- George W. Middleton as Monty Wallace
- Jane Lee as Grace's Daughter
- Gertrude Berkeley as Stage Actress (*she was the mother of Busby Berkeley)

== See also ==
- List of Fox Film films
- 1937 Fox vault fire
