= Joseph Granby =

American actor (1885–1965)

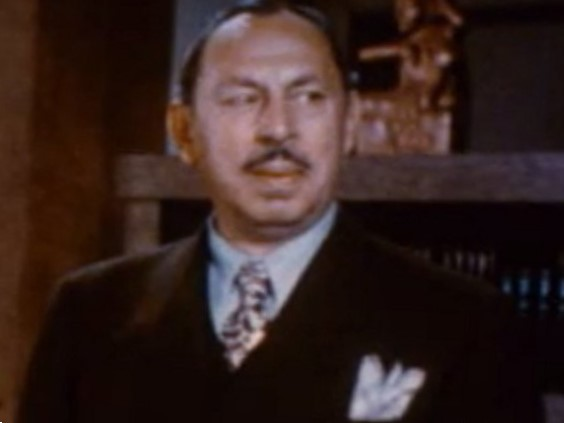
- Joseph Granby, Here Comes Trouble, 1948
- Born: March 24, 1885; Boston, Massachusetts, U.S.
- Died: September 22, 1965 (aged 80); Los Angeles, California, U.S.
- Other name: Joe Granby
- Occupation: Actor
- Years active: 1911–1965

Joseph Granby (March 24, 1885 – September 22, 1965) was an American film actor whose career spanned from 1915 to the 1960s.

Born in Boston he started in movies in 1915, mostly shorts, acting for Universal, its predecessor Independent Motion Picture Company, Rex, Victor and others and appeared at Fox Studios supporting Valeska Suratt in her vamp-style films. His final silent film was in 1921 and for the rest of the 1920s and 1930s appeared in Broadway plays (begun in 1911).

When he returned to motion pictures in 1943, his appearances were uncredited. His final years saw work in television shows and movies. Granby is perhaps best remembered today as the voice of the Angel Joseph in the classic holiday film It's a Wonderful Life.

He died September 22, 1965.

== Filmography ==
- His New Automobile (1915) *short
- The Haunted Bell (1916) as Professor Nassaib Haig *short
- The Capital Prize (1916) as Baron Rezek *short
- The Man from Nowhere (1916) as Dorenzo
- The Crystal's Warning (1916) as The Secretary of State *short
- Temptation and the Man (1916) as Phil Johnson
- Achenbrodel (1916) as Melikoff *short
- The Lie Sublime (1916) as Pietro Bonelli *short
- The Mantle of Deceit (1916) as Albert Kruger *short
- Jealousy (1916) as Randolph Parsons
- Ashes (1916) as Harry Davis *short
- It Didn't Work Out Right (1916) as Harry de Puyster
- The Victim (1916) as Roy Barker
- The Accomplice (1917) as Antonio
- Rasputin, the Black Monk (1917) as Mikula Dvorkin-leader of the Duma
- The Awakening (1917) as Prosper Chavassier
- Peck's Bad Girl (1918) as Walker
- The Great Romance (1919) as Prince Boris
- A Proxy Husband (1919) *short
- The Imp (1919) as Hampden
- Black Is White (1920) as Ranjab
- Chain of Evidence (1920) as James Stewart
- Diane of Star Hollow (1921) as Pietro
- The Cross of Lorraine (1943) *uncredited
- Kismet (1944) as Policeman *uncredited
- And Now Tomorrow (1944) a Patient *uncredited
- The Great Flamarion (1945) as Detective Ramirez *uncredited
- The Phantom Speaks (1945) as Attorney James J. Kennerly *uncredited
- Danny Boy (1945) as Lafe Bunkell the Orange Man
- O.S.S. (1946) as Engineer *uncredited
- Her Adventurous Night (1946) as Mr. Glitter *uncredited
- The Stranger (1946) *uncredited
- The Return of Monte Cristo (1946) as Footman *uncredited
- It's a Wonderful Life (1946) as Joseph, an angel *voice only, uncredited
- I'll Be Yours (1947) as Businessman *uncredited
- Monsieur Verdoux (1947) as Bailiff *uncredited
- Magic Town (1947) as Reporter *uncredited
- The Lady from Shanghai (1947) as Police Lieutenant *uncredited
- Here Comes Trouble (1948) as Spinelli, Rankin's Lawyer *uncredited
- Kiss the Blood Off My Hands (1948) as Theatre Manager *uncredited
- Joan of Arc (1948) as Giles de Fecamp *uncredited
- Let's Live a Little (1948) as Newcomb *uncredited
- Every Girl Should Be Married (1948) as Louis the Barber "uncredited
- Siren of Atlantis (1949) as Expert
- The Barkleys of Broadway (1949) as Duke de Morny *uncredited
- Amazon Quest (1949) as Mariano
- Special Agent (1949) as Sheriff Dodson *uncredited
- Silver Butte (1949) as Don Hernandez *short
- Free for All (1949) as Stranger *uncredited
- Where the Sidewalk Ends (1950) as Fat Man *uncredited
- Redwood Forest Trail (1950) as Bart Bryant
- Belle Le Grand (1951) as Mark Hendrick *uncredited
- His Kind of Woman (1951) as Arnold *uncredited
- The Greatest Show on Earth as Spectator *uncredited
- Viva Zapata! (1952) ? *uncredited
- Invasion, U.S.A. (1952) as President of the U.S.A. *uncredited
- Fort Algiers (1953) ? *uncredited
- Written on the Wind (1956) as R.J. Courtney
- The Tattered Dress (1957) as Second Jury Foreman *uncredited

== Television ==
- Hollywood Theatre Time (1951) as Landlord (1 episode)
- The Cisco Kid (1951) as Jim Turner/The Judge/Will Harper (3 episodes)
- Front Page Detective (1951) ? (1 episode)
- The Cases of Eddie Drake (1952) as Henry Woodside (1 episode)
- Fireside Theatre (1951-1954) ? (4 episodes)
- Adventures of the Falcon (1954) as Emilio Rojas (1 episode)
- The Star and the Story (1955) as Father Martial (1 episode)
- Sergeant Preston of the Yukon (1955) as Omiak (1 episode)
- Lux Video Theatre (1954-1955) as Dr. Boyd/Mortician/Reece (3 episodes)
- Tales of the 77th Bengal Lancers (1957) as Chand Bahadur (1 episode)
- The Court of Last Resort (1958) as Mr. Mitchell (1 episode)
- The Loretta Young Show (1959) as Jagan Lal (1 episode)
- This Man Dawson (1960) as ? (1 episode)
