= The Straight Way =

1916 film by Will S. Davis

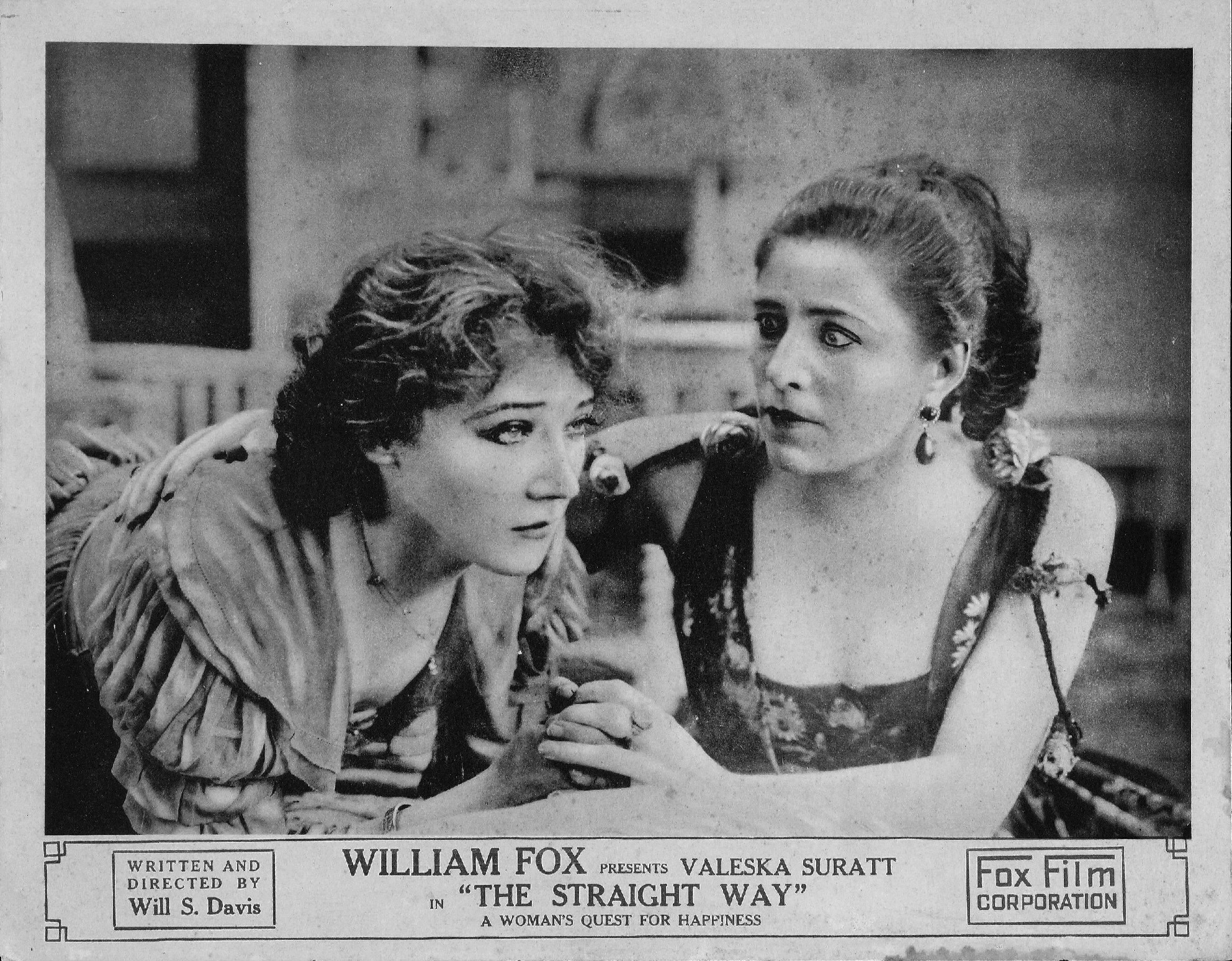
- Lobby card: Claire Whitney and Valeska Suratt
- Directed by: Will S. Davis
- Written by: Will S. Davis (scenario)
- Produced by: William Fox
- Starring: Valeska Suratt
- Cinematography: A. Lloyd Lewis
- Distributed by: Fox Film Corporation
- Release date: December 18, 1916
- Running time: 50 minutes
- Country: United States
- Language: Silent (English intertitles)

The Straight Way is a 1916 American silent drama film written and directed by Will S. Davis. The film starred Valeska Suratt and was distributed by the Fox Film Corporation. The Straight Way is now considered lost.

== Cast ==
- Valeska Suratt as Mary Madison
- Herbert Heyes as John Madison
- Glen White as Dan Walters
- Claire Whitney as Nell Madison
- Elsie Balfour as Marion Madison
- Richard Turner as Sullivan
- Richard Rendell as Carey
- Fred Jones as Burton
- T. Tamamoto as Valet

== See also ==
- 1937 Fox vault fire
