= Billy Gould (comedian) =

American comedian (1869–1950)

William J. Flannery (May 1, 1869 – February 1, 1950) was an American comedian and minstrel show performer. He also sang in operettas and musical comedies. He was a member of the National Variety Artists. He went by the stage name of Billy Gould.

== Biography ==
Flamnery was born on May 1, 1869, in New York City. His parents were migrants from Ireland. He made his stage debut at age 15 in 1884 in Billy Emerson's Minstrels in San Francisco, California. In New York City he played in comedies with Fay Templeton, Kate Castelton, and Verna Jarbeau. He appeared in The Belle of New York in 1897 as Count Patsi Rattatoo. He appeared in Pretty Mrs. Smith in 1914. He then appeared in The New Yorkers.

He married Nellie Marietta Burt on March 24, 1889, in Hurley, Wisconsin, and they formed an act. Their act consisted of flirtatious dialogue.

Early in his career, Gould performed with the Charles Red organization and the Emerson Minstrels in San Francisco. He was known as a singer, performing what a 1910 newspaper article described as "English character songs".

Gould was active in vaudeville, having a single act until he discovered actress Valeska Surratt, whom he married in 1904. They joined forces to form "William Gould and Valeska Surratt", a partnership act that performed across the United States and in England and South Africa. They created an act where she performed exotic dances, including the Apache dance. They divorced in 1911 and she married Fletcher Norton.

Gould then teamed up with Ashley to form Gould and Ashley.

He died in New York City on February 1, 1950, aged 80.

== Broadway ==
- The Belle of New York (1897) as Count Patsi Rattatoo
- Pretty Mrs. Smith (1914)
- The New Yorkers
