= The Slave (1917 drama film) =

1917 American film

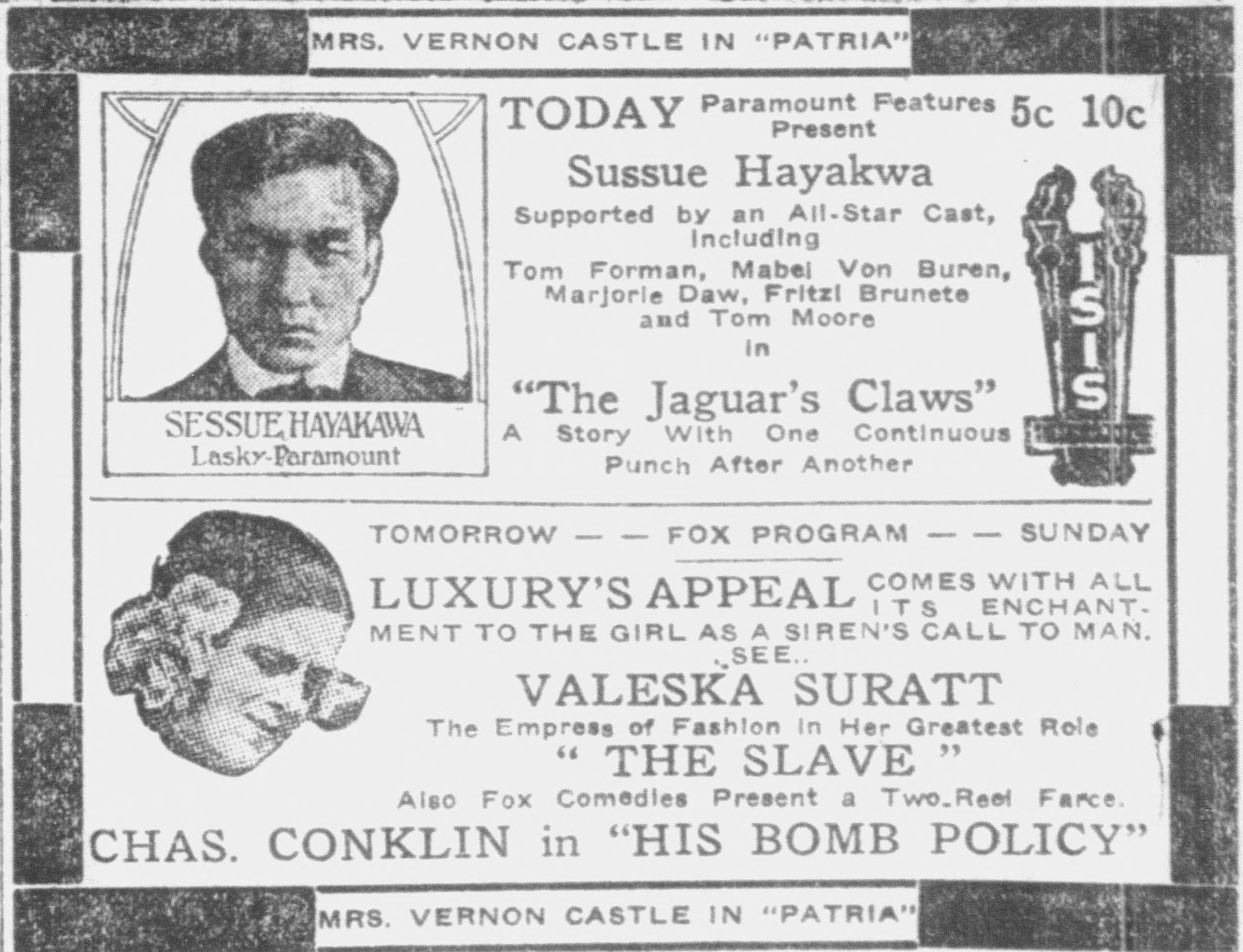
- A contemporary advertisement for The Slave (bottom) along with an advertisement for The Jaguar's Claws (top)
- Directed by: William Nigh
- Written by: William Nigh (scenario)
- Starring: Valeska Suratt
- Cinematography: Joseph Ruttenberg
- Distributed by: Fox Film Corporation
- Release date: June 3, 1917
- Running time: 5 reels
- Country: United States
- Language: Silent (English intertitles)

The Slave is a 1917 American silent drama film written and directed by William Nigh. The film starred Valeska Surratt. It is now considered lost.

== Plot ==
Caroline works at a hair salon. A wealthy man proposes to her, and she dreams she marries a man who turns out to be miserly and locks her in his mansion. When he dies, Caroline enjoys his fortune at first, but eventually comes to her senses. She wakes up, declines the proposal, and decides to wait for her honest young man to return to her.

== Cast ==
- Valeska Suratt as Caroline
- Violet Palmer as Dulce
- Eric Mayne as Dr. Atwell
- Herbert Heyes as David Atwell
- Edward Burns as Egbert Atwell
- Edwin Roseman as Dr. Ghoul
- Dan Mason as the fossil
- Tom Brooke as Professor Winther
- Martin Faust as author
- Martin Hunt
