= Will S. Davis =

American film director

William Senderling Davis
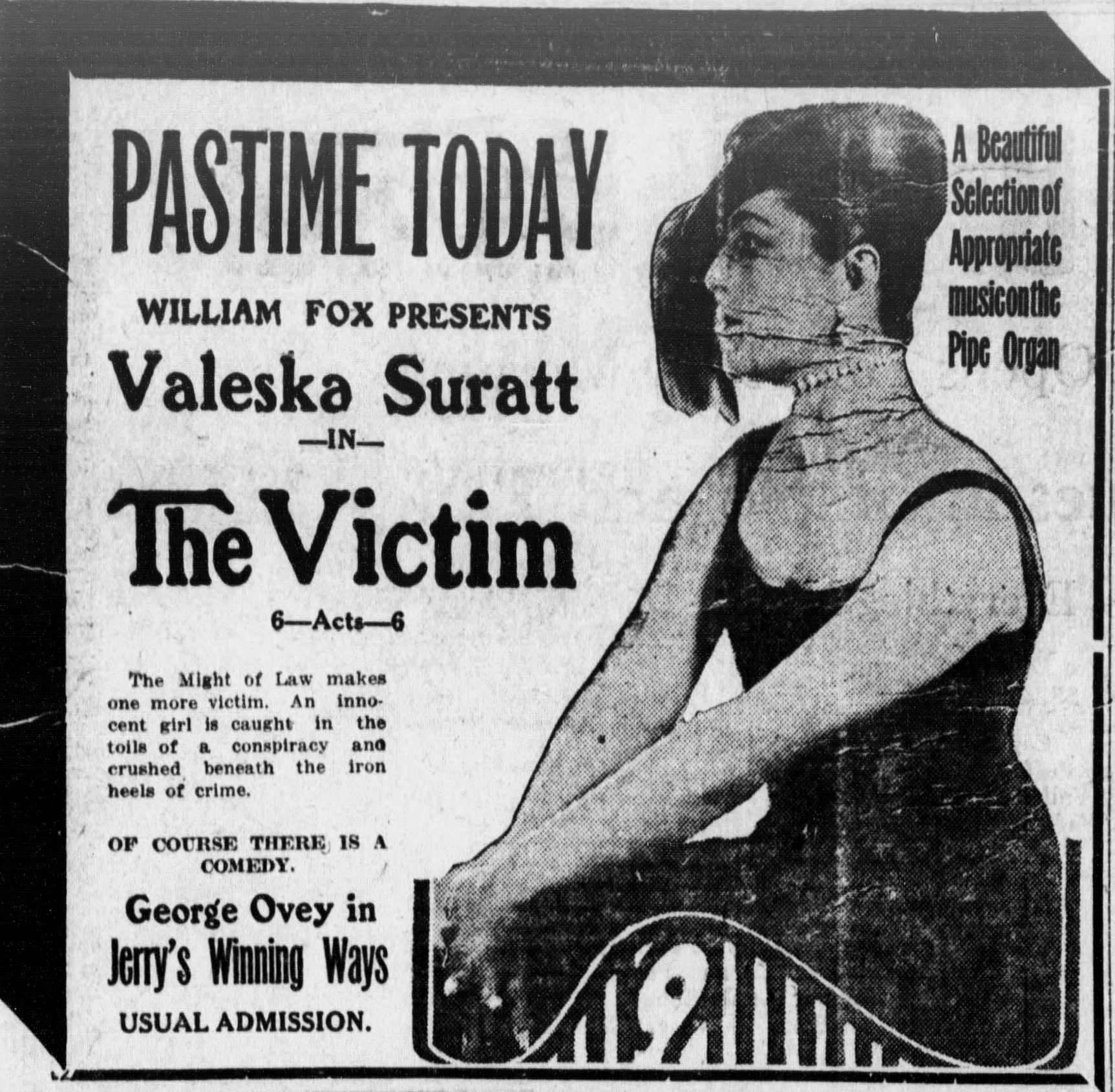
- Born: November 22, 1880; Philadelphia, Pennsylvania
- Died: November 19, 1920 (aged 39); Manhattan, New York City
- Occupations: Film director Screenwriter
- Years active: 1913-1920

William Senderling Davis (November 22, 1880 – November 19, 1920) was an American film director and screenwriter of the silent era. He was the son of David Jackson Davis and Elizabeth Ann Tees. He directed 36 films between 1913 and 1920. He also wrote for 13 films between 1914 and 1917. Prior to his involvement in motion pictures, Davis also had training as a stage actor on Broadway amongst elsewhere.

== Selected filmography ==
- Destruction (1915)
- The Curious Conduct of Judge Legarde (1915)
- A Modern Magdalen (1915)
- Slander (1916)
- The Fool's Revenge (1916)
- The Straight Way (1916)
- Jealousy (1916)
- The Victim (1916)
- Alias Mrs. Jessop (1917)
- Under Suspicion (1918)
- The Brass Check (1918)
- No Man's Land (1918)
- With Neatness and Dispatch (1918)
- In Judgement Of (1918)
- The Eternal Mother (1920)
- The Mystery Mind (1920)
