= Jealousy (1916 film) =

1916 silent drama film by Will S. Davis

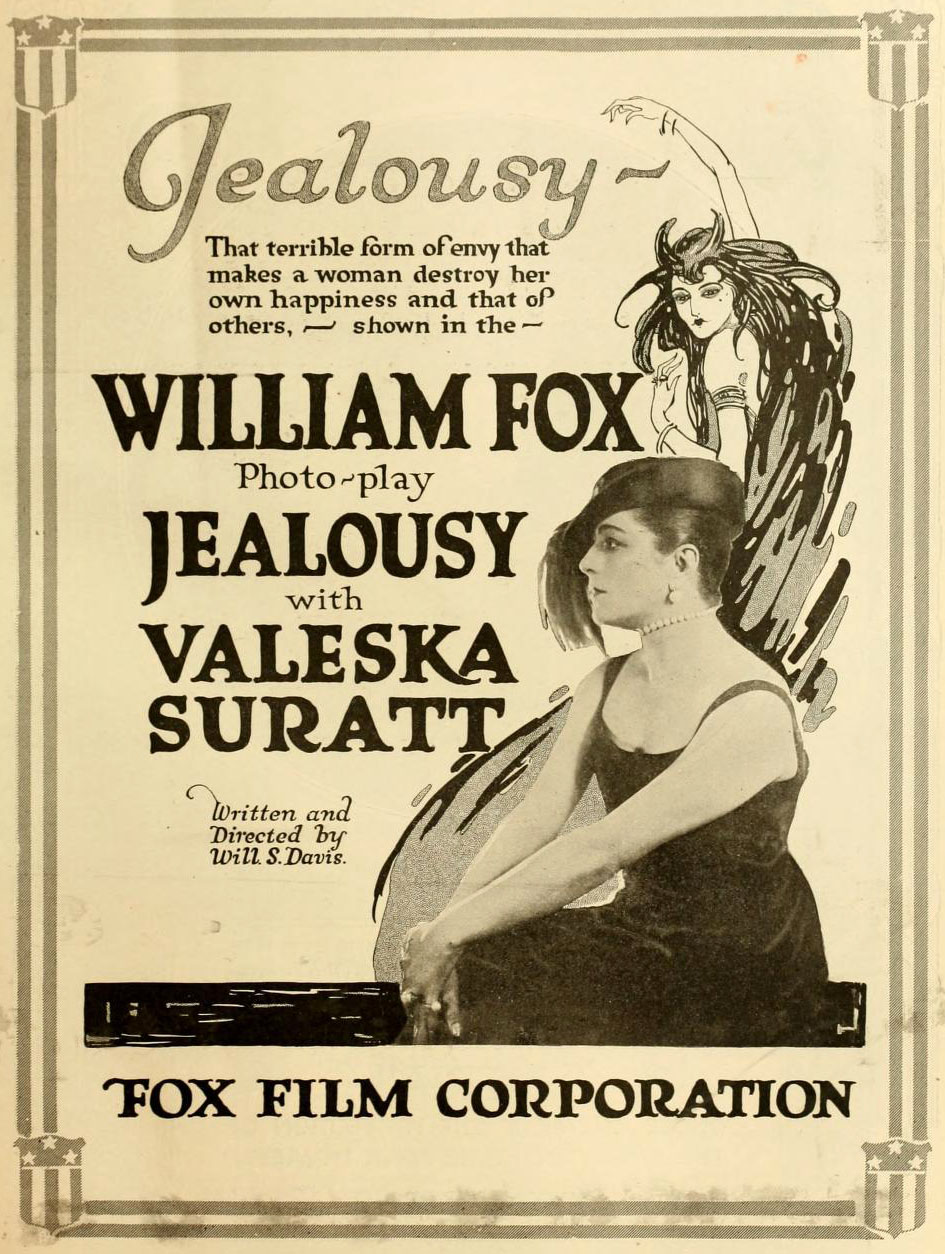
- Lobby poster with Valeska Suratt and Claire Whitney as a sorceress in the background
- Directed by: Will S. Davis
- Written by: Will S. Davis (scenario)
- Starring: Valeska Suratt
- Distributed by: Fox Film Corporation
- Release date: November 20, 1916
- Running time: 5 reels
- Country: United States
- Language: Silent (English intertitles)

Jealousy is a 1916 American silent drama film written and directed by Will S. Davis. The film starred Valeska Suratt in another popular vamp role. The film is now considered lost.

== Cast ==
- Valeska Suratt as Anne Baxter
- Lew Walter as Peter Martin
- Charline Mayfield as Agnes Maynard
- Curtis Benton as Roland Carney
- Joseph Granby as Randolph Parsons
- George M. Adams as George Baxter
- John Charles (uncredited)
- Herbert Heyes (uncredited)
- Claire Whitney (uncredited)
