= Heart of the Sunset =

1918 film

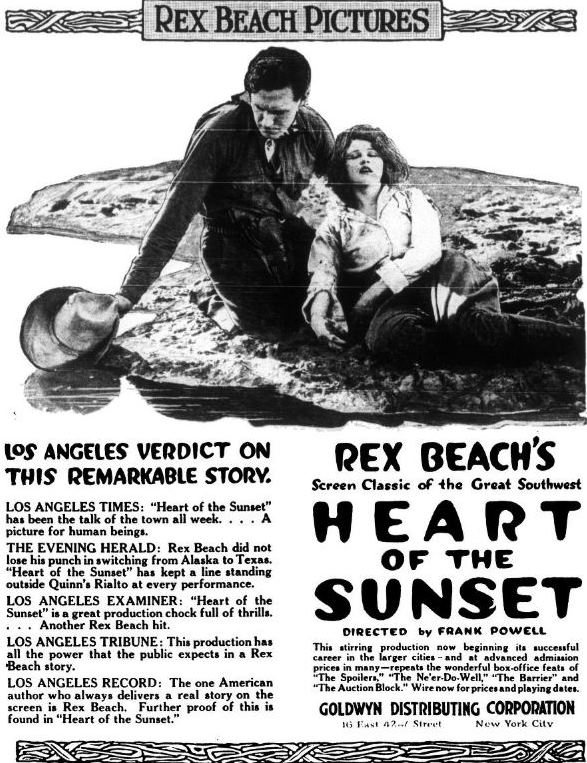
- Advertisement for the film
- Directed by: Frank Powell
- Written by: Frederic Chapin (adapt); Rex Beach (titles)
- Starring: Anna Q. Nilsson; Herbert Heyes; Robert Taber
- Cinematography: William Fildew
- Production company: Rex Beach Pictures
- Distributed by: Goldwyn Distributing
- Release date: March 1918 (US)
- Running time: 7 reels
- Country: United States
- Languages: Silent; English intertitles

Heart of the Sunset is a 1918 American silent Western film starring Anna Q. Nilsson and Herbert Heyes. It was written by Rex Beach and directed by Frank Powell. It was produced by Rex Beach Pictures Company and filmed in Corpus Christi, Texas.

== Cast ==
- Anna Q. Nilsson as Alaire Austin
- Herbert Heyes as Dave Law
- Robert Taber as Ed Austin
- E. L. Fernandez as Longorio
- Jane Miller as Rosa
- William Frederic as Blaze Jones
- Irene Boyle as Paloma
- Leon De La Mothe as Leon Kent
- Patrick Sylvester McGeeney as P. S. McGeeney
- Hector V. Sarno as Hector Sarno
- Lule Warrenton as Lulu Warrenton
- Ray Chambelin
- George Murdock
- Arthur Tavares
