= May de Sousa =

American actress and singer

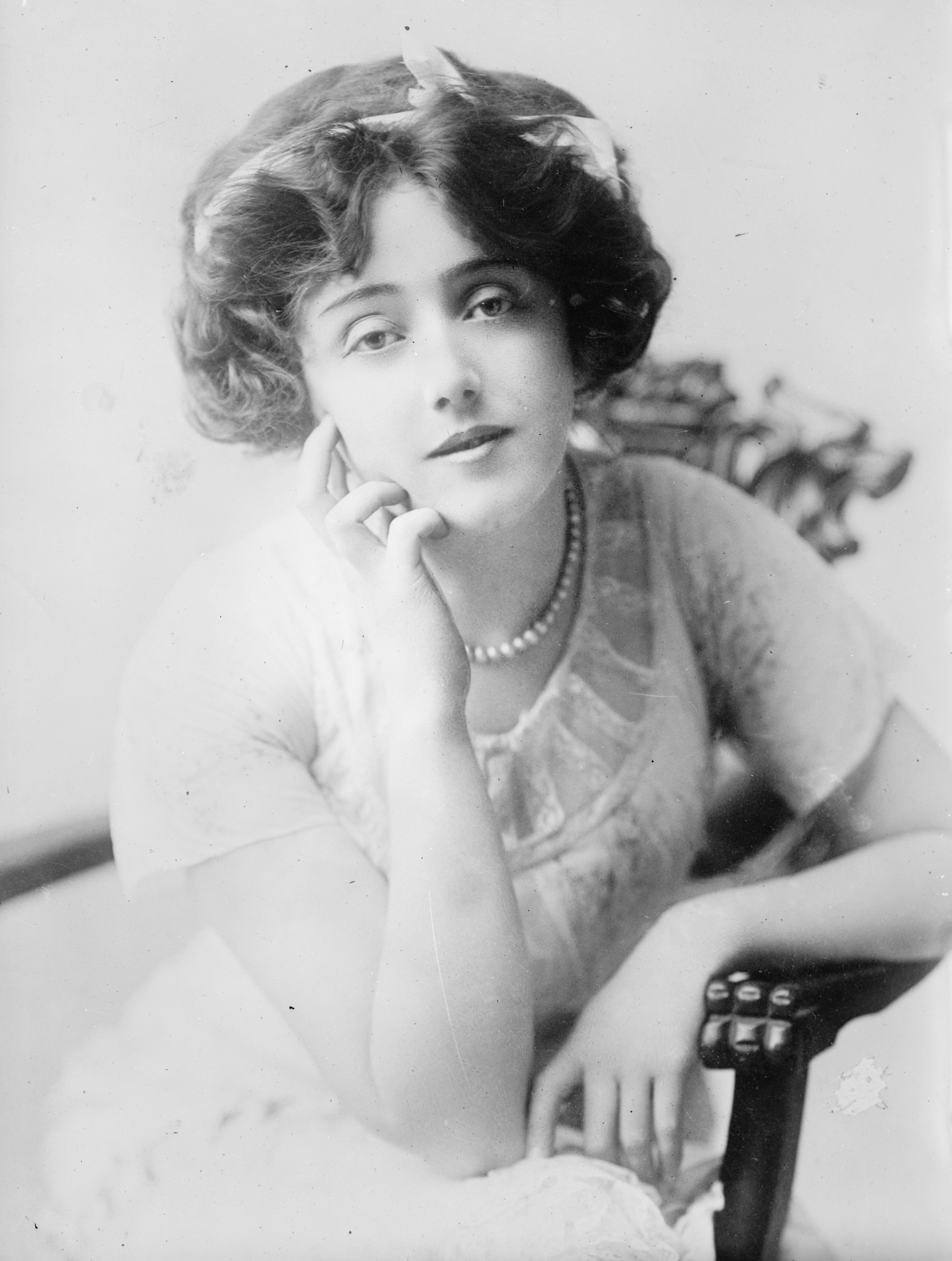
- Sousa c. 1915
- Born: May Alvos de Sousa; November 6, 1884; Chicago, Illinois, U.S.
- Died: August 8, 1948 (aged 63); Chicago, U.S.
- Occupations: Actress, singer
- Years active: 1898–1918
- Spouses: Eaton Arthur Haines (m. 1910; div. 1914); William E. O'Hara (m. 1919; died 1941)

May Alvos de Sousa (November 6, 1884 – August 8, 1948) was an American singer and a Broadway actress.

== Biography ==
De Sousa was the daughter of a Chicago police detective, John De Sousa (born 1856 died 1941), and his wife, Bridget Caroline (Carrie) Walsh (1861—1910). She had a younger sibling, Marvin De Sousa (1891—1921).

She came to fame in 1898 as the singer of "Dear Midnight of Love", a ballad by Bathhouse John Coughlin.

May attracted such attention that at end of her first full season in 1901, whilst still only a teenager, she was engaged by Frank L. Perley as one of the principals for his touring company for the musical comedy The Chaperons. With thirty four speaking and singing roles and a chorus of sixty it was said to be the largest musical organization so far seen in America. Next she was engaged as understudy for the great Alice Nielson in San Francisco and in 1902 had the opportunity to accompany her to London but demurred on that occasion due to a fear of the sea crossing. Instead she joined the cast of the hugely popular and long-running operatic fantasy The Storks. In April 1904, May was engaged to replace Bessie Wynne in the role of 'Sir Dashemoff Daily' in The Wizard of Oz and in September of that year followed that same actress in Babes in Toyland. By now she was an established success and much in demand.

She went to London after all, but as a star in her own right, and first appeared on the London Stage as 'Cinderella' at Theatre Royal, Drury Lane. Other London successes followed, including Castles in Spain, The Geisha and The Girls of Gottenberg. Although her voice had firmly cast her in light operatic roles, May longed for an opportunity to prove herself as a dramatic actress and was given the opportunity when the famous French actor Monsieur de Max wanted to introduce her to Paris as 'Juliet' to his 'Romeo'. However, her French was too weak, and although de Max was prepared to pay her expenses for six months whilst she prepared for the part, she was forced to decline. Six months out of her career was a luxury she could not afford, so she carried on with her musical comedy roles. Two years later she did go to Paris, where she was rapturously received by the French audiences. Returning home to the US after that engagement, she was temporarily reported missing by her parents when they did not hear from her for over five weeks.

Now she was a major star on both sides of the Atlantic and it seemed she had the World at her feet. Personal tragedy struck on January 31, 1910, however, when her mother was discovered dead in a gas-filled room. It was not determined whether the tragedy had been a suicide or an unfortunate accident.

Although it was reported that she would be marrying a nobleman, in April 1910, she married stockbroker Eaton Arthur Haines in Haverstraw, New York. It was a troubled marriage from the start. Haines, it appears, had misrepresented his wealth to her before their marriage, and she had to support him and his spendthrift ways. Worse, she alleged that he frequently beat her, always being careful to restrict his blows to her torso so as not to leave marks that might give away his abuse or impair her ability to earn money. In December 1914, after two turbulent years, she divorced him on the grounds of cruelty and financial desertion.

Continuing her career on both sides of the Atlantic, she was in France shortly before the outbreak of the Great War and escaped the German invasion by the margin of only a few weeks. De Sousa played the role of a model Juliette in the 1911 play of The Count of Luxembourg at Daly's Theatre in London. In 1913, De Sousa declared bankruptcy.

In 1918, De Sousa appeared in a touring theatrical production in Australia, Goody Two-Shoes, produced by George Tallis for the J.W. Williamson Company. While there, she married a local doctor, and eventually moved to Shanghai. She performed in several productions for the Amateur Dramatic Club there. Her husband died in 1941, and in 1943, following a seven-month imprisonment as a civilian internee under the Japanese in Chapei Civil Assembly Center, in Shanghai, China, she returned to the United States on the Gripsholm and took a job in Chicago as a scrubwoman in the public-school system. Her years of internment had taken their toll on her health however, and soon she was forced to quit working because she was too weak to continue. Without means to support herself, her condition worsened through malnutrition and she died penniless, a charity case in the county hospital, on 8 August 1948. Once the toast of Europe and America whose voice had thrilled both royalty and the masses, she died alone at age 63, unable even to feed herself. Her body lay unclaimed in the morgue for several days and was reported to have been interred in a paupers grave, but was probably buried on August 12 in an unmarked family plot in Mount Carmel Cemetery in Hillside, Illinois.

== Marriages ==
May De Sousa was married twice to:

- Eaton Arthur Haines, a stockbroker, of Nunda, New York. They married Haverstraw, New York, on 24 April 1910 and divorced in 1914, reportedly after De Sousa was beaten by her husband for years. Haines died in 1933.
- Dr. William E. O'Hara (1879—1941), an Australian surgeon. They met in 1918 while De Sousa was in Australia in a theatrical production and married in Melbourne, Australia, in either 1919 or 1920; he died in 1941.

== See also ==
- Valeska Suratt
