= In Judgement Of =

1918 silent film directed by Will S. Davis

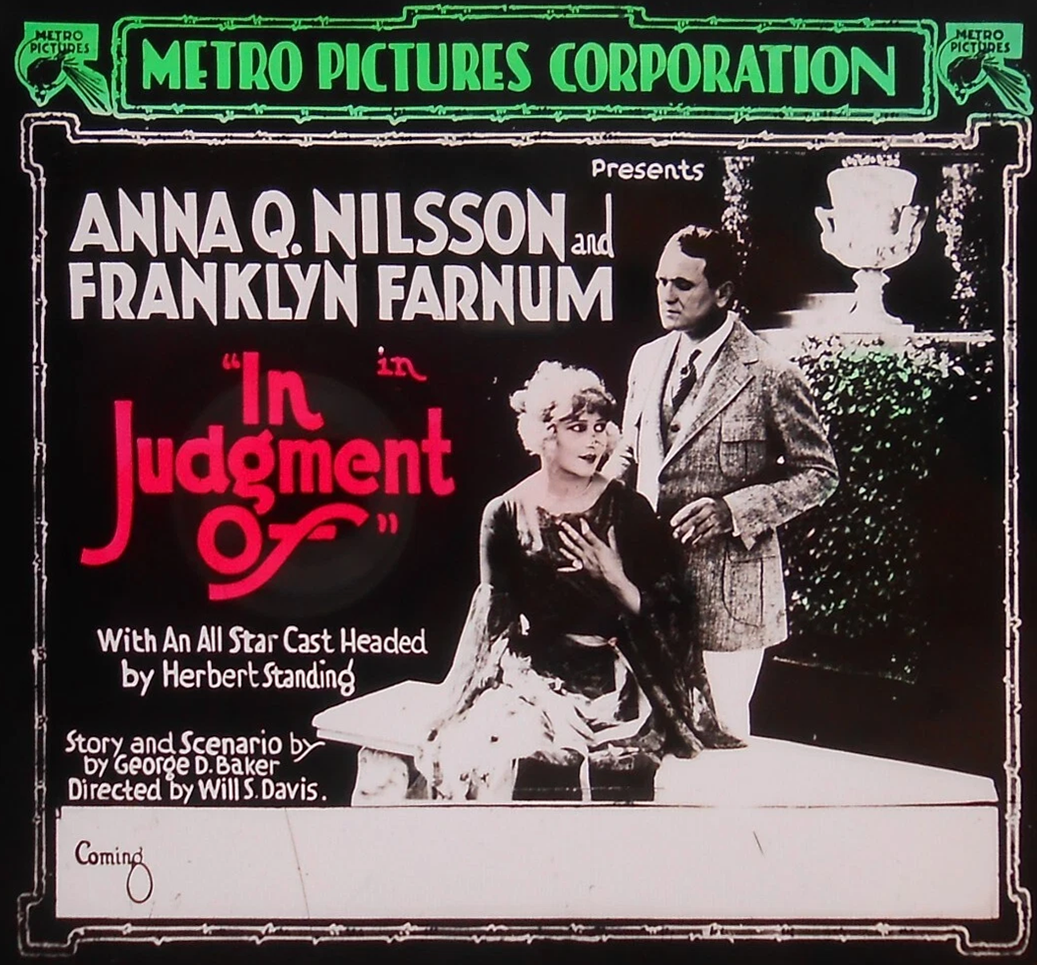
- Lantern slide
- Directed by: Will S. Davis
- Written by: George D. Baker
- Starring: Anna Q. Nilsson; Franklyn Farnum; Herbert Standing
- Cinematography: William C. Thompson
- Production company: Metro Pictures
- Distributed by: Metro Pictures
- Release date: August 12, 1918 (US)
- Running time: 5 reels
- Country: United States
- Language: English

In Judgement Of is a 1918 American silent drama film, directed by Will S. Davis. It stars Anna Q. Nilsson, Franklyn Farnum, and Herbert Standing, and was released on August 12, 1918.

== Cast list ==
- Anna Q. Nilsson as Mary Manners
- Franklyn Farnum as Dr. John O'Neill
- Herbert Standing as Judge Brainard
- Edward Alexander as Robert Brainard
- Lydia Knott as Mrs. Manners
- Harry S. Northrup as Andrew Vail
- Spottiswoode Aitken as Mr. Manners
- Katherine Griffith as Mrs. Brainard
- Robert Dunbar as T. A. Adams
