= Joseph Ruttenberg =

Russian-American cinematographer (1889–1983)

Joseph Ruttenberg, A.S.C.
- Promotional photo
- Born: July 4, 1889; St. Petersburg, Russia
- Died: May 1, 1983 (aged 93); Los Angeles, California, U.S.
- Occupation: Cinematographer
- Spouse: Rose Ruttenberg
- Children: Virginia Ruttenberg

Joseph Ruttenberg, A.S.C. (July 4, 1889 – May 1, 1983) was a Russian-American photojournalist and cinematographer.

Ruttenberg was accomplished at winning accolades. At MGM, Ruttenberg was nominated for the Academy Award for Best Cinematography 10 times, winning four. In addition, he won the 1954 Golden Globe Award for his camera work on the film Brigadoon.

== Career ==
Born into a Jewish family in St. Petersburg, Russia, Joseph Ruttenberg emigrated to the United States at the age of four, arriving in Boston, Massachusetts. As a young man he went to work at the Boston Globe as a photojournalist but left in 1915 to accept a job with the Fox Film Corporation in New York City to train as a cinematographer. Two years later, he was behind the camera for The Painted Madonna (1917), which marked the start of a remarkably successful career.

In the late 1920s, Ruttenberg went to work for Paramount Pictures in New York. His first assignment for a sound film was The Struggle (1931), D.W. Griffith's final film. In 1934, Ruttenberg signed with MGM, moving to Hollywood where he was invited to join the American Society of Cinematographers.

Joseph Ruttenberg retired from MGM in 1968 and died in Los Angeles on May 1, 1983.

== Filmography ==
- The Painted Madonna (1917)
- The Blue Streak (1917)
- The Slave (1917)
- Wife Number Two (1917)
- Thou Shalt Not Steal (1917)
- A Heart's Revenge (1917)
- The Debt of Honor (1918)
- Peg of the Pirates (1918)
- Doing Their Bit (1918)
- The Woman Who Gave (1918)
- The Yellow Dog (1918)
- Woman, Woman! (1919)
- A Fallen Idol (1919)
- My Little Sister (1919)
- The Shark (1920)
- From Now On (1920)
- The Tiger's Club (1920)
- The Thief (1920)
- The Mountain Woman (1921)
- Know Your Men (1921)
- A Virgin Paradise (1921)
- Beyond Price (1921)
- Silver Wings (1922)
- The Town That Forgot God (1922)
- Who Are My Parents? (1922)
- My Friend the Devil (1922)
- If Winter Comes (1923)
- Does It Pay? (1923)
- The Fool (1925)
- School for Wives (1925)
- Summer Bachelors (1926)
- The Struggle (1931)
- The Knife of the Party (1934)
- Woman in the Dark (1934)
- The People's Enemy (1935)
- Frankie and Johnnie (1935)
- Gigolette (1935)
- Three Godfathers (1936)
- Mad Holiday (1936)
- Fury (1936)
- Man Hunt (1936)
- Piccadilly Jim (1936)
- Big City (1937)
- Everybody Sing (1937)
- A Day at the Races (1937)
- Dramatic School (1938)
- The Great Waltz (1938)
- Three Comrades (1938)
- Spring Madness (1938)
- The First Hundred Years (1938)
- The Shopworn Angel (1938)
- On Borrowed Time (1939)
- Balalaika (1939)
- The Women (1939)
- The Ice Follies of 1939 (1939)
- Tell No Tales (1939)
- Comrade X (1940)
- Broadway Melody of 1940 (1940)
- The Philadelphia Story (1940)
- Waterloo Bridge (1940)
- Dr. Jekyll and Mr. Hyde (1941)
- Ziegfeld Girl (1941)
- Two-Faced Woman (1941)
- Woman of the Year (1942)
- Crossroads (1942)
- Random Harvest (1942)
- Mrs. Miniver (1942)
- Presenting Lily Mars (1943)
- Madame Curie (1943)
- Mrs. Parkington (1944)
- Gaslight (1944)
- The Valley of Decision (1945)
- Adventure (1945)
- My Brother Talks to Horses (1946)
- Killer McCoy (1947)
- Beloved Stranger (1947)
- Julia Misbehaves (1948)
- B.F.'s Daughter (1948)
- That Forsyte Woman (1949)
- The Bribe (1949)
- Side Street (1949)
- The Miniver Story (1950)
- The Magnificent Yankee (1950)
- The Big Hangover (1950)
- Cause for Alarm! (1950)
- Kind Lady (1951)
- It's a Big Country (1951)
- Too Young to Kiss (1951)
- The Great Caruso (1951)
- The Prisoner of Zenda (1952)
- Young Man With Ideas (1952)
- Because You're Mine (1952)
- Small Town Girl (1952)
- Julius Caesar (1953)
- The Great Diamond Robbery (1953)
- Latin Lovers (1953)
- Invitation to the Dance (1954)
- Her Twelve Men (1954)
- The Last Time I Saw Paris (1954)
- Brigadoon (1954)
- Interrupted Melody (1955)
- The Prodigal (1955)
- Kismet (1955)
- Somebody Up There Likes Me (1956)
- The Swan (1956)
- Until They Sail (1957)
- Man On Fire (1957)
- The Vintage (1957)
- Gigi (1958)
- The Reluctant Debutante (1958)
- Green Mansions (1959)
- The Wreck of the Mary Deare (1959)
- BUtterfield 8 (1960)
- The Subterraneans (1960)
- Two Loves (1961)
- Bachelor in Paradise (1961)
- Ada (1961)
- Who's Got the Action? (1962)
- The Hook (1962)
- A Global Affair (1963)
- It Happened at the World's Fair (1963)
- Who's Been Sleeping in My Bed? (1963)
- Harlow (1965)
- Sylvia (1965)
- Love Has Many Faces (1965)
- The Oscar (1966)
- Speedway (1968)

== Accolades ==
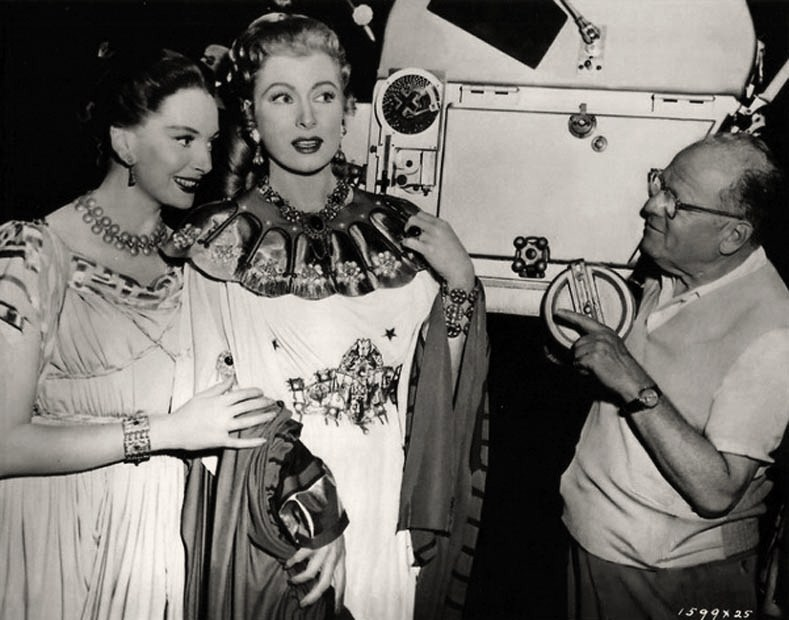
L-R: Deborah Kerr, Greer Garson & Joseph Ruttenberg on the set of Julius Caesar (1953)

Academy Awards wins:

- The Great Waltz (1938)
- Mrs. Miniver (1942)
- Somebody Up There Likes Me (1956)
- Gigi (1958)

Golden Globe Award win:

- Brigadoon (1954)

Academy Award nominations:

- Waterloo Bridge (1940)
- Dr. Jekyll and Mr. Hyde (1941)
- Madame Curie (1943)
- Gaslight (1944)
- Julius Caesar (1953)
- BUtterfield 8 (1960)

== Publications ==
- "Photographing Pre-Production Tests," in American Cinematographer (Hollywood), January 1956.
- "Sound-Stage Sea Saga," in American Cinematographer (Hollywood), April 1960.
- Positif (Paris), September 1972.
- Seminar in American Cinematographer (Hollywood), July 1975.
- Focus on Film (London), Spring 1976.
- In Dance in the Hollywood Musical, by Jerome Delamater, Ann Arbor, Michigan, 1981.
- Film History (Philadelphia), vol. 1, no. 1, 1987.

== Sources ==
- Stephens, Michael L. (10 December 2024). "Ruttenberg, Joseph". Gangster Films: A Comprehensive, Illustrated Reference to People, Films and Terms. McFarland. p. 268. ISBN 978-1-4766-1127-3.
- Raimondo-Souto, H. Mario (18 November 2014). Motion Picture Photography: A History, 1891-1960. McFarland. ISBN 978-0-7864-8407-2.
