= Thomas J. Geraghty =

American screenwriter (1883–1945)

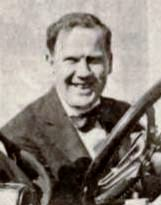
- Geraghty in 1920
- Born: April 10, 1883; Rushville, Indiana, U.S.
- Died: June 5, 1945 (aged 62); Hollywood, California, U.S.
- Occupation: Screenwriter
- Years active: 1917–1939
- Children: Carmelita Geraghty; Maurice Geraghty; Gerald Geraghty

Thomas J. Geraghty (April 10, 1883 – June 5, 1945), was an American screenwriter. He wrote for 70 films between 1917 and 1939. In the 1930s, he went to the United Kingdom, where he wrote a number of screenplays. He was born in Rushville, Indiana, and died in Hollywood, California. In April 1924, Geraghty was credited with coining the soon-to-be-popular vaudeville pun, "The Thief of Badgags".

== Selected filmography ==
- One Dollar Bid (1918)
- Her Inspiration (1918)
- The Turn of a Card (1918)
- With Hoops of Steel (1918)
- A Heart in Pawn (1919)
- The Courageous Coward (1919)
- When the Clouds Roll by (1919)
- In for Thirty Days (1919)
- The Mollycoddle (1920)
- Hollywood (1923)
- The Sporting Venus (1925)
- Wild, Wild Susan (1925)
- The Big Noise (1928)
- Three-Ring Marriage (1928)
- Weary River (1929)
- The Church Mouse (1934)
- No Limit (1935)
- Debt of Honour (1936)
- Two's Company (1936)
- Keep Your Seats, Please (1936)
- She Knew What She Wanted (1936)
- Wings of the Morning (1937)
- Shipyard Sally (1939)
