= The Eternal Mother (1920 film) =

1920 film by Will S. Davis

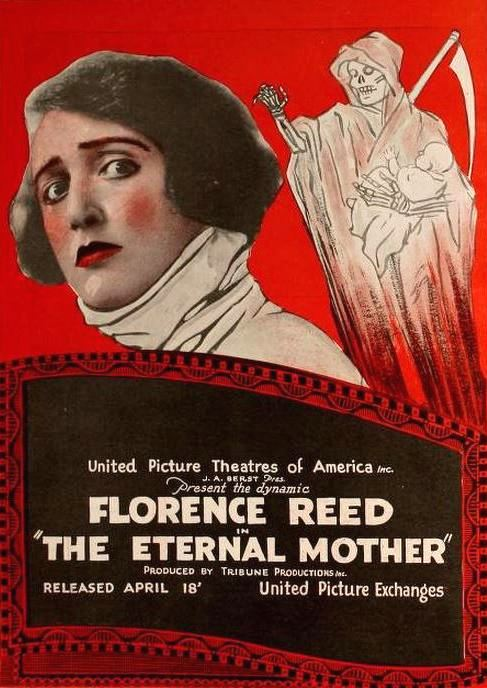
- Directed by: Will S. Davis (as William Davis)
- Written by: John K. Holbrook (story)
- Produced by: A. J. Bimberg Productions
- Starring: Florence Reed
- Distributed by: United Picture Theatres of America; Pioneer Film Corporation
- Release date: April 18, 1920
- Running time: 5 reels
- Country: United States
- Language: Silent (English intertitles)

The Eternal Mother is a lost 1920 American silent melodrama film directed by Will S. Davis and starring stage veteran Florence Reed.

Penultimate film directed by Davis before his death in 1920.

== Cast ==
- Florence Reed as Laura West
- Lionel Atwill as Howard Hollister
- Gareth Hughes as Stephen Rhodes
- Jere Austin
- Robert Broderick
