= Herbert Heyes =

American actor (1889–1958)

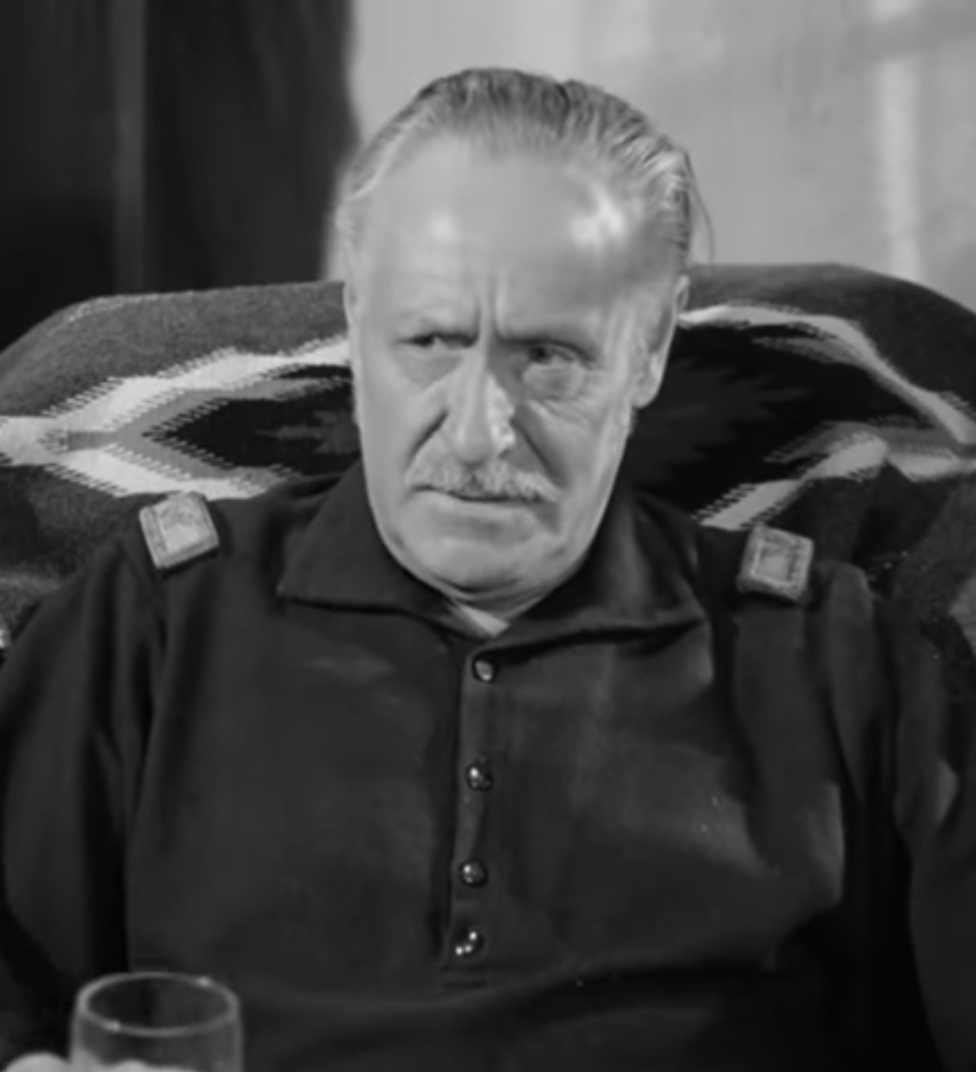
- Heyes in Only the Valiant (1951)
- Born: Herbert Harrison Heyes; August 3, 1889; Vader, Washington, U.S.
- Died: May 31, 1958 (aged 68); Los Angeles, California, U.S.
- Occupation: Actor
- Years active: 1915–1956
- Spouses: Mildred Von Hollen (m. 1913, divorced) Helen Millard Ward (m. 1934)
- Children: 2

Herbert Harrison Heyes (August 3, 1889 – May 31, 1958) was an American film actor. He appeared in nearly 100 films between 1915 and 1956, including the famed 1947 film Miracle on 34th Street, in which he played an ahistorical "Mr. Gimbel," owner of Gimbel's Department Store. He was born in Vader, Washington and died in North Hollywood, Los Angeles.

== Selected filmography ==
- Wild Oats (1916) - Richard Carew
- The Final Curtain (1916) - Herbert Lyle
- Under Two Flags (1916) - Bertie Cecil
- The Straight Way (1916) - John Madison
- Jealousy (1916)
- The Vixen (1916) - Knowles Murray
- The Victim (1916) - Dr. Boulden
- The Darling of Paris (1917) - Captain Phoebus
- The Tiger Woman (1917) - Mark Harris
- The Slave (1917) - David Atwell
- The Lesson (1917) - John Galvin
- Somewhere in America (1917) - John Gray
- The Outsider (1917) - Trego
- Heart of the Sunset (1918) - Dave Law
- Fallen Angel (1918) - Harry Adams
- Salomé (1918) - Sejanus
- The Bird of Prey (1918) - Robert Bradley
- The Heart of Rachael (1918) - Dr. Warren Gregory
- Her Inspiration (1918) - Harold Montague
- Children of Banishment (1919) - Allen Mackenzie
- Gambling in Souls (1919) - 'Duke' Charters
- More Deadly Than The Male (1919) - Terry O'Hara
- The Adventures of Ruth (1919) - Bob Wright
- Ruth of the Rockies (1920) - Justin Garret
- Deliverance (1919) - Ulysses (uncredited)
- The Land of Jazz (1920) - Dr. Vane Carruthers
- The Blushing Bride (1921) - Kingdom Ames
- The Queen of Sheba (1921) - Tamaran
- Wolves of the North (1921) - 'Wiki' Jack Horn
- The Dangerous Moment (1921) - George Duray
- Ever Since Eve (1921) - Carteret
- Dr. Jim (1921) - Captain Blake
- Shattered Dreams (1922) - Louis du Bois
- I Can Explain (1922) - Howard Dawson
- Don't Write Letters (1922) - Richard W. Jenks
- One Stolen Night (1923) - Herbert Medford
- It Is the Law (1924) - Justin Victor
- The Bachelor's Club -
- Between Us Girls (1942) - Lieutenant (uncredited)
- Destination Unknown (1942) - Daniels, American Diplomat
- Tennessee Johnson (1942) - Senator (uncredited)
- The Adventures of Smilin' Jack (1942, Serial) - Sir Cedric [Chs. 5-7] (uncredited)
- It Ain't Hay (1943) - Manager (uncredited)
- The Purple V (1943) - American Colonel (uncredited)
- King of the Cowboys (1943) - Arkansas Sheriff (uncredited)
- Chatterbox (1943) - Production Assistant (uncredited)
- Mission to Moscow (1943) - Congressman (uncredited)
- Calling Wild Bill Elliott (1943) - Governor Steve Nichols
- Bombardier (1943) - General (uncredited)
- Pilot No. 5 (1943) - U.S. Attorney at Justice Department (uncredited)
- Spy Train (1943) - Max Thornwald
- Is Everybody Happy? (1943) - Colonel (uncredited)
- Teen Age (1943) - District Attorney
- Mystery of the 13th Guest (1943) - Dr. Sherwood - Plastic Surgeon (uncredited)
- Campus Rhythm (1943) - J.P. Hartman
- Harvest Melody (1943) - Joe Burton
- Death Valley Manhunt (1943) - Judge Jim Hobart
- Standing Room Only (1944) - Colonel (uncredited)
- The Fighting Seabees (1944) - Capt. Millard (uncredited)
- Cowboy Canteen (1944) - Major C. L. Cox (uncredited)
- Million Dollar Kid (1944) - John H. Cortland
- Outlaws of Santa Fe (1944) - Henry Jackson
- Detective Kitty O'Day (1944) - Attorney Robert Jeffers
- Mr. Winkle Goes to War (1944) - Army Doctor (uncredited)
- Wilson (1944) - Senator (uncredited)
- Miracle on 34th Street (1947) - Mr. Gimbel (uncredited)
- T-Men (1947) - Chief Carson
- The Cobra Strikes (1948) - Theodore Cameron / Dr. Damon Cameron
- Behind Locked Doors (1948) - Judge Finlay Drake
- Kiss Tomorrow Goodbye (1950) - Ezra Dobson
- Union Station (1950) - Henry L. Murchison
- Tripoli (1950) - Gen. Eaton
- Bedtime for Bonzo (1951) - Dean Tillinghast
- Three Guys Named Mike (1951) - Scott Bellemy
- A Place in the Sun (1951) - Charles Eastman
- Only the Valiant (1951) - Col. Drumm
- Something to Live For (1952) - J.B. Crawley
- Carbine Williams (1952) - Lionel Daniels
- Park Row (1952) - Josiah Davenport
- Ruby Gentry (1952) - Judge Tackman
- Let's Do It Again (1953) - Mr. Randolph
- Man of Conflict (1953) - Mr. Evans
- New York Confidential (1955) - James Marshall
- The Far Horizons (1955) - President Thomas Jefferson
- The Seven Little Foys (1955) - Judge
- Love Is a Many-Splendored Thing (1955) - Father Low (uncredited)
- Sincerely Yours (1955) - J.R. Aldrich (uncredited)
- The Court-Martial of Billy Mitchell (1955) - General John J. Pershing
- Willy (TV series, 1955) - George Pilkington Sr. in episode "Papa′s Hot Tip"
- The Ten Commandments (1956) - Old Councillor (uncredited)
