= The Leech (1921 film) =

1921 film

- Directed by: Herbert Hancock
- Starring: Alexander Hall; Claire Whitney
- Cinematography: Alvin Knechtel
- Production company: Select Pictures
- Distributed by: Select Pictures
- Release date: July 25, 1921
- Running time: 50 minutes
- Country: United States
- Languages: Silent; English intertitles

The Leech is a 1921 American silent drama film directed by Herbert Hancock and starring Alexander Hall and Claire Whitney.

== Cast ==
- Ray Howard as Teddy
- Alexander Hall as Bill
- Claire Whitney as Dorothy
- Katherine Leon as Ruth
- Ren Gennard as Joe Turner

== Bibliography ==
- Connelly, Robert B. The Silents: Silent Feature Films, 1910-36, Volume 40, Issue 2. December Press, 1998.
- Munden, Kenneth White. The American Film Institute Catalog of Motion Pictures Produced in the United States, Part 1. University of California Press, 1997.
