= The Immigrant (1915 film) =

1915 film by George Melford

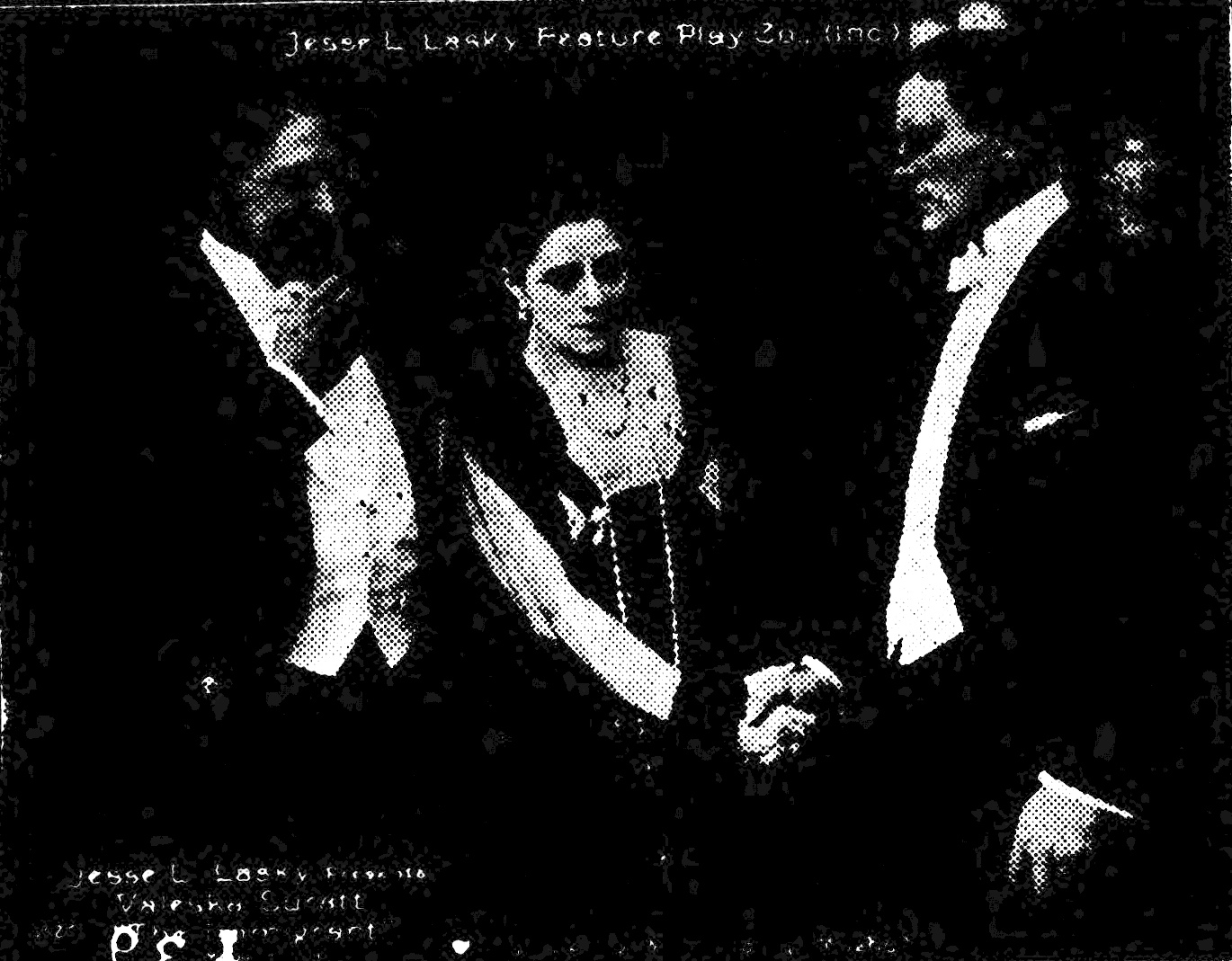
- Scene from the film
- Directed by: George Melford
- Written by: Marion Fairfax (scenario)
- Produced by: Jesse Lasky
- Starring: Valeska Suratt
- Production company: Jesse L. Lasky Feature Play Company
- Distributed by: Famous Players–Lasky; Paramount Pictures
- Release date: December 20, 1915
- Running time: 60 minutes
- Country: United States
- Languages: Silent; English intertitles

The Immigrant is a 1915 American silent drama film directed by George Melford and starring Valeska Suratt, an actress who specialized in playing vamp roles and who was one of Theda Bara's film rivals. The film is now considered lost.

This was Valeska Suratt's only film away from the Fox Film Studios.

== Cast ==
- Valeska Suratt - Masha
- Thomas Meighan - David Harding
- Theodore Roberts - J.J. Walton
- Jane Wolf - Olga (*aka Jane Wolfe)
- Hal Clements - John
- Ernest Joy - Walton's Partner
- Sydney Deane - Walton's secretary
- Mrs. Lewis McCord - the stewardess
- Bob Fleming - ship's officer
- Raymond Hatton - Munsing, Harding's secretary
- Gertrude Kellar - Walton's housekeeper

== Plot ==
Masha, a young Russian immigrant, on her way to this country, is insulted by one of the steamship officers and protected by David Harding, a young American contractor and civil engineer, just returning from Europe. He secures for her a berth in the second cabin, paying the difference in fare out of his own pocket. J.J. Walton, a wealthy political boss and contractor, traveling first class, is captivated by Masha's beauty. Masha is met at the dock in New York by her sister, Olga, and her drunken brother-in-law, John. Having given Harding their address, so he may call and be repaid for the money he has advanced to Masha, Walton learns the address, and secures from the brother-in-law permission to have Masha enter his house as a maid. The first night of her employment in Walton's household he attacks her, and when she flees to her sister pursues her, and by a promise of marriage and education, induces her to return. Harding has opened his offices in the same building with Walton's and bids against Walton for a contract for a big government dam in Arizona. Harding is backed by the reformers and Walton and his political ring find bribes and chances for graft will not tempt the young man and plan to blow up the dam when it nears completion. Walton takes Masha with him to Arizona to superintend the dam's destruction. Masha and Harding have met each other several times and he has always thought her to be the wife of his adversary. By means of threats, Walton has Masha entice Harding away from the dam the night of the explosion. Masha, free from Walton's threats, tells Harling of the contemplated explosion and sends him back to the dam, but too late. The explosion has occurred and the waters are plunging down onto the little village. Masha, fearing for the young man's life, follows him, while Walton in the moment of his triumph, fails to realize that the flood is undermining the house which he occupies and is killed when it collapses. Masha finds Harding unconscious on top of the floating house and there tells him for the first time that she has never been Walton's wife. Harding, still in love with the girl, asks her to marry him.

== See also ==
- List of Paramount Pictures films
