= Her Inspiration =

1918 silent film directed by Robert Thornby

- Directed by: Robert Thornby
- Written by: Thomas J. Geraghty; George D. Baker
- Produced by: George D. Baker
- Starring: May Allison; Herbert Heyes; Charles Edler
- Cinematography: William E. Fildew
- Production company: Metro Pictures
- Release date: December 30, 1918 (US)
- Running time: 5 reels
- Country: United States
- Language: English

Her Inspiration is a 1918 American silent drama film, directed by Robert Thornby. It stars May Allison, Herbert Heyes, and Charles Edler, and was released on December 30, 1918.

== Cast list ==
- May Allison as Kate Kendall
- Herbert Heyes as Harold Montague
- Charles Edler as Curt Moots
- Allan D. Sears as Big Hank
- Jack Brammall as Looney Lige
