= Eric Mayne =

American actor (1965–1947)

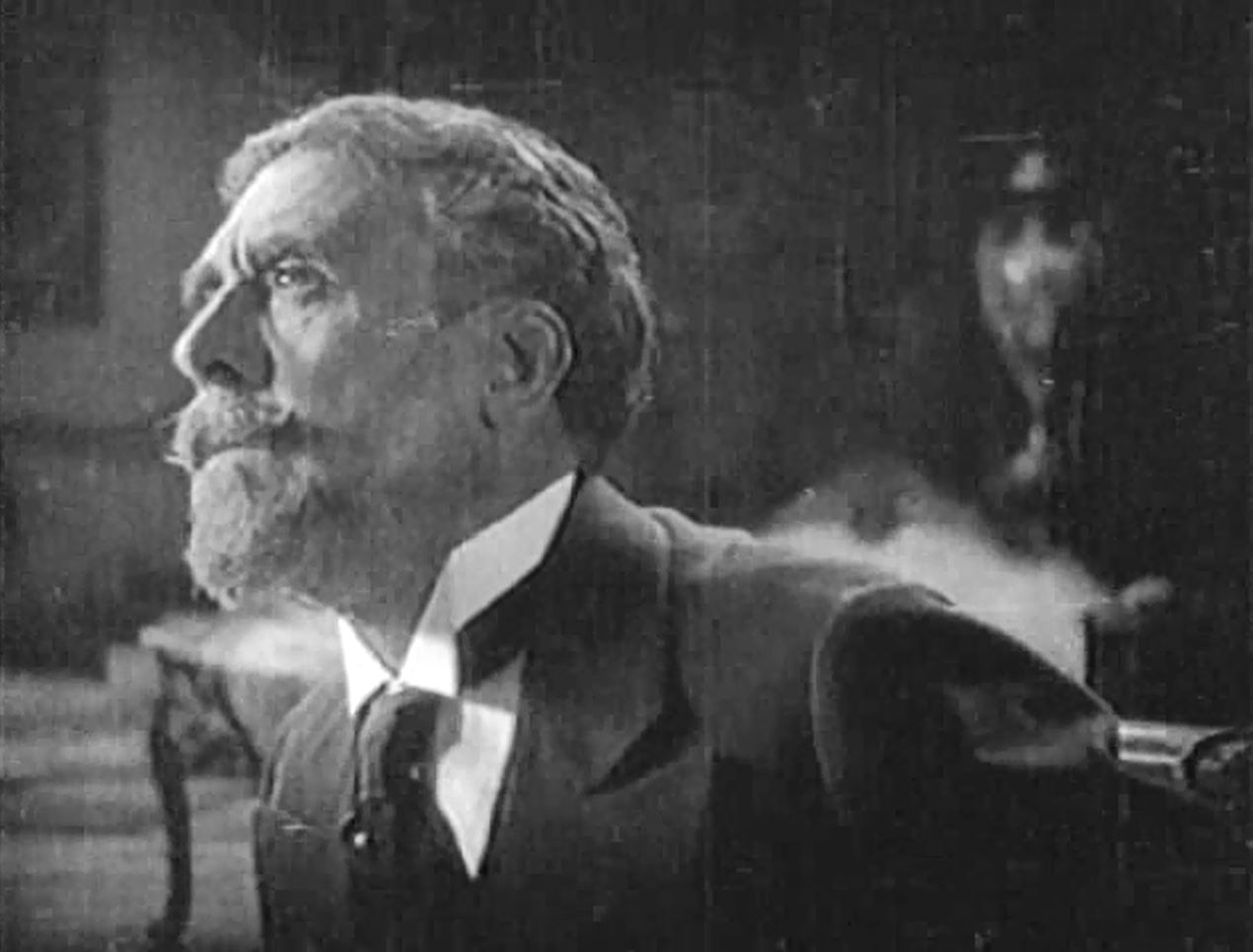
- From The Conquering Power (1921)
- Born: April 28, 1865; Dublin, Ireland
- Died: February 10, 1947 (aged 81); Hollywood, California
- Occupation: Actor

Eric Mayne (April 28, 1865 – February 10, 1947) was an Irish born American stage and film actor.

Mayne was born in Dublin and educated at Westminster and Durham in England. He was a star on stage in London in the early 20th century, at the London Lyceum and at Drury Lane. In 1908 and 1910 he played Prince Hildred in The Prince and the Beggar Maid at the Lyceum Theatre in London.

After arriving in Hollywood in 1915, and due to his size and appearance, he became a prolific and sought-after character player in silent movies, often being cast as either the heavy or a comic foil. With the advent of sound pictures he initially remained in demand as an extra and small-part supporting actor, however, his career declined until he was receiving only bit parts. He appeared in the films The New York Peacock, Wife Number Two, Her Hour, Help! Help! Police!, Marooned Hearts, The Conquering Power, Turn to the Right, The Prisoner of Zenda, Pawned, Dr. Jack, My American Wife, The Christian, Suzanna, Prodigal Daughters, Human Wreckage, Her Reputation, Cameo Kirby, The Drums of Jeopardy, Black Oxen, The Yankee Consul, Gerald Cranston's Lady, Her Night of Romance, The Scarlet Honeymoon, Cyclone Cavalier, East Lynne, Hearts and Spangles, Folly of Youth, Money to Burn, Married Alive, The Canyon of Adventure, Rackety Rax, Night of Terror, The Drunkard and Ticket to Paradise, among others.

In the 1940s, he was a lecturer in Shakespeare in Los Angeles. Mayne died in his sleep in Hollywood, California, on February 10, 1947, at the age of 81.
