= Claire Whitney =

American actress

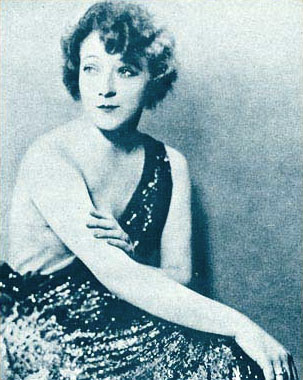
- Publicity photo of Whitney from Who's Who on the Screen (1920)
- Born: May 6, 1890; New York City, U.S.
- Died: August 27, 1969 (aged 79); Los Angeles, California, U.S.
- Occupation: Actress
- Years active: 1912–1949
- Spouse(s): Jan von Hoegarden (m.1917–ann. 1920); Robert Emmett Keane (m.1921)

Claire Whitney (May 6, 1890 – August 27, 1969) was an American stage and film actress who appeared in 111 films between 1912 and 1949. Only 21 of these films survive, as most have been lost.

Whitney gained early acting experience with a stock theater company in Massachusetts, following which she toured the United States in a vaudeville production of Little Mother.

Whitney made her first film in 1913 for Solax and continued making films until 1921, mainly for Fox Film Corporation. Whitney came back to films in 1926 with a role in The Great Gatsby which would be her final silent film. She continued working in film between 1931 and 1949 when she retired.

Whitney's Broadway credits include Broadway Interlude (1934), Page Pygmalion (1932), An Innocent Idea (1920), and The Net (1919).

On March 20, 1920, Whitney's marriage to Jean Léon Ferdinand van Hoegaerden, an actor also known as John Sunderland, was annulled after he admitted having a wife and children in Belgium. The couple had wed on November 12, 1917, in New York.

Whitney died in Los Angeles on August 27, 1969, at the age of 79. She is buried in an unmarked grave in Forest Lawn Memorial Park, next to her husband, Robert Emmett Keane.

== Selected filmography ==
Year	Title	Role	Notes
1913	The Star of India	Mrs. Kenneth	
1914	Fighting Death	Clara	Lost film
1914	The Million Dollar Robbery	Daphne Pell	
1915	Should A Mother Tell?	Baroness Gauntier	Lost film
1915	The Song of Hate		Lost film
1915	The Galley Slave	Cecil Blaine	Lost film
1916	East Lynne	Barbara Hare	
1916	The Ruling Passion	Claire Sherlock	Lost film
1916	Under Two Flags	Venitia	Lost film
1916	The Straight Way	Nell Madison	Lost film
1916	Jealousy	Sorceress	Uncredited; lost film
1917	Heart and Soul	Bess	Lost film
1917	Camille	Celeste Duval	Lost film
1917	Thou Shalt Not Steal	Madeleine	
1918	Ruling Passions	Louise Palmer	Lost film
1919	The Man Who Stayed at Home	Molly Preston	
1919	Moral Suicide	Lucy Daniels	
1920	Why Women Sin	Baroness de Ville	
1920	Love, Honor and Obey	Marion Holbury	
1921	The Passionate Pilgrim	Esther	Incomplete film
1921	The Leech	Dorothy	
1921	Fine Feathers	Jane Reynolds	
1926	The Great Gatsby	Catherine	Lost film, only the trailer survives
1931	A Free Soul	Aunt Helen	Uncredited
1934	Enlighten Thy Daughter	Alice Stevens	Alternative title: Blind Fools
1938	Secrets of a Nurse	Nurse	Uncredited
1939	Laugh It Off	Miss Martin	
1940	Chip of the Flying U	Miss Robinson	
1940	The House of Seven Gables	Waitress	Uncredited
1941	Mob Town	Mrs. Simpson	Uncredited
1942	The Silver Bullet	Emily Morgan	
1943	So's Your Uncle	Marta	
1944	The Mummy's Ghost	Ella Norman	
1945	Anchors Aweigh	U.S.O. Mother	Uncredited
1946	The Haunted Mine	Mrs. Durant	
1947	Christmas Eve	Mrs. Bunyan	Alternative title: Sinner's Holiday
1949	An Old-Fashioned Girl	Miss Mills	
