= Valeska Suratt =

American stage and silent film actress

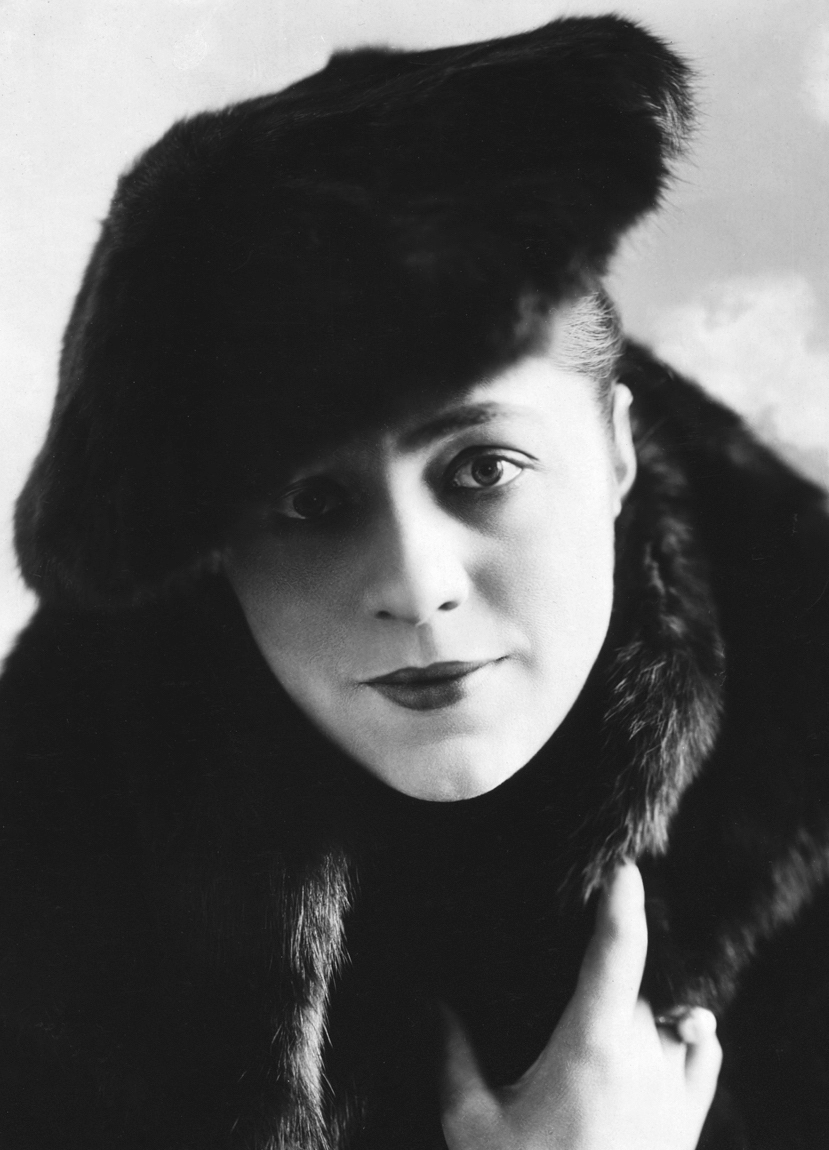
- Suratt, c. 1917
- Born: June 28, 1882; Owensville, Indiana, U.S.
- Died: July 2, 1962 (aged 80); Washington, D.C., U.S.
- Resting place: Highland Lawn Cemetery
- Other name: Valeska Surratt
- Occupation: Actress
- Years active: 1906–1922
- Spouses: Billy Gould (m. 1904; div. 1911) Fletcher Norton (m. 1911; died 1941)

Valeska Suratt (June 28, 1882 – July 2, 1962) was an American stage and silent film actress. Over the course of her career, Suratt appeared in 11 silent films, all of which are now lost, mainly due to the 1937 Fox vault fire.

== Early life ==
Suratt was born in Owensville, Indiana, to Ralph and Anna (née Matthews) Suratt. Her paternal grandparents were French immigrants and her maternal grandparents emigrated to the United States from England. She had one stepsister, one older brother and a younger sister. When she was six, her family moved to Terre Haute, Indiana. She dropped out of school in 1899 and worked at a photographer's studio. Suratt later moved to Indianapolis where she worked as an assistant in a millinery at a department store.

== Career ==
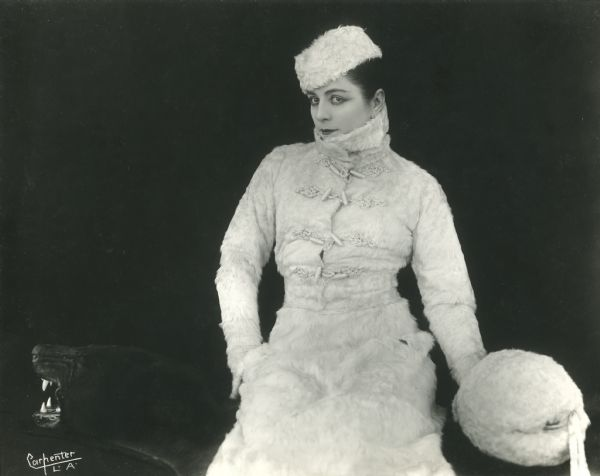
Publicity photograph by Gerald Carpenter, c. 1916

Suratt began her career as an actress on the Chicago stage. Around 1900, she began appearing in vaudeville. She soon paired with performer Billy Gould (whom she later married) and the two created a successful act that included a so-called Apache dance performed by Suratt. In 1906, she made her Broadway debut in the musical The Belle of Mayfair, followed by a role in Hip! Hip! Hooray! the following year. By 1908, Suratt and Gould had parted ways and Suratt began a successful solo act which featured her singing and dancing while wearing glamorous costumes and gowns. Suratt's success in vaudeville continued and she began billing herself as "Vaudeville's Greatest Star" and "The Biggest Drawing Card in New York". In 1910, she appeared in the show The Girl with the Whooping Cough. New York City mayor William Jay Gaynor claimed that the show was "salacious" and had it shut down because of its sexually suggestive themes. In December 1910, she teamed up with Fletcher Norton (who became her second husband) in a play titled Bouffe Variety. She became noted for appearing in playlets where she played a variety of roles in comedies and melodramas.

During her years on the stage, Valeska was noted for the high fashion clothes she wore on stage and her name became synonymous with lavish gowns worldwide. Among the items which were most commented about was an $11,000 Cinderella cloak. She was sometimes called the "Empress of Fashions". She possibly was another model for the famous Gibson Girl sketchings. Vogue magazine later named her "one of the best dressed women on the stage" and routinely wrote about the gowns she wore in her stage shows in detail.

In 1915, Suratt signed with Fox. Like fellow Fox contract players Theda Bara and Virginia Pearson, Suratt was marketed as a vamp and was cast as seductive and exotic characters. Suratt made her film debut in The Soul of Broadway in 1915. She reportedly wore more than 150 gowns in the film which cost $25,000 each. The same year, she made The Immigrant followed by The Straight Way (1916), Jealousy (1916), The Victim (1916), The New York Peacock (1916), and She (1917). She performed in a total of 11 silent films during her career, all of which are now considered lost.

=== Decline ===
By 1920, Suratt's career had begun to wane as vaudeville fell out of a favor with audiences, as did the craze for the vamp image. In 1928, Suratt and scholar Mirza Ahmad Sohrab sued Cecil B. DeMille for stealing the scenario for The King of Kings from them. The case went to trial in February 1930 but eventually was settled without publicity. Suratt, who had left films in 1917, appeared to be unofficially blacklisted after the suit.

By the end of the 1920s, Suratt disappeared. In the 1930s, she was discovered living in a cheap hotel in New York City and was broke. After novelist Fannie Hurst learned of Suratt's situation, she organized a benefit for her which raised around $2,000. Suratt disappeared for a few weeks after receiving the money and later returned to her hotel room penniless having squandered the money gambling. In an attempt to revive her career, Suratt tried to sell her life's story to one of William Randolph Hearst's newspapers. A reporter who read Suratt's manuscript later said that Suratt wrote that she was the Virgin Mary and the mother of God. Suratt never revived her career on the stage or in films.

== Personal life ==
Suratt married twice and had no children. Her first husband was William J. Flannery (1869–1950), known as Billy Gould, a vaudeville comedian known for his blackface minstrel roles. She reportedly married him around 1904. After their divorce in 1911, she married actor Fletcher Norton. After eight weeks of marriage, Fletcher Norton was granted a divorce on July 16, 1911.

She was a member of the Baháʼí Faith.

== Death ==
Valeska Suratt died in a nursing home in Washington, D.C., on July 2, 1962. She was 80 years old. Suratt is interred in Highland Lawn Cemetery in Terre Haute, Indiana.

== Broadway credits ==
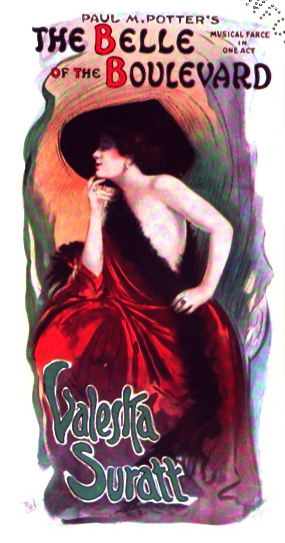
Suratt in The Belle of the Boulevard by Jean Paleologue, 1910

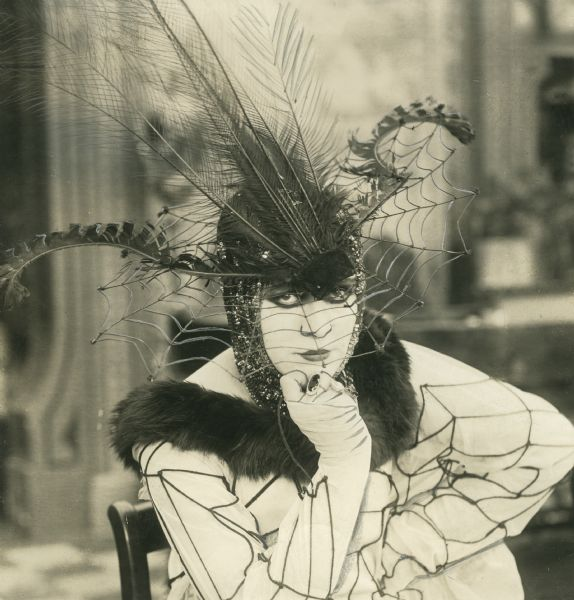
Valeska Suratt's 1917 The New York Peacock

Date	Production	Role	Notes
December 3, 1906 – March 30, 1907	The Belle of Mayfair	Duchess of Dunmow	
October 10 – December 7, 1907	Hip! Hip! Hooray!	Mrs. Vera Shapeleigh	
April 25 – May 1910	The Girl with the Whooping Cough	Regina	
June 2 – September 1911	The Red Rose	Lola	Costume and scenic design
July 6 – September 9, 1922	Spice of 1922		

== Filmography ==
Year	Title	Role	Notes
1915	The Soul of Broadway	Grace Leonard, a.k.a. La Valencia	Lost film
1915	The Immigrant	Masha	Lost film
1916	The Straight Way	Mary Madison	Lost film
1916	Jealousy	Anne Baxter	Lost film
1916	The Victim	Ruth Merrill	Lost film
1917	The New York Peacock	Zena	Lost film
1917	She	Ayesha, a.k.a. "She"	Lost film
1917	The Slave	Caroline	Lost film
1917	The Siren	Cherry Millard	Lost film
1917	Wife Number Two	Emma Rolfe	Lost film
1917	A Rich Man's Plaything	Marie Grandon	Lost film

== See also ==
- May de Sousa

== Sources ==
- "Startling Secrets of the World's Most Famous Self-Made Beauty." Cedar Rapids Republican. June 16, 1912, Page 13.
- "Valeska Suratt Thursday." Fort Wayne Journal. July 29, 1917, Page 37.
- "A Journey Through Queen of Night's Apartment." Oakland Tribune. April 5, 1914, Page 10.
- "The Kiss-Waltz." Racine Journal-News. February 5, 1913, Page 10.
- "Star in the Soul of Broadway." Wichita Falls Daily Times. Page 16.
