= Sic 'Em =

Sic 'Em is a command used by dog handlers

- Sic 'Em, Towser, a movie by Harold Lloyd
- Sic 'Em Friday, MTV2 television feature
- Sic 'em Bears, a hand gesture
- "Sic Em", 2016 song by Thugli
