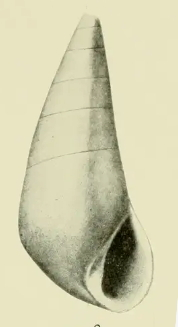
- Shell of Melanella draconis (original image)

Scientific classification
- Kingdom: Animalia
- Phylum: Mollusca
- Class: Gastropoda
- Subclass: Caenogastropoda
- Order: Littorinimorpha
- Family: Eulimidae
- Genus: Melanella
- Species: M. draconis

Binomial name
- Melanella draconis (Bartsch, 1917)

Synonyms
- Melanella (Balcis) draconis Bartsch, 1917 superseded combination

= Melanella draconis =

Species of gastropod

Melanella draconis is a species of sea snail, a marine gastropod mollusk in the family Eulimidae. The species is one of many species known to exist within the genus, Melanella.

== Description ==
The length of the shell attains 6.1 mm, its diameter 2.7 mm.

(Oroginal description) The short shell is very broadly conical, milk-white in color, and flexed in a single direction. The tip of the examined shell is broken. There are 7½ whorls remaining. The first two remaining whorls are slightly rounded, while the rest are almost flat, with the suture well marked throughout. The body whorl is rather stout, and its periphery is decidedly angulated. The base is short, somewhat tumid anteriorly, and well rounded. The aperture is broadly oval, with an acute posterior angle; the outer lip is decidedly sinuous and strongly protracted in the middle, where it forms a decidedly claw-like element. The inner lip is stout and strongly reflected over and appressed to the base, while the parietal wall is covered by a rather thick callus.

== Distribution ==
This species occurs off the Pacific coast of Lower California and Mexico.

Also found as a fossil on Dean Man's Island, California.
