= Melanella necropolitana =

- Shell of Melanella necropolitana (holotype)

Scientific classification
- Kingdom: Animalia
- Phylum: Mollusca
- Class: Gastropoda
- Subclass: Caenogastropoda
- Order: Littorinimorpha
- Family: Eulimidae
- Genus: Melanella
- Species: †M. necropolitana

Binomial name
- †Melanella necropolitana Bartsch, 1917

Synonyms
- † Melanella (Melanella) necropolitana Bartsch, 1917 alternative representation

Species of gastropod

Melanella necropolitana is an extinct species of sea snail, a marine gastropod mollusk in the family Eulimidae.

According to WoRMS, the generic placement of this species remains unassessed and is therefore uncertain.

== Description ==
The length of the holotype of the shell attains 7.5 mm, its diameter 2 mm.

(Original description) The moderately large shell is elongate-conic, and slender, with a perfectly straight-sided spire. The shell contains 13 whorls. The first two whorls are moderately rounded and separated by a well-marked suture, while the remaining whorls are flattened, with a scarcely impressed suture. The periphery of the body whorl is angulated. The base is moderately long and well rounded. The aperture is oval; the posterior angle is acute; the outer lip is angulated at the junction of the outer and basal lips; the inner lip is oblique, curved, and slightly revolute, being reflected over and appressed to the base posteriorly; and the parietal wall is covered with a thin callus.

== Distribution ==
Fossils of this species were found off Deadman's Island (San Pedro), California.
