= Wendell Holmes (actor) =

American actor (1914–1962)

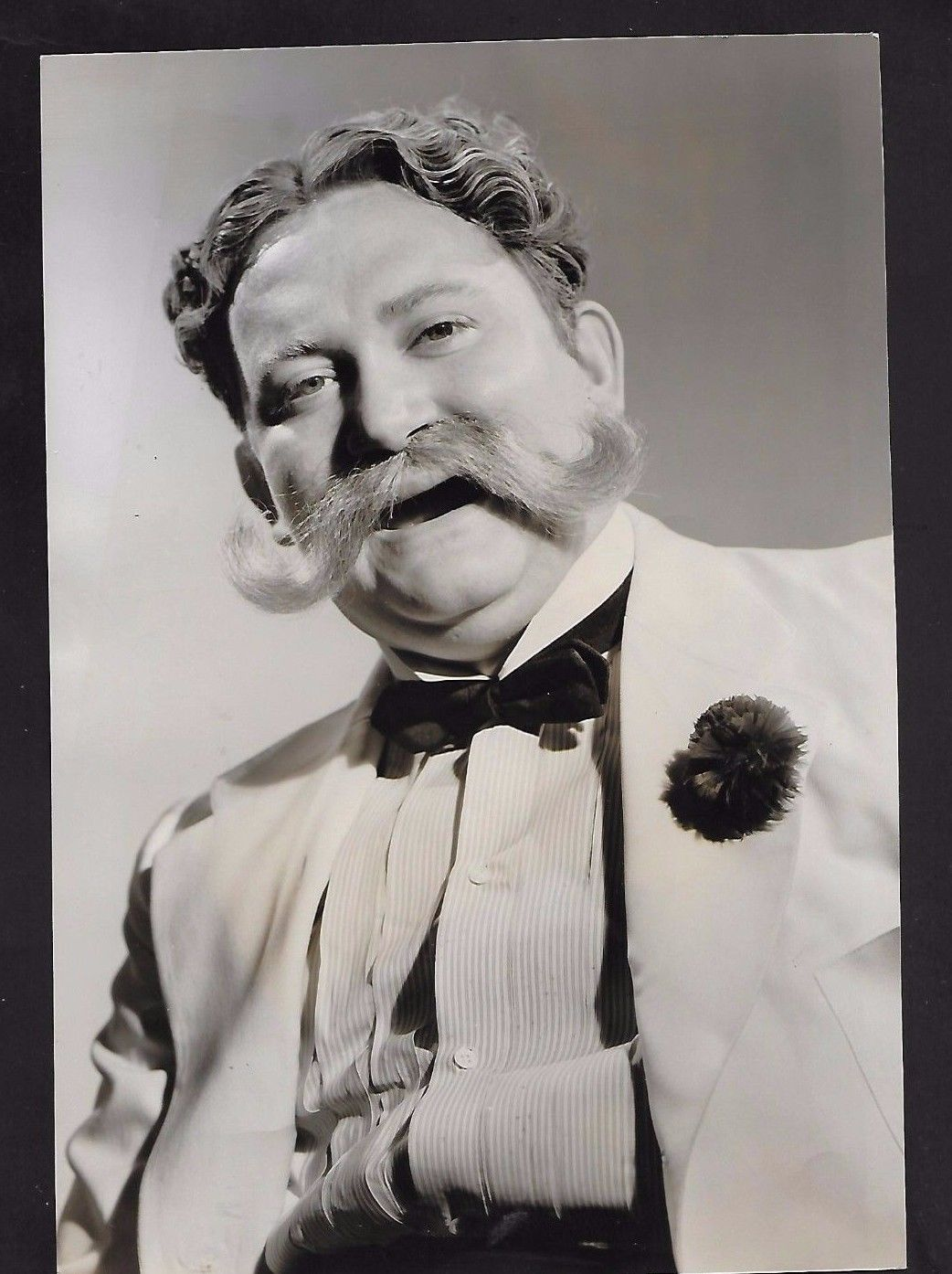
- Holmes as Colonel Humphrey J. Flack, 1947
- Born: August 17, 1914; Cheshire, Ohio, U.S.
- Died: April 27, 1962 (aged 47); Paris, France
- Other name: Oliver Wendell Holmes
- Education: The Ohio State University
- Occupation: Actor
- Years active: 1934–1962
- Spouse(s): Lois Jesson Holmes (1938–1954) (divorced); Adrienne Marden (1956–1962) (divorced)

Wendell Holmes (August 17, 1914 – April 27, 1962) was an American actor whose career included work in radio, television, Broadway, and film.

== Early years ==
Holmes was born Oliver Wendell Holmes in Cheshire, Ohio, to Ferdie and Ada Holmes. Census records indicate that by 1930 the family was living in Columbus, Ohio.

== Career ==
An article appearing in The Des Moines Register (1941) mentions Holmes being born on a farm and describes his winning a Chautauqua competition at age six, entering high school at age ten, and graduating from Ohio State University at age 18 with a degree in Education. It further states that instead of becoming an educator, Holmes hitch-hiked to New York and began working as an actor, starting his radio career in 1934.

An article appearing in The Daily Dispatch (1949) mentions that Holmes' parents were school teachers and adds to the Chautauqua event by noting it took place in Middleport, Ohio, where a talent scout signed him up for more work.

The same Daily Dispatch article (1949) quotes Holmes as saying at the time, "There are about 5,000 radio actors here, and last year they averaged $16 a week salary. Only about 500 manage to earn a truckdriver's living.... When I started in 1934 I got $20 a week for working in 30 shows."

During the years 1948–49, Holmes appeared as Dr. Watson in the radio adaptation of Sherlock Holmes starring John Stanley, but was credited as "George Spelvin" to avoid confusion between his actual surname and the surname of the show's protagonist.

Over the years, Holmes acted in more than 40 radio dramas, 50 TV episodes, and 10 movies.

== Personal life and death ==
On June 20, 1938, Holmes married actress Lois E Jesson in Manhattan, New York. Following his divorce (1954) from Jesson, Holmes married actress Adrienne Marden in Santa Monica, California, on August 12, 1956.

Wendell Holmes died of what is thought to have been a heart attack in Paris, France, on April 27, 1962.

== Radio acting ==
Year	Title	Role	Notes
1945	Words at War: "Apartment in Athens"	voice actor	Radio drama
1947	Colonel Humphrey Flack	voice actor	Radio drama
1948	The Ford Theater: "Storm in a Teacup"	voice actor	Radio drama
1948	The Mysterious Traveler: "The Man Who Vanished"	voice actor	Radio drama
1948	Sherlock Holmes: "The Blue Carbuncle	voice actor	Radio drama; credited as George Spelvin
1950	Dimension X: "Almost Human"	voice actor	Radio drama
1950	Dimension X: "And the Moon Be Still as Bright"	voice actor	Radio drama
1950	Dimension X: "No Contact"	voice actor	Radio drama
1950	Dimension X: "Mars Is Heaven"	voice actor	Radio drama
1950	Dimension X: "The Outer Limit"	voice actor	Radio drama
1950	Dimension X: "The Potters of Firsk"	voice actor	Radio drama
1950	Dimension X: "The Roads Must Roll"	voice actor	Radio drama
1951	John Steele, Adventurer: "Counterpoint"	voice actor	Radio drama
1951	Dimension X: "First Contact"	voice actor	Radio drama
1951	Dimension X: "The Last Objective"	voice actor	Radio drama
1952	Best Plays: Arsenic and Old Lace	voice actor	Radio drama
1952	The Chase: "Career Girl"	voice actor	Radio drama
1953	The Chase: "A Frame for Murder"	voice actor	Radio drama
1953	21st Precinct: "The Dog Day"	voice actor	Radio drama
1955	X Minus One: "The Green Hills of Earth"	voice actor	Radio drama
1955	X Minus One: "A Logic Named Joe"	voice actor	Radio drama
1955	X Minus One: "No Contact"	voice actor	Radio drama
1955	X Minus One: "Mars Is Heaven"	voice actor	Radio drama
1955	X Minus One: "First Contact"	voice actor	Radio drama
1955	X Minus One: "Nightfall"	voice actor	Radio drama
1955	X Minus One: "The Outer Limit"	voice actor	Radio drama
1956	X Minus One: "Chain of Command"	voice actor	Radio drama
1956	X Minus One: "A Gun for Dinosaur"	voice actor	Radio drama
1956	X Minus One: "Honeymoon in Hell"	voice actor	Radio drama
1956	X Minus One: "Mr. Costello, Hero"	voice actor	Radio drama
1956	X Minus One: "The Old Die Rich"	voice actor	Radio drama
1956	X Minus One: "Protective Mimicry"	voice actor	Radio drama
1956	X Minus One: "The Roads Must Roll"	voice actor	Radio drama
1956	X Minus One: "Skulking Permit"	voice actor	Radio drama
1956	X Minus One: "The Snowball Effect"	voice actor	Radio drama
1956	X Minus One: "Soldier Boy"	voice actor	Radio drama
1957	X Minus One: "The Category Inventor"	voice actor	Radio drama
1957	X Minus One: "Discovery of Morniel Mathaway"	voice actor	Radio drama
1957	X Minus One: "Man's Best Friend"	voice actor	Radio drama
1957	X Minus One: "Open Warfare"	voice actor	Radio drama
1957	X Minus One: "Saucer of Loneliness"	voice actor	Radio drama
1957	X Minus One: "The Scapegoat"	voice actor	Radio drama
1957	X Minus One: "Something for Nothing"	voice actor	Radio drama
1961	Yours Truly, Johnny Dollar: "The Stock in Trade Matter"	voice actor	Radio drama

== Filmography ==
Year	Title	Role	Notes
1941	Always Tomorrow: The Portrait of an American Business	Bottler	Promotional film, Uncredited
1949	Lost Boundaries	Mr. Morris Mitchell	Movie
1955	Medic	Dr. Welch	Episode: "Dr. Impossible"
1955	The Man Behind the Badge	Lawrence Deshaw	Episode: "The Case of the Dying Past"
1955	The Man Behind the Badge	Pawling	Episode: "The Case of the Part-Time Cop"
1955	Mr. Citizen		Minor role, Episode: "One for the Padre"
1957	Official Detective	Wendell Jordan	Episode: "Body in the Trunk"
1957	The Court of Last Resort	Terry Booth	Episode: "The Clarence Redding Case"
1958	Alfred Hitchcock Presents	Henry C. Farnsworth	Season 3 Episode 36: "The Safe Place"
1958	Alfred Hitchcock Presents	Mr. Herrick, the Prosecutor	Season 4 Episode 5: "The $2,000,000 Defense"
1958	The Californians	Krego	Episode: "Death By Proxy"
1958	Young and Wild	Lewis J. Christopher	Movie
1958	The Adventures of Jim Bowie	Seth Morton	Episode: "Man on the Street"
1958	Father Knows Best	Dr. Runeberg	Episode: "Be Kind to Bud Week"
1958	I Want to Live!	Detective	Movie
1958	Leave It to Beaver	Mr. T.J. Willet	Episode: "Music Lesson"
1958	Perry Mason	Dr. Forbes	Episode: "The Case of the Desperate Daughter"
1958	Perry Mason	Howard Evans	Episode: "The Case of the Sardonic Sergeant"
1959	Good Day for a Hanging	Tallant Joslin	Movie
1959	Never Steal Anything Small	George Alper	Movie, Uncredited
1959	Gunsmoke	Betchel	Episode: "Doc Quits"
1959	Behind Closed Doors	Boris Gorin	Episode: "The Geneva Story"
1959	Zorro	Storekeeper	Episode: "The Brooch"
1959	Zorro	Storekeeper Avila	Episode: "The Missing Father"
1959	Zorro	Storekeeper Avila	Episode: "Please Believe Me"
1959	Compulsion	Jonas Kessler	Movie, Uncredited
1959	Playhouse 90	Judge Ives	Episode: "Judgment at Nuremberg"
1959	The Rough Riders	Sam Hanks	Episode: "Hired Gun"
1959	But Not for Me	Miles Montgomery	Movie
1959	Edge of Eternity	Sam Houghton	Movie
1959	The Twilight Zone	Cooper	Episode: "Escape Clause"
1959	Man with a Camera	Carl Ganza	Episode: ":Missing"
1959	Special Agent 7	Neeley	Episode: "Male Order"
1959	Lawman	Cal Nibley	Episode: "The Press"
1959	Leave It to Beaver	Mr. T.J. Willet	Episode: "Beaver's Hero"
1959	Maverick	Mayor Uli Bemus	Episode: "The Cats of Paradise"
1959	The Texan	Marshal Sommers	Episode: "Dangerous Ground"
1959	Westinghouse Desilu Playhouse	Lieutenant Holson	Episode: "So Tender, So Profane"
1960	Alfred Hitchcock Presents	John B. Halverson	Season 5 Episode 19: "Not the Running Type"
1960	Bonanza	Judge Scribner	Episode: "Death at Dawn"
1960	Hawaiian Eye	Dr. Abner Moses Good	Episode: "The Kamehameha Cloak"
1960	Leave It to Beaver	Andy Hadlock	Episode: "Beaver and Andy"
1960	Tales of Wells Fargo	Governor	Episode: "The Governor's Visit"
1960	Black Saddle	Doc Hazen	Episode: "Mr. Simpson"
1960	Zane Grey Theater	Cobson, Auctioneer	Episode: "Never Too Late"
1960	Maverick	Colonel Dutton	Episode: "Greenbacks, Unlimited"
1960	Perry Mason	District Attorney Williams	Episode: "The Case of the Bashful Burro"
1960	Startime	Rigsby	Episode: "Incident at a Corner"
1960	Mr. Lucky	David Bullitt	Episode: "Hit and Run"
1960	Because They're Young	Principal Dolan	Movie
1960	Overland Trail	Mayor Bill Filmore	Episode: "First Stage to Denver"
1960	Westinghouse Desilu Playhouse		Minor role, Episode: "City in Bondage"
1960	Hawaiian Eye	Sam Perkins	Episode: "Little Blalah"
1960	Peter Gunn	Janos Thorwald	Episode: "The Semi-Private Eye"
1960	Inherit The Wind	Banker, Critic at City Meeting	Movie, Uncredited
1960	Elmer Gantry	Reverend Ulrich	Movie
1960	The Texan	Henry Morton	Episode: "24 Hours to Live"
1960	Bonanza	Judge Rand	Episode: "Badge Without Honor"
1960	The Westerner	Henry Hadley	Episode: "Mrs. Kennedy"
1960	The Great Imposter	Surgeon Commander Winston	Movie, Uncredited
1960	Shotgun Slade		Minor role, Episode: "A Plate of Death"
1960	Grand Jury	Taylor	Episode: "Condemned"
1961	The Absent Minded Professor	General Poynter	Movie
1961	Checkmate	Mervin Everhardt	Episode: "Portrait of a Man Running"
1961	Bus Stop	Dean Drayton	Episode: "Success Story"
1961	Follow The Sun	The Judge	Episode: "The Woman Who Never Was"
1961	The Untouchables	The Judge	Episode: "Loophole"
1961	Dr. Kildare	Judge Inley	Episode: "Hit and Run"
1961	Leave It to Beaver	Mr. Blair	Episode: "Beaver's English Test"
1962	Hazel	Mr. Wagner	Episode: "Hazel's Dog Days"
1962	Leave It to Beaver	Mr. Blair	Episode: "Farewell to Penny"
1962	Room for One More	Judge	Episode: "The Anniversary"
1962	Lawman	Frank MacStrowd	Episode: "The Barber"
1962	Alfred Hitchcock Presents	Sylvester Tupper	Season 7 Episode 34: "The Twelve Hour Caper" (final appearance)

== General bibliography ==
- Andreychuk, Ed. Burt Lancaster: A Filmography and Biography. McFarland, 2005.
- Presnell, Don and McGee, Marty. A Critical History of Television's The Twilight Zone, 1959–1964. McFarland, 2015.
- Terrace, Vincent. Radio Programs, 1924–1984: A Catalog of More Than 1800 Shows. McFarland, 2015.
