= The Flirt (1917 film) =

1917 film

- Directed by: Billy Gilbert
- Written by: H.M. Walker
- Produced by: Hal Roach
- Starring: Harold Lloyd
- Cinematography: Walter Lundin
- Edited by: Della Mullady
- Distributed by: Pathé Exchange
- Release date: November 11, 1917
- Country: United States
- Language: Silent (English intertitles)

The Flirt is a 1917 American short comedy film featuring Harold Lloyd. Copies of the film survive in the film archives of the Museum of Modern Art and the British Film Institute.

== Plot ==
Harold Lloyd plays an incorrigible skirt-chaser who follows a pretty girl from a park to her place of employment as a cashier in a restaurant. He orders a huge meal and then proceeds to get the waiter fired so he can take his place. In a short time Lloyd creates mayhem that annoys both the restaurant's customers and its kitchen staff. Lloyd eventually learns that the cashier is married to the proprietor of the restaurant. He then quickly leaves, sees another pretty girl, and follows her down the street.

== Cast ==
- Harold Lloyd
- Snub Pollard
- Bebe Daniels
- W.L. Adams
- Sammy Brooks
- Lottie Case
- Billy Evans
- Billy Fay (as William Fay)
- William Gillespie
- Sadie Gordon
- Charles Grider
- Max Hamburger
- Arthur Harrison
- Clyde E. Hopkins
- Oscar Larson
- Maynard Laswell (as M.A. Laswell)
- Gus Leonard
- Chris Lynton
- Belle Mitchell
- Hazel Powell
- Hazel Redmond
- Zetta Robson
- Dorothy Saulter
- Nina Speight
- William Strohbach (as William Strawback)
- Lillian Sylvester

== Reception ==
Like many American films of the time, The Flirt was subject to cuts by city and state film censorship boards. For example, the Chicago Board of Censors cut the scene of the waiter wiping a tray and his feet on the cook's posterior.

== See also ==
- List of American films of 1917
