= The Lamb (1918 film) =

1918 film

- Directed by: Harold Lloyd; Gilbert Pratt
- Produced by: Hal Roach
- Starring: Harold Lloyd
- Production company: Rolin Film Company
- Distributed by: Pathe Exchange
- Release date: February 3, 1918
- Running time: One reel
- Country: United States
- Language: Silent (English intertitles)

The Lamb is a 1918 American short comedy film starring Harold Lloyd. It is believed to be lost. Like many American films of the time, The Lamb was subject to cuts by city and state film censorship boards. The Chicago Board of Censors required cuts of the first, fourth, and sixth tough dancing scenes and of the men wiggling their backs in comedy duel scenes.

== Cast ==
- Harold Lloyd as The Boy
- Snub Pollard
- Bebe Daniels
- William Blaisdell
- Sammy Brooks
- Billy Fay
- Oscar Larson
- Gus Leonard
- Edith Sinclair
- William Strohbach (credited as William Strawback)
- Dorothea Wolbert

== See also ==
- List of lost films
