= The Tip (film) =

1918 film

- Directed by: Billy Gilbert; Gilbert Pratt
- Written by: H. M. Walker
- Produced by: Hal Roach
- Starring: Harold Lloyd
- Cinematography: Walter Lundin
- Edited by: Della Mullady
- Distributed by: Pathé Exchange
- Release date: January 6, 1918
- Running time: 10 minutes
- Country: United States
- Languages: Silent; English intertitles

The Tip is a 1918 American silent comedy short film featuring Harold Lloyd. Distributed by the Pathé Exchange, the film was released in US cinemas on January 6. The film was shown in France on March 7, 1919 under the title "Lui et la voyante". In the United States a re-edition was made to the film in 1921. Copies of the film are preserved in the archives of the International Museum of Photography and Film at the George Eastman Museum and in private collections.

== Cast ==
- Harold Lloyd
- Snub Pollard
- Bebe Daniels
- W.L. Adams
- William Blaisdell
- Sammy Brooks
- Harry Frick
- Marie Gilbert
- William Gillespie
- Max Hamburger
- Oscar Larson
- Gus Leonard
- Chris Lynton
- M.J. McCarthy
- Belle Mitchell
- Marie Mosquini
- Fred C. Newmeyer
- Lottie Novello
- Evelyn Page
- Hazel Powell
- Dorothy Saulter
- Nina Speight
- Charles Stevenson
- William Strohbach - (as William Strawback)
- Robert Van Meter
- Dorothea Wolbert
