= Rainbow Island (1917 film) =

1917 film

- Directed by: Billy Gilbert
- Written by: H. M. Walker
- Produced by: Hal Roach
- Starring: Harold Lloyd
- Cinematography: Walter Lundin
- Edited by: Della Mullady
- Release date: October 28, 1917
- Running time: 6 minutes
- Country: United States
- Language: Silent with English intertitles

Rainbow Island is a 1917 American short comedy film featuring Harold Lloyd. It is an extant film.

== Plot ==
While fishing in a rowboat, Harold and Snub find a message in a bottle. The paper contains a map of Rainbow Island with an X indicating buried treasure. When they row to the island in search of the treasure, they are quickly captured by a tribe of cannibals.

== Cast ==
- Harold Lloyd
- Snub Pollard
- Bebe Daniels
- Frank Alexander
- Carl Barbesgaard
- William Blaisdell
- Sammy Brooks
- Walter Crompton
- Billy Evans
- Billy Fay (as William Fay)
- Max Hamburger
- Oscar Larson
- Gus Leonard
- Belle Mitchell
- Fred C. Newmeyer
- Hazel Powell
- Hazel Redmond
- Gertrude Smith
- Nina Speight
