= Clubs Are Trump =

1917 film

- Directed by: Hal Roach
- Written by: H. M. Walker
- Produced by: Hal Roach
- Starring: Harold Lloyd
- Release date: November 18, 1917
- Running time: 25 minutes
- Country: United States
- Languages: Silent; English intertitles

Clubs Are Trump is a 1917 American silent comedy short film featuring Harold Lloyd.

== Plot ==
Harold Lloyd and Snub Pollard are "two famous lascars" who annoy several wooing couples in a public park. Eventually their antics enrage a large suitor who violently tosses them into a shallow lake. Lloyd and Pollard emerge from the lake and fall asleep on a park bench where they simultaneously dream of living in caveman times.

While there, they try to woo a royal harem and run afoul of the caveman king and his club-swinging minions. Lloyd and Pollard divert their pursuers into a pond where a crocodile resides and have the harem to themselves. As they embrace the females, they both wake up on the park bench embracing each other. A park policeman breaks up their embrace. Lloyd and Snub eventually trap the policemen in the crook of a low tree, but are soon on the run from dozens more officers of the law.

== Cast ==
- Harold Lloyd as The Boy
- Snub Pollard
- Bebe Daniels
- Gilbert Pratt
- Fred C. Newmeyer
- Billy Fay
- Bud Jamison
- Charles Stevenson (as Charles E. Stevenson)
- Sammy Brooks
- David Voorhees
- Virginia Baynes
- Ruth Rowan
- Grace McLernon
- Ruth Churchill

== See also ==
- List of American films of 1917
- Harold Lloyd filmography
