= Are Crooks Dishonest? =

1918 film

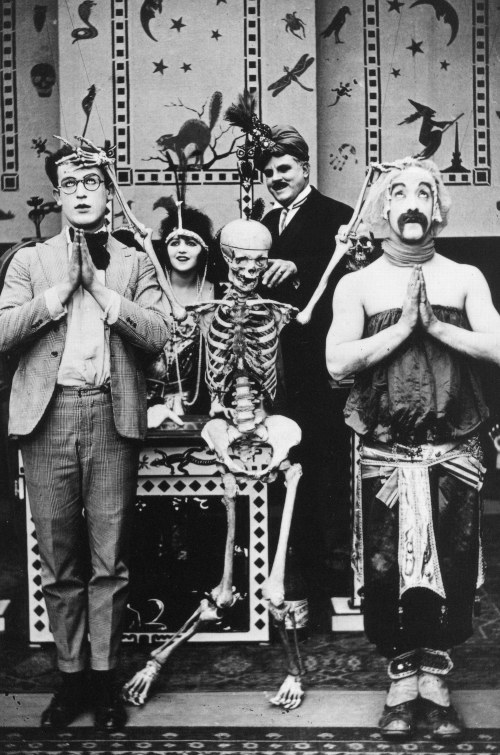
- Directed by: Gilbert Pratt (as Gil Pratt)
- Produced by: Hal Roach
- Starring: Harold Lloyd
- Release date: June 23, 1918
- Running time: 13 minutes
- Country: United States
- Languages: Silent; English intertitles

Are Crooks Dishonest?

Are Crooks Dishonest? is a 1918 American short comedy film featuring Harold Lloyd. Prints of the film survive in the film archives of The Museum of Modern Art and Filmoteca Española.

== Plot ==
Con artists Harold (Harold Lloyd) and Snub (Snub Pollard) try to con the "not easily outwitted" Miss Goulash (Bebe Daniels) and her father.

== Cast ==
- Harold Lloyd as Harold
- Bebe Daniels as Miss Goulash
- Snub Pollard as Snub (credited as Harry Pollard)
- William Blaisdell
- Sammy Brooks
- Lige Conley
- William Gillespie
- Helen Gilmore as Old lady in park
- Lew Harvey
- Gus Leonard as Old man in park
- Charles Stevenson (credited as C.E. Stevenson)

== See also ==
- Harold Lloyd filmography
