= Franklin Parker =

American actor

- Franklin Parker in Two Seconds 1932
- Born: November 8, 1902; Fillmore, Missouri, United States
- Died: June 12, 1962 (aged 59); Hollywood, California, United States
- Occupation: Actor
- Years active: 1931–1955

Franklin Parker (November 8, 1902 – June 12, 1962), also known as Frank Parker or Franklyn Parker, was an American character actor who appeared in over 100 films during his twenty-five year career. Born in Fillmore, Missouri on November 8, 1902, he began his show business career on the vaudeville and Broadway stages, where he proved himself an admirable singer. During those years he would often be billed as Pinky. His final screen performance was on television, on The Donna Reed Show in 1961, where he was credited as Franklin Pinky Parker. His film career included appearances in such classic films as They Were Expendable, It's a Wonderful Life, Mr. Blandings Builds His Dream House, Mighty Joe Young, and Pat and Mike. Occasionally he would have a larger role, such as the lead in the 1935 film, Sweet Surrender.

== Filmography ==
(Per AFI database)

- Millie (1931) as Spring
- Two Seconds (1932) as Reporter
- Behind Jury Doors (1932) as Casey
- Honor of the Press (1932) as Sorrell Simpson
- The All American (1932) - Radio announcer
- Frisco Jenny (1933) as Martel
- Blood Money (1933) as man in district attorney's office
- Hell and High Water (1933) (uncredited)
- The Past of Mary Holmes (1933) as Brooks
- He Couldn't Take It (1933) as Radio announcer
- Her Resale Value (1933) as Truex
- Picture Brides (1933) as Bill
- Operator 13 (1934) as John Hay
- When Strangers Meet (1934) as Ed. Mason
- Transatlantic Merry-Go-Round (1934) as Frank
- Woman Unafraid (1934) as Henchman Randall
- No More Women (1934) as Reporter
- Chained (1934) as Third mate
- I'll Tell the World (1934) as News editor
- Romance in the Rain (1934) as Master of ceremonies
- Let 'Em Have It (1935) as Mike
- The Woman in Red (1935) as Reporter
- It Happened in New York (1935) as Reporter
- Sweet Surrender (1935) as Danny O'Day
- Straight from the Heart (1935) as Reporter
- Manhattan Moon (1935)
- The Return of Jimmy Valentine (1936) as Grogan
- Fury (1936) as Cameraman
- The Preview Murder Mystery (1936) as Cutter
- I'd Give My Life (1936) (uncredited)
- Small Town Girl (1936) as Reporter
- F-Man (1936) as Craig
- Career Woman (1936) as Reporter—Clarkdale
- Hollywood Boulevard (1936) as Workman—Brown Derby
- Anything Goes (1936) as Reporter
- Born to Dance (1936) as Reporter
- Crash Donovan (1936) as Peanut vendor
- The Gorgeous Hussy (1936) as Leader of mob
- All American Chump (1936) as Photographer
- Charlie Chan on Broadway (1937) as Reporter
- Wells Fargo (1937) as Reporter
- Angel's Holiday (1937) as Reporter
- Night Club Scandal (1937) as Reporter
- I Cover the War (1937) as Parker
- Borrowing Trouble (1937) as Harris
- True Confession (1937) as Reporter
- Time Out for Romance (1937) as Reporter
- Mr. Moto's Gamble (1938) as Reporter
- Joy of Living (1938) as Producer
- Too Hot to Handle (1938) as Attendant
- Walking Down Broadway (1938) as Photographer
- Give Me a Sailor (1938) as Reporter
- The Higgins Family (1938) as Reynard
- Trade Winds (1938) as Detective Squad member
- Sinners in Paradise (1938) as Operator
- Men with Wings (1938) as Mail truck driver
- Cipher Bureau (1938) as Announcer
- Young Dr. Kildare (1938) as Reporter
- Eternally Yours (1939) as Croupier
- Unmarried (1939) as Announcer
- Invitation to Happiness (1939) as Reporter
- The Man They Could Not Hang (1939) as Second reporter
- The Spirit of Culver (1939) as Railroad ticket agent
- Little Accident (1939) as Cameraman
- Queen of the Mob (1940) as Filling station attendant
- The Man Who Wouldn't Talk (1940) as Reporter
- Harmon of Michigan (1941) as Bates
- Lucky Legs (1942) as Real estate salesman
- Corvette K-225 (1943) as Captain
- The Good Fellows (1943) as Davis
- Salute for Three (1943) as Radio official
- The Impostor (1944) as Cashier
- Follow the Boys (1944) as man in office
- Ladies Courageous (1944) as Steward
- Slightly Terrific (1944) as Marty
- Three of a Kind (1944) as McGinty
- Wilson (1944) as Reporter
- Captain Eddie (1945) as Shelby
- The Dolly Sisters (1945) as Reporter
- I'll Tell the World (1945) as Character
- See My Lawyer (1945) as Bailiff
- Sunset in El Dorado (1945) as Conductor
- They Were Expendable (1945) as Navy officer
- The Blue Dahlia (1946) as Police stenographer
- The Man Who Dared (1946) as Andy White
- It's a Wonderful Life (1946) as Reporter (uncredited)
- Blaze of Noon (1947) as Jenkins
- Living in a Big Way (1947) as Reporter
- Suddenly, It's Spring (1947) as Reporter
- The Senator Was Indiscreet (1948) as Reporter
- Good Sam (1948) as Photographer
- Mickey (1948) as Cathy's father
- Mr. Blandings Builds His Dream House (1948) as Simpson
- On an Island with You (1948) as Lieutenant technical advisor
- Abandoned (1949) as Plainclothesman
- That Wonderful Urge (1949) as Reporter
- Mighty Joe Young (1949) as Photographer
- Tell It to the Judge (1949) as Outgoing reporter
- The Undercover Man (1949) as Minor Role (uncredited)
- Yes Sir, That's My Baby (1949) as State coach
- The Jackpot (1950) as Poker player
- Tales of the West 1 (1950) as Pete Green
- Abbott and Costello Meet the Invisible Man (1951) as Photographer
- Ace in the Hole (1951) as Reporter
- All That I Have (1951) as Joe, Rewrite Man
- Close to My Heart (1951) as Clerk
- Come Fill the Cup (1951) as Bald man
- Lightning Strikes Twice (1951) as Guard
- Flesh and Fury (1952) as Inspector
- The Narrow Margin (1952) as Telegraph attendant
- Pat and Mike (1952)
- Bugles in the Afternoon (1952) as Minor Role (uncredited)
- The Mississippi Gambler (1953) as Bartender
- Paris Follies of 1956 (1955) as himself
