= Lonesome Luke's Wild Women =

1917 film

- Directed by: Hal Roach
- Produced by: Hal Roach
- Starring: Harold Lloyd
- Production company: Rolin Films
- Distributed by: Pathé Exchange
- Release date: September 2, 1917
- Running time: 2 reels
- Country: United States
- Language: Silent (English intertitles)

Lonesome Luke's Wild Women is a 1917 American silent comedy short film starring Harold Lloyd. A print of the film exists in a collection.

== Cast ==
- Harold Lloyd as Lonesome Luke
- Bebe Daniels
- Snub Pollard
- Bud Jamison
- Sammy Brooks
- W.L. Adams
- David Voorhees
- Charles Stevenson - (as Charles E. Stevenson)
- Billy Fay
- Sandy Roth
- Margaret Joslin - (as Margaret Joslin Todd)
- Fred C. Newmeyer
- Gilbert Pratt
- Max Hamburger
- Gus Leonard
- Marie Mosquini
- Dorothea Wolbert

== Production ==
Lonesome Luke's Wild Women was filmed on Deadman's Island off San Pedro, Los Angeles, California, which was later removed in 1928 as part of a harbor development effort.

== Reception ==
Like many American films of the time, Lonesome Luke's Wild Women was subject to cuts by city and state film censorship boards. The Chicago Board of Censors required a cut in the first vision scene of the harem girls in transparent trousers.

== See also ==
- Harold Lloyd filmography
