= Billy Gilbert (silent film actor) =

American actor and director (1891–1961)

Billy Gilbert (born William V. Campbell; September 15, 1891, in Hollywood, California – April 29, 1961) was involved in more 150 American films between 1913 and 1936, working as either an actor, extra, or director.

This Billy Gilbert should not be confused with the later film actor Billy Gilbert (born William Gilbert Barron), who became well known working for Hal Roach Studios in the 1930s. That "later" Gilbert's acting career in both short subjects and feature films continued into the early 1960s. The Billy Gilbert relevant to this page spent his entire career working almost exclusively in shorts, often uncredited. His last film appearance, again uncredited, was in F-Man, a comedy released by Paramount Pictures in May 1936.

== Selected filmography ==
=== As actor ===
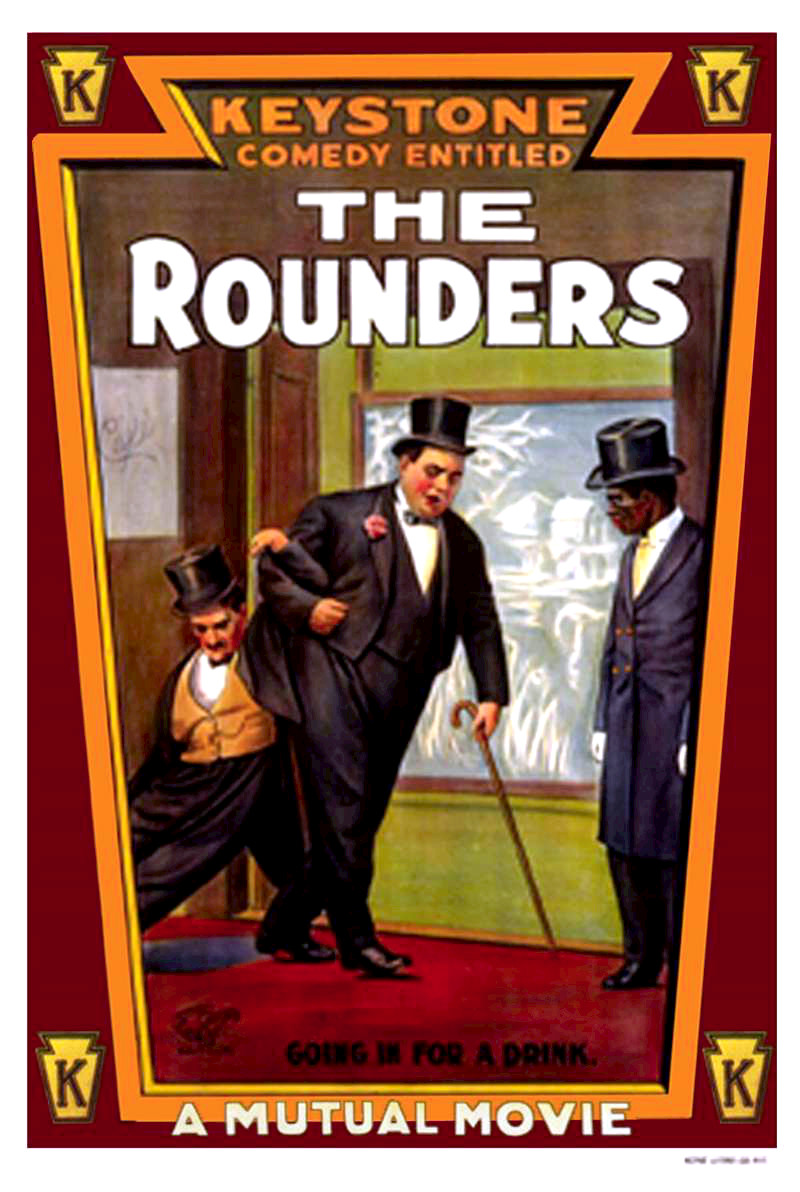
Poster for The Rounders (1914) with Gilbert as doorman in blackface

- Fatty Joins the Force (1913)
- Fatty at San Diego (1914)
- Fatty's Wine Party (1914)
- The Star Boarder (1914)
- Making a Living (1914)
- The Rounders (1914), directed and written by Charlie Chaplin
- Mabel's Strange Predicament (1914)
- A Film Johnnie (1914)
- A Busy Day (1914)
- Caught in a Cabaret (1914)
- Tillie's Punctured Romance (1914) as Policeman (uncredited)
- Miss Fatty's Seaside Lovers (1915)
- Oh, Mabel Behave (1922)
- Give Us This Night (1936)
- F-Man (1936)

=== As director ===
- Move On (1917) with Harold Lloyd
- The Flirt (1917) with Harold Lloyd
- Rainbow Island (1917) with Harold Lloyd
- The Tip (1918) with Harold Lloyd
