= Move On (1917 film) =

1917 film

- Directed by: Billy Gilbert; Gilbert Pratt
- Written by: H. M. Walker
- Produced by: Hal Roach
- Starring: Harold Lloyd
- Cinematography: Walter Lundin
- Release date: December 9, 1917
- Running time: 5 minutes
- Country: United States
- Languages: Silent; English intertitles

Move On is a 1917 American silent comedy short film featuring Harold Lloyd. A print survives in the Museum of Modern Art film archive.

== Plot ==
Harold plays a policeman who gets into a series of misadventures while patrolling a park. He runs afoul of his superior while attempting to woo the man's nanny while on duty.

== Cast ==
- Harold Lloyd as Chester Fields
- Snub Pollard
- Bebe Daniels
- W.L. Adams
- William Blaisdell
- Sammy Brooks
- Marie Gilbert
- William Gillespie
- Max Hamburger
- Bud Jamison
- Oscar Larson
- Maynard Laswell (as M.A. Laswell)
- Gus Leonard
- Chris Lynton
- M.J. McCarthy
- Susan Miller
- Belle Mitchell
- Fred C. Newmeyer
- Charles Stevenson
