= Adrienne Marden =

American actress (1909–1978)

- Marden as Edith Wilson in Birdman of Alcatraz (1962)
- Born: Mabel Adrienne Baruch; September 2, 1909; Cleveland, Ohio, U.S.
- Died: November 9, 1978 (aged 69); Los Angeles, California, U.S.
- Education: University of Michigan
- Occupation: Actress
- Years active: 1932–1978 (film & TV)
- Spouse: Whit Bissell (m. 1938; div. 1953) Wendell Holmes (m. 1956; died 1962)
- Children: 2

Adrienne Marden (born Mabel Adrienne Baruch, September 2, 1909 – November 9, 1978 ) was an American film and television actress.

== Early years ==
Marden was born in Cleveland, Ohio, the daughter of Lenore (Stein) and Ralph Baruch. Marden attended the University of Michigan, where she was active in dramatics.

== Career ==
Marden gained early acting experience in stock theater companies in Cleveland. She also directed musicals in some small towns in Ohio before moving to California and joining the Pasadena Playhouse.

One of Marden's first film roles was playing a czar's daughter in Rasputin and the Empress (1932), in which she was billed as Mabel Marden.

Marden debuted on Broadway in Merrily We Roll Along (1934). Her other Broadway credits include Hickory Stick (1943), The American Way (1938), and The Women (1936).

In 1935, Marden would appear at Elitch Theatre in the Summer Stock cast.

On radio, Marden had the role of Patricia Jordan on The Story of Bess Johnson and was on the American Drama School of the Air. From the 1950s thru the 1970s, Marden made several guest appearances on television.

== Personal life ==
Marden and actor Whit Bissell were married on November 23, 1938, and divorced on September 17, 1953.

On August 12, 1956, Marden married actor Wendell Holmes in Santa Monica, California.

== Filmography ==
Year	Title	Role	Notes
1932	Rasputin and the Empress	Minor Role	Uncredited
1933	Only Yesterday	Helen	
1934	Madame Spy	Luler	
1935	Millions in the Air	Girl	
1936	13 Hours by Air	Ann McKenna, Stewardess	
1936	F-Man	Molly Carter	
1936	Star for a Night	Katherine Lind	
1947	Gentleman's Agreement		Uncredited
1948	For the Love of Mary	Hilda	
1951	The Company She Keeps	Amy Bower	Uncredited
1951	Payment on Demand	Mrs. Garrin	Uncredited
1951	Utah Wagon Train	Mrs. Belle Hatfield	
1951	Superman and the Mole Men	Nurse Ronson	Uncredited
1952	The Sniper	Woman	Uncredited
1953	Dangerous Crossing	Operator	Uncredited
1953	Inferno	Emory's Secretary	Uncredited
1955	The Shrike	Miss Raymond	
1955	One Desire	Marjorie Huggins	
1955	Count Three and Pray	Mrs. Swallow	Uncredited
1956	Man from Del Rio	Mrs. Tillman	Uncredited
1956	The Great Man	Fran Fuller	Voice, Uncredited
1957	The Walter Winchell File	Marie Yancich	TV series, 1 episode
1959	The Sound and the Fury	Effie Mansfield, Maud's Old Maid Daughter	Uncredited
1959	Perry Mason	Barbara Slater	S2E13 "The Case of the Borrowed Brunette"
1960	This Rebel Breed	Mrs. Drake	Uncredited
1960	Alfred Hitchcock Presents	Mildred	Season 6 Episode 11: "The Man with Two Faces"
1962	Walk on the Wild Side	Eva Gerard	(scenes deleted)
1962	Birdman of Alcatraz	Edith Wilson	Uncredited
1962	The Interns	Dead Child's Mother	Uncredited
1963	The Wheeler Dealers	Art Gallery Patron	Uncredited
1964	Kisses for My President	Miss Higgins	
1970	Airport	Mrs. Gertrude Cochran, Passenger	Uncredited

== Bibliography ==
- Pitts, Michael R. Western Movies: A Guide to 5,105 Feature Films. McFarland, 2012.
