= F-Man =

1936 film by Edward F. Cline

- Directed by: Edward F. Cline
- Screenplay by: Richard Connell; Henry Johnson; Paul Gerard Smith; Eddie Welch
- Produced by: Val Paul
- Starring: Jack Haley; William Frawley; Grace Bradley; Adrienne Marden; Onslow Stevens; Franklin Parker
- Cinematography: Leo Tover
- Edited by: Paul Weatherwax
- Production company: Paramount Pictures
- Distributed by: Paramount Pictures
- Release date: May 2, 1936
- Running time: 62 minutes
- Country: United States
- Language: English

F-Man is a 1936 American comedy film directed by Edward F. Cline and written by Richard Connell, Henry Johnson, Paul Gerard Smith and Eddie Welch. The film stars Jack Haley, William Frawley, Grace Bradley, Adrienne Marden, Onslow Stevens and Franklin Parker. The film was released on May 2, 1936, by Paramount Pictures.

== Plot ==
Johnny Dime goes to California determined to become a government agent. He ends up a soda jerk instead, then lies to sweetheart Molly Carter when she follows him west, claiming he is working undercover.

Hogan, a detective, can't help him become a "G-Man" so he bestows a fake title, F-Man, on the gullible Johnny. He becomes annoyed when Johnny accidentally interferes with his own undercover operation, trying to bring gangster Shaw to justice. Johnny ends up getting himself shot and wounded, but apprehends Shaw with a fake gun and becomes a hero by sheer luck.

== Cast ==
- Jack Haley as Johnny Dime
- William Frawley as Detective Hogan
- Grace Bradley as Evelyn
- Adrienne Marden as Molly Carter
- Onslow Stevens as Mr. Shaw
- Franklin Parker as Craig
- Norman Willis as Jerry
- Edward McWade as Mr. Whitney
- Robert Middlemass as Chief Cartwright
- Walter Johnson as Dougherty
- Spencer Charters as Sheriff Hank 'One Gun' Groder
- Billy Gilbert (uncredited)
