= Gilbert Pratt =

American film director (1892–1954)

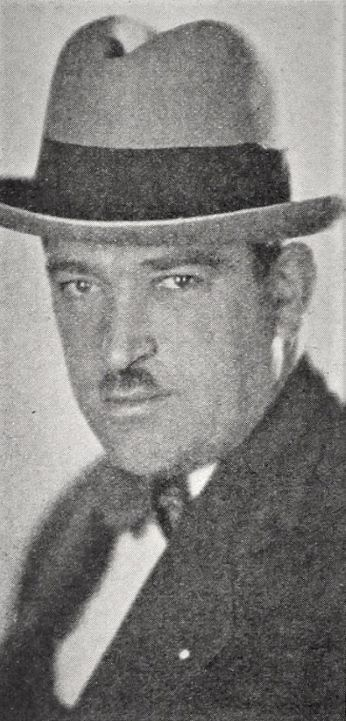
- From a 1926 magazine
- Born: February 16, 1892; Providence, Rhode Island, U.S.
- Died: December 10, 1954 (aged 62); Los Angeles County, California, U.S.
- Occupations: Film director, actor
- Years active: 1917-1936

Gilbert Pratt (February 16, 1892 – December 10, 1954) was an American film director, actor, and writer. He directed 87 films between 1917 and 1936 and was often credited as Gil Pratt. He was born in Providence, Rhode Island, and died in Los Angeles, California.

== Selected filmography ==
- The Big Idea (1917)
- Move On (1917)
- We Never Sleep (1917)
- Clubs Are Trump (1917)
- Love, Laughs and Lather (1917)
- From Laramie to London (1917)
- Birds of a Feather (1917)
- Lonesome Luke Loses Patients (1917)
- Lonesome Luke's Wild Women (1917)
- Lonesome Luke, Messenger (1917)
- Stop! Luke! Listen! (1917)
- Lonesome Luke, Plumber (1917)
- Lonesome Luke's Honeymoon (1917)
- Lonesome Luke on Tin Can Alley (1917)
- Hear 'Em Rave (1918)
- Bees in His Bonnet (1918)
- Two Scrambled (1918)
- That's Him (1918)
- Are Crooks Dishonest? (1918)
- Sic 'Em, Towser (1918)
- The City Slicker (1918)
- The Non-Stop Kid (1918)
- It's a Wild Life (1918)
- Beat It (1918)
- Hit Him Again (1918)
- The Lamb (1918)
- The Tip (1918)
- Flips and Flops (1919)
- Going! Going! Gone! (1919)
- Wanted - $5,000 (1919)
- Mud and Sand (1922)
- The Egg (1922)
- Keep Smiling (1925)
- Partners in Crime (1928)
- The Big Killing (1928)
- Just Married (1928)
- The Farmer's Daughter (1928)
- Law of the North (1932)
- Elmer and Elsie (1934)
- Timothy's Quest (1936)
- Boys Will Be Girls (1937)
- Saps at Sea (1940)
- If a Body Meets a Body (1945)
- Beer Barrel Polecats (1946)
