= Hit Him Again =

1918 film

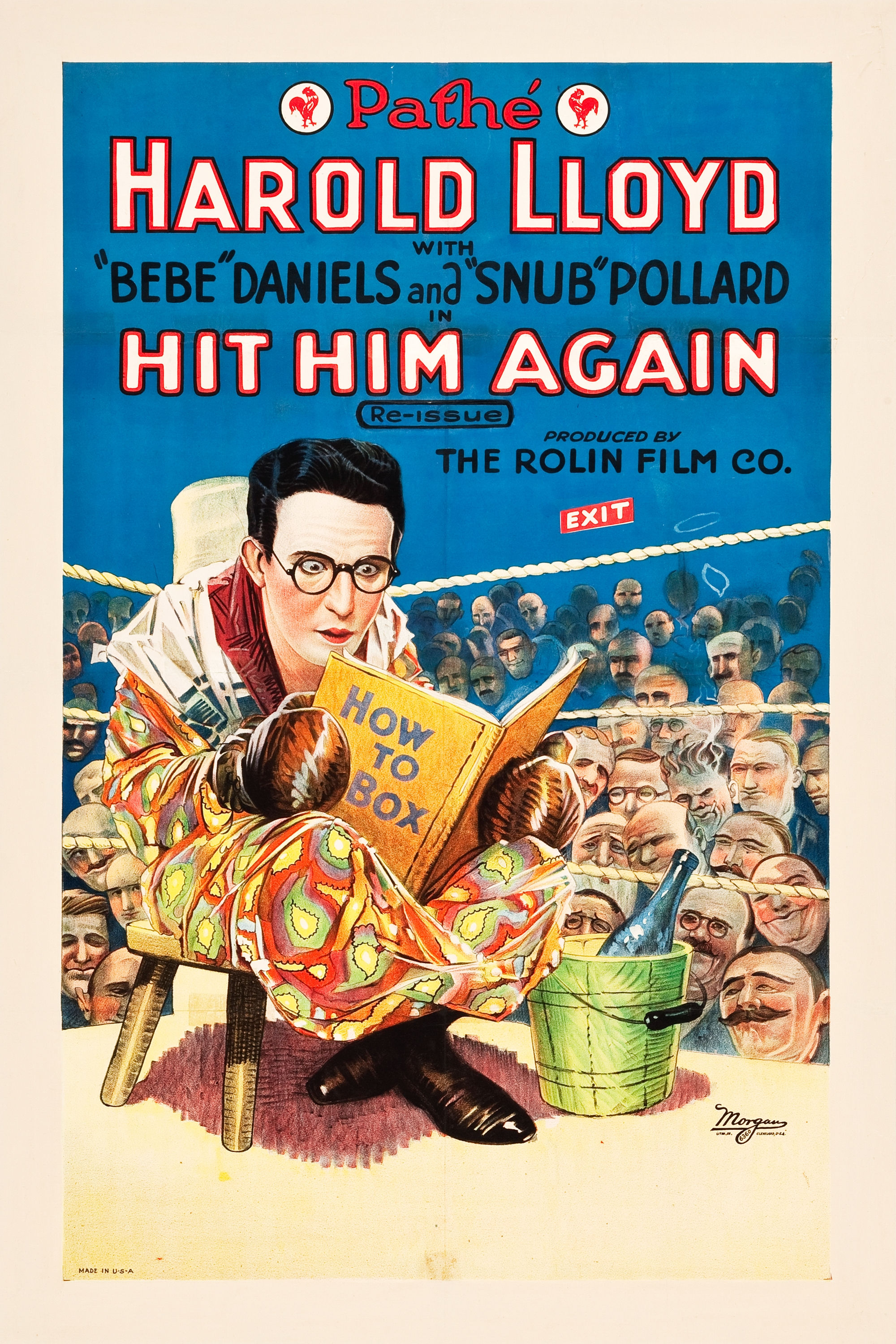
- Film poster
- Directed by: Gilbert Pratt
- Written by: H. M. Walker
- Produced by: Hal Roach
- Starring: Harold Lloyd
- Cinematography: Walter Lundin
- Production company: Rolin Film Company
- Distributed by: Pathé Exchange
- Release date: February 17, 1918
- Running time: 10 minutes
- Country: United States
- Language: Silent with English intertitles

Hit Him Again is a 1918 American short comedy film featuring Harold Lloyd. This is now considered to be a lost film.

== Cast ==
- Harold Lloyd as The Boy
- Snub Pollard
- Bebe Daniels
- William Blaisdell
- Sammy Brooks
- Lige Conley (credited as Lige Cromley)
- Billy Fay
- Lew Harvey
- Gus Leonard
- James Parrott
- King Zany (credited as Charles Dill)

== See also ==
- Harold Lloyd filmography
- List of lost films
