= Colin Kenny (actor) =

Irish-American actor (1888–1968)

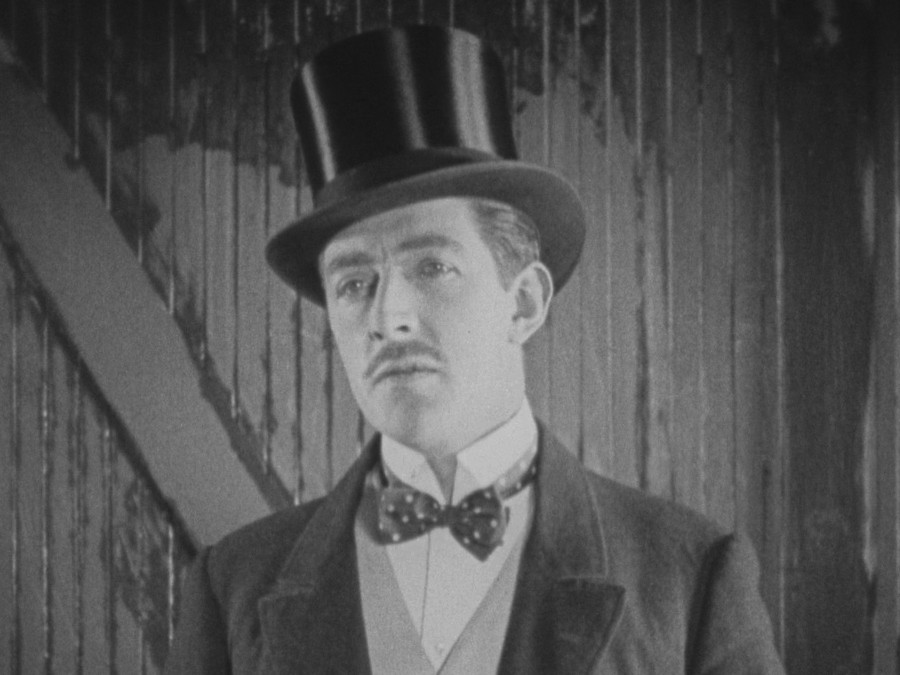
- Kenny in The Egg (1922)
- Born: 4 December 1888; Dublin, County Dublin, Ireland
- Died: 2 December 1968 (aged 79); Los Angeles, California, U.S.
- Occupation: Actor
- Years active: 1918–1967

Colin Kenny (4 December 1888 – 2 December 1968) was an Irish film actor. He appeared in 260 films between 1918 and 1965. He was born in Dublin, Ireland and died in Los Angeles, California. Kenny was educated in England and left London to come to the United States in 1917.

== Selected filmography ==
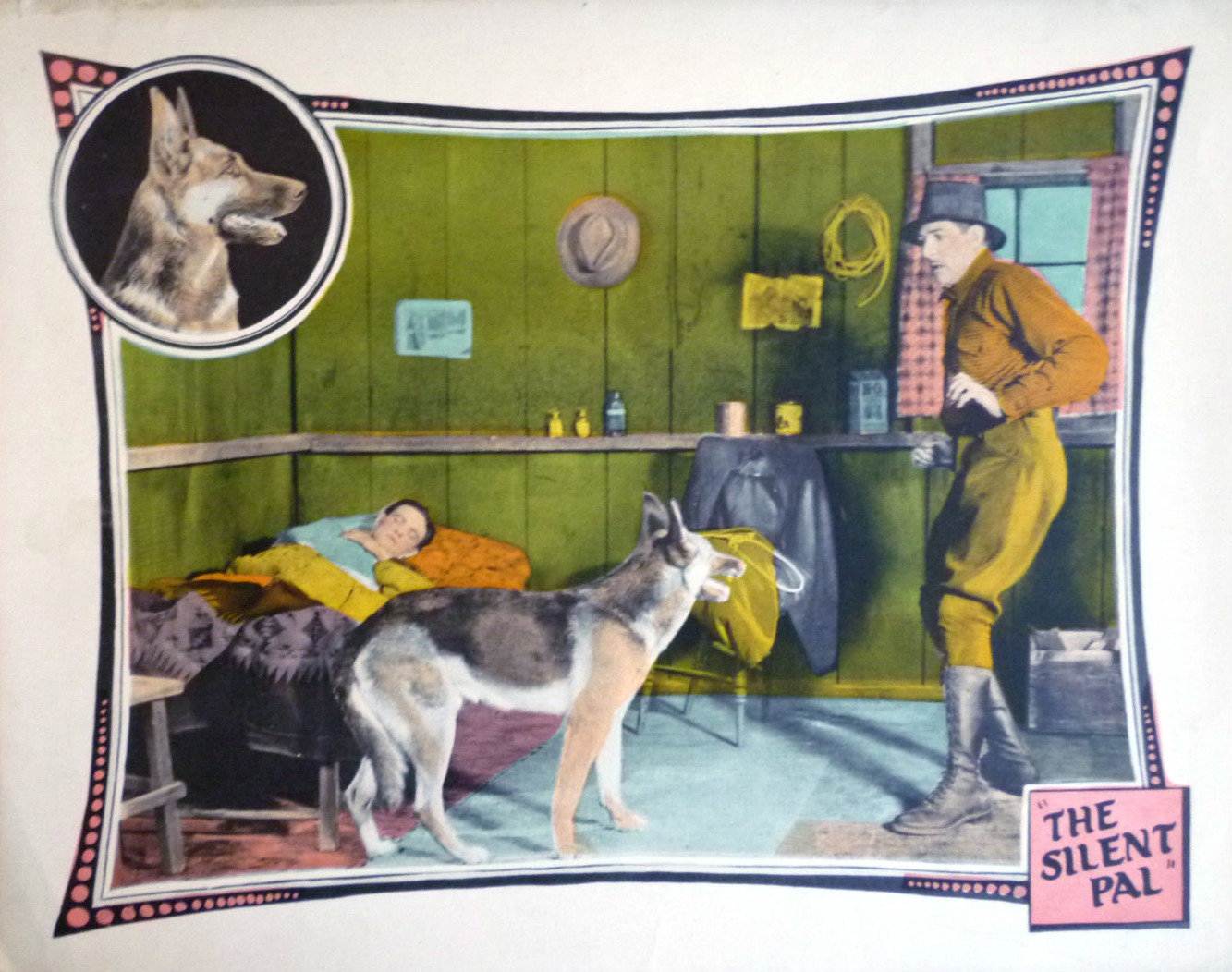
Kenny (right) in lobby card for The Silent Pal (1925)

- Tarzan of the Apes (1918) - William Cecil Clayton
- The Romance of Tarzan (1918) - Clayton
- Unexpected Places (1918) - Lord Harold Varden
- The Romance of Tarzan (1918) - Clayton
- The Wishing Ring Man (1919) - Allen Harrington
- Upstairs (1919) - George
- The Girl from Outside (1919) - The Magpie
- Toby's Bow (1919) - Bainbridge
- The Triflers (1920) - Mr. Whitaker
- The Last Straw (1920) - Dick Hilton
- Blind Youth (1920) - Henry Monnier
- Darling Mine (1920)
- 813 (1920) - Gerard Beaupre
- Black Beauty (1921) - George Gordon
- Hearts of Youth (1921) - Lord Vincent
- The Fighting Lover (1921) - Vic Ragner
- Little Lord Fauntleroy (1921) - Bevis
- Watch Your Step (1922) - Jack Allen
- Seeing's Believing (1922) - Mr. Reed
- They Like 'Em Rough (1922) - Waddie
- The Ladder Jinx (1922) - Richard Twing
- The Egg (1922, Short) - Gerald Stone
- The Weak-End Party (1922, Short) - Monocle Charley
- Her Dangerous Path (1923) - Stanley Fleming
- Dorothy Vernon of Haddon Hall (1924) - Dawson
- Silent Pal (1925) - Randall Phillips
- Adam's Apple (1928) - Husband
- The Clue of the New Pin (1929) - Insp. Carver
- Grumpy (1930) - Dawson
- Movie Crazy (1932) - Man Leaving Men's Room (uncredited)
- Afraid to Talk (1932) - Dignitary on Dais (uncredited)
- Cynara (1932) - Officer at Inquest (uncredited)
- The Kiss Before the Mirror (1933) - Court Clerk (uncredited)
- One Man's Journey (1933) - Doctor at Banquet
- Design for Living (1933) - Theatre Patron (uncredited)
- Alice in Wonderland (1933) - The Clock (uncredited)
- Long Lost Father (1934) - Nightclub Patron (uncredited)
- The Mystery of Mr. X (1934) - Constable (uncredited)
- Sisters Under the Skin (1934) - Attendant
- The World Moves On (1934) - Officer at Wedding Reception (uncredited)
- One More River (1934) - Minor Role (uncredited)
- The Party's Over (1934) - Elevator Starter (uncredited)
- A Lost Lady (1934) - Ormsby's Butler (uncredited)
- The Painted Veil (1934) - Englishman (uncredited)
- Limehouse Blues (1934) - Minor Role (uncredited)
- The Man Who Reclaimed His Head (1934) - French Citizen (uncredited)
- Clive of India (1935) - Old Soldier (uncredited)
- Black Sheep (1935) - Ship's Officer (uncredited)
- Bonnie Scotland (1935) - Black Watch Officer (uncredited)
- The Dark Angel (1935) - Officer at Station (uncredited)
- Charlie Chan in Shanghai (1935) - Reporter (uncredited)
- Kind Lady (1935) - Scotland Yard man #2 (uncredited)
- Captain Blood (1935) - Lord Chester Dyke
- Till We Meet Again (1936) - English Artillery Officer (uncredited)
- Charlie Chan at the Race Track (1936) - Judge (uncredited)
- Thank You, Jeeves! (1936) - Burton (uncredited)
- The Charge of the Light Brigade (1936) - Maj. Anderson (uncredited)
- The Plough and the Stars (1936) - Minor Role (uncredited)
- Maid of Salem (1937) - Hunter (uncredited)
- The Prince and the Pauper (1937) - Watchman #2 (uncredited)
- London by Night (1937) - Scotland Yard Detective (uncredited)
- Souls at Sea (1937) - Military Guard (uncredited)
- The Firefly (1937) - English General (uncredited)
- Bulldog Drummond Comes Back (1937) - Policeman (uncredited)
- Bulldog Drummond's Revenge (1937) - Henchman (uncredited)
- Murder Is News (1937) - Inspector Fitzgerald
- The Adventures of Robin Hood (1938) - Sir Baldwin
- Kidnapped (1938) - Clansman (uncredited)
- Booloo (1938) - Radio operator
- Mysterious Mr. Moto (1938) - Phony Policeman (uncredited)
- A Christmas Carol (1938) - (uncredited)
- Torchy Blane in Chinatown (1939) - Mourner at Burial Service (uncredited)
- The Gracie Allen Murder Case (1939) - Nightclub Patron (uncredited)
- Man About Town (1939) - English Bobby in Fog (uncredited)
- The Oregon Trail (1939, Serial) - Slade - Morgan Henchman
- Pack Up Your Troubles (1939) - Capt. Benson (uncredited)
- Raffles (1939) - Bobby (uncredited)
- Tower of London (1939) - Soldier (uncredited)
- We Are Not Alone (1939) - George
- The Light That Failed (1939) - Doctor #2 (uncredited)
- The Earl of Chicago (1940) - Sergeant (uncredited)
- The Green Hornet (1940, Serial) - Police Dispatcher (uncredited)
- The Invisible Man Returns (1940) - Plainclothesman (uncredited)
- Vigil in the Night (1940) - Court Bailiff (uncredited)
- The House of the Seven Gables (1940) - Court Bailiff (uncredited)
- The Sea Hawk (1940) - Officer (uncredited)
- The Man I Married (1940) - Reporter at Nazi Rally (uncredited)
- Captain Caution (1940) - Jim - English Ship's Brig Officer (uncredited)
- Foreign Correspondent (1940) - Doctor (uncredited)
- City for Conquest (1940) - Al's Pal (uncredited)
- South of Suez (1940) - Gatekeeper (uncredited)
- Free and Easy (1941) - Gambler (uncredited)
- Rage in Heaven (1941) - Restaurant Patron / Court Bailiff (uncredited)
- Scotland Yard (1941) - Air Raid Warden (uncredited)
- Ziegfeld Girl (1941) - Croupier (uncredited)
- Dr. Jekyll and Mr. Hyde (1941) - Constable (uncredited)
- Confirm or Deny (1941) - Minor Role (uncredited)
- On the Sunny Side (1942) - BBC Radio Technician (uncredited)
- This Above All (1942) - WAAF Supply Officer (uncredited)
- Mrs. Miniver (1942) - Policeman (uncredited)
- Eagle Squadron (1942) - Fire Warden (uncredited)
- The Pride of the Yankees (1942) - Yankee Player on Train (uncredited)
- Tales of Manhattan (1942) - Concertgoer (Laughton sequence) (uncredited)
- Destination Unknown (1942) - Hotel clerk (uncredited)
- Thunder Birds (1942) - Townsman (uncredited)
- Journey for Margaret (1942) - Steward (uncredited)
- Random Harvest (1942) - Workman (uncredited)
- Sherlock Holmes and the Secret Weapon (1942) - Scotland Yard Detective (uncredited)
- Keeper of the Flame (1943) - Reporter (uncredited)
- Sherlock Holmes in Washington (1943) - Hotel Doorman (uncredited)
- Mission to Moscow (1943) - Parade Soldier Spectator (uncredited)
- The Leopard Man (1943) - Nightclub Patron (uncredited)
- Two Tickets to London (1943) - Gordon (uncredited)
- The Constant Nymph (1943) - Party Guest (uncredited)
- Best Foot Forward (1943) - Party Guest (uncredited)
- The Falcon and the Co-eds (1943) - Audience Member at Bluecliff Festival (uncredited)
- Around the World (1943) - Dock Worker (uncredited)
- The Heat's On (1943) - Nightclub Patron (uncredited)
- The Lodger (1944) - Plainclothesman (uncredited)
- Up in Arms (1944) - Theatre Patron (uncredited)
- Ministry of Fear (1944) - Scotland Yard Man (uncredited)
- Meet the People (1944) - Boat Christening Witness (uncredited)
- The Canterville Ghost (1944) - Nobleman (uncredited)
- The Pearl of Death (1944) - Security Guard (uncredited)
- None but the Lonely Heart (1944) - Policeman Outside (uncredited)
- The Princess and the Pirate (1944) - First Mate on the 'Mary Ann' (uncredited)
- Jungle Queen (1945, Serial) - Constable (uncredited)
- Boston Blackie Booked on Suspicion (1945) - Book Auction Customer (uncredited)
- The Brighton Strangler (1945) - Inspector (uncredited)
- Week-End at the Waldorf (1945) - Party Guest (uncredited)
- The Dolly Sisters (1945) - Speakeasy Table Member (uncredited)
- Kitty (1945) - Mr. Thickness (uncredited)
- She Went to the Races (1945) - Racetrack Spectator (uncredited)
- The Stork Club (1945) - Nightclub Patron (uncredited)
- Three Strangers (1946) - Alfred - Innkeeper / Bartender (uncredited)
- Terror by Night (1946) - Constable (uncredited)
- Deadline at Dawn (1946) - Birthday Party Table Guest (uncredited)
- The Kid from Brooklyn (1946) - Minor Role (uncredited)
- The Green Years (1946) - Registrar (uncredited)
- Two Sisters from Boston (1946) - Opera Patron (uncredited)
- The Dark Corner (1946) - Bartender (uncredited)
- Without Reservations (1946) - U.S. Senator / Train Passenger (uncredited)
- Don't Gamble with Strangers (1946) - Ship Passenger (uncredited)
- Night and Day (1946) - Doorman (uncredited)
- Of Human Bondage (1946) - Turnkey (uncredited)
- It Shouldn't Happen to a Dog (1946) - Bar and Grill Customer (uncredited)
- Crack-Up (1946) - Man at Art Lecture (uncredited)
- Deception (1946) - Concertgoer (uncredited)
- The Verdict (1946) - Sergeant (uncredited)
- Undercurrent (1946) - Man in Photo (uncredited)
- Criminal Court (1946) - Roberts (uncredited)
- The Locket (1946) - Wyndhams' Chauffeur (uncredited)
- California (1947) - Delegate (uncredited)
- My Brother Talks to Horses (1947) - Passenger on Trolley (uncredited)
- Monsieur Verdoux (1947) - Police Detective (uncredited)
- Calcutta (1947) - Police Officer (uncredited)
- Moss Rose (1947) - Cab Driver (uncredited)
- The Secret Life of Walter Mitty (1947) - Train Passenger (uncredited)
- Unconquered (1947) - Jailer (uncredited)
- Green Dolphin Street (1947) - Guest (uncredited)
- The Exile (1947) - Ross
- Mourning Becomes Electra (1947) - Policeman (uncredited)
- The Paradine Case (1947) - Juror (uncredited)
- If Winter Comes (1947) - Moving Man (uncredited)
- A Woman's Vengeance (1948) - Warder (uncredited)
- Big City (1948) - Lawyer (uncredited)
- The Hunted (1948) - Restaurant Table Extra (uncredited)
- So This Is New York (1948) - Race Track Spectator (uncredited)
- Johnny Belinda (1948) - Man Reciting Lord's Prayer (uncredited)
- An Innocent Affair (1948) - Nightclub Patron (uncredited)
- Kiss the Blood Off My Hands (1948) - Thomas Widgers, Innkeeper (uncredited)
- Unfaithfully Yours (1948) - Concert Attendee (uncredited)
- That Wonderful Urge (1948) - Courtroom Spectator (uncredited)
- Command Decision (1948) - Elevator Passenger (uncredited)
- The Fighting O'Flynn (1949) - Officer (uncredited)
- Any Number Can Play (1949) - Casino Patron (uncredited)
- The Secret of St. Ives (1949) - Tribunal Judge (uncredited)
- Reign of Terror (1949) - Patriot (uncredited)
- Johnny Stool Pigeon (1949) - Porter (uncredited)
- White Heat (1949) - Prison Guard (uncredited)
- Challenge to Lassie (1949) - Bailiff (uncredited)
- That Forsyte Woman (1949) - Constable (uncredited)
- Montana (1950) - Townsman (uncredited)
- Francis (1950) - Officer at Plane Departure (uncredited)
- Chain Lightning (1950) - Pub Patron (uncredited)
- Please Believe Me (1950) - Man at Dock (uncredited)
- Outrage (1950) - Country Dance Attendee (uncredited)
- All About Eve (1950) - Sarah Siddons Awards Guest (uncredited)
- Hunt the Man Down (1950) - Bar Patron (uncredited)
- Gambling House (1950) - Man in Corridor (uncredited)
- The Company She Keeps (1951) - Racetrack Spectator in Stands (uncredited)
- Valentino (1951) - Servant (uncredited)
- I Can Get It for You Wholesale (1951) - Bar Patron (uncredited)
- My Forbidden Past (1951) - Party Guest (uncredited)
- I Was a Communist for the FBI (1951) - Communist at Meeting (uncredited)
- The Great Caruso (1951) - Operagoer (uncredited)
- Kind Lady (1951) - Pedestrian (uncredited)
- The Law and the Lady (1951) - Servant (uncredited)
- The Unknown Man (1951) - Courtroom Spectator (uncredited)
- Two Tickets to Broadway (1951) - Nightclub Patron (uncredited)
- My Favorite Spy (1951) - Club Patron (uncredited)
- Meet Danny Wilson (1952) - London Bobby (uncredited)
- Deadline – U.S.A. (1952) - Newspaperman (uncredited)
- Anything Can Happen (1952) - H. Westerly Bellin (uncredited)
- Red Planet Mars (1952) - Mine Owner (uncredited)
- The Quiet Man (1952) - Pub Extra (uncredited)
- Washington Story (1952) - Senator (uncredited)
- Dreamboat (1952) - Bailiff (uncredited)
- Because You're Mine (1952) - Gen. Montal's Aide (uncredited)
- Limelight (1952) - Music Hall Performer (uncredited)
- Something for the Birds (1952) - Senator (uncredited)
- Million Dollar Mermaid (1952) - Ship Passenger on Deck (uncredited)
- Stars and Stripes Forever (1952) - Man at Dancing Masters Convention Concert (uncredited)
- Angel Face (1953) - Courtroom Spectator (uncredited)
- Thunder in the East (1953) - Englishman (uncredited)
- Rogue's March (1953) - Officer at Dance (uncredited)
- Small Town Girl (1953) - Audience Spectator (uncredited)
- Ma and Pa Kettle on Vacation (1953) - Club Patron (uncredited)
- Sangaree (1953) - Pub Patron (uncredited)
- Gentlemen Prefer Blondes (1953) - Wedding Guest (uncredited)
- The Band Wagon (1953) - Drunk Outside Arcade (uncredited)
- So This Is Love (1953) - Man on Stage at Grace's Audition (uncredited)
- Here Come the Girls (1953) - Man in Audience (uncredited)
- I, the Jury (1953) - Fenton Milford (uncredited)
- Those Redheads from Seattle (1953) - Barfly (uncredited)
- Calamity Jane (1953) - Chicagoan (uncredited)
- Give a Girl a Break (1953) - Man Leaving Bar (uncredited)
- Man in the Attic (1953) - Theatre Patron (uncredited)
- Rhapsody (1954) - Audience Member (uncredited)
- Brigadoon (1954) - Townsman (uncredited)
- Désirée (1954) - General Becker (uncredited)
- There's No Business Like Show Business (1954) - Priest on Altar (uncredited)
- A Man Called Peter (1955) - Man at Youth Rally (uncredited)
- The Eternal Sea (1955) - Officer (uncredited)
- Moonfleet (1955) - Guest (uncredited)
- How to Be Very, Very Popular (1955) - Strip Bar Bartender (uncredited)
- It's Always Fair Weather (1955) - Father in Montage / Nightclub Extra (uncredited)
- The Girl Rush (1955) - Casino Patron (uncredited)
- The Girl in the Red Velvet Swing (1955) - Trial Spectator (uncredited)
- Sincerely Yours (1955) - Concert Attendee (uncredited)
- It's a Dog's Life (1955) - Butcher (uncredited)
- Glory (1956) - Derby Spectator (uncredited)
- Bigger Than Life (1956) - Churchgoer (uncredited)
- The First Traveling Saleslady (1956) - Passerby on Sidewalk (uncredited)
- Beyond a Reasonable Doubt (1956) - Juror (uncredited)
- Death of a Scoundrel (1956) - Stock Purchaser (uncredited)
- D-Day the Sixth of June (1956) - Bar Patron (uncredited)
- Top Secret Affair (1957) - Spectator at Senate Hearing (uncredited)
- Gunfight at the O.K. Corral (1957) - Barfly (uncredited)
- Sweet Smell of Success (1957) - Patron at 21 (uncredited)
- The Seventh Sin (1957) - Party Guest (uncredited)
- Les Girls (1957) - Gendarme Outside Courtroom (uncredited)
- The Unholy Wife (1957) - Rodeo Party Guest (uncredited)
- Witness for the Prosecution (1957) - Jury Foreman (uncredited)
- The Last Hurrah (1958) - Man - Plymouth Club Member (uncredited)
- Tarawa Beachhead (1958) - Man in Bar (uncredited)
- Auntie Mame (1958) - Perry (uncredited)
- Compulsion (1959) - Courtroom Spectator (uncredited)
- North by Northwest (1959) - Man at Auction (uncredited)
- The Story on Page One (1959) - Courtroom Spectator (uncredited)
- Heller in Pink Tights (1960) - Bonanza Audience Member (uncredited)
- Inherit the Wind (1960) - Courtroom Spectator (uncredited)
- Elmer Gantry (1960) - Extra at Revival Meeting (uncredited)
- Sunrise at Campobello (1960) - Convention Delegate (uncredited)
- Midnight Lace (1960) - Pub Patron (uncredited)
- Cimarron (1960) - Townsman at Schoolhouse (uncredited)
- A Fever in the Blood (1961) - Gubernatorial Delegate (uncredited)
- The Absent Minded Professor (1961) - Man in Crowd (uncredited)
- Ada (1961) - Club Patron (uncredited)
- Judgment at Nuremberg (1961) - Courtroom Spectator (uncredited)
- Incident in an Alley (1962) - Juror (uncredited)
- Mr. Hobbs Takes a Vacation (1962) - Bartender (uncredited)
- The Music Man (1962) - Brighton Townsman (uncredited)
- Hemingway's Adventures of a Young Man (1962) - Chef (uncredited)
- The Manchurian Candidate (1962) - Senator (uncredited)
- To Kill a Mockingbird (1962) - Courtroom Spectator (uncredited)
- Twilight of Honor (1963) - Courtroom Spectator (uncredited)
- The Prize (1963) - Guest at Awards Ceremony (uncredited)
- The Best Man (1964) - Man at Pool (uncredited)
- Good Neighbor Sam (1964) - Nurdlinger Servant (uncredited)
- My Fair Lady (1964) - Ad Lib at Church (uncredited)
- Where Love Has Gone (1964) - Mrs. Hayden's Servant (uncredited)
- Shenandoah (1965) - Church Member (uncredited)
- The Cincinnati Kid (1965) - Spectator at Cockfight (uncredited)
- The Oscar (1966) - Academy Awards Guest (uncredited)
- Munster, Go Home! (1966) - Man in Pub (uncredited)
- Hotel (1967) - Hotel Patron (uncredited)
