= Colonel Humphrey Flack (radio series) =

American radio comedy series (1947)

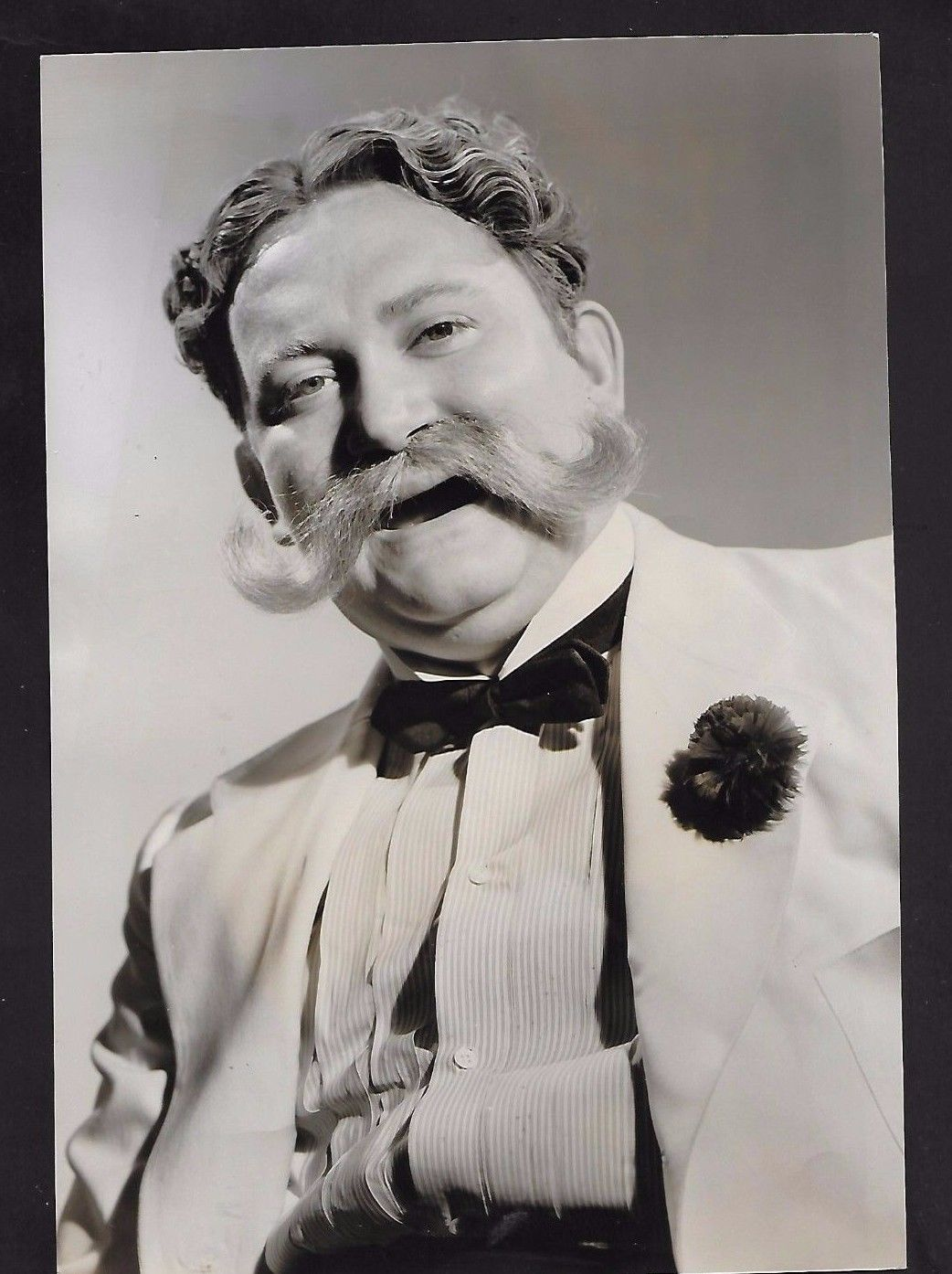
Wendell Holmes as Colonel Flack

Colonel Humphrey Flack is an American comedy radio program that was broadcast on NBC beginning on July 2, 1947.

== Overview ==
Wendell Holmes portrayed retired Colonel Humphrey Flack, and Frank Maxwell played his companion, Uthas P. "Patsy" Garvey, two men who outwitted confidence men to help people in need. The Flack character, "a modern Robin Hood with a high-handed way with money", originated in magazine stories by Everett Rhodes Castle in The Saturday Evening Post. Episodes typically had Flack encountering an innocent person who had been cheated, which prompted Flack to take charge and foil the criminal, "usually by engineering an even larger swindle". Dick Dudley was the announcer.

== Production ==
Episodes were 30 minutes long. The program was a summer replacement for The Aldrich Family on Thursdays at 6 p.m. Central Time. The writers were Tom Dougall and Sheldon Stark.

== Critical response ==
John Crosby wrote in a syndicated review that the program lacked variety in its stories: "Flack always encounters swindlers; Flack always wins." He also wrote that one of the schemes depicted in the show was so transparent that it "wouldn't have fooled an idiot orphan, much less a widow, no matter how lame-brained".

A review of the premiere episode in the trade publication Variety said that Colonel Humphrey Flack was "quite a relief from the whodunits flooding the warm summer air". The review complimented Holmes's acting and the writing and pace of the show.

== Adaptation ==
A television version of the series, also titled Colonel Humphrey Flack, was broadcast on the Dumont Television Network in 1953-1954 and later syndicated. It starred Alan Mowbray in the title role with Frank Jenks as Garvey.
