= The Egg (film) =

1922 film

- Directed by: Gilbert Pratt
- Produced by: Broncho Billy Anderson
- Starring: Stan Laurel
- Release date: September 4, 1922
- Running time: 22 minutes
- Country: United States
- Language: Silent with English intertitles

The Egg is a 1922 American silent comedy film directed by Gilbert Pratt, produced by Broncho Billy Anderson featuring and starring Stan Laurel.

== Cast ==
- Stan Laurel as Humpty Dumpty
- Drin Moro as The president's daughter
- Colin Kenny as Gerald Stone
- Tom Kennedy as The Boss
- Alfred Hollingsworth as Mr. Stillwell, the president
