= Sic 'Em, Towser =

1918 film

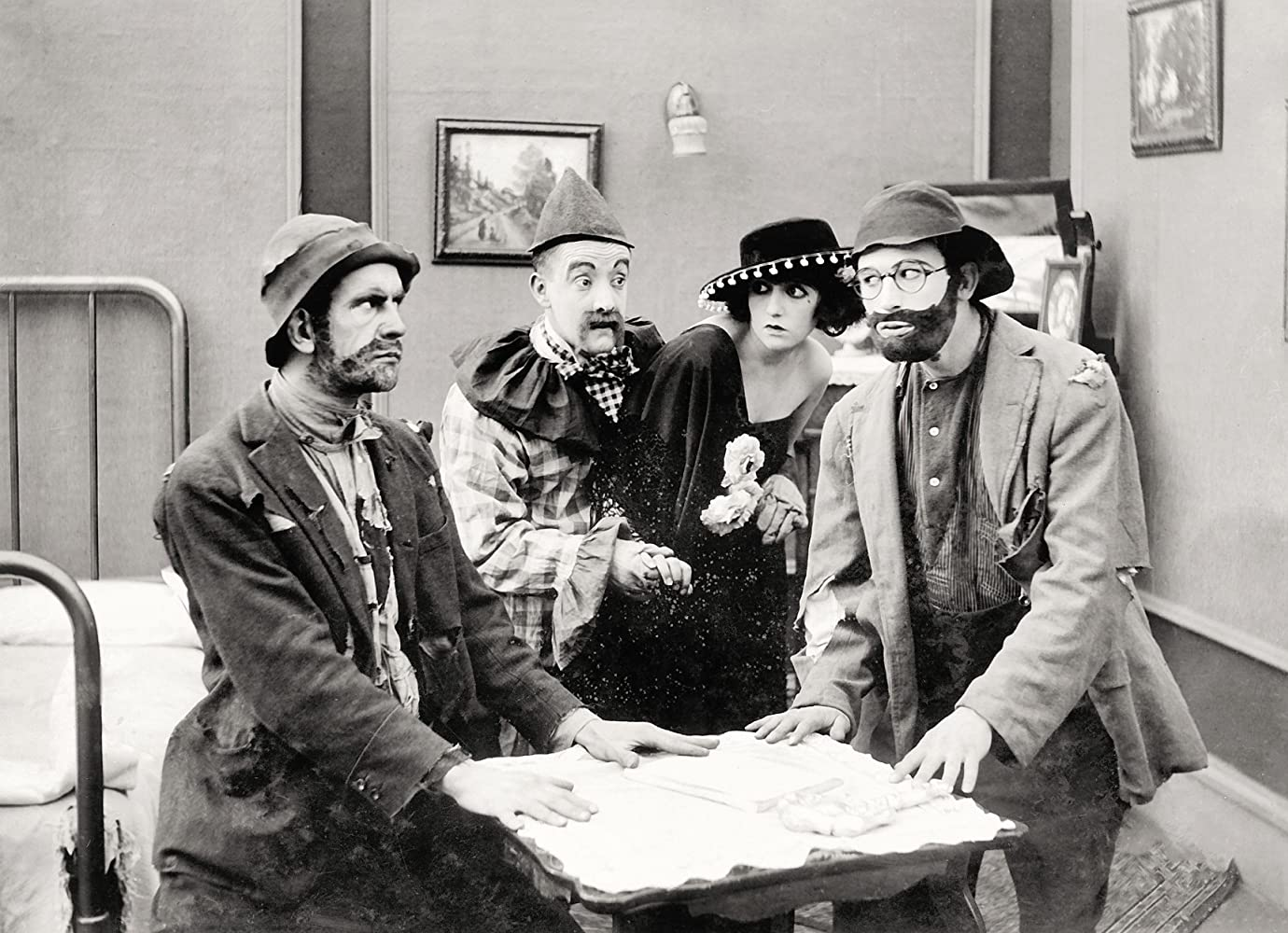
- (L to R) James Parrott, Snub Pollard, Bebe Daniels, and Harold Lloyd, in Sic 'Em, Towser.
- Directed by: Gilbert Pratt
- Produced by: Hal Roach
- Starring: Harold Lloyd
- Release date: June 9, 1918
- Country: United States
- Language: Silent with English intertitles

Sic 'Em, Towser is a 1918 short comedy film featuring Harold Lloyd. It is believed to be lost.

== Cast ==
- Harold Lloyd
- Snub Pollard
- Bebe Daniels
- William Blaisdell
- Sammy Brooks
- Lige Conley (credited as Lige Cromley)
- William Gillespie
- Helen Gilmore
- Gus Leonard
- James Parrott
- Charles Stevenson (credited as Charles E. Stevenson)
- Dorothea Wolbert

== See also ==
- Harold Lloyd filmography
