= Dog handlers =

Dog handlers can refer to:

- Professional handlers — a person who trains, conditions and shows dogs in professional shows for a fee
- Military or Police handlers — handlers of police dogs
