= Colonel Humphrey Flack =

American television sitcom

- Stars Frank Jenks and Alan Mowbray
- Also known as: The Fabulous Fraud; The Adventures of Colonel Flack; The Imposter
- Directed by: John Rich; Seymour Robbie
- Starring: Alan Mowbray; Frank Jenks
- Country of origin: United States
- No. of episodes: 39 (original DuMont run); 39 (Desilu remakes) ) 78 (total)

Production
- Running time: 30 minutes
- Production company: Desilu (revived series)

Original release
- Network: DuMont
- Release: October 7, 1953 – 1959

Colonel Humphrey Flack is an American sitcom that ran from October 7, 1953, to July 2, 1954, on the DuMont Television Network, then revived from 1958 to 1959 for first-run syndication.

The series also aired under the titles The Fabulous Fraud, The Adventures of Colonel Flack, and The Imposter.

== Overview ==
Preceded by a radio series of the same name, the series is about a con man who defrauded rich people, then gave some of the money to the needy. Colonel Humphrey Flack starred British actor Alan Mowbray as the Colonel, and Frank Jenks as his sidekick, Uthas P. ("Patsy") Garvey. The TV series was based on a popular series of short stories by Everett Rhodes Castle published in The Saturday Evening Post.

The pilot for the series aired on May 31, 1953, on an episode of the ABC Album/Plymouth Playhouse. Episodes of the program were initially broadcast on Wednesdays from 9 to 9:30 p.m. Eastern Time. In January 1954 the show was moved to Saturdays from 10 to 10:30 p.m. E. T. In May 1954 it was moved to Fridays from 10:30 to 11 p.m. E. T.

When the series was revived in 1958, it was retitled Colonel Flack. The 39 episodes (all remakes of the original 39 episodes) aired from October 5, 1958, to July 5, 1959, in syndication. The syndicated programs were made by Desilu Productions and featured Mowbray and Jenks in their original roles.

== Production ==
The producers were Ed Jurist, Jerry Layton, and Wilbur Stark. The directors were John Rich and Lester Vail. The writers were Jurist and Paul West. The announcer was Bob Sheppard. The DuMont episodes were performed live with no studio audience. Episodes on DuMont were sponsored by Clorets and Dentyne.

== Critical response ==
A review in TV Guide noted that the program succeeded as a situation comedy "without benefit of any husband-and-wife team, precocious children, etc." It also complimented Mowbray's and Jenks's portrayals of their characters.

Steven H. Scheuer, in a "TV Kenotes" column, described Mowbray's portrayal of Flack as "engaging" and said that his performance created "solid competition" for other TV shows.

Jack Gould wrote in The New York Times that the program "is divertingly out of the ordinary" in the way it "pokes mild fun at the whole business of running down crooks". He commended the performances of Mowbray and Jenks and the casting that combined their talents.

A review in the trade publication Broadcasting called the show "a relaxing change" from the "gun battles, valiant private eyes, blond bombshells, murder, intrigue, and suspense" typical of many TV show of its time. The review complimented Mowbray's and Jenks's performances.

== Episode status ==
At least 12 episodes of the DuMont series are in the collection of the UCLA Film and Television Archive and two episodes are at the Paley Center for Media.

== See also ==
- 1953-54 United States network television schedule
- List of programs broadcast by the DuMont Television Network
- List of surviving DuMont Television Network broadcasts

== General bibliography ==
- Weinstein, David. The Forgotten Network: DuMont and the Birth of American Television (Philadelphia: Temple University Press, 2004) ISBN 1-59213-245-6
