= Deadman's Island (San Pedro) =

Dredged island in Los Angeles harbor

Coordinates: 33.723630°N 118.265904°W

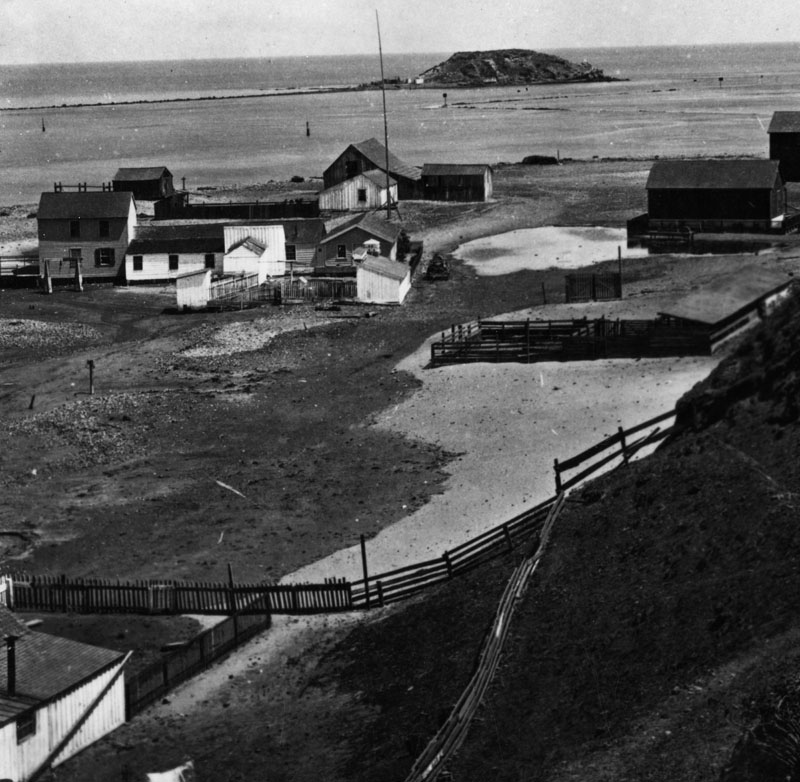
Deadman's Island at the top of an 1873 photo of San Pedro

Deadman's Island was one of two islands near San Pedro, Los Angeles, California in the 19th century. The land, sometimes referenced as Dead Man's Island, Isla Del Muerto, and Reservation Point, was dredged away in 1928 as part of a harbor development effort. Rattlesnake Island, the other islet in the area, became Terminal Island.

== History ==
French sea captain Auguste Bernard Duhaut-Cilly visited the small islet on April 10, 1827. On its highest point, he found the eyrie of a "sea eagle’s with two eaglets", described as "black with the under part of the tail and the top of the head a yellowish white". From this description these were probably bald eagles (Haliaeetus leucocephalus).

In 1835, Richard Henry Dana Jr. recorded in his personal narrative Two Years Before the Mast how he witnessed the brutal flogging of a shipmate by their captain in San Pedro Harbor. In his melancholy, he described Dead Man's Island as a "small, desolate-looking island, steep and conical...of a clayey soil on which had been buried an Englishman, the commander of a small merchant brig", who was rumored to have been poisoned by his crew. Dana wrote, "Had it been a common burying-place it would have been nothing. The single body correlated well with the solitary character of everything around. It was the only thing in California from which I could extract anything like poetry. Then, too the man had died far from home, without a friend near him..."

On October 8, 1846, in a battle between U.S. soldiers and local Californios called the Battle of the Old Woman's Gun, as many as six American soldiers were killed. They were subsequently buried on Isla del Muertos, or as it was more commonly known, Deadman's Island.

A whaling station once existed on Deadman's Island. The Los Angeles Star (Jan. 12, 1861) reported: "A whaling party from San Diego has located on Dead Man's Island at San Pedro, and has succeeded in capturing two whales from which forty-five barrels of oil were extracted". In March 1861 a right whale was caught, as well as five other whales during a two-week period—estimated to be worth $300 each (Los Angeles Star, March 9, 1861). In 1862 twenty-five whales (probably gray) were caught — another source said this referred to the catch in 1861-62 (12 in 1861; 13 in 1862). In March 1862 alone six were caught in six days. A Captain Hart was in charge of the whaling station from 1860 to about 1862. Captain Henry Johnson, a whaler at San Diego, was a financial backer in the Deadman's Island operation. According to A. H. Clark (1887, p. 54): "In 1866 a station existed for a short time on Dead Man’s Island, a circular rock rising in San Pedro Bay." This second operation only lasted one season, 1865 to 1866, and was under the command of Captain Jack Smith.

In the latter part of the 19th century, Deadman's Island became a talking point in the free port wars during which moneyed interests debated the merits of locating a deepwater port at either San Pedro or Santa Monica Bay. Senator William P. Frye of the Senate Committee on Commerce lampooned the islet in arguing against San Pedro. "Deadman's Island! Rattlesnake Island! I should think it would scare a mariner to death to come into such a place!

The comedy short Lonesome Luke's Wild Women (1917) starring Harold Lloyd was filmed on location on Deadman's Island.

Beginning in 1928 dynamite, dredgers, and bulldozers took the island off the map to accommodate the expanded port. In the process up to two dozen skeletons were uncovered. The islet had been used as a convenient burying place for several centuries. In addition to the sailors and marines of the 1846 battle, the deceased included Black Hawk, one of the natives forcibly removed from San Nicolas Island in 1835, two Spanish soldiers who may have lived in the 17th century, a blonde woman, and a man with an arrowhead through his head.
