= Mary Jane's Pa (play) =

1906 play by Edith Ellis

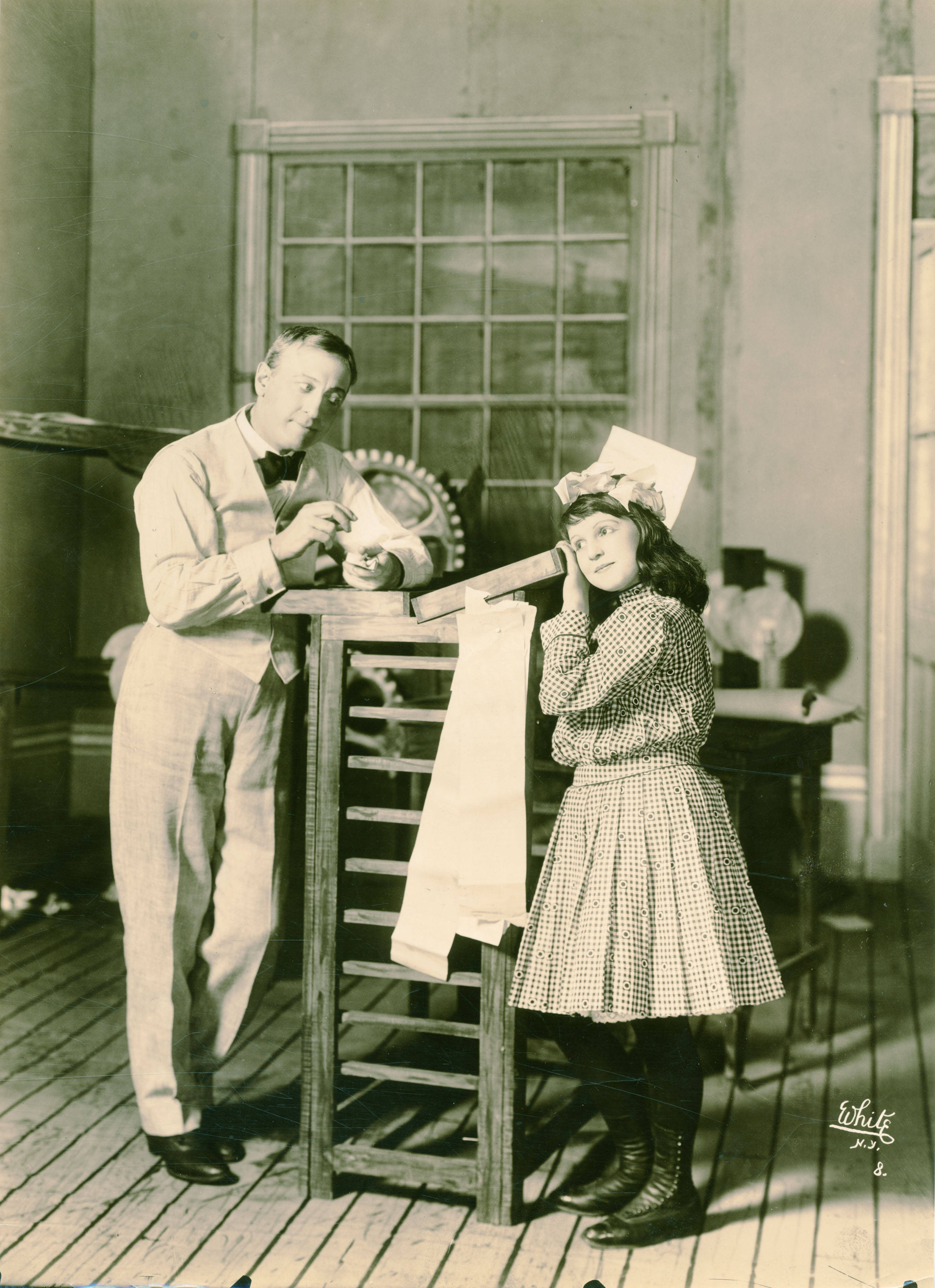
- Henry E. Dixey and Gretchen Hartman
- Original language: English
- Written by: Edith Ellis
- Subject: Small town romance and strife
- Genre: Comedy drama
- Setting: Perkins' home, and a print shop in Gosport, Indiana.

Premiere
- Date: December 3, 1908
- Place: Garden Theatre
- Directed by: Edith Ellis and Madison Corey

Mary Jane's Pa is a 1906 American play by Edith Ellis. It is a comedy drama in three acts, with three settings, and fifteen principal characters. The story concerns a small town printer with wanderlust, who drops in on his wife and daughters after eleven years absence. The action of the play takes place on three separate days, spanning several weeks in September.

The play was first produced by Henry W. Savage, staged by Edith Ellis and Madison Corey, and starred Henry E. Dixey. It had tryouts at Albany, New York and other locations starting in November 1908, before premiering on Broadway during December 1908.

Mary Jane's Pa was novelized in 1909, and served as the basis for a 1917 silent film and a 1935 movie.

== Characters ==
Characters are listed in order of appearance within their scope.

Lead

- Lucille Perkins is 16, a seriously smart student, with her father's wanderlust but not his sang-froid.
- Portia Perkins is 36, mother of two girls, abandoned by Hiram; she has built two businesses (Note: Both the Perkins Print Shop and the weekly Clarion newspaper are owned by Portia, but the big printing press is mortgaged by the local bank, for which Joel Skinner is a director.) and bought a house on her own.
- Mary Jane Perkins, called Girlie, is 12, sweet, strong, and caring, much like her mother Portia.
- Hiram Perkins is a cultured printer, Portia's errant husband, who has wandered around the globe for 11 years.

Supporting

- Ivy Wilcox is 18, a thoughtless small town belle, prisoner of her own vanity, next door neighbor to the Perkins.
- Barrett Sheridan is 23, a wealthy former journalist, now a traveling actor; he is in love with Lucille.
- Joel Skinner is 59, a small town boss, mendacious and a bully; he is running for state representative. (Note: He uses the expression "Great Caesar's ghost!" when thwarted or frustrated by Portia.)
- Rome Preston is 40 and single, an honest attorney running for state representative; a good friend of Portia.
- Eugene Merryfield, called Gene, is the typesetter for the print shop and the Clarion, toyed with by Ivy.

Featured

- Star Skinner is 20, son of Joel; indolent, obtuse, and mean-spirited, who likes Lucille and is pursued by Ivy.
- Claud Whitcomb is in his mid-thirties, a carter who sells firewood and tries to avoid paying for the Clarion.
- Miss Faxon is 55, a milliner and a moralizer, with an ancient indiscretion to live down. (Note: Thirty years earlier she had been seen at a restaurant eating oysters with a married man.)
- Linc Watkins drives the local horse drawn "bus"; short and stout, he wears a fur coat in the summer heat. (Note: A man left it with Linc, saying he could use it until he returned. Linc is determined to get the maximum use of it, even if the weather isn't suitable.)
- Lewellyn Green is 15, the boy of all work at the print shop. Loyal to Portia, and fond of Mary Jane.
- John Whipple is 50, Joel Skinner's smug political advisor and a grafter according to Portia.

Bit players

- Passenger on Linc's bus for the train station.
- Mr. Dobbs is an elderly notary, who certifies the Miller affidavit accusing Skinner of low dealings.
- Mrs. Wilcox is Ivy's mother, Portia's next door neighbor.
- Jim is a friend of Star Skinner, going to Ivy's party.

Walk-on

- A brass band; parade on-lookers; girls and boys going to Ivy's party; mob of citizens.

== Synopsis ==
The play takes place over the course of several weeks in September during the early 1900's, in Gosport, Indiana.

“I've gotten this home together by pinching, scrimping, and slaving. Do you think it's been fun? Do you thinks it's been play? Sometimes, let me tell you, its been hell... Well, while you watched the geisha girls dance, I washed and ironed and scrubbed. While you listened to the music of the temple bells, I ran a sewing machine until dawn. While you sipped tea with a mandarin, I stood by my press and worked with my hands covered with grease and ink. You went your way and I've gone mine.... This is my home and my children's.... Do you understand?” —Portia to Hiram, from Act I.

Act I (Interior of the Perkins home. Afternoon.) Lucille is studying when Ivy comes in the back door, her hair in rollers. She wants to borrow something, but hides when Barrett calls. He and Lucille discuss Portia's antipathy to their seeing each other. Star drops by, then Claud Whitcomb comes in, followed by Miss Faxon. Joel Skinner is next and Ivy's nerve finally breaks. She dashes from the house, hands covering her hair, shouting "Don't look!". The others are startled but Lucille shrugs and says "Ivy". Miss Faxon wants her ad in the Clarion changed, while Claud has a load of firewood for sale and some local news for the newspaper. Joel Skinner is cagy about his business with Portia. Linc arrives next, also with some tidbits for the Clarion. He takes Miss Faxon to the depot, while Portia quizzes Skinner. He wants her to stop the political attacks in the Clarion, accusing her of favoring his rival Rome Preston for personal reasons. Later, Mary Jane and Lucille voice their distress to Portia about rumors she is a "suffragist" and too friendly with Rome. Mary Jane also wonders why Portia has no photos of and never talks about her father. (Note: Without specifically saying so, Portia has allowed people in Gosport to assume she is a widow, since no one in this town knew Hiram Perkins. Lucille was only four and Mary Jane an infant when Hiram left, so neither remembers him.) As Portia sits alone, a knock is heard and in walks Hiram after eleven years. Portia is astounded. Hiram recounts his years wandering the world; he has little money and looks like a tramp. Portia excoriates Hiram for his abandonment, but allows him to stay on condition he does the cooking and housework and tells no one of his identity. Hiram agrees and picks the alias "Nabal". (Note: He explains it means "fool" (נבל) in Hebrew.) As he goes upstairs, Rome Preston calls out "good night" to Portia from the street. (Curtain)

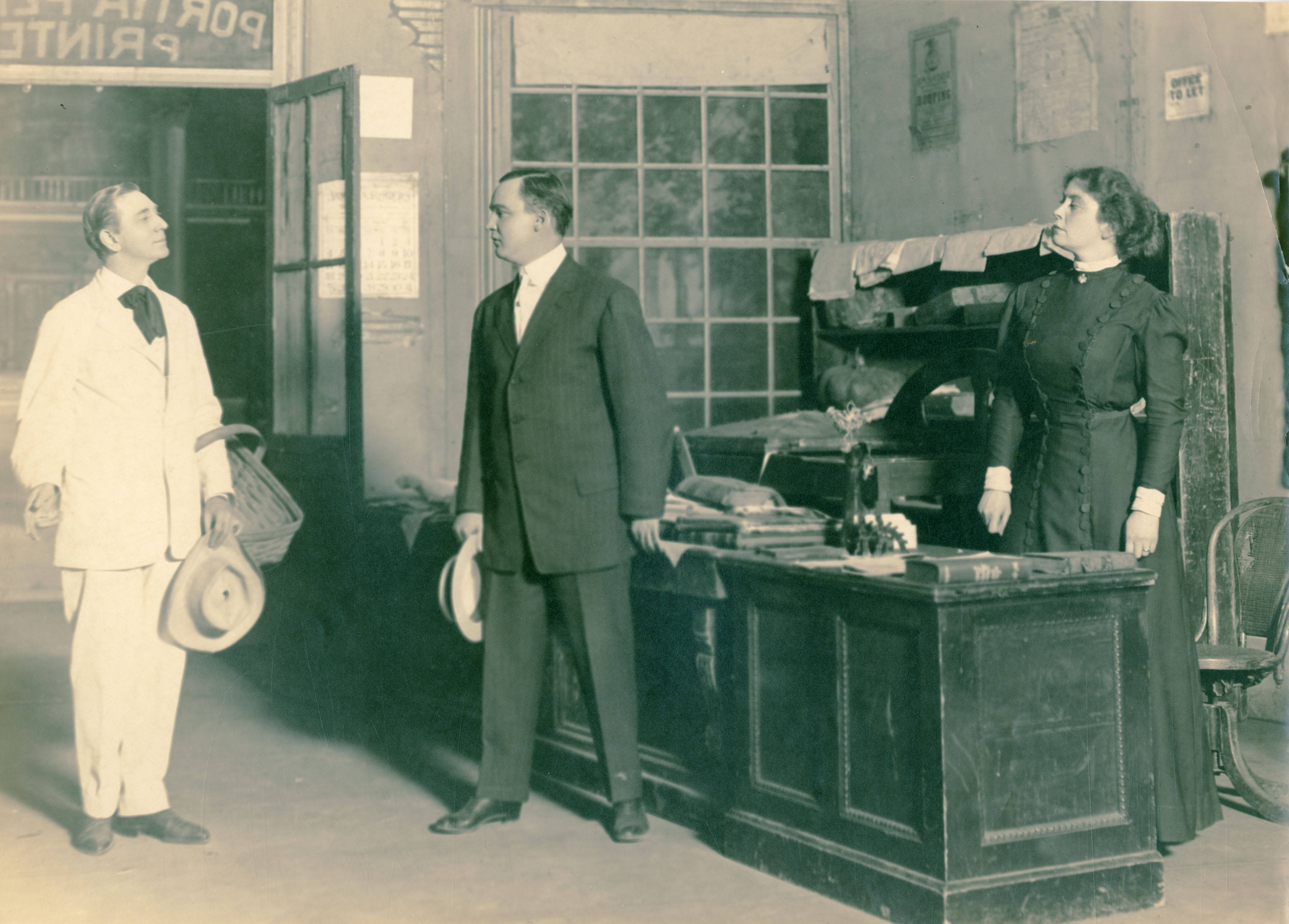

Act II (Perkins Print Shop and office of the Clarion. Friday morning, three weeks later.) Barrett Sheridan and his troupe have returned. He has hired a brass band to parade down Main Street. They can be seen through the windows and open doors of the print shop, where Gene Merryfield and Lewellyn are working. Ivy flirts with Gene until Star shows up. Star and Ivy go out when Nabal enters. He irritates Gene by pointing out a misspelt word in his type. Barrett asks about his show's advertising fliers, but is delighted to see Nabal, whom he knew as "Evans" when both worked at a big city paper. Nabal says he has written a book for Barrett's father, a wealthy publisher. Portia asks Lewellyn to fetch a buggy from the livery stable, so she can take Jenny Miller's affidavit at the factory. She spies Lucille and Barrett talking in front of the shop, oblivious to all. She sends Lucille away then argues with Barrett about his suitability for her daughter, not wanting Lucille to make the same mistake she did. At this, Nabal excuses himself. Preston tries to dissuade Portia from printing the Miller story, fearful Skinner will retaliate against her. Preston and Linc are surprised when Miss Faxon pulls her ad from the Clarion; she advises them not to associate with it, because of Nabal. Gene, also afraid for Portia, leaves so Preston can sabotage the Miller story by disabling the big press. Preston attempts to patronize Nabal, is defeated by his erudition, but asks him to leave town for Portia's sake. Mary Jane accepts a note from Sheridan at the shop front. She comes in and watches Nabal resetting the type for the Miller story. She admires how he learned so many things, and says how much she likes him. When Lucille returns she receives Barrett's note from Mary Jane. Portia returns; Lucille and her spar over the Skinner fight, and Barrett. Lucille and Mary Jane leave. Portia then begs help from Hiram to get the paper ready. They recondition a smaller press since Preston removed a piece from the larger one. Skinner and Whipple come in to bribe or browbeat Portia, but get the worst of it. Hiram prints the Clarion for the nominating convention that afternoon. (Curtain)

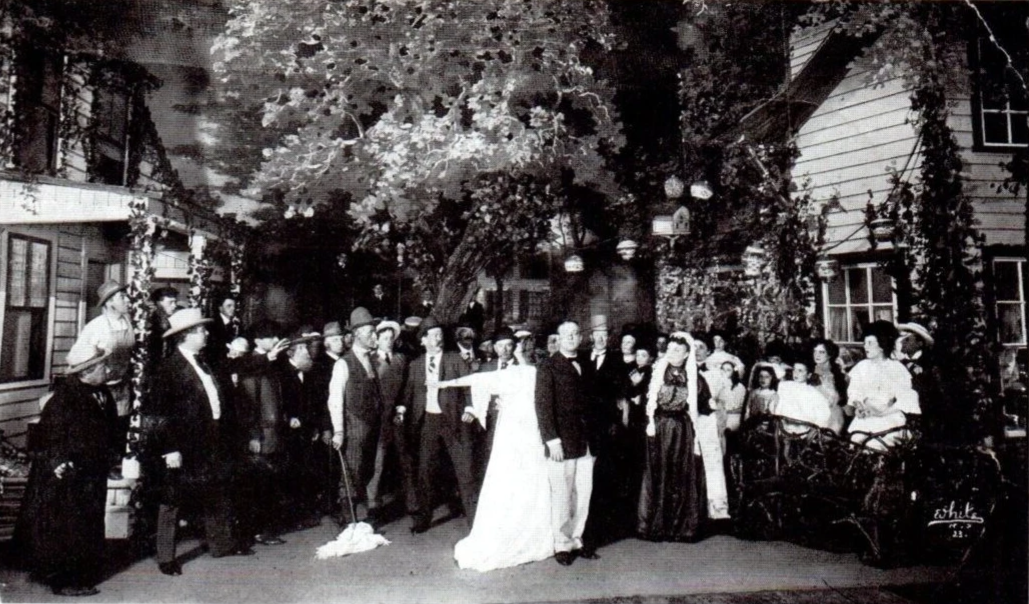

Act III (Perkins yard, with side and back porches. Evening of the next day.) Mary Jane and Portia are in the yard, when Ivy comes to borrow spoons and napkins for a party to which none of the Perkins are invited. Ivy explains she wanted to, but other folks said they wouldn't come otherwise. Nabal consoles Mary Jane by showing her a cake he baked. He also hands her an envelope with money he received from Barrett's father for completing his book. Lucille returns from school carrying her textbooks. She tells Portia she isn't going back because of the gossip, but doesn't mention her planned elopement. But Star has found the note from Barrett she dropped, and threatens to expose her as being like her mother. Lucille gives him a roundhouse slap that staggers him. He teeters into Ivy's house, mumbling threats. Rome accepts Portia's congratulations on winning the nomination, and confesses to sabotaging the big printer. Nabal stops Lucille from eloping; he insists Barrett take her for a walk then come back. Gene and Lewellyn run over to Portia: a mob led by Skinner and Miss Faxon are wrecking the print shop. Linc hurries over to warn the mob is headed this way. Skinner and Miss Faxon incite the mob to tar and feather Nabal. Rome, Linc, and the printers stand by Portia, who in turn protects Nabal. She shouts that Nabal is her husband of 17 years, Hiram Perkins. The crowd is dumbfounded and starts melting away; Skinner insults Portia and Hiram decks him. Portia and Rome have a bittersweet parting. Hiram, planning to depart, is told by Portia to stay. Hiram in turn reconciles her to Barrett as a son-in-law, as Lucille and him stroll back into view. (Curtain)

== Original production ==
=== Background ===
Edith Ellis began writing this play in 1905, finishing it a year later. She modelled the character of Mary Jane on her own daughter, and said Hiram Perkins was based on a relative, but not her own father. Rehearsals began in October 1908; after four weeks producer Henry W. Savage pronounced himself satisfied with the production, and went overseas. The play was staged for its tryouts by author Ellis and producing-manager Madison Corey.

=== Cast ===
Cast from the tryouts through the Broadway run.
Role	Actor	Dates	Notes and sources
Lucille Perkins	Anna Wynn	Nov 16, 1908 - Nov 21, 1908	
Lucille Perkins	Marjorie Wood	Nov 23, 1908 - Nov 21, 1908	
Portia Perkins	Marie Nordstrom	Nov 16, 1908 - Nov 21, 1908	
Portia Perkins	Ann Sutherland	Nov 23, 1908 - Feb 27, 1909	
Mary Jane Perkins	Gretchen Hartman	Nov 16, 1908 - Feb 27, 1909	Hartman, who drew much praise from critics, was the same age as her character.
Hiram Perkins	Henry E. Dixey	Nov 16, 1908 - Feb 27, 1909	
Ivy Wilcox	Maud Earle	Nov 16, 1908 - Feb 27, 1909	
Barrett Sheridan	Morgan Coman	Nov 16, 1908 - Feb 27, 1909	
Joel Skinner	Hardee Kirkland	Nov 16, 1908 - Feb 27, 1909	
Rome Preston	Emmett King	Nov 16, 1908 - Feb 27, 1909	
Eugene Merryfield	Frank Bixby	Nov 16, 1908 - Feb 27, 1909	
Star Skinner	John Junior	Nov 16, 1908 - Feb 27, 1909	
Claud Whitcomb	Horace Newman	Nov 16, 1908 - Feb 27, 1909	
Miss Faxon	Alice Gilmore	Nov 16, 1908 - Feb 27, 1909	
Linc Watkins	Edward Chapman	Nov 16, 1908 - Feb 27, 1909	
Lewellyn Green	Augustin Daly Wilkes	Nov 16, 1908 - Feb 27, 1909	
John Whipple	TBD	Nov 16, 1908 - Feb 27, 1909	This role was not mentioned in contemporaneous newspaper cast lists but is in the published play.

=== Tryouts ===
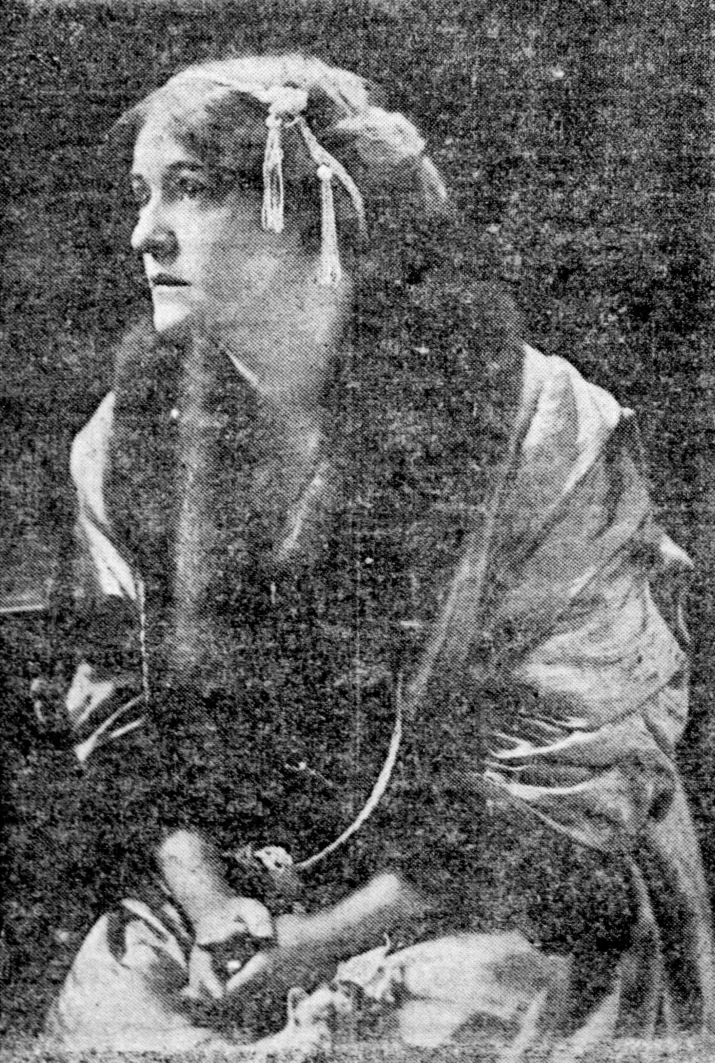
Annie Sutherland

The play's first tryout occurred at the Harmanus Bleecker Hall in Albany, New York on November 16, 1908. The production then played two nights at the Wieting Opera House in Syracuse, New York. The local reviewer complimented Henry E. Dixey, and Marie Nordstrom as Portia, thought the redemption of the shiftless husband was done "in admirable style and with clever skill and tact", and that the play would improve as it was "pulled together". The production was expected to open at the Garden Theatre on Monday, November 23, 1908, but when Henry W. Savage returned from overseas and caught a tryout performance at Schenectady, New York on Friday, November 20, 1908 he delayed the Broadway premiere until December.

Savage replaced Marie Nordstrom with Annie Sutherland as Portia, and Anna Wynn with Marjorie Wood as Lucille. Two male roles were also recast before the next tryout at the New Plainfield Theatre in Plainfield, New Jersey on December 1, 1908. The final tryout occurred at the Opera House in Paterson, New Jersey on December 2, 1908.

=== Broadway premiere and reception ===
Mary Jane's Pa had its Broadway premiere at the Garden Theatre on December 3, 1908. The reviewer for The Brooklyn Daily Eagle called it "a farce with melodramatic trimmings", and recalled when the author Edith Ellis Baker was resident in Brooklyn with the Baker Stock Company. They praised Dixey's performance, said he was well-supported by Ann Sutherland, Gretchen Hartman, and Marjorie Wood, and found no fault with the staging. The New-York Tribune critic said the play was "without form and devoid of sense". They labelled it a farce since Portia is working and Hiram is cooking and cleaning: "No arrangement of domestic affairs could easily be devised that would seem more preposterous, assumed as fact".

The New York Times reviewer thought Edith Ellis had come up with a quaint new idea, but her playwriting technique wasn't quite up to supporting it, though the play was "wholesome and amusing". They also thought Henry Dixey, though charming and competent, could have done more with the character of Hiram than just "read the lines". They praised the work of Sutherland, Wood, and Hartman, and that of Emmett King as Rome Preston. The critic for The Brooklyn Daily Times pointed out the technical unlikeliness of Hiram's print shop magic, but thought the play had enough "of the human in it to succeed". They mentioned Edith Ellis "gave a complicated speech" and had to dodge the rapidly descending second-act curtain. They felt Marjorie Wood had given "the best piece of character portrayal of her career".

The then mayor of Gosport, Indiana saw the play in January 1909, and registered two objections with the producer: that the town's name was misspelt as "Gossport" in the program, and "to the presence of a negro in the street scene in the second act". The program spelling was corrected, but no change was made to the casting.

=== Changes of venue ===
Henry Dixey had previously contracted with Abe Erlanger to bring his current production to the Grand Opera House in Brooklyn for a week. Mary Jane's Pa was still running well at the Garden Theatre, but Erlanger would not release Dixey from his legal commitment. So starting February 1, 1909, the Mary Jane's Pa production moved to the Grand. It then returned to the Garden Theatre on February 8, 1909, to finish out its Broadway run. (Note: In a bit of chicanery, Henry W. Savage had let out the Garden Theatre starting Friday, February 5, 1909 to Benjamin Chapin for his time-sensitive (i.e. for the upcoming Lincoln's Birthday holiday) performance in Lincoln at the White House. Chapin discovered that he could perform evenings only on that Friday and Saturday; when Mary Jane's Pa returned to the Garden Theater on Monday evening, February 8, 1909, he was limited to matinees. Chapin filed suit but could not obtain redress before his window of opportunity expired.)

=== Broadway closing ===
The production closed its Broadway run on February 27, 1909 at the Garden Theatre, and immediately went on tour starting March 1, 1909 at the Parsons Theatre in Hartford, Connecticut.

== Adaptations ==
=== Literary ===
- Mary Jane's Pa (1909) - A novelization of the play by Norman Way, published by H. K. Fly Company.

=== Film ===
- Mary Jane's Pa (1917) - Five reels; a reviewer for the New-York Tribune who saw it in the Vitagraph production room, said "It is not so good a picture as it was a play", citing "lack of dialogue" and action that dragged as reasons.
- Mary Jane's Pa (1935) - Made under the working title of Wanderlust, it reverted back to the original title before release.

== Bibliography ==
- Edith Ellis. Mary Jane's Pa: A Play in Three Acts. Mitchell Kennerley, 1914.
