= Mary Jane's Pa (1917 film) =

1917 silent film

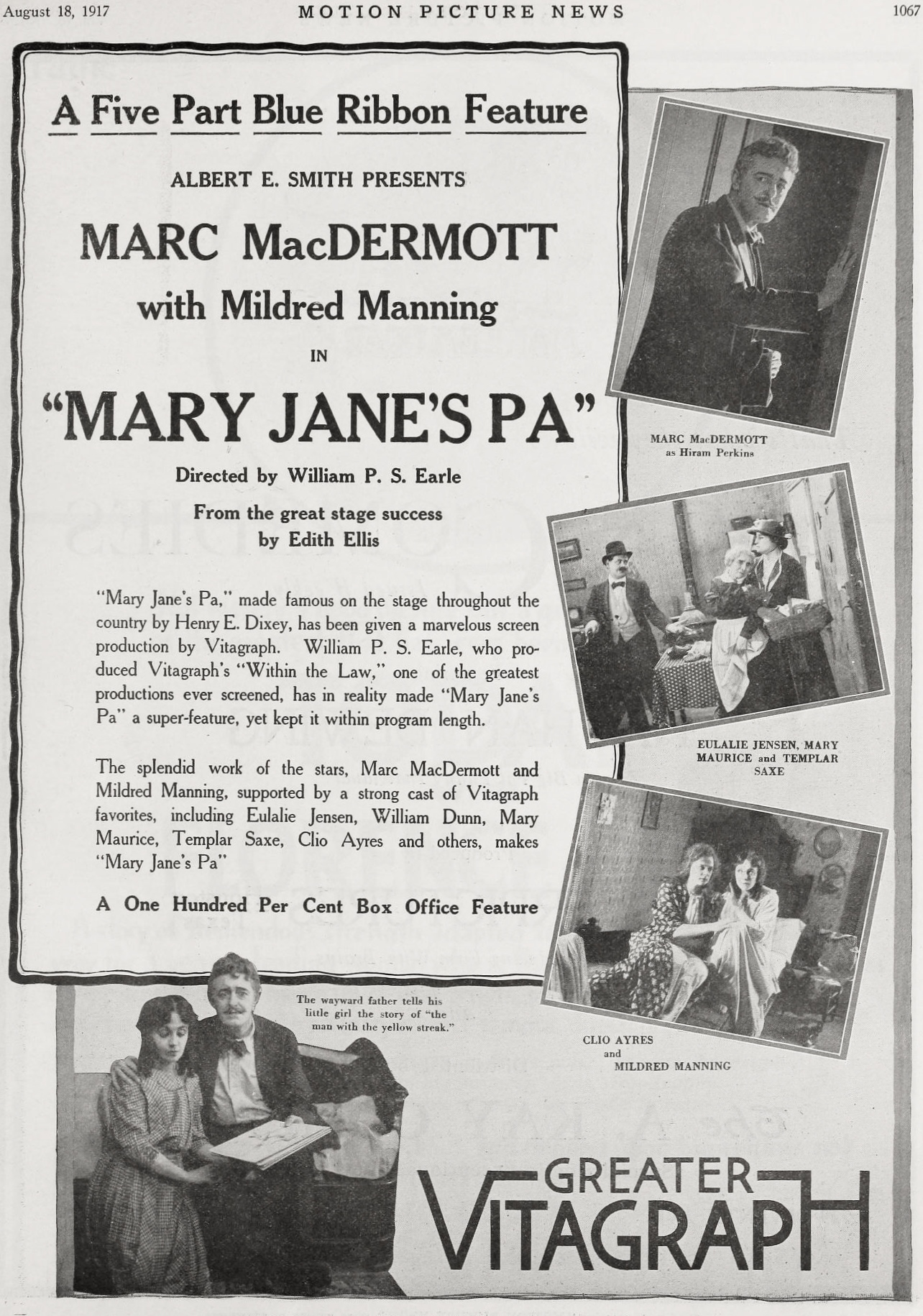
- Directed by: Charles Brabin; William P.S. Earle
- Written by: Edith Ellis (play); A. Van Buren Powell
- Based on: Mary Jane's Pa
- Starring: Marc McDermott; Mildred Manning; Eulalie Jensen
- Cinematography: John W. Brown
- Production company: Vitagraph Company of America
- Distributed by: Greater Vitagraph
- Release date: August 13, 1917
- Running time: 50 minutes
- Country: United States
- Languages: Silent; English intertitles

Mary Jane's Pa is a 1917 American silent drama film directed by Charles Brabin and William P.S. Earle and starring Marc McDermott, Mildred Manning and Eulalie Jensen.

It is based on the 1906 play Mary Jane's Pa by Edith Ellis, later adapted into a 1935 sound film of the same title.

== Cast ==
- Marc McDermott as Hiram Perkins
- Mildred Manning as Mary Jane
- Eulalie Jensen as Portia Perkins
- Emmett King as Rome Preston
- Clio Ayres as Lucille Perkins
- William R. Dunn as Barrett Sheridan
- Templar Saxe as Joel Skinner

== Bibliography ==
- Parish, James Robert & Pitts, Michael R. . Film Directors: A Guide to their American Films. Scarecrow Press, 1974.
