= The Idol of Bonanza Camp =

- Produced by: David Horsley
- Starring: Alexander Gaden; Harry Van Meter; Edna Maison
- Distributed by: Universal Film Manufacturing Company
- Release date: June 4, 1913
- Country: United States
- Languages: Silent film English intertitles

The Idol of Bonanza Camp is a 1913 American silent short comedy film starring Harry Van Meter, Alexander Gaden and Edna Maison.
