= New York Female Giants =

Early 20th century women's baseball team

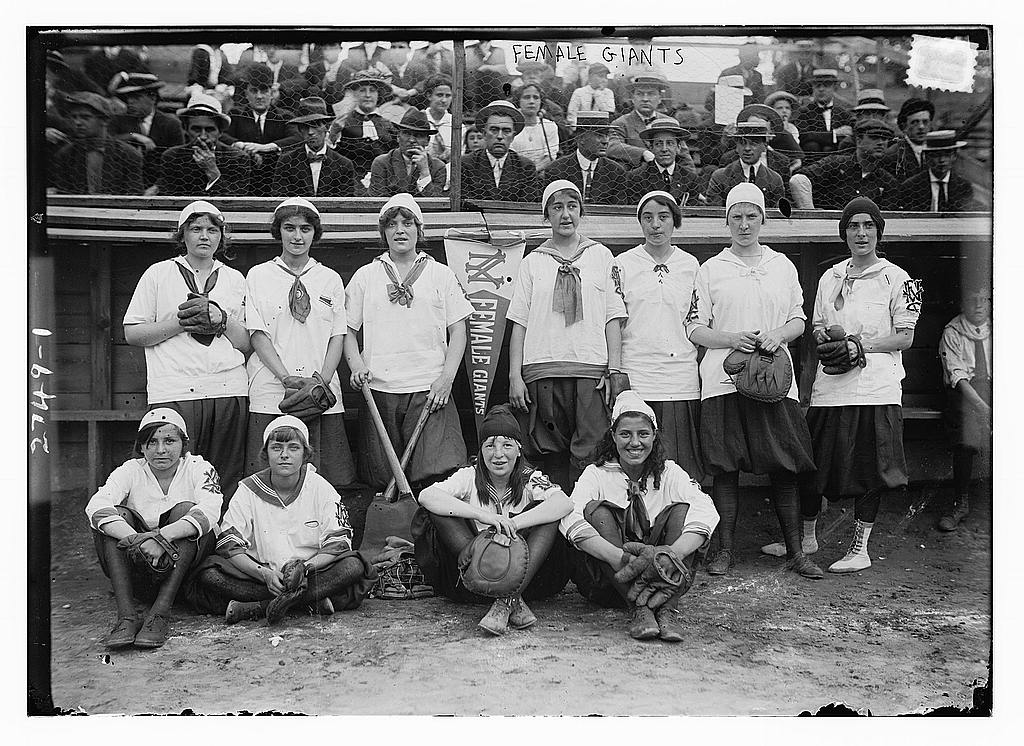
New York Female Giants, 1913

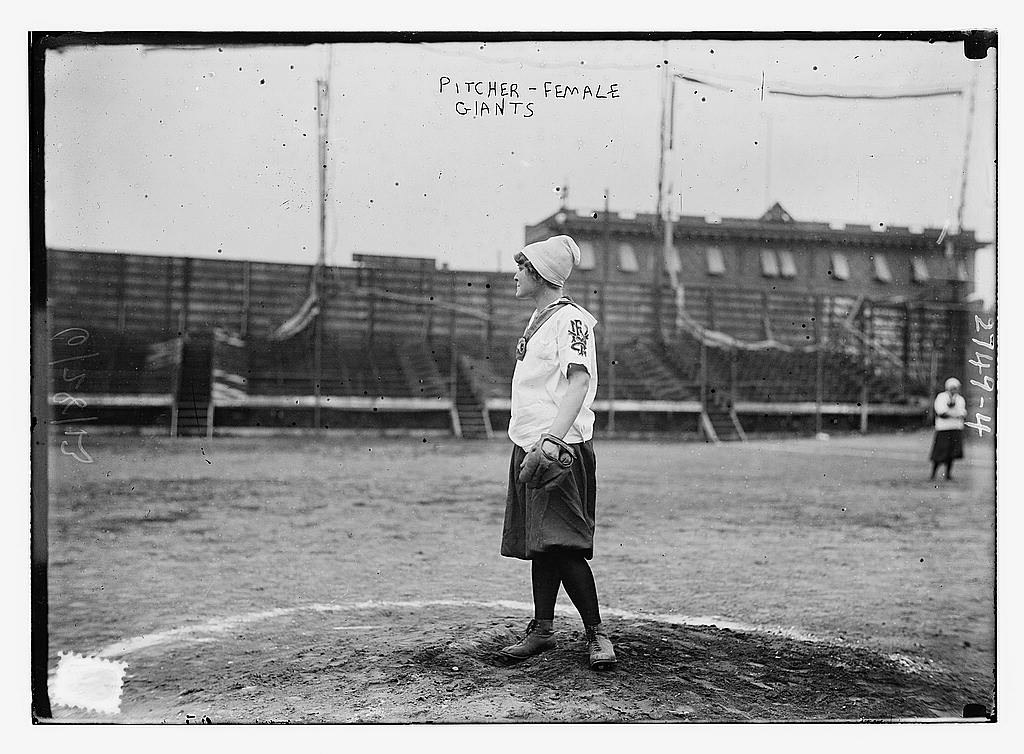
New York Female Giants pitcher in 1913

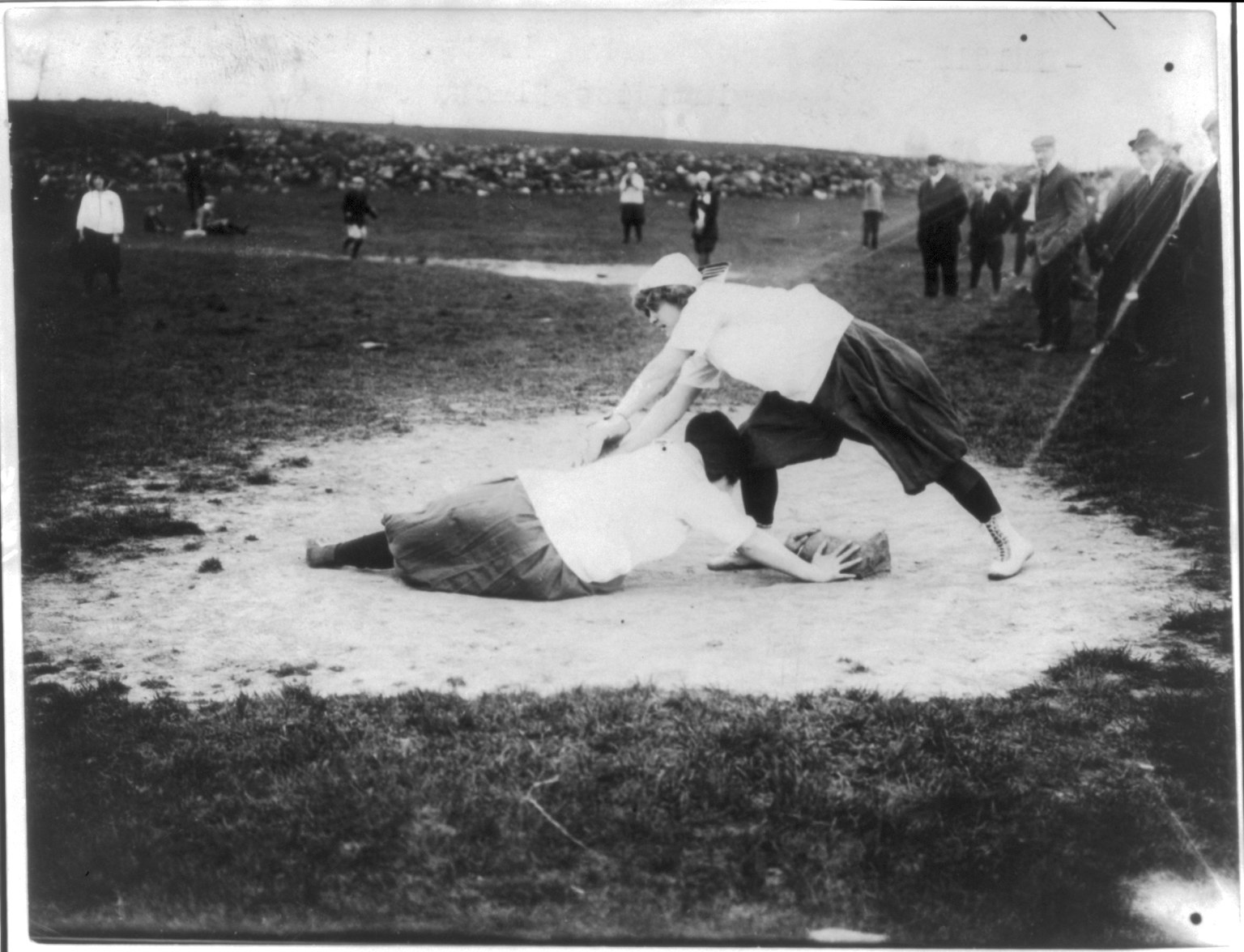
Miss Schnall, catcher, and Miss Slachu with hands on home plate in 1913

New York Female Giants was an all-woman baseball club in 1913.

The club consisted of 32 women, mostly high school students, who divided themselves into two teams (Reds and Blues) for intrasquad competitions. The team may have been created or supported by John McGraw, the manager of the New York Giants, the men's National League team.

The Female Giants generated mixed responses. The Rock Island Argus reported on the Giants as a "scheme" by "suffragets [sic]", though the New York Tribune reported that 1,500 spectators attended a Giants' game at the Lenox Oval in Manhattan. In the game at the Lenox Oval, team member Helen Zenker was arrested for violating the blue laws, by selling scorecards to the crowd between innings, despite the game taking place on a Sunday. The game was left unfinished as a result.

Ida Schnall was the captain of the team. She wrote an open letter to the New York Times hoping that the Giants would convince the Amateur Athletic Union, and its leader James Sullivan, to include women within the traditionally masculine sphere of sports. Women were banned from AAU-sponsored events during the Giants' 1913 season; they were admitted to some swimming events in 1914, after Sullivan's death. Women were finally admitted to most AAU sports in 1923, ten years after the heyday of the Giants.

== Team ==
- Ida Schnall team captain, pitcher
- Miss May McCullum, catcher
- Miss Ryan
- Miss Helen Zenker third baseman
