= The Proof of the Man =

1913 film

- Produced by: David Horsley
- Starring: Alexander Gaden; Edna Maison
- Distributed by: Universal Film Manufacturing Company
- Release date: July 7, 1913
- Country: United States
- Languages: Silent film English intertitles

The Proof of the Man is a 1913 American silent short drama film starring Alexander Gaden, Harry von Meter and Edna Maison.

== Cast ==
- Alexander Gaden as Dick the Chosen Suitor
- Edna Maison as Alma Field, Dick's Wife
- Harry von Meter as Norman, a Lost Prospector
- George A. Holt as Bill, the Rejected Suitor
