= Ida Schnall =

American sportwoman & actress

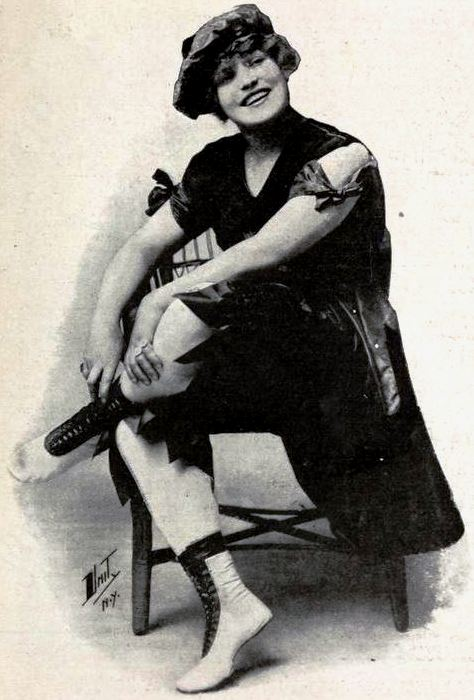
- Born: August 27, 1889
- Died: February 14, 1973 (aged 83); Los Angeles, California, U.S.
- Occupation: Actress

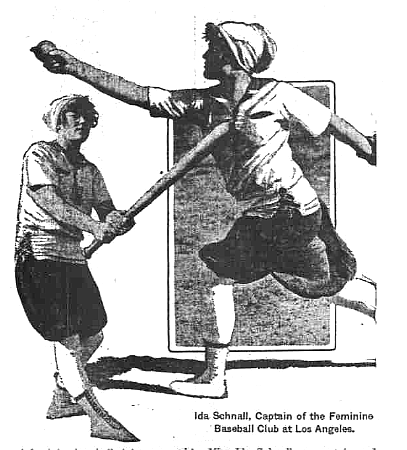

Ida Schnall (27 August 1889 – 14 February 1973) was the captain of the New York Female Giants baseball team, an advocate for women's sports, and later a Hollywood actress.

== Early years ==
Born in Austria, Ida was raised in the Bronx, New York, the daughter of Priva (Pauline) and Burnett (Bernard) Schnall; her father was a cloak manufacturer. She was the only girl in a family where she had seven brothers, and she shared their interest in sports. At a time when girls generally did not participate in athletic events, Ida founded a female baseball team, the "Lady Giants", who competed locally, including against some male teams. She was a loyal baseball fan, who often attended major league games; she even asked the players for pointers on how to play better, and some, like Christy Mathewson obliged. In her teens, Ida began competing and winning track and field events. She became known locally for the many sports in which she participated. For example, in addition to playing baseball, and being a long distance runner, she enjoyed bowling, and she was also a competitive swimmer and diver. She participated in swimming races, and she liked to give exhibitions of "fancy diving". As a result of her many athletic pursuits, reporters who covered Ida described her as "an all 'round athlete of great ability". Ida also made some changes in how female athletes dressed: she wore bloomers when playing baseball, and when she participated in ice skating, she wore a so-called "harem skirt", baggy long pants that were much more comfortable and practical than the long skirts women were expected to wear. And she encouraged other young women to become knowledgeable about sports, whether they could play or not. She believed that a knowledge of sports was essential for a successful relationship: she advised young women to "cut out the beauty culture"—to stop worrying about how they looked or whether their makeup was perfect—and be willing to spend time outdoors, attending a baseball game, going sailing, or taking a swim. She said this would make a woman more interesting to the man she was dating.

== 1912 Olympics controversy ==
As a champion diver, Ida wanted to compete in the 1912 Summer Olympics, which had been opened to female divers and swimmers for the first time; but while 27 swimmers and 12 divers competed, none of them were American, because American women discovered that they were barred from participating. The man who ruled that the American women, including Ida Schnall, would not be allowed to compete was James Edward Sullivan of the United States Olympic Committee. Like many men of his time, he believed that allowing women to compete in the Olympics was unfeminine, and that women should not be permitted to be part of this kind of competition. Ida was not pleased, and she wrote to William Jay Gaynor, then mayor of New York, saying in part that many American women were "anxious to meet their sisters on the athletic field, If all the nations in Europe have fallen in line and allowed their women to compete in these games, why does not our land allow us to do likewise?" Ida felt the mayor sent her a dismissive and patronizing reply, but she was undaunted, telling reporters she would continue to fight for women to be allowed greater participation in athletics. But it would not be until 1920 when American women would finally be allowed to compete in the Olympics.

== Film and performing career ==
In 1912, Ida participated in the Broadway revue, "The Passing Show of 1912", and toured several cities performing with numerous entertainers. By 1915, she had relocated to the west coast. At the Panama–Pacific International Exposition, held in San Francisco, she won a beauty content in which she was named the "most beautifully formed woman in the United States". Later in 1915, she was residing in Hollywood, where she was preparing to take a role in an upcoming feature for Universal Studios. One of the first things she did upon moving there was to start a female baseball team; all the members were female actresses that she had met. She was soon cast in the starring role in the 1916 silent film Undine, where she played a water nymph. The movie was filmed in the Santa Barbara Islands, off the coast of California, Because many of the scenes involved Schnall's character wearing bathing suits, some critics objected to how much bare skin the film displayed, and censors cut out "over 500 feet of film" in order to make it acceptable to the movie audience. The film received critical acclaim; Schnall was not only praised for her "beauty and grace", but for her skill in performing some "daring dives". And as she had done before, she once again encouraged women to increase their participation in athletics. "Swimming is the best exercise for woman that I know...Not only will it do more to develop the figure than anything else, but it makes for grace and health."

== Personal life and later years ==
In January 1913, Ida married Adolph William Schnitzer, an insurance salesman; like Ida, he too had been born in Austria and emigrated to the United States as a child. The couple had two sons. Although legally Mrs. Ida Schnitzer, she continued to use the name Ida Schnall professionally. At some point circa the late 1930s, her husband anglicized his last name to something that sounded more typically American, a common custom at a time when antisemitism and anti-immigrant sentiments were on the rise. Thus, her husband became Will Carver, the name under which he was buried, after he died in August 1962. Ida became Ida S. Carver.

Throughout her marriage, she prided herself on her ability to be both a capable wife and mother and a capable performer. In interviews, she talked about her techniques for managing the housework, raising the kids, darning her husband's socks and cooking his favorite meals, while still finding time to go to the gym and exercise. In addition to her busy home life, Ida somehow found time to perform. She liked to combine exercise with entertainment, and one of her most popular performances was diving off the wing of an airplane into the ocean, a stunt she debuted at Coney Island in June 1921, under the auspices of the New York Daily News. She would later successfully perform a similar stunt in several other cities during the 1920s.

For several decades, she and her husband alternated between living in California and living in New York. While living in New York and raising her sons, she also made time to teach athletics and physical education to young women at the Flatbush Jewish Communal Center. And she liked to come up with new and newsworthy ways to exercise: in the late 1920s, for example, she demonstrated how to play tennis on ice skates.

During the 1930s and 1940s, when living on the west coast, Ida never lost her interest in athletics. By now, she was focusing her energies on playing tennis, one of the many sports she had played in her younger years. Even in the 1950s, when she was in her early 60s, reporters who watched her play noted that she was in excellent physical condition and determined to be a top amateur player. (Always a trailblazer, she had scandalized the tennis world in 1920 by wearing shorts, rather than a skirt, on the tennis court.)

Ida Schnall Carver died on February 14, 1973, in Los Angeles, California. Her obituary noted that she was considered "America's first all around woman athlete". It also noted that during years of competition, she "won 152 medals".

== Filmography ==
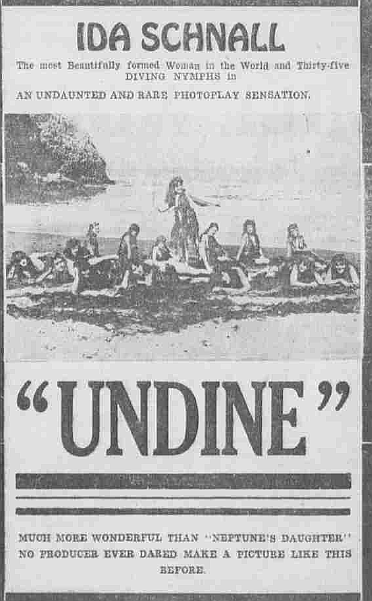
Newspaper ad for Undine

- Runaway June (1915)
- Undine (1916)
