= Edna Maison =

American actress

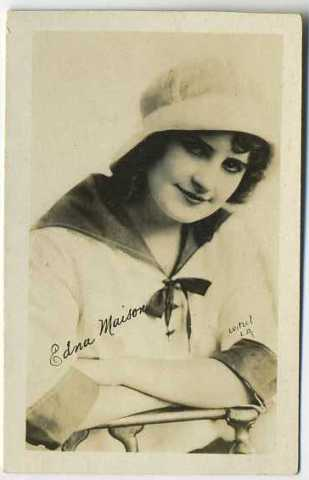
- Maison, 1910s
- Born: 17 August 1892; San Francisco, California, U.S.
- Died: 11 January 1946 (aged 53); Hollywood, California, U.S.
- Occupation: Actress
- Years active: 1912–1926

Edna Maison (born Carmen Edna Maisonneuve or Carmen Edna Maisonave; August 17, 1892 – January 11, 1946) was an American silent film actress.

Maison was born Carmen Edna Maisonave in San Francisco. Her father was a Frenchman and her mother was American. She was educated in Los Angeles at the Immaculate Heart Academy and her first job involved working with the Cooper Stock Company at the Burbank Theater in Los Angeles at the age of 6. Edna Maison's career started in Opera, singing at the Tivoli opera-house in San Francisco at age 15. Following, she went to Fisher's Theater, the California Opera Company, and lastly with the Edgar Temple Opera Company before moving into film work. Maison was described as an earth mother type who loved animals.

Maison starred in a total of 85 films between 1912 and 1926 in films such as The Idol of Bonanza Camp (1913) and Undine (1916) and appearing with actors such as Harry von Meter.

Maison died on January 11, 1946, aged 52, after having been ill for four years.

== Partial filmography ==
- The Idol of Bonanza Camp (1913)
- The Proof of the Man (1913)
- The Spy (1914)
- The Merchant of Venice (1914)
- Richelieu (1914)
- Under the Crescent (1915)
- Undine (1916)
- The Dumb Girl of Portici (1916)
- A Rich Man's Darling (1918)
- The Mysterious Mr. Browning (1918)
