= White Oak (film) =

1921 film

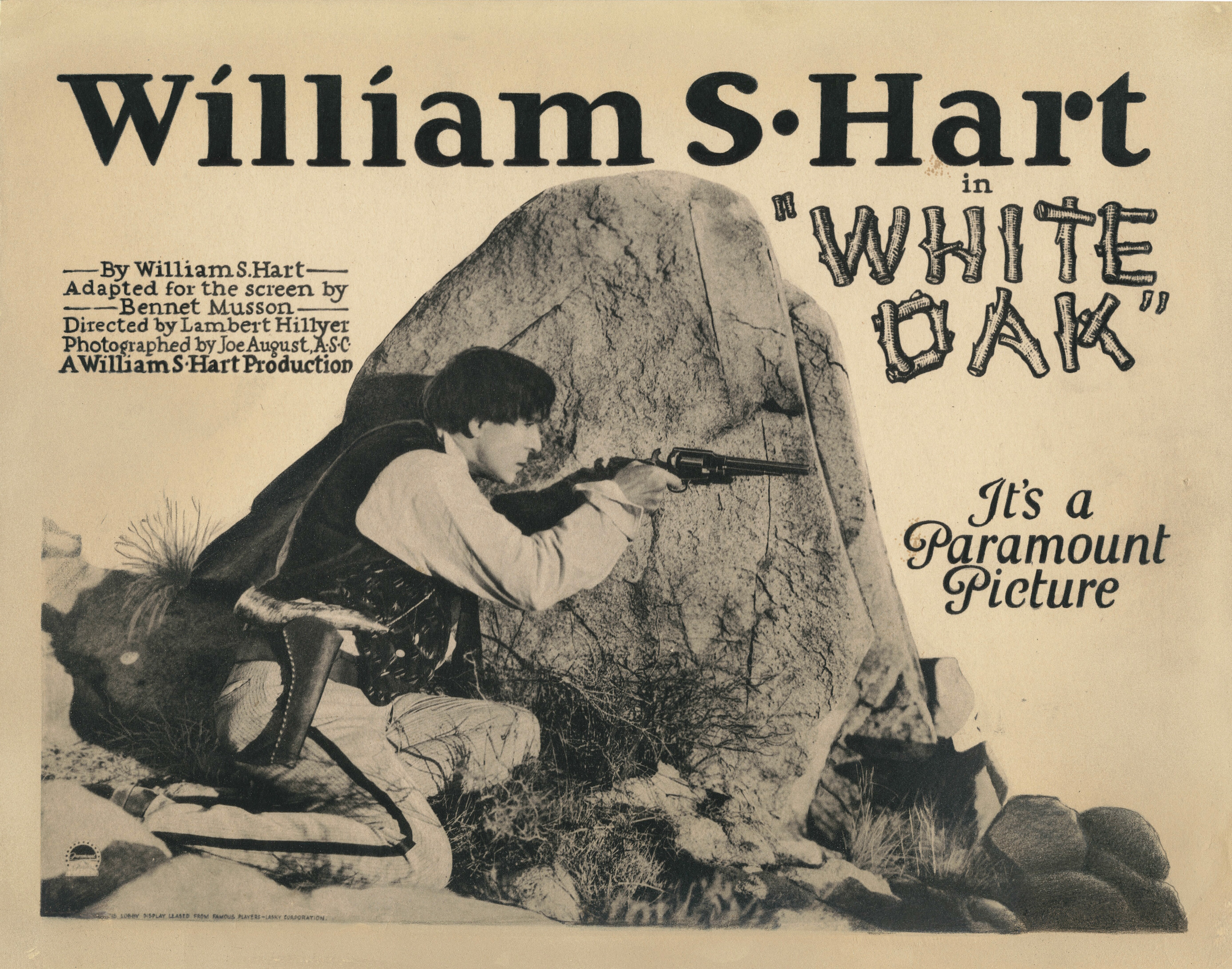
- Lobby card
- Directed by: Lambert Hillyer
- Screenplay by: William S. Hart; Bennet Musson
- Produced by: William S. Hart
- Starring: William S. Hart; Vola Vale; Alexander Gaden; Robert D. Walker; Bert Sprotte; Helen Holly; Luther Standing Bear
- Cinematography: Joseph H. August
- Edited by: William O'Shea
- Production company: William S. Hart Productions
- Distributed by: Paramount Pictures
- Release date: December 18, 1921
- Running time: 64 minutes
- Country: United States
- Languages: Silent; English intertitles

White Oak is a 1921 American silent Western film directed by Lambert Hillyer and written by William S. Hart and Bennet Musson. The film stars William S. Hart, Vola Vale, Alexander Gaden, Robert D. Walker, Bert Sprotte, Helen Holly, and Luther Standing Bear. The film was released on December 18, 1921, by Paramount Pictures. A copy of the film is in the Library of Congress, Museum of Modern Art, and William S. Hart Museum film archives.

== Cast ==
- William S. Hart as Oak Miller
- Vola Vale as Barbara
- Alexander Gaden as Mark Granger
- Robert D. Walker as Barbara's brother
- Bert Sprotte as Eliphalet Moss
- Helen Holly as Rose Miller
- Luther Standing Bear as Chief Long Knife
