= Gretchen Hartman =

American actress (1897-1979)

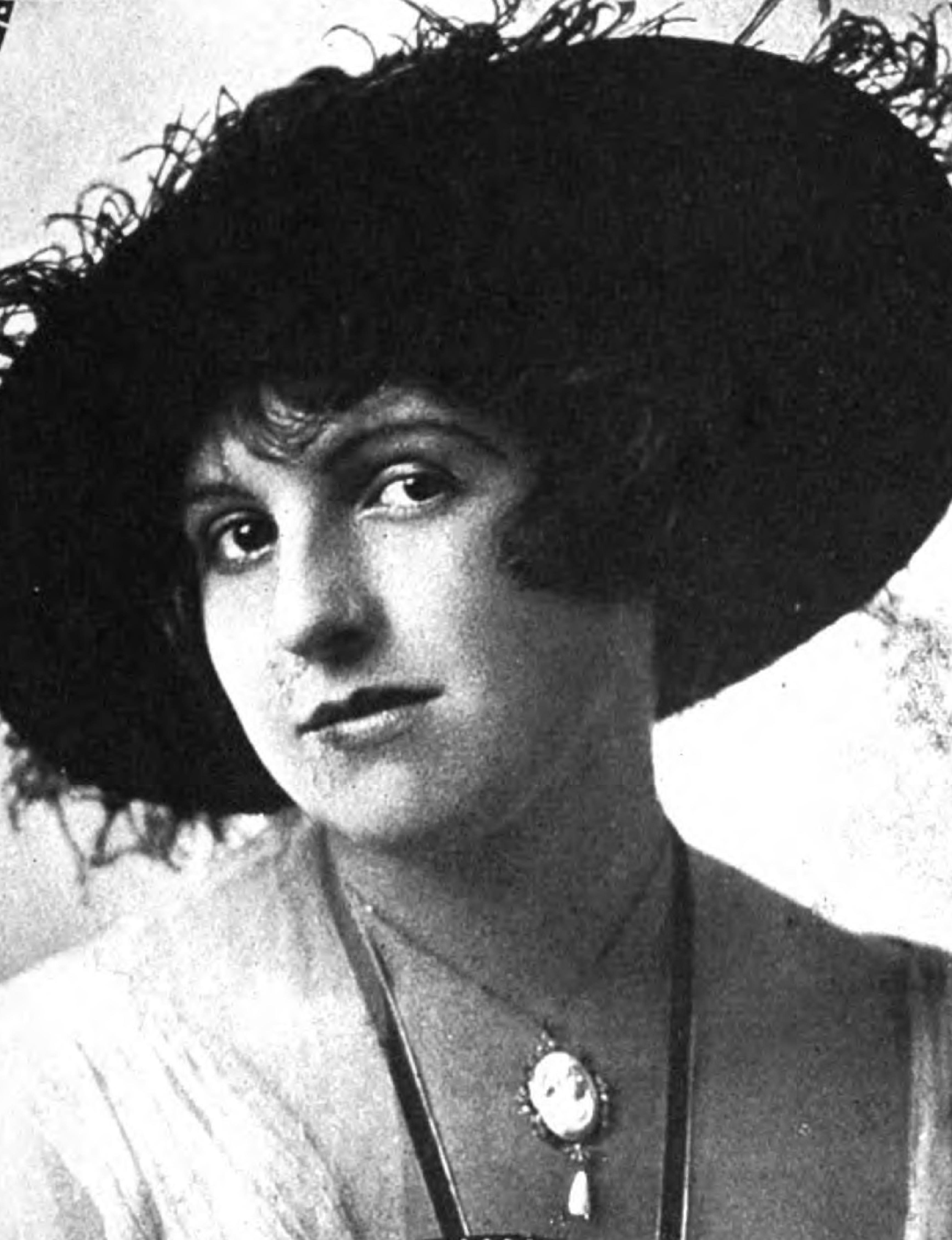
- Hartman in 1915
- Born: Grace Barrett; August 28, 1897; Chicago, Illinois, U.S.
- Died: January 27, 1979 (aged 81); Hollywood, California, U.S.
- Other names: Greta Arbin; Sonia Markova; Greta Hartman
- Occupation: Actress
- Years active: 1906–1952
- Spouse: Alan Hale Sr. (m. 1914; died 1950)
- Children: 3, including Alan Hale Jr.

Gretchen Hartman (born Grace Barrett; August 28, 1897 – January 27, 1979) was an American stage and film actress. She is credited on 67 movies, nearly all silent.

== Early life ==
Hartman was born Grace Barrett in Chicago, the daughter of actress Agnes A. Hartman.

== Career ==
Hartman debuted on stage at the Bush Temple Theatre in Chicago portraying Little Eva in Uncle Tom's Cabin. Her New York debut was in the same play, presented at the Majestic Theatre. She starred in Broadway plays as a child, starting her career at age nine. She started working in the theater under the name Greta Arbin before making her film debut. Her major roles were in: The Law and the Man (1906-1907), Uncle Tom's Cabin (1907), Mary Jane's Pa (1908–1909), and Sweethearts (1913–1914). She created the role of Mary Jane in Mary Jane's Pa.

Hartman started her film career with roles in short films beginning in 1911, when she starred as Rosalie in the film For the Flag of France. A popular figure in the silent film era, her best known films are Colomba (1915), from the novel by Prosper Mérimée, The Purple Lady (1916), with her husband, Victor Hugo's Les Miserábles (1917), The Bandbox (1919), Bride 13 (1920 serial), His Brothers Keeper (1921), and While Justice Waits (1922).

In 1915, she made a version of the popular novel East Lynne by Mrs. Henry Wood. In 1917–18, Hartman acted in three films for Fox studios under the name Sonia Markova, returning to the name Gretchen Hartman soon after. Besides Sonia Markova, she also used the stage name Greta Hartman.

== Marriage and death ==
Hartman married actor Alan Hale Sr., and they had three children, one of which is actor Alan Hale Jr. Hartman died on January 27, 1979, at the age of 81, and is buried in Forest Lawn Memorial Park in Glendale, California, next to her husband.

== Filmography ==
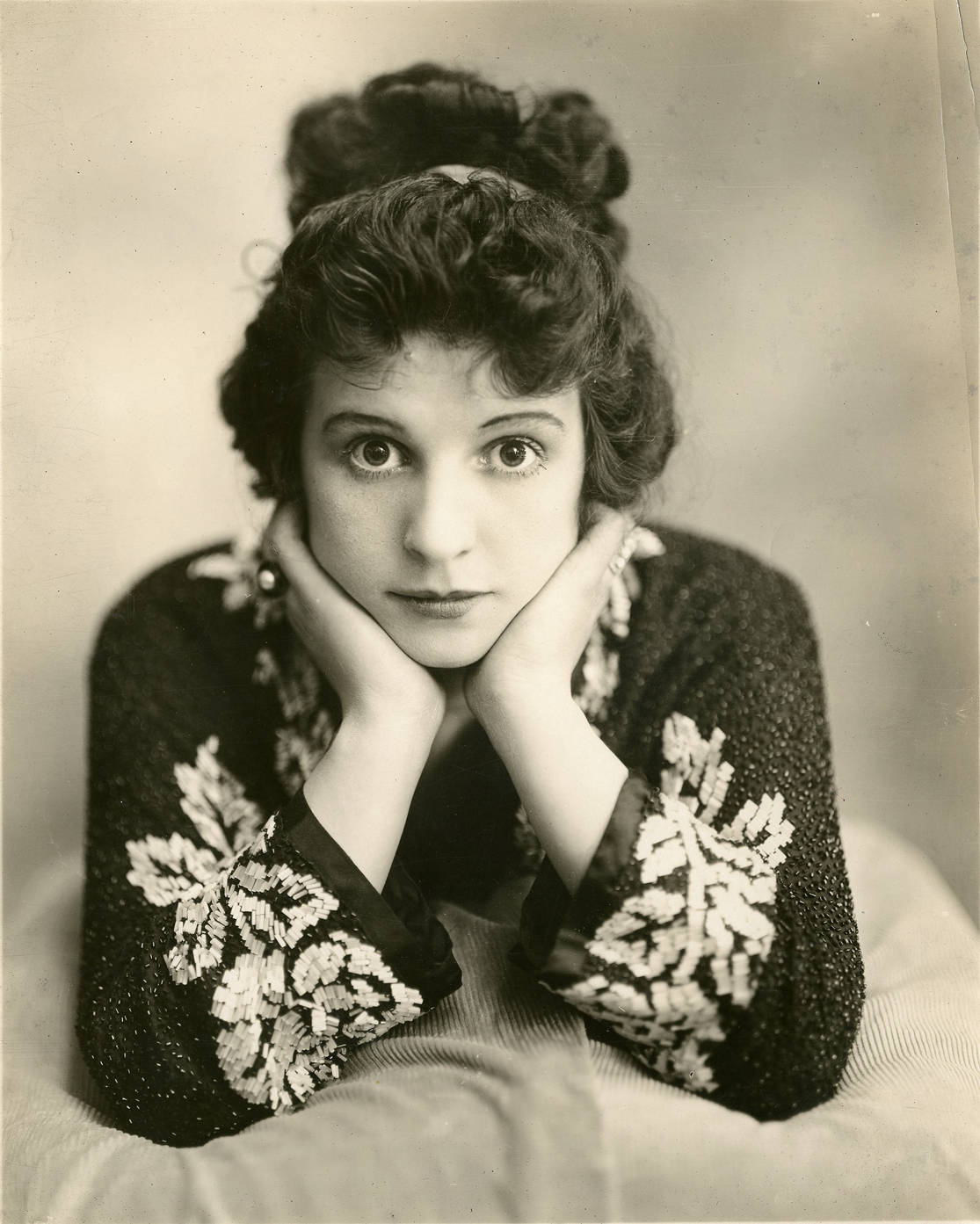
Publicity still of Hartman while she was billed as Sonia Markova

- For the Flag of France (1911)
- The Lost Freight Car (1911)
- The American Insurrecto (1911)
- The Cricket on the Hearth (i) (1914)
- Merely Mother (1914)
- The Spirit of Jealousy (1914)
- The First Law (i) (1914)
- A Woman's Folly (1914)
- Masks and Faces (1914)
- The Romance of a Poor Young Man (1914)
- In Quest of a Story (1914)
- His Prior Claim (1914)
- On the Heights (1914)
- The Third Act (1915)
- File No. 113 (1915)
- The Woman Who Paid (1915)
- Colomba (1915)
- His Brother's Keeper (i) (1915)
- The Girl and the Matinee Idol (1915)
- To Have and to Lose (1915) (unconfirmed)
- Adam Bede (1915)
- The Confession (ii) (1915)
- The Wives of Men (1915)
- The Smuggler's Ward (1915)
- A Daughter of Earth (1915)
- Reapers of the Whirlwind (1915)
- Jane Eyre (1915)
- East Lynne (1915)
- Dora (1915)
- The Soul of Pierre (1915)
- The Country Parson (1915)
- Winning the Widow (1915)
- Harvest (1915)
- Between Father and Son (1915)
- Her Stepchildren (1915)
- The Tides of Retribution (1915)
- The Iron Will (1916)
- His White Lie (1916)
- Pique (1916)
- The Guilt of Stephen Eldridge (1916)
- The Mystery of Orcival (1916)
- Alias Jimmy Barton (1916)
- Madelaine Morel (1916)
- The Man Who Called After Dark (1916)
- The Larrimore Case (1916)
- Fit for Burning (1916)
- The Purple Lady (1916)
- The Beast (1916)
- Rolling Stones (1916)
- The Love Thief (1916)
- Married in Name Only (1917)
- The Painted Madonna (1917, as Sonia Markova)
- Les Misérables (1917, as Sonia Markova)
- 1918 A Heart's Revenge (1918, as Sonia Markova)
- The House Without Children (1919)
- Atonement (1919)
- The Bandbox (1919)
- Bride 13 (1920)
- The Little 'Fraid Lady (1920)
- His Brother's Keeper (1921)
- Do and Dare (1922)
- While Justice Waits (1922)
- Elsie in New York (1926)
- She Goes to War (1929, talkie)
- The Time, the Place and the Girl (1929, talkie)
- The College Coquette (1929, talkie)
- Room for One More (1952, uncredited bit part)
