= Ellis Baker =

American actress (1896–1984)

- Born: October 26, 1898; Muskegon, Michigan
- Died: June 22, 1984 (aged 85); San Diego, California
- Occupation: Stage actress
- Spouse: Fredric March (married 1924-1927)
- Parent: Edith Ellis

Ellis Baker (b.1898 - 1984) was an American theatre actress.

She appeared on Broadway in Brook (1923), The Arabian (1927), These Few Ashes (1928) and Lady Windermere's Fan (1932).

Baker was married to the stage and film actor Fredric March from 1924 until 1927. She was also the daughter of playwright Edith Ellis, whose plays were popular in the United States and London during the early part of the 20th century.
