= A Rich Man's Darling =

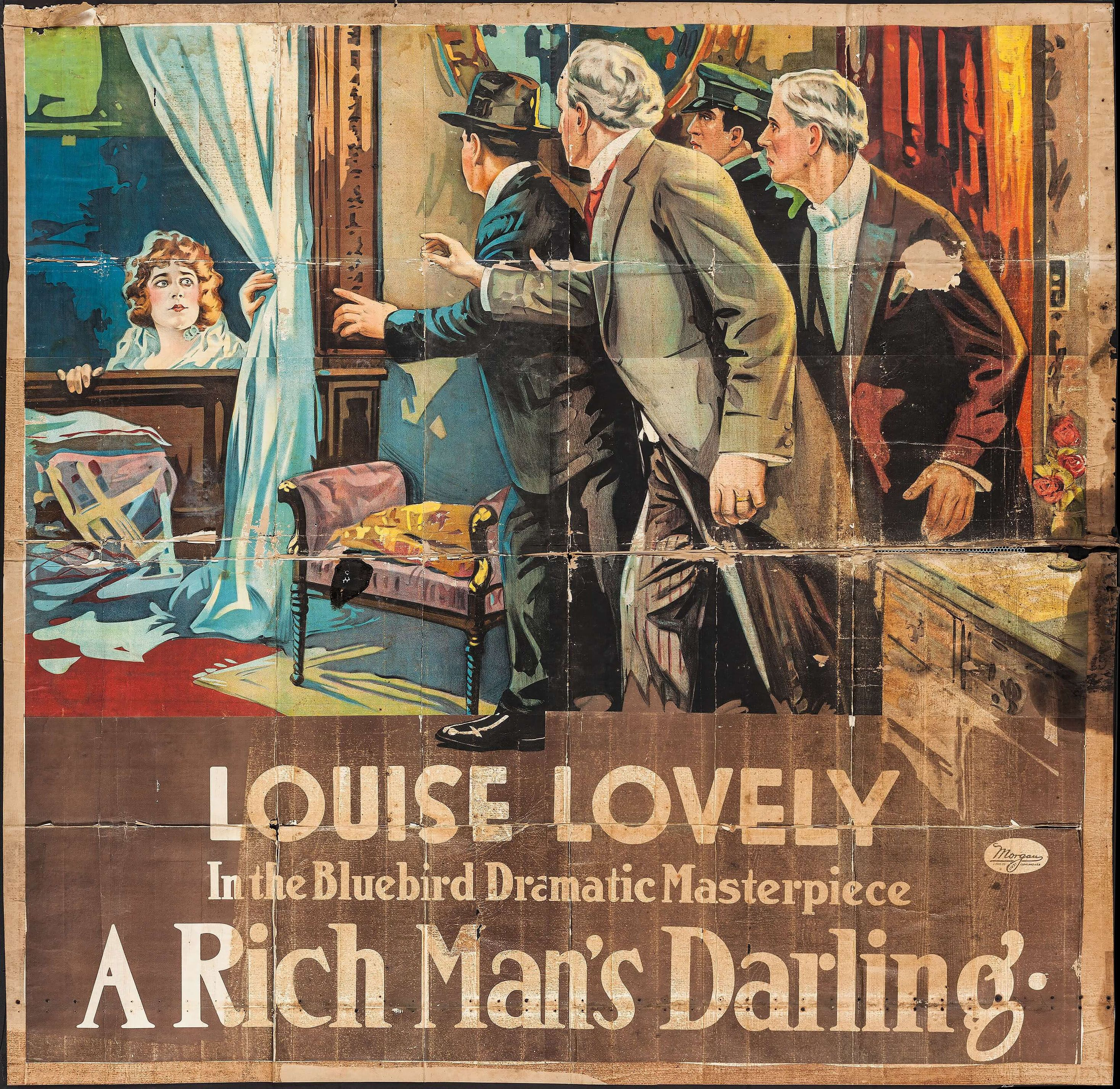
- Directed by: Edgar Jones
- Written by: Harvey Gates; Eugene B. Lewis
- Produced by: Louise Lovely
- Starring: Louise Lovely; Edna Maison; Philo McCullough
- Cinematography: Jack MacKenzie
- Production company: Universal Pictures
- Distributed by: Universal Pictures
- Release date: April 18, 1918
- Running time: 50 minutes
- Country: United States
- Languages: Silent; English intertitles

A Rich Man's Darling is a 1918 American silent comedy drama film directed by Edgar Jones and starring Louise Lovely, Edna Maison and Philo McCullough.

== Cast ==
- Louise Lovely as Julie Le Fabrier
- Edna Maison as Madame Ricardo
- Philo McCullough as Lee Brooks
- Harry Mann as Enrico Ricardo
- Harry Holden as Mason Brooks

== Bibliography ==
- Rainey, Buck. Sweethearts of the Sage: Biographies and Filmographies of 258 actresses appearing in Western movies. McFarland & Company, 1992.
