= The Capitol (film) =

1919 silent film

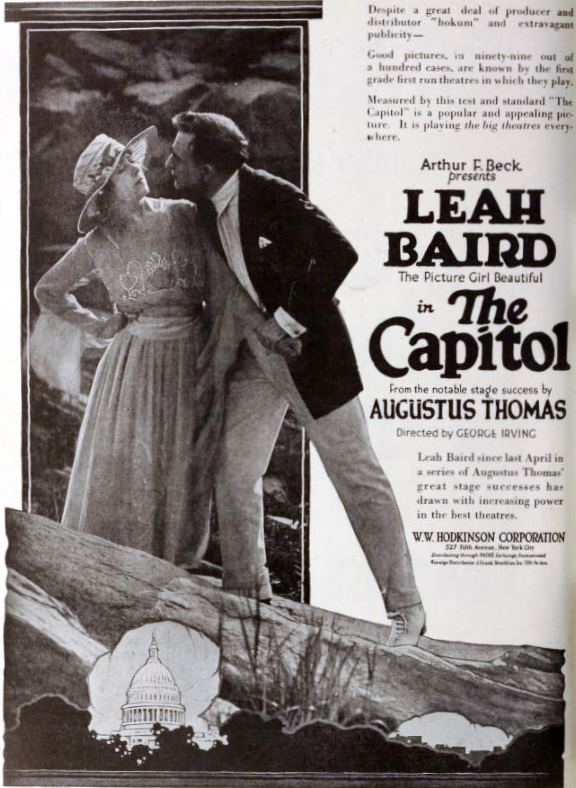
- Directed by: George Irving
- Written by: Augustus Thomas
- Based on: The Capitol by Augustus Thomas
- Starring: Leah Baird; Robert T. Haines; Alexander Gaden
- Cinematography: John W. Brown
- Production company: Artco Productions
- Distributed by: Hodkinson Pictures; Pathe Exchange
- Release date: December 1919
- Running time: 60 minutes
- Country: United States
- Languages: Silent; English intertitles

The Capitol is a 1919 American silent drama film directed by George Irving and starring Leah Baird, Robert T. Haines and Alexander Gaden.

== Cast ==
- Leah Baird as Margaret Kennard / Agnes Blake
- Robert T. Haines as Eustace Kennard
- Alexander Gaden as James Carroll
- William B. Davidson as Congressman Blake
- Downing Clarke as Henry Garretson
- Ben Hendricks Sr. as James Lamar
- Donald MacBride as Jimmy Vincent
- Mildred Rhoads as Baby Kennard

== Bibliography ==
- Goble, Alan. The Complete Index to Literary Sources in Film. Walter de Gruyter, 1999.
