= Don Quickshot of the Rio Grande =

1923 film

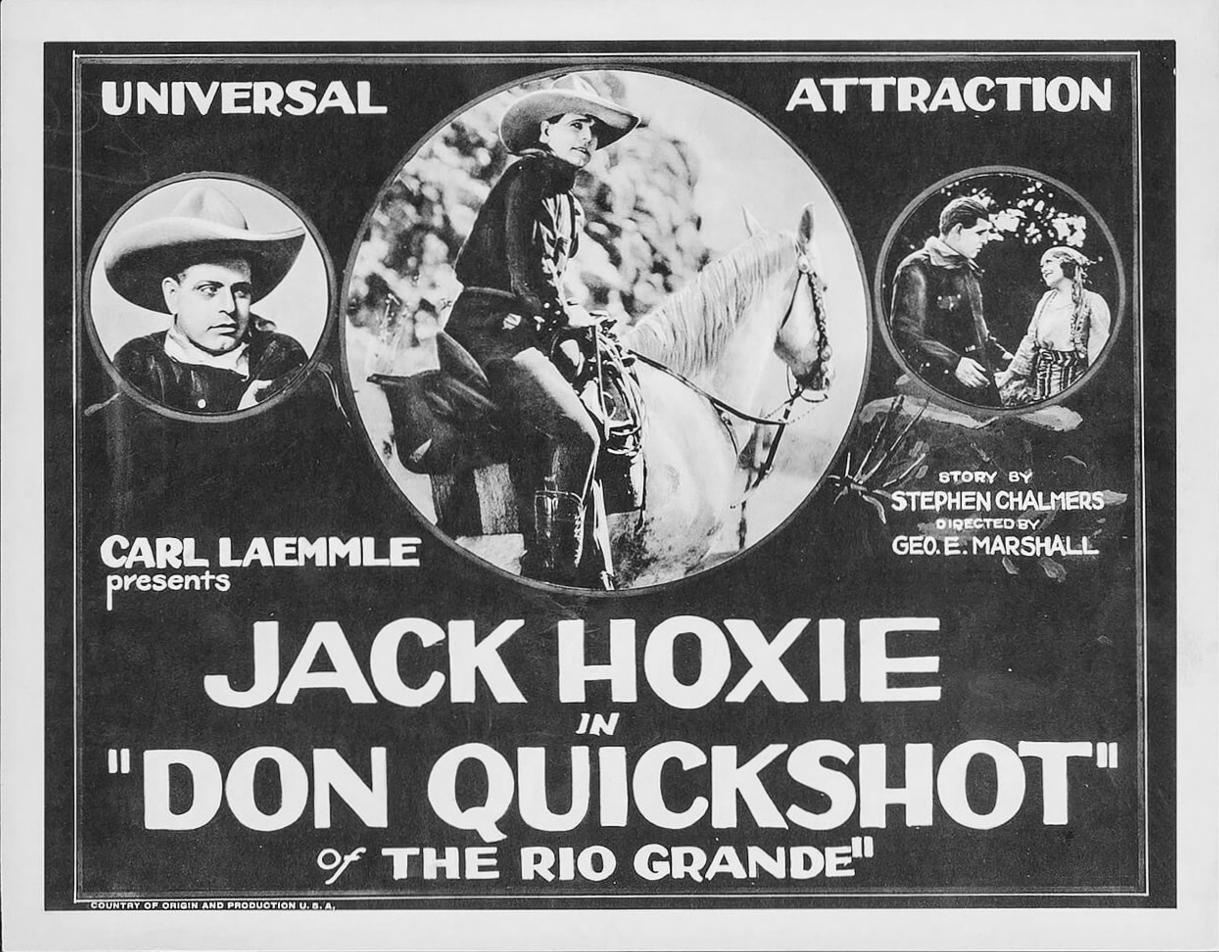
- Lobby card
- Directed by: George E. Marshall
- Written by: George Hively
- Based on: Don Quickshot of the Rio Grande by Stephen Chalmers
- Produced by: Carl Laemmle
- Starring: Jack Hoxie; Emmett King; Elinor Field; Fred C. Jones; William Steele; Bob McKenzie
- Cinematography: Charles E. Kaufman
- Production company: Universal Pictures
- Distributed by: Universal Pictures
- Release date: June 4, 1923
- Running time: 5 reels
- Country: United States
- Languages: Silent; English intertitles

Don Quickshot of the Rio Grande is a 1923 American silent Western film directed by George E. Marshall and written by George Hively. The film stars Jack Hoxie, Emmett King, Elinor Field, Fred C. Jones, William Steele, and Bob McKenzie. It is based on a 1921 short story of the same name by Stephen Chalmers. The film was released on June 4, 1923, by Universal Pictures. The film was Hoxie's first film with the company and Harry Woods's first screen credit.

The film had 5 reels.

== Cast ==
- Jack Hoxie as 'Pep' Pepper
- Emmett King as Jim Hellier
- Elinor Field as Tulip Hellier
- Fred C. Jones as George Vivian
- William Steele as Bill Barton
- Bob McKenzie as Sheriff Littlejohn
- Harry Woods as a Knight
- Hank Bell and Ben Corbett as Henchman
- Skeeter Bill Robbins as Barfly

== Preservation ==
A copy of Don Quickshot of the Rio Grande is housed at the UCLA Film & Television Archive.

== Reception ==
George Katchmer called the film "a top notch western with fantasy".
