= Emmett King =

American actor

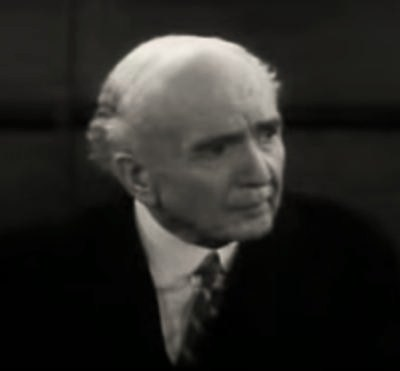
- Emmett King in Manhattan Tower (1932)
- Born: Emmett Carleton King; May 31, 1865; Griffin, Georgia, United States
- Died: April 21, 1953 (aged 87); Los Angeles, California, United States
- Occupation: Actor
- Years active: 1917–44
- Spouse: Helen

Emmett Carleton King (May 31, 1865 – April 21, 1953) was an American actor of the stage and screen.

== Biography ==
King began his acting career on stage. His first Broadway appearance was in 1899, in the farce, The Father of His Country, which he wrote and starred in. He would appear in several more Broadway productions over the next 15 years, including Mary Jane's Pa in 1908–09, and the 1911 production of Ben-Hur.

His screen career was mostly as a character actor, and spanned both the silent and sound film eras. He began his film career with a featured role in the 1917 silent film, Mary Jane's Pa, reprising the role he had played on Broadway almost a decade earlier. Other notable films in which he appeared include: the 1921 silent version of Little Lord Fauntleroy, starring Mary Pickford; 1922's The Beautiful and Damned, starring Marie Prevost and Kenneth Harlan; The Prisoner of Zenda (1937), starring Ronald Colman; James Whale's version of The Man in the Iron Mask in 1939, starring Louis Hayward and Joan Bennett; and Cecil B. DeMille's 1942 swashbuckler, Reap the Wild Wind, starring Ray Milland, John Wayne, and Paulette Goddard. His final screen performance was in a small role as a Senator in the 1944 biopic, Wilson, with an all-star cast headed by Charles Coburn, Alexander Knox, and Geraldine Fitzgerald.

King died at the age 87, in the Woodland Hills section of Los Angeles, California.

== Filmography ==
(Per AFI database)

- Mary Jane's Pa (1917)
- The Fair Pretender (1918)
- Out of the Night (1918)
- Lafayette, We Come (1918)
- The Fear Woman (1919)
- The Solitary Sin (1919)
- Fools and Their Money (1919)
- Please Get Married (1919)
- Beckoning Roads (1919)
- Billions (1920)
- The Desperate Hero (1920)
- The Best of Luck (1920)
- Number 99 (1920)
- Habit (1921)
- Three Sevens (1921)
- The Mistress of Shenstone (1921)
- The Silver Car (1921)
- Lying Lips (1921)
- Little Lord Fauntleroy (1921)
- Flower of the North (1921)
- Eden and Return (1921)
- Fightin' Mad (1921)
- The Call of Home (1922)
- The Adventures of Robinson Crusoe (1922)
- Human Hearts (1922)
- The Kentucky Derby (1922)
- Manslaughter (1922)
- The Acquittal (1923)
- The Beautiful and Damned (1923)
- The Day of Faith (1923)
- Don Quickshot of the Rio Grande (1923)
- The Flame of Life (1923)
- The Near Lady (1923)
- Trifling with Honor (1923)
- White Tiger (1923)
- The Air Hawk (1924)
- Barbara Frietchie (1924)
- Captain January (1924)
- Dark Stairways (1924)
- The Fighting American (1924)
- Pampered Youth (1925)
- The Devil's Cargo (1925)
- The Man Without a Country (1925)
- The Overland Limited (1925)
- Peacock Feathers (1925)
- Counsel for the Defense (1925)
- The Arizona Sweepstakes (1926)
- The Man in the Saddle (1926)
- God of Mankind (1928)
- Midnight Madness (1928)
- The Shopworn Angel (1928)
- Laugh, Clown, Laugh (1928)
- West of Zanzibar (1928)
- When Dreams Come True (1929)
- Reno (1930)
- Westward Passage (1932)
- The World Moves On (1934)
- Clive of India (1935)
- The President Vanishes (1935)
- Diamond Jim (1935)
- Three Kids and a Queen (1935)
- The Crime of Dr. Forbes (1936)
- Life Begins with Love (1937)
- The Prisoner of Zenda (1937)
- The Man in the Iron Mask (1939)
- Highway Hell (1941)
- Reap the Wild Wind (1942)
- Wilson (1945)
