= Richelieu (1914 film) =

1914 film

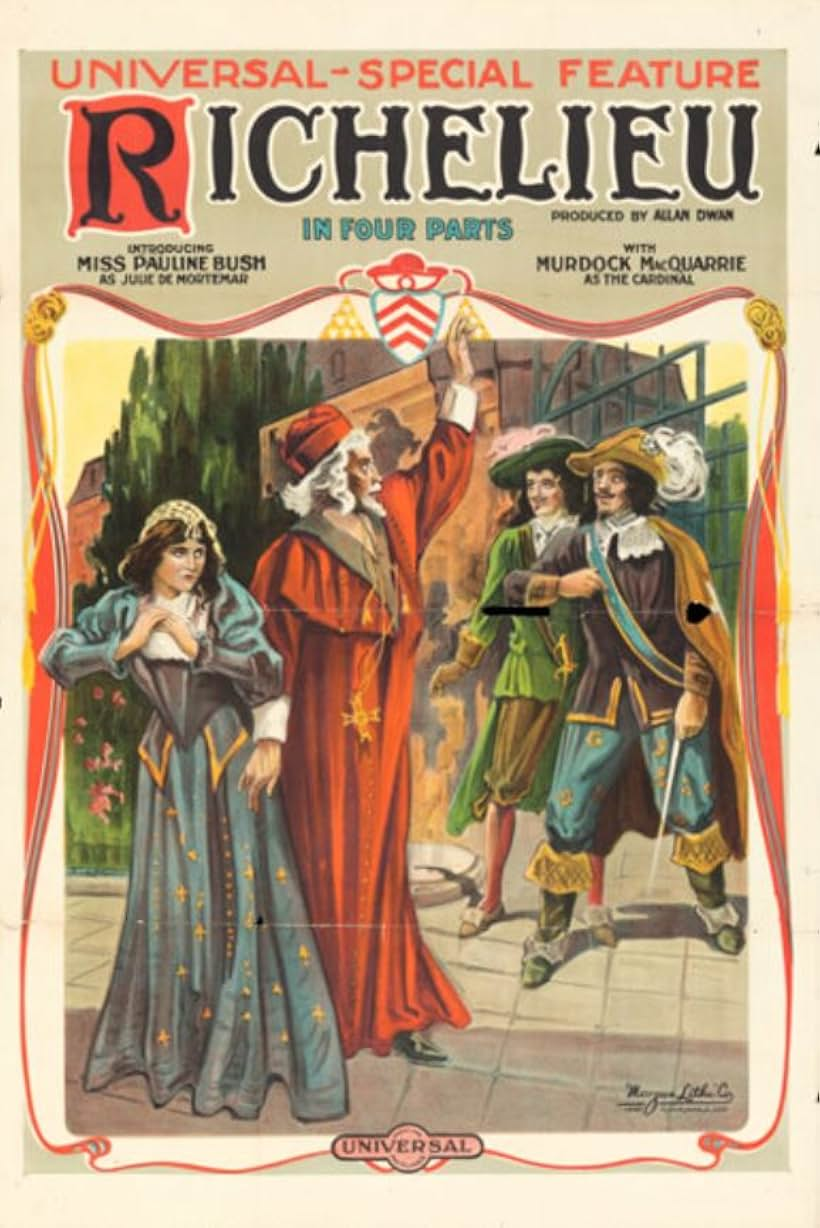
- Directed by: Allan Dwan
- Written by: Edward Bulwer-Lytton; Allan Dwan
- Starring: Murdock MacQuarrie; William C. Dowlan; Pauline Bush
- Distributed by: Universal Pictures
- Release date: September 26, 1914
- Running time: 6 reels later recut to 4 reels
- Country: United States
- Language: Silent with English intertitles

Richelieu is a 1914 American silent historical drama film written and directed by Allan Dwan, based on the play Richelieu written by Edward Bulwer-Lytton. It featured Lon Chaney, Murdock MacQuarrie and Pauline Bush. This was Allan Dwan's last film for Universal, as he moved to New York afterward to work at the Famous Players Company and married his lead actress Pauline Bush in 1915.

Originally released in March 1914 at six reels in length (making it Chaney's first full-length feature), Universal eventually cut it down to four reels and put it out on September 26, 1914 as part of its regular programme of pictures. Upon viewing the original 6-reel version, Moving Picture World had written in their review, "A six-reel production of the celebrated Cardinal Richelieu, following the lines of the famous play by that name.... The plot is a highly interesting one toward the close, but the action in the first three reels is rather slow and confusing. This would have been much stronger as either a three or four reel production." The film is now considered to be lost. Neither the 6-reel nor the 4-reel version survives.

== Plot ==
In 17th-century France, Cardinal Richelieu sends Adrien de Mauprat, who is in love with Richelieu's ward Julie de Mortemar, off to fight the Spanish, as punishment for his disobedience in an earlier military conflict. Baradas, a favorite of King Louis XIII, is also in love with Julie, and envies de Mauprat's victories when he winds up winning in battle and returning home a hero. Baradas convinces de Mauprat that the cardinal is plotting against him and draws him into a scheme to kill the cardinal and seize the throne. Richelieu learns of the plot and De Mauprat is imprisoned and sentenced to be executed. Julie pleads for the release of her lover and winds up getting permission to marry him, and de Mauprat is released. Baradas is imprisoned instead, Julie winds up marrying de Mauprat, and Richelieu is restored to power.

== Cast ==
- Murdock MacQuarrie as Cardinal Richelieu
- William C. Dowlan as Adrien de Mauprat
- Lon Chaney as Baradas
- Pauline Bush as Julie de Mortemar
- James Robert Chandler as Sieur de Beringhen
- Edna Maison as Marion de Lormer
- James Neill as The King
- Richard Rosson as François
- Edythe Chapman as The Queen
- William Lloyd as Joseph
- Frank Rice as Huget

== Reception ==
Motion Picture News wrote: "It is hardly necessary to say that (Allan Dwan) has succeeded in really reproducing this section from this momentous and troubling time in France.....Mr. MacQuarrie's portrayal of Richelieu is really a fine piece of acting." Moving Picture World wrote: "This finely photographed four-reel production of "Richelieu", besides being good entertainment, has a pleasing historical interest...The costuming is pleasing throughout this production, the photography is exceptionally smooth and inviting, and the choice of settings admirable."

== Censorship ==
The Chicago Board of Censors cut out the close-up of the executioner with his axe, and removed the intertitle "Your husband knows the King's degrading suit and deems it honor."

== Bibliography ==
- Frederic Lombardi. Allan Dwan and the Rise and Decline of the Hollywood Studios. McFarland, 2013.
