= Undine (1916 film) =

1916 film by Henry Otto

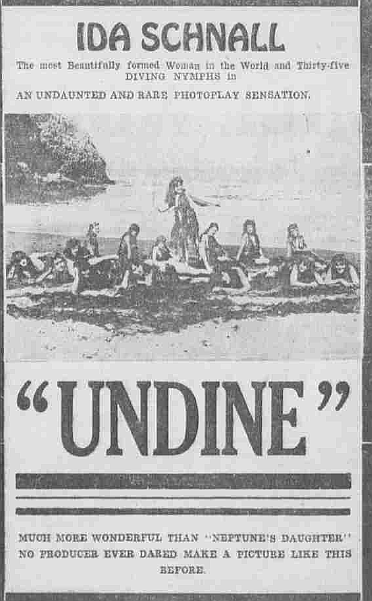
- Film poster
- Directed by: Henry Otto
- Written by: Walter Woods
- Based on: Undine by Friedrich de la Motte Fouque
- Produced by: Henry Otto
- Starring: Ida Schnall; Douglas Gerrard
- Cinematography: Fred Granville
- Production company: Bluebird Photoplays
- Distributed by: Universal Pictures
- Release date: February 7, 1916
- Running time: 5 reels (approximately 65 minutes)
- Country: United States
- Language: Silent (English intertitles)

Undine is a 1916 American silent fantasy drama film which featured the athletic actress Ida Schnall in a water-themed story based upon the fairy tale Undine by Friedrich de la Motte Fouque. The film was directed by Henry Otto and produced and distributed by the Bluebird Photoplays division of Universal Film Manufacturing Company. It is not known whether the film currently survives.

== Plot ==
As described in a film review, a father reads the story of Undine to his girl from a book. Undine (Schnall) the first is the cleverest of the water nymphs under Queen Unda, mistress of the underseas. Undine is always the leader in all feats of daring and outdives and outswims all of her companions. The revels of the nymphs on land and shore are clearly shown. But Undine falls in love with Waldo (Nelson), a mortal, and leaves her companions to live in happiness at the edge of the sea. One day Waldo goes into the enchanted forest and slays a sacred deer, and in revenge Kuhleborn (Zerr), ruler of the forest, slays him. Undine the first dies of grief on the beach, and when she is found by her companions they discover that there has been born Undine the second. As punishment for the crime the mother has committed, Undine the second is destined to live among mortals until a pure love shall atone for the sin. The young child of simple fisherfolk is stolen by the nymphs and made to roam the enchanted forest, while Undine the second is left where the bereft mother will find her and rear her as her own. In later years Huldbrand (Gerrard), a suitor for the hand of the Lady Berthelda (Maison), who is actually the daughter of the fisherfolk and raised by the duke and duchess, ventures into the enchanted forest. He is seen by Kuhleborn drinking from a fountain, which designates him as the one that shall seek out Undine and marry her. An enchantment is placed on the knight, and he discovers her and marries her. On his taking her back to the castle, Kuhleborn again appears and, declaring Undine's mission among the mortals on earth has been served, sends her back to the sea by his enchantment.

== Cast ==
- Ida Schnall as Undine
- Douglas Gerrard as Huldbrand
- Edna Maison as Lady Berthelda
- Carol Stellson as the duke
- Caroline Fowler as the duchess
- O. C. Jackson as the fisherman
- Josephine Rice as the fisherman's wife
- Elijah Zerr as Kuhleborn
- Jack Nelson as Waldo
- Thomas Delmer as Father Heilmann
- Eileen Allen
- Grace Astor

== Production ==
Location scenes of Undine were filmed at Santa Cruz Island, one of the Channel Islands of California.

== Reception ==
One critic suggested that a better title would have been Undressed due to Schnall's lack of clothing in the film. Another stated, "No one really cared much about the plot of Undine: It was enough that sylphlike Ida Schnall showed up from time to time in various stages of near nudity." However, the film evaded censorship, with censor boards upon viewing the film finding it neither vulgar or suggestive, but artistic. In St. Louis, local police took an alternate position arresting Chippewa Theatre owner James J. Barrett and Universal Film's Barney Rosentahal for showing an immoral film specifically for a "nymph rescuing a man from drowning." After showing the edited film a week later, Barrett, Rosenthal and Sydney Baker who managed the Bluebird Photoplay Company, were charged with showing scenes of women bathing "without draperies."

== Lobby cards ==
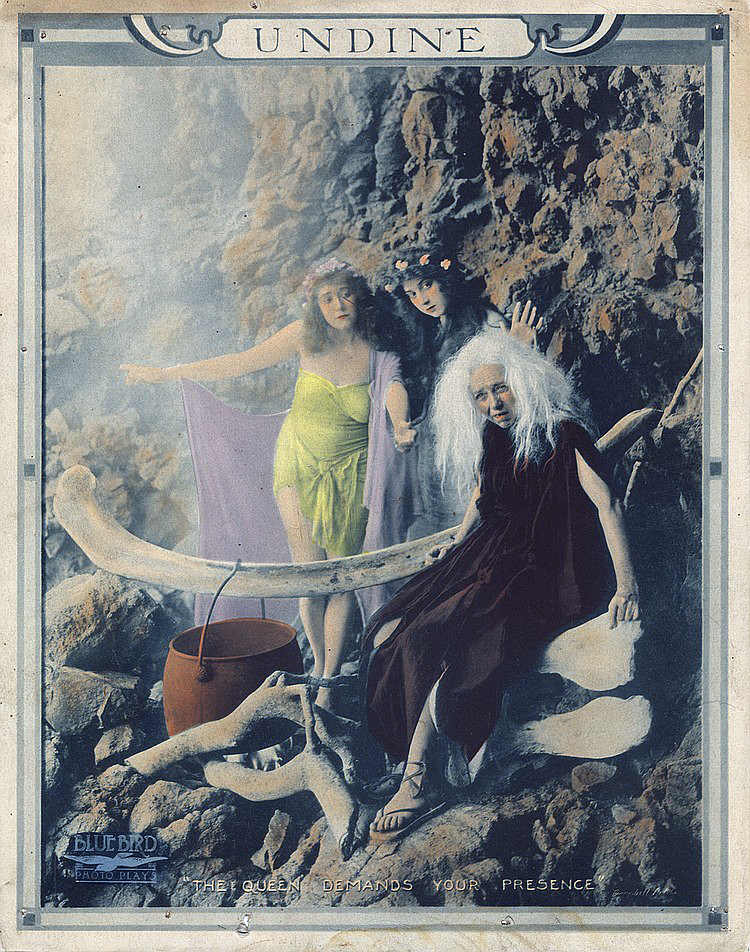

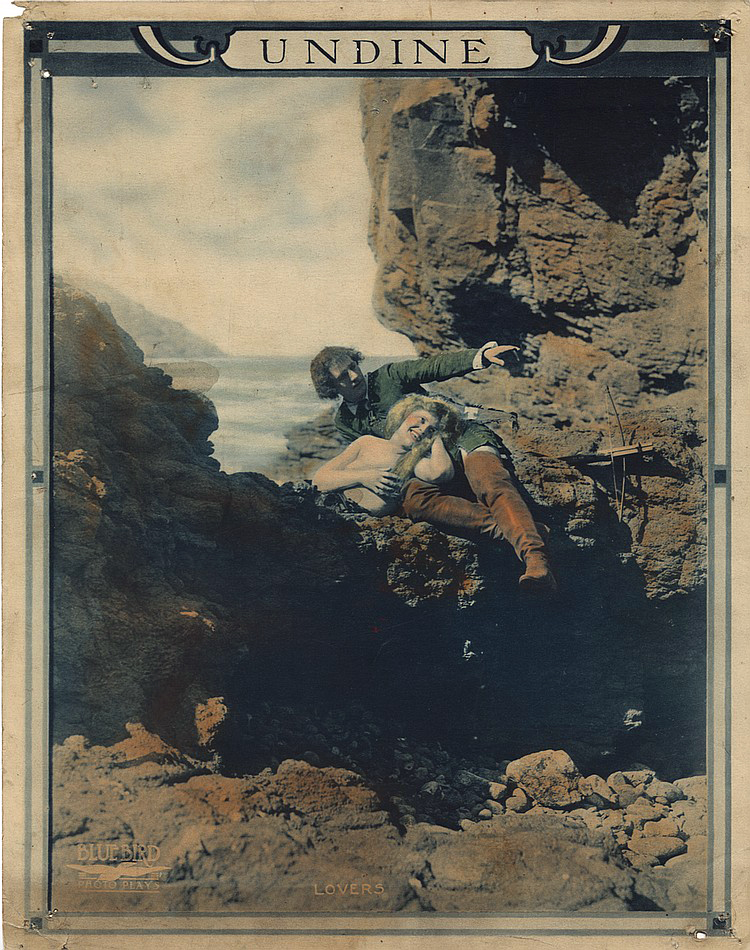

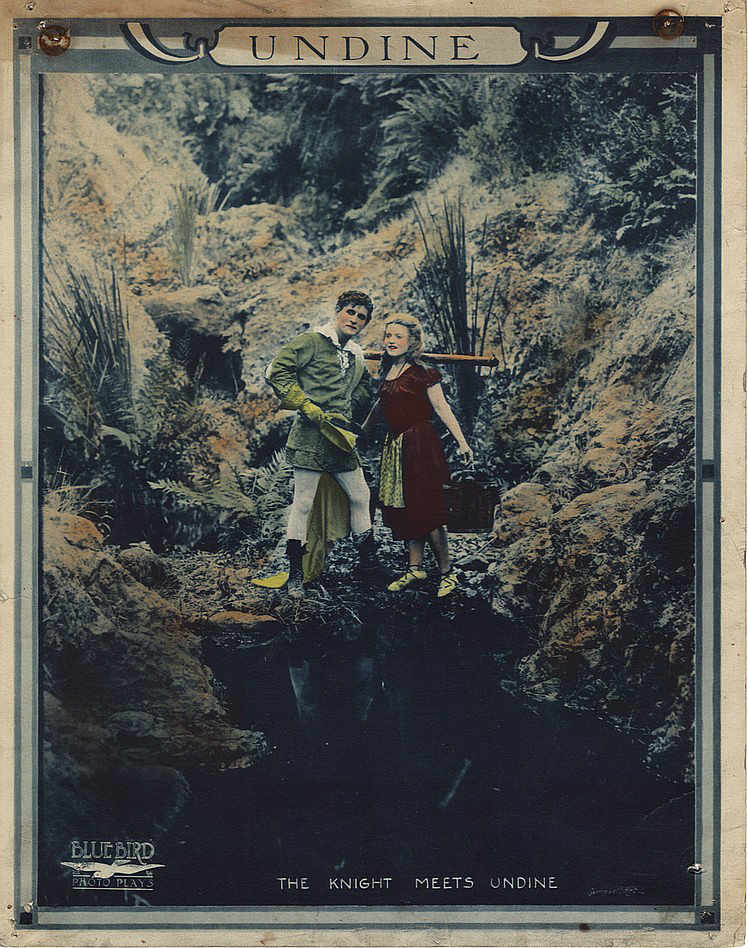

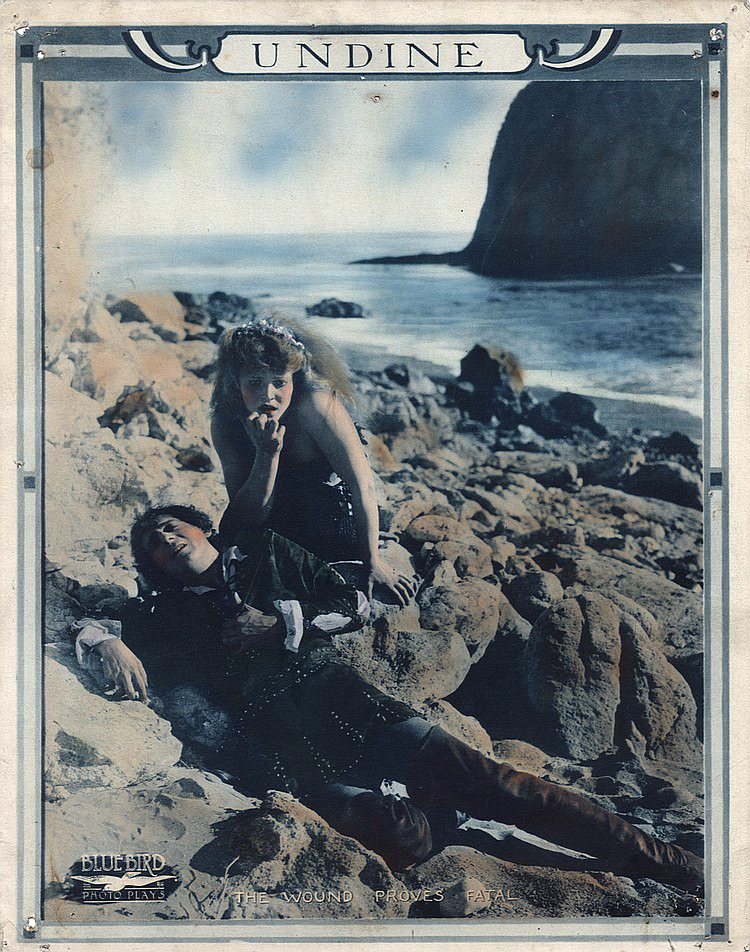

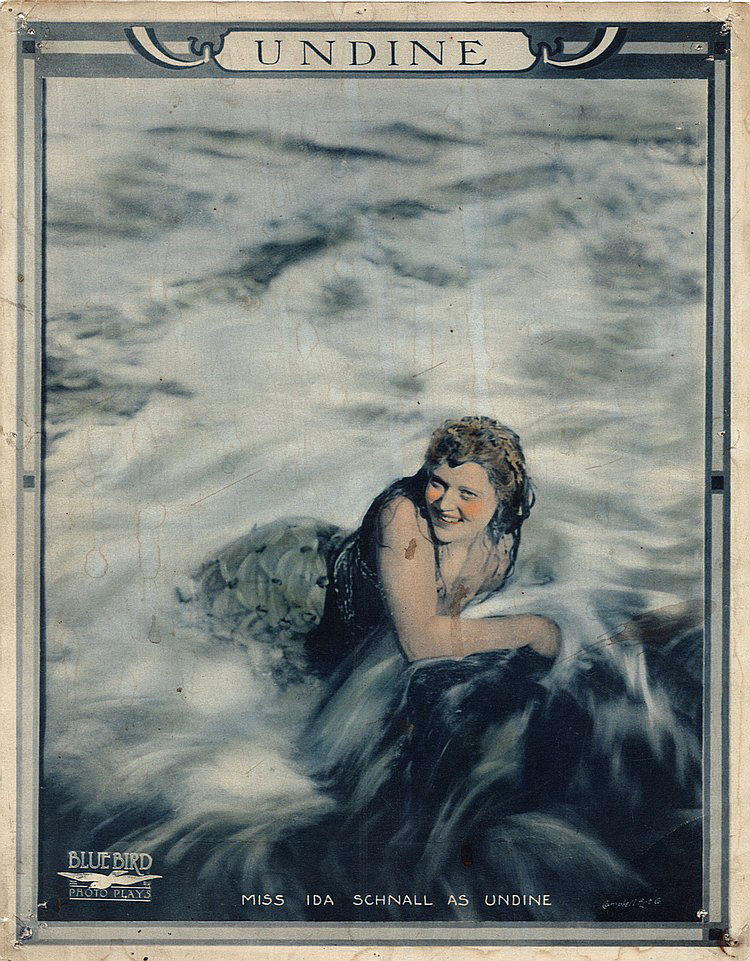

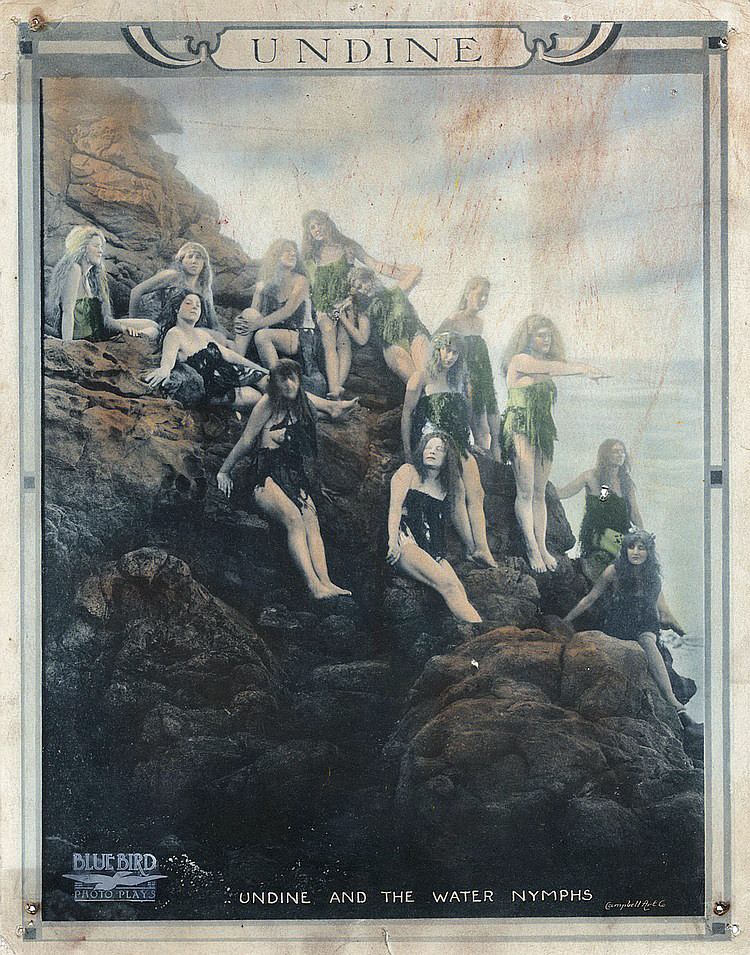

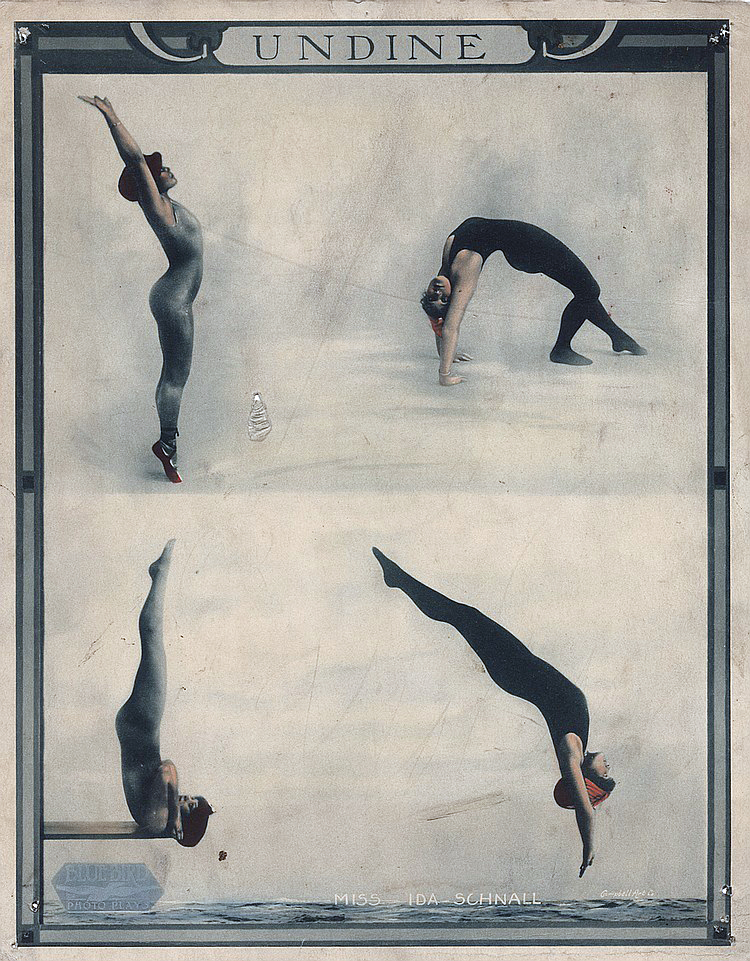
