= The College Coquette =

1929 film

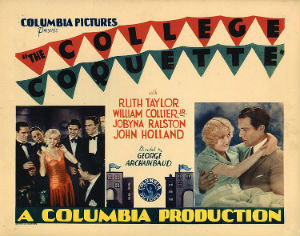
- Theatrical release poster
- Directed by: George Archainbaud
- Screenplay by: Norman Houston
- Story by: Ralph Graves
- Produced by: Harry Cohn
- Starring: Ruth Taylor; William Collier Jr. Jobyna Ralston; John Holland; Adda Gleason; Gretchen Hartman
- Cinematography: Jackson Rose
- Edited by: Gene Havlick
- Production company: Columbia Pictures
- Distributed by: Columbia Pictures
- Release date: August 5, 1929
- Running time: 68 minutes
- Country: United States
- Language: English

The College Coquette is a 1929 American pre-Code drama film directed by George Archainbaud and written by Norman Houston. The film stars Ruth Taylor, William Collier Jr., Jobyna Ralston, John Holland, Adda Gleason, and Gretchen Hartman. The film was released on August 5, 1929, by Columbia Pictures.

== Plot ==
Betty Forrester (Ruth Taylor), a vivacious flapper, arrives at Dexter College in her own flashy roadster, quickly establishing herself as one of the most talked-about girls on campus. Outgoing and flirtatious, she enjoys the attention of the male students, who trail after her wherever she goes. Though she plays the part of a co-ed vampire, leading them on with coquettish banter, Betty's motives are more complicated: she wants to attract the notice of the upright athletic coach, Harvey Porter (John Holland).

Sharing her dormitory room is Doris Marlowe (Jobyna Ralston), an innocent and sheltered girl from a good family. Doris falls quickly and deeply in love with Tom Marion (William Collier Jr.), a dashing but unreliable senior with a reputation as a heartbreaker. Tom has no real affection for Doris; she is only the latest conquest in his long string of flirtations. Doris, however, is swept away by his charm.

The undergraduates’ social life is marked by wild parties, liquor, and late-night dances, with campus characters like Slim (Edward Peil Jr.), Ted (Eddie Clayton), and Jimmy Doolittle (Maurice Murphy) providing comic relief. Betty herself becomes the center of attention at these gatherings, playing up her image as the campus flirt. All the while, Coach Porter remains cool and disapproving, despite his own attraction to her.

At one of the college dances, Porter finally breaks through his reserve and admits his love for Betty. She is elated—but her roommate is already in danger. Doris, lured by Tom, has gone to his room for a party.

When Betty learns of Doris' whereabouts, she rushes to intervene. She finds her roommate intoxicated and refusing to leave Tom's side. To protect Doris from disgrace, Betty takes a bold course: she deliberately flirts with Tom herself, drawing his attention away from Doris. Humiliated and heartbroken, Doris slips away and goes home.

The next day, still dazed, Doris visits Tom's home. There she overhears him laughing with Betty, boasting that he had only been stringing Doris along and never cared for her. Shattered by this revelation, Doris takes her own life—falling to her death down an elevator shaft.

To protect Doris' reputation and spare her family, Betty publicly takes the blame, declaring that it was she, not Doris, who had been carrying on with Tom and broken her roommate's heart. Branded a coquette and dismissed from college, Betty suffers the scorn of both classmates and the man she loves. Coach Porter, believing she is nothing more than a reckless flirt, swears never to see her again.

Tom, guilty over Doris' death, finally admits the truth to Porter—that it was his callous behavior, not Betty's, that destroyed the girl. Realizing Betty's noble sacrifice, Porter rushes to her side. He begs forgiveness for doubting her and asks her to be his wife. For Betty, once a playful flirt, the moment is one of vindication and redemption: her selfless act has cost her reputation, but won her lasting love.

== Cast ==
- Ruth Taylor as Betty Forrester
- William Collier Jr. as Tom Marion
- Jobyna Ralston as Doris Marlowe
- John Holland as Coach Harvey Porter
- Adda Gleason as Mrs. Ethel Forrester
- Gretchen Hartman as Mrs. Marlowe
- Frances Lyons as Edna
- Edward Peil Jr. as Slim
- Eddie Clayton as Ted
- Maurice Murphy as Jimmy Doolittle
- Billy Taft as Boy with ukulele

== Music ==
The film features a theme song entitled "I Want To Be Good And Bad."

== Reception ==
Screenland called the film "Just another college picture!" and criticized it for the use of clichés and "a story without merit."

Exhibitors Herald-World published two reviews, the first of which had a similar tone as Screenland, writing "Just another petting party, just another track race, another football game and you have all four of the college pictures that have been made this year. The public is sick of them." The second review felt it was a "Pretty good college picture" but criticized Ruth Taylor's performance.

=== Censorship ===
The Commonwealth Film Censorship Board refused to permit the film to be released in Australia, a decision upheld by the Censor Appeals Board. At the time, approximately half of all foreign films submitted were rejected by the Board.

== See also ==
- List of early sound feature films (1926–1929)
