= The Bandbox =

1919 film

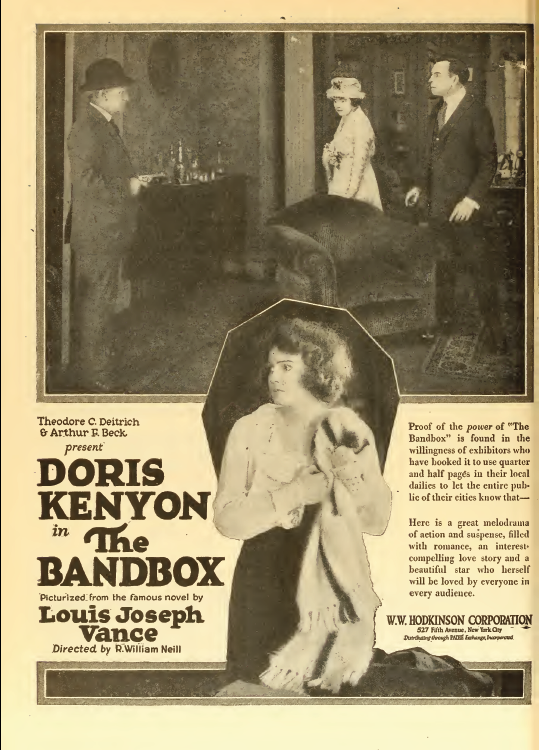
- Directed by: Roy William Neill
- Written by: Roy Somerville
- Based on: The Bandbox by Louis Joseph Vance
- Starring: Doris Kenyon; Walter McEwen; Gretchen Hartman
- Cinematography: Ned Van Buren; Edward Wynard
- Production company: Deitrich-Beck
- Distributed by: Hodkinson Pictures; Pathé Exchange
- Release date: November 22, 1919
- Running time: 60 minutes
- Country: United States
- Languages: Silent; English intertitles

The Bandbox is a 1919 American silent mystery crime film directed by Roy William Neill and starring Doris Kenyon, Walter McEwen and Gretchen Hartman. It is based on the 1912 novel of the same title by Louis Joseph Vance. Location shooting took place in Central Park and on Lake Mohegan in New York State.

== Plot ==
A pearl necklace is smuggled through customs without paying duty after arriving in America from an ocean liner and a gang of criminals hot on the trail of them.

== Cast ==
- Doris Kenyon as Eleanor Searle
- Walter McEwen as Arbuthnot Ismay / William H. Iff
- Gretchen Hartman as Alison Landis
- Edward Keppler as Arthur Arkroyd
- Maggie Weston as Mrs. Clover
- Logan Paul as Ehraim Clover
- Lorraine Harding as Marie
- Alexander Gaden as Benjamin Staff

== Preservation ==
With no holdings located in archives, The Bandbox is considered a lost film.

== Bibliography ==
- Connelly, Robert B. The Silents: Silent Feature Films, 1910–36, Volume 40, Issue 2. December Press, 1998.
- Munden, Kenneth White. The American Film Institute Catalog of Motion Pictures Produced in the United States, Part 1. University of California Press, 1997.
