= Henry E. Dixey =

American actor (1859–1943)

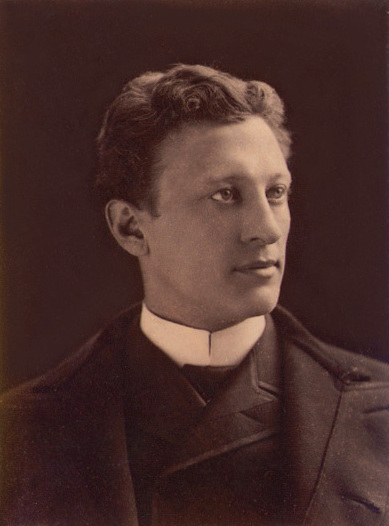
Henry E. Dixey

Henry E. Dixey (born Henry E. Dixon; January 6, 1859 – February 25, 1943) was an American actor and theatre producer.

Dixey was born on January 6, 1859, in Boston, Massachusetts. He made his stage debut in Boston in 1868, joining the variety stock actors at the Howard Athenaeum, where in 1869 he played the character Peanuts in the Augustin Daly play Under the Gaslight. Dixey starred in many plays and musicals, including his best-known role as the lead character in the popular burlesque musical Adonis, which he played from 1883 to 1885, occasionally joining tours afterwards. He performed on stage and in a handful of films until 1926.

In addition to burlesques, comedies, and operettas, Dixey had a magic act as "Dixey, the Magnificent." He ventured into silent films in 1908, acting the title role in David Garrick. He also appeared in the films Chelsea 7750 (1913) and Father and Son (1916).

Dixey was one of a party of gentlemen entertained by Robert Emmet Odlum, brother of women's rights activist Charlotte Odlum Smith, on the morning of May 19, 1885, the day he jumped from the Brooklyn Bridge and was killed. Dixey used his gold stopwatch to time Odlum's fatal jump at three and a half seconds.

His wife was Marie Nordstrom, who had performed in various plays written by her sister Frances Nordstrom. Their daughter was children's publisher Ursula Nordstrom.

Dixey died February 25, 1943, in Atlantic City, New Jersey following a traffic accident.
