= The Spy (1914 film) =

- Directed by: Otis Turner
- Written by: James Dayton
- Based on: The Spy by James Fenimore Cooper
- Starring: Herbert Rawlinson; Edna Maison; Ella Hall; William Worthington
- Distributed by: Universal Film Manufacturing Company
- Release date: June 1914
- Running time: 4 reels
- Country: United States
- Language: Silent (English intertitles)

The Spy is a 1914 American silent adventure film based on the 1821 novel of the same name by James Fenimore Cooper, directed by Otis Turner, and released by Universal Studios.

== Cast ==
- Herbert Rawlinson as Harvey Birch (the spy)
- Edna Maison as Katrie (sweetheart of Harvey Birch)
- Ella Hall as Frances Wharton
- William Worthington as Gen. Washington
- Edward Alexander as Maj. Dunwoodie
- Rex De Rosselli as Mr. Wharton
- J. W. Pike as Henry (son of Mr. Wharton)
- Frank Lloyd as Jake Parsons

== See also ==
- List of films about the American Revolution
