= James Edward Sullivan =

American sports official (1862–1914)

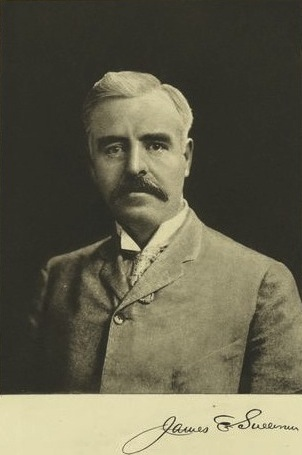
James Edward Sullivan, 1909

Ida Schnall in the New York Times in 1912

James Edward Sullivan (18 November 1862 – 16 September 1914) was an American sports official of Irish descent. He was one of the founders of the Amateur Athletic Union (AAU) on Jan 21, 1888, serving as its secretary from 1889 until 1906 when he was elected as President of the Amateur Athletic Union from 1906 to 1909. He declined a fourth term and was re-elected to his former position as secretary-treasurer until his sudden death which followed an emergency operation. Sullivan also served as the chairman of the Greater New York Irish Athletic Association in 1903 and on the New York City Board of Education from 1908 to 1912. In 1911 he served as chairman of the New York State Athletic Commission.

== Biography ==
He was born on 18 November 1862 in New York City.

His business career began in 1878 at Frank Leslie's publications. In 1880, he started a paper The Athletics News. His career continued in sports publishing, and sporting goods businesses. His athletics on the track had started in 1877 as a member of the Pastime Athletic Club. In 1888 and 1889 he won the all round championship of the club.

He also was one of the most influential people in the early Olympic movement, although his relationship with IOC president Pierre de Coubertin was tense. Sullivan was also an organizer of the Outdoor Recreation League and served as its second president. Sullivan was the advertising representative of Spalding, which provided running shoes, implements, balls and gloves for many sports.

== 1904 St. Louis Olympic Games ==
Sullivan was a chief organizer of the 1904 Summer Olympics. He decided to allow only one water station on the 24.85-mile course of the marathon even though it was conducted in 32 °C (90 °F) heat over unpaved roads choked with dust. His ostensible reason was to conduct research on "purposeful dehydration," even though dehydration is potentially fatal. The marathon ended with the worst ratio of entrants to finishers (14 of 32) and by far the slowest winning time, 3:28:45, almost 30 minutes slower than the next slowest winning time at the 1900 Summer Olympics. He also organized the Anthropology Days, a racist and cynical attempt to demonstrate athletic white superiority.

== 1912 Olympic Games ==
The 1912 Summer Olympics allowed female divers and swimmers, but Sullivan, on behalf of the United States Olympic Committee, barred American women from participating even though there were capable women willing to participate.

American athlete of Indian origin Jim Thorpe competed in the 1912 games and won gold medals in the pentathlon and the decathlon. However, those medals were stripped by the AAU and the USOC, with Sullivan playing a prominent role in the decision, following reports that Thorpe had previously played semi-professional baseball. There is evidence that the AAU was aware of Thorpe's status before the games and allowed him to compete, only to rescind his medals afterward. Thorpe's gold medals were posthumously restored to him in 1983 and presented to his children in a solemn ceremony.

== Death and funeral ==
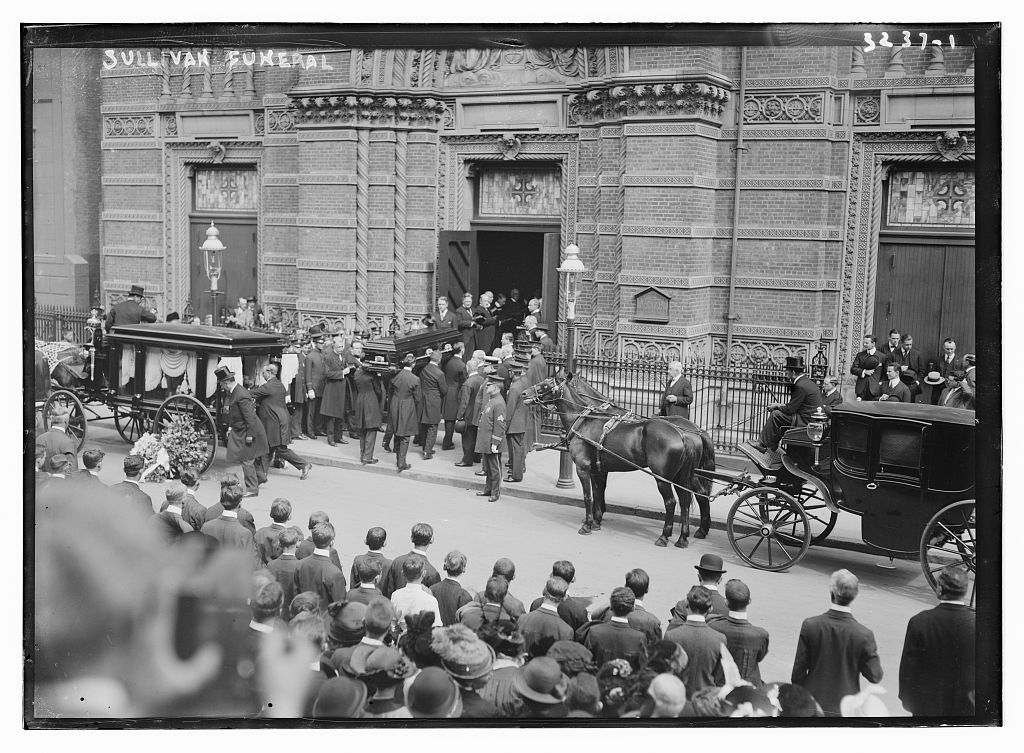
Funeral on 19 September 1914

In 1911 he was injured in a train wreck in Fort Wayne, Indiana. He died on 16 September 1914 at Mount Sinai Hospital, New York, after an operation on his intestines. For the funeral on 19 September 1914, his body was conveyed from his home, 540 West 114th Street, to St. Aloysius Gonzaga's Church, at 132d Street and Seventh Avenue, where a requiem Mass was held.

== Legacy ==
James E. Sullivan created The Athletic News in 1880. After his death, the 1914 National Outdoor Track and Field Championships were postponed from September 19 to October 3, 1914, in his honor. In 1930, the AAU established the James E. Sullivan Award in his honour. It is awarded annually to the best amateur athlete in the US. In 1977, he was inducted into the National Track & Field Hall of Fame.

Sullivan was also the Records Chair for the Amateur Athletic Union (AAU).

== Publications ==
- The Olympic games, Athens, Spalding Athletic Library (1906)
- The Olympic games, Stockholm, Spalding Athletic Library (1912)
- "An Athletic Primer", Spalding Athletic Library (1907)
- "Official Athletic Almanac", Spalding Athletic Library (1905 to 1922)

Sullivan was the first President of the American Sports Publishing Company which published the Spalding Athletic Library. Sullivan was editor of several publications.

Sullivan created The Athletic News in 1880. The Athletic News in 1880 was the first USA track and field publication.
