= Frances Nordstrom =

American actress and playwright (born 1883)

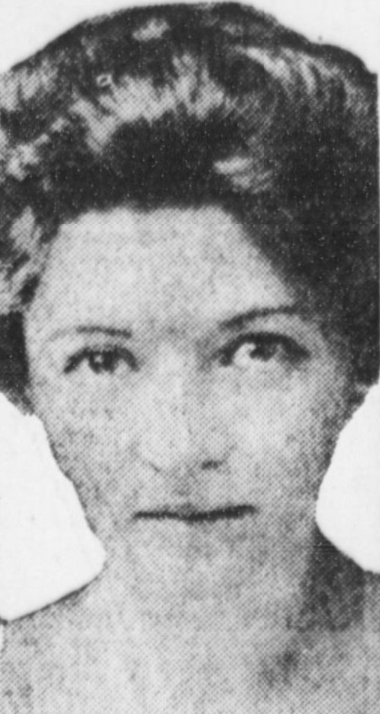
Frances Nordstrom. c. 1915

Frances Nordstrom (born June 1883 in Fort Davis, Texas) was an American actress and playwright.

== Early years ==
Born in Fort Davis, Texas, Nordstrom was the daughter of United States Cavalry Captain Charles E. Nordstrom. He had command of that fort, and she lived her first 16 years there. She was the younger sister of actress Marie Nordstrom. After their father died, the sisters and their mother moved to Washington, where Nordstrom attended the Georgetown Convent school.

Nordstrom became interested in the theater when, as a youth, she and her sister attended a play in San Antonio, Texas. She told a reporter in 1908, "... our youthful minds were entranced, whereupon we each resolved that when we grew to womanhood we were going to be actresses." After they moved to Washington, both sisters attended more plays, which reinforced their interest in acting careers.

== Acting ==
Nordstrom's early acting experiences included work with the Baldwin-Melville Stock Company in Buffalo, New York, in 1903. Her work in stock theater led to a progression from character roles to portraying ingenues to being a leading woman. In 1904, she had to leave acting temporarily because of blood poisoning that developed from a severe burn. In 1909, Nordstrom joined Oliver Morosco's stock theater company in California. Her Broadway acting credits include Cheer Up (1912).

== Writing ==
Nordstrom began writing prior to World War I. After achieving success writing vaudeville sketches and one-act plays, she wrote Room 44, a three-act farce, and other plays. Her body of work led to a three-year contract with Cohan and Harris for all of the plays that she wrote during that period. At times, she acted in a play that she had written, as in a production of The Ruined Lady in 1920. Broadway productions for which Nordstrom wrote include Lady Bug (1922), Music Box Revue (1921), Snapshots of 1921, and The Ruined Lady (1920). Later, after moving to Los Angeles, she began to write for films.

== Personal life ==
On November 8, 1905, Nordstrom married actor James Carlisle Spottswood in New Orleans.
