= Mary Jane's Pa =

1935 film by William Keighley

- Directed by: William Keighley
- Screenplay by: Tom Reed; Peter Milne
- Based on: 1908 play Mary Jane's Pa by Edith Ellis Furness; 1909 novel Mary Jane's Pa by Norman Way
- Produced by: Robert Presnell Sr.
- Starring: Aline MacMahon; Guy Kibbee; Tom Brown; Robert McWade; Minor Watson; Nan Grey
- Cinematography: Ernest Haller
- Edited by: Clarence Kolster
- Music by: Heinz Roemheld
- Production company: First National Pictures
- Distributed by: Warner Bros. Pictures
- Release date: April 27, 1935
- Running time: 70 minutes
- Country: United States
- Language: English

Mary Jane's Pa is a 1935 American drama film directed by William Keighley and written by Tom Reed and Peter Milne. The film stars Aline MacMahon, Guy Kibbee, Tom Brown, Robert McWade, Minor Watson, and Nan Grey. The film was released by Warner Bros. Pictures on April 27, 1935.

== Plot ==
Sam Preston is a small-town newspaper publisher who suffers from wanderlust. Leaving his family (wife Ellen, two daughters and a son,) he thinks well-provided for, he packs a suitcase and hits the road. Ten years later he comes back to find the newspaper shuttered and his family gone. He wanders from town to town searching for them and, finally, comes upon a little lost girl named Mary James, takes her to her home, and discovers she is his youngest daughter. Ellen is now running another newspaper, and is interested in politics...and another man. But after he pleads to remain with his children, she allows him to stay incognito as a housekeeper. Then, the town gossips go to work.

== Cast ==
- Aline MacMahon as Ellen Preston
- Guy Kibbee as Sam Preston
- Tom Brown as King Wagner
- Robert McWade as John Wagner
- Minor Watson as Kenneth Marvin
- Nan Grey as Lucille Preston
- John Arledge as Linc Overman
- Robert Light as Fred
- Betty Jean Hainey as Mary Jane Preston
- Oscar Apfel as Chief Bailey
- DeWitt Jennings as Sheriff
- Carl Stockdale as Gene
