= Marie Nordstrom =

American actress (c. 1881–1979)

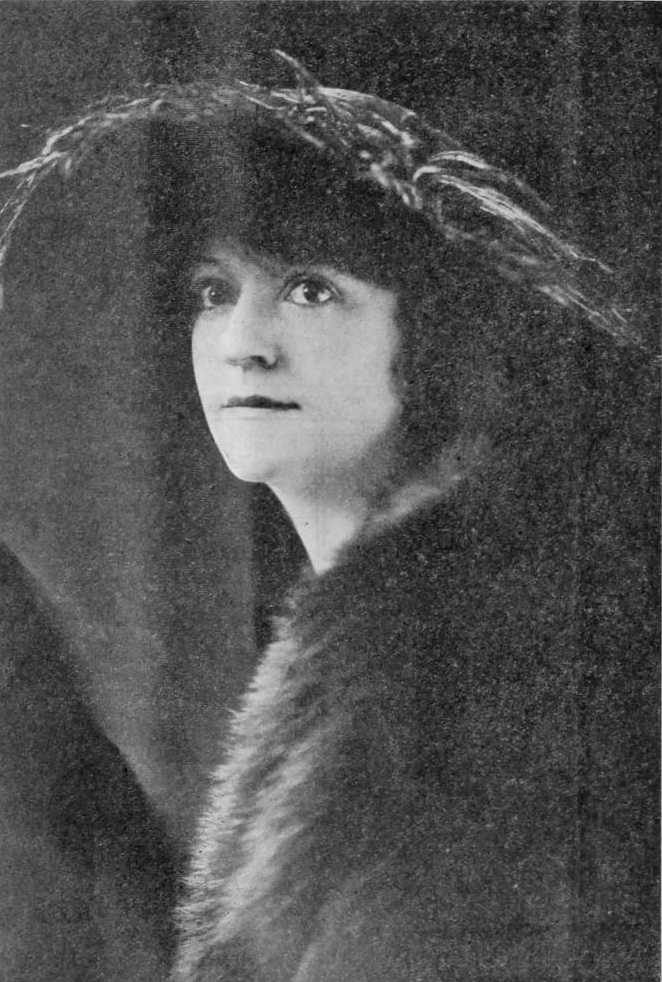
Marie Nordstrom

Marie Nordstrom (12 April 1881/1886 - 2 January 1979) was an American actress.

== Early years ==
Born in Fort Apache, Arizona Territory, Nordstrom was the daughter of United States Cavalry Captain Charles E. Nordstrom. She was also the older sister of actress, novelist, and playwright Frances Nordstrom. They moved with their mother to Washington, D.C., after their father's death. She was educated at Georgetown Convent in the District of Columbia and went on to study voice with Oscar Saenger.

Nordstrom became interested in the theater when, at about age 12, she and her sister attended a play in San Antonio, Texas. Frances told a reporter in 1908, "... our youthful minds were entranced, whereupon we each resolved that when we grew to womanhood we were going to be actresses." After they moved to Washington, both sisters attended more plays, which reinforced their interest in acting careers.

== Career ==
Nordstrom began her career in opera, appearing in productions that included La Tosca and Madame Butterfly, Henry E. Dixey, however, persuaded her to focus her efforts on acting rather than on singing. In 1904, she became the leading lady in the company headed by Dixey. Her introduction to Dixey came by accident when she accompanied her sister to an audition. Although the appointment had been made for Frances, Dixey was emphatic that Marie was the woman he wanted for the production of David Garrick. In 1908, she joined the Chicago Opera House troupe as its leading lady.

Nordstrom's Broadway credits include The Sap Runs High (1936), Mirrors (1928), Sweetheart Time (1926), Fashions of 1924 (1923), Lady Bug (1922), Bought and Paid For (1921), Girl o' Mine (1918), The Passing Show of 1917, The Charm of Isabel (1914), Bought and Paid For (1911), The Devil (1908), Papa Lebonnard (1908), The Man on the Box (1905), and Henry E. Dixey and Company (1904).

== Personal life ==
In May 1909, Nordstrom married Dixey in Milwaukee. The couple kept the wedding secret for a month, announcing it in New York in June 1909. She and Dixey had one daughter, children's publisher Ursula Nordstrom. In 1925, she married Elliott Brown in New York City. Brown manufactured marine machinery.
