= Alexander Gaden =

Canadian silent film actor

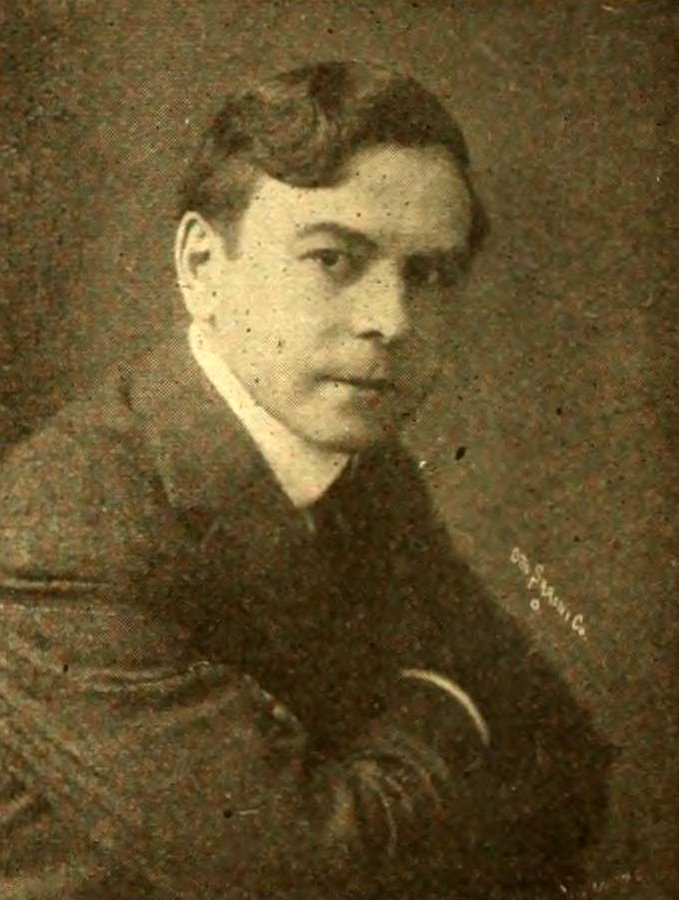
- Gaden in 1916
- Born: February 20, 1872
- Died: January 14, 1958 (aged 85)

Alexander Gaden (February 20, 1872, Newfoundland - January 14, 1958 Cook County, Chicago) was a silent film actor. He starred in 32 films between 1912 and 1923. He was often seen in early efforts by Adolph Zukor's fledgling Famous Players Film Company. He was often quoted as being born on February 20, 1880, in Montreal, Quebec. He is buried in Wunder's Cemetery at Chicago, Cook County, Illinois.

== Selected filmography ==
- Leah Kleschna (1913)
- The Daughter of the Hills (1913)
- A Lady of Quality (1913)
- An American Citizen (1914)
- The Capitol (1919)
- The Bandbox (1919)
- White Oak (1921)
