= February 1973 =

Month of 1973

<<	February 1973					>>
Su	Mo	Tu	We	Th	Fr	Sa
				1	2	3
4	5	6	7	8	9	10
11	12	13	14	15	16	17
18	19	20	21	22	23	24
25	26	27	28

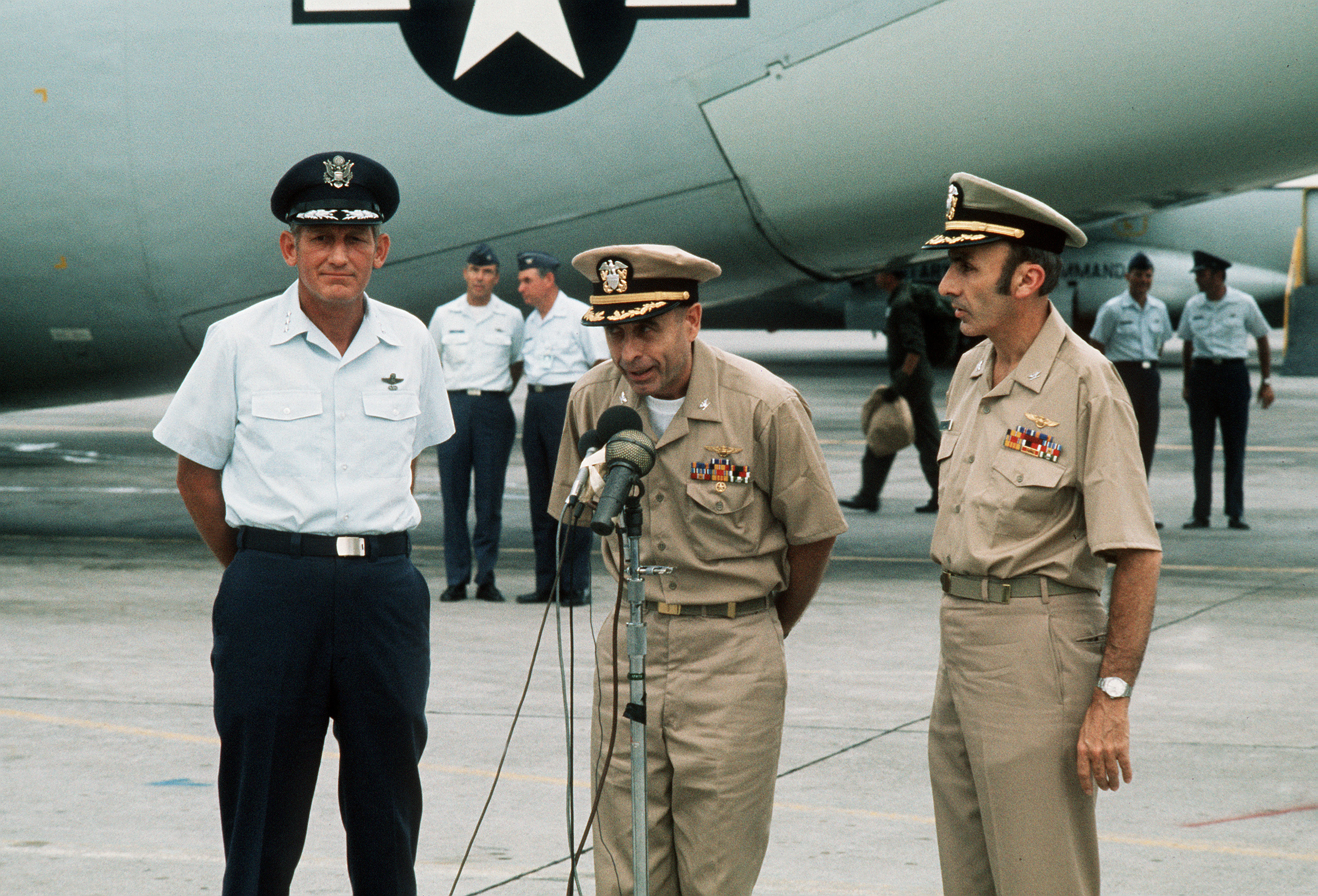
February 12, 1973: First repatriation of Vietnam prisoners of war begins (pictured, U.S. POWs Captain Jeremiah Denton and Captain James Mulligan, released after more than six years captivity)

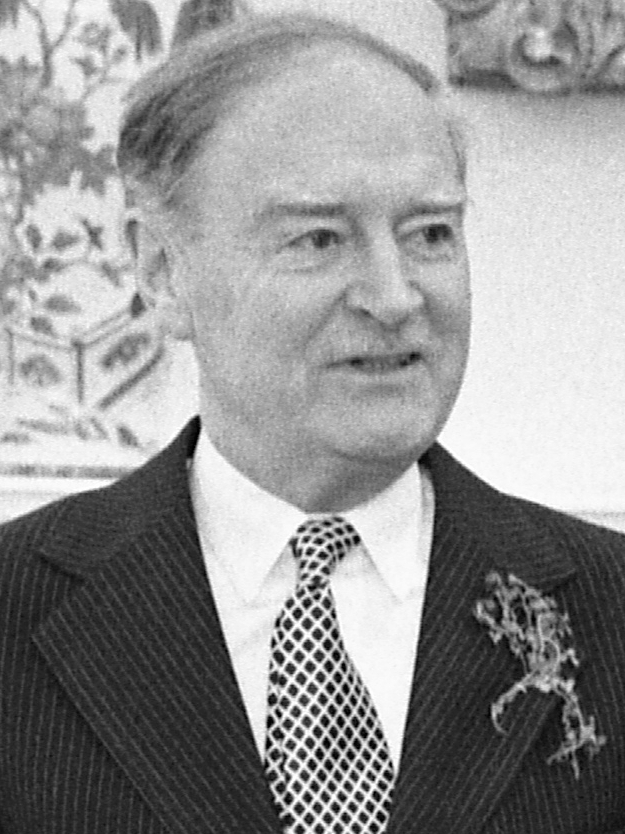
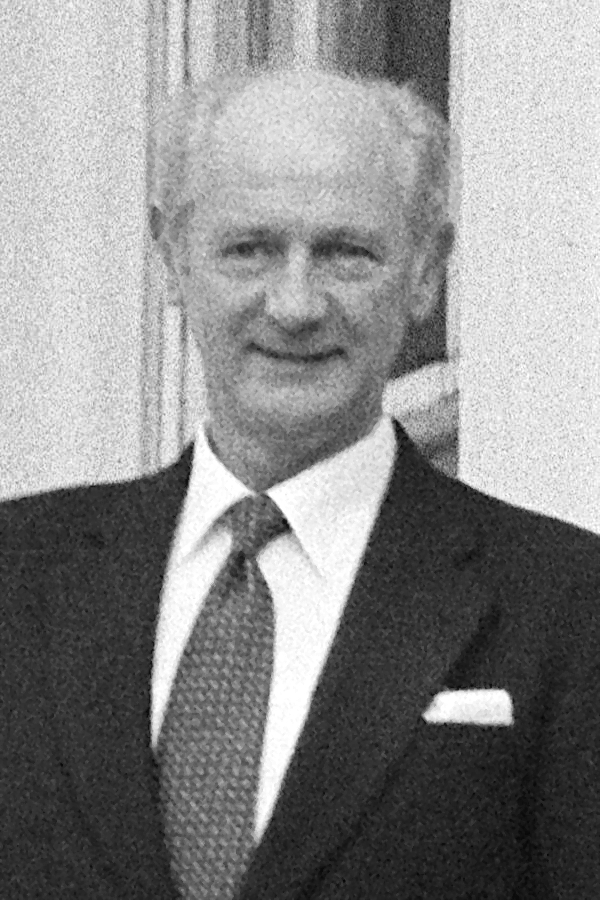
February 28, 1973: Liam Cosgrave leads upset over Jack Lynch's Fianna Fáil party in elections requested by Lynch

The following events occurred in February 1973:

== February 1, 1973 (Thursday) ==
- The "bantustan" of Venda, located in northeast South Africa near the border with Rhodesia, became the fifth of the "homelands" set for the white-ruled nation's black residents, with limited self-government. Plans for eventual separation as a nominally independent nation separate from South Africa would be made effective on September 13, 1979. Patrick Mphephu was named the Chief Minister of Venda.
- North Vietnam's government provided the names of only seven of the 319 Americans who had been listed by the U.S. as having been captured in Laos. There were 308 U.S. servicemen and four civilians who had been listed as missing in action or as prisoners of war.
- The United Kingdom's five Lords of Appeal in Ordinary, commonly called the "Law Lords" and serving as Britain's highest court, ruled 4 to 1 that private clubs in the UK could continue to refuse memberships on the grounds of race, reversing a decision by a lower court. The court ruling declared that the Race Relations Act 1968 did not apply to private clubs because the clubs did not provides goods or services to the general public, and that "a refusal to elect to membership on the ground of colour would not be unlawful."
- Jean Poiret's farce La Cage aux Folles, was premièred at the Théâtre du Palais-Royal in Paris.
- Metropolitan State University, established in St. Paul, Minnesota, as a night school college for working adults, had its first graduates, a class of 12 of the 50 students admitted in 1972.
- The United States First Fleet was inactivated by the U.S. Navy and its duties and equipment were transferred to the United States Third Fleet.
- The Ekin Airbuggy, a single-seat autogyro powered by a Volkswagen 75 horsepower engine, made its first flight. Although the "flying motorcycle" would not become operational, the Airbuggy would go on sale in December 1975.
- Joseph Lyles, 17, became the 28th victim of serial killer Dean Corll, whom he had befriended after being introduced by a 17-year-old neighbor, David Owen Brooks. The remains of Lyles, buried on a beach in Jefferson County, Texas, would not be located until more than 10 years later, and would not be identified until 2009.
- Born: Abu Saleh al-Afri, Iraqi terrorist who was the later the financier for the ISIS, the "Islamic State of Iraq and Syria" group; as Muwaffaq Mustafa Mohammed al-Karmoush in Iraq (killed in U.S. airstrike, 2015)

== February 2, 1973 (Friday) ==
- Three people were killed and 139 injured when a mentally-ill man walked into the Concord Cafeteria in Miami Beach, Florida, poured gasoline out of a large jar, and set it afire with a match.
- James R. Schlesinger became the new U.S. Director of Central Intelligence, succeeding Richard M. Helms, who resigned after almost seven years as DCI. At the same time, five new members of the presidential cabinet secretaries were sworn in— Elliot Richardson (Defense), Frederick B. Dent (Commerce), Peter J. Brennan (Labor), James T. Lynn (HUD) and Claude S. Brinegar (Transportation).
- Pope Paul VI created the offices of 30 new Roman Catholic cardinals from 17 nations, with seven from Italy. The addition increased the size of the College of Cardinals to 145.
- Thirteen people were killed in an explosion that leveled the Chatterbox Cafe and a neighboring Coast to Coast hardware store in Eagle Grove, Iowa.
- The Midnight Special, introduced by Wolfman Jack (Robert Weston Smith), began an 8-season run as the first U.S. network series to run at 1:00 in the morning, premiering on NBC. A pilot episode had been shown on August 19, 1972, and the series premiere was hosted by Helen Reddy, with Ike and Tina Turner as the opening act.
- President Richard Nixon sent his written State of the Union message to Congress rather than speaking to a joint session. For the first time since 1956, when Dwight D. Eisenhower was recovering from a heart attack, the President of the United States had the text printed rather than speaking on national television.
- Born: Latino (stage name for Roberto de Souza Rocha), Brazilian singer; in Rio de Janeiro
- Died: Margaret Lowenfeld, 82, British pioneer in child psychology

== February 3, 1973 (Saturday) ==
- Six people were shot to death and more wounded in two shootings by the Ulster Defense Association and by the British Army that happened within a few hours of each other in the predominantly-Catholic New Lodge neighborhood of Belfast in Northern Ireland. Three of the dead were Irish Republican Army members, while another three were civilians who happened to be in the group fired upon.
- "Crocodile Rock", a song about a dance that never actually existed, reached the top of the U.S. charts, giving Elton John his first U.S. number-one single.
- A Scottish Cup tie at Glebe Park, Brechin, gave the stadium its highest ever attendance, greater than the total population of the town of Brechin.
- Born: Ilana Sod, Mexican newscaster; in Mexico City

== February 4, 1973 (Sunday) ==
- The U.S. comic strip Hägar the Horrible, which would become popular worldwide, made its debut as a Sunday feature, with a daily version bowing in even more newspapers on Monday, February 5. Created by cartoonist Dik Browne, who also worked on Hi and Lois, the strip about a medieval viking and his family was introduced by King Features Syndicate.
- The first round of voting took place in the elections for the 18-member Conseil national in the principality of Monaco. The ruling Union Nationale et Démocratique (UND) won 16 seats, but for the first time since being created in 1962, did not control the entire parliament. The other two seats were won by Charles Soccal of the Democratic Union Movement for one of the 13 races decided in the first round), and Jean-Eugène Lorenzi the Monegasque Action party who won the runoff election against UND's Edmond Laforest de Minotty by 47 votes.
- An avalanche in Austria killed 10 members of a Bavarian skiing club, after sweeping down the side of Kirchspitze mountain in the Zillertal Alps near Innsbruck. The 36-member group was from Bad Aibling in West Germany and 24 were buried.
- The 1976 Winter Olympics were awarded by the International Olympic Committee (IOC) to the Austrian city of Innsbruck after the U.S. city of Denver had become the first Olympic site to turn down an award to host the Games. Innsbruck finished ahead of Lake Placid, New York in the U.S., Chamonix in France, and Tampere in Finland.
- Former Tunisian Finance Minister and Minister for Planning Ahmed Ben Salah, who had been jailed since 1970 after being convicted of treason, financial irregularities, falsification of statistics and "lack of trust in the head of state", was able to escape from prison in Tunis and fled to freedom in neighboring Algeria.
- The U.S. television news show 60 Minutes aired a segment, "The Selling of Colonel Herbert", which led to the CBS network being sued for libel by U.S. Army Lieutenant Colonel) Anthony Herbert. The lawsuit would lead to a landmark U.S. Supreme Court decision in 1979 in Herbert v. Lando, which rejected a claim of First Amendment protection against discovery requests of the editorial process. Herbert would end up losing his lawsuit in 1986.

== February 5, 1973 (Monday) ==
- The People's Republic of China and Japan agreed to reestablish diplomatic relations. By agreement between the two nations, Chen Chu, the Deputy Representative of China to the United Nations, was named ambassador to Tokyo and Heishiro Ogawa Japan's emissary to Tokyo.
- "Riding a wave of popularity," the Republic of Ireland's Prime Minister (Taoiseach) Jack Lynch asked President Éamon de Valera to dissolve Parliament and to order a national election for the 144-seat Dáil Éireann, to be held on February 28. Lynch had set as a goal the strengthening of his government's position in bargaining with the UK on the future of Northern Ireland. The move would backfire.
- The Army of the Kingdom of Laos halted Operation Maharat II against the Communist Pathet Lao guerrillas after five weeks.
- A U.S. Air Force spy plane was shot down over Laos one week after the Paris Peace Accords had officially ended the United States involvement in the Vietnam War. All eight crew of the EC-47 airplane were listed as killed, though the remains of only four crewmen would be located and their classification would later be changed to missing in action (MIA).
- In Fairfield, California, a trial judge sentenced serial killer Juan Corona to 25 life sentences, one for each of the 25 men whom he had been convicted of murdering. Superior Judge Richard Patton added that the life sentences would "be served consecutively and not concurrently." Corona had been convicted of the crimes on January 18. Despite the sentence, California Adult Authority ruled the next day that Corona would be eligible for parole after only seven years rather than 175 years (7 years for each of the 25 life sentences) and that the consecutive sentences would be merged to run concurrently. An official commented, "Corona can serve only one life." Corona would spend the rest of his life in prison, dying at age 85 in 2019.
- U.S. Army Colonel William B. Nolde, the last American serviceman to die in the Vietnam War, was buried with full honors at Arlington National Cemetery. Afterward, Nolde's widow and their five children met with U.S. President Nixon at the White House, where he told the children, "Your father gave his life so that you may live in a generation without war." Nolde had been killed ten hours before the January 28 ceasefire went into effect.
- The Australian version of The Price Is Right premiered on Network 10 (called, at the time, the 0-10 Network), five months after the re-imagined version by Mark Goodson and Bill Todman had made its debut in the U.S. The Australian version was initially hosted by Garry Meadows and produced by the Reg Grundy Organisation.
- The rock band Queen recorded the first four tracks of their album At the Beeb.
- The Portuguese volleyball team Castêlo da Maia Ginásio Clube, which would later win multiple men's and women's national championships, was founded.
- Born:
  - Trijntje Oosterhuis, popular Dutch singer; as Judith Katrijntje Oosterhuis in Amsterdam
  - Diego Serrano, Ecuadorian-born American soap opera actor; in Quito
- Died: Pete Morrison, 82, American film actor and star of numerous westerns, including the lead role of Santa Fe Peete.

== February 6, 1973 (Tuesday) ==
- At least 2,175 people died in Sichuan Province, China after a magnitude 7.6 earthquake struck near the town of Zhaggo.
- Operation End Sweep, the clearing of explosive mines from North Vietnam's Haiphong harbor, was commenced by four minesweepers of the United States Navy's Task Force 78 in accordance with the Paris Peace Accords. After 30 days, the U.S. Department of Defense announced that the minesweepers had "neither detonated nor recovered any of the several thousand mines" in North Vietnam's harbors.
- Two 14-year-old students set fire to the Edouard-Pailleron School in Paris, killing 16 children and four teachers.
- Seven children were killed near Fieldton, Texas, and 16 others and the bus driver were injured when the driver took the school bus into the path of an oncoming train while taking the students to school in Littlefield.
- In Toronto, construction of the CN Tower began with the financing of Canadian National, the nation's largest railway. The 1,815 feet (553 m) concrete communications and observation tower would be completed on April 2, 1975, and opened on June 26, 1976.

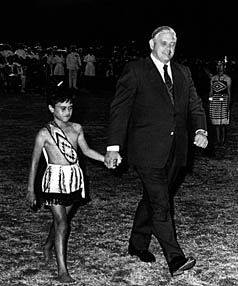
Kirk and a Maori friend at the '73 Waitangi Day celebration

- New Zealand's Prime Minister Norman Kirk symbolically reached out for a partnership with the nation's Māori people in a celebration of Waitangi Day, the New Zealand's independence day.
- Born:
  - Deng Yaping, Chinese table tennis player, winner of the men's singles world championship in 1991, 1995, and 1997, Olympic gold medalist in 1992 and 1996, and 1996 World Cup champion; in Zhengzhou, Henan province
  - Claudette Schreuders, South African sculptor; in Pretoria
- Died: Timacadde, 52, (pen name for Abdillahi Suldaan Mohammed), Somali poet laureate, from throat cancer

== February 7, 1973 (Wednesday) ==
- The United States Senate voted unanimously, 77–0, to approve U.S. Senate Resolution 60 and establish a select bipartisan committee to investigate the Watergate scandal.
- All but one of the 22-member crew of the Nisshin Maru No.8, a Japanese steel fishing vessel, died when the ship hit the Pedra Branca rock off Tasmania and sank within a few minutes. The lone survivor, engineer Yoshiichi Meguro, manages to clamber onto the rocks. He was rescued by a fishing vessel.
- Eleven people were killed in the crash of a U.S. Navy jet into the Tahoe Apartments in Alameda, California, including the pilot, and 40 were injured. The explosion and fire at 8:26 in the evening destroyed two four-story apartment buildings at 1825 Central Avenue, where about 200 tenants, mostly young couples, lived. The A-7E Corsair II jet caught fire at an altitude of 28,000 feet (8,500 m) while flying over San Francisco Bay during a training flight after taking off from Lemoore Naval Air Station.
- Poisonous fumes from an underground mine fire killed 26 miners at the East Driefontein Gold Mining Company in South Africa. The victims were all black workers from the neighboring nation of Malawi.
- The West German news magazine Stern exposed the identity of "M", the director of the British spy agency MI-6, as Sir John Ogilvy Rennie.
- In the UK, the RTV31 Tracked Hovercraft high-speed train was successfully tested for the first time. The project was canceled a week later.
- The Politburo of the Communist Party of the Soviet Union approved a recommendation by KGB Director Yuri Andropov to allocate $100,000 in U.S. currency to influence the March 4 parliamentary elections in Chile.
- The Oshima Shipbuilding company was founded in Nagasaki, Japan.
- A heat wave affected large parts of New Zealand, with several places in Canterbury and Marlborough recording temperatures over 40 °C (104 °F). Rangiora set a new national record, reaching 42.4 °C (108.3 °F) for the hottest day in the nation's history.
- Born: Angel Aquino, Philippine TV actress; in Laoang, Northern Samar
- Died: Nikola Martinoski, 69, Yugoslav Macedonian painter

== February 8, 1973 (Thursday) ==
- The Church of Denmark (officially the Evangelical-Lutheran Church in Denmark) became the first Christian body to recognize gay marriage, when Pastor Harald Søbye performed a wedding of two men. Søbye followed on February 25 with the televised wedding of a lesbian couple. Neither marriage was given legal recognition by the Kingdom of Denmark.
- U.S. Senator Sam Ervin of South Carolina was named Chairman of the Senate Watergate Committee, a bipartisan committee to investigate the Watergate scandal.
- The comet 64P/Swift–Gehrels was rediscovered after having last been seen by astronomers in 1889, when observed by Tom Gehrels from the Palomar Observatory in California.
- Born: Francisco "Paco" Plaza, Spanish filmmaker known for the REC horror film series; in Valencia
- Died:
  - Herbie Taylor, 83, South African cricketer
  - Robert M. Coates, 75, American novelist

== February 9, 1973 (Friday) ==
- The United Kingdom and France established diplomatic relations with East Germany, leaving the U.S. as the only nation to refuse to give the Communist nation recognition.
- The first convention of the National Women's Political Caucus began in Houston, ending on February 11. The co-founders of the NWPC— Betty Friedan, Gloria Steinem and U.S. representatives Bella Abzug and Shirley Chisholm— stepped aside and asked the 1,000 delegates to elect new leaders of the organization. Chisholm said, "We don't need any more of the superstar syndrome. I am sure that Betty, Gloria and Bella are as sick of seeing their faces as I am of seeing mine," while Steinem told the audience, "We beg you to take over. We must at last make the structure go from the bottom up, rather than the top down. The next day, the delegates voted 264 4/5 to 264 1/5 to admit men to the NWPC on a non-voting basis, with local and state caucuses to decide whether to extend voting rights.
- In Pakistan, government agents raided Iraq's embassy in Islamabad, bypassing diplomatic immunity. The move came after the Intelligence Bureau (IB) intercepted communications that showed that Iraq was supplying weapons and funding to militants waging war against the Pakistan Army in the Balochistan province.
- Soviet Russian serial killer Anatoly Utkin was apprehended by police in Ulyanovsk after killing the cashier of a textiles factory in a robbery attempt, then setting fire to the building but leaving behind a bucket with his name stamped on it. Utkin would be convicted of having committed nine murders between 1968 and 1973, and executed on September 12, 1975.
- In Westchester, California, a suburb of Los Angeles, the merger of the all-male Loyola University and the all-women Marymount College was announced by both institutions, with Loyola Marymount University to come into existence on July 1, 1973.
- Born: Svetlana Boginskaya, Belarusian gymnast; in Minsk, Byelorussian SSR, Soviet Union
- Died: Max Yasgur, 53, American dairy farmer who allowed his upstate New York farm to be the site of the Woodstock Festival, died of a heart attack.

== February 10, 1973 (Saturday) ==
- An explosion and fire killed 40 workers employed at Texas Eastern Transmission Company (TETCo), when a natural gas storage tank blew up in the Bloomfield neighborhood of New York City's Staten Island. There were 42 persons inside the structure, cleaning the tank that had been listed as completely drained of flammable fuels, but ignition occurred, and only two people near the top of the tank were able to escape outside. The rest were killed by either the blast, or by being crushed to death when the force raised the concrete cap at least 20 feet (6.1 m) in the air and then came crashing back down.
- Casino gambling became legal in Australia with the opening of the Wrest Point Hotel Casino in Sandy Bay, Tasmania, a suburb of Hobart.
- In Uganda, thousands of spectators watched the public execution of persons convicted of guerrilla activities. The shootings, by firing squad, of the 12 convicts were spread across seven cities and towns.
- ABBA, entered as "Björn and Benny, Agnetha and Anni-Frid" performed the song "Ring Ring" in Melodifestivalen 1973, the contest to select the Swedish entry for the forthcoming Eurovision Song Contest, but finished in third place behind second place Ann-Kristin Hedmark and the winner, the pop duo Malta (band). The third place finishers would create the name from their band a year later, taking the initial letters of their first names (B & B, A & A) and rearranging them, going on to win the 1974 Eurovision contest and becoming successful worldwide.
- Born: Martha Lane Fox, English public servant and businesswoman; in Oxford, the daughter of Robin Lane Fox

== February 11, 1973 (Sunday) ==
- Liechtenstein held a referendum on whether to allow women the right to vote. Only men were allowed to participate in the vote in the tiny European principality. Only 1,675 (44%) of the 3,856 voting men were in favor, while 2,126 (56%) were against. The result was a setback from the February 28, 1971 vote when suffrage failed by only 81 votes. Liechtenstein's men would not approve women's suffrage until a 1984 referendum.
- The Protocol on Trade Negotiations, a preferential trade agreement among mostly Third World nations and signed on December 9, 1971, entered into force.
- Voting was held in Haiti for the 58 seats of the Chambre des Députés. Over 300 candidates, all of whom were members of the Parti de l'unité nationale and approved by Haitian dictator Jean-Claude Duvalier, and the 58 receiving the highest number of votes were declared the winners.
- General Alfredo Stroessner, President of Paraguay since a 1954 coup d'état, won re-election for the fourth time, getting almost 85% of the vote over rival candidates Gustavo Riart and Carlos Levi Rufinelli. His ruling Colorado Party captured 20 of the 30 seats in the Senate and 40 of the 60 seats in the Chamber of Deputies.
- Emerson Fittipaldi won the 1973 Brazilian Grand Prix at the Interlagos Circuit near São Paulo.
- Born:
  - Jeon Do-yeon, South Korean film actress; in Seoul
  - Mishal Husain, British news anchor (presenter) for BBC Weekend News; in Northampton, Northamptonshire
  - Mouss Maher (stage name for Mahraoui El Mustapha), Moroccan singer of Raï music; in Ahfir
- Died:
  - Hans Jensen, 65, German nuclear physicist and co-recipient (with Maria Goeppert-Mayer) of the 1963 Nobel Prize in Physics
  - Ivan Khokhlov, 77, Soviet Russian politician who had been the Council of People's Commissars of the Russian SFSR from 1940 to 1943, and later served as Chief Inspector for the Soviet Ministry of Trade
  - David Whiting, 26, former correspondent for Time magazine, was found dead in the hotel room of actress Sarah Miles after fighting with Miles and Burt Reynolds, her co-star in The Man Who Loved Cat Dancing.
  - David Lawrence, 84, U.S. publisher who founded the news magazine U.S. News & World Report

== February 12, 1973 (Monday) ==
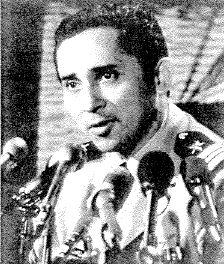
Lt. Commander Alvarez, released after more than eight years as a POW

- Operation Homecoming, the release of prisoners of war (POWs) in the Vietnam War, began as three U.S. Air Force C-141 medical transports landed at the Gia Lam Airport in Hanoi in North Vietnam to pick up American POWs. The Viet Cong released another 27 American military and civilian prisoners who had been held captive in "jungle prisons" in VC-controlled areas of South Vietnam. At the same time, a North Vietnamese Air Force C-9A transport was allowed to land in Saigon in South Vietnam, to pick up North Vietnamese and Viet Cong prisoners. The three aircraft brought 116 POWs to Clark Air Force Base in the Philippines on the first day of the operation. U.S. Navy Captain Jeremiah Denton was appointed by his fellow prisoners to be the first of 41 prisoners to step off of the first C-141 to land, followed by U.S. Navy Lt. Commander Everett Alvarez Jr., who had been the first American POW captured in North Vietnam, and who had been incarcerated since August 5, 1964. From February 12 to April 4, there were 54 C-141 missions flying out of Hanoi, bringing 591 released prisoners of war back to the U.S.
- Ohio became the first U.S. state to use the metric system, with an experiment to post distances on road signs on Interstate 71 in both miles and kilometers.
- Uruguay's President Juan María Bordaberry, elected in 1972 as a civilian candidate, turned authority over to the commanders of the South American nation's Army and Air Force under the rule of the Consejo de Seguridad Nacional, for which he was the nominal chairman.
- The United States dollar was devalued by 10%, marking the second time in 14 months that the official worth of the dollar, in relation to other major currencies of the world, was reduced. Specifically, U.S. President Nixon asked Congress to approve the official price of an ounce of gold from $38.00 to $42.22 (or changing the value of US$100 from 2.63 ounces of gold to 2.36 ounces of gold). On December 18, 1971, the worth of the dollar had been devalued by 8.57 percent.
- Born:
  - Saulos Chilima, Vice President of the Republic of Malawi since 2020; in Blantyre
  - Tara Strong, Canadian-American voice actress known for The Powerpuff Girls and The Fairly OddParents; in Toronto
  - Roxana Castellanos, Mexican TV actress and singer; in Monterrey, Nuevo León
- Died: Benjamin Frankel, 67, British composer

== February 13, 1973 (Tuesday) ==
- Pakistan's Prime Minister Zulfiqar Ali Bhutto dismissed the government of the province of Balochistan.
- Australia and Indonesia signed a treaty confirming the division of jurisdiction over the island of New Guinea in half, primarily along the 141st meridian east (141° E), with the exception of a portion along the Fly River. The eastern half is now the independent nation of Papua New Guinea, while the western half of the island is now the Indonesian provinces of Papua, Papua Pegunungan, Papua Selatan, all on the border, and Papua Barat and Papua Tengah.
- U.S. Navy Commander Brian D. Woods and U.S. Air Force Major Glendon W. Perkins became the first released Vietnam POWs to set foot in the United States, arriving at Miramar Naval Air Station near San Diego. Both men were rushed home early because of the illness of their mothers.
- Serial killer Herbert Mullin was arrested in Santa Cruz, California, shortly after killing the last of 13 victims whom he had murdered over a period of four months. Two days later, Mullin was charged with the murder of Fred Perez, as well as five people whom he had killed on January 25, based on testing of two weapons found in his car and in his home.
- Born: Conrad Humphreys, English professional yachtsman, television personality and conservationist; in Exeter, Devonshire
- Died: Rosa Torre González, 82, Mexican politician and the first Mexican woman to be elected to office. She was elected to the City Council of Mérida in 1922 after Yucatán became the first Mexican state to allow women the right to vote and hold public office.

== February 14, 1973 (Wednesday) ==
- The United Nations announced in its report on 1970 world population that the Chinese city of Shanghai, with 10,820,000 residents, was the largest in the world, displacing Japan's capital of Tokyo, which had been at the top of the list with 8,840,942 residents. New York City remained at third place with 7,894,862 in its city limits. The list had London (7,379,014 in 1971) and Moscow (7,050,000) in the top five.
- The Farmers' Organization Authority was founded in Malaysia.
- Born: Steve McNair, American football quarterback, 2003 NFL Most Valuable Player, inductee to the College Football Hall of Fame; in Mount Olive, Mississippi (died 2009)
- Died:
  - Ida Schnall, 83, American female athlete and film actress who was captain of the New York Female Giants touring professional baseball team in 1913
  - Émile Reuter, 98, prime minister of Luxembourg 1918 to 1925

== February 15, 1973 (Thursday) ==
- The United States and Cuba signed an agreement to prevent the further hijacking of U.S. airplanes to Cuba, in simultaneous ceremonies in Washington and in Havana. Under the agreement, Cuba agreed to extradite hijackers back to the U.S., while the U.S. agreed that a Cuban who escaped to the U.S. without endangering people on a ship or a plane would be prosecuted for illegal entry, though not returned to Cuba. Cuban hijackers who did endanger people in the course of an escape to the U.S. would be returned to Cuba.
- The first group of American prisoners of war freed from North Vietnam arrived in the United States, landing at Kelly Air Force Base at San Antonio, Texas, where crowds were limited to the freed POWs' families.
- The German think tank organization for urban development, das Deutsches Institut für Urbanistik, was founded in West Berlin
- Born:
  - Amy Van Dyken, American swimmer, 1996 and 2000 Olympic gold medalist and 1998 world champion; in Englewood, Colorado
  - Anna Dogonadze, Georgian-born German trampoline gymnast and 2004 Olympic gold medalist; in Mtskheta, Georgian SSR, Soviet Union
  - Carlos Jean Arriaga, Spanish record producer of Spanish and Latin-American artists; in Ferrol, La Coruña

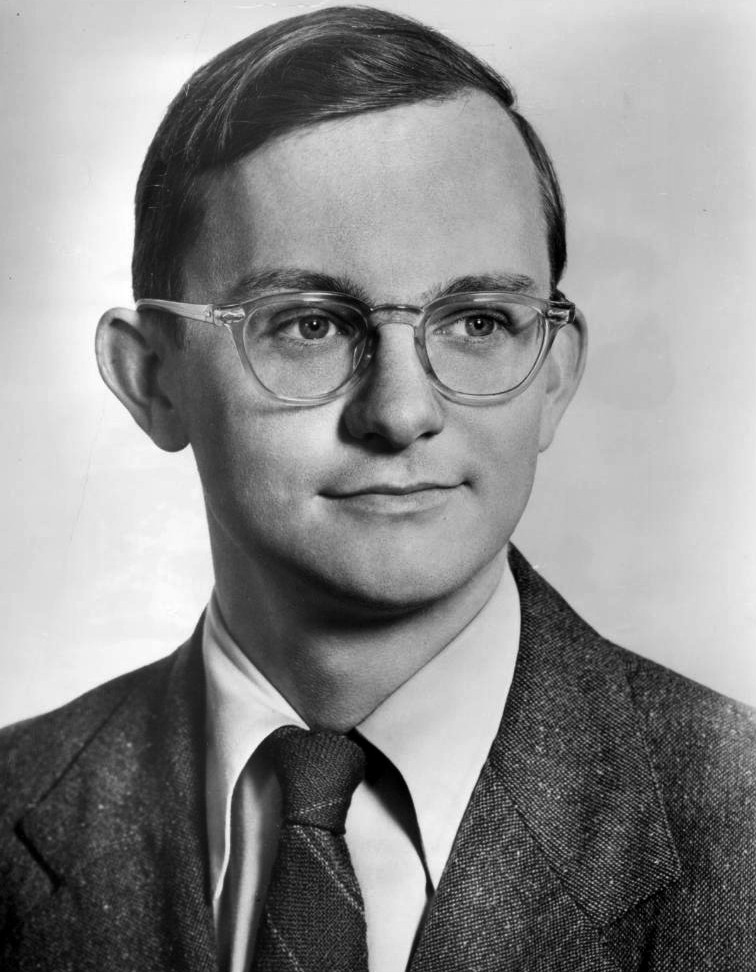
Wally Cox

- Died:
  - Wally Cox, 48, American comedian and character actor who portrayed kind-hearted but meek persons on television; known for the title role of NBC's Mister Peepers and as the voice of the title character in the TV cartoon Underdog. Cox was found dead at his home in Hollywood, from a heart attack caused by coronary occlusion.
  - Tim Holt, 54, American film actor known for The Treasure of the Sierra Madre and The Magnificent Ambersons B-movie Westerns for RKO, died of bone cancer
  - Valdemars Ozolins, 76, Latvian classical music composer

== February 16, 1973 (Friday) ==
- The Heritage Foundation, a U.S. conservative think tank whose study Mandate for Leadership would be a blueprint for the presidency of Ronald Reagan and a rightward-shift for U.S. politics, was founded by Paul Weyrich, Edwin Feulner, and Joseph Coors.
- Died: Francisco Caamaño Deno, former Dominican Republic Army colonel and guerrilla leader who had formerly been one of the leaders of the April 1965 overthrow of President Donald Reid, was killed in a clash with government forces in the mountains near San José de Ocoa.

== February 17, 1973 (Saturday) ==
- The International Convention for the Prevention of Pollution From Ships was signed. It would come into effect after being modified in 1978, and is generally referred to as MARPOL (for the internationally recognized words "marine" and "pollution") 73/78.
- The 1973 OFC Nations Cup, the first soccer football tournament for the Oceana nations in the South Pacific Ocean, opened in New Zealand. On February 24, the New Zealand national team defeated Tahiti, 2 to 0, at Auckland, to win the championship.
- Born: Raphaël Ibañez, French rugby union player; in Saugnac-et-Cambran, Landes département
- Died:
  - Francesco Jacomoni, 79, Italian minister ambassador to Albania who helped planned Italy's invasion and takeover of the Balkan kingdom and then ruled harshly as Governor-General of the Italian protectorate of Albania from 1939 to 1943.
  - Lynn Hoyem, 33, former NFL offensive lineman, was killed in a private plane crash.
  - Suzanne Balguerie, 84, French opera soprano

== February 18, 1973 (Sunday) ==
- The Galápagos Islands were declared to be a 20th province of Ecuador by decree of President Guillermo Rodríguez Lara.
- Grave robbers stole the body of French Army Marshal Philippe Pétain, a World War One hero who turned traitor in World War Two to command the government of Vichy France, the German Nazi occupied puppet state. Petain had been buried in a tomb on the island of Île d'Yeu since his death in 1951. Petain's coffin was found on February 21 in Paris and five men were arrested for the theft, including François Boux de Casson, who had been Petain's minister of information, and Hubert Massol, who took credit for the operation, with the goal of having Pétain reburied at the war cemetery in Verdun.
- The King Biscuit Flower Hour, a syndicated Sunday night radio program sponsored by the King Biscuit Flour Company and featuring rock band performances, premiered and would last until 2005.
- The scheduled election for Cyprus did not take place because the candidates were unopposed. On February 8, the deadline for filing expired at noon with no candidate running against the incumbent president, Archbishop Makarios III (Michael Christodoulou Mouskos), a Greek Cypriot, and he was re-elected by default. Rauf Denktaş, a Turkish Cypriot, was unopposed and became the new vice president.
- Died:
  - Frank Costello, 82, Italian-born U.S. mobster who had been boss of the Luciano crime family and retired in 1957 after surviving an assassination attempt
  - Charles Stewart Mott, 97, American industrialist and co-founder of General Motors
  - Fred Niblo Jr., 70, Academy Award-winning film screen writer
  - Larry Thompson, 61, American humorist, died of emphysema.

== February 19, 1973 (Monday) ==
- The crash of Aeroflot Flight 141 and a subsequent fire killed 62 passengers and four crew out of the 100 people on board. The Tupolev Tu-154 was approaching Prague at the end of a flight from Moscow, and crashed one mile (1.5 km) short of the runway. Of the 34 survivors, 18 were seriously injured.
- The Manned Space Center in Houston, which coordinated all U.S. manned space missions, was renamed the Johnson Space Center (JSC) as U.S. President Nixon signed a Senate resolution into law. The change of name came four weeks after the death of U.S. President Lyndon B. Johnson, who had lobbied for creation of the NASA while leader of the U.S. Senate.

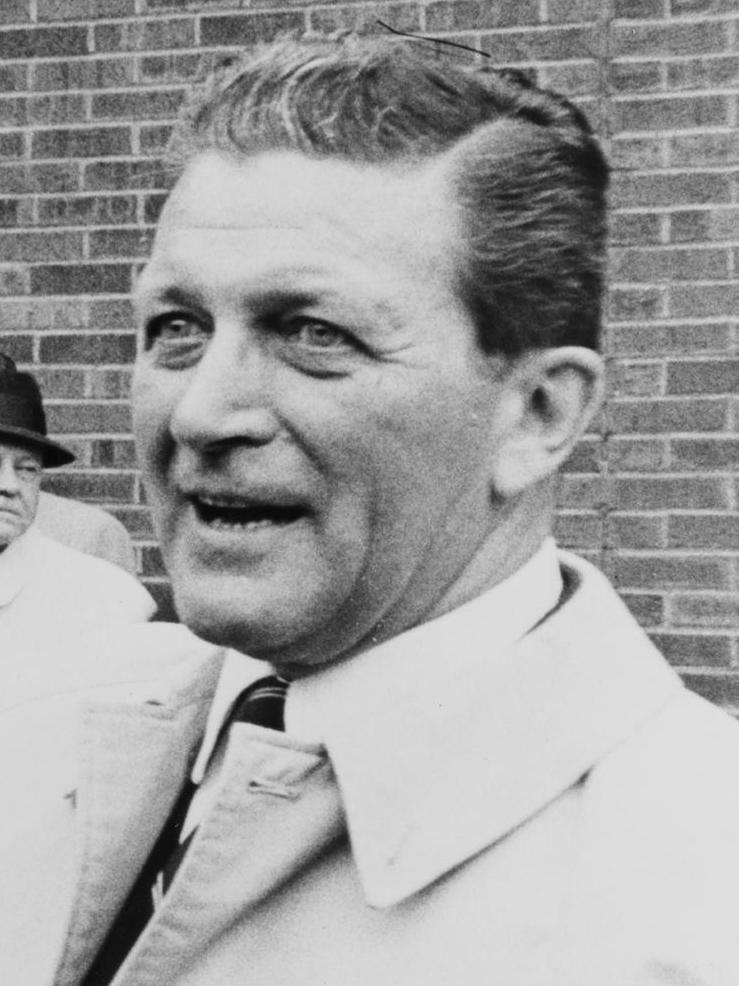
Federal judge and federal convict Kerner

- The Israeli commando squads Shayetet 13, along with Unit 707 and Sayeret Tzanhanim carried out a joint raid that killed 40 Palestinian terrorists and wounded 60 in two locations in Lebanon.
- Otto Kerner Jr. became the first United States federal judge to be convicted of a crime, after having been indicted for conspiracy to commit bribery, perjury, federal income tax evasion and mail fraud. Kerner had committed the acts while serving as Governor of Illinois between 1961 and 1968, and had also chaired the Kerner Commission that investigated rioting in the United States.
- "Tie a Yellow Ribbon Round the Ole Oak Tree", which would become the best-selling recording in the U.S. and the UK for 1973, was released by the group Tony Orlando and Dawn.
- Died: Joseph Szigeti, 80, Hungarian violinist

== February 20, 1973 (Tuesday) ==
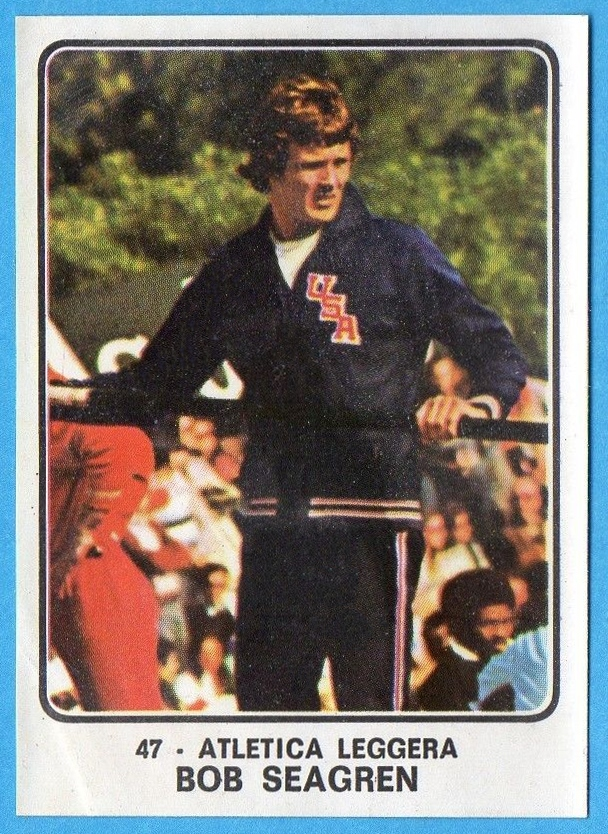
Seagren

- The first Superstars competition, a made-for-TV program produced for broadcast on the ABC network on February 25, was won by pole-vaulter Bob Seagren after two days of competition in Rotonda West, Florida, who finished in first place and won $39,700 (equivalent to $265,000 fifty years later). The show was conceived by TV producer and former Olympic champion figure skater Dick Button and followed a format of having 10 events, and 10 well-known athletes competing in nine events outside their specialty. Seagren finished in first place in weightlifting, baseball-hitting, a half-mile run and a one-mile bike race, while skier Jean-Claude Killy came in second with $23,400. Other athletes were race car driver Peter Revson, Rod Laver of tennis, baseball's Johnny Bench, basketball's Elvin Hayes, hockey's Rod Gilbert, bowler Jim Stefanich, football's Johnny Unitas and boxer Joe Frazier.
- Journalist Peter Niesewand was arrested in Salisbury in Rhodesia (now Harare, Zimbabwe) after criticizing the government of Prime Minister Ian Smith. After 73 days in solitary confinement, he was released and deported to the United Kingdom.
- Two Pakistanis were shot dead by police in London after being found inside the Indian High Commission carrying pistols. The guns were later established to have been fake.
- Born: Claudiu Târziu, Romanian right-wing politician; in Bacău
- Died:
  - Maurice Dallimore, 60, English character actor, from cirrhosis
  - G.H.E. Hopkins, 74, English entomologist for whom the genus of flea Hopkinsipsylla is named

== February 21, 1973 (Wednesday) ==
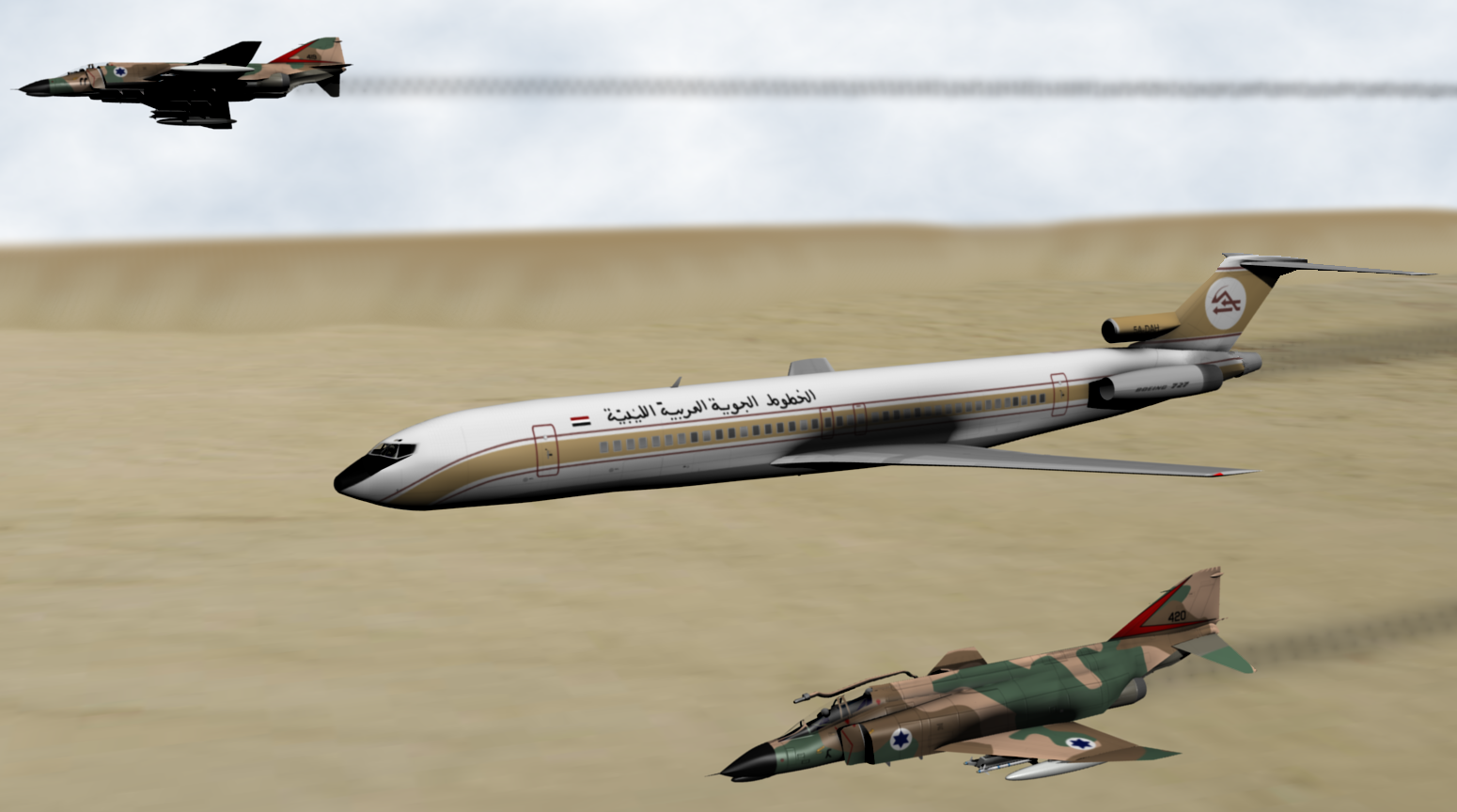
Artist's Rendition of Libyan Arab Airlines Flight 114

- All but five of the 113 people aboard Libyan Arab Airlines Flight 114 were killed when the Boeing 727 was shot down by Israeli fighter aircraft after straying over the Sinai Desert during its flight from Benghazi in Libya to Cairo in Egypt. The flight had been cleared for a landing in Cairo but, because of a sandstorm, was off course and descended toward the Suez Canal in the Israeli-occupied Egyptian peninsula. The pilots of the two intercepting F-4 Phantom II fighters shot bursts of 20mm gunfire and damaged the airliner's controls. The only survivors were four of the 104 passengers, and Flight 114's co-pilot.
- The Vientiane Treaty was signed between the government of the Kingdom of Laos and the communist Pathet Lao, bringing a cease-fire in the Laotian Civil War effective at noon on February 22, in return for the creation of a new coalition government and joint patrol of the cities of Laos. The Pathet Lao would take over control of Laos in 1975, bringing an end to the coalition government, the monarchy, and the treaty.
- An estimated 3,000 students barricaded themselves inside the buildings of the law school of the University of Athens, demanding repeal of a law that imposed forcible conscription.
- Died:
  - Swami Rudrananda, 45, American Buddhist spiritual teacher who was born into a Jewish family as Albert Rudolph, died in the crash of a small plane in New York's Catskill Mountains.
  - Salah Busir, 47, Libya's Minister of Information since 1970, and its Foreign Minister from 1969 to 1970, was killed in the crash of Libyan Airlines Flight 114.

== February 22, 1973 (Thursday) ==
- Following President Richard Nixon's visit to mainland China, the United States and the People's Republic of China agreed to establish liaison offices. David K. E. Bruce, described by a colleague as "so exquisitely polite his manners are almost Chinese" would become the first U.S. liaison to Beijing on May 14 of that year. Huang Zhen, the Chinese ambassador to France, was named as the liaison to Washington and would take office on May 30.
- The ceasefire in the Laotian Civil War took effect at noon (0500 UTC) in Laos but was violated within five minutes, principally around the city of Pakse. Five minutes after the hostilities ceased, Pathet Lao artillery began shelling the town of Paksong, killing five Laotian troops and wounding 27, and at 12:30, a North Vietnamese patrol fought with the Laotian Army at Kongsebone. At the Laotian government's request, U.S. planes then resumed bombing of Communist troops.
- The Netherlands counter terrorism unit M-Squadron was created as part of the Netherlands Maritime Special Operations Forces of the Netherlands Marine Corps.
- The U.S. states of Michigan and Ohio ended a 135-year-old boundary dispute regarding possession of Turtle Island, an uninhabited 1.5 acres (0.61 ha) islet in Lake Erie, by signing an agreement dividing the island in half.
- Born:
  - Édouard Ngirente, Prime Minister of Rwanda since 2017; in Gakenke
  - Philippe Gaumont, French cyclist who wrote about his use of performance enhancing drugs in a post-retirement book Prisonnier du dopage; in Amiens, Somme département (died of heart attack, 2013)
- Died:
  - Katina Paxinou, 72, Greek stage and film actress, winner of the 1943 Academy Award for Best Supporting Actress for her role in For Whom the Bell Tolls
  - Elizabeth Bowen, 73, Irish novelist
  - Jean-Jacques Bertrand, 56, Premier of the Canadian province of Quebec from 1968 to 1970
  - Winthrop Rockefeller, 60, Governor of the U.S. state of Arkansas from 1967 to 1971, died of pancreatic cancer.
  - Brigitte Reimann, 39, East German novelist and dissident, died of cancer

== February 23, 1973 (Friday) ==
- Marien Ngouabi, dictator of the Republic of the Congo, announced from Brazzaville that 30 high-ranking officials, including his information minister Sylvain Bemba and former Prime Minister Pascal Lissouba, had been arrested on charges of plotting a coup d'état that had been timed for the first anniversary of the February 22, 1972 coup attempt by Ange Diawara. Lissouba would be acquitted, and Bemba (who admitted complicity in a coup) was given a suspended sentence. Other members, convicted of being members of the group M 22 (Mouvement 22 de fevrier) would be executed at the national stadium in Brazzaville and their bodies would be put on display. Diawara would be found and killed in April.
- Four officials of the Trinidad and Tobago terrorist group National Union of Freedom Fighters (NUFF), including leader John Beddoe, were killed by police in a shootout at the town of Laventille, where the group was traced after an armed robbery of the Barclays Bank in Port of Spain earlier in the day.
- The United States of America and the People's Republic of China announced jointly that they would establish liaison offices in each other's capitals, with offices opening in Washington DC and in Beijing. The agreement came after a five day visit to China by National Security Adviser Henry Kissinger.
- Born: Munzir Al-Musawa, Indonesian Muslim cleric, educator, and founder of the Majelis Rasulullah; in Cipanas, Cianjur Regency, West Java (d. 2013)

== February 24, 1973 (Saturday) ==
- All 79 people aboard Aeroflot Flight 630 were killed when the Ilyushin Il-18 turboprop airliner broke apart at altitude of 7,200 feet (2,200 m) while on a flight within the Tadzhik SSR of the Soviet Union (now Tajikistan) from Dushanbe to Leninabad (now Khujand), where it was stopping for continuing to a final scheduled destination of Moscow.
- Died:
  - Eugen Rosenstock-Huessy, 84, German-born American historian
  - Carl Williams, 32, American racing driver who competed in 63 USAC races (including five consecutive Indianapolis 500 races), was killed in a motorcycle accident in Kansas City, Missouri.

== February 25, 1973 (Sunday) ==
- A Little Night Music, a musical with music and lyrics by Stephen Sondheim, premiered on Broadway and would run for 601 performances, winning the 1973 Tony Award for Best Musical.
- The comic strip Terry and the Pirates ended its run of more than 38 years after having been launched on October 22, 1934, by Milton Caniff and then continued by George Wunder. The Chicago Tribune-New York News Syndicate announced on February 14 that the strip was being dropped because Wunder had announced his retirement.
- Elections were held in Gabon for the presidency and National Assembly. The Gabonese Democratic Party, the only legal political party in the African nation, offered a list of 70 candidates for the 70 seats. Albert-Bernard Bongo, who had been President of Gabon since 1967, ran for re-election without opposition. All of the candidates won.
- Born:
  - Gautham Vasudev Menon, Indian film producer and director in the Tamil language film industry; in Ottapalam, Kerala state
  - Hélène de Fougerolles, French film actress; in Vannes, Morbihan departément
  - Julio Iglesias Jr., Spanish singer; to Julio Iglesias and Isabel Preysler, in Madrid
- Died: Dimitar Peshev, 78, Bulgarian politician

== February 26, 1973 (Monday) ==
- The month after the end of the Vietnam War, Australia established diplomatic relations with North Vietnam. On July 28, the Australian Embassy would be opened in Hanoi with Bruce Woodberry as the charge d'affaires.
- The Chessie System was incorporated through the merger of three American railroad lines, the Chesapeake and Ohio Railway (C & O), the Baltimore and Ohio Railroad (B & O), the Western Maryland Railway (WM), and the Baltimore and Ohio Chicago Terminal Railroad (B&OCT), with acquisition finalized on June 15, 1973.
- Died:
  - Badridas Goenka, 89, Indian industrialist who served as Chairman of the Imperial Bank of India from 1933 to 1955, and as the first Chairman of the State Bank of India
  - Mark L. Prophet, 54, American New Age religion leader who founded The Summit Lighthouse, died of a stroke. He was succeeded in the operation of the organization by his wife, Elizabeth Clare Prophet who would build the Summit movement into the Church Universal and Triumphant.

== February 27, 1973 (Tuesday) ==
- Voting was held in South Korea for 146 of the 219 seats in the Daehanminguk Gukhoe. President Park Chung-hee selected the people to fill the other 73 seats, and his choices were ratified on March 7 by delegates of the National Conference for Unification. Park's Democratic Republican party won 73 of the elected seats, while the opposition New Democratic Party, led by Yu Chin-san, won 52.
- The first nationwide strike of civil servants in the history of the United Kingdom began after midnight as 280,000 government employees went on a one-day strike and walked off the job. The first to leave were customs officials at British docks and airports.
- North Vietnam and the Viet Cong announced that there would be no further release of American prisoners of war and charged that the U.S. had acted in bad faith on the peace agreement by moving slowly on its withdrawal of remaining troops from Vietnam.
- The 28th Australian Parliament opened with the Australian Labor Party having taken majority control in the House of Representatives from the Liberal-Country coalition in the December 2 election. Jim Cope (ALP-N.S.W.) was elected as the Speaker of the Australian House of Representatives to succeed William Aston, the former Speaker from the Coalition, who had lost his seat in the House.
- The Mayall 4-meter Telescope went into service at the Kitt Peak National Observatory in Arizona. At 158 inches (400 cm) it was, at the time, the second-largest telescope in the world after the 200 inches (510 cm) Hale Telescope at the Palomar Observatory in California.
- Born:
  - Peter Andre, British English pop singer; in Harrow, London.
  - Paola Iezzi, Italian actress and pop music singer with the Italian duo Paola e Chiara; in Milan
- Died: G. Hermon Gill, 77, Royal Australian Navy Commander and naval historian

== February 28, 1973 (Wednesday) ==
- A group of 200 Oglala Sioux members of the American Indian Movement (AIM) seized the town of Wounded Knee, South Dakota, located within the borders of the Pine Ridge Indian Reservation after being unable to remove the Oglala Reservation Chairman, Dick Wilson, and would hold it for the next 71 days. Frank Fools Crow, the senior elder of the Oglala, and AIM leader Russell Means led the occupation.
- Elections were held in the Republic of Ireland for the 144-seat Dáil Éireann, the lower house of Ireland's bicameral parliament, the Oireachtas. Fianna Fáil, led by Prime Minister Jack Lynch and holding a bare majority with 74 seats before the election, lost six seats, while the two opposition parties, Liam Cosgrave's Fine Gael and Brendan Corish's Labour Party gained 3 and 2 seats to combine for 73 and control of the government. Lynch became the first Taoiseach (prime minister) to concede defeat live on Irish television, and Cosgrave was sworn in as the new Taoiseach on March 14.
- General Alphonse Alley, who had served as the President of the west African nation of Dahomey (now Benin) in 1968, was arrested along with 14 other people including a former cabinet member, Major Jean-Baptiste Hachème, and the former Minister of Finance, Pascal Chabi Kao. All three were accused by President Mathieu Kérékou of plotting a coup d'état, then convicted and sentenced to 20 years at hard labor. They would be released by Kérékou in 1984.
- Former Nationalist Chinese General Fu Zuoyi, who had surrendered Beijing to the Communists of Mao Zedong on October 1, 1949, without a fight, made a speech at Beijing's Great Hall of the People, published the next day in the People's Daily, and invited the government of Nationalist China's Chiang Kai-shek to join in discussions for the reunification. "It is now high time to unify the motherland," Fu told an audience in the Taiwan Room of the Great Hall. "Let us come together and talk, the sooner the better." After betraying the Nationalist Chinese government, Fu had become prominent in the People's Republic of China as the Vice Chairman of the National Committee of the Chinese People's Political Consultative Conference.
- The landmark postmodern novel Gravity's Rainbow by Thomas Pynchon was published.
- Born:
  - Eric Lindros, Canadian NHL player who won recognition as the league's most valuable player in 1995 from both the Professional Hockey Writers' Association (the Hart Memorial Trophy) and the NHL Players' Association (the Lester B. Pearson Award, later an inductee into the Hockey Hall of Fame; in London, Ontario.
  - Pedro Pablo Nakada Ludeña, Peruvian serial murderer who killed more than 17 people over a period of two years; in Lima
- Died:
  - Tito Rodríguez, 50, Puerto Rican singer and bandleader, of leukemia.
  - Dr. Harold E. B. Pardee, 86, pioneer cardiologist known for setting the standards for interpretation of electrocardiogram information. Two of the wave formations characteristic of an infarction and of ischemia, Pardee's wave and Pardee's sign, are named for him.
  - Admiral Józef Unrug, 88, Polish officer who rebuilt the Navy of Poland after World War One and was later incarcerated as a prisoner of war in Nazi Germany
  - Albert Franck, 73, Netherlands-born Canadian artist
