= Nahed Hattar =

Jordanian writer and political activist

- ناهض حتر
- Born: 1960; Amman, Jordan
- Died: 25 September 2016 (aged 55–56); Amman, Jordan
- Cause of death: Assassination by gunshots
- Education: University of Jordan
- Occupations: Writer and political activist
- Movement: Jordanian Social Left Movement

Nahed Hattar (Arabic: ناهض حتر Nāhiḍ Ḥattar [na:hidˤ ħɑt.taɾˤ]; 1960 – 25 September 2016) was a Jordanian writer and political activist.

On September 25, 2016, he was shot dead outside the court as he arrived at the trial for sharing a caricature that was viewed as insulting religious beliefs.

== Early life ==
Nahed Hattar was born in 1960 in Amman, Jordan. He was raised as a Christian and later considered himself an atheist.

== Political views ==
Hattar led progressive and left-wing political movements, in particular he held a leadership role in two political groups: the National Progressive Current and the Jordanian Social Left Movement. He was highly critical of neo-liberal economic policies in Jordan. He defended the right of Arab Christians to armed resistance against terrorist groups such as Al-Nusra, Al-Qaeda, and the Islamic State of Iraq and the Levant. Moreover, he was a strong supporter of former Syrian President Bashar al-Assad. The writer was also outspoken against Jordan becoming an "alternative homeland” for Palestinians and defended the Palestinian right of return.

== Arrest ==
In August 2016, Hattar shared a caricature on the social media network Facebook that depicted the dead jihadist Abu Saleh in a tent in heaven smoking in bed with two women and asking a corporeal God to bring him wine and cashews. The man also orders God to clear his dishes and build a door for his tent so God can knock before entering. The cartoon sparked controversy, some regarding it as insulting to Islam.

As a result of sharing the cartoon, the writer was charged with the crime of inciting "sectarian strife and racism" in violation of article 150 of the Jordanian Penal Code, which punishes any form of speech that drives sectarian or racial prejudices or incites conflict between different sects. He was also charged for violating article 278 of the Jordanian Penal Code, which prohibits the publication of printed material, image or drawing intended to offend religious beliefs. Hattar was detained for a week following the criminal charges.

The writer issued an apology on Facebook clarifying that he did not intend to insult God through sharing the cartoon, rather the cartoon represented the "God of Daesh" and was meant to mock how terrorists perceived heaven. He added that he respected "the believers who did not understand the satire behind the cartoon".

== Death ==
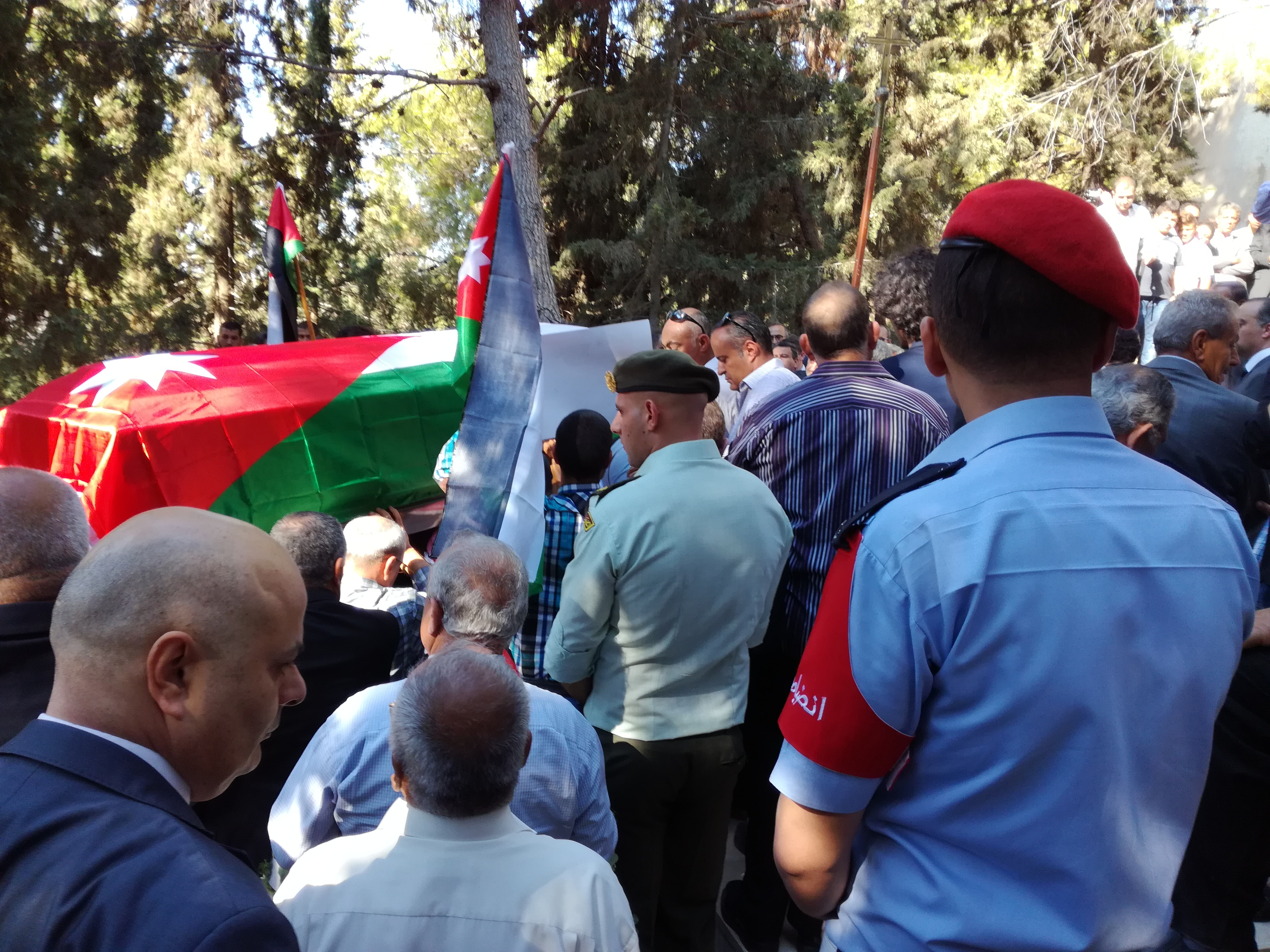
Mourners carry the coffin of Hattar at his funeral, 28 September 2016

On the morning of 25 September 2016, Hattar was shot to death by a gunman near the Palace of Justice in the capital Amman, where he was on his way to attend a court hearing.

The gunman was arrested at the scene. A security source identified the suspect as 49-year-old Riad Ismaeel Abdullah, a resident of east Amman. Abdullah was a preacher at a mosque in Amman and an extremist. He was sentenced to death in November and was executed on the dawn of 4 March 2017, along with 14 other criminals charged with terrorism and rape of minors.

Some conservative Jordanian Muslims considered Hattar's sharing of the cartoon as offensive. Jordan's most senior official religious authority criticised Hattar for what they perceived as an "insult to the divine entity, Islam and religious symbols". However, they had also condemned his murder.

=== Reactions ===
Domestic

- Jordan - The Jordanian government condemned the assassination of Hattar and started detaining social media users spreading hate speech. A day following the killing, the government issued a gag order preventing any further publication relating to the event in order to preserve the secrecy of the investigation.

International

- UNESCO – The Director-General of UNESCO, Irina Bokova condemned the murder of Nahed Hattar, which constitutes a grave attack on freedom of expression and affects Jordanian society as a whole.
- Human Rights Watch – HRW Director for Middle East and North Africa Sarah Leah Whitson declared: "Nahed Hattar’s senseless murder in front of an Amman courthouse comes on the heels of the government’s senseless charges against him over a cartoon he posted to his Facebook page", adding that "arbitrary prosecutions for defamation of religion stigmatize individuals and make them targets for vigilante reprisals."

== See also ==
- Censorship in Islamic societies
- Charlie Hebdo shooting
- Chokri Belaid
- Mahdi Amel
