= March 1973 =

Month of 1973

<<	March 1973					>>
Su	Mo	Tu	We	Th	Fr	Sa
				1	2	3
4	5	6	7	8	9	10
11	12	13	14	15	16	17
18	19	20	21	22	23	24
25	26	27	28	29	30	31

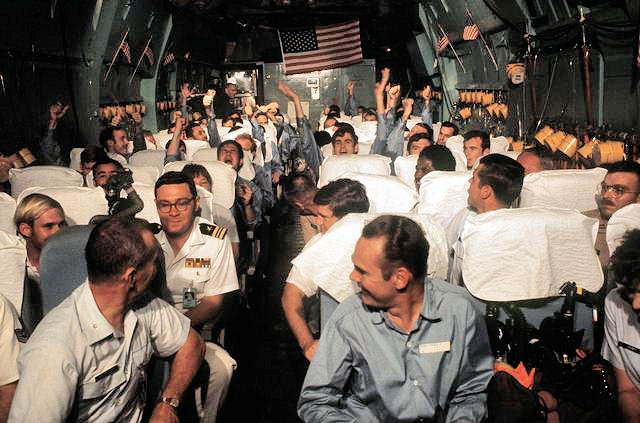
March 28, 1973: The last group of U.S. prisoners of war released from North Vietnam depart from Hanoi

The following events occurred in March 1973:

== March 1, 1973 (Thursday) ==
- Pink Floyd's The Dark Side of the Moon, one of rock's landmark albums, was released in the U.S.; sale in the UK began on March 24.
- U.S. Ambassador to Sudan Cleo A. Noel Jr., and his chargé d'affaires, Curtis Moore, were kidnapped and murdered by terrorists from the Palestinian group Black September Organization, in an attack on the Saudi Arabian Embassy in Khartoum. Guy Eid, the Belgian Embassy's chargé d'affaires, was wounded in the attack. After the U.S. refused to meet the terrorist demand for the release of assassin Sirhan Sirhan (who had killed presidential candidate Robert F. Kennedy in 1968), the terrorists killed Noel, Moore and Eid.
- The Xerox Alto, the first computer with a graphical operating system (a vertical monitor that displayed keyboard choices of operation to the user) and a mouse (with three buttons), became available for sale or lease. The Alto I was developed by the Palo Alto Research Center of the Xerox Corporation.
- The Iraq Petroleum Company (IPC), whose assets and operations were nationalized by Iraq in 1968, reached a settlement agreement with the Iraqi government, clearing the way for other Middle Eastern nations to take control of the oil production in their nations.
- British MP Dick Taverne, having resigned from the Parliament on leaving the Labour Party, was re-elected as a 'Democratic Labour' candidate.
- Admiral Sourendra Nath Kohli became Chief of Staff of the Indian Navy.
- The American Indian Movement (AIM) occupiers of Wounded Knee, South Dakota, released the 11 hostages that they had taken two days earlier, but continued their standoff and seizure of the Bureau of Indian Affairs building. On March 10, agents of the U.S. Department of Justice ended their blockade of the town and AIM activists left the trenches that they had dug in preparation for a fight, but the cease-fire ended the next day when an FBI agent, Curtis Fitzgerald, was shot and wounded by an AIM sniper.
- Two men kidnapped the mayor of Gallup, New Mexico, from City Hall and then barricaded themselves in a nearby sporting goods store, apparently because of his nomination to the board of regents of the University of New Mexico. Mayor Emmett Garcia was able to escape from a window after police fired tear gas into the store. His kidnapper, a university student, then killed himself.

== March 2, 1973 (Friday) ==
- Fourteen construction workers were killed and 34 injured when the center section of the 26-story Skyline Plaza collapsed in Bailey's Crossroads, Virginia (outside Washington D.C.), sending concrete and steel down on workers below. Workers had completed 23 of the stories and were working on the 24th floor that suddenly gave way under the weight of a crane that was hauling wet concrete to the top. Six bodies were recovered immediately and 12 other people were missing and feared dead.
- U.S. Secretary of State William P. Rogers announced that the U.S. and China had reached an agreement in principle to settle U.S. claims against the People's Republic dating back to 1949 for $200 million worth of confiscated property, and the Communists claim for $100 million of frozen Chinese assets in U.S. banks.
- The popular Hungarian musical Képzelt riport egy amerikai popfesztiválról (An Imaginary Report on an American Rock Festival), with music by Gábor Presser and lyrics by Anna Adamis, premiered at the Comedy Theatre of Budapest and popularized rock music in the Communist-ruled nation, then toured other Communist nations with performances in East Germany, Romania, Yugoslavia and Czechoslovakia.
- Died: Joe "Red" Hayes, 46, American fiddle player and songwriter with the Faron Young country music band, died of a heart attack after playing at a concert in Manchester while on the "Road to Nashville" tour of the United Kingdom. Young's band was traveling on a bus to its next stop when, as a British newspaper noted, he "died in a coach while travelling from Manchester to Chatham for a concert."

== March 3, 1973 (Saturday) ==
- All 25 people aboard Balkan Bulgarian Airlines Flight 307 were killed when the Ilyushin Il-18 airplane crashed while attempting a landing at Moscow's Sheremetyevo Airport after having departed from Sofia.
- King Hassan II announced his policy of "Moroccanization", forcing the transfer of any businesses, farmlands and assets that were more than 50% owned by foreigners to Moroccan individuals, generally political and military allies of the King.
- The Convention on International Trade in Endangered Species of Wild Fauna and Flora (CITES) was signed in Washington D.C. at a meeting of representatives of 80 nations, and would enter into effect on July 1, 1975.
- Two IRA bombs exploded in London, injuring 250 people, one fatally. Ten people were arrested hours later at Heathrow Airport, on suspicion of being involved in the bombings.
- The Indian state of Orissa was brought under President's rule at the request of Governor B. D. Jatti, after the government of Chief Minister Nandini Satpathy had lost its majority in the state legislature. Jatti dissolved the state legislative assembly after opposition leader Biju Patnaik was preparing to form a state government.
- The International Track Association (ITA), the first attempt to pay track and field athletes for their work, held its first track meet. Competition took place at an indoor event at Idaho State University in Pocatello, Idaho, in front of a crowd of 10,480. Three indoor world records (in the 100m dash by Warren Edmonson, the 600m run by Lee Edmonson and the high jump by John Radetich) being improved upon, though the marks were not recognized as world records by the International Amateur Athletic Federation. In 10 events for men and four for women, winners received $500 (equivalent to almost $3,500 fifty years later), with $250 for second place, $100 for third and $50 for fourth. An additional $500 was awarded for setting a new world record. The ITA had originally announced its plans on October 25, 1972, after the Summer Olympics in Munich, and signed several of the most famous stars of the time. The ITA was unable to become viable, in part because star amateur athletes were privately being paid higher amounts. The last ITA meet would take place on August 25, 1976.
- Tottenham Hotspur won the English Football League Cup final at Wembley, beating Norwich City 1–0. The Spurs had finished in sixth place in First Division competition in 1972, while Norwich City had won the Second Division and a promotion.
- At the 15th Grammy Awards, Record of the Year was won by Joel Dorn (producer) & Roberta Flack for "The First Time Ever I Saw Your Face" performed by Roberta Flack, and Album of the Year by Phil Spector (producer), George Harrison (producer & artist), Eric Clapton, Bob Dylan, Billy Preston, Leon Russell, Ravi Shankar, Ringo Starr & Klaus Voormann for The Concert for Bangla Desh
- The aging British liner HMS Royal Ulsterman was sabotaged and sunk in the Lebanese harbor of Beirut.
- Born: Xavier Bettel, Prime Minister of Luxembourg since 2013; in Luxembourg City
- Died:
  - Louis Prosper Gros, 79, French flying ace
  - Nikolai Nikitin, 65, Soviet structural designer and construction engineer
  - Antanina Vainiūnaitė-Kubertavičienė, 76, Lithuanian—Soviet stage actress

== March 4, 1973 (Sunday) ==
- Elections were held in Chile for the 150 seats in the Chamber of Deputies and for 25 of the 50 seats in the Chilean Senate. The opposition Confederation of Democracy won 30-19 control of the Senate and 87–63 in the House against President Salvador Allende's leftist Popular Unity alliance, but still lacked a two-thirds majority necessary for impeaching Allende or blocking his policies. The parliament's activities would be suspended almost four months later after the Chilean Armed Forces staged a coup d'état.
- The first round of voting took place in France the elections for the 490-seat National Assembly, with followup voting on March for races where no candidate had initially received a majority.
- The British yacht Auralyn was struck by a whale off of the coast of Guatemala and sank in the Pacific Ocean. Sailors Maurice and Maralyn Bailey would drift for 117 days later on a life raft before being rescued on June 30.
- The release of a large group of American prisoners of war took place, including (from the U.S. Air Force) Colonel Norman C. Gaddis; Major Leo K. Thorsness, awarded the Medal of Honor on his return; Captain Douglas "Pete" Peterson, who would later return to Hanoi as the first U.S. Ambassador to the Democratic Republic of Vietnam; Major James H. Kasler; First Lieutenant Edward L. Hubbard; First Lieutenant Leroy W. Stutz and from the Navy, Lieutenant Commander Richard A. Stratton; Lieutenant Commander John H. Fellowes; and Captain Eugene McDaniel; Commander William P. Lawrence (later Superintendent of the U.S. Naval Academy); Lieutenant George Coker; Naval Aviator Edward H. Martin
- Born:
  - Penny Mordaunt, British politician, Leader of the House of Commons since 2022, former Secretary for Defence; in Torquay, Devonshire
  - Chandra Sekhar Yeleti, Telugu language Indian film director; in Tuni, Andhra Pradesh
- Died:
  - Adi Bitar, 48, Palestinian Dubaian judge who authored the first constitution of the United Arab Emirates, died of colon cancer.
  - Elamkulam Kunjan Pillai, 68, Indian historian

== March 5, 1973 (Monday) ==
- The crash of Iberia Airlines Flight 504 after a mid-air collision in France killed all 68 people aboard after the DC-9 was struck by another airliner in an accident which happened while both were flying over La Planche in the Loire-Atlantique département, near Nantes. The Iberia DC-9, with 61 passengers and nine crew, was returning mostly passengers to London after a holiday on the Mediterranean island of Mallorca. Spantax Flight 400 was a Convair CV-990 on its way to London from Madrid. Both aircraft had been cleared for an altitude of 29,000 feet (8,800 m) by substitute air traffic controllers who were filling in during a strike. Without clearance from any controller, the crew of the Spantax began a 360 degree turn and its left wing struck the Iberia plane, which went out of control. The Spantax airliner was able to make an emergency landing at Cognac-Châteaubernard Air Base.
- The Pacific Legal Foundation was incorporated in Sacramento, California, making it the first and oldest conservative/libertarian public interest law firm in the United States.
- The "Great Michigan Pizza Funeral" was held by the frustrated owner of a food processing factory, Mario Fabbrini of Fabbrini Family Foods, near Ossineke, Michigan. The company had been ordered by the Food and Drug Administration (FDA) to recall the pizzas on suspicion that the mushroom pizzas had botulism-causing bacteria. The pizzas were tipped into an 18-foot (5.5 m) deep hole in the ground before a crowd of onlookers, who were addressed by Michigan governor William Milliken.
- Donald DeFreeze, who would co-found the U.S. Symbionese Liberation Army (SLA) terrorist group, escaped from Soledad Prison in California, where he was two years away from completing a 6-year sentence. After his escape, he met Patricia Soltysik and the two created the SLA.
- Died: Michael Jeffery, 39, English music business manager, was killed in Nantes mid-air collision.

== March 6, 1973 (Tuesday) ==
- The Office of the U.S. Immigration Department in New York City cancelled John Lennon's visa extension five days after granting it. On March 23, the Immigration and Naturalization Service (INS) told Lennon that he had 60 days (until May 5) to voluntarily leave the United States because of a 1968 conviction in the UK for possession of hashish. Lennon's wife Yoko Ono's application for permanent resident alien status was approved. Lennon had lived in the U.S. since August 13, 1971.
- Operation End Sweep was resumed after a short suspension prompted by North Vietnamese delays in releasing prisoners-of-war.
- Spring training and exhibition games opened for the 1973 baseball season in the U.S., with the first test of the American League's new designated hitter rule being done with Larry Hisle of the Minnesota Twins, who hit two home runs in five times at bat. Ron Blomberg of the New York Yankees would become the first DH in a major league game on April 6.
- Born: Joshua Bergasse, American choreographer and dancer; in Farmington Hills, Michigan
- Died: Pearl S. Buck, 80, U.S. novelist and Nobel Laureate

== March 7, 1973 (Wednesday) ==
- Nationwide voting was held in Bangladesh for the first time, with all 300 seats in the Jatiya Sangsad, the nation's national parliament to be filled. The Awami League, led by President Mujibur Rahman, won all but seven of the seats.
- The first photographs of Comet Kohoutek were taken, as Czech astronomer Luboš Kohoutek was photographing the night skies from the Hamburg Observatory in Bergedorf, West Germany, while looking for the return of a different comet. On comparison of the first photos to a set taken two days later, Kohoutek realized on March 18 that he had discovered a new astronomical object. Initially promoted as what would be the brightest comet since Halley's, Comet Kohoutek would be barely visible in the night skies.
- Barend Biesheuvel announced his resignation as Prime Minister of the Netherlands along with his coalition government of ministers, though he would serve until a new government could be formed by Joop den Uyl in May.
- Born:
  - Arnab Goswami, Indian news anchor and journalist; in Guwahati, Assam state
  - Esad Landžo, convicted Bosnian war criminal; in Glavatičevo, SR Bosnia i Hercegovina, Yugoslavia
- Died: Johann Risztics, 78, Austro-Hungarian flying ace during World War One and later a test pilot

== March 8, 1973 (Thursday) ==
- In the "Border Poll", voters in Northern Ireland elected to remain part of the United Kingdom. Irish nationalists were encouraged to boycott the referendum. Turnout was 58.7%, but less than 1% for Catholics.
- Two car bombs exploded in front of Whitehall and the Old Bailey in London within 10 minutes of each other, injuring as many as 300 people, one fatally, in what one reporter described as "the worst scenes of destruction since the World War II blitz." Police found two other parked cars with large bombs and defused both before they were set to go off. The bombs had been placed by the Provisional Irish Republican Army in an apparent protest against the Northern Ireland referendum.
- A fire at the Whiskey Au Go Go nightclub in Brisbane, Australia, killed 15 people. The fire was caused by arsonists who threw two 23-litre drums of diesel fuel into the building's foyer and set it alight. James Richard Finch, 29, and John Andrew Stuart, 33, were later convicted of the crime.
- The South Vietnamese government made its second prisoner exchange of POWs with North Vietnam, releasing 499 captured soldiers at the border in Quang Tri province. The South had 6,300 POWs and the North had 1,250.
- The crash of a U.S. Army C-47 killed the 11 members of The Golden Knights, the Army's parachute demonstration team, as they were practicing from their base at Fort Bragg, North Carolina.
- Born: Alexander Kushaev, Russian film and television producer; in Moscow, Soviet Union
- Died:
  - Ron "Pigpen" McKernan, 27, American musician and founding member of the Grateful Dead, died of a gastrointestinal hemorrhage as a consequence of alcoholism.
  - Bill Malone (stage name for William Malone Polglase), 48, American game show host known for Supermarket Sweep, was killed in a car accident, while driving on the New Jersey Turnpike, after crashing into an overturned Greyhound bus during a rainstorm.

== March 9, 1973 (Friday) ==
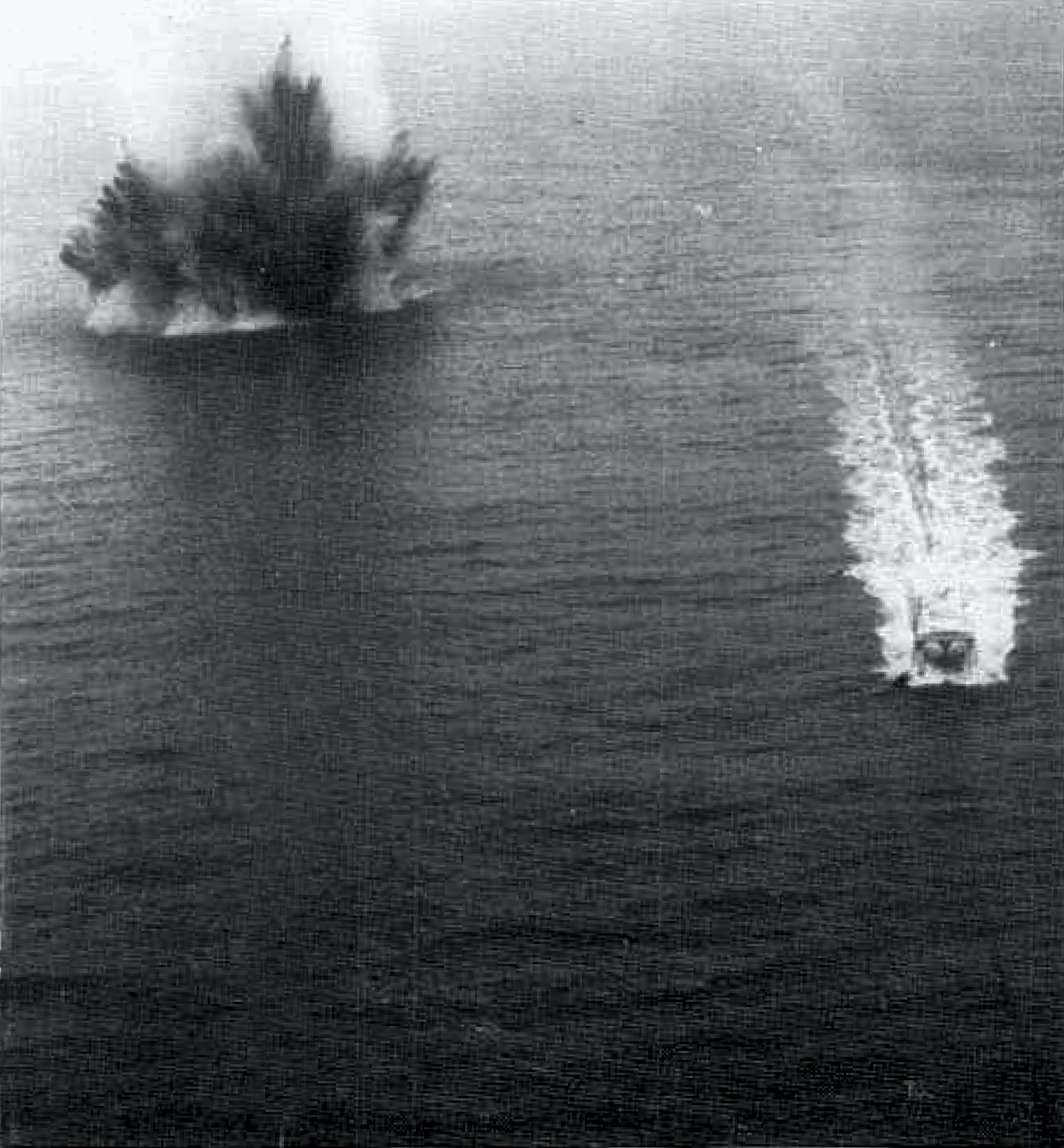
The lone explosion of Operation End Sweep

- Operation End Sweep, the minesweeping exercise carried out by the United States Navy and United States Marine Corps to remove naval mines from Haiphong harbor and other coastal and inland waterways in North Vietnam, exploded its first and only mine to during the operation, although it did remove other mines in the harbors. A Pentagon spokesman said that many of the several thousand mines that had been dropped ten months earlier in 1972 "had gone inert and lay harmless on the sea floor."
- At Oberstdorf in West Germany, Heinz Wossipiwo of East Germany broke the record for longest ski jump, landing 554 feet (169 m) from takeoff from the Heini-Klopfer-Skiflugschanze. Walter Steiner of Switzerland flew even further, touching down at 574 feet (175 m) but crashing, preventing him from recognition of a new record. Two days later, Steiner would leap 587 feet (179 m) and crash.

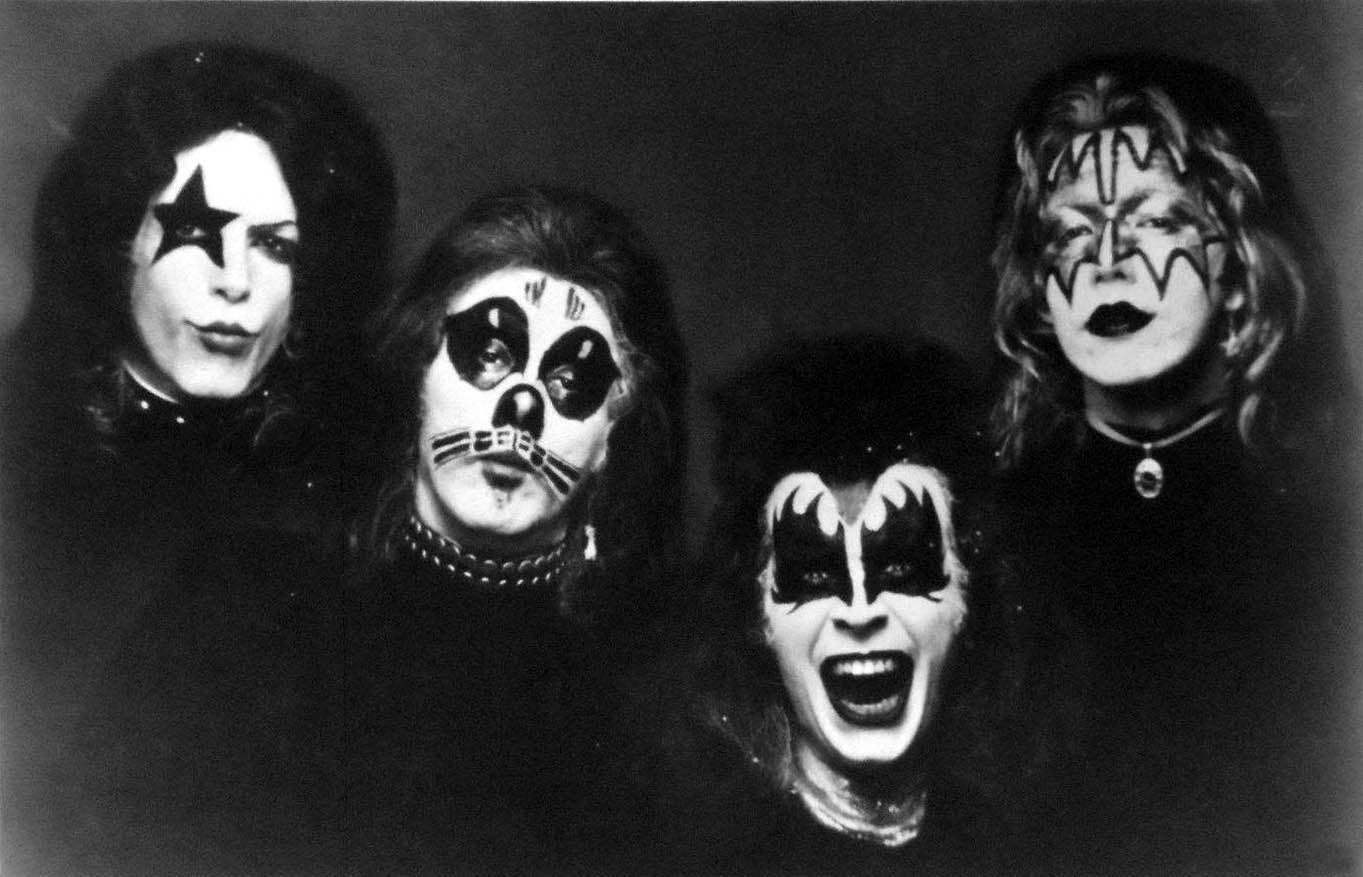
Stanley, Criss, Simmons and Frehley in their original makeup, 1974

- The members of the rock band Kiss gave their first performance in the makeup and iconic character designs that would become their trademark. The band had played in face makeup in their debut concert on January 30, but reworked the format for their two-night performance at The Daisy, a bar in Amityville, New York.
- Born: Danny Green, Australian professional boxer, WBC super-middleweight champion 2003-2005 and WBA light-heavyweight champion 2007–2008; in Perth, Western Australia

== March 10, 1973 (Saturday) ==
- Sir Richard Sharples, 56, Governor of Bermuda, was assassinated while walking with his aide-de-camp, Captain Hugh Sayers of the Welsh Guards, and his dog. Both men and the dog were ambushed and shot to death outside of Sharples's residence at Government House in Hamilton. Seven months later, Erskine "Buck" Burrows would confess to the shooting after being arrested; Burrows also admitted to having murdered, on September 9, 1972, Bermuda Police Commissioner George Duckett. Burrows would be hanged on December 2, 1977, after being convicted of multiple murders.
- Ephraim Katzir, a biophysicist at Harvard University in the U.S., was elected to a five-year term as President of Israel, with the members of the Knesset voting 66 to 41 in his race against Rabbi Ephraim Urbach. Katzir, who was known outside of Israel by his birth name of Ephraim Katchalski, took office on May 24 to succeed Zalman Shazar.
- Attorney Charles Colson resigned as Director of the White House Office of Public Liaison to return to private practice, after serving as the "hatchet man" for U.S. President Nixon. In 1974, Colson would be indicted and convicted on charges of obstruction of justice in connection with the cover-up of evidence connecting the White House to the Watergate burglary. While awaiting trial, he would become an evangelical Christian.
- Born: Liu Qiangdong, Chinese internet entrepreneur and billionaire who founded the service JD.com to sell and deliver products to online customers; in Suqian, Jiangsu province
- Died:
  - Evelyn Baring, Baron Howick, 69, British colonial official who served as Governor of Southern Rhodesia (now Zimbabwe) 1942 to 1944 and Governor of Kenya 1952 to 1959.
  - General Li Mi, 70, Nationalist Chinese officer who had fought in the Chinese Civil War against the Communist Chinese

== March 11, 1973 (Sunday) ==
- In the first free elections in Argentina since 1963, dentist Héctor Cámpora was elected the first civilian president of the South American nation after nearly a decade of military rule. Running on the premise of being a caretaker, he would serve only four months before relinquishing the position in favor of former dictator Juan Perón. Cámpora received almost 50 percent of the vote to defeat eight other challengers, including second-place finisher Ricardo Balbín and Francisco Manrique. In the Argentine Congress, Cámpora's Partido Justicialista won 146 of the 253 seats in the Chamber of Deputies of the Nation and 45 of the 69 seats in the Senate of the Argentine Nation. General Alejandro A. Lanusse, president of the military regime the governed Argentina, reluctantly confirmed the Peronist candidate's victory and said "The popular mandate will be inexorably carried out."
- In the second round of voting for France's national assembly, the left won an increased number of votes and MPs, but the majority party of President Georges Pompidou won the election.
- The Soviet Union's lunar rover Lunokhod 2 began its third round of activity on the Moon's surface.
- The Broadway play 42 Seconds from Broadway, written by Louis Del Grande, opened at the Playhouse Theatre in New York City and closed after one performance.
- Born: Lilí Brillanti, Mexican television hostess; in Mexico City
- Died:
  - Tim Buck, 82, General Secretary of the Communist Party of Canada from 1929 to 1962 and its honorary chairman since 1962.
  - Manuel Rojas, 77, Chilean novelist and journalist

== March 12, 1973 (Monday) ==
- John T. Downey, the longest-held prisoner of war in United States history, was released after more than 20 years in prison as a humanitarian gesture by the People's Republic of China. Downey crossed over the Sham Chun River bridge from Shenzhen into British Hong Kong. Downey, a pilot for the Central Intelligence Agency (CIA), had been captured in Manchuria on November 29, 1952, along with Richard Fecteau while on a mission to extract a CIA courier. Fecteau had been set free on December 13, 1971. Downey's release came after U.S. President Nixon had publicly admitted that Downey had been a CIA agent, and after a personal request by Nixon to China's Premier Zhou Enlai following a stroke suffered by Downey's mother.
- U.S. President Richard Nixon announced that he was expanding the protection of executive privilege, the means in which the U.S. president and staff were immune from having to testify or answer questions about White House events while in office, and said that it applied to former staff members as well.
- The Italian ore freighter Igara sank one day after striking a rock near Merdarik Island after passing through the Sunda Stait in the South China Sea. Although her 38-man crew was all rescued, the ship was a total loss with a value of US$25 million, the largest marine insurance payout up to that time. While part of the stern of the ship stuck out of the water, the bow section went down in the 130 feet (40 m) deep section of sea and has remained there for more than fifty years.
- In Chachoengsao Province, Thailand, an unidentified soldier threw a grenade into a large crowd at a temple fair, killing one person and injuring 25 when he got upset over music being played.
- The final episode of U.S. comedy series Rowan and Martin's Laugh-In, at one-time the most popular show on television but the victim of declining ratings, aired on NBC.
- Ben Villaflor of the Philippines, the World Boxing Association (WBA) super-featherweight champion, lost to Japanese challenger Kuniaki Shibata in 15 rounds in a bout in Honolulu, Hawaii. In a rematch on October 17, he would win back his title by defeating Shibata.

== March 13, 1973 (Tuesday) ==
- Voting began for the new President of Turkey, to be chosen by the electors of the Grand National Assembly of Turkey. No candidate received the required 2/3rds majority on the first ballot, and more voting took place until a winner could be found. President Cevdet Sunay's term expired on March 28 with no successor being receiving the necessary majority, and a winner was not selected until the 15th ballot on April 6, 1973.
- Syria adopted a new constitution.
- The first wreck of Amtrak's new "Auto Train" happened near Hortense, Georgia when a log-carrying truck crashed into the side of the train and derailed 21 of its cars. The truck driver was killed, and 19 of the train passengers injured, overturning most of the vehicles that were being transported as part of the Auto Train service.
- Born:
  - Edgar Davids, Surinam-born Dutch footballer and manager; in Paramaribo
  - Eloy de Jong, Dutch pop music singer; in The Hague
  - David Draiman, American singer and musician; in Brooklyn, New York
- Died: Melville Cooper, 76, English-born American character actor on film

== March 14, 1973 (Wednesday) ==
- Liam Cosgrave was sworn in to office as the new Taoiseach (Prime Minister) of the Republic of Ireland two weeks after his Fine Gael and the Labour Party defeated Jack Lynch's Fianna Fáil party in the February 28 parliamentary elections.
- The National University of Costa Rica began classes as the fifth public university in the Central American nation.
- North Vietnam released 108 additional American prisoners of war, including future U.S. Senator and presidential candidate John McCain, a U.S. Navy lieutenant commander at the time of his capture on October 26, 1967.
- The British television comedy Are You Being Served? made its debut on BBC-1 after its pilot had been shown on the anthology Comedy Playhouse on September 8, 1972, during the suspension of coverage of the Summer Olympics.
- The third mass release of U.S. prisoners of war from the Vietnam War took place as 108 military and one civilian were turned over to U.S. authorities at Hanoi, including (and future U.S. Senator and presidential candidate) U.S. Navy Lieutenant Commander John S. McCain III.
- Died:
  - Howard H. Aiken, 73, American physicist who, in 1937, launched the project of designing the first IBM computer, the Harvard Mark I and its successors
  - Murat "Chic" Young, 72, American cartoonist who had created the popular comic strip Blondie in 1930 and continued to draw it at the time of his death.
  - Ruth Allison Lilly, 81, American philanthropist
  - Rafael Godoy, 65, Colombian-born Venezuelan songwriter

== March 15, 1973 (Thursday) ==
- In a press conference on national television, U.S. President Richard M. Nixon implied that the United States was prepared to resume fighting of the Vietnam War if North Vietnam or the Viet Cong were to violate the ceasefire. Asked about infiltration of men and material by North Vietnam into South Vietnam, Nixon said "Based on my actions over the past four years, they should not lightly disregard such expressions of concern." The reaction of the American public to the possibility of going back to war was so unfavorable that the Case–Church Amendment would be passed overwhelmingly by Congress and signed into law on July 1, requiring Congressional approval in advance of any future military activity in Indochina.
- At the same conference, President Nixon said that he would not allow the FBI to turn over its files to a Congressional special committee, concerning the FBI investigation of the Watergate burglary. Nixon told reporters, "the practice of the FBI furninshing raw files to full committees must stop with this particular one."
- U.S. Air Force Captain Philip E. Smith was released from incarceration in the People's Republic of China after almost seven and one half years as a prisoner in Beijing, and U.S. Navy Lieutenant Robert J. Flynn was set free after more than five and a half years captivity. Captain Smith had flown into Chinese airspace on September 20, 1965, after becoming lost during an escort flight of a bomber over the Gulf of Tonkin in the Vietnam War, while Lieutenant Flynn had been captured after his airplane was shot down in Chinese territory on August 21, 1967. Both Smith and Flynn were allowed to cross the border into British Hong Kong.
- Two U.S. men in Homestead, Florida were arrested on charges of false imprisonment and conspiracy in a raid on what a Dade County sheriff's deputy described as a slave labor camp. A spokesman said that 27 migrant workers "were working against their will and were being held as slaves", one of them for the past four years, at the Far South Labor Camp, operated by labor contractor Joe L. Brown and guarded by Lafayette Matthew. Ostensibly, the laborers were paid three dollars per week, but Brown would take the money back at the end of the "pay" period for food and shelter.
- Nebraska became the first U.S. state to rescind its previous ratification of the proposed Equal Rights Amendment (ERA) to the United States Constitution. The 31 to 17 vote in Nebraska's one-chamber legislature, the Unicameral, Legislative Resolution Number 9 came less than one year after Nebraska had become the seventh state to ratify the ERA.
- Died:
  - K. M. Cherian, 76, Indian newspaper publisher who developed the Malayala Manorama into the world's most popular Malayalam language daily paper
  - Ilse Häfner-Mode, 70, German-Jewish artist
  - Jasper Maskelyne, 70, British stage magician known for his 1949 book Magic: Top Secret in which he claimed to have used his skills as an illusionist in counter-intelligence in World War II.

== March 16, 1973 (Friday) ==
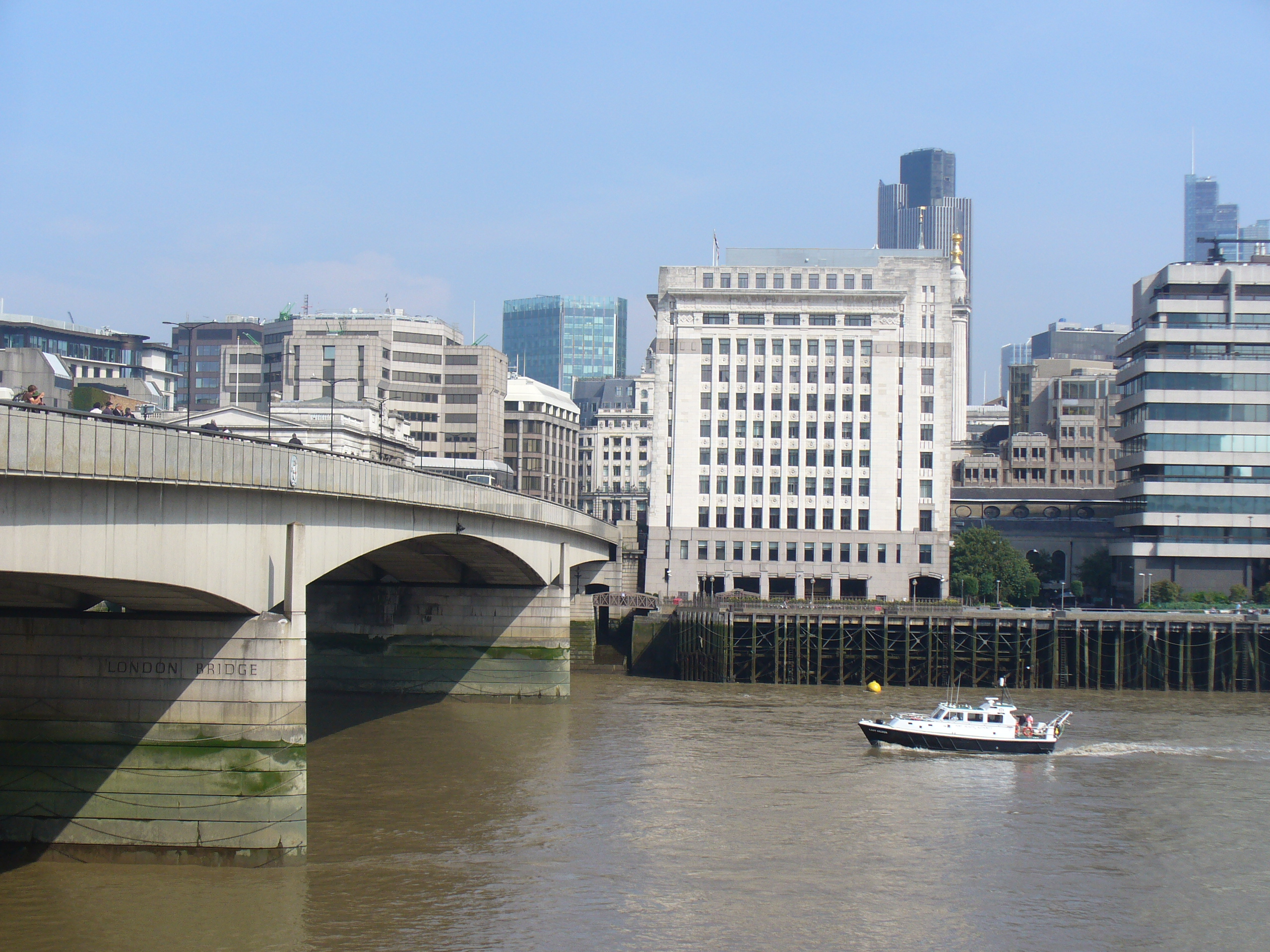
The current London Bridge

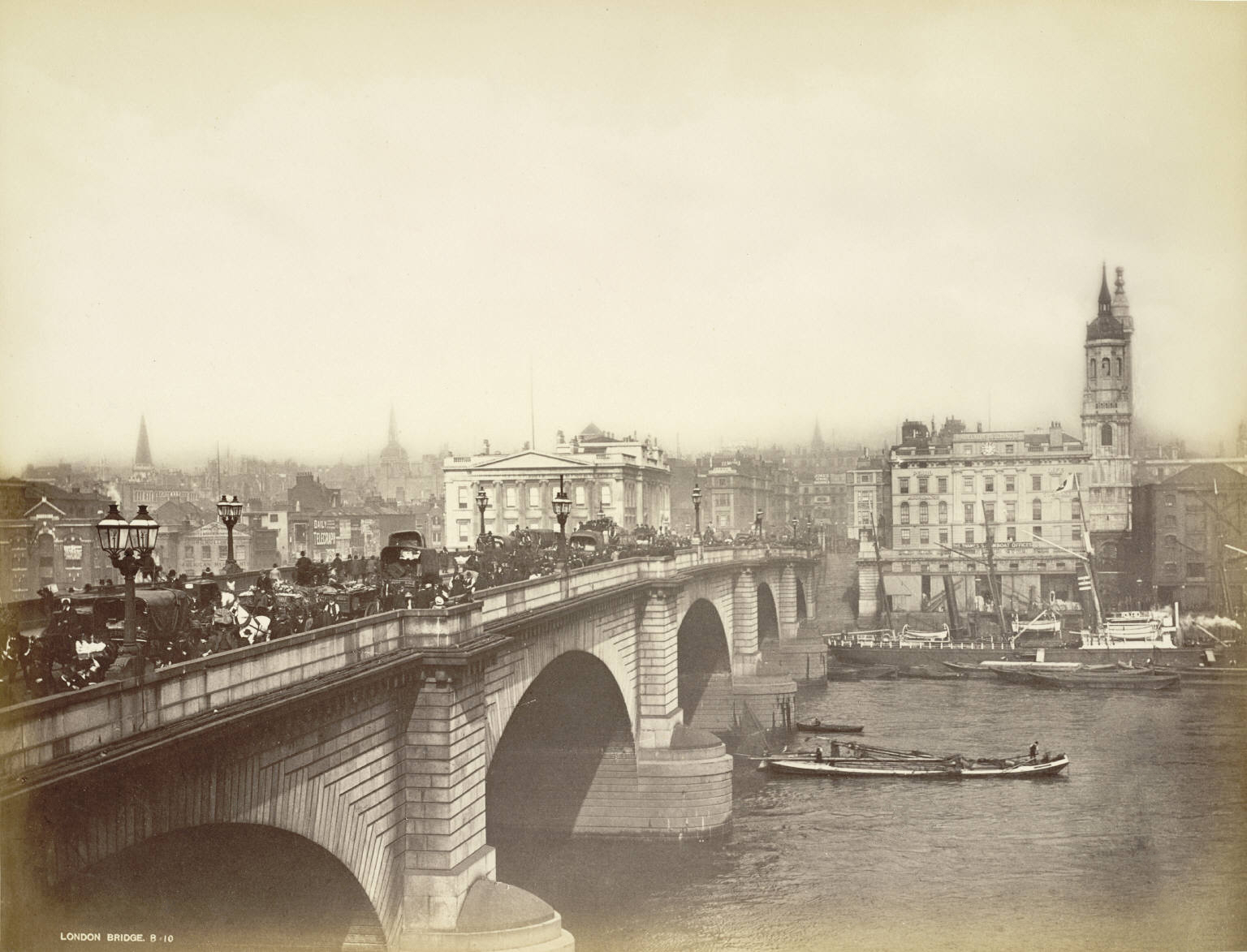
The previous London bridge

- Queen Elizabeth II of the United Kingdom opened the new London Bridge. The new structure was the third over the River Thames in the past 750 years.
- U.S. Army Captain Jim Thompson, the longest-held POW of the Vietnam War, was released after almost nine years of captivity in a Viet Cong prison in South Vietnam's Quang Tri province. On March 26, 1964, Captain Thompson had been a passenger on an observation plane that was shot down less than 13 miles (21 km) from the Special Forces Camp where he had been serving.
- The Writers Guild of America Awards were held at the Beverly Hilton Hotel in Los Angeles. The films Cabaret, What's Up, Doc?, The Godfather and The Candidate won major awards.
- The heaviest weight lifted up to that time, the 6,000 ton 12,000,000 pounds (5,400,000 kg) center span of the Fremont Bridge in Portland, Oregon, was accomplished with the placement of 32 hydraulic jacks working in tandem.
- Died:
  - José Gorostiza, 71, Mexican poet, educator, and diplomat
  - Gustavs Tūrs, 82, leader of the Evangelical Lutheran Church of Latvia in the Soviet Union as Archbishop of Riga from 1948 to 1968

== March 17, 1973 (Saturday) ==
- An angry pilot of the Khmer Air Force killed 43 people and injured 35 in Cambodia after making a dive bomb attack on the presidential palace in Phnom Penh. Most of the dead were inside the barracks of the Chamcar Mon Palace guards, including families of the guards. After the bombing, Captain So Patra flew his T-28 fighter bomber to an airstrip near Koh Kong near Khmer Rouge controlled territory, then to Communist China's Hainan Island. Subsequent investigation showed that So Patra was the son-in-law of former King Norodom Sihanouk, as husband of Sihanouk's daughter Botum Bopha, and that the death toll had increased to 36 people from two bombs. Arrested also were two more of Sihanouk's children, sons Norodom Ranareth and Nortodom Chahrapon, and daughter Bopha Devi and her husband.
- Three of the last four surviving members of the Bugojno group, Croatian separatists who had fought against the Yugoslavian Army on June 25, 1972, were executed. Duro Horvat, Vejsil Keškić and Mirko Vlasnović were shot by a firing squad at the police headquarters in Sarajevo.
- Many of the few remaining United States soldiers began to leave Vietnam. One reunion of a former POW with his family would be immortalized in the Pulitzer Prize-winning photograph Burst of Joy.
- At Dublin's Croke Park, Leinster GAA defeated Munster, 1–13 to 2-08 (17 to 14) to win the Railway Cup, the Gaelic Athletic Association championship in Ireland's sport of hurling.
- The University of Wisconsin Badgers won the NCAA ice hockey championship at the Boston Garden, defeating Denver 4 to 2. The tournament's most outstanding player, Wisconsin's Dean Talafous, would go on to a seven-year career in the National Hockey League.
- Born:
  - Caroline Corr, Irish musician and drummer of The Corrs; in Dundalk, County Louth
  - Rico Blanco, popular Filipino rock singer; in Manila
- Died:
  - Herbert D. Strauss, 63, American advertising executive and Chairman of the Grey Advertising Agency
  - Franz Rademacher, 67, convicted German war criminal known for the 1940 Madagascar Plan to deport Jews to the African island of Madagascar

== March 18, 1973 (Sunday) ==
- The U.S. Supreme Court decided the case of Gaffney v. Cummings, setting the current standard in the U.S. for determining fairness in reapportionment and determination of election districts. In a 6 to 3 decision, written by Justice Byron R. White, the court determined that a mean deviation of less than two percent between the number of persons in the largest and smallest districts was acceptable, and that a ruling on the fairness of a majority political party's geographical construction of a district was a political question reserved to determination by the individual states rather than the federal judiciary. White wrote "minor deviations from mathematical equality among state legislative districts are insufficient to make out a prima facie case of invidious discrimination... if for no other reason than that the basic statistical materials which legislatures and courts usually have to work with are the results of the United States census taken at 10-year intervals and published as soon as possible after the beginning of each decade. These figures may be as accurate as such immense undertakings can be, but they are inherently less than absolutely accurate. Those who know about such things recognize this fact."
- In Argentina, soccer football player Eduardo Maglioni set the record for fastest hat-trick by scoring three goals for Club Atlético Independiente of Avellaneda in 1 minute and 51 seconds, in a match against Gimnasia of La Plata.
- St John's High School, Dromore, County Tyrone, Northern Ireland, was bombed by the Ulster Volunteer Force, causing extensive damage.
- The Estadio 23 de Agosto opened in San Salvador de Jujuy, Argentina.
- In the U.S., one person was killed and 19 of 167 passengers were injured near East Palestine, Ohio, when the last five cars of Amtrak's westbound Broadway Limited were derailed in a heavy snowstorm. A spokesman said recent heavy rains may have weakened the roadbed beneath the rails.
- Died:
  - William Benton, 72, American publisher, chairman of the Board of the Encyclopædia Britannica company since 1943, and U.S. Senator for Connecticut, 1949 to 1953
  - Lauritz Melchior, 82, Danish-born opera tenor at the Copenhagen Opera and later at New York's Metropolitan Opera, died following a gall bladder operation.
  - Constantin von Dietze, 81, German agronomist who was one of the few persons to survive being implicated in the 1944 attempt to assassinate Adolf Hitler, the 20 July Plot. Von Dietze was awaiting trial when he was liberated from a Berlin prison in 1945.
  - Roland Dorgelès, 87, French novelist
  - Royce Howes, 72, Pulitzer Prize winning journalist and novelist

== March 19, 1973 (Monday) ==
- The Japanese entertainment conglomerate Konami was incorporated as Konami Industry Company. Its name was drawn from the first syllables of the surnames of its three founders, Kagemasa Kozuki, Yoshinobu Nakama, and Tatsuo Miyasako.
- Amnesty International issued its first "Urgent Action" bulletin, a regular notice sent to members to alert them of arrests of political prisoners whose nations' governments sanctioned torture. The first Urgent Action notice came after the arrest of Professor Luiz Basilio Rossi by the Brazilian military.
- All 58 people on an Air Vietnam flight from Saigon to Buon Me Thuot were killed when the South Vietnamese DC-4 exploded while on its approach to a landing.
- Died:
  - Weston Adams, 68, American sports executive, inductee to the Hockey Hall of Fame and owner of the Boston Bruins of the National Hockey League since 1936.
  - Lauritz Melchior, 82, Danish Wagnerian tenor
  - Sir Clement Price Thomas, 79, pioneering Welsh thoracic surgeon

== March 20, 1973 (Tuesday) ==
- The late Roberto Clemente was elected to the Baseball Hall of Fame less than six months after his last game, as the 424 members of the Baseball Writers' Association of America voted to waive the customary five-year waiting period in consideration of Clemente's death in an airplane crash on December 31, 1972. Clemente received 393 of the 420 votes for induction.
- At a closed-door meeting of the Soviet Communist Party's Politburo, the de facto rulers of the U.S.S.R. voted to not enforce the "diploma tax that had been implemented in August to charge significantly higher exit fees for Jews seeking to emigrate to Israel, based on the cost of the education paid for by the state. A study was presented to the Politburo and showed that less than 15 percent of the 25,000 adults applying for an exit visa had a college education, and that most of the Soviet Union's educated people preferred to remain at home, a finding that surprised most Politburo members. Party leader Leonid Brezhnev proposed eliminating the tax, based on a bill introduced in the U.S. Senate by Henry Jackson. Ultimately, the Politburo agreed with the KGB Director Yuri Andropov that, rather than appearing to bow to American pressure, the Soviets should simply keep the diploma tax on the books and decline to enforce it. The details of the meeting would become public decades later with the declassification of secret Kremlin records. On March 29, the Soviets "allowed about 70 Jews formerly subjected to the tax to leave without paying."
- The Republic of Iraq and the Kingdom of Kuwait fought a battle near al-Samirah, a border outpost in Kuwait across from the Iraqi town of Safwan, 18 days after Kuwait's Foreign Minister Sheikh Sabah Al-Ahmad Al-Sabah, had returned from discussions with Iraq's Deputy President Saddam Hussein. Two Kuwaiti policemen were killed, and the two nations prepared to go to war until both sides agreed to pull back their forces.
- The Eider Barrage was opened, protecting the mouth of the river Eider near Tönning on West Germany's North Sea coast from storm surges.
- A British government White Paper on Northern Ireland proposed the re-establishment of an Assembly elected by proportional representation, with a possible All-Ireland council which would lead to the unsuccessful Sunningdale Agreement of December 9.
- Born: Cedric Yarbrough, American actor and comedian known for Reno 911!; in Burnsville, Minnesota

== March 21, 1973 (Wednesday) ==
- Pieces of Moon rock samples from the Apollo 17 mission were sent by U.S. President Nixon to all 50 of the United States and to all the nations of the world, displayed on wooden plaques. In each case, a letter accompanied the presentation of samples from the last crewed mission to the Moon with a letter that said, in part, "In the deepest sense our exploration of the moon was truly an international effort. It is for this reason that, on behalf of the people of the United States I present this flag, which was carried to the moon, to the State, and its fragment of the moon obtained during the final lunar mission of the Apollo program. If people of many nations can act together to achieve the dreams of humanity in space, then surely we can act together to accomplish humanity's dream of peace here on earth."
- U.S. President Nixon and White House Counsel John Dean had a private conversation that was recorded, in which Dean warned of what he called "a cancer on the presidency" because the Watergate burglars had been paid money in return for their silence. Dean pointed out that he, Chief of Staff H. R. Haldeman, domestic policy adviser John Ehrlichman and former Attorney General John N. Mitchell had all been "involved in that" and that burglar E. Howard Hunt was demanding more money. Nixon replied, "Don't you have to handle Hunt's financial situation damn soon? You've got to keep the cap on the bottle..." the first suggestion of an obstruction of justice ordered by the president. Nixon would claim five months later that he had been unaware of an attempt at a cover-up before that day, saying in an August 15 speech that "It was not until March 21 of this year that I received new information from the White House counsel that led me to conclude that the reports I had been getting for over nine months were not true."
- The Lofthouse Colliery disaster killed seven miners in Great Britain.
- Iran nationalized all oil installations within its borders, forcing British, American, French and Dutch oil companies to hand over control with compensation set by the Iranians.
- Two Mirage fighter jets of the Libyan Air Force intercepted and fired upon a U.S. Air Force C-130 spy plane that was flying in the Gulf of Sidra. The C-130 was not damaged and escaped, and the U.S. Air Force said that it did not come closer than 75 miles (121 km) from the Libyan coast.
- Two bodies of two teenagers were found in "a wooded area near an abandoned lumber camp" in Gainesville, Florida after they had become the first of at least 22 young women who were victims of serial killer Gerald Eugene Stano. Janine Ligotino and Ann Arceneaux had been stabbed to death. Over the next seven years, Stano would kidnap and murder victims in the U.S. state of Florida until his arrest on March 25, 1980. Stano would be executed in 1998.
- Born:
  - Michael Milton, Australian skier and four-time Winter Paralympics gold medalist; in Canberra
  - Amanda Lewis, American TV talk show host; in Los Angeles
- Died: Bruce Elliott, American science fiction writer and stage magician, 58, from injuries sustained four months earlier when he was struck by a taxi.

== March 22, 1973 (Thursday) ==
- A hurricane in the Atlantic caused havoc with multiple shipping accidents, as All 32 crew on the cargo ship MV Anita drowned when the ship foundered.
- Thirty of the 31 crew of the MV Norse Variant were killed after the bulk carrier foundered in a hurricane in the Atlantic Ocean. The lone survivor, Stein Gabrielsen, had been clinging to a piece of debris for three days before he was spotted by the U.S. Coast Guard. day earlier, the ship had set out from Newport News, Virginia in the U.S. with a cargo of coal bound for Glasgow in Scotland.
- General Suharto was re-elected unopposed as President of Indonesia, and Ludvik Svoboda was re-elected unopposed as President of Czechoslovakia.
- The state of Washington ratified the Equal Rights Amendment.
- Ignis Varese of Italy won the European pro basketball championship, the FIBA European Champions Cup, defeating the Soviet Union's CSKA Moskva team in the final at Liège in Belgium, 71 to 66.
- Born:
  - Beverley Knight, English singer-songwriter, in Wolverhampton, West Midlands
  - Péter Oszkó, Hungarian politician and Finance Minister of Hungary 2009–2010; in Budapest
  - Alex Padilla, American politician, senior U.S. Senator from California, in Los Angeles
- Died:
  - Hughes "Binkie" Beaumont, 64, British theatre manager and producer
  - Hilda Geiringer, 79. Austrian mathematician known for her postulation of the Geiringer–Laman theorem

== March 23, 1973 (Friday) ==
- In a letter to Judge John Sirica, Watergate burglar James W. McCord Jr. admitted that he and other defendants had been pressured to remain silent about the case. McCord named former U.S. Attorney General John Mitchell as 'overall boss' of the operation.
- Born:
  - Grzegorz Kaliciak; Polish officer, in Prudnik, Poland
  - Mori Chack (Chakku Moriki), Japanese designer of "Gloomy Bear" and other Chax products; in Sakai, Osaka

== March 24, 1973 (Saturday) ==
- The 1973 Alpine Skiing World Cup concluded at Heavenly Valley in the United States. The men's and women's overall champions were Gustav Thöni of Italy and Annemarie Pröll of Austria, respectively.
- The All England Badminton Championships came to an end at Wembley Arena in London. The men's singles was won by Rudy Hartono and the women's singles by Margaret Beck.
- The 591st and final episode of the Lassie TV series was aired in syndication, after the beloved collie had gone through multiple owners in over 19 consecutive seasons in various scenarios. On September 12, 1954, the show had premiered on CBS with Tommy Rettig ("Jeff") as his first owner, followed by Jon Provost (Timmy) in 1957, a succession of U.S. Forestry Service rangers from 1964 to 1969, two seasons on her own until 1971, and two seasons at a ranch.
- At the age of 26, professional wrestling favorite André the Giant (André Roussimoff) of France made his debut in the United States after being signed by Vincent J. McMahon to the World Wide Wrestling Federation. Billed at 7 ft 4 in (224 cm) and 520 pounds (240 kg), André was introduced in Philadelphia against two challengers, Frank Valois & Bull Pometti, and then appeared at Madison Square Garden in New York City two days later.
- Pink Floyd's The Dark Side of the Moon was released in the UK.
- Born: Jim Parsons, American TV comedian known for portraying Sheldon Cooper on The Big Bang Theory; in Houston

== March 25, 1973 (Sunday) ==
- United States Treasury Secretary George Shultz assembled a forum for the representatives of several of the capitalist world's major industrialized countries, convening an informal gathering of the finance ministers from West Germany (Helmut Schmidt), France (Valéry Giscard d'Estaing), and the United Kingdom (Anthony Barber) at the library in the White House in a forerunner of what would become the "Group of Seven" or "G7" with the addition of Japan, Italy and Canada.
- The first capture by terrorists of a nuclear power plant took place in Argentina when members of the Ejército Revolucionario del Pueblo ("People's Revolutionary Army") took over the Atucha Nuclear Power Plant 60 miles (97 km) from Buenos Aires. The guerrillas declined to hold on to the nuclear reactor or its materials, choosing instead to take some weapons from the guards and departing.
- Less than two months after the signing of the Paris Peace Accords, the North Vietnamese Army began the Battle of Tong Le Chon against the 92nd Ranger Battalion of South Vietnam, a siege of the Tonle Cham Camp in South Vietnam's Binh Phuoc province. The Rangers would defend the camp for more than a year before abandoning it on April 12, 1974, after which South Vietnam's provinces would gradually fall under Communist control.
- Voting took place in Portugal's overseas colonies for legislative assemblies that would provide limited internal government, with the oversight of the Portuguese government. Elections took place in Angola, Mozambique, Portuguese Guinea, São Tomé e Príncipe, Timor and Macao as part of the government's "evolução sem revolução" ("evolution without revolution") program.
- The Republic of Ireland's first tabloid newspaper, Sunday World, began publication as its inaugural issue reached newsstands in and around Dublin. Typifying its format of sensational headlines and provocative news stories, Sunday World had as its lead story a British Army search in Northern Ireland for two women who had lured soldiers to their deaths, with the headline "DRAGNET FOR SPIDER GIRLS".
- A group of five Israelis— two Jewish and three Arab— were convicted by an Israeli court in Haifa of organizing and leading a spy ring for Syria with a goal of overthrowing Israel's government. Former paratrooper Ehud Yadiv and school teacher Dan Vered became the first "Sabras" (native-born Israeli Jews) to be convicted of spying against their own country.
- The Immaculata University Mighty Macs of West Chester, Pennsylvania repeated as champions of U.S. women's college basketball championship in the second AIAW women's basketball tournament, winning 59 to 52 over the Queens College Lady Knights, hosts of the tournament in the Queens borough of New York City.
- The pilot episode of the sitcom Open All Hours (which would later be voted 8th-best in the Britain's Best Sitcom poll), was broadcast on BBC2.
- Chicago ran its electric trolleybus service for the last time as the Chicago Transit Authority retired the last of its "trolley coaches" that had run from overhead electrical wires.
- Born: Si Thu Lwin, popular Myanmar (Burma) recording artist and actor; in Rangoon, Burma (now Yangon, Myanmar)
- Died:
  - Alexander Orlov, 94, former colonel in the Soviet Union's NKVD secret police agency who defected to the United States with his family rather than return to the Soviet Union after being recalled. After the death of Joseph Stalin in 1953, he published his memoir The Secret History of Stalin's Crimes.
  - Edward Steichen, 93, Luxembourg-born American photographer

== March 26, 1973 (Monday) ==
- Women were admitted into the London Stock Exchange for the first time.
- The UCLA Bruins won the NCAA basketball championship with an 87 to 66 score against Memphis State University in St. Louis. Bill Walton of the Bruins scored 44 points by hitting all but one of his shooting attempts, and setting a new record. The victory was UCLA's 75th in a row in regular season and playoff play, and gave Coach John Wooden his ninth title in 10 years.
- The long-running daytime soap opera The Young and the Restless premiered on the CBS television network in the U.S., described as involving "the intertwining fortunes of two families in a small city in upper Mid-America, Genoa City". A critic observed the show as "a complicated mix of traditional soaper fare ('I'm not a child anymore— I'm a woman!') and clever innovations (simultaneous development of several characters' lives, and unprecedented use of popular and even classical music) that could make the series a classic of its kind."

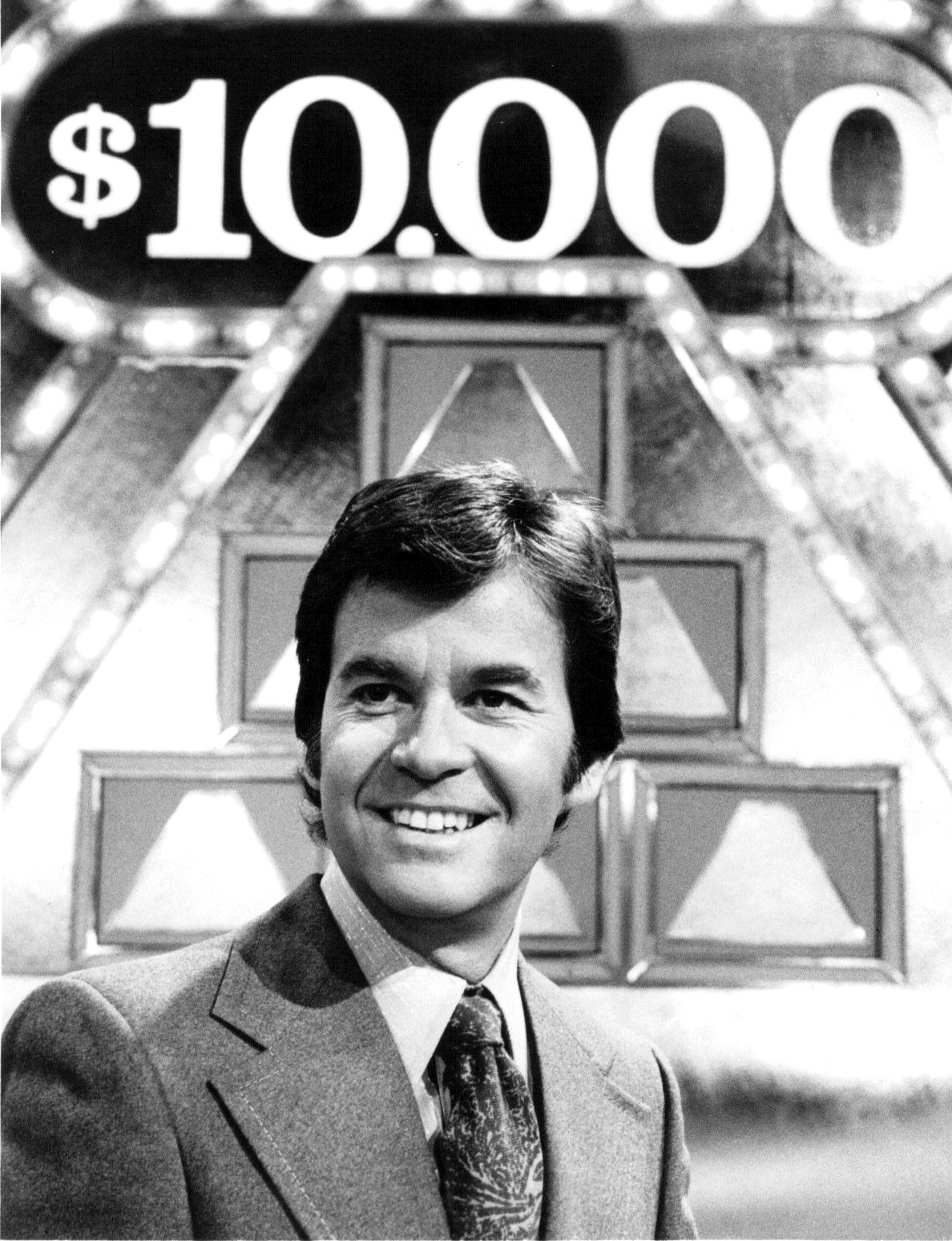
Dick Clark on The $10,000 Pyramid

- On the same day, The $10,000 Pyramid, a game show, made its debut. Dick Clark hosted, and the first celebrity guests were Rob Reiner and June Lockhart.
- The government of South Vietnam released one of its most well-known political prisoners, former presidential candidate Truong Dinh Dzu, who had been incarcerated for more than five years after running in the 1967 presidential election on a platform of negotiating for peace with the Communist Viet Cong.
- Born: Larry Page, U.S. computer scientist and entrepreneur; in Lansing, Michigan
- Died: Noël Coward, 73, English playwright, composer, director, actor and singer

== March 27, 1973 (Tuesday) ==
- At the Academy Awards, The Godfather won Best Picture, while Cabaret won 8 Oscars on the night. Marlon Brando was voted the Academy Award for Best Actor by his peers for his performance as the title character, Vito Corleone, but declined to accept the award as a protest against the depiction of American Indians in U.S. films. Sacheen Littlefeather, an activist for Native American civil rights and actress claiming (later disproven) White Mountain Apache descent, gave the rejection speech on Brando's behalf.
- Canada's Welland By-Pass, a 8.3 miles (13.4 km) long canal between Port Robinson and Port Colborne, Ontario, opened to ship traffic, with the Canadian Coast Guard icebreaker CCGS Griffon being the first to traverse the waterway.
- The flying of airliners at supersonic speed over the United States was barred by the Federal Aviation Administration (FAA), effective April 27, three years after the proposed new regulations were first published for notice and comment.
- Died: Mikhail Kalatozov, Soviet Georgian film director, 69

== March 28, 1973 (Wednesday) ==
- The final stage of repatriation of 591 American prisoners of war in the Vietnam War with the final 148 being prepared for liberation. A group of 81 departed from Hanoi on C-141 Starlifter hospital jets to Clark Air Base in the Philippines. Ernest C. Brace, a civilian who had been the longest held POW, was among those freed, after almost eight years of captivity since his capture on May 21, 1965.
- Prime Minister of France Pierre Messmer and his 22-member cabinet gave their resignations to President Georges Pompidou in order to make way for a new cabinet to carry out social reforms. President Pompidou accepted the resignations but asked Messmer to stay on as prime minister.
- Residents of the Bulgarian village of Kornitsa, most of them Muslims of Turkish descent, fought against members of the Bulgarian Army and a militia who had come to enforce a new government policy of forcing Muslims to abandon their traditions and to change their names to Bulgarian equivalents. Residents of the villages of Lazhnitsa and Breznitsa attempted to march to Kornitsa, and all three villages were placed under martial law.
- The original 7-year term of president of Turkey Cevdet Sunay expired with no successor having been elected. Turkish political leaders agreed to extend Sunay's term for as much as two years or until a successor could be picked. The lower house of parliament voted down the proposal despite a warning from the Turkish military commander to approve the extension or face a takeover of the government. The deadlock in parliament ended when Fahri Korutürk was picked on April 6 on the 15th ballot.
- The Danish Maritime Safety Administration was established.
- Born: Eddie Fatu, American professional wrestler best known by the ring name "Umaga" in World Wrestling Entertainment (died from a heart attack in 2009).
- Died:
  - Gertrude Johnson, 78, Australian opera soprano and founder of the National Theatre, Melbourne
  - Sybil Irving, 76, Australian Army officer and first director of the Australian Women's Army Service (AWAS)
  - Cecil Roy Richards, 79, Australian World War One flying ace with 12 shootdowns
  - Henry E. Stebbins, 67, U.S. diplomat and former U.S. Ambassador to Nepal, disappeared after apparently falling off of the cruise ship S.S. Leonardo da Vinci, and was presumed dead.

== March 29, 1973 (Thursday) ==
- The last American combat troops departed from South Vietnam, with U.S. Army General Frederick C. Weyand and South Vietnam's General Cao Văn Viên, chief of the general staff, presiding over the farewell ceremony with a review of departing U.S. soldiers at the Tan Son Nhut Air Base. General Weyand said "Our mission has been accomplished," and General Cao told the departing troops, "We are going to do everything we can to see that your great sacrifices were not in vain."
- The last group of United States POWs from the military left Vietnam, with 67 being turned over to U.S. authorities. The 589th and last prisoner to board the final airplane out was U.S. Navy Lieutenant Commander Alfred H. Agnew. On April 1, Captain Robert Thomas White of the U.S. Army and two civilians would be set free.
- U.S. President Nixon, under his authority in the "Phase III" economic controls granted to him by law, set a maximum for prices that can be charged by wholesalers and retailers for beef, pork and lamb, in response to threats of a boycott by housewives against the purchase of meat. The order took effect upon being issued at 3:00 in the afternoon Washington time.
- Joe Cahill, sought by Ireland and the UK as the leader of the Provisional Irish Republican Army terrorist group, was arrested by the Irish Navy when he arrived in the port of Waterford, aboard the Claudia, a ship from Libya loaded with five tons of weapons.
- Sicilian mafioso Leonardo Vitale turned himself in at a police station in Palermo to become an informant, and gave prosecutors enough information to indict 28 defendants, most of whom would be acquitted of charges. Vitale would be shot to death in a drive-by shooting in 1984.
- The Emmy Award-winning TV drama Pueblo based on the 1968 capture of the USS Pueblo and its crew, was telecast by the ABC network in the U.S., with Hal Holbrook starring as Captain Lloyd M. Bucher.
- Born:
  - Juan Alejandro Ávila, Mexican and American television actor known for La rosa de Guadalupe; in Mexico City
- Died:
  - Buron Fitts, 78, American politician who had served as Lieutenant Governor of California, as well as a prosecutor who survived a 1937 assassination attempt, committed suicide.
  - Lump, 16, Spanish dog who was constant companion to artist Pablo Picasso and sometimes depicted in Picasso's work, died 10 days before Picasso's April 8 passing.

== March 30, 1973 (Friday) ==
- Bonnie Tiburzi became the first female pilot for a major U.S. airline when she was hired by American Airlines.
- Born: Adam Goldstein (DJ AM), American DJ, record producer and musician; in Philadelphia (d. 2009)
- Died:
  - William Kroll, 83, Luxembourg-born metallurgist who invented (in 1940) the Kroll process for extracting titanium from ore and later developed a process to make possible the manufacture of zirconium.
  - Sidney Farber, 69, American pediatric pathologist who developed modern chemotherapy treatment for leukemia and other cancers, then raised millions of dollars for cancer research.

== March 31, 1973 (Saturday) ==
- Red Rum won the Grand National steeplechase at Aintree, near Liverpool, UK defeating co-favourite Crisp on the run-in, having trailed by 15 lengths at the final fence.
- Former heavyweight boxing champion Muhammad Ali and future heavyweight champ Ken Norton fought the first of three bouts against each other, with Ali sustaining a broken jaw in the second round and continuing to go the distance for the full 15 rounds. Norton won in a split decision by the judges, giving Ali only his second loss in his professional boxing career up to that time.
- Seven people were killed in an explosion at a restaurant in Cincinnati, Ohio, and 19 injured, after the blast caused two buildings to collapse. All of the dead were in a three-story building that housed Clara and Al's Cafe at 1535 Elm Street.
- An F4 tornado struck Abbeville, South Carolina and killed seven people.
- A woman in the U.S. city of Cincinnati, Ohio, gave birth to two babies who were not twins, though they had the same biological parents. The unidentified woman had a rare condition of "two uteri, two mouths to the womb and two cervices", only the second time in recorded medical history that such an event had occurred.
- Died: C. A. Lejeune (Caroline Alice Lejeune), 76, British film critic for The Observer of London as one of the first major female critics.
