= Anatoly Utkin =

Soviet serial killer

- Born: Anatoly Viktorovich Utkin; 1943; Ulyanovsk, Ulyanovsk Oblast, RSFSR
- Died: 12 September 1975 (aged 31–32); RSFSR
- Cause of death: Execution by shooting
- Other name: "The Ulyanovsky Maniac"
- Convictions: Attempted murder Murder; Robbery
- Penalty: Death

Details
- Victims: 9
- Span of crimes: 1968–1973
- Country: Soviet Union
- State: Ulyanovsk
- Date apprehended: 9 February 1973

Anatoly Viktorovich Utkin (Russian: Анато́лий Ви́кторович У́ткин; 1943 – 12 September 1975) was a Soviet serial killer, convicted for the killing of nine people in Ulyanovsk Oblast and Penza Oblast between 1968 and 1973.

== Background ==
Utkin was born in 1943, while his father Viktor was serving in World War II. When his father found his future mother pregnant, he thought that she had committed adultery and abandoned the future child. Utkin's mother attempted to get rid of him while pregnant, but she failed. Despite this background, Utkin experienced nothing special during his early years. He attended a vocational school and worked as a driver for the Soviet Army.

== Murders ==
On 31 March 1968, Utkin committed his first murder in Barysh, Ulyanovsk Oblast, when he killed a 14-year-old girl and stole her watch. The body of the girl was found two months later, 300 kilometres from where she was killed. Three months later, on 27 June, Utkin raped and killed a 17-year-old girl, and on 25 September, killed a 13-year-old in Penza Oblast. On 8 October, Utkin attempted to kill another girl, but she fought him off and survived. On 28 November, Utkin killed a 10-year-old girl in Ulyanovsk, taking her left sock, and on 28 May 1969, he killed another woman in the city. In August 1969, Utkin was convicted of robbery and sentenced to three years in prison.

Utkin was released from prison in October 1972 and shortly afterwards attempted to rape and murder a woman in Barysh, but the victim managed to escape. On 6 December, Utkin killed his only male victim, stealing his money and dumping the body in a ditch. On 15 December, Utkin killed a woman who hitchhiked with him from an airport in Ulyanovsk.

== Arrest and conviction ==
On 8 February 1973, Utkin attempted to commit a robbery at a textile factory, killing a cashier in the process. After failing to open the safe containing the worker's salaries using the cashier's keys, he set fire to the building with a bucket of diesel fuel. Utkin accidentally left behind the metal bucket that had his name stamped on it, and it was discovered the next day by the police investigating the fire. Utkin was arrested at his home by Inspector Anwar Melnikov, where he attempted to resist arrest and was taken into custody. In 1974, Utkin was charged with nine murders, theft, and robbery. Judge Vitaly Shorin found Utkin guilty on all counts and sentenced him to death.

On 12 September 1975, Utkin was executed.

== See also ==
- List of Russian serial killers
