= Pedro Pablo Nakada Ludeña =

Peruvian serial killer

- Born: Pedro Pablo Mesías Ludeña; February 28, 1973 (age 53); Lima, Peru
- Other name: The Apostle of Death
- Conviction: Murder (x17)
- Penalty: 35 years imprisonment

Details
- Victims: 17–25
- Span of crimes: January 1, 2005 – December 27, 2006
- Country: Peru
- Date apprehended: December 28, 2006

Pedro Pablo Nakada Ludeña (born February 28, 1973) a.k.a. "El Apóstol de la Muerte" ("The Apostle of Death") is a Peruvian serial killer who claimed 25 victims and was convicted of 17 murders. He was sentenced to 35 years in prison.

== Early life ==
Nakada was born Pedro Pablo Mesías Ludeña on February 28, 1973, in Lima, Peru. Nakada's biological father was an alcoholic and his mother had an unspecified mental disorder. As a child, Nakada was submissive and often abused by his siblings. He was devastated when his father died at a young age, as he would defend him from the mockery of his sisters and their friends, who would make Nakada dress like a girl. He also claimed to have been raped by his brothers after they thought that he had killed their pregnant dog. He blamed this incident for his hatred of homosexuals. Nakada claims to have tortured animals as a child.

In 2003, Nakada paid a Japanese citizen 800 Peruvian soles to adopt him as an adult, hoping that this could help him migrate to Japan as a Japanese descendant, and changed his paternal surname from Mesías to the Japanese Nakada accordingly. This tactic is commonly used by Peruvian criminals as a way to flee local justice. Though Nakada never moved to Japan, his younger brother Vayron Jonathan Nakada Ludeña did and was arrested there in 2015, following a three-day killing spree in which he fatally stabbed six people. Nakada's family claims that both brothers are paranoid schizophrenics.

== Murders and arrest ==
Nakada killed his victims with 9mm pistols fitted with his own handmade rubber silencers modified from slippers. His claimed motive was that he had been commanded by God to cleanse the Earth by eliminating drug addicts, prostitutes, homosexuals, and criminals.

Nakada was arrested on December 28, 2006, after a shootout with the police inside his workplace. One officer was injured in the shooting. Though he confessed to have killed 25 people, he was convicted of 17 murders only, and was sentenced to a maximum prison term of 35 years.

== Victims ==
All of Nakada's victims

Number	Name	Sex	Age	Date of Murder	Details	Reason
1	Carlos Edilberto Merino Aguilar	M	26	January 1, 2005	He was shot through the thorax and abdomen. Also stole money from him afterwards.	He believed he was going to rob him.
2	Teresa Cotrina Abad	F	50	May 31, 2006	She was shot twice in the head and died from perforating head trauma.	Because he saw her smoking cigarettes.
3	Walter Sandoval Osorio	M	44	July 20, 2006	He was shot once in the head. Sandoval made it to a hospital, but he died from his injury shortly after.	He was a criminal.
4	Gerardo Leonardo Cruz Libya	M	30	August 8, 2006 (date of discovery)	Died of severe head trauma from a gunshot wound to the head. He was also submerged in the bottom of a water well.	To prevent him from betraying him for a previous crime of robbery and murder they perpetuated which involved killing a man and stealing his car. Nakada wanted to leave the business and killed Cruz when he urged Nakada not to.
5	Carlos Walter Tarazona Toledo	M	21	August 18, 2006 (date of discovery)	Died from a severe injury caused by a firearm.	He was smoking drugs.
6	María Verónica Tolentino Pajuelo	F	15	August 19, 2006 (date of discovery)	Shot twice, once in the head. Nakada confirmed she was his only victim who didn't deserve to die and felt horrible for killing her.	Nakada went to kill fumones ("potheads") at Santa Rosa and shot Tolentino when she approached. He killed her for her bicycle (which he discovered had a broken tire) and lamented killing her, but believed it was collateral damage for a good purpose.
7	Hugo Vílchez Palomino	M	Unknown	November 18, 2006 (date of discovery)	Shot; was also robbed of a Baikal gun, a cell phone, and a Sony discman.	Killed because he wanted to sleep with his wife.
8	Luis Enrique Morán Cervantes	M	32	November 22, 2006 (date of discover)	Unknown; stole his taxi after killing him and the two victims below.	He believed the three of them were using their taxi for assaults.
9	Pedro Omar Carrera Carrera	M	24	November 22, 2006	Unknown	He believed the three of them were using their taxi for assaults.
10	Enoch Eliseo Félix Zorrilla	M	22	November 22, 2006	Unknown	He believed the three of them were using their taxi for assaults.
11	Widmar Jesús Muñoz Villanueva	M	42	November 19, 2006	Was also a cosmetologist; Nakada heard rumors of Muñoz and his activities, so he went to the Giusella hairdresser Muñoz worked at. He pretended to solicit sexual services from him and shot him three times in the neck when Muñoz dropped his pants. Nakada also stole $541 worth of soles afterwards.	Killed for being a homosexual and prostitution (which caused deaths because he had AIDS).
12	Nell Cajaleón Pajuelo	M	Unknown	December 10, 2006	Shot in the head and threw his body 200 meters.	Killed for his bike.
13	Nazario Julián Tamariz Pérez	M	Unknown	Unknown	Unknown; stole their shoes and money (all worth $36) afterwards.	Killed for being homosexual and for making love at an irrigation canal.
14	Didier Jesús Zapata Dulanto	M	Unknown	Unknown	Unknown; stole their shoes and money (all worth $36) afterwards.	Killed for being homosexual and for making love at an irrigation canal.
15	Agustín Andrés Maguiña Oropeza	M	46	December 24, 2006	Shot once in the head	Killed because they were both alcoholics and they witnessed a previous crime.
16	Luis Melgarejo Sáenz	M	54	December 24, 2006	Shot once in the head	Killed because they were both alcoholics and they witnessed a previous crime.
17	Nicolás Tolentino Purizaca Gamboa	M	Unknown	December 27, 2006	Shot once in the head. Police tried to save him, but were unsuccessful.	He smoked drugs and had robbed Nakada and several others.

== See also ==
- List of serial killers by country
- List of serial killers by number of victims
