= Ekin Airbuggy =

WHE Airbuggy

General information
- Type: Light autogyro
- National origin: United Kingdom
- Manufacturer: W. H. Ekin (Engineering) Company

History
- Introduction date: 1975
- First flight: 1 February 1973
- Developed from: McCandless M-4 Gyroplane

The Ekin WHE Airbuggy is a British single-seat autogyro designed and built by the W. H. Ekin (Engineering) Company in Northern Ireland.

== Development ==
The company was formed in 1969 to manufacturer six McCandless M-4 Gyroplanes under licence. The company improved the design to produce the Airbuggy which was first flown on 1 February 1973. It was a conventional single-seat autogyro with a rear-mounted 75 hp (56 kW) Volkswagen flat-four motor car engine. It had a fixed tricycle landing gear with an open cockpit in a nacelle forward of the rotor pylon. The first Airbuggy was delivered in December 1975.

== Specifications ==
Data from Jane's all the world's aircraft, 1975-76

General characteristics

- Crew: 1
- Length: 11 ft 6 in (3.51 m)
- Height: 7 ft 3 in (2.21 m)
- Empty weight: 355 lb (161 kg)
- Max takeoff weight: 650 lb (295 kg)
- Powerplant: 1 × 1600-1800cc Volkswagen air cooled engine 4-cyl. air-cooled horizontally-opposed piston engine, 75 hp (56 kW)
- Main rotor diameter: 21 ft 9 in (6.63 m)
- Main rotor area: 405.0 sq ft (37.63 m^{2})
- Propellers: 2-bladed Hoffman pusher propeller, 4 ft 9 in (1.45 m) diameter

Performance

- Maximum speed: 69 kn (80 mph, 128 km/h)
- Cruise speed: 52 kn (60 mph, 97 km/h)
- Never exceed speed: 69 kn (80 mph, 128 km/h)
- Range: 121 nmi (140 mi, 225 km)
- Rate of climb: 1,000.6 ft/min (5.083 m/s)
- Disk loading: 1.7 lb/sq ft (8.5 kg/m^{2})
- Power/mass: 0.188 kW/kg (0.115 hp/lb)

== See also ==
Aircraft of comparable role, configuration, and era

- Campbell Cricket

Related lists

- List of autogyro models
