= Abu Saleh =

Senior financier for the Islamic State

Muwaffaq Mustafa Mohammed al-Karmoush
- موفق مصطفى محمد الكرموش
- Born: 1 February 1973; Iraq
- Died: November 2015 (aged 42); Iraq
- Cause of death: Airstrike
- Other name: Abu Saleh al-Afri
- Citizenship: Iraqi
- Organization: Islamic State

Muwaffaq Mustafa Mohammed al-Karmoush (1 February 1973 – November 2015), known by his kunya Abu Saleh al-Afri, was an Iraqi man and senior financier for the Islamic State.

== History ==
Abu Saleh was born on 1 February 1973 in Iraq.

=== Sanctions ===
Abu Saleh was sanctioned on 29 September 2015 by the United States Department of the Treasury. According to the US Treasury, he "supervised ISIL's financial affairs, including salary payments. He previously oversaw ISIL’s military financial affairs and served as one of AQI’s financial chiefs."

== Death ==
Abu Saleh was reported killed in an American airstrike on 10 December 2015. The date of the airstrike was described as "within recent weeks." Other reports said the strike took place in November 2015.

Col. Steve Warren of the US Army, formerly the American military spokesman in Baghdad, described him as "one of the most senior and experienced members of ISIL’s financial network" and "a legacy Al-Qaeda member".

Col. Warren further called Abu Salah "one of the most senior and experienced members" of the militant group's financial network. "Killing him and his predecessors exhausts the knowledge and talent needed to co-ordinate funding within the organisation," Col Warren said.
