= January 1973 =

Month of 1973

<<	January 1973					>>
Su	Mo	Tu	We	Th	Fr	Sa
	1	2	3	4	5	6
7	8	9	10	11	12	13
14	15	16	17	18	19	20
21	22	23	24	25	26	27
28	29	30	31

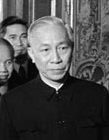
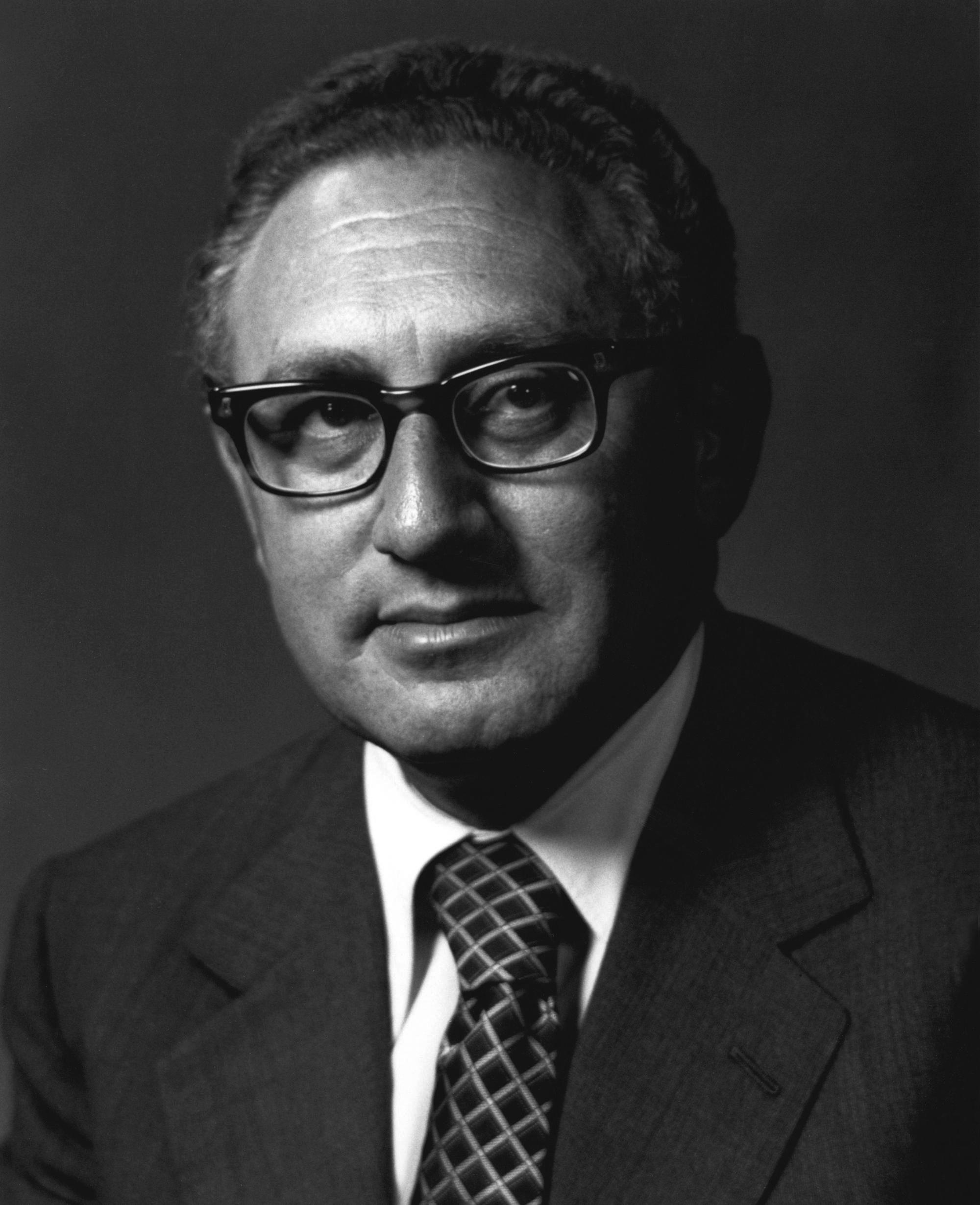
January 23, 1973: Lê Đức Thọ of North Vietnam and Henry Kissinger of the U.S. reach agreement on ending the Vietnam War

North Vietnam

Viet Cong

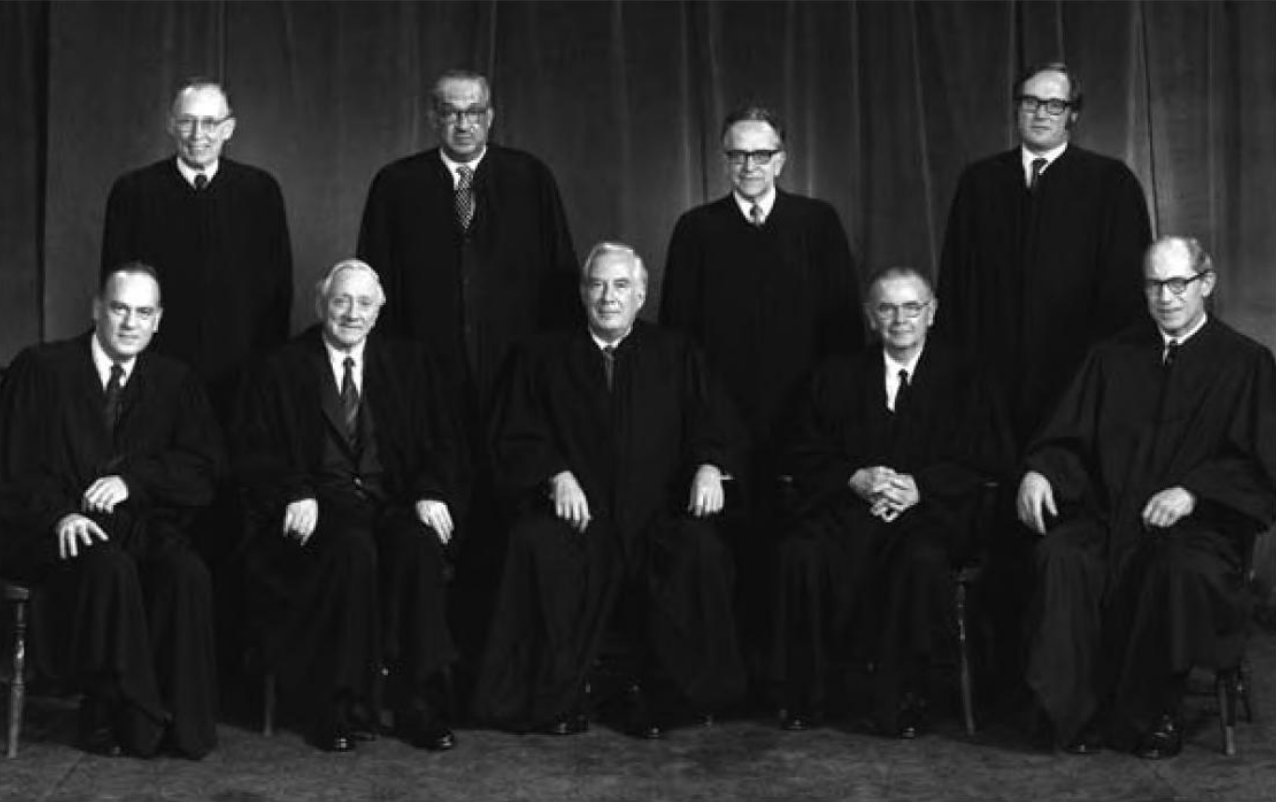
January 22, 1973: U.S. Supreme Court ends individual state bans on abortion of pregnancy in 7 to 2 decision in Roe v. Wade

South Vietnam

United States

The following events occurred in January 1973:

== January 1, 1973 (Monday) ==
- The United Kingdom, Ireland and Denmark entered the 'European Economic Community (EEC, generally referred to as "the Common Market", a predecessor to the European Union. The addition of the new members brought the number of Common Market nations from six to nine.
- Exxon Corporation, the largest oil company in the world at the time, was created by the merger of Standard Oil Company of New Jersey and Humble Oil. The gasoline stations of the merged companies, operating under the names Esso, Enco and Humble, would all be rebranded as Exxon stations during the year 1973.
- In the 59th Rose Bowl college football game, the #1-ranked USC Trojans of the Pacific 8 conference defeated the #3-ranked Ohio State Buckeyes of the Big Ten conference, 42–17. The #2-ranked team, the Oklahoma Sooners, had beaten the #5-ranked Penn State Nittany Lions the night before in the Sugar Bowl. The University of Southern California team, unbeaten and untied in 12 starts, would be voted #1 in both the Associated Press and United Press International polls, gaining recognition by the NCAA in the era before playoffs as the unofficial national champion of American college football.
- Hitachi SC and Yanmar Diesel SC, who had finished 1st and 2nd in regular play in the Japan Soccer League, met in the championship game of the 24-team playoff, the Emperor's Cup. Hitachi won, 2 to 1.
- A new constitution went into effect in the southern African nation of Zambia, declaring the republic to be a "one-party participatory democracy", with the lone political organization being the ruling United National Independence Party (UNIP) of President Kenneth Kaunda. Zambia continued as a one-party participatory democracy until becoming "a unitary, indivisible, multi-party and democratic sovereign state" when a new constitution would take effect in 1991.
- The west African nation of Nigeria, the last on earth to use the non-decimal "£sd" system of "pounds, shillings and pence", introduced a new currency, the naira (₦) to replace the Nigerian pound that had been used since independence, at the rate of £1 = ₦2. Under the new decimal system, one naira was worth 100 kobo.
- The University of Passau was established in West Germany's state of Bavaria in the city of Passau on the German-Austrian border.
- Born:
  - Juan Gabriel Vásquez, Colombian novelist, in Bogotá
  - Jimi Mistry, English film and TV actor known for EastEnders and Coronation Street; in Scarborough, North Yorkshire
  - Rabaki Jérémie Ouédraogo, Burkina Faso road cycling champion; in Kokologo, Republic of Upper Volta
- Died:
  - Ilse Barea-Kulcsar, 70, Austrian journalist, novelist, translator, teacher, communist political activist, anti-fascist activist and resistance fighter who campaigned in Austria, volunteered in the Spanish Civil War and went into exile in Britain.
  - Sergei Kourdakov, 21, a Soviet Russian KGB agent who had defected to Canada on September 3, 1971, was found dead in his motel room at the ski resort town of Running Springs, California, from a gunshot to the head.
  - Walter E. "Jack" Rollins, 66, American lyricist who wrote the words for more than 500 songs, and was best known for "Frosty the Snowman" (1950) and "Here Comes Peter Cottontail" (1949)
  - Jeffrey Carp, 24, American blues harmonica artist, by drowning
  - Tsuneo Mori, 28, Japanese terrorist and member of the Japanese Red Army until his arrest in 1972, by hanging in his jail cell in Tokyo.

== January 2, 1973 (Tuesday) ==
- The asteroid 11785 Migaic was discovered by N. S. Chernykh at the Crimean Astrophysical Observatory.
- Rafael Hernández Colón began his first term as Governor of Puerto Rico.
- Born: Lucy Davis, English TV actress; in Solihull, West Midlands
- Died:
  - Eleazar López Contreras, 89, President of Venezuela 1935–1941
  - Nirmal Munda, 79, Indian agrarian leader and independence fighter known for leading the Munda agitation from 1937 to 1939 against extortion
  - Speckled Red (stage name for Rufus Perryman), 80, African-American comedian, blues singer and musician known for his recordings of the improvised insult exchanges known as "The Dozens"

== January 3, 1973 (Wednesday) ==
- The 93rd United States Congress opened with the swearing in of new U.S. Representatives and U.S. Senators. The seats of Democratic Representatives Hale Boggs of Louisiana's 2nd district and Nick Begich of Alaska's At-Large district were declared "presumed dead" by House Resolution 1, nearly three months after the plane carrying both Congressmen was lost on October 16, 1972, over a remote region of Alaska. Although both Boggs and Begich won their re-elections while officially missing after the crash, the House resolution renders their seats vacant at the start of the 93rd Congress and orders special elections to fill both seats. Antonio Won Pat became the first delegate from the U.S. territory of Guam to have an office in the U.S. House of Representatives, appearing as the territory's non-voting delegate.
- Daniel Ellsberg, a military analyst for the RAND Corporation who leaked top secret U.S. Department of Defense documents to multiple newspapers, went on trial for violations of the Espionage Act of 1917. The documents, published as the "Pentagon Papers", led to Ellsberg's indictment. Although initially barred from testifying in his own defense, Ellsberg would have the charges against him dismissed on May 11 because of prosecutorial misconduct including the wiretapping of his office and the burglary of his psychiatrist's office.
- CBS, the Columbia Broadcasting System sold the New York Yankees baseball team for $10 million to a 12-person syndicate led by George Steinbrenner, with Robert Nederlander, E. Michael Burke, Lester Crown, John DeLorean, Nelson Bunker Hunt and Marvin L. Warner as junior partners. The price was $3.2 million more than the price paid by CBS for the team in 1965.
- Ferdinand Marcos, the President of the Philippines, hosted a conference at the Malacañang Palace in Manila of 300 Muslim leaders from Mindanao in an effort to stopping the secessionist movement on that island.
- The Golden Corral chain of steak restaurants opened its first of almost 500 locations in the United States, starting with a steakhouse in Fayetteville, North Carolina.
- U.S. Air Force General John C. Meyer, Commander-in-Chief of the Strategic Air Command, was booed by airmen at the Andersen Air Force Base in Guam, where he had paid a visit days after directing Operation Linebacker II, the "Christmas Bombing" that took place from December 18 to December 29, 1972.
- Born: Dan Harmon, American TV producer known for Community and for Rick and Morty; in Milwaukee
- Died:
  - Howard R. Davies, 77, British motorcycle racer and designer who founded HRD Motors Ltd
  - Christopher Chenery, 86, American engineer, businessman and racehorse owner whose thoroughbred Secretariat would win the U.S. Triple Crown of Horse Racing later in the year
  - Christine van Meeteren, 87, Dutch silent film actress

== January 4, 1973 (Thursday) ==
- The 29th Canadian Parliament opened its session with the swearing in of 264 members of the Canadian House of Commons and 102 Senators. The Liberal government of Prime Minister Pierre Trudeau had only a 109 to 107 lead in Commons over the Progressive Conservative opposition, with other parties dividing the remaining 48 seats.
- In Derry in Northern Ireland, a crowd of almost 300 children threw stones and bottles at six British Army soldiers who had come to a Roman Catholic neighborhood to investigate a complaint. Four soldiers were hurt before the patrol commander fired a rifle shot over the heads of the children.
- Australia's new Minister for Immigration, Al Grassby, announced that the nation had officially ended what critics had called the "white Australia policy", eliminating the use of skin color as a factor in determining whether to admit immigrants, and specifically lifting the quota on nonwhites. The phasing out of the policy had started after World War II, when Australia admitted a few nonwhites as immigrants and then permitted them to become citizens after 15 years residence. In 1966, the residence requirement was reduced to five years.
- The pilot episode of the longest-running TV comedy series in the world, Last of the Summer Wine, was broadcast in the United Kingdom as an episode of BBC's Comedy Playhouse. Picked up as a series, Last of the Summer Wine would debut on November 12 and would continue to run for 295 episodes over 37 years, until August 29, 2010.
- An annular solar eclipse took place, visible mostly over Chile and Argentina.
- Born: Laia Marull, Spanish film actress; in Barcelona

== January 5, 1973 (Friday) ==
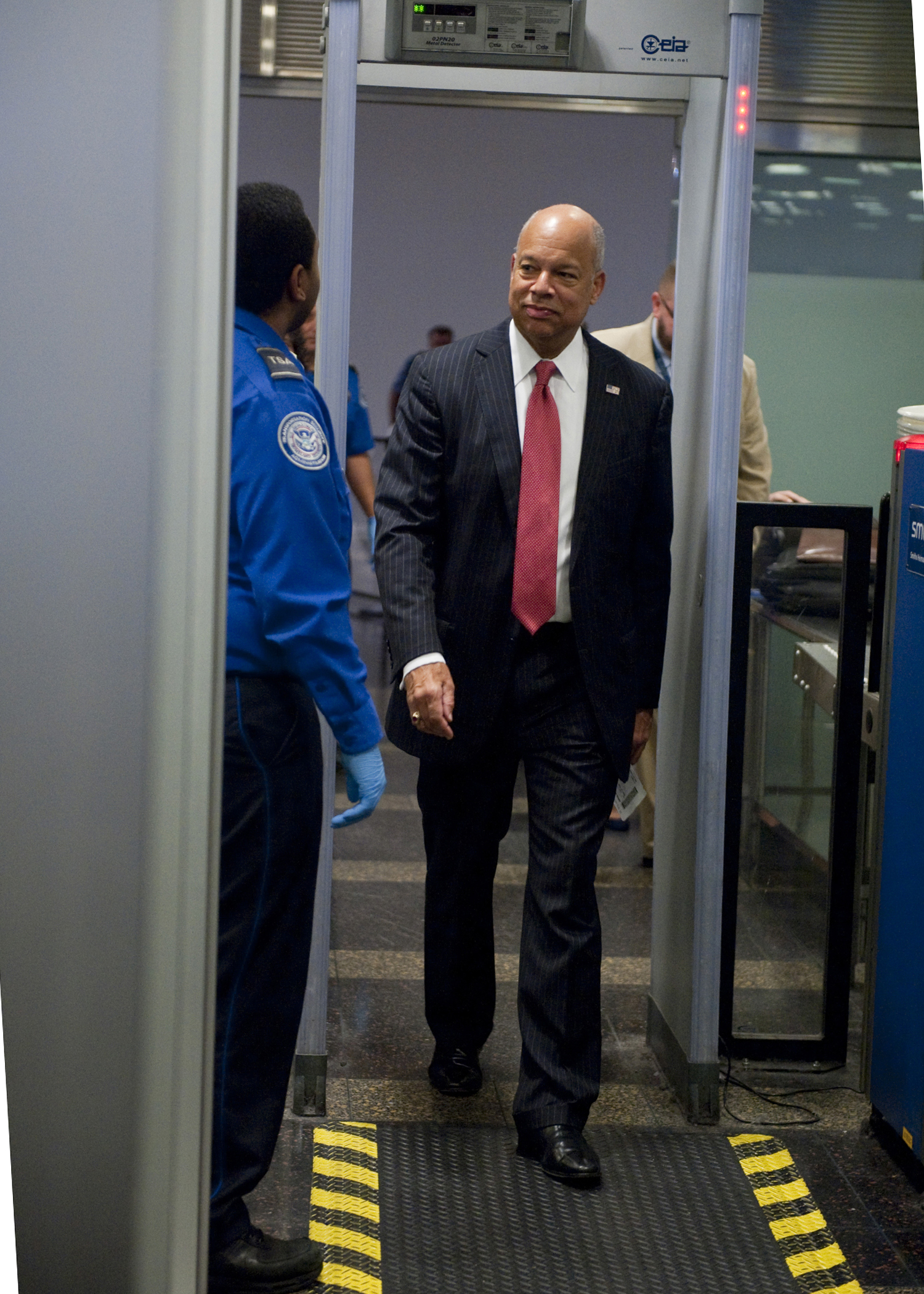
Secretary of Homeland Security Johnson going through a metal detector in 2014

- Mandatory screening before boarding of all airline passengers went into effect in the United States under orders of the U.S. Department of Transportation, after notice and comment was announced on December 5.
- As its first order of business, the members of the Canada's House of Commons, liberal and conservative, voted unanimously to condemn the American Christmas bombing of North Vietnam that was carried out from December 18 to December 29, 1972. The resolution, introduced by Mitchell Sharp, the MP who was Canada's Secretary of State for External Affairs, began with a statement that the House "deplores the recent large-scale bombing in the Hanoi-Haiphong area", and added that the body "requests the government of the United States to refrain from resumption" of the bombing. The move infuriated U.S. President Richard M. Nixon.
- U.S. President Nixon issued an Executive Order to partially put into effect his 1971 proposal for reorganization of the federal government, consolidating much of the authority under three members of his Cabinet whom he elevated to the additional role of "White House Counselor". Caspar Weinberger, whom he had nominated for U.S. Secretary of Health, Education, and Welfare (HEW), was designated as "Counselor for Human Resources" and had "responsibility for health, education, manpower development, income security, social services, Indian and native peoples, drug abuse and consumer protection". James T. Lynn, nominated as U.S. Secretary of Housing and Urban Development (HUD), was designated as "Counselor for Community Development" to handle community institutions, community planning, housing, highways, public transportation, regional development, disaster relief and national capital affairs. Earl Butz, at the time the United States Secretary of Agriculture, was named "Counselor for Natural Resources" in charge of "natural resource use, lands and minerals, environment, outdoor recreation, water control and park and wildlife resources." Many of the named duties were under the authority of agencies not affiliated with any Cabinet-level department. The move was intended to reduce the number of staff in the White House from 4,000 to 2,000.
- NASA announced the cancellation of the NERVA (Nuclear Engine for Rocket Vehicle Application) project, a joint effort of NASA and the U.S. Atomic Energy Commission to develop a nuclear-powered rocket engine for long range space missions. Over 17 years, US$1.4 billion had been spent on the development before U.S. President Nixon canceled the program as a cost-cutting measure.
- Indonesia's four Islamic political parties merged into a single organization, the Partai Persatuan Pembangunan (PPP, United Development Party).
- The Fifth Amendment of the Constitution of Ireland was signed into law after being overwhelmingly approved in a December 7 referendum. The amendment removed references to "the special position of the Holy Catholic Apostolic and Roman Church as the guardian of the Faith" in addition to the honorable mention of the non-Catholic denominations of "the Church of Ireland, the Presbyterian Church in Ireland, the Methodist Church in Ireland, the Religious Society of Friends in Ireland, as well as the Jewish Congregations and the other religious denominations existing in Ireland" in 1937. The fourth amendment, lowering the voting age in national elections from 21 to 18, took effect the same day.
- The American rock band Aerosmith, composed of Boston musicians Steven Tyler, who sang lead vocals, guitarists Joe Perry and Brad Whitford, bassist Tom Hamilton and drummer Joey Kramer, released its debut album of the same name, distributed by Columbia Records.

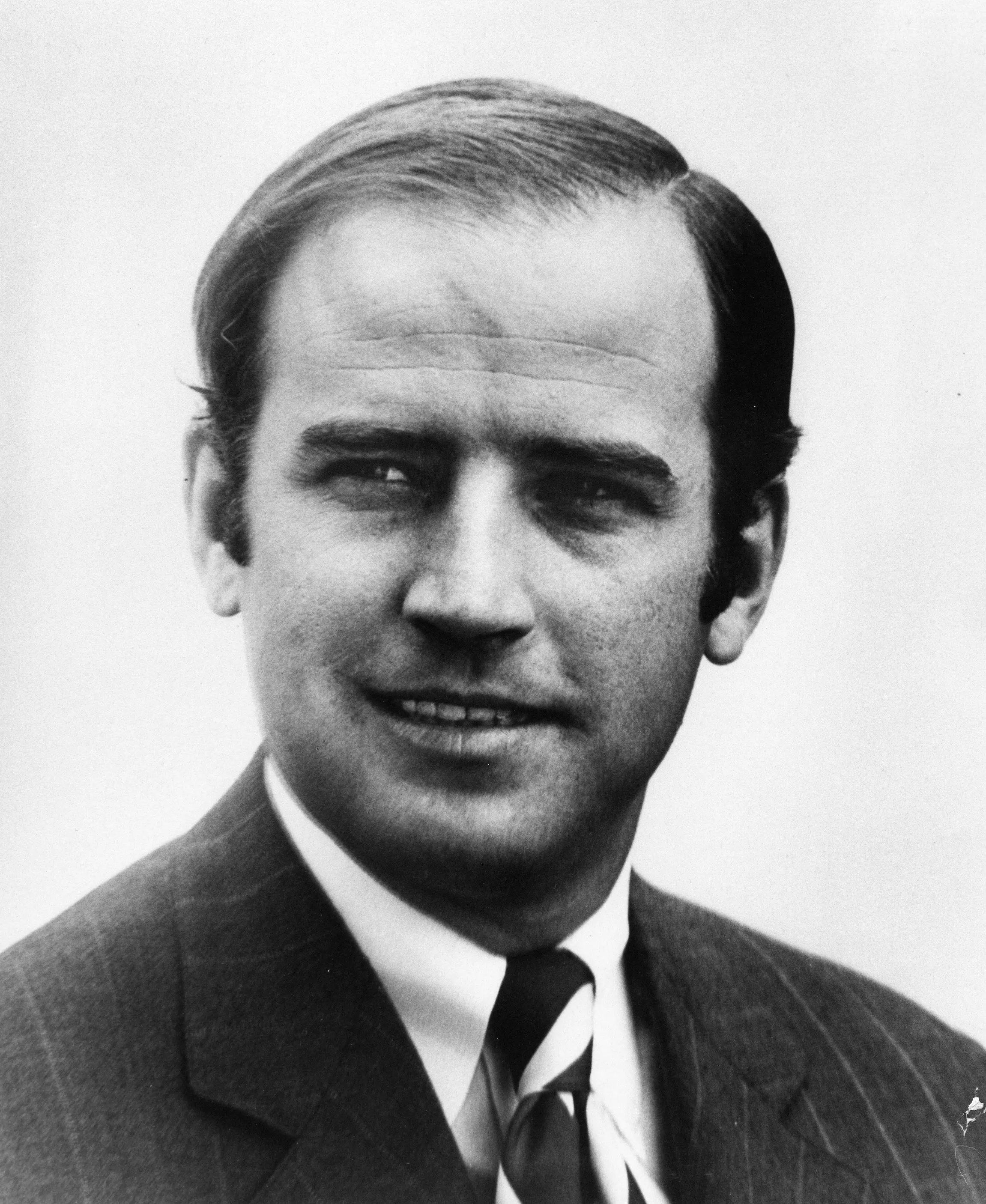
Senator Biden

- Future United States President Joe Biden was sworn in as the junior United States senator from Delaware at a chapel at the Wilmington General Hospital in Wilmington, Delaware, where one of his sons was still hospitalized after a December 18 auto accident that had killed Biden's wife and his daughter.
- Died: Gerald Boland, 87, Irish attorney who served as Minister for Justice 1939 to 1948 and 1941 to 1954, as well as member of the parliament 1923–1961 and senator, 1961–1969

== January 6, 1973 (Saturday) ==
- U.S. President Richard M. Nixon was officially declared the winner of the 1972 United States presidential election with the certification by Vice President Spiro Agnew of the electoral vote. The final result was Nixon, 520 votes; U.S. Senator George McGovern of South Dakota, 17 votes; and John Hospers, a Libertarian candidate, 1 vote, from Virginia "faithless elector" Roger MacBride. Agnew also announced his own re-election, with the vote of 520 for him, 17 for Sargent Shriver and one (from MacBride) for Theodora Nathan, who became the first woman in U.S. history to receive an electoral vote.
- Multiplication Rock, U.S. television cartoon series with three-minute episodes setting the multiplication tables to memorable tunes, made its debut between the regular Saturday morning shows on the ABC network. The first installment, "Three Is a Magic Number", appeared at 8:25 in the morning after H.R. Pufnstuf. Bob Dorough wrote and performed the music and lyrics to most of the songs, with most of the cartoons produced by Phil Kimmelman & Associates.
- The "Ortoli Commission", presided over by François-Xavier Ortoli, took office to govern the European Commission.
- Born: Misa Hylton, American stylist and fashion designer for female musicians; in Mount Vernon, New York
- Died: Maurice H. Thatcher, 102, U.S. Representative for Kentucky from 1923 to 1933, former U.S. Governor of the Canal Zone in Panama (1910–1922) and the oldest surviving former member of Congress.

== January 7, 1973 (Sunday) ==
- After shooting a police officer a week earlier, Mark Essex, a former Black Panther party member, shot 19 people (10 of them police officers) with a sniper rifle from his vantage point at a Howard Johnsons hotel in the U.S. city of New Orleans. His stated motive was "retaliation for police killings" of African-Americans. Essex had killed a black police cadet and fatally wounded a white police officer on New Year's Eve. In a single day, Essex caused the deaths of two hotel guests, two hotel employees, and three additional New Orleans police officers before being shot dead by a police marksman firing from a helicopter.
- Utah became one of the first states of the United States to reinstate capital punishment after the U.S. Supreme Court had struck down the death penalty in all states in its decision on June 29, 1972, in Furman v. Georgia. The replacement law took effect on July 1, 1973, pending approval of the new standards for capital sentences by the high Court. After the July 2, 1976 decision in Gregg v. Georgia, Utah would become the first state to carry out a death sentence, executing Gary Gilmore by firing squad on January 17, 1977.
- The CBS television network became the first U.S. network to broadcast a game of the new World Hockey Association, after having been outbid by the NBC network for the TV rights to National Hockey League for the 1971–72 NHL season. The first game featured the Winnipeg Jets visiting the Minnesota Fighting Saints at St. Paul, Minnesota and winning, 6 to 2.
- The 1973 All-Africa Games, the second in the series, opened for 12 days of competition by 36 nations in Lagos, Nigeria. The first All-Africa Games had been held in the Congo Republic in 1965. Egypt won the most medals (23 gold and 66 overall) with Nigeria second (18 gold, 60 total) and Kenya third (nine gold, 27 total)
- The British Darts Organisation was founded by Olly Croft.
- The anime series Fables of the Green Forest began its run on Japanese television.
- Died: Pedro Berruezo, Spanish soccer football forward for Sevilla FC, suffered a fatal heart attack on the field six minutes into a match against the host team Pontevedra CF.

== January 8, 1973 (Monday) ==
- The Paris Peace Talks to end the Vietnam War came close to failing at an angry meeting in the French town of Gif-sur-Yvette, where U.S. National Security Adviser Henry Kissinger was angrily confronted by North Vietnam's chief negotiator, Lê Đức Thọ, over the Christmas bombing of North Vietnam. Reportedly, Tho shouted at Kissinger in French for more than an hour, loudly enough that reporters outside the conference room could hear him berate the U.S. representative. Nevertheless, a peace agreement would be reached on January 23.
- The Brazilian government kidnapped, from different locations (including Soledad Barrett Viedma), six opponents of the military regime and then murdered them. The bodies were found in a barn in the town of São Bento near the city of Abreu e Lima in the Pernambuco state.
- The Mexican television networks Telesistema Mexicano and Televisión Independiente de México, merged to create a single broadcast network, Televisa (Television Via Satellite).
- Sesamstrasse, the German-language version of the U.S. children's program Sesame Street, premiered on the west German network Norddeutscher Rundfunk (NDR), with German actors dubbing previously broadcast U.S. shows, before a German production could be started on January 2, 1978, with new puppets and sets.
- At 9:55 a.m. Moscow time (0615 UTC), the Soviet Union launched the Luna 21 uncrewed space mission to the Moon, which included the remotely-guided Lunokhod 2 lunar rover.
- In the U.S., the ABC television network introduced its new late-night series, ABC's Wide World of Entertainment, as part of a block of programming after 11:30 pm that rotated between the series and several other programs.
- Born:
  - Irina Slavina (pen name for Irina Murakhtaeva), Russian journalist and government opponent known for her fatal self-immolation as a protest; in Gorky (now Nizhny Novgorod), Russian SFSR, Soviet Union (d. 2020)
  - Ryan Coetzee, South African politician and British political strategist
  - Henning Solberg, Norwegian rally driver; in Askim
  - Donnell Turner, American soap opera actor on General Hospital since 2015; in Tacoma, Washington
- Died:
  - Sam Battaglia, 64, American mobster, in prison
  - Dong Xiwen, 58, Chinese painter known for his painting The Founding Ceremony of the Nation, before being persecuted during the Cultural Revolution, died of cancer.

== January 9, 1973 (Tuesday) ==
- Rhodesia closed its borders with Zambia on the grounds that the Zambians were harboring anti-Rhodesian guerrillas.
- All 42 crew on the Dona Anita, an African freighter, died when the vessel sank off the coast of Vancouver Island.
- Alexander Mackenzie Stuart, Max Sørensen, and Cearbhall Ó Dálaigh became judges at the Court of Justice of the European Communities in Luxembourg. Jean-Pierre Warner joined the Court as Advocate-General.
- Born: Sean Paul, Jamaican rapper; in Kingston

== January 10, 1973 (Wednesday) ==
- A tornado killed 63 people in Argentina in the city of San Justo.
- Five political parties in Indonesia, the Indonesian National Party, the League of Supporters of Indonesian Independence, the Murba Party, the Indonesian Christian Party, and the Catholic Party merged into a single organization, the Indonesian Democratic Party.
- Born:
  - Félix Trinidad, Puerto Rican boxer; in Fajardo, Puerto Rico
  - Ajit Pai, American politician, Chairman of the Federal Communications Commission 2017–2021; in Buffalo, New York

== January 11, 1973 (Thursday) ==
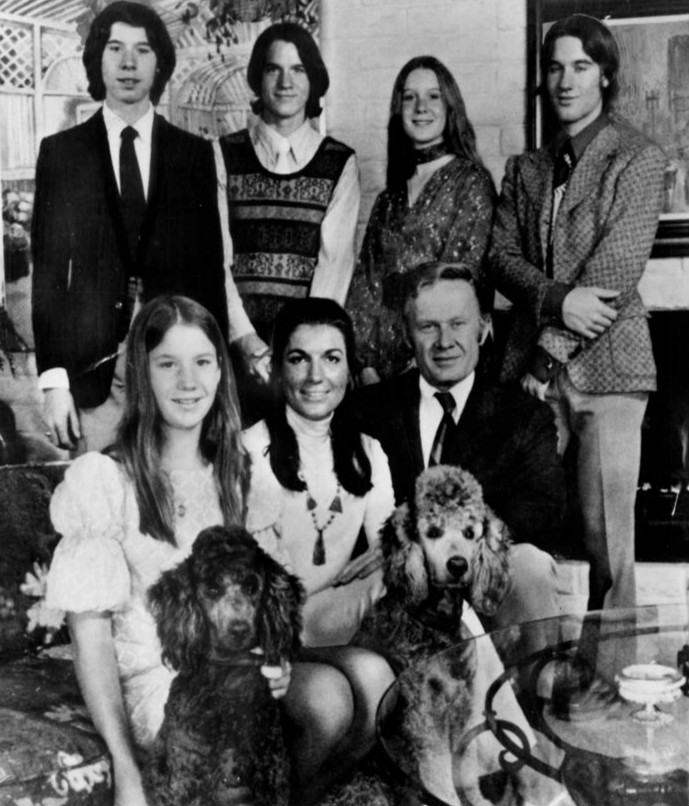
The "cast" of An American Family

- An American Family, arguably the first "reality show" on television, was launched as a 12-episode series on the U.S. Public Broadcasting System. The show was the edited product of seven months of a production crew following around a Santa Monica, California husband and wife and their five teenage children, and filming their private lives. From May 30 until December 31, 1971, 300 hours of film was made of business executive Bill Loud, his wife Pat, and their three sons and two daughters, then editing it to twelve 50-minute shows.
- The "Phase II" wage controls that had been implemented by U.S. president Nixon on November 14, 1971, ended along with all U.S. government limits on the raising of rent. With the issuance of Executive Order 11695, Price controls continued for six months on food, health care and construction as part of the authority granted to the U.S. president the Economic Stabilization Act of 1970. Nixon called on industries to voluntarily hold down price and wage increases.
- All Australian involvement in combat in the Vietnam War ceased by order of Australia's Governor-General, Paul Hasluck. Troops remained in South Vietnam until July 1, 1973.
- Former CIA agent E. Howard Hunt, leader of the White House Special Investigations Unit team that had been called "the White House Plumbers" because of the assignment to determine the source of news leaks to the media), became the first major participant in the Watergate scandal to plead guilty to charges. He would be sentenced to 8 years in prison and would serve for less than 3.
- Joshua Wanume Kibedi, the Foreign Minister of Uganda, resigned abruptly while he was out of the country, attending a conference of foreign ministers of the Organisation of African Unity in Accra, capital of Ghana. Kibedi made the decision days after his uncle, former Ugandan Minister of Health Shaban Nkutu, had been kidnapped and murdered on orders of Ugandan President Idi Amin. Kibedi's sister, Malyamu Kibedi Amin, was one of President Amin's two wives, and Foreign Minister Kibedi feared for his own life and made the decision not to return, going into exile instead in the United Kingdom.
- William T. Farr, a reporter for the Los Angeles Herald Examiner, was freed from jail after having been held in contempt of court for 48 days for refusing to reveal his confidential source for an article he had written in 1972 about the Charles Manson murder trial. U.S. Supreme Court Justice William O. Douglas ordered Farr's release while the contempt citation was on appeal to the U.S. Court of Appeals for the Ninth Circuit. "The case is a recurring one", Douglas wrote in his order, "when the interests of a fair trial sometimes collide with the requirements of a free press", but added "Yet since the precise question is a new one not covered by our prior decisions, I have concluded in the interest of justice to release Farr on his personal recognizance."
- At a meeting in Chicago, the 24 Major League Baseball team owners voted to allow the American League to implement the "designated hitter" rule starting with the 1973 season, marking the first time since the American League's founding in 1901 that the two leagues would be playing the game under different rules. The change, which permitted a team to designate a specific player who would substitute for the pitcher, but who would not be on the field when the other team was up to bat, was an amendment to Rule 3.03, which bars the pitcher from re-entering the game if he is replaced in the lineup. The "DH" rule had been tested in the minor International League in 1969 and had resulted in increased team batting averages, an increase in runs scored and a decrease in the length of a game. The rule would be used in the American League for 49 seasons before being adopted by the National League in 2022.
- The Dow Jones Industrial Average, commonly called "The Dow", the measure of performance on Wall Street of stocks on the New York Stock Exchange, reached its peak for the rest of the decade, closing at 1,051.70 points. The next day, the Dow dropped 12.34 points and then began a steady decline that would last almost two years, with stocks averaging a 45.1 percent decrease in value and closing at a low of 577.60 on December 6, 1974. "The Dow" would not break the 1973 peak until almost 10 years later, with a close on November 3, 1982, of 1,065.49.
- BBC Open University, which had offered degrees to older and working students through distance learning with early morning broadcasts on BBC-2 that started on January 3, 1971, awarded its first diplomas.
- Members of the all-male Harvard Club of New York City voted overwhelmingly, 2,097 to 695, to admit women to the private social group for Harvard University alumni. On May 4, 1972, more members voted in favor of admitting women than had voted against (1,654 to 854), but the move fell 18 votes shy of the two-thirds majority required by the Harvard Club's bylaws.
- Born:
  - Paul Kehoe, Irish politician; in Bree, County Wexford
  - Rahul Dravid, Indian cricketer; in Indore, Madhya Pradesh

== January 12, 1973 (Friday) ==
- The General Electric Company of the United States signed an agreement with the Soviet Union's State Committee for Science and Technology (GKNT, Gosudarstvennyi Komitet po Nauke i Tekhnike) for a joint research project to develop new electric power generating technology. The G.E.—U.S.S.R. pact was the first direct cooperative agreement between the Communist nation and a major capitalist corporation.

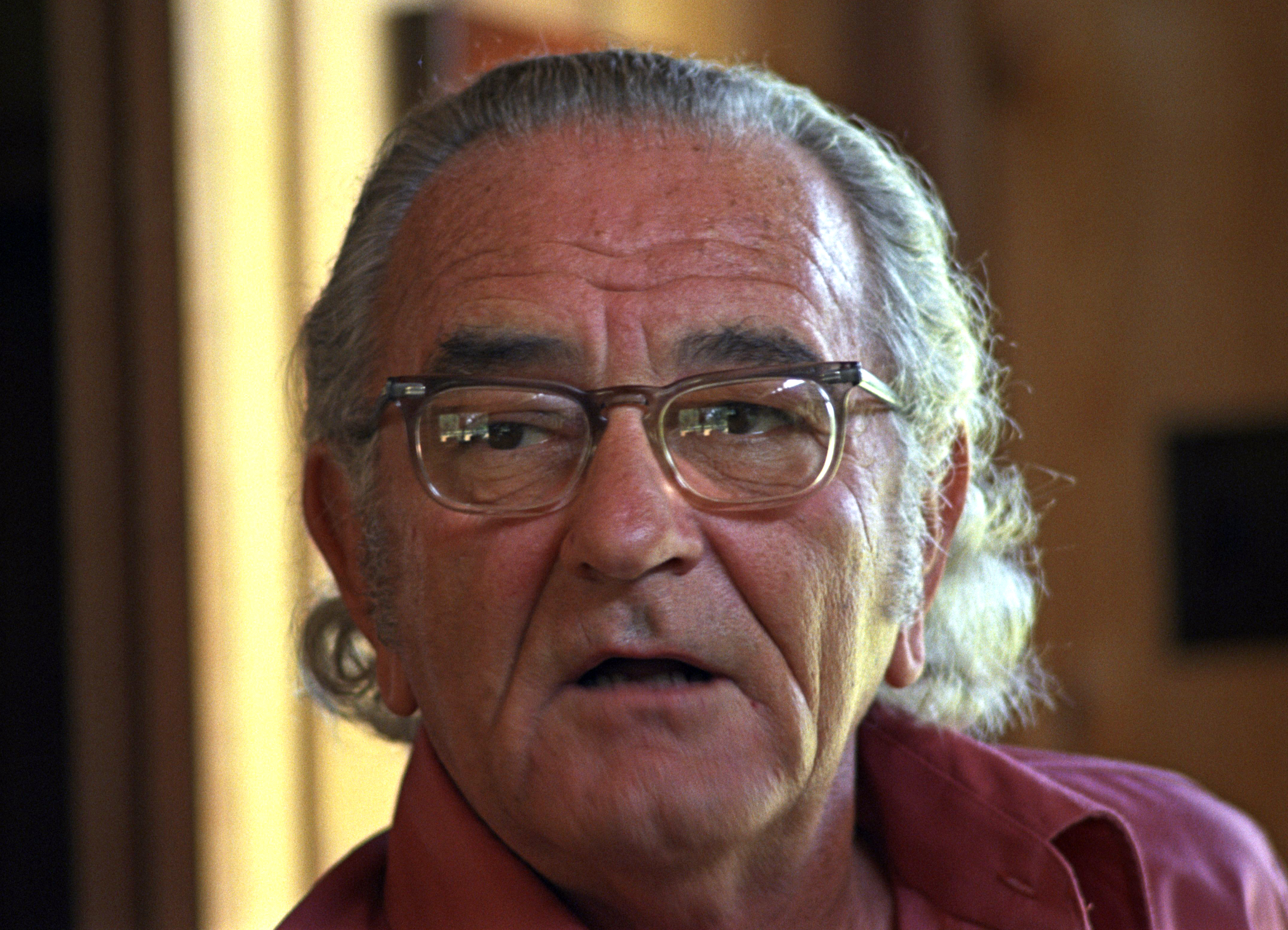
Former U.S. president Johnson

- Former U.S. President Lyndon B. Johnson recorded his final interview, inviting CBS Evening News anchorman Walter Cronkite to the LBJ Ranch in Stonewall, Texas. Johnson died of a heart attack 10 days later. Cronkite's interview was telecast on February 1 on CBS.
- The secret police agency of Morocco, the Direction de la Surveillance du Térritoire (DST, or Directorate of Territorial Surveillance) was created along with its foreign intelligence spy agency, the Direction générale des études et de la documentation (DGED or General Directorate for Studies and Documentation) by a dahir or royal decree by King Hassan II in the aftermath of a second attempted coup d'état.
- Les Halles, which had operated as the central food market in Paris since the 18th century, closed permanently to make way for construction of the Westfield Forum des Halles, a modern shopping mall built largely underground.
- The Perth suburb of Pickering Brook, Western Australia was officially created.
- Born:
  - Hande Yener (stage name for Makbule Hande Özyener), popular Turkish singer; in Kadıköy, Istanbul
  - A. Lee Martinez, American fantasy fiction author; in El Paso, Texas
- Died:
  - Roy F. Nichols, 76, American Pulitzer Prize-winning historian (in 1949 for The Disruption of American Democracy)
  - Albert "Turk" Edwards, 65, American NFL tackle and later coach for the Washington Redskins, and inductee into the Pro Football Hall of Fame, died two days before the Redskins were scheduled to play in their first Super Bowl.

== January 13, 1973 (Saturday) ==
- Eric Clapton's Rainbow Concert was recorded in London's Rainbow Theatre.
- The Pro Football Hall of Fame welcomed 3 new inductees. Baltimore Colts' gift of grab wide receiver Raymond Berry, and Berry's teammate also from the Colts, Jim Parker and from the Detroit Lions' Joe Schmidt.
- Died:
  - Mohamed Amekrane, 35, Moroccan Air Force lieutenant colonel who had been convicted of treason for the attempted assassination and coup d'état of King Hassan II on August 16, was executed by a firing squad at the prison in Kenitra.
  - Prince Ranieri, Duke of Castro, 89, pretender to the throne of the Kingdom of the Two Sicilies

== January 14, 1973 (Sunday) ==
- In Italy, agents of the Israeli intelligence agency Mossad foiled an attempt by the PLO to shoot down a jet transporting Israeli Prime Minister Golda Meir to Rome's Fiumicino Airport. Meir was in Italy on a state visit to meet President Leone and Pope Paul VI, and Mossad had only learned about the plot the day before. Spotting a Fiat van in a field near the flight path of Meir's airplane, a Mossad agent ordered the driver to step out of the van, and a gun fight began, with two terrorists being wounded. A search found that the van had six heat-seeking missiles and a launcher, and after torture, the captured driver revealed the location of a backup team with missiles and launchers mounted on a van. A Mossad truck rammed the second team's van and detained the would-be assassins. Mrs. Meir's flight, and El Al jet bringing her to Rome after her visit to Paris, landed that evening under heavy security, taxiing to a spot more than one mile from the passenger terminal, where she was met by a chauffeur and officials from the Italian Foreign Ministry. The next day, she became the first Israeli prime minister to meet with a Pope.
- Elvis Presley's "Aloha from Hawaii via Satellite" concert was performed in Honolulu at 12:30 in the morning local time, to be seen live in Australia, the Philippines, Japan, South Korea, South Vietnam and Hong Kong, and on tape delay everywhere else in the world.
- The Miami Dolphins defeated the Washington Redskins, 14–7, to win Super Bowl VII and to complete the NFL's first, and thus far only, "perfect season", with no losses or ties in the regular season or the postseason. The Dolphins finished with a record of 14-0-0 in regular play and then won their three playoff games.
- All 29 people aboard a CAAC Airlines airplane in the People's Republic of China were killed when the Ilyushin Il-14 twin-engine plane, CAAC 644, crashed into the side of a mountain in Guiyang in Guizhou province.
- The day before Israel's Prime Minister Golda Meir was scheduled to fly in a jet to Rome for a state visit to Italy and to the Vatican, the Israeli intelligence agency Mossad learned of a possible Palestine Liberation Organization plot to assassinate her by shooting down her airplane. .
- The Enemy is Dead, a play written by Don Petersen, opened on Broadway at the Bijou Theatre and closed after one performance.
- Born: Artur Ayvazyan, Armenian Ukrainian sport shooter and 2008 Olympic gold medalist; in Yerevan, Armenian SSR, Soviet Union

== January 15, 1973 (Monday) ==
- Citing progress in peace negotiations, U.S. President Richard Nixon announced the suspension of offensive action in North Vietnam during the Vietnam War, to go into effect on January 27. On the same day, with the cessation of hostilities still 12 days away, the U.S. Navy's Strike Fighter Squadron 25 (VFA-25) carried out a bombing attack on 14 North Vietnamese bridges.
- France's Department of the Overseas signed a treaty with representatives of the Comoro Islands, guaranteeing the African island territory full independence within five years, subject to a referendum of all residents of the four islands.
- Six days of voting on approval of a new Constitution of the Philippines concluded, with a majority of 90.67% of the voters in favor.
- On the same day in the Philippines, the execution in the electric chair of convicted drug trafficker Lim Seng was broadcast on national television, by order of President Ferdinand Marcos.
- Four additional defendants in the first Watergate burglary trial accepted a plea bargain rather than risk conviction by a jury and a longer prison sentence. Miami real estate agent Bernard L. Barker and three of his associates, Frank A. Sturgis, Eugenio Martínez and Virgilio Gonzalez all pled guilty before Judge John J. Sirica.
- The West Germany TV situation comedy Ein Herz und eine Seele ("One Heart and One Soul", adapted (as with the U.S. sitcom All in the Family) from the British series Till Death Us Do Part broadcast its first of 25 episodes. Part of the schedule of the ARD network, the show featured Heinz Schubert in the (Alf Garnett/Archie Bunker) role as "Alfred Tetzlaff", a right-wing bigot, along with his wife "Else", a daughter ("Rita") and son-in-law ("Michael").
- Born:
  - Eduard Prutnik, Ukrainian mining entrepreneur and philanthropist who chairs the United World International Foundation; in Selydivka, Ukrainian SSR, Soviet Union (now Selydove, Ukraine)
  - Essam El Hadary, Egyptian soccer football goalkeeper with 159 appearances for the Egyptian national team; in Kafr El Battikh, Damietta Governorate
  - Tomáš Galásek, Czech soccer football midfielder with 69 appearances for the Czech Republic national team; in Frýdek-Místek, Czechoslovakia
  - Barrie-Jon Mather, English rugby player who became the first to play on the national teams for both rugby league (for the Great Britain team 1994–1996) and the rugby union team (for England in 1999); in Wigan, Lancashire
- Died: Coleman Francis, 53, American film actor and "B movie" producer known for The Beast of Yucca Flats and two sequels

== January 16, 1973 (Tuesday) ==
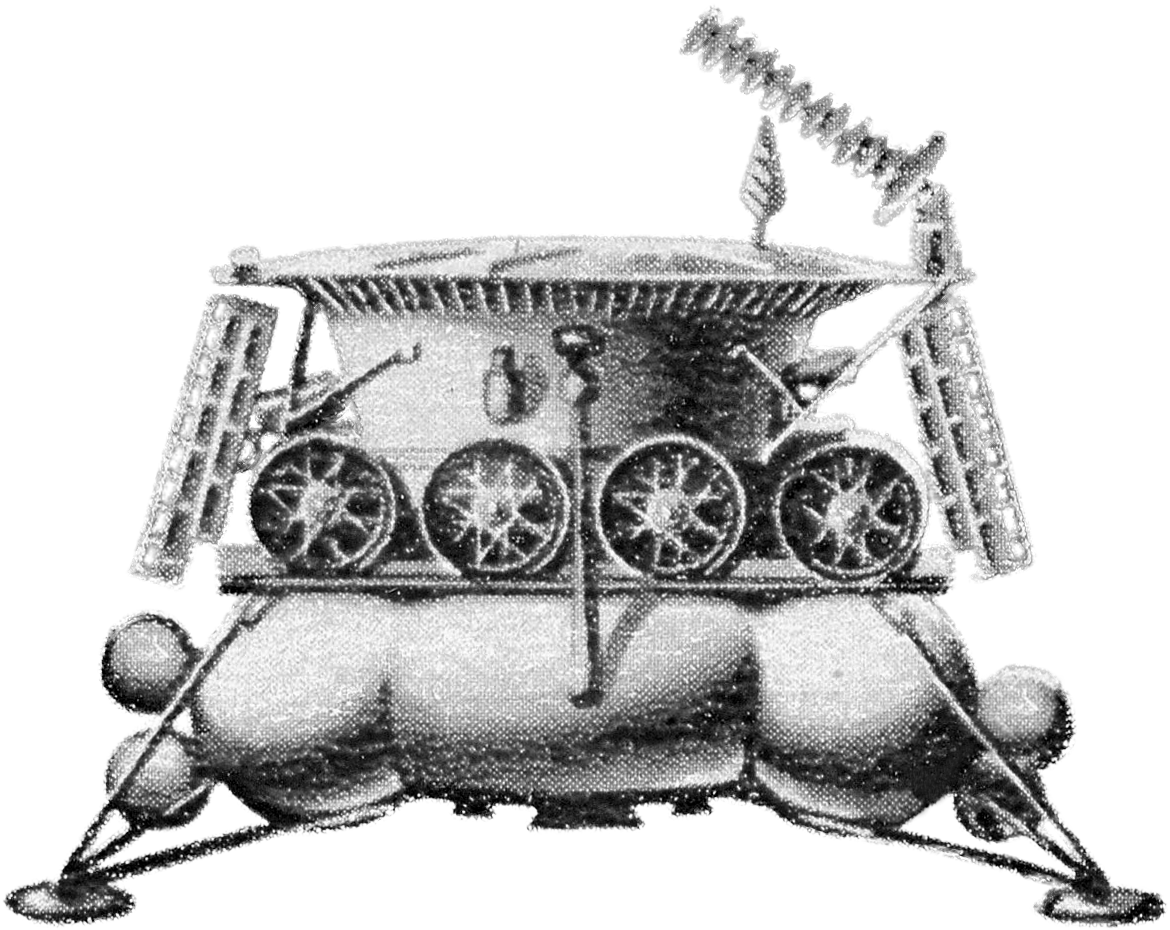
The Lunokhod rover on the Luna 21 module

- Luna 21, the uncrewed Soviet probe carrying the Lunokhod 2 lunar rover landed on the Moon at the Le Monnier crater at 1:35 in the morning Moscow time (2335 on 15 January UTC). The 8-wheeled Lunokhod rover was dispatched from the lander at 4:14 (0114 UTC) and began transmitting television images from three cameras back to Earth, along with data from telephotometric cameras, an x-ray spectrometer, and x-ray telescope, a radiation detector, an astrophotometer, a magnetometer and a photodetector.
- The 431st and last episode of the NBC television western Bonanza, ending a run of 14 seasons. Number one in the ratings in three consecutive seasons from 1964–65 to 1966–67, the show had been in the five most popular for nine consecutive seasons until its penultimate season. After the death of popular actor Dan Blocker (Hoss Cartwright) before the 1971–72 season, the once-popular show could not compete against Maude and Hawaii Five-O and was ranked 50th for the year. Lorne Greene and Michael Landon were the only actors left from the original members of the fictional Cartwright family, introduced on September 12, 1959, as one of 32 Western programs on television at that time. Landon wrote and directed the final episode.
- Born: Eriko Tamura, Japanese voice actress and singer, star of the anime series Idol Densetsu Eriko; in Ibaraki Prefecture
- Died:
  - Clara Ward, 48, American gospel singer, died after suffering two strokes
  - Earl S. Herald, 58, American zoologist and host of the TV science show Science in Action, drowned off the coast of Mexico while scuba diving in search of the rare golden angelfish. Centropyge heraldi, the yellow "Herald's angelfish", is named in his honor.

== January 17, 1973 (Wednesday) ==
- Following a referendum in the Philippines, Proclamation No. 1102 certified and proclaimed that the new Philippine Constitution proposed by the Constitutional Convention of 1971 had been ratified by the Filipino people and had thereby come into effect, repealing the limits on the president's term of office. The new constitution made the presidency a ceremonial office and provided that actual control would be in the hands of the new office of Prime Minister of the Philippines, a job which Marcos appointed himself to. The legislature provided for in the new constitution could be suspended by the prime minister, and he dismissed the interim assembly that had been scheduled to take office.
- Born: Bill Hamel, American record producer; in Orlando, Florida (d. 2018)
- Died:
  - Ralph T. Walker, 83, American architect
  - Ted Koehler, 78, American lyricist

== January 18, 1973 (Thursday) ==
- In attempt to kill Hamaas Abdul Khaalis, a former member of the Nation of Islam ("Black Muslim") movement, five children and two adults were murdered in Washington, D.C. Khaalis, born "Ernest McGee" before converting to Islam and joining the Black Muslims, had split with the group to follow the Hanafi branch of Sunni Islam, and had sent letters to the 50 Nation of Islam mosques in the U.S. criticizing the movement's leader Elijah Muhammad. In retaliation, seven members of the "Black Mafia" invaded the Hanafi Muslim headquarters and killed Khaalis's children and two adults. Ultimately, four defendants would be convicted of murder. In 1977, Khaalis would later lead 11 Hanafi Movement gunmen to seize 149 hostages in a takeover of the District of Columbia building with the motive of calling attention to the 1973 murder of his family.
- The six-year term of Urho Kekkonen, President of Finland, set to expire on March 1, 1974, was extended by four years in a 170 to 28 vote by the nation's parliament, the Suomen Eduskunta. The change in law came at Kekkonen's request, after he decided that he did not want Foreign Minister Ahti Karjalainen to succeed him. Kekkonen had been president since 1956 and had started his third 6-year term in 1968.
- The government of France began a program of replacing 350 English-language words with French substitutes issued by a "terminology commission" chaired by former Prime Minister Jacques Chaban-Delmas, and the approval of the French Academy. Among the changes were retrospectif (for "flashback"), palmares (for "hit parade"), navire citerne (for a "tanker" ship) and avion ADAC (for a "STOL aircraft").
- The 28 people killed in the 1972 crash in the Andes of a Uruguayan airplane flight were given a funeral service by a Chilean priest and burial in a common grave more than 400 metres (1,300 ft) from the airplane's fuselage.
- President's rule was declared in the Indian state of Andhra Pradesh after Chief Minister P. V. Narasimha Rao resigned.
- Eleven Labour Party councillors in Clay Cross, Derbyshire in England, were ordered to pay £6,985 for not enforcing the Housing Finance Act.
- In a dramatic upset in the National Hockey League, the NHL's worst team, the first-year expansion club New York Islanders (with a record of 4 wins, 37 losses and 4 ties) defeated the defending Stanley Cup champions, the 28-10-4 Boston Bruins, 9 to 7, in Boston in a regular season game. The win snapped the Islanders' 12-game losing streak. Boston would finish with 51 wins, 22 losses and 5 ties for the second-best record in the 16-team league, while the Islanders remained the worst, with a record of 12-60-6.
- Timothy Leary, a former Harvard University professor and advocate of recreational drug use, who later escaped from prison and fled the U.S., was returned to the United States after being arrested by police in Afghanistan.
- Born: Guo Degang, Chinese comedian and actor specializing in xiangsheng or "crosstalk"; in Tianjin
- Died: Abdul Qaiyum Ansari, 67, Indian Muslim and independence activist who had campaigned to prevent the division of British India into two nations. In 1947, the predominantly Muslim areas became the nation of Pakistan while the Hindu areas became the Dominion of India.

== January 19, 1973 (Friday) ==
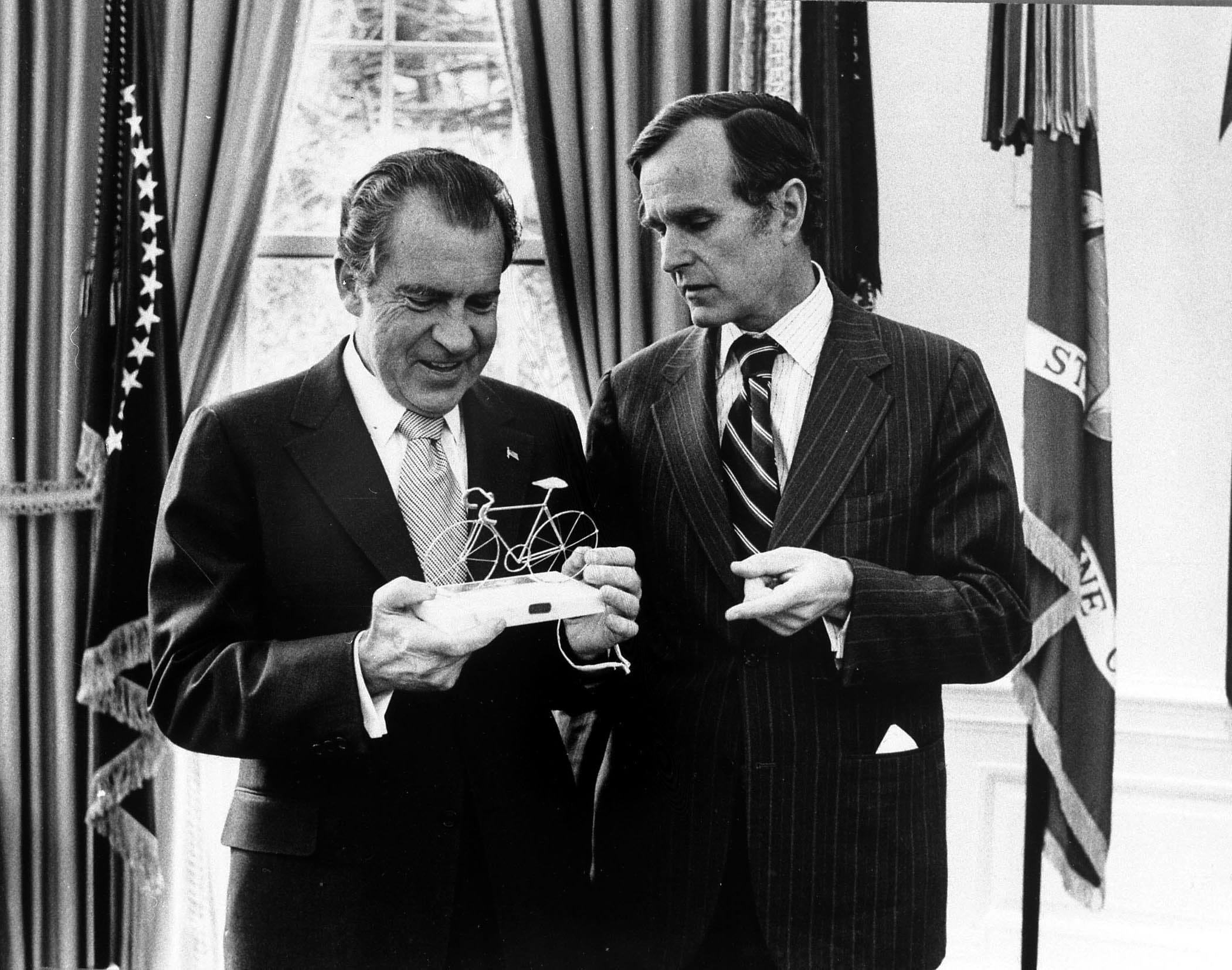
The 37th president and the future 41st president in 1973

- George Bush, the former U.S. Ambassador to the United Nations and future President of the United States, was appointed Chair of the Republican National Committee, replacing Bob Dole, U.S. Senator for Kansas.
- Born:
  - Michèle Gavazzi, Uruguayan-born Canadian writer of French language children's literature, known for her series of books for girls; in Montevideo
  - Kiyanu Kim, South Korean-born American songwriter; in Seoul
- Died:
  - Annie Buller, 77, Canadian labor union organizer and co-founder (in 1921) of the Communist Party of Canada
  - Max Adrian, 69, Northern Irish stage, film and television actor

== January 20, 1973 (Saturday) ==
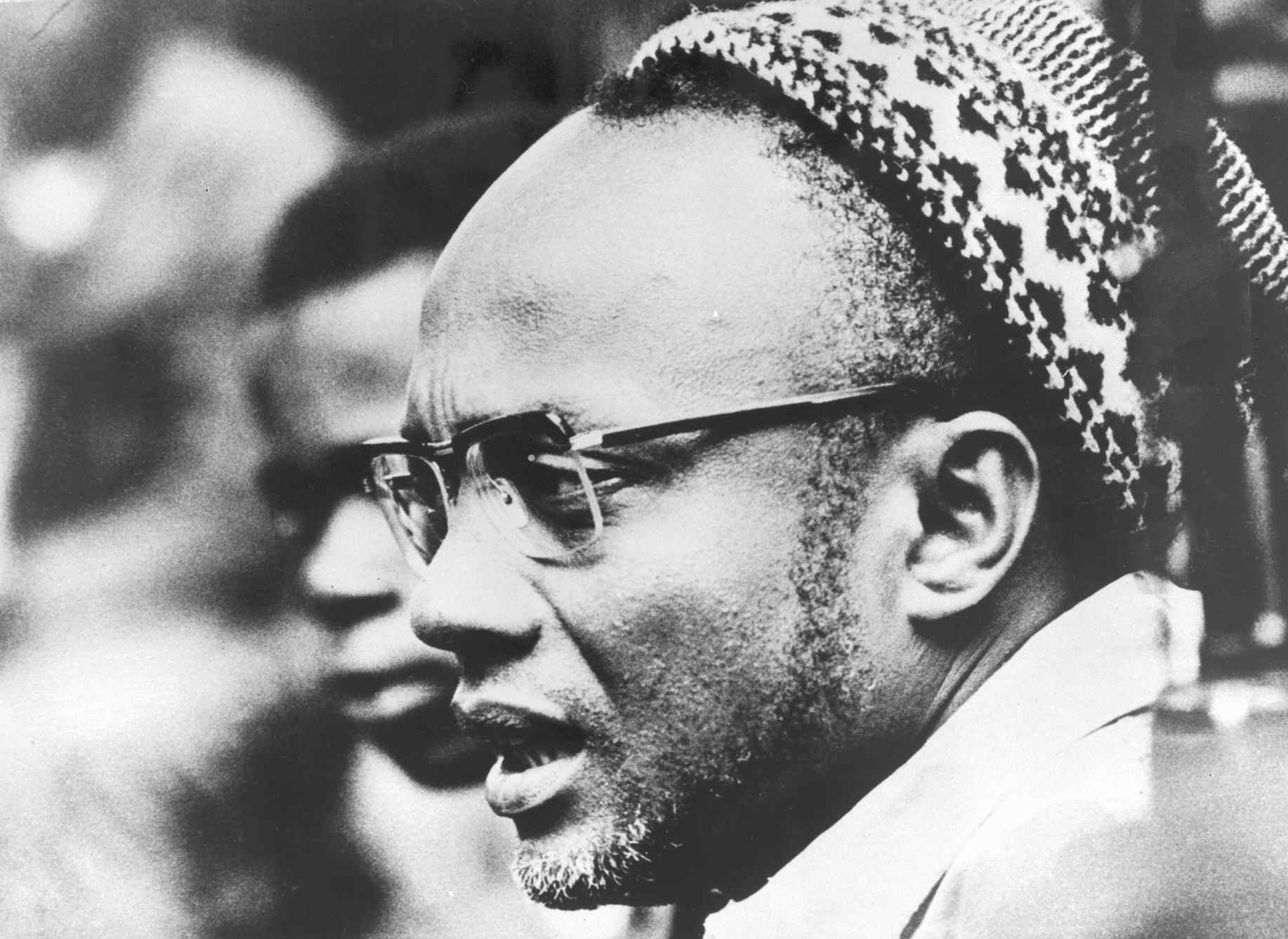
Cabral

- Amílcar Cabral, the leader of the fight for the independence of the African colonies of Portuguese Guinea from Portugal, was shot and killed by two former members of his organization. In 1956, Cabral had been one of the co-founders of the Partido Africano para a Independência da Guiné e Cabo Verde (PAIGC) and its leader since 1963, guiding the operations from the republic (and former French colony) of Guinea. He was in front of his house in the Guinean capital of Conakry when he was assassinated. Guinea-Bissau would proclaim its independence eight months later under Cabral's successor, his younger brother Luís Cabral.
- The government of the Soviet Union made official its "education tax" on emigrants, a higher fee for legally moving away out of the country. The Bulletin of the Supreme Soviet published the decree made on August 3, 1972, by President of the Presidium Nikolai V. Podgorny. Based on a theory that the Soviet government had provided free education for citizens, the "tax" was based upon the level of education as well as length of employment and averaged an additional 8,000 Soviet rubles (officially, $10,000 in U.S. dollars), an amount that represented the total gross earnings over five years for an engineer or physician.

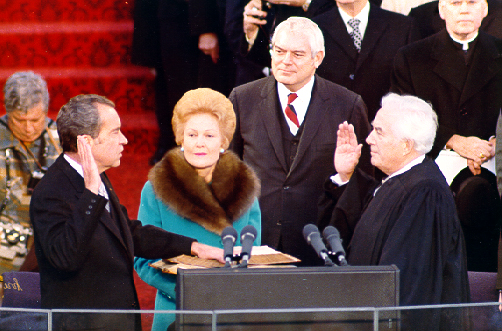
Nixon sworn in by Chief Justice Warren Burger

- U.S. President Richard Nixon was inaugurated for his second term. In his inaugural address, Nixon began by saying that before he started his term, "America was bleak in spirit, depressed by the prospect of seemingly endless war abroad and of destructive conflict at home", but that "As we meet here today, we stand on the threshold of a new era of peace in the world", and asked "How shall we use that peace?" Paraphrasing a line used in John F. Kennedy's 1961 inaugural speech, Nixon said "In our own lives, let each of us ask now just what will government do for me, but what can I do for myself?"
- Boxer Romeo Anaya of Mexico defeated WBA champion Enrique Pinder of Panama in Panama City to win the world bantamweight championship.
- Born: Queen Mathilde of Belgium, wife of King Philippe and Queen Consort since 2013; as Mathilde d'Udekem d'Acoz in Uccle.

== January 21, 1973 (Sunday) ==
- Aeroflot Flight 6263, carrying 39 passengers and crew, crashed in snow while making its approach to the Perm International Airport in the Soviet Union's Russian SFSR, its final scheduled destination after departing from Kazan on a flight that had originated in Krasnodar. While only four people died from the impact of the crash of the Antonov An-24B in rugged terrain near Petukhovo, 57 miles (92 km) from Perm, the 35 survivors froze to death in −40 °F (−40 °C) while awaiting rescue.

== January 22, 1973 (Monday) ==
- The U.S. Supreme Court rendered its decision in Roe v. Wade by a vote of 7 to 2, overturning individual state bans in the first three months of pregnancy on a woman's right to an abortion, concluding that such bans deprive a woman of a fundamental liberty without due process of the law contrary to the 14th Amendment to the United States Constitution. States were allowed to bar abortions during the final 10 weeks of pregnancy. The Texas case had been consolidated with the lesser known Georgia case of Doe v. Bolton. Justices Byron R. White and William H. Rehnquist dissented, while Harry A. Blackmun was joined in the majority opinion by fellow justices William O. Douglas, William J. Brennan Jr., Potter Stewart, Thurgood Marshall, Lewis F. Powell Jr., and Chief Justice Warren Burger. For nearly half a century afterward, a division between "pro-life" and "pro-choice" positions on abortion would continue with challenges until the overruling of Roe v. Wade on June 24, 2022, in the case of Dobbs v. Jackson Women's Health Organization.
- The crash of a ALIA Royal Jordanian Airlines flight from Saudi Arabia to Nigeria killed 176 of the 202 people on board. The chartered Boeing 707 was bringing Muslim pilgrims back home and had taken off from Jeddah before it crashed in Kano, Nigeria.
- Former U.S. President Lyndon B. Johnson, who had served from 1963 to 1969, suffered a massive heart attack at 3:50 p.m. local time while at his LBJ Ranch in Stonewall, Texas, and died shortly thereafter. According to contemporary reports, he picked up the phone next to his bed and told the switchboard operator at the Ranch, "Send Mike immediately," referring to his Secret Service agent, Mike Howard. The nearest agents, Ed Noland and Harry Harris reached Johnson's bedroom at 3:52 and found him lying on the floor, dead. The death of Johnson, coming 27 days after that of Harry S. Truman, marked the first time since a two-month period in 1933 that there were no former U.S. presidents alive, after the death of Calvin Coolidge on January 5, until March 4, Herbert Hoover, when exited office.
- George Foreman, a 24-year-old challenger, defeated champion Joe Frazier in Kingston, Jamaica to win the heavyweight world boxing championship.
- Born: Erin O'Toole, Canadian politician, MP of Durham and former Opposition leader; in Montreal

== January 23, 1973 (Tuesday) ==
- The Eldfell volcano on the Icelandic island of Heimaey erupted at 1:55 in the morning near the town of Vestmannaeyjar. The 5,500 inhabitants of the island were evacuated by the fishing boats already docked in the island's harbor. The eruption would last until July 3.
- After U.S. National Security Adviser Henry Kissinger and North Vietnamese negotiator Lê Đức Thọ attached an agreement on terms of a treaty at 12:30 p.m. local time in Paris, President Richard Nixon announced that a peace agreement had been reached in Paris to end the Vietnam War, including the release by North Vietnam of all American prisoners of war, and a complete withdrawal of U.S. combat troops from South Vietnam by March. The cease-fire was scheduled to take effect on Saturday, January 27. Nixon spoke on national television in the evening and said that "we today have concluded an agreement to end the war and bring peace with honor in Vietnam and in Southeast Asia."
- American inventors Mario Cardullo and William L. Parks, received U.S. patent 3,713,148 for the first radio-frequency identification transmitter, the first implantable tracking device, after having filed the application on May 21, 1970.
- The U.S. House of Representatives implemented electronic voting for the first time in its history, with the members of Congress pushing buttons on their desks rather than the more time-consuming roll call. The first test was for a quorum call, moved for by Congressman Wayne Hays of Ohio, to determine if the House had a quorum of at least 218 members present to conduct business.
- After lying in state at the Lyndon Baines Johnson Library and Museum in Austin, Texas, the late president Johnson was flown in his casket to Washington, D.C., to lie in state in the United States Capitol.
- Born:
  - Mark Boal, American screenwriter and producer, winner of two Academy Awards for The Hurt Locker; in New York City
  - Zurab Gegenava, Georgian broadcasting executive and philanthropist; in Tbilisi, Georgian SSR, Soviet Union
- Died: Alexander Onassis, 24, Greek businessman, heir to the Aristotle Onassis fortune and chairman of Olympic Airways, died one day after being fatally injured in the crash of his single-engine airplane on takeoff from the Athens airport.

== January 24, 1973 (Wednesday) ==
- SAIL, the Steel Authority of India, Ltd., was incorporated by the government of India as a state-owned steel producer administered from New Delhi by India's Ministry of Steel and Mines.
- Advanced Chemical Industries Ltd. was incorporated in Bangladesh as Imperial Chemical Industries Bangladesh after the government purchased the assets of the company from its British owners.
- U.S. Ambassador to Haiti Clinton E. Knox and Consul General Ward L. Christensen were taken hostage by terrorists who invaded Knox's home at Port-au-Prince and demanded the release of 12 political prisoners, a ransom of $70,000 and safe conduct to Mexico. Knox and Christensen were safely released in Mexico after the terrorists' demands were met.
- Ajax Amsterdam of the Netherlands won European football's first Super Cup, defeating Rangers F.C. of Glasgow in Scotland on the second leg of the home-and-away series. The winner of the series, contested between the winners 1971–72 season for the European Cup (Ajax) and the European Cup Winners' Cup (Rangers), was determined on an aggregate of the two matches, and Ajax had beaten Rangers, 3 to 1, in Glasgow on January 16 in front of 57,000 people at Ibrox Stadium. On the second game, Ajax won, 3–2, in front of 26,168 people at Olympic Stadium, for an aggregate of 6 to 3.
- The second section of the Autostrada A56 opened in Italy.
- Died:
  - J. Carrol Naish, 77, American film, stage, TV and radio actor known for Sahara and A Medal for Benny, as well as the star of the radio series Life With Luigi. The Associated Press noted that during the 1940s, "Naish was making 30 movies a year and played virtually every nationality in film— Italians, Japanese, Hindus, Arabs, Chinese, Jews and Mexicans— every nationality in fact except his own: Irish."
  - Anthony Sagar, 52, British character actor on film and television
  - Ali Haydar Yıldız, 19, Turkish Kurdish activist, was killed in a shootout in a raid by the Turkish Army in the village of Vartinik upon the Communist Party of Turkey/Marxist–Leninist (TKP/ML). The party's leader, İbrahim Kaypakkaya, was wounded but escaped, only to be turned over to police a few days later for execution.

== January 25, 1973 (Thursday) ==
- A state funeral in Washington, D.C. for former U.S. President Lyndon B. Johnson took place at the National City Christian Church. Johnson had died three days earlier in Texas, after which his flag-draped casket was flown to Washington to "lie in state" in the U.S. Capitol building. Following the funeral, the later president's body was flown back to Texas and buried in a cemetery two miles from the LBJ Ranch.
- National Lampoon: Lemmings, an off-Broadway comedy and music show at the Village Gate nightclub in New York City's Greenwich Village, began the first of 350 performances and launched the careers of John Belushi, Cornelius "Chevy" Chase and Christopher Guest. Belushi was praised by a critic for The New York Times for his portrayals of Pontius Pilate and Marlon Brando in parodies of Jesus Christ Superstar and The Godfather, "Chevy Chase's aping of President Nixon" in a skit called "Mrs. Agnew's Diary" (the show's "attempt at political satire") was described as piddling.
- English actor Derren Nesbitt was convicted of assaulting his wife, Anne Aubrey.
- Born:
  - Yasir Naqvi, Canadian-Pakistani politician, Member of Parliament for Ottawa Centre, in Karachi, Pakistan
  - Oren Harman, Israeli science writer; in Jerusalem
- Died:
  - William J. Staunton, 46, Northern Irish magistrate judge, from gunshot wounds sustained in an October 11 attack by two IRA members.
  - Ada Mackenzie, 81, Canadian golfer and enshrinee in the Canada Sports Hall of Fame

== January 26, 1973 (Friday) ==
- The Battle of Cua Viet began on the morning before the U.S. and North Vietnam signed the Paris Peace Accords, as South Vietnam's Army of the Republic of Viet Nam (ARVN) ground troops, supplemented by air cover from the U.S. Air Force and U.S. Navy, attempted to recapture the port of Cua Viet in the Quảng Trị province and failed. North Vietnam claimed that 2,330 ARVN troops were killed or wounded, while South Vietnam claimed that the North sustained 1,000 casualties.
- The Tokyo Metropolitan Murders, a string of rapes and killings of 10 women, usually with a modus operandi of burning the bodies, began with the strangling, followed by burning, of a 22-year old office worker at her apartment in the Kita section. The death was similar to one that had taken place in Tokyo in 1968. A 67-year-old woman and a 22-year-old man would be burned to death on February 13, after which the Tokyo murderer stayed away from crime until a streak of killings that ran for more than six weeks from June 25 to August 9, 1974.
- The Convention for the Suppression of Unlawful Acts against the Safety of Civil Aviation, signed in Montreal on September 23, 1971, was declared effective after having been ratified by at least 10 nations; before the Ukrainian SSR (considered a separate member of the United Nations) had ratified, 17 nations had already deposited their instruments of ratification.
- A U.S. Marine on guard duty became the first American to die after the signing of the Paris Peace Accords, which were not scheduled to take effect until 8:00 a.m. local time on January 28. Private First Class Mark Miller, USMC, was killed by enemy shelling of the Biên Hòa Air Base near Saigon.
- Born: Frankie Biggz (stage name for Francisco Lucio), American record producer; in Monroe, Michigan
- Died: Edward G. Robinson (stage name for Emanuel Goldenberg), 79, Romanian-born American film and stage actor known for his "tough guy" roles, died of cancer 12 days after completion of filming of his final role as a supporting actor in Soylent Green.

== January 27, 1973 (Saturday) ==
- U.S. involvement in the Vietnam War ended with the signing of the Paris Peace Accords at the Hôtel Majestic. Neither Lê Đức Thọ or Henry Kissinger, who negotiated for North Vietnam and the U.S., respectively, was present for the signing of "Agreement on Ending the War and Restoring Peace in Vietnam"
- At Paris, the government of North Vietnam and delegates from the Viet Cong presented U.S. representatives a list of 555 American prisoners of war that it was prepared to release, while the U.S. provided a list of 26,000 North Vietnamese and Viet Cong prisoners that were being held by the South Vietnamese government. The U.S. Department of Defense was aware of 1,925 missing personnel, and 1,370 servicemen would be listed permanently as "missing in action." After reviewing the names, the U.S. Department of Defense said through a spokesman, "there are 56 men that we had previously carried on our list of prisoners of war" who were not on the list provided.
- The consul general and vice consul of the Turkish consulate in Los Angeles were assassinated by a 77-year-old survivor of the Armenian genocide. Consul General Mehmet Baydar, 48, and Vice Consul Bahadir Demir were shot to death by a 77-year old Armenian-American, Gourgen Yanikian, in retaliation for the Ottoman Turks murder of 26 members of Yanikian's family and at least 600,000 Armenians more than 55 years earlier. Yanikian lured both men to a cottage at the Biltmore Hotel in Santa Barbara, California, wounded them, and then killed each one with a gunshot to the head.
- Outgoing U.S. Secretary of Defense Melvin R. Laird announced that the United States armed forces would become an all-volunteer organization and that no further draft of U.S. citizens would take place.

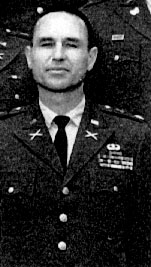
Lt. Colonel Nolde

- Died: U.S. Army Lieutenant Colonel William Nolde, 43, of Mount Pleasant, Michigan, was killed by North Vietnamese artillery fire at An Lộc in South Vietnam, at 9:00 in the evening local time, 11 hours before the ceasefire agreed upon in Paris took effect. Colonel Nolde became the last combat death in the Vietnam War

== January 28, 1973 (Sunday) ==
- With the expiration of hostilities the Vietnam War to go into effect at 0:00 Universal Time, the ceasefire began at 8:00 in the morning local time. The war continued in the neighboring kingdom of Laos, where no truce had been reached, and U.S. B-52 bombers continued to bomb suspected Communist positions and supply lines that were infiltrating South Vietnam.
- Elections were held in Senegal, at the time a one-party republic in West Africa, where voters were given a choice of voting yes or no on the slate of candidates offered by the Union Progressiste Senegalaise. President Léopold Sédar Senghor, unopposed, was approved for a third term of five years, and the 100-member slate of candidates for the Assemblée nationale du Sénégal were endorsed.
- The television detective drama Barnaby Jones premiered on the CBS television network for the first of 178 episodes and eight seasons. At the age of 64, Buddy Ebsen, who had starred in the comedy The Beverly Hillbillies from 1962 to 1971, took on a dramatic role as an elderly private investigator seeking to find the killer of his son-in-law between cases. Actress Lee Meriwether portrayed his daughter-in-law and assistant in the program, a production of Quinn Martin.
- The Golden Globe Awards were presented for film and television for the year 1972.
- The Argentine Grand Prix was held at the Oscar Gálvez circuit and was won by Emerson Fittipaldi.
- Died:
  - John Banner, 63, Austrian-born American stage, film and TV actor best known for playing Sergeant Schultz on Hogan's Heroes, died while visiting friends in Austria.
  - Hayden W. Lingo, 65, American pool player who invented the game of one-pocket

== January 29, 1973 (Monday) ==
- The crash of EgyptAir Flight 741 killed all 37 people aboard, as the Ilyushin Il-18 impacted the side of a mountain as it was approaching the city of Nicosia in Cyprus after having departed from Cairo.
- An arsonist killed 10 of the 16 residents of Street's Rest Home in Pleasantville, New Jersey, including 106-year-old woman. A 22-year-old man who resided at the home was charged with setting the early-morning fire.
- Three people were killed in fighting in Belfast, capital of Northern Ireland. A member of the Ulster Defence Association (UDA) shot dead a Catholic civilian at his workplace, a petrol station on Kennedy Way, Belfast. Later, the UDA killed a 15-year-old Catholic civilian in a drive-by shooting at Falls Road/Donegall Road junction, and a Provisional IRA shot and killed dead UDA member Francis 'Hatchet' Smith, rumored to have led the group that shot the teenager.
- Born:
  - Pavel Voicu, Minister of Internal Affairs for the Republic of Moldova, later its Minister of Defense; in Macaresti, Moldavian SSR, Soviet Union
  - Jason Schmidt, American baseball pitcher, 2003 National League ERA leader; in Lewiston, Idaho
  - Arben Bajraktaraj, Kosovo-born French film actor; in Isniq, SR Serbia, Yugoslavia
- Died:
  - Caryl Jenner (stage name for Pamela Ripman), 55, British children's theatre director, died of lung cancer.
  - Ludwig Stossel, 89, Austrian-born American character actor on stage, film and television

== January 30, 1973 (Tuesday) ==
- Bass guitarist Gene Klein and rhythm guitarist Stanley Eisen, members of the heavy metal band Wicked Lester, introduced their reimagined format, wearing face makeup and playing before a group of 10 customers Popcorn Club, a bar located in the borough of Queens in New York City. Klein renamed himself Gene Simmons while Eisen became Paul Stanley. With drummer George Peter Criscuola (Peter Criss) and lead guitarist Paul "Ace" Frehley, the band played for the first time under the name Kiss.
- India nationalized its remaining private coal mines, bringing 184 under control the government company, Bharat Coking Coal Limited (BCCL) and 527 others under the Coal Mines Authority.
- The crash of a train into a bus killed 37 people and injured 18 others in the Hungarian city of Kecskemét.
- The U.S. Department of Defense announced that the list of 555 prisoners of war included a U.S. Marine, Private First Class Ronald L. Ridgeway of Houston, Texas, who had been listed as killed in action on February 25, 1968. Ridgeway had been on patrol with eight other Marines during the Battle of Khe Sanh when the group was ambushed, and a group burial had been made in the Jefferson Barracks National Cemetery in St. Louis, Missouri. After more than five years as a prisoner of war in the "Hanoi Hilton", Ridgeway was released with the other listed POWs on March 16, 1973 and would work in administration with the Veterans Administration and the U.S. Department of Veterans Affairs after returning to civilian life.
- G. Gordon Liddy and James W. McCord Jr., both former officials in the Committee to Re-Elect the President that had coordinated U.S. President Nixon's re-election campaign, were convicted by a federal jury in Washington on charges of conspiracy to spy on Democratic Party officials at the Watergate Hotel. Unlike the other five persons charged, Liddy and McCord had declined to enter a plea bargain, and the jury returned guilty verdicts after less than 90 minutes of deliberation.
- U.S. Senator John C. Stennis of Mississippi was shot and wounded in front of his Washington, D.C. home in an armed robbery "by two young men who took his wallet, 25 cents and his watch." The shooting did not appear to be politically-motivated. Despite a wound to the chest, Senator Stennis recovered after undergoing surgery at the Walter Reed Hospital. Six weeks later, on March 12, three young men were arrested by the FBI and charged with assault on a member of Congress under a 1971 federal law, and one pleaded guilty.
- The first 125 officers and enlisted men out of 37,000 Republic of Korea troops who were still remaining in South Vietnam returned home to Seoul as South Korea's pullout from the Vietnam War began.
- Born:
  - Jay Manalo, Vietnamese-born Filipino actor, in Saigon, South Vietnam
  - Jordan Prentice, Canadian actor; in London, Ontario
- Died:
  - Titina Silla, 29, Guinea-Bissau freedom fighter, in an ambush by Portuguese authorities. The anniversary of her death would later come to be celebrated as National Women's Day in Guinea Bissau.
  - Jack MacGowran, 54, Irish stage and film actor, died of complications from influenza. MacGowran, who had recently finished filming an appearance in The Exorcist, had been on leave from starring in the Broadway production of The Plough and the Stars at the Vivian Beaumont Theater at the Lincoln Center.
  - James Barlow, 51, British novelist

== January 31, 1973 (Wednesday) ==
- Rioting began in Syria when President Hafez al-Assad announced a new constitution that did not require the president to be a Muslim. Within a few weeks, Assad amended the constitution to restore the requirement and approval would come on March 13.
- Pan American and Trans World Airlines canceled their options to buy 13 Concorde airliners.
- Born: Baciro Djá, Prime Minister of Guinea-Bissau in 2015 and 2016.
- Died:
  - Ragnar Frisch, 77, Norwegian economist and winner of the 1969 Nobel Prize for Economics.
  - Dewey Barto (stage name for Stewart Swoyer), 76, American comedian who was half of the team of Barto and Mann
