= Gavazzi =

Gavazzi is an Italian surname. Notable people with the surname include:

- Alessandro Gavazzi (1809–1889), Italian preacher
- Artur Gavazzi (1861–1944), Croatian geographer
- Carla Gavazzi (1913–2008), Italian operatic soprano
- Davide Gavazzi (born 1986), Italian footballer who plays as a midfielder
- Francesco Gavazzi (born 1984), Italian cyclist
- Giovanni di Giacomo Gavazzi, also called Giacomo Gavasio (16th-century), Italian painter of the Renaissance style
- Mattia Gavazzi (born 1983), Italian cyclist
- Michèle Gavazzi (born 1973), Uruguayan-Canadian writer
- Milovan Gavazzi (1895–1992), Croatian ethnographer
- Modesto Gavazzi, O.F.M. Conv. (died 1608), Italian Roman Catholic Bishop of Alife
- Pierino Gavazzi (born 1950), Italian cyclist

== See also ==
- Gava (disambiguation)
- Palazzo Gavazzi, a Neoclassical palace in Del Monte district, Milan, Italy
