= Alistair Elliot =

British librarian, poet, and translator (1932–2018)

Alistair Elliot (13 October 1932 – 3 November 2018) was a British librarian, poet and translator.

== Life ==
Elliot was born in Liverpool, son of a Scottish family doctor and an English mother, and educated at Asheville School in the United States, Fettes College, Edinburgh, and Christ Church, Oxford.

Elliot was a vegetable invoice clerk in Covent Garden market, night sterilizer in a food factory, waiter, film critic, supply teacher, actor (with the English Children's Theatre under Caryl Jenner) and finally librarian in Kensington, Keele, Shiraz, and lastly at Newcastle University.

Elliot's translation of Euripides's Medea was performed in theatres in London and New York in a production by Jonathan Kent with Diana Rigg in the leading rôle.

Elliot's poems appeared in Oxford Poetry, The Paris Review, and many other journals.

== Awards ==
- 2000 Cholmondeley Award

== Works ==
=== Poetry ===
- Air in the Wrong Place, Eagle Press, 1968.
- Contentions, Ceolftith 38, 1977, signed edition ISBN 0 90446 1 24 6. ordinary edition ISBN 0 90446 1 21 1
- Kisses: Poems collaboration with Barry Hirst, Ceolfrith, 1978. ISBN 978-0-904461-42-8
- Talking Back, 1982.
- On the Appian Way, 1984.
- My country: collected poems. Carcanet. 1989. ISBN 978-0-85635-846-3.
- Turning the Stones. Carcanet. 1993. ISBN 978-1-85754-041-3.
- Facing Things. Carcanet. 1997. ISBN 978-1-85754-304-9.
- The Real Poems. Shoestring Press. 2008. ISBN 978-1-904886-71-6.
- Imaginary Lines. Shoestring Press. 2012. ISBN 978-1-907356-56-8.
- Telling the Stones. Shoestring Press. 2017. ISBN 978-1-910323-69-4.

=== Translation ===
- Heinrich Heine (1979). The Lazarus poems. Translated by Alistair Elliot. Mid Northumberland Arts Group. ISBN 9780856352874.
- Paul Verlaine (1979). Women-Men. Translated by Alistair Elliot. The Sheep Meadow Press. ISBN 978-0-935296-44-0.
- Virgil, John Dryden (1981). Alistair Elliot (ed.). The Georgics. Mid Northumberland Arts Group. ISBN 978-0-904790-13-9.
- French Love Poems. Bloodaxe Books. 1991. ISBN 978-1-85224-169-8.
- Euripides (1993). Medea. Translated by Alistair Elliot. Oberon Books.
- Italian Landscape Poems. Bloodaxe Books. 1994. ISBN 978-1-85224-247-3.
- Paul Valéry (1997). La Jeune Parque. Translated by Alistair Elliot. Bloodaxe Books. ISBN 978-1-85224-387-6.
- Roman food poems: a modern translation. Translated by Alistair Elliot. Prospect Books. 2003. ISBN 978-1-903018-25-5.
- Euripides (2008). Phaethon, reconstructed from the fragments. Translated by Alistair Elliot. Oberon Books. ISBN 978-1-84002-897-3.

=== Editor ===
- Alistair Elliot, ed. (1970). Poems by James I and Others: from a Manuscript Miscellany in Newcastle University Library. Eagle Press. ISBN 978-0-9500358-5-7.
