= Unicorn Theatre =

Children's theatre in London, England

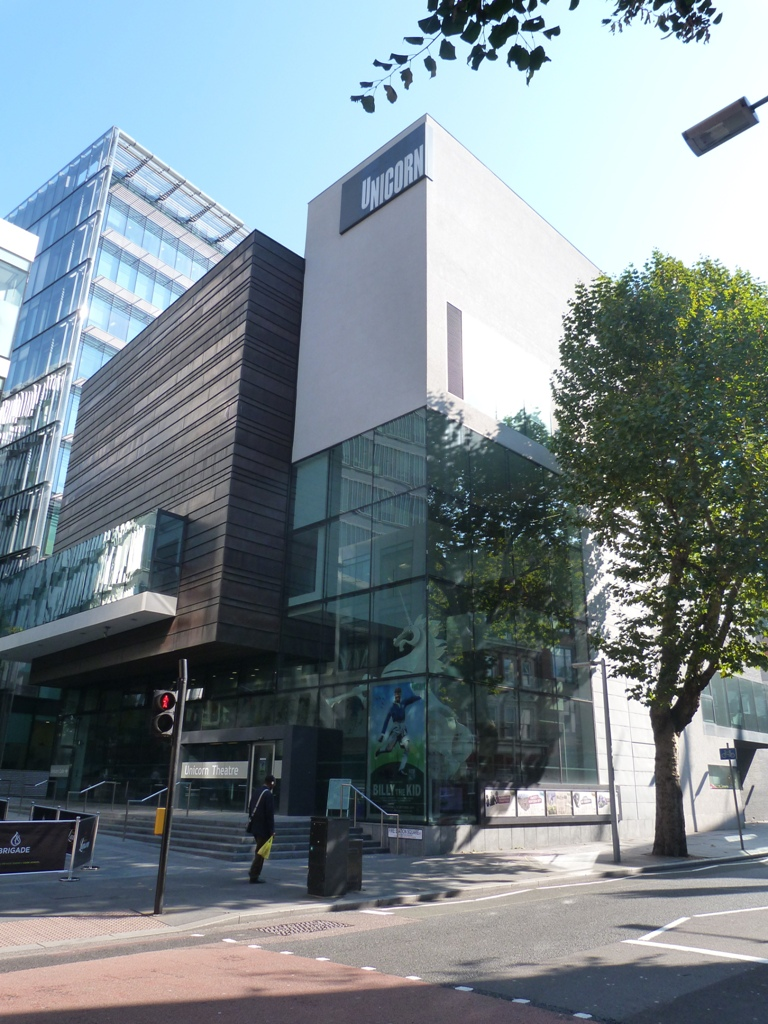
- Unicorn Theatre

- Location within Central London
- Address: Tooley Street; London, SE1; United Kingdom
- Coordinates: 51.504496°N 0.081677°W
- Owner: Unicorn Trust
- Capacity: 290–seat (main); 100–seat (studio theatre)
- Type: Receiving and producing house
- Production: Guest productions
- Public transit: London Bridge

Construction
- Opened: 2005; 21 years ago
- Architect: Keith Williams

Website
- unicorntheatre.com

The Unicorn Theatre is a children's theatre in the London Borough of Southwark, in England. It is a custom-built, RIBA Award–winning building on Tooley Street, which opened in 2005. The theatre was designed by Keith Williams, built by Arup and comprises two theatre spaces (the Weston and Clore Theatres), an education studio, rehearsal space, café and the John Lyon meeting room.

The theatre was founded in 1949, by Caryl Jenner, originally as a mobile theatre; In 1961, Jenner began presenting children's productions at the Arts Theatre in the West End, and in 1967 the company took over the lease of the theatre which then became Unicorn's permanent performing base until 1999; during this period the normal run of adult performances continued during the evenings.

The Unicorn is a registered charity and is an Arts Council England National Portfolio organisation.

== Origins ==
From 1944 Caryl Jenner wrote Christmas pantomimes for small-time playhouses. During performances she would make note of the behaviour of the children, recording what scenes and sequences held their attention, and which did not.

In November 1949 Caryl Jenner created the Mobile Theatre Ltd. Jenner's mission was to drive around the towns of Britain, as well as isolated villages to bring theatre to new audiences. They supplemented their income by performing to adults in the evenings. In 1962, the name changed again, to the Unicorn Theatre Club. In 1967, the company gave up touring having received an annual grant from the Arts Council, took up the lease at the Arts Theatre in London, which remained its home until the present Unicorn Theatre was built in 2005. Jenner died on 29 January 1973 at the age of 55.

== Presidents ==
The current president is Juliet Stevenson, who took over from Sir Alan Ayckbourn CBE in 2007.

== Artistic directors ==
- Caryl Jenner (1947–1973)
- Matyelok Gibbs (1973–1977)
- Nicholas Barter (1977–1986)
- Chris Wallis (1986–1990)
- Richard Williams (1990–1997)
- Tony Graham (1997–2011)
- Purni Morell (2011–2017)
- Justin Audibert (2018–2023)
- Rachel Bagshaw (from 2023)

== Gallery ==
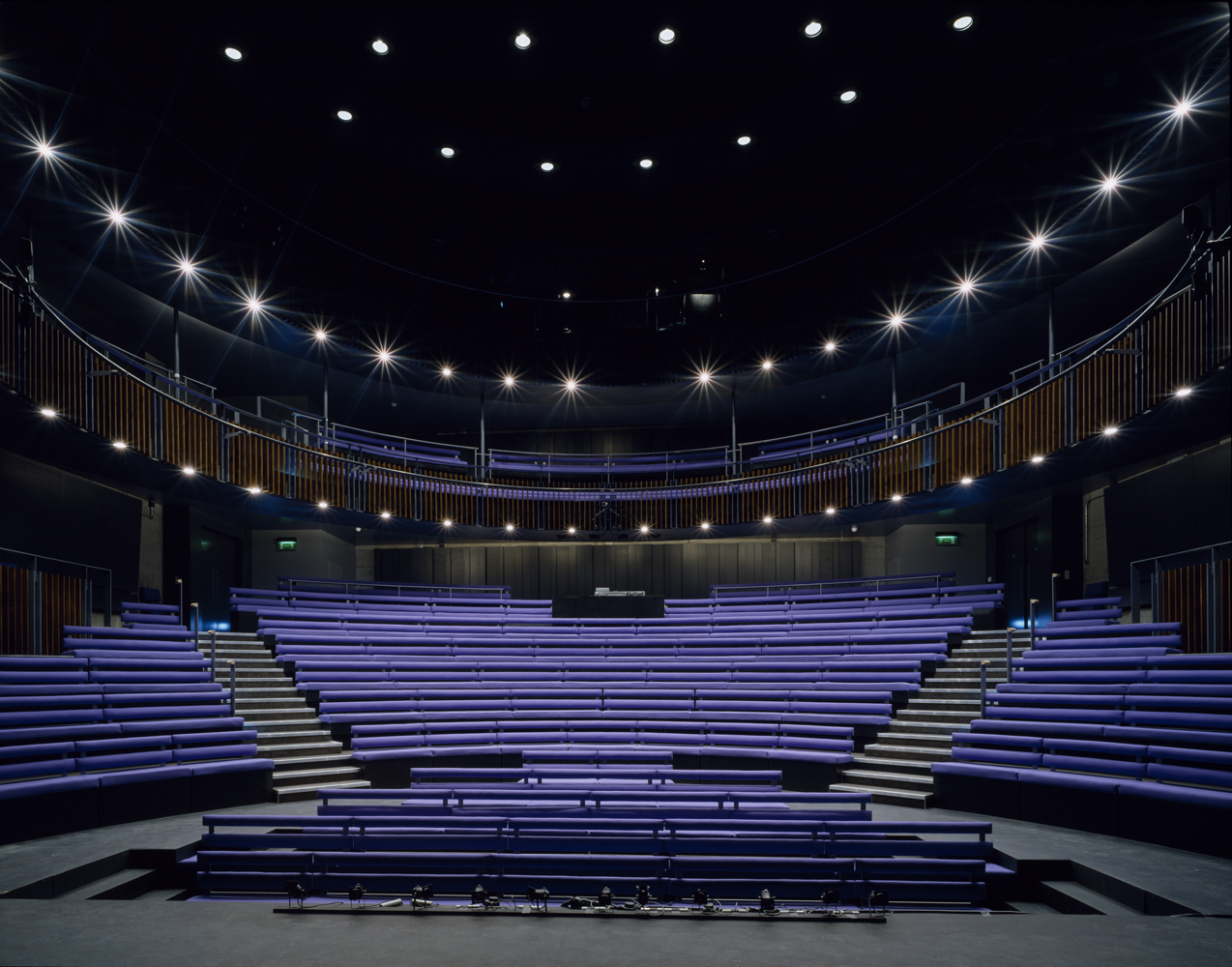
The Weston Theatre, the Unicorn's main stage, seating approximately 290.

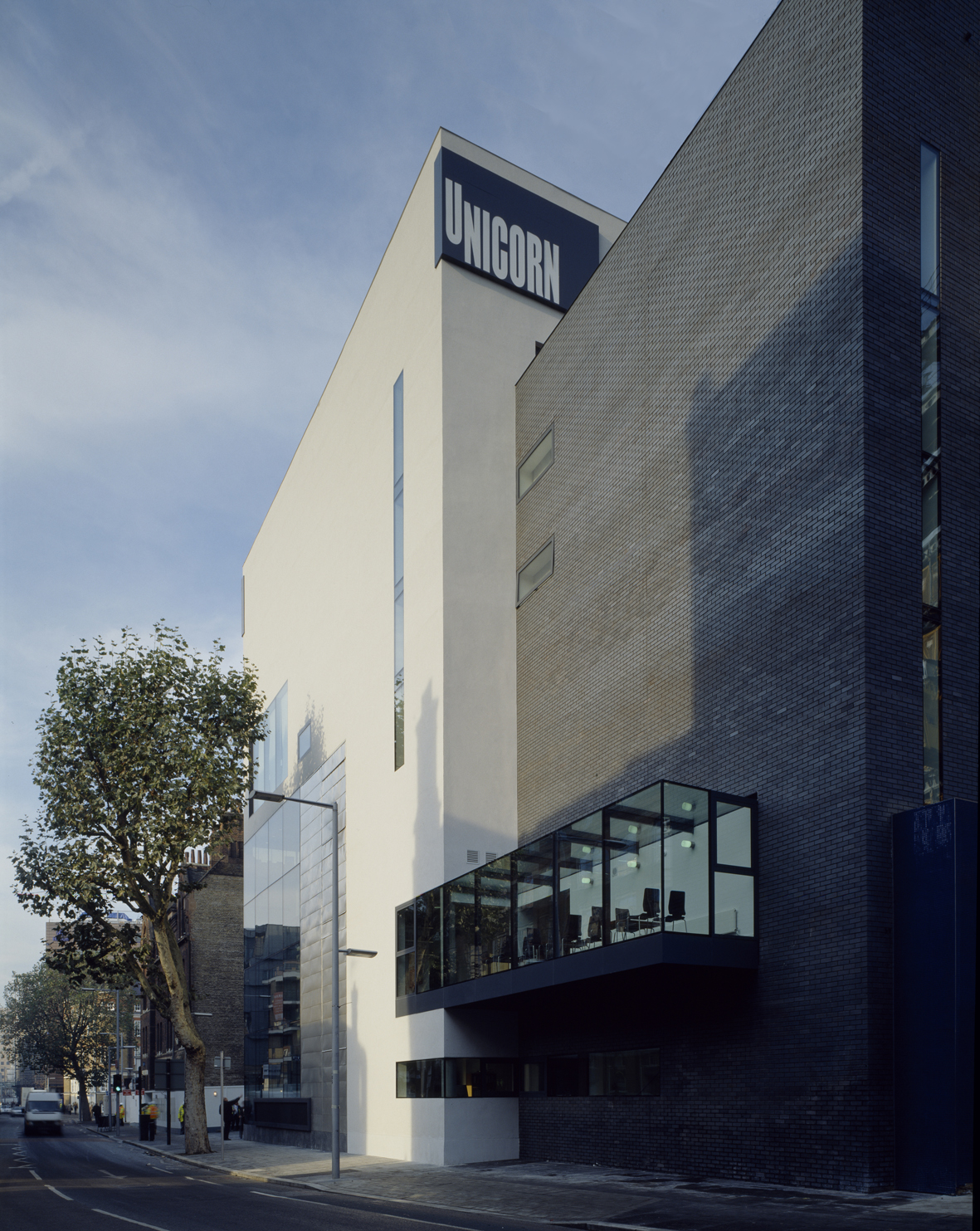
Exterior of the Unicorn Theatre designed by Keith Williams.

== Sources ==
- The Oxford Companion to the Theatre, Phyllis Hartnoll (ed), Oxford, 1983. ISBN 0-19-211546-4.
