= Zurab Gegenava =

Georgian businessman and public figure

- ზურაბ გეგენავა
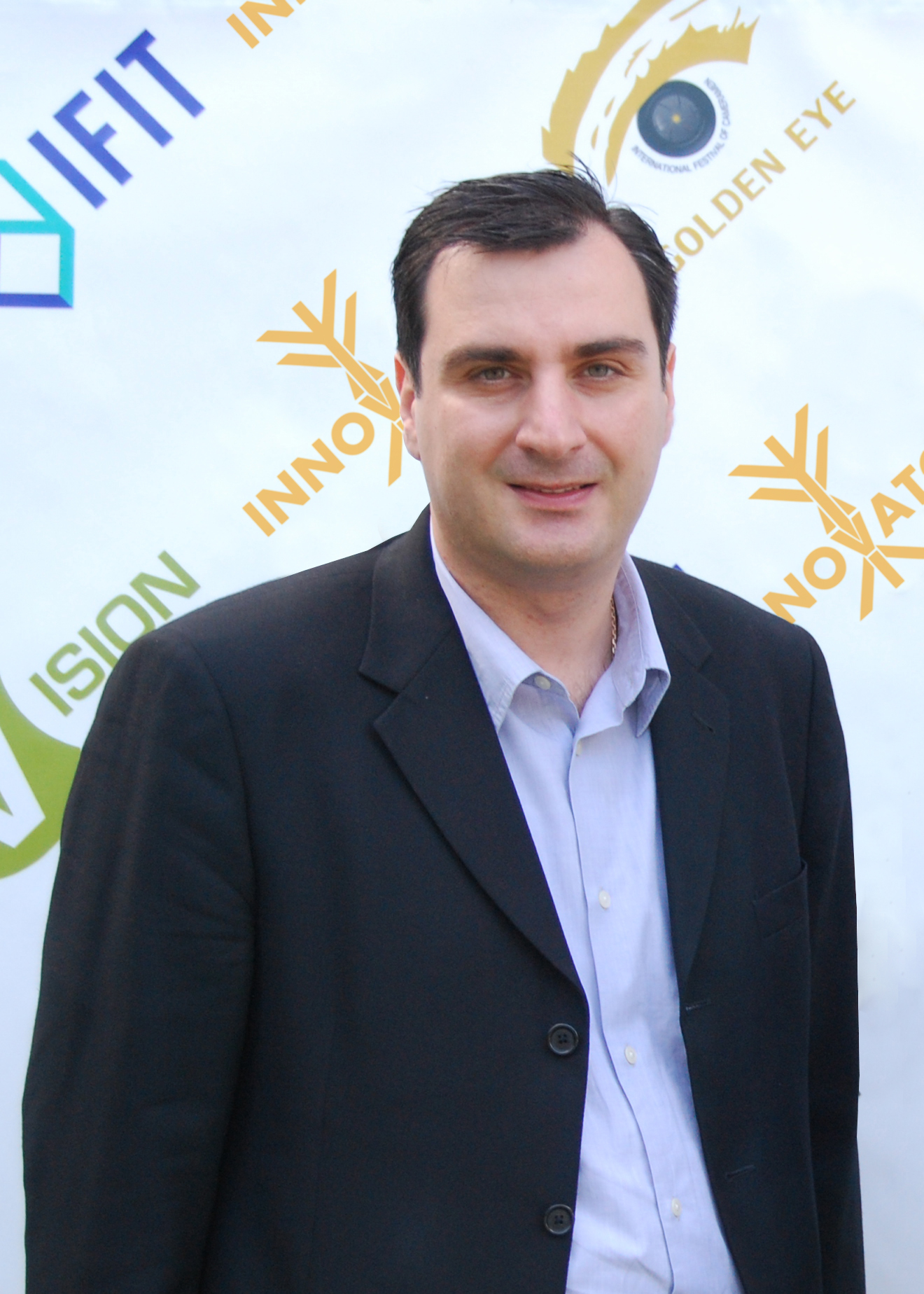
- Zurab Gegenava at the Festival of Golden Eye in Georgia, 2010
- Born: January 23, 1973 (age 53); Tbilisi, Georgia
- Education: Georgian Technical University
- Organization: Innovator
- Known for: Festival "Golden Eye"
- Website: innovator.ge

Zurab Gegenava (Georgian: ზურაბ გეგენავა) – (Born January 23, 1973, Tbilisi) – is a Georgian businessman and a public figure. He is a general director of the company Innovator, the founder of the International Festival of Movie and TV Cameramen "Golden Eye" and the founder of the International Foundation for Innovative Technologies (IFIT). He has a wife and two children.

== Biography ==
Zurab Gegenava was born on January 23, 1973, in Tbilisi. In 1995 he graduated from Georgian Technical University, the faculty of Economics and Management.

1993 – 1995 – the coordinator of the program "Remembrance" at the International Foundation of Georgian Youth;

1994–1996 – the vice-president of the international TV festival "Mana"; from 1995 to 1996, he worked as an assistant of vice-premier at Municipality of Tbilisi.

1996–1997 – the assistant of the Deputy of State Minister at Georgian State Chancellery;

2000– 2003 – the head of Secretariat for chairman of Georgian TV-Radio Broadcasting;

2003–2004 – head of the Administration at Georgian TV-Radio Broadcasting;

2004– 2005 – head of technical department at Georgian Public Broadcaster;

2005–2006 – the director of service center at Georgian Public Broadcaster.

In 2006, he founded company "Innovator" (former "Indent"), which is working in broadcasting field and its main directions are distribution of modern broadcasting equipment, system integration, warranty and post warranty services.

In 2010 he founded International Foundation for Innovative Technologies (IFIT). The main mission of the foundation is to support the implementation of modern innovative trends in Georgia and the Caucasus Region.

In 2009, he founded the International Festival of Movie and TV Cameramen "Golden Eye". The main goal of the festival is to motivate cameramen and people working in the TV and movie industry and to support their further professional growth.

In 2014, he founded International Exhibition of Broadcast Equipment, which took place in the frames of the festival "Golden Eye". It is noteworthy that this is the first time for Georgia to host such exhibition.

== Professional career ==
Zurab Gegenava founded the company Innovator (former Indent) in 2005. The company works in the broadcasting field, its main directions are distribution of modern broadcasting equipment, system integration, warranty and post warranty services.

In 2010, he founded the International Foundation for Innovative Technologies (IFIT). The main mission of the foundation is to support the implementation of modern innovative trends in Georgia and the Caucasus Region.

In 2009, he founded the International Festival of Movie and TV Cameramen "Golden Eye". The main goal of the festival is to motivate the cameramen and people working in TV and movie industry and to support their further professional growth. In 2014 for the first time, "Golden Eye" festival also hosted the 1st International Exhibition of Broadcast Equipment.
