= Michèle Gavazzi =

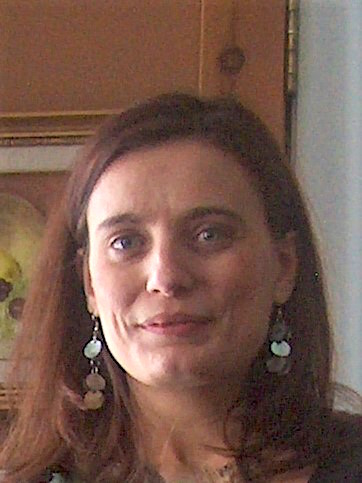
- Gavazzi in 2009
- Born: January 19, 1973 (age 53); Montevideo, Uruguay
- Occupation: author
- Writing career
- Language: French
- Period: 2005–
- Genres: Children's fiction, fantasy, science fiction

Michèle Gavazzi (born January 19, 1973) is a Uruguayan-born Canadian writer of children's literature, living in the Outaouais region of Quebec.

== Biography ==
Gavazzi was born on January 19, 1973, in Montevideo, Uruguay. A year later, her family moved to Italy, her father's country of origin, before moving again to the Canadian province of Quebec in 1976. She grew up there and, under the insistence of her parents, studied fundamental sciences at Cégep de l'Outaouais, then obtained a Bachelor of Arts in Modern Languages and Literature at the University of Ottawa in 1998. It was thanks to her children that she began to write in 2005, because she wanted to show them a different kind of romance.

== Awards ==
In 2008, Gavazzi won the Prix Jeunesse des univers parallèles for her novel Nessy Names. The Curse of Tiens.

== Bibliography ==
Nessy Names series

- La Malédiction de Tiens (2006)
- La Terre sans mal (2007)
- Le Pachakuti (2007)

Eva, elfe des eaux series

- L'Héritage d'Isabella (2008)
- Le Plan de Ka'al (2008)
- Le Fils de Gaëlle (2008)

Iris series

- La Prophétie de la tisserande (2009)
- Les Artisans de vie (2009)
- La Prison du Chaos (2009)

Aria series

- La Cigüe (2010)
- Les Apôtres de Frank (2010)
- Immortalité (2010)
