= Caryl Jenner =

- Born: Pamela Penelope Ripman; 19 May 1917; London
- Died: 29 January 1973 (aged 55); Middlesex Hospital
- Occupation: theatre director
- Known for: children's theatre

Caryl Jenner born Pamela Penelope Ripman (19 May 1917 – 29 January 1973) was a British theatre director and manager. She is known for her work in creating theatre for children.

== Life ==
Jenner was born in London where her name was Pamela Penelope Ripman. Her parents were Constance Brockwill Grier and Walter Ripman. Her father wrote school textbooks on French and German and he worked as a school inspector. She was educated at Norland Place School and then at St Paul's Girls' School in Hammersmith before more specialised training at the Royal Central School of Speech and Drama emerging with a diploma in 1935.

Her first work was at the Gate Theatre in London and she then moved on to work in other theatres around London.

The Amersham Playhouse had been created by John Penrose and Sally Latimer in 1936. Penrose soon left and Latimer continued to be joined by Jenner in 1938. The two of them would run the theatre until 1949 creating over 200 productions. During the war there was eleven performances per week. In March 1949 the theatre's governors decided that it was no longer financially viable.

In November 1949 Caryl Jenner created the Mobile Theatre Ltd to allow a small company to take theatre to children. They supplemented their income by performing to adults in the evenings. In 1960 her business had five touring companies of actors and four of these were devoted to children's theatre.

In 1962, the name changed again, to the Unicorn Theatre Club. In 1967, the company gave up touring having received an annual grant from the Arts Council, took up the lease at the Arts Theatre in London.

== Death and legacy ==
Jenner died on 29 January 1973 at the age of 55 in Middlesex Hospital from lung cancer. Jenner had campaigned for a purpose built children's theatre on the South Bank in London. The children's theatre continued at the Arts Theatre until the purpose built Unicorn Theatre for children was completed in 2005. The theatre had cost £13m pounds and decades of work and Jenner's contribution was identified as key to its creation.
