= List of rediscovered films =

List of films that were thought lost but later rediscovered

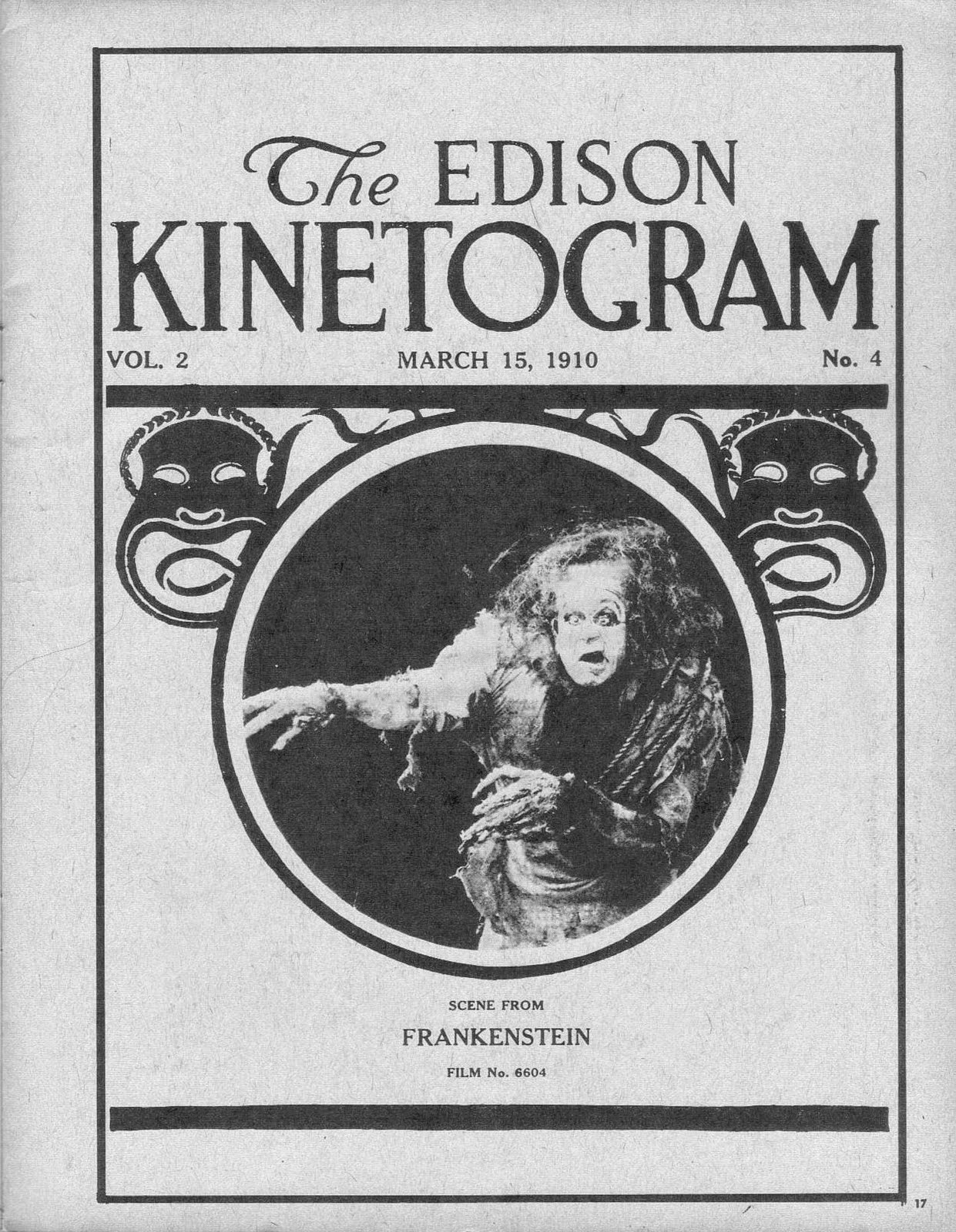
Frankenstein (1910), the first film adaptation of Mary Shelley's Frankenstein. A print was discovered in the mid-1970s.

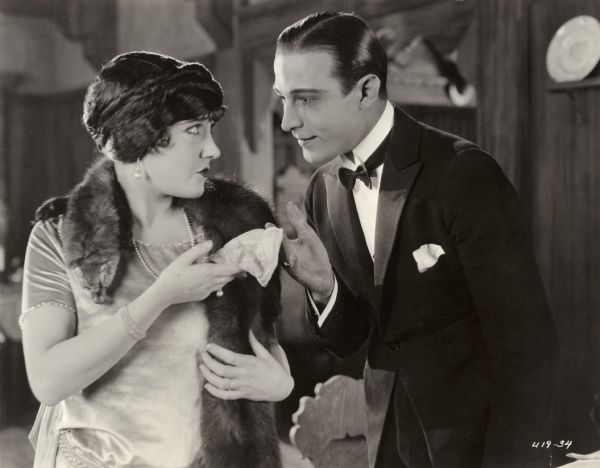
Beyond the Rocks (1922), the film starring Rudolph Valentino and Gloria Swanson. A print was discovered in 2003.

This is a list of rediscovered films that, once thought lost, have since been discovered, in whole or in part. See List of incomplete or partially lost films and List of rediscovered film footage for films that are not wholly lost.

For a film that was not released before it was rediscovered, the year is when it was produced. The year is also italicized.

The films are listed by year, then alphabetically within each year.

== Silent films ==
Many films of the silent era have been lost. The Library of Congress estimates 75% of all silent films are lost forever. About 10,919 American silent films were produced, but only 2,749 of them still exist in some complete form, either as an original American 35 mm version, a foreign release, or as a lower-quality copy.

=== 1890s ===
Year	Film	Director	Cast	Notes	Ref
1896	Défense d'afficher	Georges Méliès	Georges Méliès	This French film was recovered in 2004. It is the oldest lost film to be rediscovered.	
1896	The House of the Devil	Georges Méliès	Georges Méliès	The film was presumed lost until 1988, when a copy was found in the New Zealand Film Archive.	
1897	Gugusse and the Automaton	Georges Méliès	Georges Méliès	Unexpectedly identified in Library of Congress donation in February 2026.	
1898	Something Good – Negro Kiss	William Selig	Saint Suttle, Gertie Brown	The nitrate film negative of this short was rediscovered at an estate sale in Louisiana by an archivist from the University of Southern California. It is believed to contain the earliest on-screen kiss involving African Americans and is noted for departing from the prevalent and purely stereotypical presentation of racist caricature in popular culture at the time.	
1899	Momijigari	Shibata Tsunekichi	Onoe Kikugorō V, Ichikawa Danjūrō IX	A three-minute print was discovered around 1939 by the film historian Junichiro Tanaka, who bought the print for 50 yen; it was later acquired by the National Film Archive of Japan. Around 2006, a six-minute print was donated to the National Film Archive of Japan by film historian Motoki Yoshihiko.	

=== 1900s ===
Year	Film	Director	Cast	Notes	Ref
1900	Sherlock Holmes Baffled	Arthur Marvin	The names of the two actors are unknown.	Running only 30 seconds, this is the first recorded detective film and the first to feature Sherlock Holmes. A paper copy was identified in 1968 in the Library of Congress Paper Print archive by Michael Pointer, a historian of Sherlock Holmes films. It was transferred to 16 mm film in the Library of Congress collection.	
1901	The Death of Poor Joe	George Albert Smith	Laura Bayley	Made in Great Britain and lost since 1954, the film was rediscovered in 2012 and is the oldest surviving film that features a Charles Dickens character.	
1901	The Triple-Headed Lady	Georges Méliès		Short film rediscovered as part of the Brinton Entertainment traveling circuit of early films and magic lantern slides salvaged in Iowa in 1981, but not identified until 2015 and featured in the 2017 documentary Saving Brinton.	
1904	A Wager Between Two Magicians, or Jealous of Myself	Georges Méliès		Two minute-long film discovered in 2016 at the Czech National Film Archive under a donated reel with a different name.	
1904	The Wonderful Rose-Tree	Georges Méliès		Short film rediscovered as part of the Brinton Entertainment traveling circuit of early films and magic lantern slides salvaged in Iowa in 1981, but not identified until 2017 upon release of the documentary Saving Brinton.	
1904 or 1906	Living London or The Streets of London	Charles Urban		One reel (10 minutes) was found of this documentary of London life. The National Film and Sound Archive of Australia (where the fragment was found) states it was identified by British film scholar Ian Christie as being from Living London, but Urban's website claims that this is from the later documentary.	
1907	Katsudō Shashin	Unknown		The oldest animated film in Japan, lasting only three seconds. The piece of film was discovered in Kyoto on July 31, 2005.	
1908	Bobby's Kodak	Wallace McCutcheon	Edward Dillon, Robert Harron	A print was discovered in the Library of Congress in 2016.	
1908	Hôtel électrique (El hotel eléctrico)	Segundo de Chomón	Segundo de Chomón, Julienne Mathieu	This French film is in the Filmoteca Española film archive.	

=== 1910s ===
Year	Film	Director	Cast	Notes	Ref
1910	Frankenstein	J. Searle Dawley	Charles Ogle	A print was bought by a film collector in the 1950s, who was not aware of its rarity until decades later. United States	
1910	Il Guanto (The Glove)	Luigi Maggi	Alberto Capozzi, Mary Cleo Tarlarini, Mario Voller-Buzzi	A print bought by a private collector from a recycling centre. United Kingdom. (2015)	
1911	The Adventures of Pinocchio	Giulio Antamoro	Ferdinand Guillaume	In 1994, the original negative was rediscovered at Cineteca Italiana in Milan. In 2002, Time reported that a 30-minute version had been rediscovered and restored.	
1911	Karađorđe	Ilija Stanojević-Čiča		The first Serbian feature film, thought lost since 1928. Material from this movie was found in the Austrian Film Archives in 2003.	
1911	Pictureland	Thomas H. Ince	Isabel Rea King Baggot	The film was rediscovered by a researcher, Robert Hoskin, in Australia who received a print from Japan in 2015 and personally restored it over the course of one year. When the film was thought to be lost it was said that Mary Pickford played a role in it, but after a print was found it became clear that she was not in the film at all. The part that was thought to have been played by her was actually played by Isabel Rea.	
1911	Their First Misunderstanding	Thomas H. Ince, George Loane Tucker	Mary Pickford	The first film that credited Pickford by name. Found in 2006 in a New Hampshire barn.	
1912	A Fool and His Money	Alice Guy-Blaché William Haines		United States	
1912	From the Manger to the Cross	Sidney Olcott	Robert Henderson-Bland	The film disappeared from cinema screens for decades until Reverend Brian Hession, vicar of Holy Trinity Church in Walton, Aylesbury, Buckinghamshire, went on a quest to the US to find a copy of the film for re-issue in Britain. Although initially disappointed, he eventually discovered a set of negatives after searching in the vaults and cellars of old film concerns. Hession added a musical sound track and spoken commentary, and From the Manger to the Cross was re-released in 1938.	
1912	A Lucky Holdup		Dorothy Gibson	It was found by David Navone in the early 2000s in a sea chest that he bought at a California flea market and was professionally restored by the American Film Institute. It is the only surviving film featuring actress Dorothy Gibson.	
1912	In Nacht und Eis	Mime Misu		The third Titanic movie was presumed lost around 1914, but was found in the possession of a private film collector in Germany in 1998.	
1912	Richard III	André Calmettes, James Keane	Robert Gemp, Frederick Warde	The first known full-length William Shakespeare film was thought to be lost, until in 1996 Oregon projectionist William Buffum donated his copy to the American Film Institute.	
1912	En Stærkere magt	Hjalmar Davidsen, Eduard Schnedler-Sørensen	Valda Valkyrien	Preserved by the Danish Film Institute.	
1913	Laenatud naene (Borrowed Wife)		Alfred Sällik, Paul Pinna	Found in Gosfilmofond Archive (Moscow) in 2014, this comedy is probably the oldest surviving Estonian feature film.	
1913	L'enfant de Paris	Léonce Perret	Léonce Perret, Louis Leubas, Maurice Lagrenée	The film was found by Henri Langlois.	
1913	Os Óculos do Vovô	Francisco Santos	Francisco Santos, Mário Ferreira dos Santos	Oldest Brazilian fiction film. Rediscovered by researcher Antônio Jesus Pfeil in 1970/80s. Four minutes of the 15-minute feature are preserved.	
1913	Poor Jake's Demise	Allen Curtis	Lon Chaney, Louise Fazenda	Chaney's first credited role. A fragment was discovered in 2006 among several hundred other reels of film in an English collection.	
1913	Sealed Hearts	Ralph Ince	Eugene O’Brien	UK collector had tinted 35mm print (50 minute British version).	
1913	A Sister to Carmen	Charles Gaskill	Helen Gardner	Silver nitrate positive print recovered in 1996.	
1913	When Lincoln Paid	Francis Ford	Francis Ford	Was found in 2006 in a barn in New Hampshire that was going to be demolished.	
1914	The Active Life of Dolly of the Dailies	Walter Edwin	Mary Fuller, Yale Boss	Discovered in 2009 in the New Zealand Film Archive.	
1914	The Girl Stage Driver	Webster Cullison	Norbert A. Myles, Edna Payne, Will E. Sheerer	An incomplete 35mm positive print was discovered in 2009 in the New Zealand Film Archive.	
1914	Der Hund von Baskerville (The Hound of the Baskervilles)	Rudolf Meinert		First known adaptation of the Sherlock Holmes book The Hound of the Baskervilles.	
1914	The Oath of the Sword	Frank Shaw		Considered the earliest known Asian American film production, it was recently discovered at the George Eastman Museum by scholar Denise Khor.	
1914	The Oubliette	Charles Giblyn	Murdock MacQuarrie, Pauline Bush, Lon Chaney, Doc Crane, Chester Withey, Millard K. Wilson, Frank Lanning, Agnes Vernon	In the summer of 1983, a nitrate print in excellent condition was discovered in Georgia. A couple rebuilding the steps of their front porch uncovered all three reels of the film, still in their metal cans.	
1914	Pirates of the Plains	Otis Thayer		Discovered in 1993 in a private collection in Antigo, Wisconsin. It is thought to be the only film made by the Colorado Motion Picture Company to have survived.	
1914	Salomy Jane	William Nigh, Lucius Henderson	Beatriz Michelena, House Peters	Complete nitrate copy found in Australia in 1996.	
1914	The Stain	Frank Powell	Edward José, Theda Bara	A print of the film was discovered in Australia in the 1990s.	
1914	A Thief Catcher		Charlie Chaplin (bit part)	A print was discovered in 2010 at a Michigan antique sale.	
1914	Won in a Closet	Mabel Normand	Mabel Normand	Discovered in 2009 in the New Zealand Film Archive.	
1915	Diplomatic Henry	Sidney Drew	Sidney Drew, Mrs. Sidney Drew, Florence Natol	Discovered in the summer of 2017, it was scanned and restored at the University of Southern California and screened at the 2018 Pordenone Silent Film Festival.	
1915	The Heart of Lincoln	Francis Ford	Francis Ford	Found in Lauro's Historic Films Archive in Greenport, Long Island, New York in 2024.	
1915	A Mixup for Mazie	Hal Roach	Harold Lloyd	Found in Gosfilmofond Archive (Moscow) in 2017.	
1915	A Munkászubbony (The Work Jacket)	István Bródy	Gyula Hegedűs	Found in the Netherlands in 2017.	
1915	Peculiar Patients' Pranks	Hal Roach	Harold Lloyd	Found in Australia's National Film and Sound Archive.	
1915	The Portage Trail	Oliver William Lamb	Residents from Akron, Ohio	A 16-minute drama shot in Akron, Ohio, that was considered lost until Los Angeles-based Periscope Film LLC posted it for online viewing via YouTube in January, 2023.	
1915	The Price of Betrayal	Victor Sjöström	Egil Eide, John Ekman	Found by the Centre national du cinéma et de l'image animée in 2017.	
1915	Regeneration	Raoul Walsh	Rockliffe Fellowes, Anna Q. Nilsson	Rediscovered by the Museum of Modern Art.	
1916	Als ich tot war	Ernst Lubitsch		Found in 1994 in a Slovenian archive by the Ljubljana Film Museum and screened at the Pordenone Festival of Silent Cinema in 1995.	
1916	East Lynne	Bertram Bracken	Theda Bara	One of Bara's six surviving films.	
1916	Luke's Double	Hal Roach	Harold Lloyd, Bebe Daniels	A 28mm print of the long-lost short comedy was recovered by the Harold Lloyd Estate in October 2022 and has been deposited at the UCLA Film & Television Archive for preservation.	
1916	The Moment Before	Robert G. Vignola	Pauline Frederick	A nearly complete print, lacking only the opening scene, was found in an archive in Rome.	
1916	Mysteriet natten till den 25:e	Georg af Klercker			
1916	The Net	George Foster Platt	Bert Delaney, Marian Swayne	On April 5, 2022, Thanhouser Company Film Preservation, Inc in cooperation with the National Library of Norway announced the discovery of this rare surviving five-reel feature film.	
1916	Purity	Rae Berger	Audrey Munson	The Centre Nation de la Cinematographie film archive has a print.	
1916	Sherlock Holmes	Arthur Berthelet	William Gillette, Marjorie Kay	A copy was discovered in 2014 in the Cinémathèque Française archive. This is the only film made by Gillette, a famed stage actor best known for his portrayal of Holmes.	
1916	Snow White	J. Searle Dawley	Marguerite Clark, Creighton Hale	It was thought to have been destroyed in a vault fire. A "substantially complete" print, with Dutch intertitles and missing a few scenes, was found in Amsterdam in 1992 and restored at George Eastman House. It inspired Walt Disney to make it the subject of his first feature-length animated film.	
1916	Zepped		Charlie Chaplin	A copy of this propaganda short film was found in 2009; and a second turned up in 2011.	
c. 1916 or 1917	The Curse of Quon Gwon: When the Far East Mingles with the West	Marion E. Wong	Violet Wong, Harvey Soohoo	Filmed c. 1916 or 1917, apparently never released and long thought lost. Restored in 2006 by the Academy Film Archive from two reels preserved by filmmaker Arthur Dong. It is the earliest known Chinese-American feature film, and one of the earliest films directed by a woman. Parts of this are still missing.	
1917	Bliss	Alfred J. Goulding	Harold Lloyd	Found in 1978 in Dawson City, Yukon, Canada.	
1917	Bucking Broadway	John Ford		Found in 2002 in a French archive. Included as an extra on the Criterion Collection Blu-ray of Stagecoach.	
1917	The Dull Sword	Jun'ichi Kōuchi		The Japanese animated film was found in an antique shop in Osaka in March 2008.	
1917	Pay Me! (The Vengeance of the West)	Joe De Grasse	Lon Chaney	Found in Gosfilmofond Archive (Moscow) in 2019.	
1917	Polly of the Circus	Edwin L. Hollywood	Mae Marsh	The original copy was destroyed in the 1965 MGM vault fire and was considered lost for 13 years until another copy was found in 1978 in Dawson City, Yukon, Canada.	
1917	A Reckless Romeo	Roscoe Arbuckle	Roscoe Arbuckle, Al St. John	Found in an unmarked canister at the Norwegian Film Institute in 1998, alongside The Cook.	
1918	Amazonas, o maior rio do mundo	Silvino Santos		Documentary movie about the Amazon rainforest lost between 1920s-1930s and only found out in 2023 stored in the Národní filmový archiv, mistacalogued as a 1925 US film.	
1918	Anniversary of the Revolution	Dziga Vertov	Lev Trozki	Edited by director Dziga Vertov (marking his first film) from chronicle materials on the first anniversary of the October Revolution. The film was considered lost for a long time and was restored in its original form a century after its release by film expert Nikolai Izvolov. The premiere took place on November 20, 2018, at the International Documentary Film Festival in Amsterdam (IDFA).	
1918	The Cook	Roscoe Arbuckle	Roscoe Arbuckle, Buster Keaton	Found in an unmarked canister at the Norwegian Film Institute in 1998, alongside A Reckless Romeo. A second print, containing more footage, was found in 2002, and the two were combined to create a restored version. However, some scenes are still missing.	
1918	The Floor Below	Clarence G. Badger	Mabel Normand, Tom Moore, Helen Dahl	Found "in the estate of a Dutch collector" by the Nederlands Filmmuseum.	
1918	Kicking the Germ Out of Germany	Alfred J. Goulding	Harold Lloyd	Print with Italian intertitles found in the Museo Nazionale Scienza e Tecnologia Leonardo da Vinci in Milan, Italy in 2025.	
1919	Around the World in 80 Days	Richard Oswald	Conrad Veidt	Print found at the EYE film Institute in the Netherlands	
1919	Back to God's Country	David Hartford	Nell Shipman	Print discovered in Europe and restored in the 1990s. Scenario by Nell Shipman and novelist James Oliver Curwood.	
1919	Camping Out	Roscoe Arbuckle	Roscoe Arbuckle, Al St. John	Reconstructed from reels found in the Nederlands Filmmuseum and Cineteca Nazionale (Rome) storage vaults in 2002.	
1919	Different from the Others	Richard Oswald	Conrad Veidt	German copies destroyed by the Nazis in 1933 and thought lost since then. A copy was found in Ukraine in the late 1970s and restored by the Stadtmuseum München. One of the earliest known sympathetic depictions of homosexuality in film.	
1919	The Grim Game	Irvin Willat	Harry Houdini	Although fragments of the movie were known to have survived, this was widely considered to be a lost film until it was purchased from a private collector in 2014. It was scheduled to be screened at the TCM Classic Film Festival in March 2015.	
1919	People Die for Metal	Alexandre Volkoff	Zoya Karabanova, Yuri Yurovsky	This film was considered lost until being rediscovered and shown at a Danish film festival in 1963. The version screened there had German credits and carried the alternate title Sold Soul. It was later restored and uploaded to YouTube.	
1919	A Romance of Happy Valley	D. W. Griffith	Lillian Gish	It was found in the State Film Archives of the Soviet Union, which donated it to the Museum of Modern Art.	
1919	Scarlet Days	D. W. Griffith	Richard Barthelmess, Eugenie Besserer	Found in the State Film Archives of the Soviet Union, which donated it to the Museum of Modern Art.	
1919	Sealed Hearts	Ralph Ince	Eugene O'Brien, Robert Edeson, Lucille Lee Stewart	The previously lost film was rediscovered in the United Kingdom after a film collector provided his copy to the De Montfort University’s Cinema and Television History Institute.	
1919	The Loves of Letty	Frank Lloyd	Leota Lorraine, Joan Standing, Pauline Frederick	Found in a European collection.	
1919	The Spiders (1st of 2)	Fritz Lang	Carl de Vogt, Ressel Orla, Georg John, Lil Dagover	Restored in 1978 from a newly discovered original print, first part of a 2-part series.	
1919	The Valley of the Giants	James Cruze	Wallace Reid	Found in Gosfilmofond Russian state archives, Moscow. Digital copy given to the Library of Congress in 2010.	
1919	When Bearcat Went Dry	Oliver L. Sellers	Lon Chaney	Found in a projectionist's collection.	
1919	The White Heather	Maurice Tourneur	Holmes Herbert, John Gilbert, Gibson Gowland	Considered to be a lost film for many years, but in 2023 a copy was rediscovered at the Eye Filmmuseum. The film will be preserved by the San Francisco Silent Film Festival under a grant awarded by the National Film Preservation Foundation.	
1919	The Wicked Darling	Tod Browning	Lon Chaney	A copy was found in Europe in the 1990s, and now resides in the Nederlands Filmmuseum.	
1919	The Witness for the Defense	George Fitzmaurice	Elsie Ferguson	Print discovered in Gosfilmofond. Screened at Univ. of North Dakota. Ferguson's only surviving silent film.	
1919	You're Fired	James Cruze	Wallace Reid, Wanda Hawley	Found in Russian state archives Gosfilmofond, Moscow. Digital copy given to the Library of Congress in 2010.	

=== 1920s ===
Year	Film	Director	Cast	Notes	Ref
1920	Aimsir Padraig	Norman Whitten	Vernon Whitten, Gilbert Greene, Ira Allen	Also known as "In the Days of St. Patrick", exists in the British Film Institute.	
1920	Algol	Hans Werckmeister	Emil Jannings, John Gottowt, Käthe Haack, Hanna Ralph	Recovered and subsequently screened by The Museum of Modern Art on November 29, 2010, as part of their film exhibition Weimar Cinema, 1919–1933: Daydreams and Nightmares.	
1920	The Daughter of Dawn	Norbert Myles	White Parker, Wanada Parker, Esther LeBarre, Jack Sankadoty	Bought and restored by the Oklahoma Historical Society in 2007.	
1920	Dance on the Volcano (Der Tanz auf dem Vulkan)	Richard Eichberg	Lee Parry, Violette Napierska, Robert Scholz, Bela Lugosi	Found in a film archive in the 1990s, albeit in its American release version.	
1920	Genuine	Robert Wiene	Fern Andra, Hans Heinrich von Twardowski	Complete copy was discovered in the Berlin film archive.	
1920	Go and Get It	Marshall Neilan, Henry Roberts Symonds	Pat O'Malley, Wesley Barry, Agnes Ayres	Thought lost until a print was discovered in the Cineteca Italiana film archive in Italy.	
1920	Helen of Four Gates	Cecil Hepworth	Alma Taylor; James Carew	Found in a film vault in Quebec, Canada in 2008. However, footage from the film had been excerpted in the 1995 documentary Cinema Europe: The Other Hollywood.	
1920	If I Were King	J. Gordon Edwards	William Farnum, Betty Ross Clarke, Fritz Leiber, Sr.	Print is held by the Library of Congress.	
1920	The Spiders (2nd of 2)	Fritz Lang	Carl de Vogt, Ressel Orla, Georg John	Restored in 1978 from a newly discovered original print, second part of a 2-part series.	
1920	Unseen Forces	Sidney Franklin	Sylvia Breamer, Conrad Nagel, Sam De Grasse	Rediscovered at the New Zealand Film Archive in 2010. A video of the preserved film can be viewed at the National Film Preservation Foundation website.	
1920	Der Wildtöter und Chingachgook	Arthur Wellin	Bela Lugosi	Recovered in the 1990s, exists in private film collection.	
1920	Where Are Your Husbands?	Billy B. Van	Billy B. Van	Found in the Library of Congress film archive in June 2017 and was screened at Dexter's Inn in Sunapee, New Hampshire on July 12, 2017.	
1920	Within Our Gates	Oscar Micheaux	Evelyn Preer, Flo Clements. James D. Ruffin	Lost for decades, a single print of the film, entitled La Negra (The Black Woman), was discovered in Spain in the 1970s. In 1993, the Library of Congress Motion Picture Conservation Center restored the film as closely as possible to the original.	
1921	The Blue Fox	Duke Worne	Ann Little, J. Morris Foster	Portions of the first 12 chapters of this serial exist in UCLA Film and Television Archive; parts 13–15 are believed lost.	
1921	Brownie's Little Venus	Fred Fishback	Baby Peggy	Rediscovered in Switzerland in 2010.	
1921	The Conquest of Canaan	Roy William Neill	Thomas Meighan, Doris Kenyon	Found in Russian state archives Gosfilmofond Moscow. Digital copy given to the Library of Congress in 2010.	
1921	The Devil	James Young	George Arliss	Exists in the Library of Congress film archive.	
1921	Hard Luck	Edward F. Cline; Buster Keaton	Buster Keaton	Long considered Keaton's major lost film until it was partially reconstructed in 1987. The climactic final scene was later recovered in a Russian archive.	
1921	Jánošík	Theodor Pištěk; Mária Fábryová	Jaroslav Siakeľ	The first Slovak full feature film was considered lost until 1970, when original film producer John Zavodny donated his copy to Slovak film institute. It was then restored by Ivan Rumanovský and premiered in 1975.	
1921	Ludzie bez jutra (People with no Tomorrow)	Aleksander Hertz		Polish film rediscovered in Germany in 2015.	
1921	Molly O'	F. Richard Jones	Mabel Normand	Prints exist in the Library of Congress film archive, UCLA Film and Television Archive and Gosfilmofond Russian Film Archive.	
1922	Amazonas, o maior rio do mundo	Silvino Santos		This Brazilian documentary of life on the Amazon River was presumed lost in 1931. It was rediscovered in 2023 in the archives of the Czech Film Archive.	
1922	Beyond the Rocks	Sam Wood	Gloria Swanson, Rudolph Valentino	Collector Joop Van Liempd (1913–2002) donated a large collection of film canisters to Nederlands Filmmuseum. A print of Beyond the Rocks was found among them in 2003 and restored in 2005.	
1922	For the Defense	Paul Powell	Ethel Clayton, ZaSu Pitts	Rediscovered in 2014 in the archive of EYE Filmmuseum in Amsterdam.	
1922	Kick In	George Fitzmaurice	Betty Compson; Bert Lytell	Found in Russian state archives; Gosfilmofond (Moscow). Digital copy given to the Library of Congress in 2010.	
1922	Little Red Riding Hood	Walt Disney	animation	One of the first theatrical animated cartoons from Walt Disney. Found in a London film library in 1998 and restored the same year.	
1922	The Loves of Pharaoh	Ernst Lubitsch	Emil Jannings	Long thought lost, it has been restored from various sources, though it still lacks 10 minutes of the roughly one hour and 50-minute original running time.	
1922	Oliver Twist	Frank Lloyd	Jackie Coogan, Lon Chaney	Thought lost for half a century until found in Yugoslavia in the 1970s.	
1922	Our Gang	Charley Chase, Robert F. McGowan, Tom McNamara, Fred C. Newmeyer	Ernest Morrison, John Hatton, Anna Mae Bilson, Jackie Condon, Mickey Daniels, Helen Gilmore, Wallace Howe, Mark Jones, Charley Young	Missing for decades, approximately half of the film resurfaced and was compiled together by 2013, before a nearly complete print was reconstructed from eight different sources in 2024.	
1922	Phantom	F. W. Murnau	Alfred Abel, Grete Berger, Lil Dagover	Prints exist in the Bundesarchiv-Filmarchiv film archive.	
1922	Sherlock Holmes	Albert Parker	John Barrymore, Roland Young, William Powell	Film was restored over a thirty-year period from the original camera negatives at the George Eastman House.	
1922	A Woman's Woman	Charles Giblyn	Mary Alden	Revealed on Instagram that it was found in 2025.	
1922	Three Live Ghosts	George Fitzmaurice	Norman Kerry	Found in a Russian archive and shown publicly at British Silent Film Festival in September 2015.	
1922	The Toll of the Sea	Chester Franklin	Anna May Wong, Kenneth Harlan	Found in 1985.	
1922	The Young Rajah	Phil Rosen	Rudolph Valentino	Film partially found, surviving footage and still pictures were merged to make an incomplete film.	
1923	The Call of the Canyon	Victor Fleming	Richard Dix	Found in Russian state archives; Gosfilmofond (Moscow). Digital copy given to the Library of Congress in 2010.	
1923	Canyon of the Fools	Val Paul	Harry Carey, Marguerite Clayton, Jack Curtis	Found in Russian state archives; Gosfilmofond (Moscow). Digital copy given to the Library of Congress in 2010.	
1923	Circus Days	Edward F. Cline	Jackie Coogan	Found in Russian state archives; Gosfilmofond (Moscow). Digital copy given to the Library of Congress in 2010.	
1923	Defying Destiny	Louis Chaudet	Monte Blue, Irene Rich	Rediscovered in New Zealand Film Archive in 2010. Video of preserved print available for online viewing	
1923	The Gold Diggers	Harry Beaumont	Hope Hampton, Wyndham Standing, Louise Fazenda	With no prints of The Gold Diggers located in any archive it was for decades presumed to be a lost film. In May 2021, a collector found an incomplete nitrate 35mm Belgian print in England, which has been uploaded to YouTube. The surviving footage includes reels 1, 4, 5 and 6, although some of the extant reels have missing sections at the beginning and end of the reels. In June 2021 the same collector uploaded a digitally scanned version of the first five minutes to YouTube, with plans to scan the remaining footage.	
1923	The Eternal Struggle	Reginald Barker	Renée Adorée	Found in Russian state archives; Gosfilmofond (Moscow). Digital copy given to the Library of Congress in 2010.	
1923	The First Degree	Edward Sedgwick	Frank Mayo	Rediscovered in July 2020 in the Charles E. Krosse Collection of the Chicago Film Archives in Chicago, Illinois.	
1923	Love, Life and Laughter	George Pearson	Betty Balfour	Found in a small cinema in the Netherlands in 2014.	
1923	Maytime	Louis J. Gasnier	Clara Bow, Ethel Shannon, Harrison Ford	4 out of 7 reels were found in the New Zealand Film Archive in 2009; preserved and available for online viewing.	
1923	La Montagne infidèle	Jean Epstein	Paul Guichard	A complete 28 mm copy was identified in 2021 at Filmoteca de Catalunya.	
1923	The Pill Pounder	Gregory La Cava	Charles Murray (American actor), Clara Bow	Thought for decades to be lost, filmmaker Gary Huggins recently discovered a 35 mm copy of this 2-reel film after he picked it up in the auction of items from a defunct Omaha-based distributor.	
1923	Souls for Sale	Rupert Hughes	Eleanor Boardman	Discovered and restored in 2006 by Turner Classic Movies and Warner Archive Collection.	
1923	The White Shadow	Graham Cutts	Betty Compson, Clive Brook, Henry Victor, A. B. Imeson	The first three of six reels were found in the New Zealand Film Archive in August 2011.	
1924	Twenty Dollars a Week	F. Harmon Weight	George Arliss, Taylor Holmes, Edith Roberts	Held in the Library of Congress Film Archive and New Zealand Film Archive.	
1924	The Arab	Rex Ingram	Ramón Novarro, Alice Terry	Found in Russian state archives; Gosfilmofond (Moscow). Digital copy given to the Library of Congress in 2010.	
1924	The Breaking Point	Herbert Brenon	Nita Naldi, Patsy Ruth Miller, George Fawcett	Exists in the Library of Congress Film Archive.	
1924	The City Without Jews	Hans Karl Breslauer	Johannes Riemann, Eugen Neufeld, Hans Moser	Found by collector in Paris flea market, 2015. Restored by Filmarchiv Austria, via crowd-funding.	
1924	Dynamite Smith	Ralph Ince	Charles Ray, Jacqueline Logan, Bessie Love, Wallace Beery	An 8mm copy with Dutch intertitles from the collection of David Wyatt was found in 2023 and published on YouTube with English subtitles.	
1924	Empty Hearts	Alfred Santell	John Bowers, Clara Bow	Held by UCLA Film and Television Archive.	
1924	Our Pet	Herman C. Raymaker	Baby Peggy	A print was discovered after a Japanese auction in October 2016.	
1924	The Cat's Meow	Roy Del Ruth	Harry Langdon	An incomplete print was posted to youtube in 3 reels, in May 2025.	
1924	Peg o' the Mounted	Alfred J. Goulding	Baby Peggy	A print was discovered amongst the holdings of the Nederlands Filmmuseum.	
1924	Pied Piper Malone	Alfred E. Green	Thomas Meighan, Lois Wilson, Emma Dunn	Discovered in a Russian film archive by historians Mark Tiedje and John Coles. It was screened in 2007 in Georgetown, South Carolina, where it was filmed. Now stored in National Film Foundation of Russian Federation Archive.	
1924	Secrets of the Night	Herbert Blaché	James Kirkwood Sr., Madge Bellamy, ZaSu Pitts	Discovered in a basement in Mississauga, Ontario, in 2017.	
1924	Venus of the South Seas	James R. Sullivan	Annette Kellerman, Roland Purdu, Norman French	Restored by Library of Congress in 2004. Last reel of 55-minute film is in Prizmacolor. Held by New Zealand Film Archive and British Film Institute	
1925	Borrowed Finery	Oscar Apfel	Louise Lorraine, Ward Crane, Lou Tellegen	Found in a Czech film archive in late 2016.	
1925	The Clash of the Wolves	Noel M. Smith	Rin Tin Tin, Charles Farrell, June Marlowe, Heinie Conklin	A 35mm projection print was uncovered in South Africa and repatriated to the United States. It underwent restoration and preservation in 2003. Exists in: George Eastman House (Rochester, New York, United States); Library of Congress (Washington DC, United States); National Archives of Canada (Ottawa, Canada); Filmmuseum (Amsterdam, the Netherlands); UCLA Film and Television Archive (Los Angeles, California, United States)	
1925	The Dance of the Falling Flowers (落花の舞)	Unknown	Matsunosuke Onoe	A scene of the film that was edited out due to censorship was donated to the National Film Archive of Japan by a former deceased Interior Ministry official in 1988, but was not revealed until November 2022. No complete copy of this film has survived and only the scene that audiences could not see at the time of the release has survived.	
1925	Keep Smiling	Albert Austin, Gilbert Pratt	Monty Banks	Found in Russian state archives. Digital copy given to the Library of Congress in 2010.	
1925	The Last Edition	Emory Johnson	Ralph Lewis	Rediscovered at the Dutch EYE Film Institute.	
1925	Seven Sinners	Lewis Milestone	Clive Brook, Marie Prevost	A private collector obtained the film, Milestone's first feature, from a closed-down cinema in Melbourne. Warner Archive Collection and Turner Entertainment planned to restore the film for a 2017 DVD release and showing at the San Francisco Silent Film Festival.	
1925	Wood Love	Hans Neumann	Werner Krauss, Ruth Weyher, Theodor Becker (actor), Valeska Gert, Tamara Geva	Long considered a lost film, the North American version of the German film was discovered in Oregon in 2010, buried under a cellar floor and coated in machine oil. The UCLA Film & Television Archive and The Film Foundation restored the film from a 35mm nitrate silent tinted print. Set to be screened on April 6, 2024 at the Billy Wilder Theater.	
1926	Bardelys the Magnificent	King Vidor	John Gilbert	Restored in 2008 from a nearly-complete print discovered in France in 1998.	
1926	The Bat	Roland West	Tullio Carminati	Print exists at UCLA Film And Television Archive.	
1926	The Devil's Circus	Benjamin Christensen	Norma Shearer, Charles Emmett Mack	Thought to have been lost, a print of The Devil's Circus was found and has been preserved by George Eastman House.	
1926	Einigkeit und Recht und Freiheit (Unity and Law and Freedom)	Joseph Delmont	Paul Hartmann, Trude Hoffmann, Eugen Klöpfer, Carl de Vogt, Hermann Bachmann, Arthur Bergen, Marion Illing, Elga Brink, Clementine Plessner	It was based on the film "Die entfesselte Menschheit" from 1920 (Humanity Unleashed), using previously shot scenes, adding new scenes and some documentary material. This full 90 minutes film, was restored and digitized by the Bundesarchiv-Filmarchiv in Berlin.	
1926	His Busy Hour	J. P. McGowan	James Pierce	Thought lost until a print was discovered in the closet of a French asylum in the 1990s.	
1926	Irish Destiny	George Dewhurst	Paddy Dunne Cullinan	Thought lost until a nitrate print was discovered in the Library of Congress in 1991.	
1926	Ko-Ko's Queen	Dave Fleischer	Koko the Clown (animation)	Rediscovered in 2014 in the archive of EYE Filmmuseum in Amsterdam. It is an Out of the Inkwell cartoon, in which Koko the Clown designs his ideal woman.	
1926	The Little Irish Girl	Roy Del Ruth	Dolores Costello, John Harron, Matthew Betz	A print with some decomposition was discovered in the suburbs of Sydney, Australia in 2026. The film was then donated to National Film and Sound Archive for preservation efforts.	
1926	Mare Nostrum	Rex Ingram	Antonio Moreno, Alice Terry		
1926	A Page of Madness	Teinosuke Kinugasa	Masao Inoue, Yoshie Nakagawa	Found by the director in his garden shed in 1970; he had buried it during World War II and forgotten it, but a third of the original footage is still missing.	
1926	Silence	Rupert Julian	Vera Reynolds, H.B. Warner, Raymond Hatton	This film was long thought lost, but in 2016 La Cinémathèque Française found a copy of the film in their archives. A complete restoration was conducted with a planned debut at the San Francisco Silent Film Festival in June 2017. In November 2020 this film became available to watch online.	
1926	Taras Tryasilo	Pyotr Chardynin	Ambrose Buchma, Natalia Uzhvij, Ivan Zamychkovsky	The film has long been considered lost, however, in 1998, film critic Lyubomir Goseyko found a tape on a 16-mm film in the archives of French cinematics, where it was stored under the name "Tatars". With the efforts of the National Center of Oleksandr Dovzhenko, the film was brought to Ukraine and restored.	
1927	The Cave of the Silken Web	Dan Duyu	Yin Mingzhu	Thought lost until a copy surfaced in 2013 in the National Library of Norway in Mo i Rana.	
1927	A Diary of Chuji's Travels	Daisuke Itō	Denjirō Ōkōchi	Originally released in three parts, all of which were long thought to be lost until portions of the second part and much of the third part were discovered and restored in 1991.	
1927	Duck Soup	Fred Guiol	Laurel & Hardy	Thought lost until a copy surfaced in 1974.	
1927	Empty Socks	Walt Disney	Oswald the Lucky Rabbit	Cartoon film made by Disney recovered in Norway in 2014.	
1927	Eyes of the Totem	W. S. Van Dyke	Tom Santschi, Wanda Hawley	One of three silent films made by Tacoma, Washington based studio H.C. Weaver Productions. Thought lost until discovered in Van Dyke's archives at the Museum of Modern Art in 2014. Screened in Tacoma on September 18, 2015.	
1927	Garras de oro	P. P. Jambrina		The restoration of the extant footage was screened in New York City in 2008. The film has since been referred to as the first anti-imperialist film.	
1927	The Gorilla	Alfred Santell	Charles Murray, Fred Kelsey, Walter Pidgeon, Alice Day	The digital restoration debut at the San Francisco Silent Film Festival on April 14, 2024.	
1927	Ham and Eggs at the Front	Roy Del Ruth	Tom Wilson, Heinie Conklin, Myrna Loy	Long thought to be a lost film, a print was screened at the Pordenone Silent Film Festival in 2021 courtesy of the Cineteca Italiana.	
1927	Her Wild Oat	Marshall Neilan	Colleen Moore, Larry Kent, Hallam Cooley	Found by Hugh Neely in the Czech National Film Archive in Prague in 2001 and subsequently restored by the Academy Film Archive.	
1927	It	Clarence G. Badger	Clara Bow	Believed lost until a print surfaced in Prague in the 1960s.	
1927	Metropolis	Fritz Lang	Gustav Fröhlich, Brigitte Helm	Original long version was presumed to be lost for decades, while the shorter cuts still survived. In 2008, two different versions of the film were found: one by Museo del Cine from Buenos Aires, Argentina, and another in the National Film Archive of New Zealand. Both versions were then edited into one cut to get as near the original version as possible.	
1927	Mickey's Circus	Albert Herman	Mickey Rooney	Rediscovered in 2014 in the archive of EYE Filmmuseum in Amsterdam. This was Rooney's first starring role.	
1927	Mockery	Benjamin Christensen	Lon Chaney, Barbara Bedford, Ricardo Cortez	Thought to have been lost, it was rediscovered in the mid-1970s, it is available from George Eastman House and on DVD from Warner Bros.	
1927	Poor Papa	Walt Disney	Oswald The Lucky Rabbit	3 incomplete surviving copies were found in the United Kingdom around the 2000s, all of which were sold to private collectors. In 2015, Disney found a complete copy of the cartoon in a private collection. The short was later restored and included as a bonus feature on the 2017 "Signature Edition" Blu-ray release of Pinocchio.	
1927	Sorrell and Son	Herbert Brenon	H. B. Warner, Anna Q. Nilsson, Carmel Myers		
1927	Tarzan and the Golden Lion	J. P. McGowan	James Pierce	Thought lost until a print was discovered in the closet of a French asylum in the 1990s.	
1927	Taxi! Taxi!	Melville W. Brown	Edward Everett Horton, Marian Nixon, Burr McIntosh, Edward Martindel	Discovered in late 2024 as a "Show-At-Home" 16mm print and was screened at the Bruno Walter Auditorium in New York Public Library for the Performing Arts on January 11, 2025.	
1927	Two Arabian Knights	Lewis Milestone	William Boyd, Mary Astor, Louis Wolheim	Produced by Howard Hughes, and long thought lost until a print was found in his vault after his death.	
1927	Upstream	John Ford	Nancy Nash, Earle Foxe, Grant Withers	Discovered in New Zealand in 2010 among 75 silent films being returned to the US, many of which were thought lost.	
1927	Why Girls Love Sailors	Fred Guiol	Laurel & Hardy	Thought lost for many years, but then officially surfaced in 1985.	
1927	Wings	William A. Wellman	Clara Bow, Charles 'Buddy' Rogers, Richard Arlen, Gary Cooper	Found in the Cinémathèque Française film archive in Paris. Winner of the first Academy Award for Best Picture.	
1927	The Wreck of the Hesperus	Elmer Clifton	Alan Hale, Virginia Bradford, Frank Marion	Discovered at Cineteca Milano in 2025 and screened at Orinda Theatre on November 13, 2025 as a part of San Francisco Silent Film Festival.	
1928	The Cameraman	Edward Sedgwick, Buster Keaton	Buster Keaton, Marceline Day, Harold Goodwin	The last print was presumed destroyed in the 1965 MGM vault fire. A complete print was discovered in Paris in 1968. A second, incomplete (but better-quality) print surfaced in 1991.	
1928	The Cardboard Lover	Robert Z. Leonard	Marion Davies, Jetta Goudal, Nils Asther	A print bought by a private collector from a recycling centre. United Kingdom. (2015)	
1928	The Constant Nymph	Adrian Brunel	Ivor Novello, Benita Hume	The film was found as a result of a 1992 British Film Institute campaign to locate missing movies.	
1928	The Crimson City	Archie Mayo	Myrna Loy, Conrad Nagel, Anna May Wong	A complete print was discovered in Argentina in 2008.	
1928	Forbidden Hours	Harry Beaumont	Ramon Novarro, Renée Adorée	A complete print has survived, as well as a 16 mm reduction positive trailer.	
1928	Hungry Hobos	Walt Disney	Oswald the Lucky Rabbit, Peg-Leg Pete	Cartoon film made by Disney recovered in 2011 in the Huntley Film Archives.	
1928	Chūkon giretsu: Jitsuroku Chūshingura (実録忠臣蔵)	Shōzō Makino	Sentaro Nakamura, Shōzō Makino	Long thought to have been destroyed, a 66-minute print running four reels was discovered in September 2015. 130 minutes of this 1928 film are currently missing.	
1928	The Mating Call	James Cruze	Thomas Meighan, Evelyn Brent, Renée Adorée	Produced by Howard Hughes, and long thought lost until a print was found in his vault after his death.	
1928	My Son	Yevgeni Chervyakov	Gennadiy Michurin, Anna Sten, Pyotr Berezov	In 2008, five 16mm film reels of a film without the original titles, labeled as "El Hijo del otro" ("The son of another") were found in Argentina. Copies of the film were kept in the archive of the Museum of Cinema in Buenos Aires.	
1928	The Passion of Joan of Arc	Carl Theodor Dreyer	Maria Falconetti	The truncated reissue was thought all that remained, until a complete version was found in 1981 in the closet of a Norwegian mental institution.	
1928	A Race for Life	D. Ross Lederman	Rin Tin Tin	Originally, the film was presumed to be lost. However, according to the Library of Congress Database, the film was found in the Netherlands in 2016.	
1928	The Racket	Lewis Milestone	Thomas Meighan, Marie Prevost, Louis Wolheim	Produced by Howard Hughes, and discovered following his death in his private collection.	
1928	Ramona	Edwin Carewe	Dolores del Río	Recovered in Prague and screened in Los Angeles in March 2014	
1928	Sadie Thompson	Raoul Walsh	Gloria Swanson, Lionel Barrymore, Raoul Walsh	A print was found in Mary Pickford's personal archive after her death.	
1928	Sleigh Bells	Walt Disney, Ub Iwerks	Oswald the Lucky Rabbit	An Oswald the Lucky Rabbit cartoon film thought to be lost, but discovered in 2015.	
1928	The Spanking Age	Robert F. McGowan	Mary Ann Jackson, Bobby Hutchins, Jean Darling	An Our Gang film thought to be lost, but discovered in 1990.	
1928	Show Girl	Alfred Santell	Alice White, Donald Reed	In 2015, a print was discovered in an Italian film archive.	
1929	Careers	John Francis Dillon	Billie Dove, Antonio Moreno	A print of the silent version was discovered in the Cineteca Milano film archive. However, an all-talking version remains lost.	
1929	Scarlet Seas	John Francis Dillon	Richard Barthelmess, Betty Compson, Loretta Young		
1929	Synthetic Sin	William Seiter	Colleen Moore, Antonio Moreno	In the late 1990s, a 35mm print of the film was discovered to survive in an Italian archive.	
1929	Why Be Good?	William Seiter	Colleen Moore, Neil Hamilton, Bodil Rosing	In the late 1990s, a 35mm print of the film was discovered to survive in an Italian archive.	

=== 1930s ===
Year	Film	Director	Cast	Notes	Ref
1930	Wara Wara	José María Velasco Maidana	Juanita Taillansier, Martha de Velasco, Arturo Borda	The only known surviving Bolivian film of the silent era. Discovered in a La Paz basement in 1989, it required over a decade of restoration and was not released until 2010.	
1931	Love and Duty	Bu Wancang	Ruan Lingyu	Silent film made in China, and rediscovered in Uruguay in the 1990s.	
1938	As the Earth Turns	Richard Lyford		Discovered over 80 years later in Lyford's former home.	
1938	Too Much Johnson	Orson Welles	Orson Welles, Joseph Cotten, Mary Wickes, Arlene Francis, Ruth Ford	The film was thought lost in a 1971 fire at Welles' home in Spain; footage was found in Pordenone, Italy, and restored at George Eastman House for premiere in October 2013	

== Sound films ==
=== 1920s ===
Year	Film	Director	Cast	Notes	Ref
1929	Drag	Frank Lloyd	Richard Barthelmess, Lucien Littlefield, Kathrin Clare Ward		
1929	The Letter	Jean de Limur	Jeanne Eagels, Reginald Owen, Herbert Marshall, Irene Browne, O.P. Heggie, Lady Tsen Mei, Tamaki Yoshiwara	The film was rediscovered in June 2011, when a restored version was released on home video by Warner Bros. as part of its Warner Archive Collection.	

=== 1930s ===
Year	Film	Director	Cast	Notes	Ref
1930	Bed and Breakfast	Walter Forde	Jane Baxter; Richard Cooper; Sari Maritza; Alf Goddard	It was found as a result of a 1992 British Film Institute campaign to search for lost films.	
1930	Follow Thru	Lloyd Corrigan; Laurence Schwab	Charles 'Buddy' Rogers; Nancy Carroll; Zelma O'Neal; Jack Haley	Thought to be lost until a complete print was discovered in the 1990s. Restored and preserved by the UCLA Film and Television Archive.	
1930	Mamba	Albert S. Rogell	Jean Hersholt; Eleanor Boardman; Ralph Forbes	Footage from the final reel (stored at the UCLA Film and Television Archive) and all the Vitaphone soundtrack discs for this Technicolor film were originally thought to be the only elements from the film to survive. A complete print of the film, running nine reels, and four soundtrack discs were discovered in Australia in 2009.	
1931	Drácula	George Melford	Carlos Villarías, Lupita Tovar	This Spanish-language version was made at night, while Tod Browning's Dracula was filmed during the day, using the same sets. It was considered lost until a print was rediscovered in the 1970s.	
1931	Europa	Stefan Themerson, Franciszka Themerson	??	Based on Polish poet Anatol Stern’s 1925 futurist poem, this avant-garde film - with its strong anti-fascist agenda - was seized by the Nazi Party in 1940 and considered destroyed. However, it was rediscovered in 2019 in Berlin's Bundesarchiv, and was reshown for the first time as part of the 65th BFI London Film Festival.	
1931	The Smiling Lieutenant	Ernst Lubitsch	Maurice Chevalier, Claudette Colbert, Miriam Hopkins	Rediscovered in Denmark in the 1980s.	
1931	The Stolen Jools	William C. McGann	All-star cast	Made for a charity, film was discovered in the 1990s in the UK under its alternate title The Slippery Pearls. Another print was later found in the US under the alternative title.	
1931	Street Across	Vladimir Suteev, Lev Atamanov		Originally titled Pinwheel, also known as The Sleep of a Transport Official, this is a Soviet propaganda animated film from 1931. It was the animation debut of the famous director, children's writer and illustrator Vladimir Suteev and was the first Soviet original sound cartoon. The cartoon was thought to be lost until found in the Czech film archives. The cartoon was first shown in 2013 at the Russian Gosfilmofond festival "Beliye Stolby" (White Pillars) and is now available on YouTube.	
1932	Condemned to Death	Walter Forde	Arthur Wontner; Gillian Lind; Gordon Harker; Cyril Raymond	It was found as a result of a 1992 British Film Institute campaign to search for lost films.	
1932	His Lordship	Michael Powell	Jerry Verno; Janet McGrew	Declared to be "Missing, Believed Lost" by the British Film Institute, but a copy was subsequently found.	
1932	The Old Dark House	James Whale	Boris Karloff; Melvyn Douglas; Gloria Stuart	Thought lost for decades; filmmaker Curtis Harrington discovered a print in the Universal Studios vault, which was restored by Eastman House.	
1932	Rynox	Michael Powell	Stuart Rome, John Longden	Found in the vaults of Pinewood Studios in 1990 and was subsequently transferred and restored by the BFI National Archive.	
1933	Berkeley Square	Frank Lloyd	Leslie Howard, Heather Angel, Valerie Taylor	Rediscovered in the 1970s.	
1933	Blood Money	Rowland Brown	George Bancroft, Judith Anderson, Frances Dee	It was considered a lost film for nearly 40 years before resurfacing.	
1933	Deluge	Felix E. Feist	Sidney Blackmer	For many years, Deluge was thought to be a lost film, but a print dubbed in Italian was found in a film archive in Italy in the late 1980s. Before the discovery, the only part of the film known to have survived was the impressive footage of the tidal wave destroying New York City, which was used in the Republic Pictures serials Dick Tracy vs. Crime, Inc. (1941) and King of the Rocket Men (1949).	
1933	The Ghoul	T. Hayes Hunter	Boris Karloff, Ernest Thesiger	A damaged and incomplete copy was found in Czechoslovakia in the 1970s, but a nearly-pristine print was located in the archives of the British Film Institute.	
1933	Hello Pop!	Jack Cummings	Ted Healy, The Three Stooges	A full Technicolor print was found in Sydney, Australia, in January 2013.	
1933	It's Great to Be Alive	Alfred L. Werker	Raul Roulien, Gloria Stuart, Edna May Oliver	Unavailable for several decades after its release, this film was officially considered lost. The Museum of Modern Art in New York premiered a restored version in 2017.	
1933	Laughter in Hell	Edward L. Cahn	Pat O'Brien, Gloria Stuart, Merna Kennedy	Long thought to be lost, a print of this chain gang drama was found in mid-2012 and was screened by the American Cinematheque in Hollywood in October of that year.	
1933	Ojo Okichi (Miss Okichi)	Kenji Mizoguchi	Isuzu Yamada	This film did not actually appear in official filmographies of Mizoguchi until a print was discovered in the vaults of Shochiku studios in 2008.	
1933	Der Sieg des Glaubens	Leni Riefenstahl	Adolf Hitler	This 64-minute documentary was ordered to be destroyed by Adolf Hitler for showing Nazi party member Ernst Röhm, who had been murdered on Hitler's orders. A copy was found in East German archives in the 1980s.	
1933	This Week of Grace	Maurice Elvey	Gracie Fields, Henry Kendall, John Stuart	The comedy turned up as a result of the British Film Institute's 2010 drive to find missing films.	
1934	Crossroads of Youth (청춘의 십자로)	Ahn Jong-hwa		Found in 2007.	
1934	Hitler's Reign of Terror	Michael Mindlin		Found in Belgian customs in 2013.	
1934	Of Human Bondage	John Cromwell	Leslie Howard, Bette Davis	The negative was discovered to have been destroyed in 1964 when actress Kim Novak requested a print. A copy was recovered several years later.	
1934	Murzilka in Africa	Yevheniy Horbach, Semen Huietskyi		Soviet propaganda animated film made in the Ukrainian factory "Ukrainfilm" in Kiev. The film was considered lost until August 6, 2018. It is now available on YouTube.	
1935	Charlie Chan in Paris	Lewis Seiler	Warner Oland		
1935	Kliou the Tiger	Henry de La Falaise		The first feature film shot in Indochina and the last commercially released American silent film. It was also the last American feature film to use the 2-color Technicolor process. A black and white print was recovered from the collection of Jerry Haber in the early 2000s.	
1935	Oidhche Sheanchais	Robert J. Flaherty	Maggie Dirrane, Colman 'Tiger' King, Michael Dirrane, Patch 'Red Beard' Ruadh	A recording of traditional Irish storytelling, and the earliest Irish language sync sound film. A fire was believed to have destroyed all copies in 1943, but a nitrate print was discovered in 2012 in Harvard University's Houghton Library. A restored 35mm version premiered in 2015.	
1935	Princess Kaguya	Yoshitsugu Tanaka	Ichirō Fujiyama, Kazuko Kitazawa, Hyō Kitazawa, Hideko Higashi	Musical film recovered by the British Film Institute in May 2015.	
1935	She	Lansing C. Holden, Irving Pichel	Helen Gahagan, Randolph Scott, Helen Mack	An original print was discovered in Buster Keaton's garage.	
1935	Tag der Freiheit: Unsere Wehrmacht	Leni Riefenstahl	Adolf Hitler, Hermann Göring, Rudolf Hess, Heinrich Himmler	Thought to have been lost following World War II, an incomplete print running 28 minutes was discovered in the 1970s.	
1935	Yowamushi Chinsengumi	Kon Ichikawa		Cartoon film recovered in the United States in 2014.	
1936	The Flying Doctor	Miles Mander	Charles Farrell, Mary Maguire	The first eight of nine reels were saved by an Australian office worker who noticed a truck loaded with film cans driving past his window on its way to dispose of them. He gave chase in his car and rescued the film, which included the incomplete print of The Flying Doctor. Two years later, the shortened British version was discovered. Despite this print having been "totally rearranged," its eighth and last reel was found to take up exactly where the Australian one left off.	
1936	The Arrogant Chicken	Ippolit Lazarchuk		The Arrogant Chicken (Ukrainian: Чванливе курча) is a Ukrainian two-color animated film directed by Ippolit Lazarchuk, produced in 1936 at the Ukrainfilm studio. The film was considered lost when it was discovered in 2024.	
1936	Diwata ng Karagatan	Carlos Vander Tolosa	Mari Velez, Rogelio de la Rosa	Oldest surviving Filipino film. All films made in Manila were destroyed during World War II in 1941 and it is among thought lost until a edited down French-dubbed copy were tracked down in Cinémathèque royale de Belgique film archive in Belgium in 2025.	
1937	Summer Rain	Mario Monicelli		The first film to be directed by the then 21-year-old Italian director Mario Monicelli, with the pseudonym of Michele Badiek. Never published for theatrical release, it was thought to be a lost film until 2011, when some fragments were discovered in the editor's personal archive.	
1937	Zamboanga	Eduardo de Castro	Fernando Poe, Rosa del Rosario	This film, produced in the Philippines, was thought to have been lost until Nick Deocampo found an original copy in the United States Library of Congress.	
1938	Buzzy Boop at the Concert	Dave Fleischer	Mae Questel	A cartoon starring Buzzy Boop, the cousin of Betty Boop. Rediscovered in Russia in 2019 and restored by the UCLA Film and Television Archive.	
1939	L'espoir	André Malraux	Andrés Mejuto, Nicolás Rodríguez, José Sempere, Julio Peña	It was finished in July 1939 and shown twice in Paris, but Francoist regime applied pressure to censor it. All known copies were believed destroyed in World War II, until one was found and the film was reissued in 1945. In Spain, it was not screened until 1977.	
1939	Le jour se lève	Marcel Carné	Jean Gabin, Jules Berry, Arletty	When RKO acquired the distribution rights to Le Jour se lève in preparation for remaking it as The Long Night, they also sought to buy up and destroy all available prints of the original film. For a time, it was thought that the French film had been lost completely, but copies reappeared in the 1950s.	
1939	Smith	Michael Powell	Ralph Richardson, Flora Robson	A short film made to promote an ex-servicemen's charity. It was shelved because of the start of World War II and was not shown publicly, nor was it even mentioned by Powell in his autobiography. A copy was found in 2003 and it had its first public screening in the UK in 2004, 65 years after it was completed.	
1939	Tevya	Maurice Schwartz	Maurice Schwartz; Julius Adler	Long thought lost, a print was discovered and restored in 1978.	

=== 1940s ===
Year	Film	Director	Cast	Notes	Ref
1940	Confucius	Fei Mu	Tang Huaiqiu, Zhang Yi, Sima Yingcai	A print was anonymously donated to the Hong Kong Film Archive in 2001.	
1940	Kampf um Norwegen – Feldzug 1940	Martin Rikli; Werner Buhre	No cast listed	Considered a lost film for many years. The Berlin Bundesarchiv held only a few clips of the film. However, a complete nitrate copy surfaced on an Internet auction in 2005. The Norwegian college professor and media expert Jostein Saakvitne discovered this and purchased the copy.	
1940	Swiss Family Robinson	Edward Ludwig	Thomas Mitchell, Edna Best	Walt Disney bought the rights to the film, because he did not want people comparing it with his 1960 version. It was believed that Disney destroyed all copies until it was released briefly from their Vault DVD Collection in 2010, sold by Turner Classic Movies only.	.
1941	Kukan	Rey Scott	No cast listed	An extant print of this Academy Award-winning documentary was located by Hawaiian filmmaker Robin Lung.	
1941	This Man Is Dangerous	Lawrence Huntington	James Mason, Gordon McLeod, Mary Clare	Shown on British television as late as 1987 before being lost. Formerly on the BFI 75 Most Wanted list, a copy was discovered in 2017 with title cards for its US title, The Patient Vanishes.	
1943	Deadlock	Ronald Haines	John Slater	Its appearance on the BFI 75 Most Wanted list led to it being found.	
1943	Safo, historia de una pasión	Carlos Hugo Christensen	Mecha Ortiz, Roberto Escalada, Mirtha Legrand		
1944	Melusine	Hans Steinhoff	Olga Chekhova, Siegfried Breuer	Believed to be lost until the late 1990s, the film had its premiere on March 2, 2014, in Berlin.	
1944	Welcome, Mr. Washington	Leslie S. Hiscott	Barbara Mullen, Donald Stewart, Peggy Cummins	A wartime drama, Welcome, Mr. Washington was listed as one of the British Film Institute's "75 Most Wanted" lost films for some years. In early 2016, a complete print had been discovered in a locker in London's Cinema Museum, giving Cummins the opportunity to see the film on her 90th birthday. It was screened at BFI Southbank in late January 2016.	
1945	For You Alone	Geoffrey Faithfull	Lesley Brook, Dinah Sheridan, Jimmy Hanley	Another film on the BFI 75 Most Wanted list. On July 31, 2019, a 16mm safety print was uncovered by Ray Langstone at the UCLA Film and Television Archive using their online searchable database, being held as part of the Mel Torme Collection.	
1945	Momotaro: Sacred Sailors	Mitsuyo Seo	No cast listed	Japan's first feature animated film. Presumed to have been confiscated and burnt by the American occupation, but a negative was found in Shochiku's vault in 1984.	
1946	Spree for All	Seymour Kneitel		A Famous Studios' Noveltoon featuring Snuffy Smith. Most prints, including the original negatives, were destroyed by request of King Features Syndicate (owners of the character), but a 16mm print of the film in black and white with French subtitles was found on eBay and uploaded to YouTube in 2016. An English print, also in 16mm, was discovered in the same year at the BFI archives and uploaded to YouTube in 2022.	
1949	Aux quatre coins	Jacques Rivette	Francis Bouchet	Rivette's first short film, long believed to be lost until Rivette's widow found a copy in their apartment shortly after Rivette's death in 2016.	
1949	The Queen of Spades	Thorold Dickinson	Anton Walbrook, Edith Evans, Yvonne Mitchell	The rediscovered film was re-released in British cinemas on 26 December 2009.	

=== 1950s ===
Year	Film	Director	Cast	Notes	Ref
1950	Double Confession	Ken Annakin	Derek Farr	After being listed on the BFI 75 Most Wanted, the film was available on DVD for a short time. The only known 35mm print is in a private archive in the UK.	
1950	Guilty Bystander	Joseph Lerner	Zachary Scott as Max Thursday, Faye Emerson as Georgia.	Based on the novel of the same name by Wade Miller (New York, 1947).	
1950	Le quadrille	Jacques Rivette	Jean-Luc Godard, Anne-Marie Cazalis	Rivette's second short film, long believed to be lost until Rivette's widow found a copy in their apartment shortly after Rivette's death in 2016.	
1952	Le divertissement	Jacques Rivette	Sacha Briquet, Olga Waren	Rivette's third short film, long believed to be lost until Rivette's widow found a copy in their apartment shortly after Rivette's death in 2016.	
1952	Hammer the Toff	Maclean Rogers	John Bentley, Patricia Dainton, Valentine Dyall	On the BFI 75 Most Wanted list. A DVD was released by Renown Films in March 2016, coupled with the earlier Mrs Prym of Scotland Yard.	
1952	Salute the Toff	Maclean Rogers	John Bentley, Carol Marsh, Valentine Dyall	Sequel to Hammer the Toff and also one of the BFI 75 Most Wanted. Released by Renown Films in 2013.	
1953	Small Town Story	Montgomery Tully	Donald Houston, Susan Shaw, Alan Wheatley, Kent Walton	Another of the BFI 75 Most Wanted. It has been found and released by Network Distributing on DVD.	
1953	The Tell-Tale Heart	J. B. Williams	Stanley Baker	20-minute British adaptation of Edgar Allan Poe's psychological drama, rediscovered in 2017 when Jeff Wells, a 16mm enthusiast, found the reel in his loft in Drummore, near Stranraer. It is now digitally restored and is available to watch online.	
1954	Akuma ga Kitari te Fue o Fuku	Sadatsugu Matsuda	Chiezō Kataoka, Mitsuko Miura	One of six adaptations of the Kosuke Kindaichi series starring Kataoka. The movie, as well as two other movies of the adaptations which are still missing, was considered lost until in 2024 when NHK reported that Naotaka Yamaguchi of Nishogakusha University found the film.	
1955	The Noble Experiment	Tom Graeff	Tom Graeff	Surviving print found by Elle Schneider in Los Angeles, now in UCLA Film and Television Archives.	
1956	A Girl in the Jungle	Mikhail Tsekhanovsky	Vladimir Volodin, Erast Garin, Vera Bendina	Soviet animated-drawn film based on the Indian folk tale The Tiger, the Brahmin and the Jackal. It was extensively searched for in 2000s and 2010s and was officially declared lost in the Soviet TV and Radio archive Gosteleradiofond. A copy was found in Yugoslav Film Archive in 2014, but that copy was never released to the viewers. In 2018 a vintage VCR enthusiast purchased an old Soviet video tape recorder and discovered an old damaged tape. On that tape the missing cartoon was identified, digitized, and uploaded to YouTube with a request for the public to help with the restoration. With the extensive efforts and help of the online community, the cartoon was restored. The restored version is now also available on YouTube.	
1957	Final Curtain	Ed Wood	Duke Moore, Dudley Manlove	Found and restored in 2011, premiered in 2012 at the Slamdance Film Festival.	
1957	Second Fiddle	Maurice Elvey	Adrienne Corri, Thorley Walters, Lisa Gastoni	Another member of the BFI 75 Most Wanted that is now available on DVD.	
1957	Turang	Bachtiar Siagian	Nizmah Zaglulsyah, Omar Bach, Ahmadi Hamid, Hadisjam Tahax, Tuahta Perangin-angin, Zubier Lelo	Believed to be lost, Turang was found in late 2023 in the Gosfilmofond archive. This Indonesian film was screened at the International Film Festival Rotterdam in February 2025.	
1958	Portrait of Gina	Orson Welles	Gina Lollobrigida	The short documentary was filmed in 1958, but was not aired on television at that time. Welles left the only print in a hotel room, and it ended up first in the lost-and-found department, then in a storage facility. It was rediscovered in 1986. After Lollobrigida saw it when it finally premiered, she took steps to have the short documentary banned.	
1959	Catch Me If You Can	Don Weis	Gilbert Roland, Dina Merrill, Greta Thyssen	The film was reported as finished but went unreleased due to being seized by the new government established after the Cuban Revolution ended and it was thought destroyed until an only known 35mm print was discovered in Portland, Oregon in April 2026 and screened by the Hollywood Theatre.	
1959	Shadows	John Cassavetes	Ben Carruthers, Lelia Goldoni	Cassavetes showed a first version of his film only a handful of times, then scrapped it and re-shot the movie entirely. The first version was found in 2004 at a sale of items lost on the New York City Subway, and tracked down by cinema historian Ray Carney.	

=== 1960s ===
Year	Film	Director	Cast	Notes	Ref
1960	Private Property	Leslie Stevens	Corey Allen	Crime drama set in Los Angeles, also starring Warren Oates and Kate Manx. Condemned by the National Legion of Decency, it was re-released in 2016 to critical acclaim.	
1960	Linda	Don Sharp	Carol White, Alan Rothwell	On the BFI 75 Most Wanted list of lost films, it has now been found and is due to be shown on Talking Pictures TV in August 2025.	
1961	Chasing Two Hares	Viktor Ivanov	Oleg Borisov, Marharyta Krynytsyna	Comedy film based on the eponymous play by Mykhailo Starytsky. The original Ukrainian-language version was rediscovered in 2013.	
1962	Big and Little Wong Tin Bar	Lung To	Jackie Chan	Chan's film debut. Thought to have been lost until a copy was uploaded to YouTube on February 3, 2016, most likely recorded off of TVB's Classic Movies channel.	
1962	Crosstrap	Robert Hartford-Davis	Laurence Payne	British B-movie thriller much criticized at the time for its violence. The film vanished without trace for decades until a negative print was found in a film lab in the early 2010s.	
1962	On the Harmfulness of Tobacco	Paul Newman	Michael Strong	25-minute short, based on a Anton Chekhov play of the same name, filmed entirely at a Yiddish theater on the Lower East Side. Newman could not find distribution and had his name taken off the film. Rediscovered in the 2000s, shown at Lincoln Center in 2017.	
1962	Pages of Death	Charles Keating	Tom Harmon	Anti-pornography short produced by Charles Keating. A faded 16mm print was discovered in the Moving Image collection at the Oregon Historical Society in late 2015. When lost, the film was ranked No. 14 in Gambit Magazine's list of 15 Films Lost to Time.	
1964	Batman Dracula	Andy Warhol	Jack Smith	Avant-garde film featuring Batman and Dracula. Thought to be lost for years until footage appeared in Jack Smith and the Destruction of Atlantis in 2006.	
1964	Richard Burton's Hamlet	Bill Colleran	Richard Burton	By contractual agreement, all prints of the film were to have been destroyed after its theatrical run. However, a single print was discovered in Burton's garage following his death.	
1965	Penis	A. J. Rose Jr.		A silent black and white film. Surviving print found at The Film-Makers' Cooperative in 2021, with a digitized version published on the Internet Archive.	
1966	Incubus	Leslie Stevens	William Shatner	Surviving print found at Cinémathèque Française with French subtitles.	
1966	The Naked Fog	Joe Sarno	Tammy Latour; Gretchen Rudolph	Exploitation film thought lost or destroyed for many years until found for sale as part of an eBay film lot. Restored by Film Movement for DVD & Blu-ray.	
1967	Sailor and the Devil	Richard Williams; Errol Le Cain	Professor Alex Bradford (singing voice)	An animated short film, thought lost in the fire at Williams' Soho studio until it was discovered in 2021. The original negatives were donated to the British Film Institute in hopes of restoring the film.	
1967	The Story of Hong Gil-dong	Shin Dong-hun		South Korea's first animated feature (traditional animation). It was believed that none of the prints of the film had survived to the present time, but in 2008, a 16mm print was found in Japan.	

=== 1970s ===
Year	Film	Director	Cast	Notes	Ref
1970	1985	Joe Nagy	Mark Evans Austad; George Putnam; Bill Jorgensen; Maury Povich	Environmentally-themed mockumentary produced by Metromedia Producers Corporation depicting a hypothetical near-future ecological crisis, presented as a simulated newscast with real-life Metromedia news personnel playing themselves. Although heavily promoted, the film only aired twice before seemingly disappearing without a trace. The University of California, Berkeley eventually obtained a copy in two parts and added it to their digital archives.	
1970	Heartbeat in the Brain	Joey Mellen	Amanda Feilding	Trepanation film with Feilding drilling a hole in her own head. Was due to be screened by Feilding at the ICA in April 2011; however, she did not in the end take part in the event.	
1970	Sex Power	Henry Chapier	Alain Noury; Jane Birkin; Juliette Villard	After a brief, limited theatrical release, the film was placed in storage and was presumed lost. The film was rediscovered and subsequently remastered for DVD release in 2010. Notable in part for its soundtrack by acclaimed composer Vangelis.	
1971	Bun-rye's Story	Yu Hyun-mok	Yoon Jeong-hee; Lee Soon-jae; Heo Jang-kang	Although once thought to be lost, a print was recovered overseas and restored by the Korean Film Council, which screened the film at their theater in northern Seoul on May 18, 2009.	
1971	Necromania	Edward D. Wood, Jr.	Maria Arnold; Rene Bond	Believed lost for years until an edited version resurfaced at a yard sale in 1992, followed by a complete, unedited print in 2001.	
1971	Wake in Fright	Ted Kotcheff	Gary Bond; Donald Pleasence; Chips Rafferty	For many years, Wake in Fright enjoyed a reputation as Australia's great "lost film." The film's editor, Anthony Buckley, found the negatives for it in a shipping container labelled "For Destruction," in Pittsburgh, PA, USA.	
1971	The Young Marrieds	Edward D. Wood, Jr.	Louis Wolf; Patti Kramer	Believed lost for years until rediscovered in Canada in 2004.	
1972	An American Hippie in Israel	Amos Sefer	Asher Tzarfati; Lily Avidan; Shmuel Wolf	Once thought lost, it was rediscovered decades later.	
1972	Marjoe	Howard Smith, Sarah Kernochan	Marjoe Gortner	Winner of the 1972 Academy Award for Best Documentary Feature, the film was long unavailable and the original stock had deteriorated past the point of recovery. In 2002, the original negatives and related materials were rediscovered and restored.	
1973	Amore	Henry Chapier	Daniel Quenaud; Sonia Petrovna; Julian Negulesco	After a brief, limited theatrical release, the film was placed in storage and was presumed lost. The film was rediscovered and subsequently remastered for online release in 2012. As with Chapier's earlier Sex Power, it's partially notable for its soundtrack by Vangelis.	
1974	Deranged	Jeff Gillen; Alan Ormsby	Roberts Blossom	Disappeared after its release in 1974 and was later rediscovered in Florida in the mid-1990s.	
1974	Leonard Cohen: Bird on a Wire	Tony Palmer	Leonard Cohen	Vanished after being edited at Cohen's insistence; discovered in 2009, released on DVD in 2010 and in theaters in 2017.	
1975	The Intruder	Chris Robinson	Mickey Rooney; Ted Cassidy; Yvonne De Carlo	Shelved by the distribution company, with the original negatives destroyed. It was considered lost until a print was discovered in storage in 2012. A Blu-ray was released by Garagehouse Pictures on August 1, 2017.	
1975	The Amusement Park	George A. Romero	Lincoln Maazel	After being shown at a Romero retrospective in 2001, the only known copy went missing until it was rediscovered in 2017.	
1976	Chess of the Wind	Mohammad Reza Aslani	Fakhri Khorvash, Mohammad-Ali Keshavarz, Akbar Zanjanpour, Shohreh Aghdashloo	Only screened once before the 1979 Revolution in Iran and then thought to be lost after being banned. It was rediscovered in 2014 by accident and restored over the next six years. After being re-screened in 2020, it was released on DVD and Blu-ray in 2022 by The Criterion Collection, as part of a Martin Scorsese's World Cinema Project box set.	
1976	Big Banana Feet	Murray Grigor and David Peat	Billy Connolly	Documentary about Connolly's 1975 tour of Ireland at the height of The Troubles. Lost for decades until a single copy was found at the Pacific Film Archive and restored.	
1978	Showdown at the Cotton Mill	Chi Ping Chang; Peng Chang; San Lin Chen	Wu Ma	Discovered in a Taiwanese film vault by Rarescope.	
1978	Tadhana	Nonoy Marcelo	Pandy Aviado; Estrella Kuenzler	Known as the first-ever Filipino animated feature film, the 35mm print was destroyed during the Marcos regime. Surviving copies were discovered by Mowelfund Film Institute and Pandy Aviado in 2018.	

=== 1980s ===
Year	Film	Director	Cast	Notes	Ref
1980	Black Angel	Roger Christian	Tony Vogel	Rediscovered in December 2011 by an archivist at Universal Studios.	
1985	Santo Gold's Blood Circus	Santo Rigatuso	Santo Gold	Rediscovered in 2008, its release has been sought by the producers.	

=== 1990s ===
Year	Film	Director	Cast	Notes	Ref
1990	Werewolf Hour	Igor Shevchenko	Mikhail Pakhomenko, Alexander Baluev	The film was shown once on the night air of the Tonis TV channel in 1990. The Werewolf Hour was considered lost for 31 years until interested activists of the lost media community began searching for it in early 2021. After the collapse of the Soviet Union, all rights to the TV movie were completely transferred to the Ukrainian TV channel Tonis, which ceased to exist in 2017. Gosteleradiofond, the National Library of Ukraine, the Alexander Dovzhenko National Center and the Odesa Film Studio gave a negative answer to the question of whether they have such a film in their archives. Finally, The Werewolf Hour was found in the archives of the Gosfilmofond. After the copyright issue was resolved, the film was published on April 28, 2021, on the YouTube channel "Odesa Alternative" - the creative studio of Igor Shevchenko".	
1991	Khraniteli	Natalya Serebryakova	Victor Kostetskiy, Elena Solovey	The miniseries was broadcast once in 1991 by Leningrad Television and then thought lost, only to be rediscovered 30 years later. It includes scenes of Tom Bombadil and Goldberry that were omitted from Peter Jackson's Lord of the Rings film trilogy.	
1993	Antifaust	Georg Friesen	Victor Avilov, Nikolay Lebedev, Vadim Ghems, Olga Danilova	The film was considered lost for a long time, until on July 13, 2021, people from the VKontakte community "From Outer Space" digitized a VHS copy of the film, which was kept by one of the cinematographers Dmitry Ermakov.	

=== 2000s ===
Year	Film	Director	Cast	Notes	Ref
2000	Monarch	John Walsh	T. P. McKenna, Jean Marsh, James Coombes, Peter Miles	After its initial premiere at the Mill Valley Film Festival, the original negative was rediscovered in 2014, and the film was subsequently re-released.	

== See also ==
- Bezhin Meadow, directed by Sergei Eisenstein: The production was halted in 1937 by the Soviet government and it was believed lost in World War II, but excerpts and partial prints were found and used to make a 35-minute slide show.
- The Dawson Film Find was the 1978 accidental discovery of 372 film titles preserved in 533 reels of silent-era nitrate films in the Klondike Gold Rush town of Dawson City.
- List of lost films
- List of incomplete or partially lost films
- List of films cut over the director's opposition
