= Bird on a Wire =

Bird on a Wire may refer to:

== Film ==
- Bird on a Wire (film), 1990 film starring Mel Gibson and Goldie Hawn
- Leonard Cohen: Bird on a Wire, is a 1974 documentary, directed by Tony Palmer

== Music ==
- Bird on a Wire (Tim Hardin album), a 1971 album
- Bird on a Wire (Toby Lightman album), a 2006 album
- "Bird on the Wire", a song by Leonard Cohen, covered by various artists as "Bird on a Wire"
