= Camping Out (film) =

1919 film

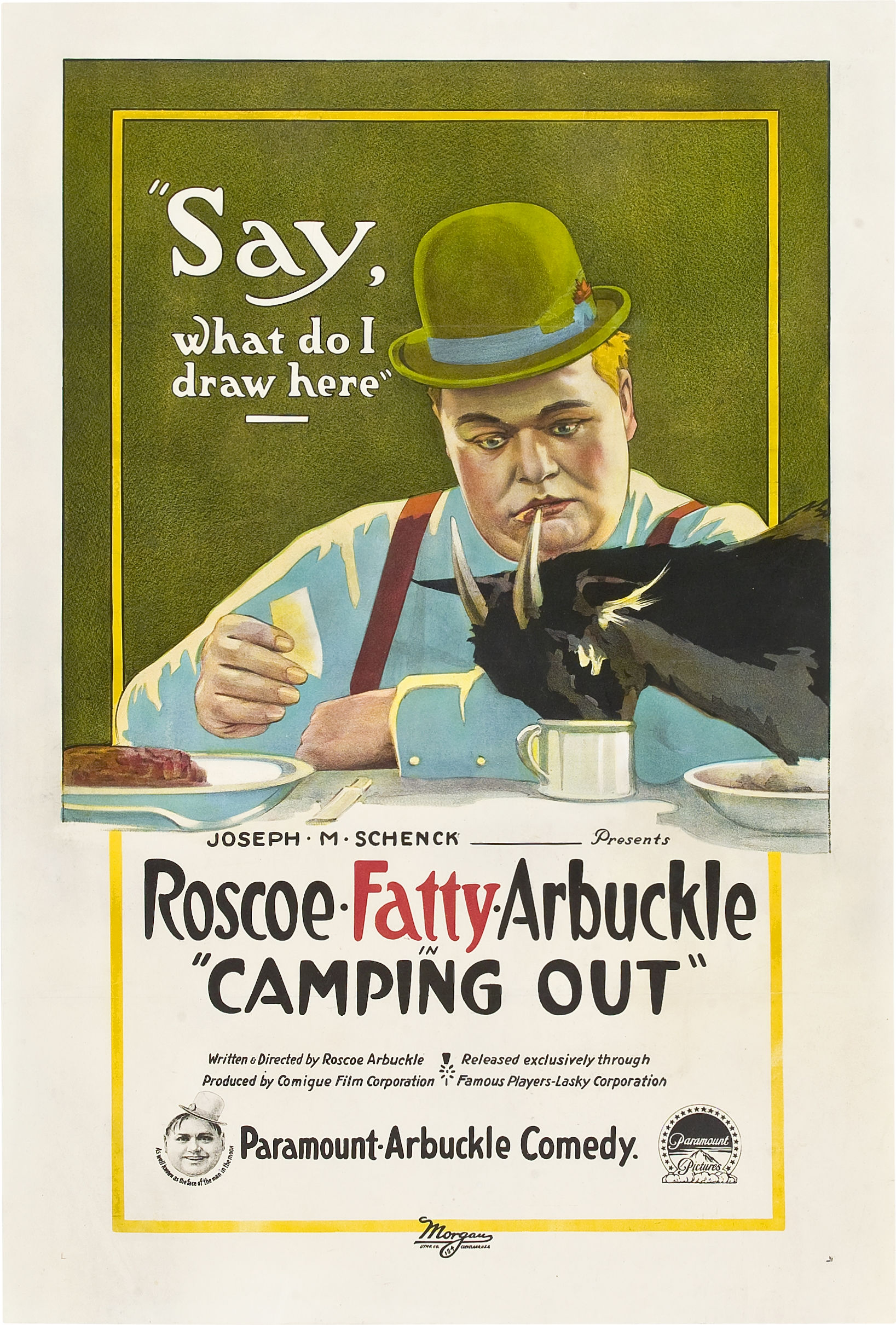
- Film poster
- Directed by: Fatty Arbuckle
- Written by: Fatty Arbuckle
- Starring: Fatty Arbuckle
- Release date: January 5, 1919
- Country: United States
- Language: Silent (English intertitles)

Camping Out is a 1919 American short comedy film directed by and starring Fatty Arbuckle. The two-reel film was considered lost until recently. Most of the film has been reconstructed from reels found in the Nederlands Filmmuseum and Cineteca Nazionale storage vaults in Rome in 2002.

== Plot ==
A man runs away from his wife's bad cooking, camps out on Santa Catalina Island, and attempts to do his own cooking.

== Cast ==
- Roscoe "Fatty" Arbuckle
- Al St. John
- Alice Lake
- Monty Banks

== See also ==
- List of American films of 1919
- List of rediscovered films
