= 2011 British Academy Scotland Awards =

- Date: 13 November 2011
- Site: Radisson Blu Hotel, Glasgow, Scotland
- Hosted by: Kevin Bridges

The 2011 British Academy Scotland Awards were held on 13 November 2011 at the Radisson Blu Hotel in Glasgow, honouring the best Scottish film and television productions of 2011. Presented by BAFTA Scotland, accolades are handed out for the best in feature-length film that were screened at British cinemas during 2011. The ceremony returned after a one-year absence. The Nominees were announced on 17 October 2011. The ceremony was broadcast online via YouTube and was hosted by Kevin Bridges.

Robbie Coltrane, David Peat, and Eileen Gallagher were honoured with Outstanding Contribution awards at this ceremony.

== Winners and nominees ==
Winners are listed first and highlighted in boldface.

Best Feature Film	Best Director
**Donkeys**: Neds; Perfect Sense	**Peter Mullan – Neds**: David Mackenzie – Perfect Sense; Morag McKinnon – Donkeys
Best Actor/Actress in Film	Best Actor/Actress in Television
**James Cosmo** – **Donkeys**: Conor McCarron – Neds as John McGill; Brian Pettifer – **Donkeys**	**Jayd Johnson** – **The Field of Blood** as Paddy Meehan: Peter Capaldi – The Field of Blood as Dr. Pete; Ford Kiernan – The Field of Blood as George McVie
Best Writer Film/Television	Best Entertainment Programme
**Peter Mullan – Neds**: David Kane – The Field of Blood; Colin McLaren – Donkeys	**Limmy's Show – (BBC Scotland), (The Comedy Unit)**: Burnistoun – (BBC Scotland), (The Comedy Unit); Rab C Nesbitt – (BBC Scotland), (The Comedy Unit)
Best Factual Series	Best Live Event Coverage
**The Scheme** – **(BBC Scotland)**: The Football Years: 1974 The Golden Generation – (STV); Neil Morrissey: Care Home Kid – (BBC Scotland)	**The Great Climb** – **(BBC Two)**: BBC Scotland: Release of Abdul Baset-Al Megrahi – (BBC Scotland); Royal Edinburgh Military Tattoo – (BBC Scotland)
Best Single Documentary	Best Television Drama
**Terry Pratchett: Choosing to Die** – **(BBC Two)**: The First Movie – (More4); Jig – (BBC Scotland)	**Case Histories** – (BBC Scotland): Garrow's Law – (BBC Scotland); Hattie – (BBC Scotland)
Best Current Affairs	Best Children's Programme
**The Walking Wounded** – **(BBC Scotland)**: BBC Scotland Investigates: Surgery's Dirty Secret – (BBC One); The Lockerbie Bomber: Sent Home to Die – (STV)	**Big City Park** – (BBC Scotland): All Over The Place – (BBC Scotland); Calum Dongle – (BBC Alba)
Best Game	Best Short Film
**Quarrel** – **Denki**: iBomber Defense – Cobra Mobile; Me Monstar: Hear Me Roar! – Cohort Studios	**I Love Luci** – **Colin Kennedy**: The Shutdown – Adam Stafford; Soltice – David Stoddart
Best Animation
**Fixing Luka** – **Jessica Ashman**: Battenberg – Stewart Comrie; The Tannery – Iain Gardner

=== Outstanding Contribution to Film ===
- **Robbie Coltrane**

=== Outstanding Contribution to Craft (In Memory of Robert McCann) ===
- **David Peat**

=== Outstanding Contribution to Broadcasting ===
- Eileen Gallagher

=== BAFTA Scotland Cineworld Audience Award ===
- Fast Romance

== See also ==
- BAFTA Scotland
- 64th British Academy Film Awards
- 83rd Academy Awards
- 17th Screen Actors Guild Awards
- 31st Golden Raspberry Awards
