= Marcus Nash =

Marcus Nash may refer to:

- Marcus Nash (American football) (born 1976), American football wide receiver
- Marcus Nash (actor) (born 1994), Scottish actor
- Marcus Nash (skier) (born 1971), American Olympic skier
