= Neds (film) =

2010 film directed by Peter Mullan

- Film poster
- Directed by: Peter Mullan
- Written by: Peter Mullan
- Produced by: Alain de la Mata, Lucinda Van Rie (UK), Conchita Airoldi (ITL), Fidelite (Fr)
- Starring: Conor McCarron; Martin Bell; Grant Wray; Marcus Nash; Linda Cuthbert; John Joe Hay; Sean Higgins; Steven Robertson; Peter Mullan
- Cinematography: Roman Osin
- Edited by: Colin Monie
- Music by: Craig Armstrong
- Production companies: Film4; Scottish Screen; UK Film Council; Wild Bunch
- Distributed by: Entertainment One Films
- Release dates: 9 October 2010 (Dinard Festival); 21 January 2011 (United Kingdom)
- Running time: 125 minutes
- Countries: United Kingdom; France; Italy
- Languages: English, Scots
- Box office: £1.4 million

Neds (also known as Non-Educated Delinquents, stylised as NEDS) is a 2010 coming-of-age drama film directed and written by Peter Mullan. Set in Scotland, the film centres on John McGill (Conor McCarron), a teenager growing up in 1970s Glasgow. John's story follows his involvement with the city's youth culture and its impact on his development as a teenager.

The title is from the word Ned which is a derogatory term applied in Scotland to hooligans, louts or petty criminals. The film has received critical acclaim.

== Plot ==
Neds follows the story of John McGill, a young boy growing up in 1970s Glasgow. While a brilliant pupil who excels in his studies at school, his studious nature causes conflicts with his working-class family and the wider, gang-riddled neighbourhood.

John's immediate family consists of his mother, a part-time hospital worker; his father, an abusive, alcoholic, tool-maker; and his older brother, Benny, leader of a neighbourhood gang called the Young Car-D. On a visit from New York, his Auntie Beth encourages John to leave Scotland when he is older to pursue opportunities there.

The film opens with a leaving ceremony marking John's transition from primary to secondary school. On his final day, John is accosted by Canta, a local bully and member of the Hardridge Puka Pie Gang, or young balti as they were known who intimidates him, threatening to beat him up when he moves to secondary school. John relays the details of the encounter to his brother who enlists the help of his fellow gang members to track down and assault Canta as punishment.

Once John begins secondary school, apart from not being in the top class, everything goes well. Informed by the headmaster that he will be moved up to the appropriate level by Christmas time by proving he is different from his brother, who assaulted two teachers and was expelled, he successfully progresses. However, he finds himself socially isolated and his teacher advises him to attend a summer camp for children with disabilities. There, he becomes friendly with a middle class boy called Julian. One day, he accidentally breaks one of Julian's father's LP records and is forbidden from seeing Julian again.

While walking home, a group of Young Car-D gang members threaten to mug him until they realize whose brother he is. They stop harassing him, ask him to join them and offer John vodka and cigarettes which he accepts, marking the start of his downward spiral.

When the school year recommences, John has changed his ways for the worse: drawing graffiti on desks, being impolite to teachers and smoking cigarettes in the toilets at break time. At one point he is caught up in a fight between two gangs and obtains a knife which has been kicked under the door of the toilet cubicle in which he is hiding.

In revenge for the rejection by Julian's family, John throws a pair of football boots full of fireworks through the dining room window while they are eating. He then visits a social club, where members of the Car-D gang eject two members of rival gang The Krew. Returning, they hurl a bicycle through the function room window, urging the Car-D to give chase up to the edge of their territory where they escape via a walkway. John gives chase, running into an ambush and is in turn chased by The Krew and pursued by their leader. Escaping by pushing his way into an Irish woman's home, John evades the rival gang. It emerges later that she is the mother of the boy who hurled the bicycle.

John becomes more deeply involved in gang feuds taking place between 1972 and 1974. He slits a boy's throat in a gang fight and hides the blade. On a walk with Claire, one of the girls from the gang, John spots his one-time tormentor Canta, now an isolated and slightly pathetic character. John confronts him about the bullying incident years earlier, and agrees to move past it, but Canta makes a snide remark as he turns away. Enraged, John first knocks him to the floor, then drops a stone slab on his head, causing permanent brain damage.

Returning home he finds that the police are there and hides from them. Upon their departure, John learns that his brother has been arrested as a suspect in the stabbing. The next day he finds that his brother's bail has been set at £15 by the Sheriff court. He robs a bus driver at knife point to raise the money, but fails to pay the sum in time.

John becomes increasingly confrontational, throwing a glass bottle at a passing police officer, as he hangs out with the Young Car-D in a park, which results in them ostracizing him for attracting police attention.

His father is drunkenly abusive to his mother so John later beats him about the head with a frying pan. His mother orders John out of the house and he is forced to take refuge in the machine room in a block of high rise flats, living on deliveries of bread and milk stolen from tenants. Returning to his refuge he finds the room locked and, after sniffing glue, wanders the streets, stripped to the waist. Seeing a statue of Jesus, who John jokingly urges to come down, he has a glue-fuelled vision that Christ accepts the offer but then challenges him on his poor life choices.

The next morning, his sober dad finds John and tells him to come home. His father asks him to put him out of his misery and end his life. John goes to his room, taking two knives which he tightly straps to both hands. He goes downstairs and finds his father urinating in a bottle. He asks John to wait until he is asleep, so John wanders the streets. When he encounters members of the rival gang, he attacks one, leaving him grievously injured. Pursued by the other gang members, John is himself badly beaten. Members of Young Car-D then spot John and fight off his attackers, only to have the enraged John turn on them. Injured, he returns home to the room where his father is asleep but is unable to go through with killing him. Falling asleep, he collapses on top of him.

He chooses to change his ways and returns to school, attending a remedial class, wanting no further involvement with the gang. The class goes on a field trip to a safari park and their minibus breaks down. Thinking the teachers have abandoned him with the brain-damaged Brown (Canta), John decides to leave the van. The film closes with John and Brown walking hand-in-hand into the distance through a pride of lions, who ignore them.

== Cast ==
- Conor McCarron as John McGill
- Gregg Forrest as Young John
- Martin Bell as Julian
- Marianna Palka as Aunt Beth
- Steven Robertson as Mr Bonetti
- Gary Lewis as Mr Russell
- Khai Nugent as Tam
- Joe Szula as Benny
- Mhairi Anderson as Elizabeth
- Gary Milligan as Canta Brown
- John Joe Hay as Fergie
- Christopher Wallace as Wee T
- Richard Mack as Gerr
- Paul Smith as Keyman
- Ryan Walker as Sparra
- Lee Fanning as Minty
- Ross Greig as Fifey
- Greg McCreadie as Tora
- Scott Ingram as Casper
- Cameron Fulton as Crystal
- Craig Kerr as Rebel
- Kat Murphy as Claire
- Stefanie Szula as Linda
- Annie Watson as Agnes
- Zoë Halliday as Mandy
- Sara MacCallum as Shelagh
- Louis McLaughlin as Robert
- David O'Brien as Bernard
- Ross Weston as Danny
- Claire Gordon as Louise
- Marcus Nash as Patrick
- Peter Mullan as Mr McGill

== Reception ==
The film was well received by critics, with a 94% approval rating based on 33 reviews at aggregator site Rotten Tomatoes.

== Awards ==
At the 2011 British Academy Scotland Awards, Peter Mullan won best director and best writer for film or television for Neds; it was shortlisted for best film and Conor McCarron was shortlisted for best actor.

Neds won the Golden Shell (Best Film) at the San Sebastian Film Festival in September 2010.

== See also ==
- Glasgow gangs
- List of hood films
