= The Triple-Headed Lady =

1901 film by Georges Méliès

- Directed by: Georges Méliès
- Production company: Star Film Company
- Release date: 1901
- Country: France
- Language: Silent

The Triple-Headed Lady (French: Bouquet d'illusions) is a 1901 French silent trick film by Georges Méliès. It was sold by Méliès' Star Film Company and is numbered 334 in its catalogues.

The film was presumed lost until 2014, when Michael Zahs, a historian in rural Iowa, USA, approached film historian Serge Bromberg, who identified a single deteriorated print in a collection that had belonged to Frank Brinton, a Midwestern American traveling showman of Méliès' era. The Brinton collection was also found to contain another Méliès film presumed lost, The Wonderful Rose-Tree. The Triple-Headed Lady was restored in 2016 by the film restoration studio Lobster Films, and screened that year, for the first time since its rediscovery, at the Il Cinema Ritrovato festival in Bologna. The rediscovery and preservation of the film is celebrated in the 2018 documentary feature film Saving Brinton.
