= The Wonderful Rose-Tree =

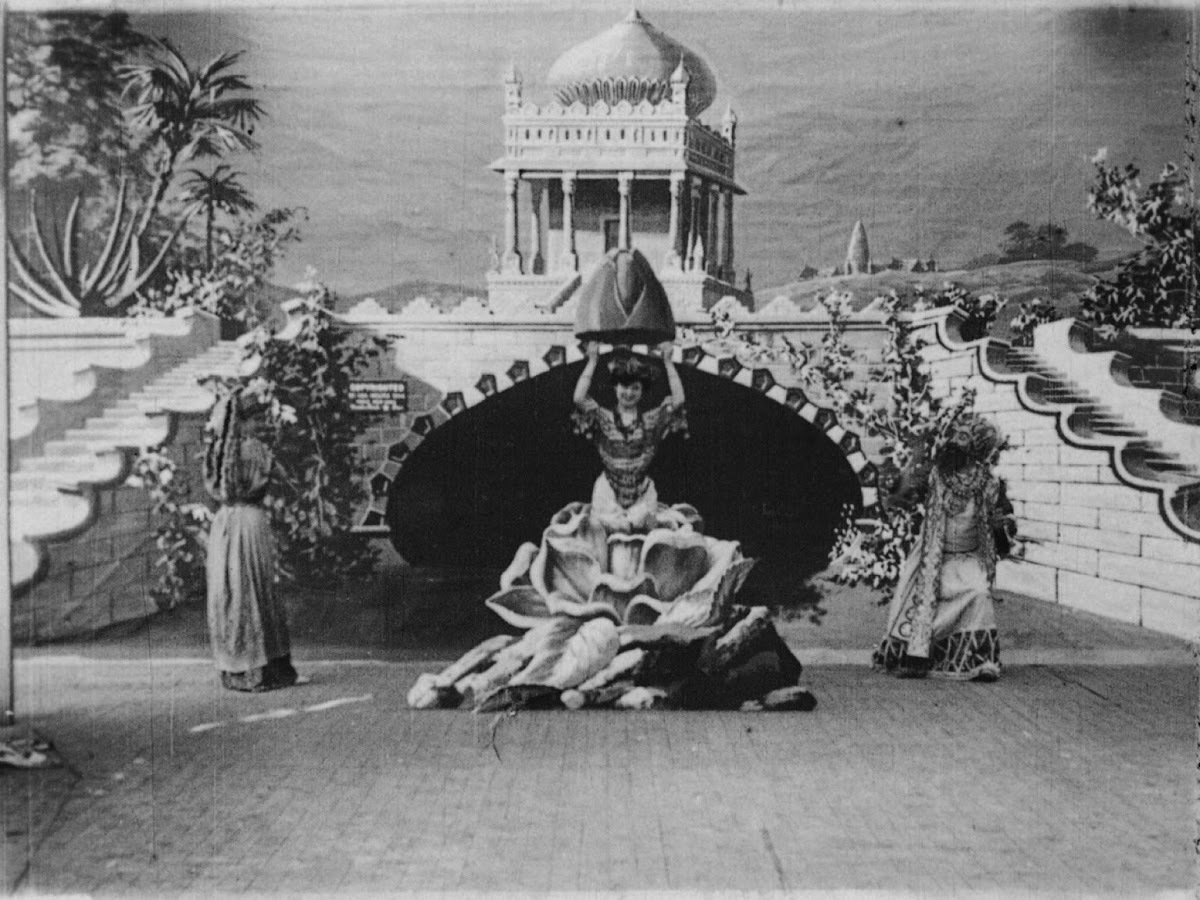
- A frame from the film
- Directed by: Georges Méliès
- Production company: Star Film Company
- Release date: 11 October 1904 (USA)
- Country: France
- Language: Silent

Le Rosier miraculeux, released in the US as The Wonderful Rose-Tree and in the UK as The Magical Rose Tree, is a 1904 French silent trick film directed by Georges Méliès.

== Plot ==
According to Méliès's catalogue description:

The Brahmin, Iftikar, who enjoys a great reputation in India, has determined to make a creation which shall place the seal upon his renown. He sows some seeds upon the carpet, prostrates himself, and in the course of his invocations, in less than an instant, the grains germinate. A small rosebush grows and produces beautiful roses. Aided by his servant, the Brahmin makes of them a magnificent bouquet, which is changed into a single enormous rose. The flower spreads out its petals and from its centre there darts forth a young and lovely woman, whom the Brahmin strives to embrace. But she eludes him and dances a fascinating serpentine dance. She disappears and the rosebush resumes its place. Iftikar destroys the rosebush and he confesses himself conquered for he has been able to create but not to preserve.

== Release and rediscovery ==
The Wonderful Rose-Tree, advertised as having been based on a legend from Hinduism, was released by Méliès' Star Film Company and is numbered 634–636 in its catalogues. It was sold both in black-and-white and, at a higher price, in a hand-coloured version. Méliès' catalogue says that the film "was made especially for coloring. Its charm and its delicate beauty are very materially enhanced by the intelligent and harmonious coloring of our artists." The film was registered for American copyright at the Library of Congress on 11 October 1904.

The film was presumed lost until the 2010s, when documentary filmmakers of Saving Brinton identified a single, damaged, but nearly complete black-and-white print in a collection that had belonged to Frank Brinton, a Midwestern American traveling showman of Méliès' era. The Brinton collection was also found to contain another Méliès film presumed lost, The Triple-Headed Lady. The Wonderful Rose-Tree was screened, for the first time since its rediscovery, at the Pordenone Silent Film Festival in 2017.
