= Brinton Collection =

Collection of early cinematography

The Brinton Collection is a collection of early cinematography that was used by William Franklin Brinton (1857–1919) for his traveling show in the Midwestern United States.

== William Franklin Brinton ==
Brinton was the Washington, Iowa Graham Opera House manager; a public speaker; an inventor; solar house builder; airship builder; movie house projectionist. Brinton married Elizabeth Norris and had 4 children. Brinton later married Indiana Putman, health food advocate and nudist.

== Background ==
It was preserved and discovered by history teacher, Michael Zahs, in a barn in Ainsworth, Iowa.

== Collection ==
The collection included footage of Teddy Roosevelt, the world's first newsreel involving the 1900 Galveston hurricane and works by Georges Méliès that were thought to have been lost: The Wonderful Rose-Tree and The Triple-Headed Lady.

== Legacy ==
The collection's history was recounted in a film documentary, Saving Brinton, in 2018.
