= Daughter of Dawn =

1920 film

The Daughter of Dawn
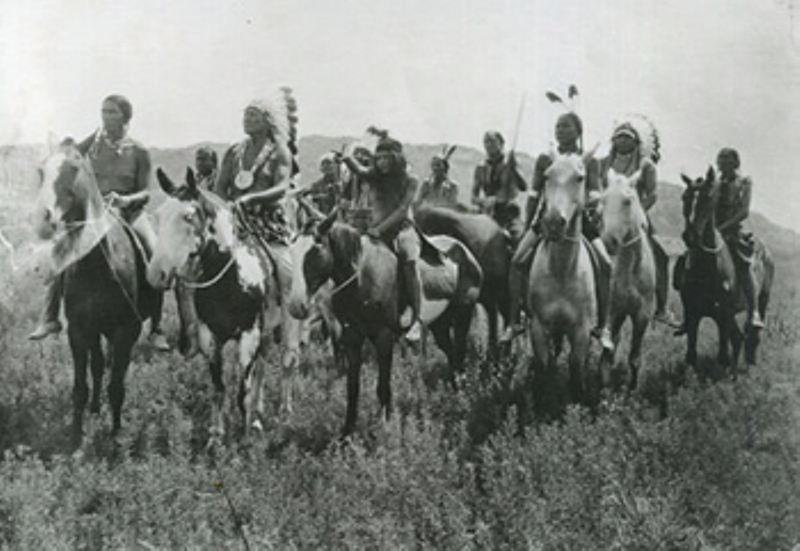
- Still from the film
- Directed by: Norbert A. Myles
- Written by: Richard Banks; Norbert A. Myles
- Produced by: Richard Banks
- Starring: Hunting Horse; Oscar Yellow Wolf; Esther LaBarre; White Parker; Wanada Parker; Jack Sankeydoty
- Production company: Texas Film Company
- Distributed by: Milestone Films
- Release date: October 1920
- Running time: 83 minutes
- Country: United States
- Languages: Silent; English intertitles

The Daughter of Dawn is a 1920 American silent Western film. It is 83 minutes long and is one of few silent films made, along with In the Land of the Head Hunters and Before the White Man Came (1920), with an entirely Native American cast.

Between its production and restoration in 2012, it was shown only a few times — once in Los Angeles in 1920, and in Kansas City, Tulsa and a handful of other cities.

In 2013, the film was selected for preservation in the United States National Film Registry by the Library of Congress as being "culturally, historically, or aesthetically significant".

Full film

== Plot ==
The film focuses around a love triangle. The lead female character is Dawn, played by Esther LeBarre, daughter of the chief of the Kiowa (played by Hunting Horse.) Dawn wishes to wed White Eagle (played by White Parker, son of Comanche leader Quanah Parker) but her father wants her to also consider the powerful and influential Black Wolf, played by Jack Sankadota. Wanada Parker (also a child of Quanah Parker) plays Red Wing, another woman in love with Black Wolf. The film features depictions of typical Plains Indian life, including a battle scene, traditional dances and bison hunting.

== Production ==
The film features an "all-Indian cast...shot in Indian Country", with over 300 people from the Comanche and Kiowa tribes acting in the film, including White and Wanada Parker, children of Quanah Parker. The cast wore their own clothing and brought their own personal items, including tepees. The film features the "Tipi with Battle Pictures", which is a tepee in the collection of the Oklahoma Historical Society. There are lances and tomahawks in the film which represent honors earned in war by the Kiowa. Daughter of Dawn was filmed in May, June and July 1920. The filming took place in the Wichita Mountains.

The Daughter of Dawn was one of many docudramas that tended to romanticize Native American culture and lifestyle during the early 1910s and '20s. Other films of the period that boasted of all-Indian casts included In the Land of the Head Hunters (1914); Hiawatha (1913), shot by F.E. Moore's production company; The Vanishing Race, a 1917 film made by the Edison Studios; and Before the White Man Came (1920), which employed Crow Indians and Cheyenne Indians as actors.

The film score was never completed.

== Acquisition and restoration ==
The Daughter of Dawn was rumored to exist, but was not in any archive and feared to be a lost film. In 2005, the Oklahoma City Museum of Art's Brian Hearn was offered the film for $35,000 by a private investigator, who had been paid for a job with the film. Two years later, the Oklahoma Historical Society (OHS), which has film stills and the script, purchased it for $5,000.

Upon purchase, there were five reels comprising the film. Some sections were joined with masking tape. The OHS applied for grants to digitize the film, which is 83 minutes long. A film score was created by David Yeagley and performed by students at Oklahoma City University. The film was shown at Fort Larned National Historic Site in 2013. The restored version was released on DVD by Milestone films.

== See also ==
- National Film Preservation Foundation
- List of rediscovered films
