= Pages of Death =

- Produced by: Charles Keating
- Starring: Tom Harmon; Mark Allan; Vivi Janiss; John Larch; Paul Picerni
- Production company: Citizens for Decent Literature
- Release date: 1962
- Running time: 27:13
- Country: United States
- Language: English

"Pages of Death" is a 1962 anti-pornography short film was made in the United States by the Citizens for Decent Literature and produced by Charles Keating. It was thought to be lost until it was rediscovered in 2016.

== Plot synopsis ==
Karen Flemming, a cheerful and bright girl, goes missing while walking home from school. Her parents initially don't worry about her, but when she misses out on dinner they call the police. The police trace her whereabouts to a drug store, where they find an older boy named Paul Halliday. Paul denies ever having contact with her. Karen's body is later found, with indications that she's been sexually assaulted. The police go to question Paul and find numerous pornographic magazines and films in his room. Paul eventually confesses to killing Karen. A narrator (played by Tom Harmon) says the porn industry is the cause of Karen's death.

== Production ==
The film was made by the Hour of St. Francis radio program and distributed by the Citizens for Decent Literature. The producer of the film was Charles Keating, a vocal anti-pornography advocate, having founded the CDL and acting as a member in the 1969 President's Commission on Obscenity and Pornography appointed by Richard Nixon.

== Cast ==
- Narrator – Tom Harmon
- Ben – Mark Allan
- Ms. Flemming – Vivi Janiss
- Councilman Halliday – John Larch
- Lead Cop – Paul Picerni

== Rediscovery ==
The film was thought to have been lost after it was initially released, and was put on many lists of films that had been lost. In 2016, a 16mm film roll was found in the possession of the Oregon Historical Society. The film is now available on YouTube on the OHS' channel.

== See also ==
- List of rediscovered films
