= Kliou the Tiger =

1935 silent film directed by Henry de La Falaise

Kliou the Tiger [also known as Kliou, the Killer] is a 1935 silent film directed by Henry de La Falaise. It is the first movie filmed in Indochina, one of the last silent film ever released by Hollywood, and the final film to be released in two-colored technicolor. Until the year 2000, the film was considered lost.

== Plot ==
The story is told through the words of a white adventurer residing in a French outpost in the form of a flashback.

Bhat is a member of the Moi tribe in the Annamese Jungles in Indochina (now Central Vietnam). Bhat is in love with a woman named Dhi, but her father, Khan, does not believe Bhat is worthy of his daughter as he lacks hunting and warrior prowess. Meanwhile, a tiger, Kliou, has been attacking Moi villages, taking people and livestock. During a hunt, Khan is severely mauled by the claws of Kliou. Witch doctors claim that Khan can only be saved if Kliou experiences a similar injury.

Bhat teams up with Nyan, Dhi's younger brother, to hunt Kliou. After traversing the dangerous jungle, they manage to find Kliou's trail and wound them with a poisoned arrow. Kliou is killed, and Bhat is hailed as a hero, Khan recovers from his attack, and Bhat and Dhi are reunited.

== Production ==
The movie was filmed in Vietnam, with most of the actors being natives of the area. Due to this, the actors are unknown.

The film was written by Paul Perez and Ray Doyle and edited by Ralph Dietrich. The photography was done by W. Howard Greene, and the music was created by Heinz Roemheld, S.K. Wineland, and Abe Meyer.

== Critical reception ==
Variety wrote that the color is "good, nicely catching the lush and multi-pigments of the jungle country", but the film is "scarcely more than a travelog [sic]." It also wrote that the "film is silent, when it would have been much enhanced by sound, absence of which is inexplicable."

== Rediscovery ==
The film's premiere was August 14, 1937.

The original color version is likely lost, but in the early 2000s, a black and white print was found in the collection of Gerald Haber, a film historian who collected black and white films made from the 1920's to the 1940's.

The film was shown at the Press Cafe in Hanoi, Vietnam in 2010.

The film was also included by Milestone Videos as an extra on DVDs of Legong, another film by Henry de La Falaise.

== See also ==
- Lost media
- List of lost films
