= Os Óculos do Vovô =

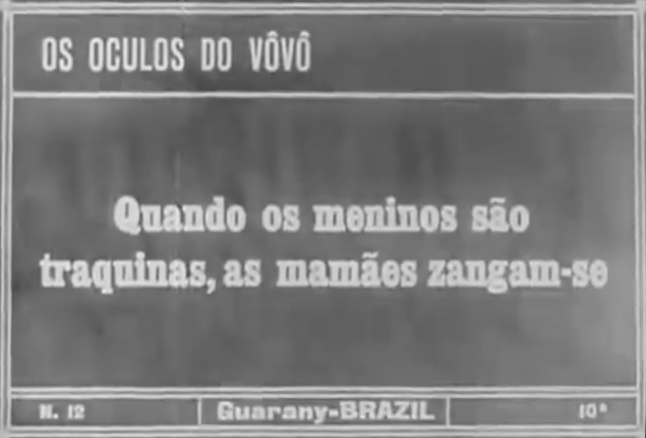
- "When boys are naughty, moms get mad"
- Directed by: Francisco Santos
- Cinematography: Francisco Xavier
- Production company: Guarany Fábrica de Fitas Cinematográficas
- Distributed by: Guarany Fábrica de Fitas Cinematográficas
- Release date: 1 May 1913 (Brazil)
- Running time: 15 minutes
- Country: Brazil
- Language: Mute

Os Óculos do Vovô (Grandpa's Glasses) is a Brazilian silent film from 1913, and the oldest Brazilian fiction film still preserved.

Directed by the Portuguese Francisco Dias Ferreira dos Santos (1873–1937), the film was originally produced in the city of Pelotas by the company Guarany Fábrica de Fitas Cinematográficas. Fragments of it were rescued in the 1970s and the version that's been preserved is just over four minutes.

== Plot ==
Surviving footage from Os Óculos do Vovô

The film tells the simple but amusing story of a "naughty" boy who paints the lenses of his sleeping grandfather's glasses. The man wakes up and thinks he has gone blind, creating a series of confusions in the house.

== Cast ==
Name	Character
Francisco Santos	Grandpa
Jorge Diniz	Alberto Silva (Father)
Graziela Diniz	Mother
Oscar Araújo	Doctor Silveira
Mário Ferreira dos Santos	Grandchild

== Production ==
The short film was produced by Guarany Fábrica de Fitas Cinematográficas in 1913, in the city of Pelotas. The location chosen was Souza Soares Park. The director was Francisco Santos, who also wrote and played the character "grandpa". The grandson was played by Mário Ferreira dos Santos. Only 4 minutes and 34 seconds of the work, which originally had two parts, were rescued.

== Rediscovery ==
The short was considered lost for years until Michael Antônio Jesus Pfeil, a researcher, identified a copy in São Paulo, held by Yolanda l'Huillier, Francisco Santos' granddaughter. The material was retrieved at the School of Communications and Arts of USP and had his own soundtrack added.

== Release ==
The short film was released on 1 May 1913 at the Coliseu Santa Mariense in Santa Maria. In 2009, it was shown at the Festival de Gramado.
