= Leonard Cohen: Bird on a Wire =

- German theatrical quad poster
- Directed by: Tony Palmer
- Written by: Tony Palmer
- Produced by: Rob Ayling; Marty Machat; Steven Machat
- Cinematography: Les Young
- Edited by: Tony Palmer
- Music by: Leonard Cohen
- Release date: July 1974
- Running time: 106 minutes
- Country: United States
- Language: English

Leonard Cohen: Bird on a Wire, originally titled Bird on a Wire, is a 1974 documentary that chronicles a troubled 1972 concert tour of Europe and Israel by the Canadian singer and songwriter Leonard Cohen.

It was directed by British filmmaker Tony Palmer, with cinematography by Les Young. The film takes its name from the Cohen song Bird on the Wire.

The film, after extensive re-editing from its initial version, opened in London in 1974. It was shown on German television, but it disappeared for decades and was considered a lost film. Its original version, restored by the director, was released on DVD in 2010 and had its first theatrical release in 2017.

== Synopsis ==
The film shows Cohen on a spring 1972 tour of Europe and Israel, accompanied by two guitarists; a bass and fiddle player; Bob Johnston, a record producer, and backup singers Donna Washburn and Jennifer Warnes. It begins toward the end of the tour in Tel Aviv, and shows Cohen scolding aggressive security guards during a fan riot.

Considerable technical problems plagued Cohen throughout the tour, including constant audio difficulties that resulted in a tense confrontation with fans in Copenhagen who wanted a refund because the show ended early. The film also has backstage scenes of Cohen giving interviews and interacting with fans, including a female fan who "baldly propositions" him. It ends with Cohen's final stop on the tour, at Jerusalem's Binyanei Hauma on April 21, 1972, in which Cohen has an emotional crisis and takes LSD backstage.

== Production ==
The film chronicles a difficult period in Cohen's life, a time he later described as “confused and directionless.” His most recent album, Songs of Love and Hate, was selling poorly. CBS Records was ready to drop him from the label, and his career "was on the verge of complete disaster" according to Rolling Stone. The tour was intended to restore momentum to his career.

Cohen was unenthusiastic about the tour and about being filmed, but Palmer won him over by bringing a copy of one of his books of poetry to a meeting. Palmer was granted total access to Cohen during the tour, with the filmmaker even showing Cohen showering with male band members.

Before the tour began, Palmer and Cohen agreed that he would film only one out of every five concerts, on the grounds that he would be doing the same songs in every one.

Palmer edited the 40 hours of raw footage into a two-hour documentary with the title Bird on a Wire. Cohen reacted emotionally to the film on viewing it for the first time in early 1973. His biographer, Sylvie Simmons, recounts that he wept for about half the time and called it "too true" and saying that he was happy with the way it turned out. The BBC bought the film, covering three-quarters of production costs.

=== Initial version rejected ===
A week after seeing the film, Cohen's lawyer and manager Marty Machat called Palmer and said that there was a "problem", that Cohen believed that the film was "too confrontational". Palmer told Rolling Stone that Cohen "didn't like it or dislike it. I think he was very surprised by the intimacy of it. The word he kept using was he was 'confrontational,' which I never understood. He was also worried it started with the [Tel Aviv] riot."

An assistant editor, Humphrey Dixon, volunteered to resolve Cohen's concerns, and Cohen hired Henry Zemel to work with Dixon on the editing. The re-editing process cost was costly, coming to about $500,000. Cohen said in a Melody Maker interview that the film was "totally unacceptable," that he was paying out of his own pocket to remake it, and that once it was finished he would "get out of the scene" and "return to another rhythm."

The revised film had its World premiere at The Rainbow Theatre in London on 5 July 1974 but received only limited release. The BBC had by then decided not to broadcast it, and except for a showing on German television it disappeared from circulation for nearly four decades.

=== Restoration and re-release ===
Palmer had failed to keep a copy of his original edit and over time he thought the film had been lost. In 2009, he received a phone call from Herb Cohen, Frank Zappa's former manager, telling him that he had located dozens of boxes labelled "Bird on a Wire." Machat had died in 1988, but his son Steven obtained and delivered all 296 film canisters to Palmer. Since the negative was not available, Palmer used the soundtrack to reconstruct the film to its original form.

The film stock was in fragile condition, some disintegrating to the touch. Restoring the film required piecing together the film from 3,000 fragments. The film was then sent to Cohen, who wrote back that he was "glad the problem has been resolved." The restored version was premiered at the Green Man festival in 2012. A DVD release followed, coinciding with a world tour, and then the film was released theatrically in 2017, premiering in New York City.

== Critical reception ==
The film has a score of 79 on Metacritic, indicating generally favorable reviews. Commenting on the 2017 re-release, The New York Times said that Palmer captured the tour with a "keen eye". The film was described as "a worthy time capsule and a must for Cohen devotees," with "occasional meanderings into artiness."

== See also ==
- Bird on the Wire
- List of rediscovered films
