= Living London =

1904 film directed by Charles Urban

Living London is a 1904 English documentary film of life in London. It was produced by Charles Urban.

The film was released in Australia in 1906 and was a sensation, being seen by over 500,000 people. It was distributed by J and N Tait, and their success with the movie encouraged them to make The Story of the Kelly Gang.

The film was thought to have been lost, but ten minutes of footage was discovered in the Corrick Collection in Australia's National Film and Sound Archive in 2007 and restored. The website charlesurban.com, however, claims that the footage is actually from Urban's 1906 documentary The Streets of London.

New Zealand writer Ngaio Marsh created a mythic picture in her fiction of England, which she romanticized from seeing Living London.
