= Big Banana Feet =

- British quad poster
- Directed by: Murray Grigor; David Peat
- Written by: Billy Connolly; Murray Grigor; Patrick Higson
- Starring: Billy Connolly
- Distributed by: Brent Walker Film Distributors
- Release date: 24 August 1977 (United Kingdom)
- Running time: 77 minutes
- Language: English

Big Banana Feet is a 1976 comedy documentary film following Billy Connolly on his 1975 tour of Ireland. The film was directed by Murray Grigor and David Peat, and was made in two days.

In 2012, the film was restored from a single remaining copy in an American film archive.
