= Marcus Nash (actor) =

Scottish actor and media afficianado (born 1994)

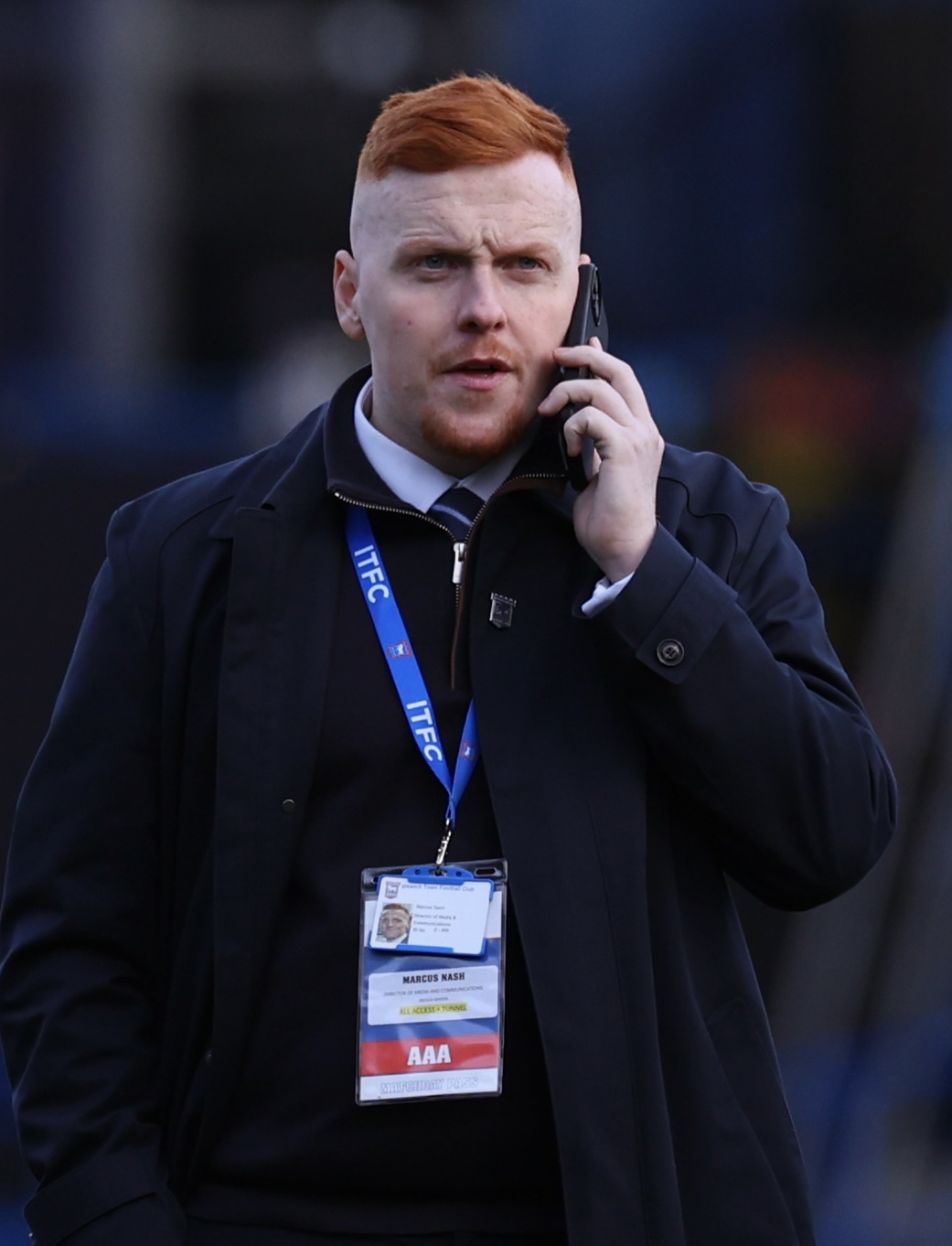
- Born: Marcus Workman Nash; 15 February 1994 (age 32); Glasgow, Scotland
- Occupations: Director of Media & Communications Ipswich Town FC

Marcus Nash (born 15 February 1994) is a former Scottish actor and current Director of Media & Communications at Ipswich Town FC. He was initially known for starring as Herod Sharkey in the CBBC television series Half Moon Investigations, based on the best-selling novels by Eoin Colfer. Nash also appeared in the BBC Scotland soap opera River City and featured in Peter Mullan’s film Neds. Following his acting career, Nash transitioned into sports communications, serving as Head of Communications & Media Relations at Hamilton Academical FC from May 2018. During his time there, he helped modernise the club’s media approach and improve engagement strategies. In August 2021, he joined Ipswich Town, where he has since become a key figure in shaping the club’s growing reputation off the pitch.

== Film ==
Year	Film	Role
2011	Neds	Patrick

== Television ==
Year	Programme	Role	Notes
2009	Half Moon Investigations	Herod Sharkey	
2011	River City	Ally	
