= Mário Ferreira dos Santos =

Brazilian philosopher

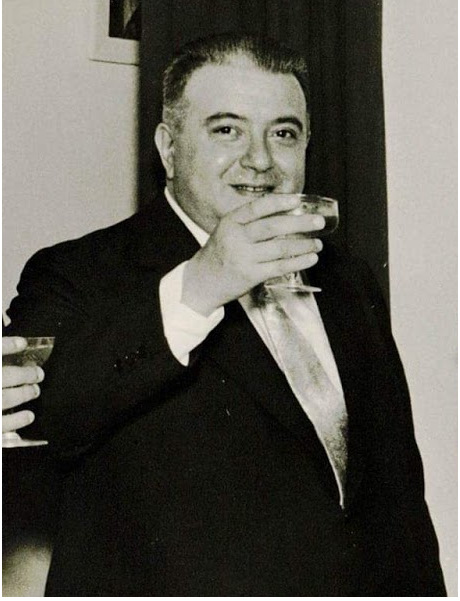
- In 1958
- Born: 3 January 1907; Tietê, São Paulo, Brazil
- Died: 11 April 1968 (aged 61); São Paulo, Brazil
- Resting place: Cemitério do Araçá, São Paulo, Brazil
- Spouse: Yolanda Duro Lhullier (m. 1929)
- Children: Nadiejda Santos Nunes Galvão; Yolanda dos Santos

Philosophical work
- Era: 20th-century philosophy
- Region: Western philosophy
- School: Pythagoreanism; Neoplatonism; Thomism; Scotism; Mutualism
- Main interests: Dialectic; Logic; Ontology Epistemology; Psychology Anthropology; Sociology; Theology; Antroposophy

Mário Ferreira dos Santos (Brazilian Portuguese: [ˈmaɾju feˈʁejɾɐ dus ˈsɐ̃tus]; 1907–1968) was a Brazilian philosopher, writer, translator, and anarchist activist. He is best known for developing a philosophical system he called Concrete Philosophy.

Ferreira published, in less than fifteen years, the 45-volume Encyclopedia of Philosophical and Social Sciences.

== Biography ==
=== Early years ===
Born in Tietê, Ferreira came from a family of lawyers and jurists. He was raised in Pelotas, where he studied at a Jesuit school. His father, Francisco Santos (pt), a Portuguese immigrant who pioneered cinema in Brazil and a godson of Camilo Castelo Branco, cast him in the silent Os Óculos do Vovô, the earliest Brazilian film preserved.

At school, Ferreira excelled at calligraphy, arithmetics, grammar, geometry, French, and English, having co-founded and presided over a literary club named Academia Literária Ruy Barbosa. In the preface to his book Filosofia e Cosmovisão, Ferreira recalls that he was initiated into philosophy by a German professor, who was impressed by the liveliness and intelligence of his Brazilian students, while also remarking on their deficiency in basic disciplines.

=== Adulthood ===
Ferreira enrolled at the Faculty of Law of Porto Alegre, where he made the acquaintance of the novelist Erico Verissimo and the poet Mario Quintana. In 1928, he began his career in journalism with the article O poeta da luz e da cor. He graduated in 1930, and spent the following years working as a lawyer and journalist.

Although initially supportive of the Revolution of 1930, Ferreira was arrested by the newly instituted government for his harsh criticism of its authoritarian policies.

In the 1940s, he began working as a translator, rendering into Portuguese a plethora of authors, including Nietzsche, Goethe, Plato, Amiel, Balzac, Pascal, and Whitman.

== Philosophical work ==
His system, the concrete philosophy, is built upon the méthode des démonstrations géométriques, which, according to Ferreira, no possibility of disagreement from its assumptions – which he called "theses". The first thesis is the foundation of his philosophy: "There is something whilst there isn't the absolute nothing", from which he draws other theses through the geometric methods.

== Works ==
The list of Ferreira's works was first compiled by Olavo de Carvalho, who also discovered the division of Mário's encyclopedia into three "series".

=== Section I - Enciclopédia das ciências filosóficas ===
==== First series ====
- Filosofia e cosmovisão. São Paulo, Edanee, 1952 (6a ed., São Paulo, Logos, 1961).
- Lógica e dialéctica. São Paulo, Logos, 1953 (5a ed., São Paulo, Logos, 1964).
- Psicologia. São Paulo, Logos, 1953 (5a ed., São Paulo, Logos, 1963).
- Teoria do conhecimento (gnosiologia e criteriologia). São Paulo, Logos, 1954 (4a ed., São Paulo, Logos, 1964).
- Ontologia e cosmologia. São Paulo, Logos, 1954 (4a ed., São Paulo, Logos, 1964).
- Tratado de simbólica. São Paulo, Logos, 1956 (5a ed., São Paulo, Logos, 1964).
- Filosofia da crise. São Paulo, Logos, 1956 (5a ed., São Paulo, Logos, 1964).
- O homem perante o infinito (teologia). São Paulo, Logos, 1956 (5a ed., São Paulo, Logos, 1963).
- Noologia geral (A ciência do espírito). São Paulo, Logos, 1956 (3a ed., São Paulo, Logos, 1961).
- Filosofia concreta. São Paulo, Logos, 1957 (4a ed., revista e ampliada, 3 vols., São Paulo, Logos, 1961).

==== Second series ====
===== (A) Published =====
- Filosofia concreta dos valores. São Paulo, Logos, 1960 (3a ed., São Paulo, Logos, 1964).
- Sociologia fundamental e ética fundamental. São Paulo, Logos, 1957 (3a ed., São Paulo, Logos, 1964).
- Pitágoras e o tema do número. São Paulo, Logos, 1956 (2a ed., São Paulo, Matese, 1965), Ibrasa, 2000.
- Aristóteles e as mutações (tradução e comentário de Da geração e da corrupção das coisas físicas, de Aristóteles). São Paulo, Logos, 1955 (2a ed., São Paulo, Logos, 1958).
- O um e o múltiplo em Platão (tradução e comentário do Parmênides, de Platão). São Paulo, Logos, 1958.55
- Métodos lógicos e dialécticos, 2 vols. São Paulo, Logos, 1959 (4a ed., revista e ampliada, 3 vols., São Paulo, Logos, 1965).
- Filosofias da afirmação e da negação. São Paulo, Logos, 1959.56
- Tratado de economia, 2 vols. São Paulo, Logos, 1962.
- Filosofia e história da cultura, 3 vols. São Paulo, Logos, 1962.
- Análise de temas sociais, 3 vols. São Paulo, Logos, 1962 (2a ed., São Paulo, Logos, 1964).
- O problema social. São Paulo, Logos, 1964 (2a ed., São Paulo, Logos, 1964).
- Dicionário de filosofia e ciências culturais, 4 vols. São Paulo, Matese, 1963 (4a ed., São Paulo, Matese, 1966).
- Origem dos grandes erros filosóficos. São Paulo, Matese, 1965.
- Grandezas e misérias da logística. São Paulo, Matese, 1967.
- Erros na filosofia da natureza. São Paulo, Matese, 1967.
- Das categorias, de Aristóteles (tradução, notas e comentários). São Paulo, Matese, 1960 (2a ed., São Paulo, Matese, 1965).
- Isagoge, de Porfírio (tradução, notas e comentários). São Paulo, Matese, 1965.
- Protágoras, de Platão (tradução, notas e introdução). São Paulo, Matese, 1965.
- O Apocalipse de S. João: A revelação dos Livros Sagrados. São Paulo: Cone Sul, 1998.

===== (B) Unpublished =====
- Comentários a S. Boaventura. Original datilografado, 100 pp.
- As três críticas de Kant. Original datilografado, 226 pp.
- Comentário aos "Versos Áureos" de Pitágoras. Original datilografado, 88 pp.; mais tradução dos Comentários de Hiérocles, 57 pp.
- Cristianismo, a religião do homem. Original datilografado, 69 pp. 57
- Tao Te Ching, de Lao-Tsé (tradução e comentários). Original datilografado, 85 pp.

===== (C) Scattered and fragments =====
- Filosofia e romantismo. Inacabado. Original datilografado, 42 pp.
- Brasil, país de excepção. Inacabado. Original datilografado, 50 pp.
- Sto. Tomás e a Sabedoria — e outras palestras inéditas. Transcrição datilografada, 158 pp.
- Enéadas, de Plotino. Tradução. Original datilografado, 179 pp. O comentário anunciado não chegou a ser escrito.
- De Primo Principio, de John Duns Scot. Tradução. Original datilografado, 68 pp. O comentário anunciado não chegou a ser escrito.
- Da interpretação, de Aristóteles. Tradução. Original datilografado, 36 pp. O comentário anunciado não chegou a ser escrito.

==== Third series ====
===== (A) Published =====
- A sabedoria dos princípios. São Paulo, Matese, 1967.
- A sabedoria da unidade. São Paulo, Matese, 1968.
- A sabedoria do Ser e do Nada, 2 vols. São Paulo, Matese, 1968 (póstumo).
- A sabedoria das leis eternas. Edição, notas e introdução por Olavo de Carvalho. São Paulo: E Realizações, 2001.

===== (B) Unpublished =====
- Dialéctica concreta. Original datilografado, 196 pp.
- Tratado de esquematologia. Original datilografado, 215 pp.
- Teoria geral das tensões. Inacabado. Original datilografado, 131 pp.
- Deus. Original datilografado, 228 pp.

=== Section II – Isolated books ===
- O problema social. São Paulo: Logos, 1962 (2a ed., São Paulo: Logos).
- Curso de oratória e retórica. São Paulo: Logos, 1953 (12a ed., São Paulo: Logos).
- O homem que nasceu póstumo: temas nietzschianos. São Paulo: Logos, 1954 (3a ed., São Paulo: Logos).
- Assim falava Zaratustra. São Paulo: Logos, 1954 (3a ed., São Paulo: Logos).
- Técnica do discurso moderno. São Paulo: Logos, 1953 (5a ed., São Paulo: Logos).
- Práticas de oratória. São Paulo: Logos, 1957 (5a ed., São Paulo: Logos).
- Curso de integração pessoal. São Paulo: Logos, 1954 (6a ed., São Paulo: Logos).
- Análise dialética do marxismo. São Paulo: Logos, 1954.11
- Páginas várias. São Paulo: Logos, 1960 (10a ed., São Paulo: Logos).
- Assim Deus falou aos homens. São Paulo: Logos, 1958 (2a ed., São Paulo: Logos).
- Vida não é argumento. São Paulo: Logos, 1958 (2a ed., São Paulo: Logos).
- A casa das paredes geladas. São Paulo: Logos, 1958 (2a ed., São Paulo: Logos).
- Escutai em silêncio. São Paulo: Logos, 1958 (2a ed., São Paulo: Logos).
- A verdade e o símbolo. São Paulo: Logos, 1958 (2a ed., São Paulo: Logos).
- A arte e a vida. São Paulo: Logos, 1958 (2a ed., São Paulo: Logos).
- A luta dos contrários. São Paulo: Logos, 1958 (2a ed., São Paulo: Logos).
- Certas sutilezas humanas. São Paulo: Logos, 1958 (2a ed., São Paulo: Logos).
- Convite à estética. São Paulo: Logos, 1961 (6a ed., São Paulo: Logos).
- Convite à psicologia prática. São Paulo: Logos, 1961 (6a ed., São Paulo: Logos).
- Convite à filosofia. São Paulo: Logos, 1961 (6a ed., São Paulo: Logos).
- Dicionário de pedagogia e puericultura. São Paulo: Matese, 1965, 3v. 59
- Invasão vertical dos bárbaros. São Paulo: Matese, 1967.

== See also ==
- Christian anarchism
