= Cineteca Italiana =

Italian film archive

Cineteca Italiana is a private film archive located in Milan, Italy, established in 1947, and as a foundation in 1996.

== History ==
Established in 1947, and as a foundation in 1996, the Cineteca Italiana houses over 20,000 films and more than 100,000 photographs from the history of Italian and international cinema.

Particularly important is the nitrate film section; the International Federation of Film Archives (FIAF) has defined the Cineteca Italiana as one of the most important silent film archives in Europe. The Cineteca is active in the restoration of films, which are presented in the main international cinema events and in the screening rooms of the Cineteca.

The Cineteca manages the museum, opened in 1985 at Dugnani Palace, dedicated to the cinema of the origins, transferred and enlarged in 2012 together with the Cineteca offices in the former Tobacco Factory in viale Fulvio Testi 121 in collaboration with the Lombardy Region. In the same building there are the Civic School of Cinema "Luchino Visconti" and the Lombard branch of the Centro Sperimentale di Cinematografia.

Among the other assets of the Cineteca is a large collection of original screenplays and a corpus of 15,000 silent and sound cinema posters. Since 1997, the Cineteca has curated an editorial series dedicated to the history of cinema, the Quaderni Fondazione Cineteca Italiana.

== See also ==
- Cinema of Italy
- Cineteca Nazionale
