= White Parker =

Comanche missionary (1887–1956)

White Parker (1887–1956) was a son of Mah-Cheeta-Wookey and Quanah Parker, chief of the Comanches. He married Laura E. Clark (1890-1962), a daughter of Reverend and Mrs. M. A. Clark, a former Methodist missionary to the Comanches. They had at least three children: Patty Bertha, Cynthia Ann Joy, and Milton Quanah (1914-1930).

== Missionary work ==
White Parker did Christian missionary work among the Comanche people. He studied for the ministry at Cook Bible School in Phoenix, Arizona. After graduation, Parker joined the Methodist Conference. The Parkers were active in the 1920s and '30s Saturday afternoon street meetings in Lawton, Oklahoma, which was led by Rev. J. Leighton Read, a European-American missionary from Colony, Oklahoma.

Parker had a varied religious background. His father was a member of and leader in the Native American Church. The Parker family brought the first non-Catholic church to the Comanche in the state of Texas. He received his education at a Presbyterian/Reformed institution, but affiliated with the Methodists when no Reformed missionary appointment was available.

== Acting career ==
In 1920, Parker played a lead role in the silent film The Daughter of Dawn, a silent film directed by Norbert A. Myles shot in the Wichita Mountains of Southwest Oklahoma. The story, played by an all-Indian cast of 300 Kiowas and Comanches, includes themes of love story, battle, dance, deceit, combat, and concludes with a happy ending.

This is a historically important film in American cinema as it is the first full-length movie of an American Indian story, and that uses all American Indian actors. The film was restored by the Oklahoma Historical Society and has been digitized.

== Death and legacy ==
White Parker and his wife are buried in the Highland Cemetery, Lawton, Comanche County, Oklahoma.
