= David Peat =

David Peat (22 March 1947 – 16 April 2012) was an award-winning Scottish documentary-maker, cinematographer and photographer.

== Early life and education ==
Peat was born in Glasgow, Scotland. As a young man he worked in his family's shipping company.

== Career ==
In the 1970s Peat worked as a film cameraman, shooting documentaries for well-known producers, including the BBC's Paul Hamann, and Roger Graef.

Peat produced a number of action and physical shoots, including The Legend of Los Tayos in the Amazonian jungle, with Bill Forsyth.

Peat worked on arts films for cinema and television with Scottish film-maker, Murray Grigor, (The Hand of Adam, Frank Lloyd Wright, Blast!). Two of these featured Billy Connolly (Clydescope, Big Banana Feet).

Peat began directing and film-making with the encouragement of producer Steve Clark-Hall, delivering a weekly programme Years Ahead on Channel Four in 1983.

From then until his death he worked in television, making many individual films, directing and a number of series. One of his more comprehensive series was Scotland on Film, which was created for BBC Scotland.

Peat became best known as a film-maker for his observational documentaries, (Gutted, This Mine is Ours, Me and My Face, Life's Too Short, Please Leave The Light On, and others, often acting as a director-cameraman.

In later years he taught both College courses and training classes at the BBC.

Peat died of cancer in Glasgow, Scotland, 16 April 2012.

Two retrospective photographic exhibitions of Peat's work have been held since his death, and a book, An Eye on the World: The Street Photographs of David Peat, has been produced.
