= Cineteca Nazionale =

Italian film archive

Cineteca Nazionale is a film archive located in Rome, Italy. It was founded in 1949. By law it manages the so-called legal deposit, with the task of collecting, preserving and disseminating the productions of Italian cinema. It is the only Italian film library that enjoys the right of mandatory legal deposit of all films produced and co-produced in Italy and registered in the Public Film Register held by the SIAE. It is part of the nonprofit foundation Centro Sperimentale di Cinematografia.

== History ==
Established in 1949, based in Rome, the Cineteca Nazionale preserves all the films of Italian nationality produced since then. It arose from the archival heritage of the Centro Sperimentale di Cinematografia, which in 1943, had been removed by the Nazi occupiers, losing unique materials. The films, sent to Germany, were lost in the course of World War II and many attempts to trace them in Germany and the Soviet Union after the war were unsuccessful.

There are 60,000 film titles on file, 600,000 photographs, 50,000 posters and the collection of the Italian Association for the History of Cinema Research (AIRSC). This is accompanied by the restoration of significant works and collaboration with foreign institutions for the distribution of Italian films at festivals and events around the world.

The film archive is housed in the headquarters of the Experimental Cinematography Center of Rome, in via Tuscolana 1524, and in the branch office in Ivrea which houses the National Corporate Cinema Archive.

In addition to Italian films, the Cineteca holds several thousand foreign films, acquired through exchanges with film libraries from other countries that are members of the International Federation of Film Archives (FIAF).

== See also ==
- Cinema of Italy
- Centro Sperimentale di Cinematografia
- Cineteca Italiana
