= Saving Brinton =

2018 American film on early cinematography by Tommy Haines and Andrew Sherburne

- Directed by: Tommy Haines; Andrew Sherburne
- Starring: Michael Zahs
- Cinematography: John Richard
- Music by: Michael Kramer
- Production company: Barn Owl Pictures
- Release dates: June 17, 2017 (AFI Docs); May 18, 2018 (United States)
- Running time: 87 minutes
- Country: United States
- Language: English

Saving Brinton is a 2017 American documentary film about the efforts of Iowa resident Mike Zahs to preserve a large quantity of reels of film from the late 19th and early 20th centuries that he found in the basement of a farm house. It premiered at AFI Docs on June 17, 2017 and internationally at the International Film Festival Rotterdam. Ann Hornaday of The Washington Post calls it one of 2018's "best movies of the year". It was directed by Tommy Haines and Andrew Sherburne.

== Synopsis ==
In a farmhouse basement on the Iowa countryside, eccentric collector Mike Zahs makes a remarkable discovery: the showreels of the man who brought moving pictures to America's Heartland. Among the treasures are a rare footage of President Teddy Roosevelt, the first moving images from Burma, and a lost relic from magical effects godfather Georges Méliés. These are the films that introduced movies to the world. The old nitrate reels are just some of the artifacts that belonged to William Franklin Brinton. From thousands of trinkets, handwritten journals, receipts, posters and catalogs emerges the story of an inventive farmboy who became a barnstorming movieman. As Mike uncovers this hidden legacy, he begins a journey to restore the Brinton name that leads to The Library of Congress, Paris and back for a big screen extravaganza in the same small-town movie theater where Brinton first turned on a projector over a century ago. The State Theatre in Washington, Iowa, USA, which opened on 14 May 1897 is the world's oldest continuously operating cinema theatre.

== Reception ==
Wesley Morris, critic-at-large for The New York Times, calls the film "celebratory... poignant" and that "the average documentary would gawk. This one reclassifies" Pamela Hutchinson of The Guardian depicts the film as an "absorbing, heartwarming tale" and that "there’s genuine warmth to the documentary." Kenneth Turan of the Los Angeles Times praises the film as "endearing, affectionate" and that "zealots are plentiful in the film history world, but ones as amiable as Zahs are as rare as the movies he doggedly preserved." The Washington Post film critic Ann Hornaday describes the film as "an audience favorite at AFI Docs" and as "a revelatory homage not just to film as a constantly evolving art form, but also as a fulcrum for community."

== See also ==
- Brinton Collection
