= Charles Keating (disambiguation) =

Charles Keating Jr. (1923–2014) was an American lawyer and banker known for the 1980s savings-and-loan scandal.

Charles Keating may also refer to:

- Charles Keating (businessman) (1933–2005), Canadian businessman
- Charles Keating (actor) (1941–2014), British actor
- Charles Keating III (born 1955), American swimmer, and son and colleague of C. K. Jr.
- Charles Keating IV (1985–2016), Navy SEAL sniper and Navy Cross recipient
- Charlie Keating, a character on the British TV series EastEnders
