= Robert Wurzelbacher =

American businessman (born 1954)

- Born: Robert M. Wurzelbacher Jr. 1954 (age 71–72)
- Education: Boston College
- Occupation: Businessman

Robert M. Wurzelbacher Jr. (born 1954) is an American businessman. He served as the senior vice president of American Continental Corporation. He graduated from Boston College. He pleaded guilty to three federal fraud counts in connection with the collapse of the Lincoln Savings and Loan Association and agreed to testify against his father-in-law Charles H. Keating Jr.
