= Wurzelbacher =

Wurzelbacher is a surname. Notable people with the surname include:

- Samuel Joseph Wurzelbacher (1973–2023), also known as "Joe the Plumber", American conservative activist and commentator
- Robert Wurzelbacher (born 1954), American businessman
