= Charles Keating IV =

Navy SEAL sniper and Navy Cross recipient

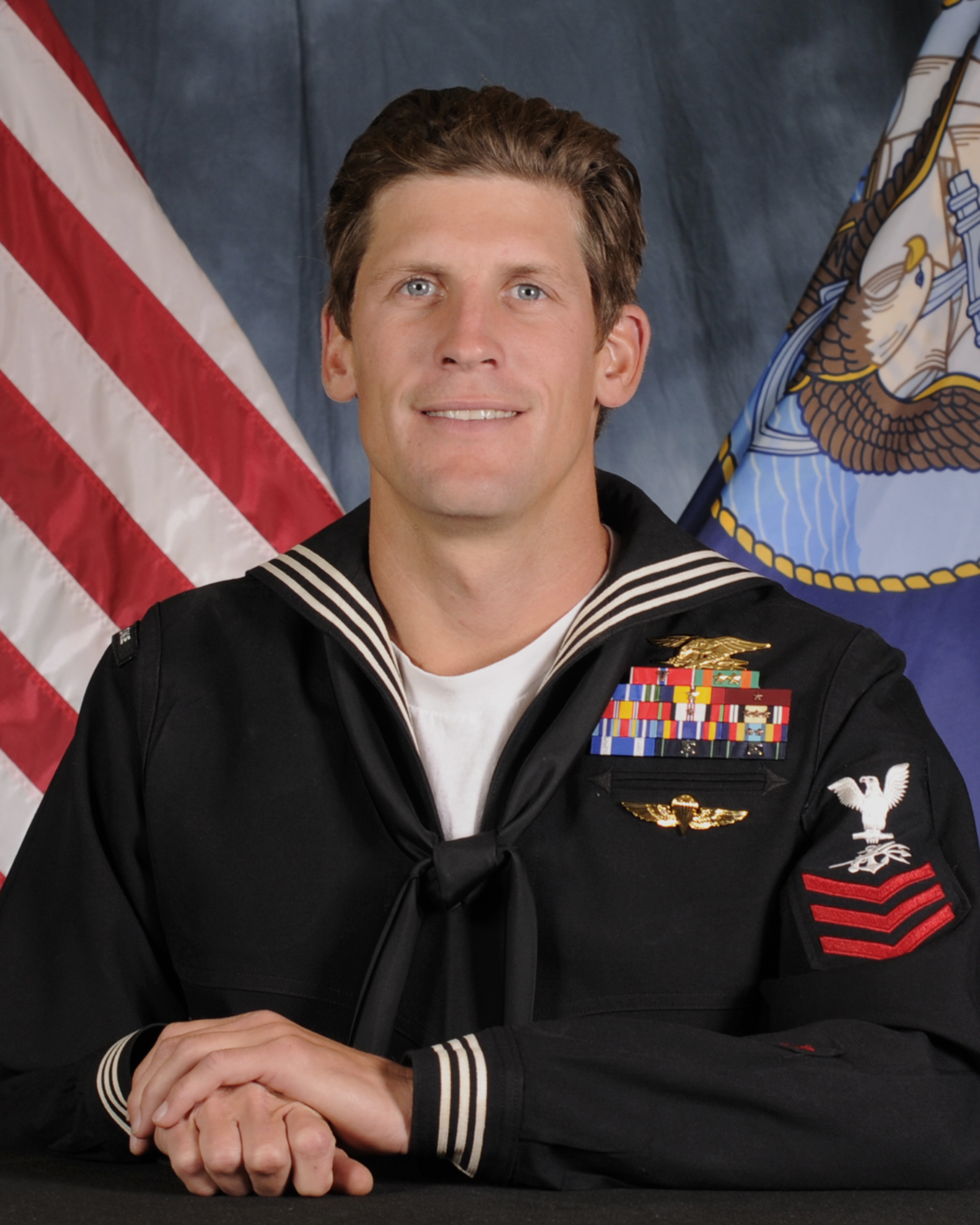
- Keating when he was a Special Warfare Operator, 1st Class
- Born: February 26, 1985; Phoenix, Arizona
- Died: May 3, 2016 (aged 31); Tesqopa, Iraq
- Burial place: Fort Rosecrans National Cemetery
- Spouse: Brooke Clark
- Relatives: Charles H. Keating Jr. (grandfather); William J. Keating (great-uncle); Gary Hall Sr. (uncle); Charles H. Keating III (father); Gary Hall Jr. (cousin)
- Military career
- Allegiance: United States of America
- Branch: United States Navy
- Service years: 2007–2016
- Rank: Chief Petty Officer (Rating: Special Warfare Operator)
- Nicknames: "Charlie"; "Chuck"; "Chuck Heavy"; "C-4"
- Units: United States Navy SEALs; SEAL Team 3; SEAL Team 1
- Conflicts: Iraq War (2003-2010); War in Afghanistan (2001–2021); War in Iraq (2013–2017); Operation Inherent Resolve †
- Awards: Navy Cross; Bronze Star
- Website: c4foundation.org

Charles Humphrey Keating IV (February 26, 1985 – May 3, 2016) was a United States Navy SEAL sniper who was killed in action against ISIS forces north of Mosul, Iraq, in 2016. He was posthumously awarded the Silver Star, which was later upgraded to the Navy Cross. Keating was the third U.S. military servicemember to be killed in action in Iraq during Operation Inherent Resolve.

Keating—whose father and grandfather were convicted for their actions in the savings and loan crisis in the late 1980s—competed in track and field during high school and college but left a promising career to become a Navy SEAL; he was one of the best runners in his BUD/S class. He later trained to be a sniper and deployed three times to Iraq and once to Afghanistan.

Keating was awarded the Bronze Star Medal with "V" device for saving an Arabic interpreter in combat and the U.S. military's second-highest award for combat valor, the Navy Cross, for his actions in combat against more than 100 ISIS fighters; he exposed himself to enemy fire multiple times and led partner forces to repel an attack. He continued to train partner forces in the region until he was killed in combat during a separate engagement two months later. After his death, his family helped start the C4 Foundation, which helps Navy SEALs and their families recover from stress.

== Early life ==
Keating was born on February 26, 1985, in Phoenix, Arizona, and was one of six children of Charles Keating III. Despite a long family history of competitive swimming, he chose to run track and became captain of the track team his last two years at Arcadia High School. During his last three years at Arcadia High, Keating was the champion in the 1,600-meter run and also earned city and state honors as a senior.

Keating is the grandson of banker Charles Keating Jr., whose Lincoln Savings and Loan Association failed and cost the U.S. government $3 billion during the savings and loan crisis. The Keating Five scandal took place when five U.S. senators were accused of improperly interfering on Keating Jr.'s behalf; Keating Jr. was later convicted of fraud, racketeering and conspiracy, for which he spent four and half years in prison. Keating III was convicted as a co-conspirator with the elder Keating on fraud and conspiracy charges but remained free on bail and ultimately had charges dropped. Other students at school made fun of Charles Keating IV for his family's past, but he stated that he did not care about the scandal.

In February 2001, Keating appeared on the Discovery Kids program Outward Bound. The show followed Keating and 7 other teens for three weeks facing the challenges of traveling through a rain forest in Costa Rica. The group paddled about 40 miles a day, rappelled down canyon walls, slept under makeshift tents, helped out local villages and lived only on rice, beans and eggs. Keating also celebrated his 16th birthday during the filming of the show.

He graduated from Arcadia High in 2004 and went on to major in business at Indiana University Bloomington, where his father and uncle had also attended, on a track scholarship. Navy SEAL astronaut William Shepherd also graduated from Arcadia High and was assigned to SEAL Team 1, to which Keating would later be assigned. While at Indiana, he won one of the indoor open mile events with a time of 4:16. Even though Keating had a very promising track and field career, he left college after two years to become a Navy SEAL, which was something he had wanted to do since a young age.

== Military career ==
In addition to having a family history in competitive sports, Keating also had some military service family history. His great-grandfather had served during World War I, his grandfather was a naval aviator during World War II, his great-uncle served in the Navy during World War II, and his younger brother Billy also became an enlisted SEAL. Keating followed in his grandfather's and his great uncle's footsteps by enlisting in the Navy in February 2007 and graduated Basic Underwater Demolition-SEAL training with class 266 in June 2008. He was one of only 14 graduates out of a total of 300 candidates that started his BUD/S class. During BUD/S, he drew attention to himself by having impressive run times. After graduating BUD/S, Keating completed parachute jump school and SEAL Qualification Training (SQT) and was assigned to SEAL Team 3, where he trained to be a lead breacher and sniper. While there, Keating became good friends with fellow SEAL Eli Crane. Crane was later selected to be one of three SEALs that would notify Keating's family in case of his death.

While assigned to SEAL Team 3, Keating completed two deployments to Iraq in 2008 and 2010 and one to Afghanistan in 2012. In July 2013, he was assigned to Naval Special Warfare Training Detachment One, where he became responsible for training all West Coast-based snipers as a Sniper/Reconnaissance Cell Leading Petty Officer. In February 2015, Keating became a platoon leading petty officer at SEAL Team 1 and later deployed in support of Operation Inherent Resolve in Iraq as a Senior Enlisted Advisor.

According to teammates, Keating repeatedly put his own life in danger in combat to protect others. During one deployment, he was awarded the Bronze Star Medal with "V" device for saving an Arabic interpreter in combat. Before his fourth deployment, he secretly married his fiancée, Brooke Clark. They were planning to marry that November, but Keating wanted to protect her in case anything happened to him.

=== Death ===
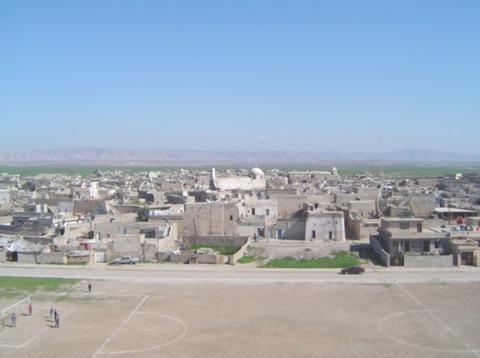
The village of Tesqopa, Iraq

On May 3, 2016, Keating was part of a Quick Reaction Force (QRF) that was on standby to help Kurdish Peshmerga forces and a small U.S. advise-and-assist SEAL team if they came under attack. The U.S. advise-and-assist team consisted of less than a dozen U.S. troops and were about two miles from the front lines near the town of Tesqopa. The advise-and-assist team and U.S. surveillance were both unaware that a surprise attack by about 125 ISIS fighters, about 20 technical vehicles and at least one bulldozer were heading their way. ISIS fighters broke through Peshmerga front lines around 7:30 a.m., and about 20 minutes later, the U.S. team was engaged in combat. The team then requested their Quick Reaction Force around this time.

The QRF arrived, and the firefight continued for about two more hours. Keating went to retrieve his .300 Winchester Magnum sniper rifle from a coalition vehicle nearby and then went up to a rooftop to reengage the enemy. Around 9:32 a.m., he was hit by direct enemy fire. His SEAL teammates got him off the roof and he was evacuated to a hospital in Erbil within the hour, but his wound was fatal. No other U.S. or coalition forces were wounded; however, both aeromedical evacuation helicopters were hit by enemy small arms fire. Early reports claimed that Keating was hit by enemy sniper fire, but this has not been confirmed.

The battle continued long after U.S. forces were extracted; eventually, air assets arrived. Coalition air forces attacked with F-15s, F-16s, B-52s, A-10s and two drones. There were 31 air strikes by manned aircraft and two by drone. Coalition air forces destroyed about 20 vehicles, two truck bombs, three mortars, and one bulldozer and eliminated 58 ISIS fighters. The battle lasted about 14 hours, ending around 9:30 p.m.; after, the Peshmerga regained control of Tesqopa. The battle was the heaviest fighting between coalition forces and ISIS since around December of the year before, and there were an unknown number of Peshmerga casualties.

Keating was the third U.S. military servicemember to be killed in action in Iraq during Operation Inherent Resolve.

=== Navy Cross ===
On May 10, Keating was posthumously awarded the Silver Star—later upgraded to a Navy Cross—by Secretary of the Navy Ray Mabus. He was also awarded a Purple Heart for his death on May 3.

=== Navy Cross Citation ===
The Navy Cross Medal

AWARDED FOR ACTIONS DURING: Global War on Terror

SERVICE: United States Navy

PLACE AND DATE: Iraq, March 4 - May 3, 2016

CITATION: The President of the United States of America takes pride in presenting the Navy Cross (Posthumously) to Chief Petty Officer (SEAL) Charles Humphrey Keating, IV, United States Navy, for conspicuous gallantry and intrepidity in action on 4 March 2016, while serving as Senior Enlisted Advisor, Trident 1125A, SEAL Team 1 in support of Operation INHERENT RESOLVE. Chief Petty Officer Keating's courageous leadership, tactical acumen, and physical courage were the key factors in defeating an assault on friendly lines by more than 100 enemy fighters. After directing partner nation troops in repelling the enemy's initial incursion, he coordinated with the immediate reaction force and continued engaging enemy fighters. He continually exposed himself to enemy automatic weapon, mortar, and rocket propelled grenade fire as he diligently maneuvered between the front and flanks of the defensive fighting position to stop enemy advances and keep friendly forces accurately informed of the unfolding situation. When the enemy attempted to flank his position with a vehicle-borne improvised explosive device, Chief Petty Officer Keating led a team to intercept and neutralize the threat with precise sniper and rocket fire. His personal bravery inspired his comrades to vigorously defend their position and repel the enemy assault. He continued to train partner forces until mortally wounded by enemy fire during a combat engagement on 3 May 2016. By his bold initiative, undaunted courage, and complete dedication to duty, Chief Petty Officer Keating reflected great credit upon himself and upheld the highest traditions of the United States Naval Service.

=== Reaction ===
The governor of Arizona, Doug Ducey, said in a statement regarding Keating, "Our state and nation are in mourning today over the loss of a U.S. serviceman — and one of America's finest." Ducey also ordered all flags in Arizona to be flown at half-staff on May 4. John McCain, Meghan McCain and Navy Lt. Jack McCain all gave the Keating family their sympathy. John McCain had known the Keating family for many years and made a statement on Keating's death: "Like so many brave Americans who came before him, Charlie sacrificed his life in honorable service to our nation for a cause greater than self-interest, which we can never truly repay." Defense Secretary Ash Carter acknowledged Keating's actions and called him a hero.

=== Funeral and remembrance ===
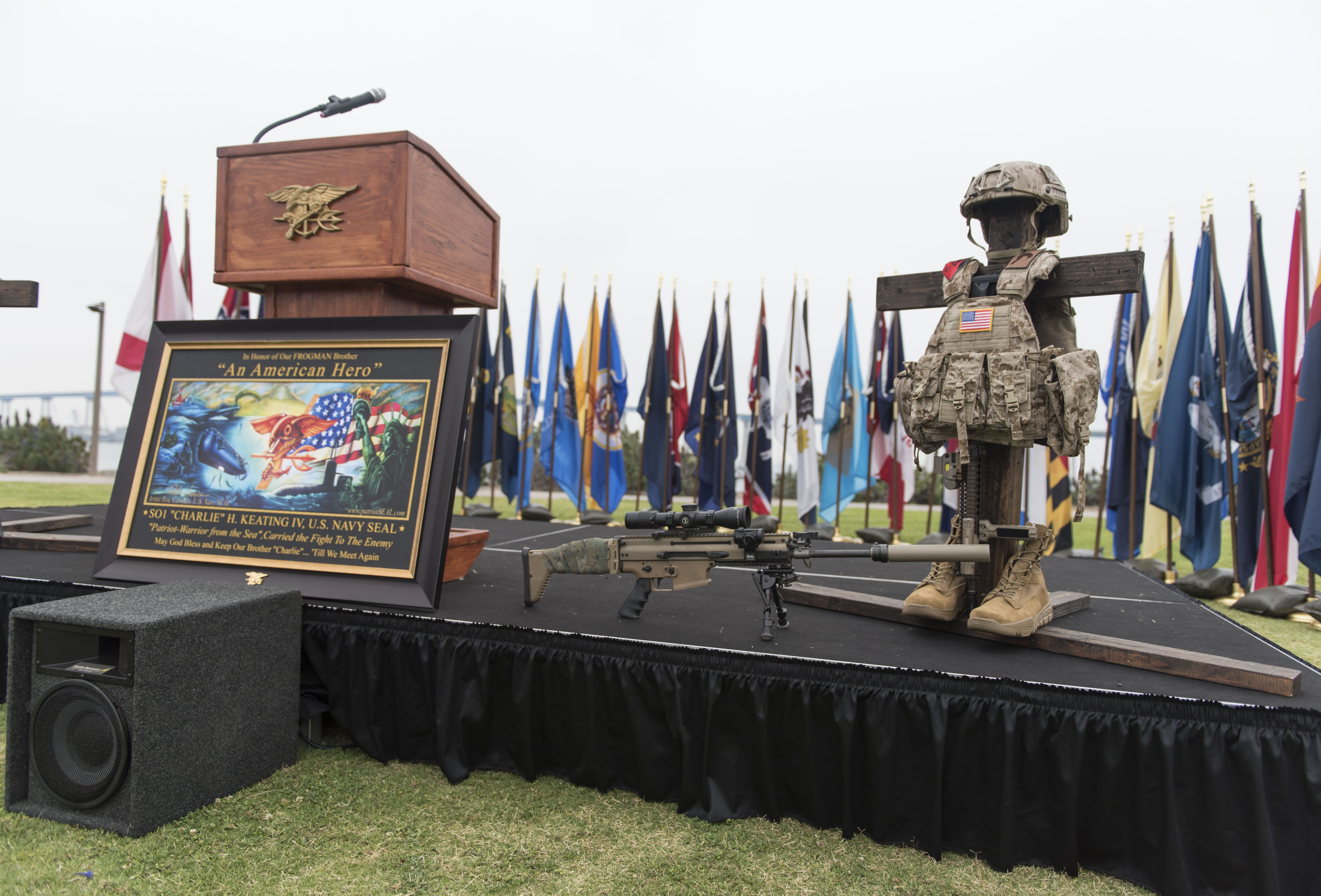
A memorial for Keating at Tidelands Park in Coronado, California. Some of his combat gear is shown including his FN SCAR 17 and MK-18 rifles.

Keating's remains were flown to Dover Air Force Base, and his family was present for a private transfer-of-remains ceremony before his remains were sent to San Diego for his funeral. On May 12, 2016, over 1,000 people came to Keating's public memorial ceremony at Tidelands Park in Coronado, California. The city invited the public to line the streets during the funeral procession which went through Coronado the next day and ended at Fort Rosecrans National Cemetery where Keating was buried. Before his funeral, Keating was posthumously promoted to chief petty officer, since he had passed the tests to do so before his final deployment. A Mass was also held for Keating by Cardinal Timothy M. Dolan at St. Patrick's Cathedral in New York City. President Barack Obama mentioned Keating in a speech on Memorial Day at Arlington National Cemetery: "One of Keating's platoon mates sent his parents a letter from Iraq: 'Please tell everyone Chuck saved a lot of lives today,' it said. He left us, 'with that big signature smile on his handsome face, as always. Chuck was full of aloha, but was also a ferocious warrior.'"

On January 13, 2017, Secretary of the Navy Ray Mabus awarded 8 Silver Stars and 8 Navy Crosses to current, former and deceased members of Naval Special Warfare during a medal upgrade ceremony at Virginia Beach, Virginia. Keating's Silver Star was upgraded to the Navy Cross and was presented to his family. The medal upgrades were a result of a branchwide review of over 300 valor medals awarded for actions in Afghanistan and Iraq.

The C4 Foundation was founded in 2019 and is named after Keating. The foundation owns and operates a 560-acre (230 ha) ranch located 45 miles (72 km) east of San Diego in the Mesa Grande area. The foundation and ranch are dedicated to helping SEALs recover from their high stress jobs. Charles Keating III currently serves as the foundation's president and Brooke Clark (Keating's widow) is formerly the vice president. Navy SEAL Medal of Honor recipients Edward Byers and Britt K. Slabinski serve on the board of directors and the advisory board respectively. Scott P. Moore and Keating's brother William are also on the advisory board. Professional skateboarder Rodney Mullen serves on the scientific advisory board. In a series of social media posts on Memorial Day 2019, former Navy SEAL Dan Crenshaw honored several fallen special operations members including Keating.

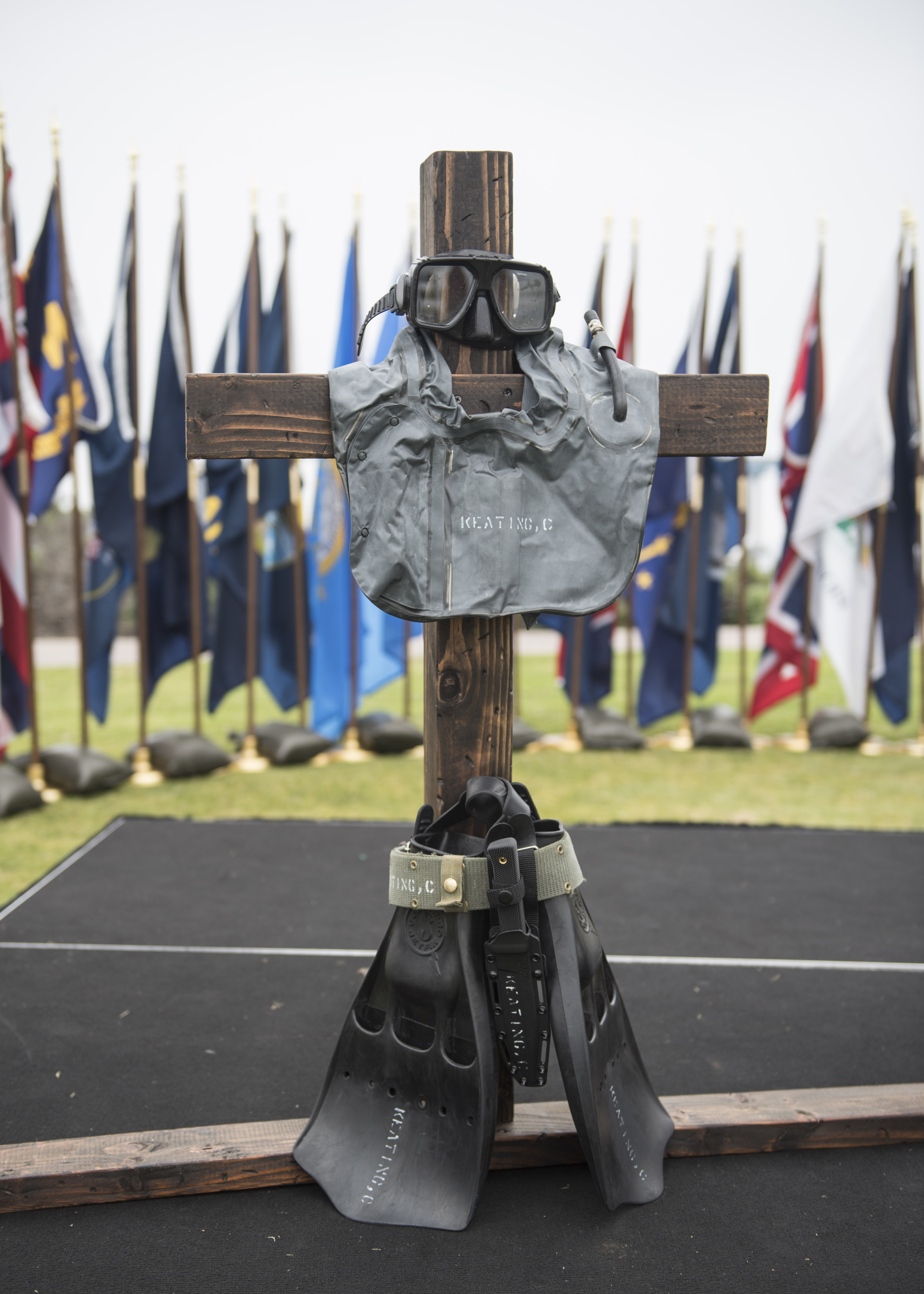
A Battlefield cross with some of Keating's diving gear.

== Awards and decorations ==
Chief Petty Officer Keating received the following awards:

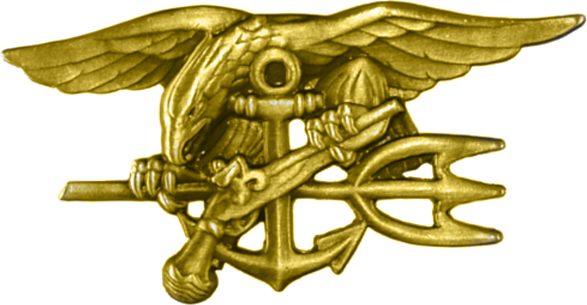

Badge	Special Warfare insignia		
1st Row	Navy Cross		
2nd Row	Bronze Star with "V" device	Purple Heart	Navy and Marine Corps Achievement Medal with 2 Gold 5/16-inch stars
3rd Row	Army Achievement Medal	Combat Action Ribbon with 1 Gold 5/16-inch star	Navy Good Conduct Medal with 1 Bronze 3/16-inch star
4th Row	National Defense Service Medal	Afghanistan Campaign Medal with 1 Bronze 3/16-inch star	Iraq Campaign Medal with 3 Bronze 3/16-inch stars
5th Row	Global War on Terrorism Expeditionary Medal	Global War on Terrorism Service Medal	Sea Service Ribbon with 2 Bronze 3/16-inch stars
6th Row	NATO Medal	Navy Rifle Marksmanship Medal with expert device	Navy Pistol Marksmanship Medal with expert device
Badge	Navy and Marine Corps Parachutist Insignia		

== Gallery ==
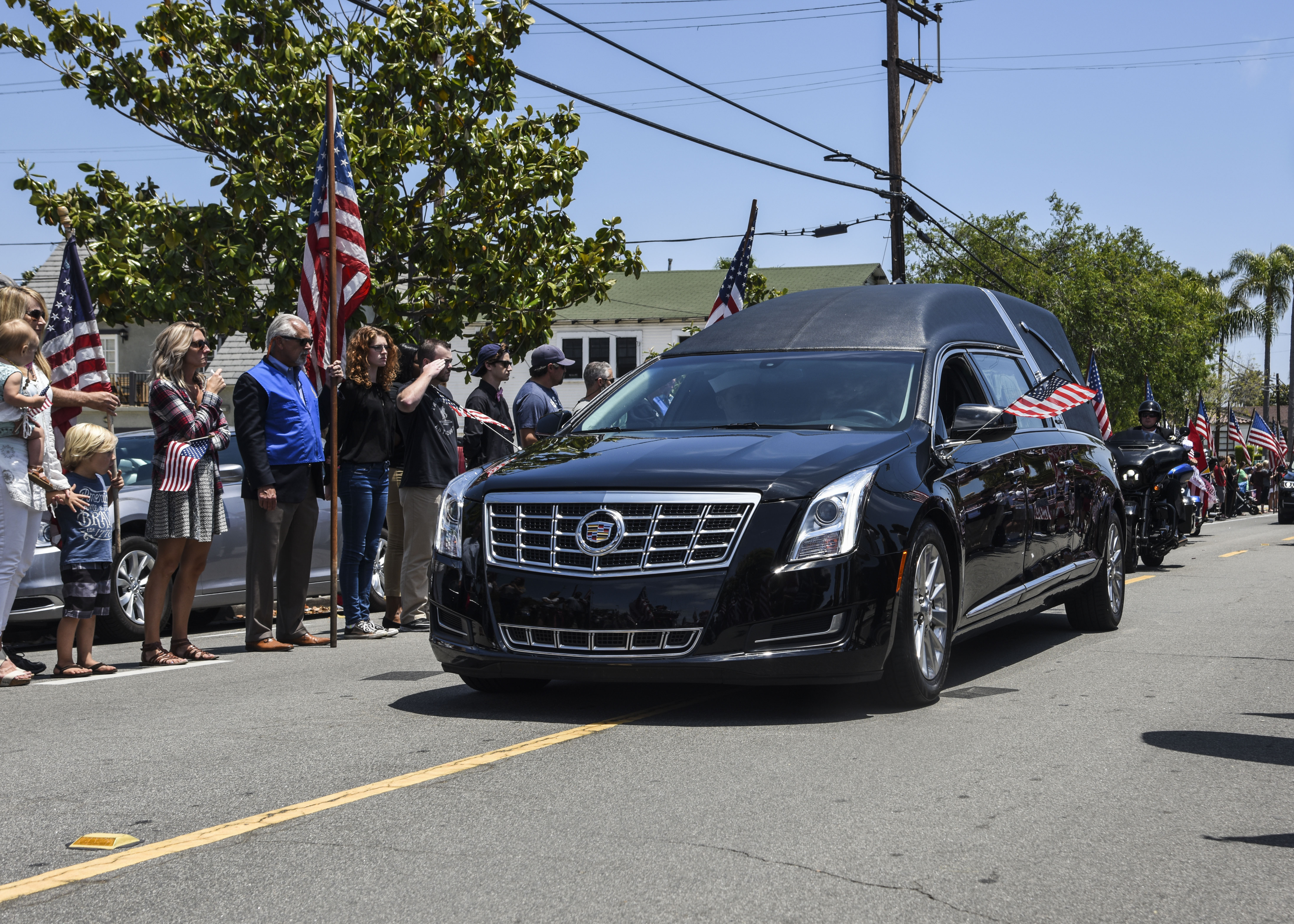
Keating's funeral procession travels along Sixth Avenue in Coronado, California, on its way to Fort Rosecrans National Cemetery.

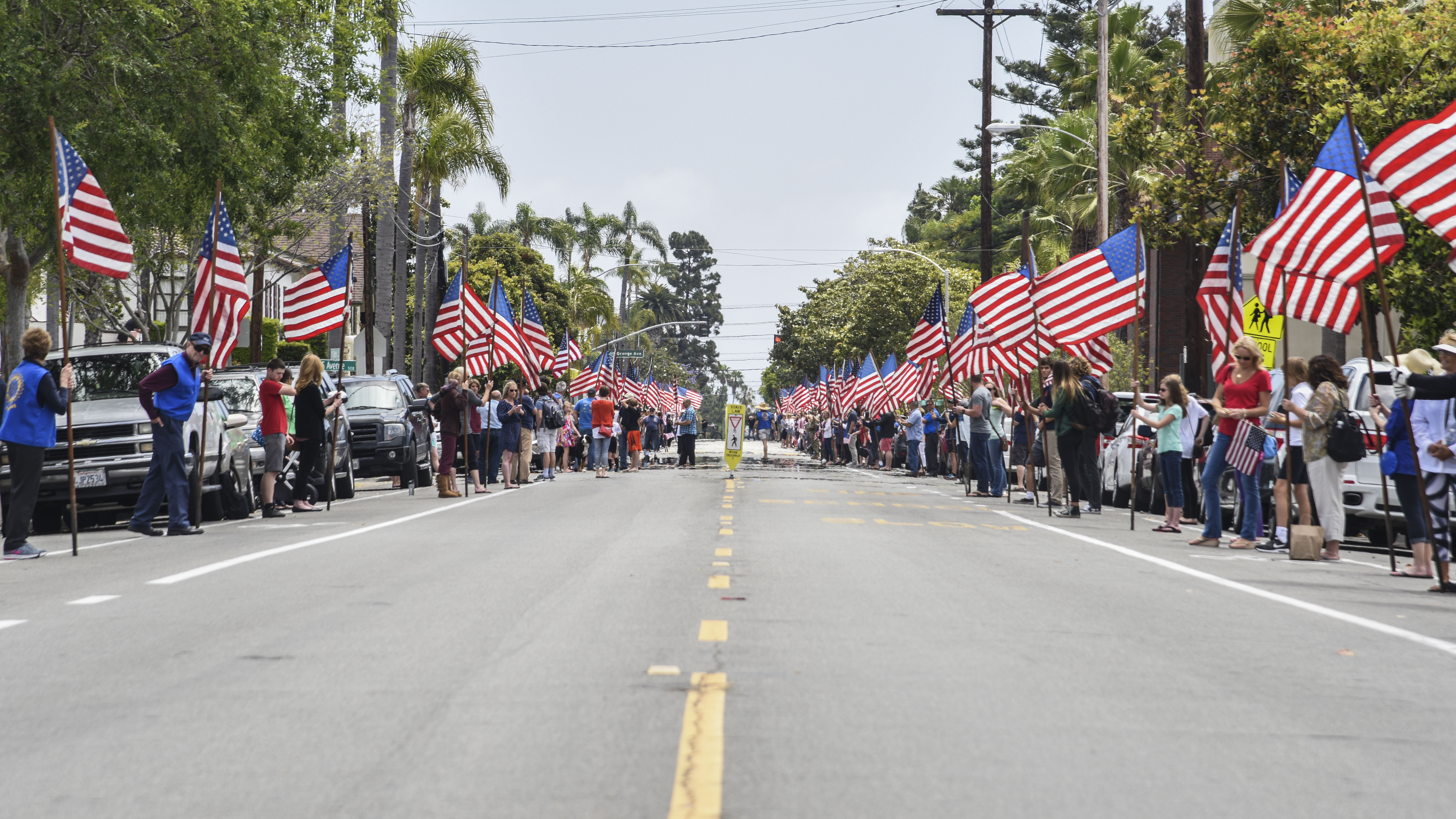
Citizens of San Diego honoring Keating.

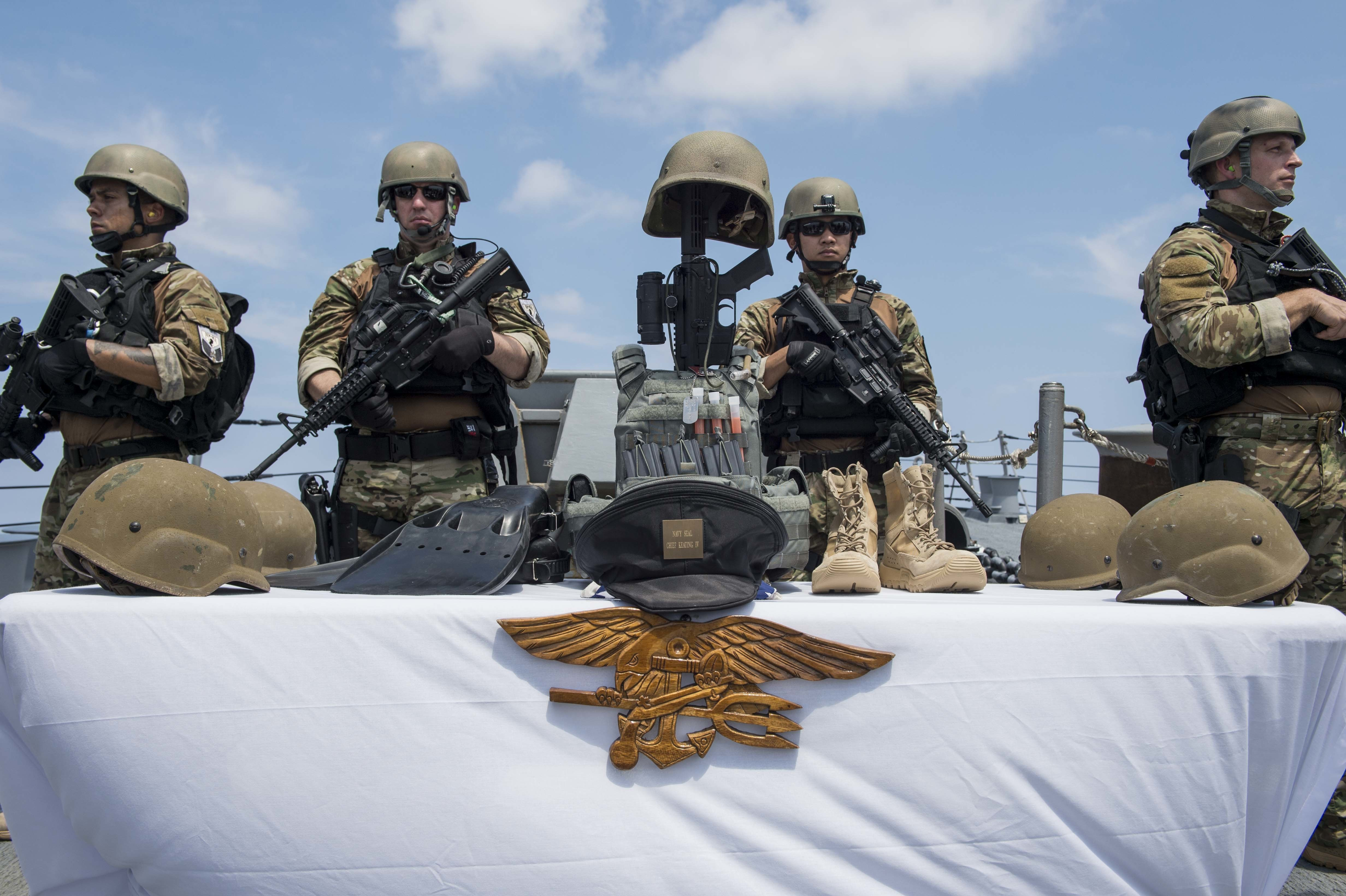
Visit, board, search, and seizure (VBSS) sailors assemble around a memorial to Keating during the Memorial Day ceremony aboard the Arleigh Burke-class destroyer USS William P. Lawrence.

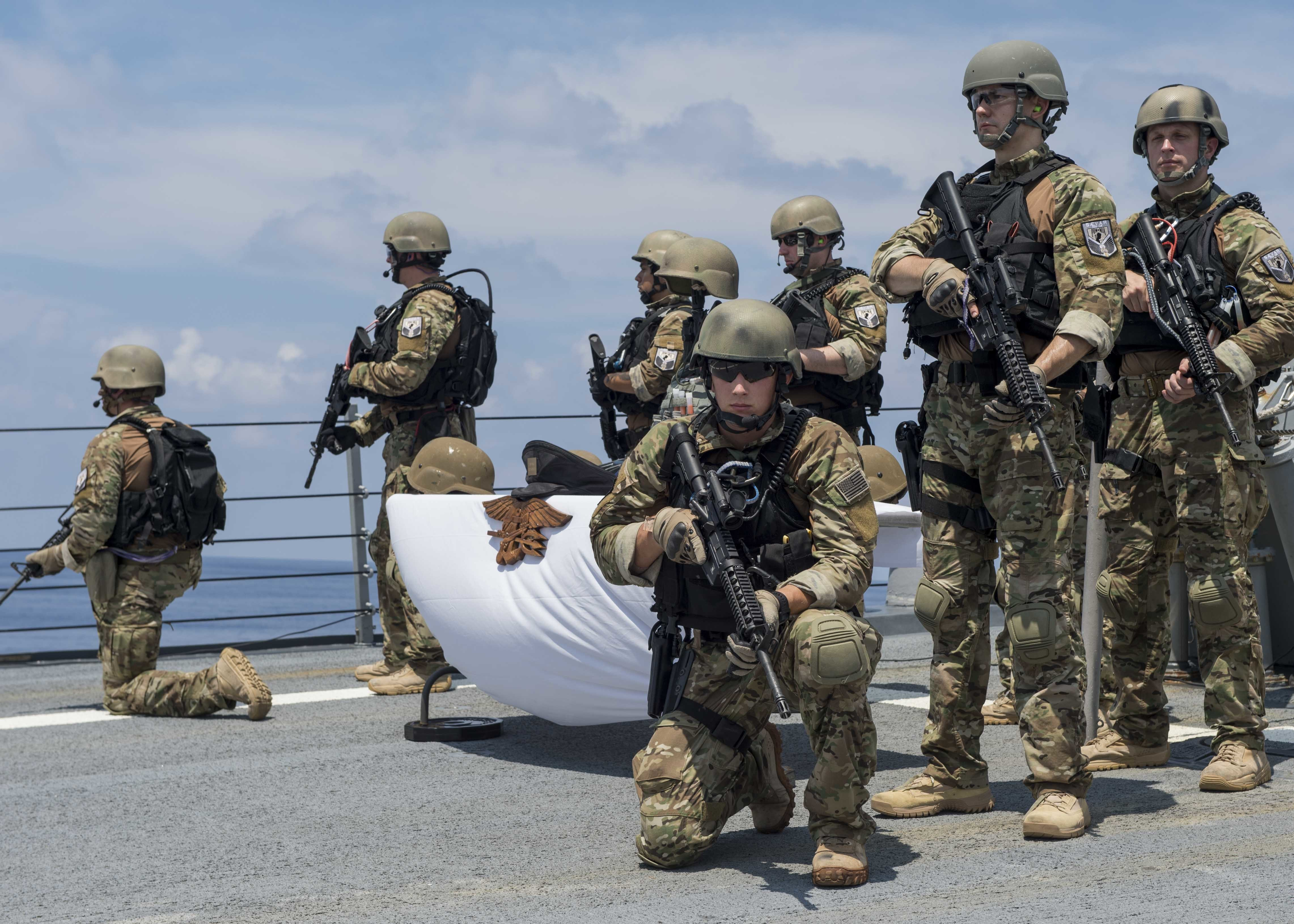
The VBSS team around the memorial.

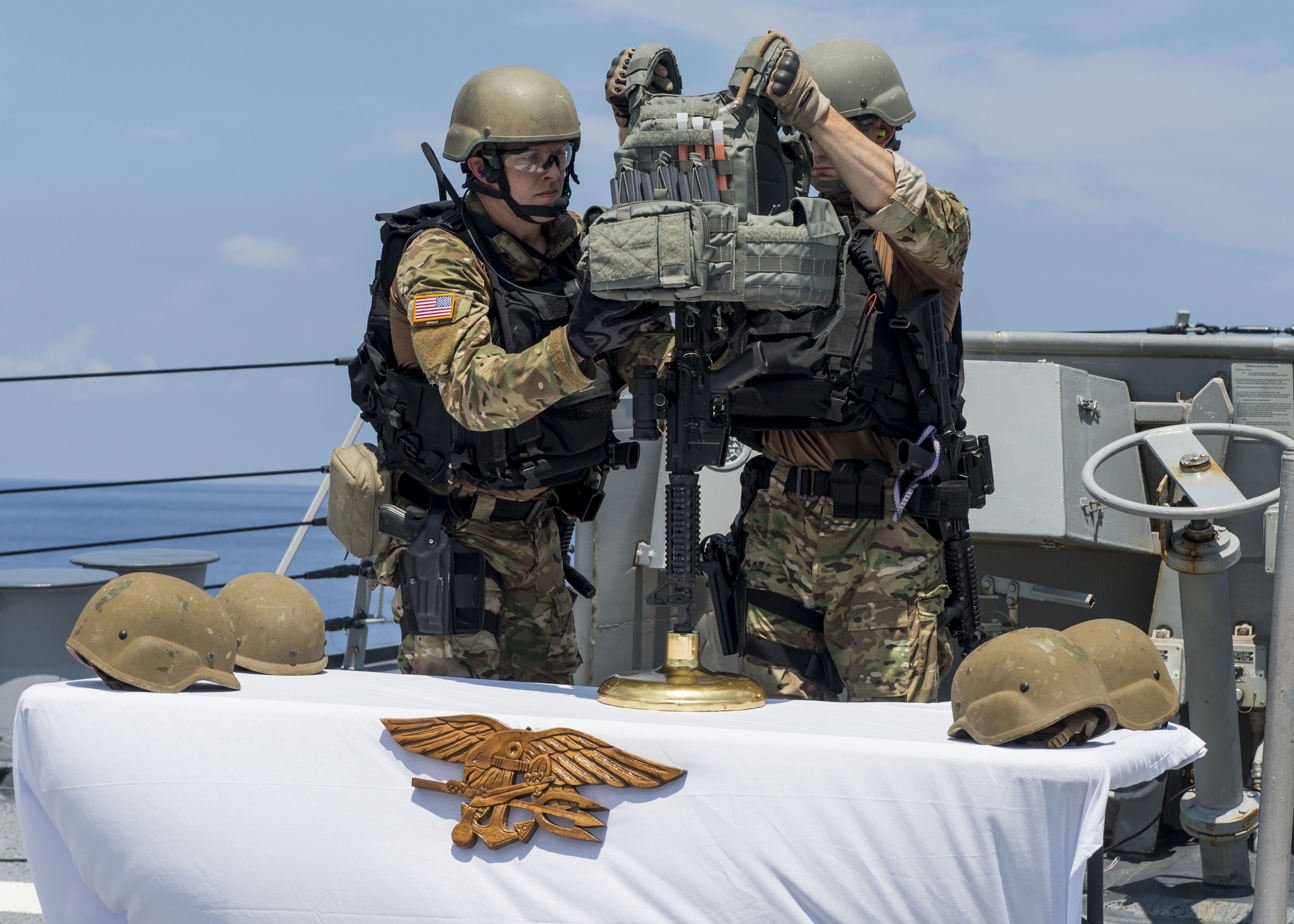
The VBSS team setting up the memorial.

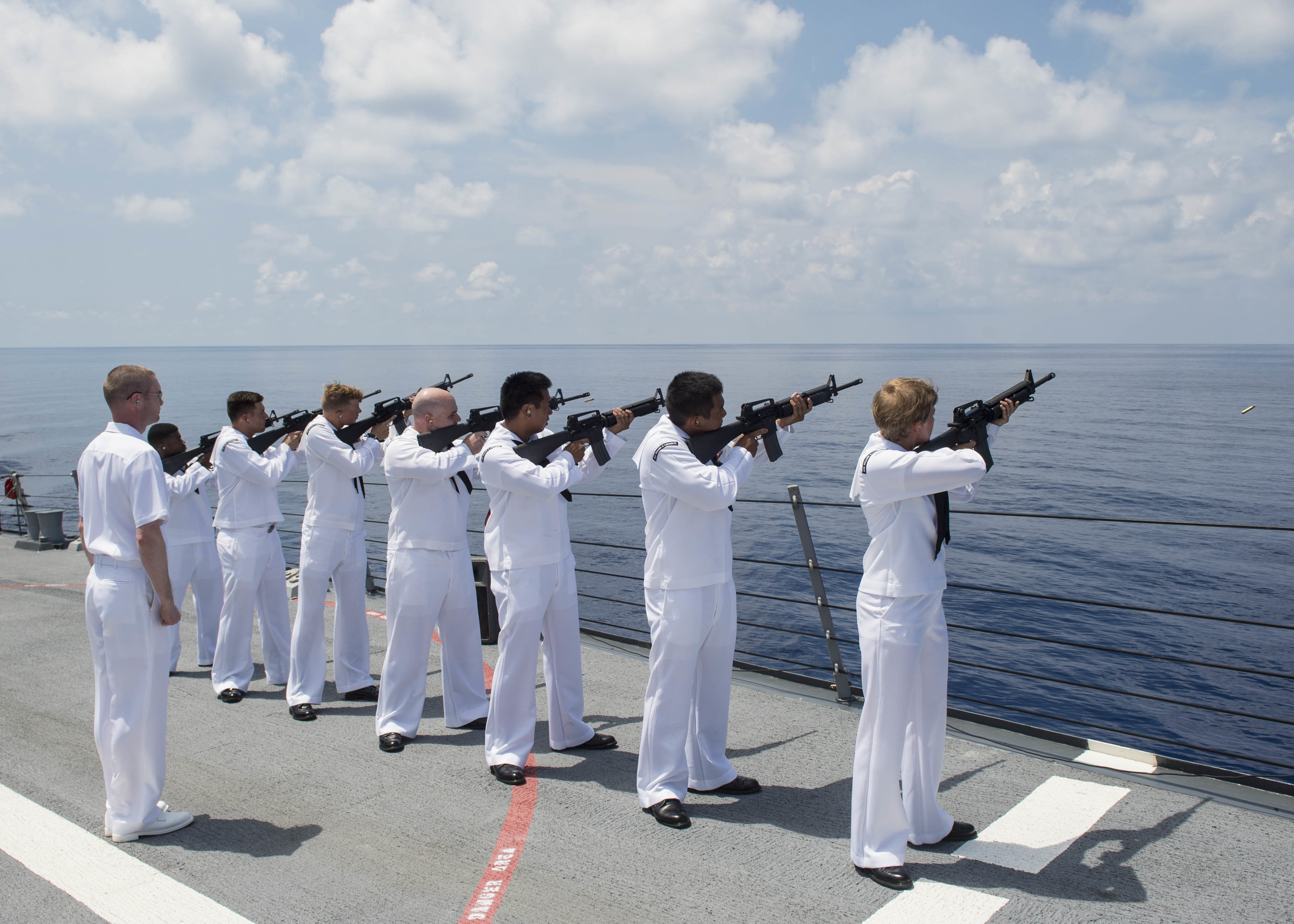
Sailors aboard the USS William P. Lawrence perform a Three-volley salute during a Memorial Day ceremony in honor of Keating.

== See also ==
- List of United States Navy SEALs
