= Perversion for Profit =

1963 film

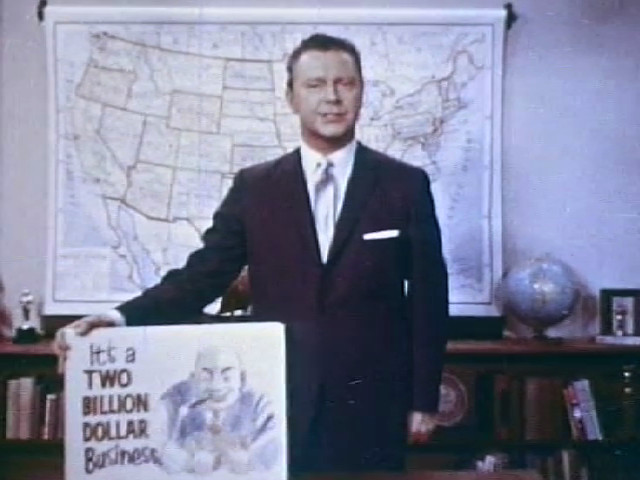
- George Putnam in Perversion for Profit
- Produced by: Charles Keating
- Starring: George Putnam
- Narrated by: George Putnam
- Distributed by: Citizens for Decent Literature, Inc.
- Release date: 1963
- Running time: 31 minutes
- Country: United States
- Language: English

Perversion for Profit part 1

Perversion for Profit part 2

Perversion for Profit is a 1963 Eastmancolor propaganda film financed by Charles Keating through Citizens for Decent Literature and narrated by news reporter George Putnam. The film's argument is that sexually explicit materials corrupt young viewers and readers, leading to acts of violence and "perverted" attitudes towards sexuality –homosexuality included. Although Perversion for Profit was serious in its suggestion that pornography could erode the integrity of American culture, Peter L. Stein of the San Francisco Chronicle wrote in a 2003 review that it was "shrill and sometimes comical".

Today, Perversion for Profit is in the public domain, and it has become popular on the Prelinger Archives website and on YouTube. As Peter L. Stein observes in an article for the San Francisco Chronicle, however, the film also has considerable historical significance, serving as a sort of time capsule of pornography from the era as well as an example of historical concerns regarding media influence:

... as the parade of girlie magazine covers, men's physique pictorials and campy S&M leaflets continues, the film betrays a kind of prurience the filmmakers could hardly have intended. What results is a remarkable visual record of midcentury underground literature and sexual appetites, and a gloss on the values of the society that condemned them.

At the time the Chronicle article was written, Perversion was the Prelinger Archive's second most popular download, superseded only by the well-known Cold War film Duck and Cover. Like Stein, ephemeral film scholar Rick Prelinger, founder of the Archive, views such films as illuminating historical documents or what he calls "unofficial evidence of everyday life".

== Summary ==
In 1963, Putnam narrated Perversion for Profit, in which he warned viewers about magazines containing nudity and homosexual material, saying gay people were "perverted" and "misfits", as well as implying that they were child molesters (and furthermore that they weakened U.S. "resistance to the Communist masters of deceit"). The film was financed by Charles Keating.

== Allusions ==
Putnam erroneously cites the Supreme Court as having declared adult publications, "Dirt for dirt's sake." In actuality, that quote was from New York Court of Appeals judge John F. Scileppi and was in reference to Henry Miller's Tropic of Cancer (1961).

To support his position, Putnam refers to "Dr. [Pitirim] Sorokin, the renowned Harvard sociologist," a Russian-American who founded Harvard's Sociology department and served as the American Sociological Association's 55th president.

To exemplify corrupting literature, Putnam reads a passage from the pulp fiction novel Sex Jungle (1960) by Don Elliot, a pseudonym for novelist Robert Silverberg. In a 2000 interview, Silverberg explained that the erotic fiction that he published under the Don Elliot pseudonym ...

... was undertaken at a time when I was saddled with a huge debt, at the age of 26, for a splendid house that I had bought. There would have been no way to pay the house off by writing science fiction in that long-ago era, when $2500 was a lot to earn from a novel that might take months to write, so I turned out a slew of quick sex novels. I never concealed the fact that I was doing them; it made no difference at all to me whether people knew or not. It was just a job. And it was, incidentally, a job that I did very well. I think they were outstanding erotic novels.

== Broadcast ==
Turner Classic Movies has televised the film Saturday nights on its TCM Underground block.

== See also ==
- List of American films of 1963
- Censorship in the United States
- Boys Beware
- Dating Do's and Don'ts
- Freedom of speech in the United States
- Fuck
- Lavender scare
- List of films in the public domain in the United States
- Reefer Madness
- Sex education
- Sexual morality
- Sex Madness
- The Story of Menstruation
- This Film Is Not Yet Rated
