= National Organization for Decent Literature =

Defunct American moral pressure group

The National Organization for Decent Literature was an American pressure group active in campaigning for the censorship of literature. A successor organization to the National Legion of Decency, it was largely led by Roman Catholic priests. The NODL was founded in 1938, and ran until the late 1960s. It campaigned against pulp magazines, comic books and what its leaders saw as indecent literature in general.

The organization periodically published lists of "Publications Disapproved". Works on these lists were widely eschewed by booksellers and distributors. Among the disapproved works were those by respected literary figures such as James T. Farrell, William Faulkner, and Edmund Wilson.

In March 1942 it put Sensation Comics on its blacklist of Publications Disapproved for Youth for one reason: Wonder Woman was not sufficiently dressed.

== See also ==
- Citizens for Decent Literature
- Churchmen's Committee for Decent Publications
- National Legion of Decency
