= Charles Keating III =

American swimmer (born 1955)

Personal information
- Full name: Charles Humphrey Keating III
- National team: United States
- Born: August 20, 1955 (age 71) Cincinnati, Ohio, U.S.
- Height: 6 ft 1 in (1.85 m)
- Weight: 179 lb (81 kg)

Sport
- Sport: Swimming
- Strokes: Breaststroke
- Club: Gatorade Swim Club; Cincinnati Marlins
- College team: Indiana University
- Coach: Doc Counsilman (IU)

Charles Humphrey Keating III (nicknamed C3; born August 20, 1955) is an American former competitive swimmer and real estate executive. He represented the United States in swimming at the 1976 Summer Olympics in Montreal, Quebec. He was convicted of fraud in the savings and loan crisis, along with his more famous father, but the charges against him were later dismissed. His son, a Navy SEAL operator, was the third American service member to be killed while fighting ISIL in Iraq, in 2016.

== Early life and swimming ==
Charles Keating III was born to Mary Elaine (Fette) and Charles Keating, Jr. on August 20, 1955. The elder Keating had won the national college championship in the 200-yard breaststroke at the NCAA swimming and diving championships in 1946. Charles Keating III is also the brother-in-law of four-time Olympic medalist Gary Hall, Sr., and the uncle of ten-time medalist Gary Hall, Jr.

Charles Keating III qualified for Amateur Athletic Union national championships from the age of 13. At St. Xavier High School in Cincinnati, he swam for the state champion varsity team all four years. During his senior year, he won the Ohio state championship in 200 IM and 100 breaststroke.

After graduating from St. Xavier in 1973, he went on to swim for Indiana University Bloomington under legendary coach Doc Counsilman on a scholarship. He graduated in 1977.

Keating won the AAU National Championship in 1976 and represented the United States that year at the Montreal Summer Olympics. He finished fifth in the final of the men's 200-meter breaststroke. He was inducted into the St. Xavier Hall of Fame in 2006 and has also been inducted into the Indiana University Hall of Fame.

== Real estate ==
After graduation, Keating quickly rose through the ranks at his father's American Continental Corporation, becoming an executive vice president by 1986.

In 1993, Keating was convicted on 64 counts of fraud and conspiracy as a co-conspirator with his father in the collapse of American Continental and Lincoln Savings and Loan Association (see savings and loan crisis). The younger Keating was sentenced to eight years and one month in prison and $97.3 million in restitution but remained free on bail pending appeals.

In 1996, U.S. District Judge John Davies overturned their convictions, ruling that the jury in the 1993 case was prejudiced by rulings against the elder Keating at the state level. In April 1999, federal prosecutors agreed to a plea bargain with the elder Keating in which all outstanding charges were dismissed against his son.

After the scandal, Keating continued to work as a real estate developer in Phoenix.

== Charles Keating IV ==
Keating III's son, Charles Humphrey Keating IV (February 1, 1985 – May 3, 2016), graduated from Arcadia High in 2004 and went on to compete for the Cross Country team at Indiana University. After two athletic seasons, Keating IV joined the Navy SEALs (2006–2016) and trained at the Naval Amphibious Base Coronado in California. He was deployed to the American-led intervention in Iraq, supporting Iraqi Kurdistan's Peshmerga forces in an advise and assist mission in a 30-man unit.

On May 3, 2016, Keating IV, a Chief Petty Officer, was killed by small arms fire during an ISIL assault on a Peshmerga position approximately 3 to 5 kilometers behind enemy lines, near the town of Tel Asqof, 28–30 km north of Mosul. ISIL militants broke into the position using three truck bombs followed by bulldozers which cleared the wreckage away. The U.S. responded with fighter, bomber and drone, carrying out 31 airstrikes, which killed 58 IS militants and destroyed 20 vehicles, stopping the attack. Keating IV was part of a nearly 20-man QRF that was sent to rescue a dozen U.S. advisors and to assist the Peshmerga, during the battle the SEALs ran low on ammunition and Keating's machine gun malfunctioned so he went back to a nearby coalition vehicle to get a new weapon and additional ammunition. Keating, now armed with a sniper rifle, climbed on top of a building and began firing on the ISIS fighters. It was at this point that Keating was struck by enemy fire. He was medevaced to a hospital where he was declared dead. Arizona governor Doug Ducey ordered state flags be flown at half mast on May 4. He was posthumously awarded the Silver Star for his actions in a battle against about 100 ISIS fighters on March 4, 2016, in Syria. The award was later upgraded to a Navy Cross, the US military's second highest award for valor. He was the third American service member to be killed while fighting ISIL in Iraq, in 2016.

== See also ==
- Joshua Wheeler
- List of Indiana University (Bloomington) people
