= Citizens for Decent Literature =

Pro-censorship advocacy body in Ohio, U.S.

Citizens for Decent Literature was a pro-censorship advocacy body founded in 1956 in Cincinnati, Ohio by the Roman Catholic anti-pornography campaigner Charles Keating which advocated reading classics, not "smut". Many priests were also involved in this organization.

It was later renamed a number of times to various names, the best known of which was Citizens for Decency through Law.

It would grow to 300 chapters and 100,000 members nationwide and become the largest anti-pornography organization in the nation. Over the following 20 years the organization mailed some 40 million letters on behalf of its position and had filed amicus curiae briefs. The organization was one of three national groups involved in the 1980s anti-pornography efforts which resulted in the Meese Report.

Under the name Citizens for Decency through Law, the CDL was still active as of 2002, although it did not have a website.

== See also ==
- Churchmen's Committee for Decent Publications
- National Legion of Decency
- National Organization for Decent Literature
