= William J. Keating =

American lawyer, businessman, and politician (1927–2020)

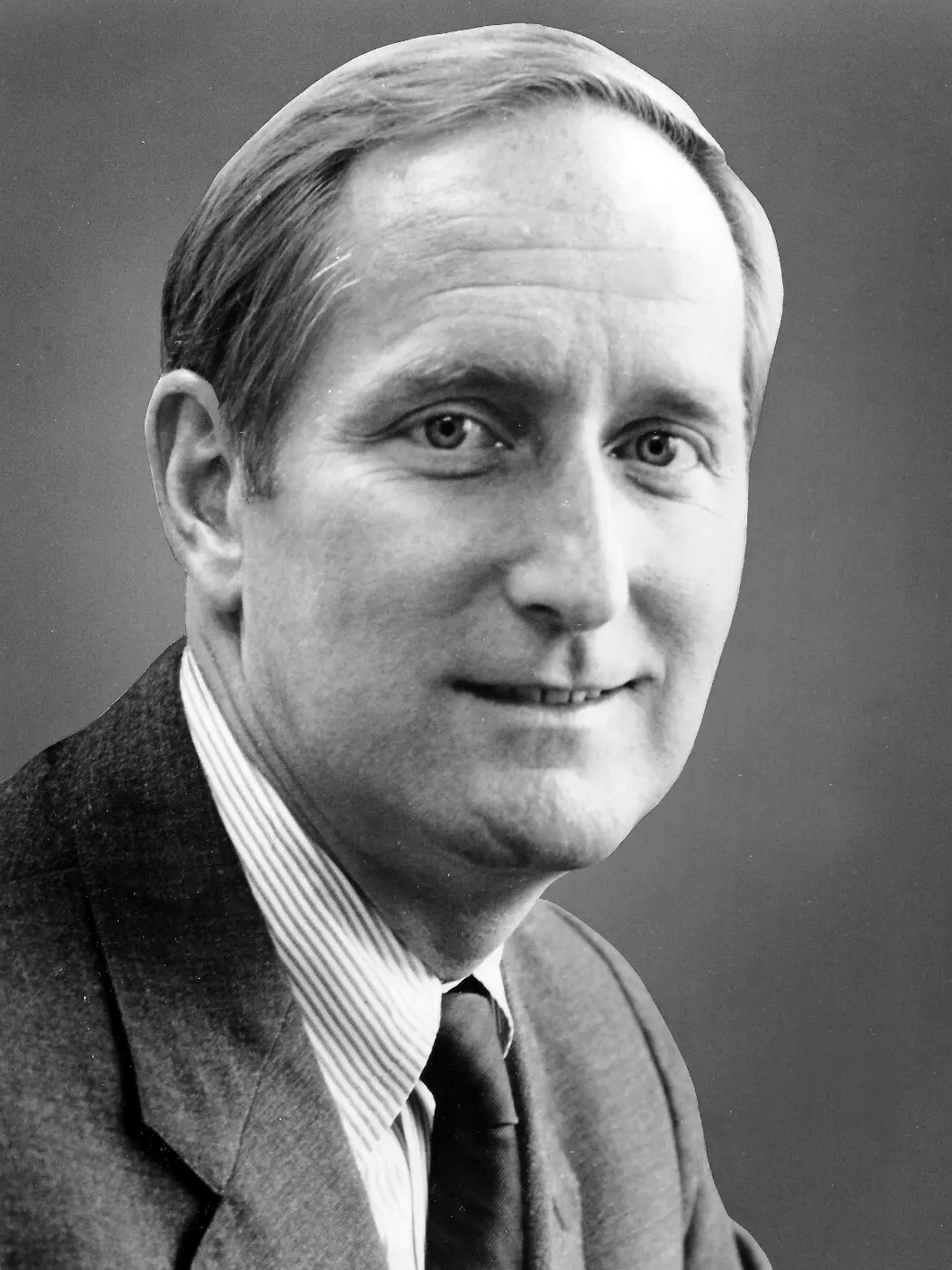

Member of the U.S. House of Representatives from Ohio's 1st district
- In office January 3, 1971 – January 3, 1974
- Preceded by: Robert Taft Jr.
- Succeeded by: Tom Luken

Personal details
- Born: William John Keating; March 30, 1927 Cincinnati, Ohio, US
- Died: May 20, 2020 (aged 93) Cincinnati, Ohio, US
- Party: Republican
- Education: University of Cincinnati

William John Keating (March 30, 1927 – May 20, 2020) was an American lawyer, businessman and Republican Party politician. He served in the United States House of Representatives from 1971 to 1974.

== Biography ==
Keating was born in Cincinnati, Ohio, the son of Adele (née Kipp) and Charles Humphrey Keating. He graduated from St Xavier High School and then served in the United States Navy during World War II. Keating received his bachelor's degree from the University of Cincinnati and his law degree from the University of Cincinnati College of Law.

=== Early career ===
He served as an assistant Ohio attorney general, and as a Cincinnati Municipal Court judge. Keating then served as a judge of the Hamilton County, Ohio Court of Common Pleas from 1964 to 1967. From 1967 to 1970, he served on the Cincinnati City Council.

=== Congress ===
Keating served in the United States House of Representatives from 1971 to 1974, representing Ohio's 1st congressional district. He resigned from Congress to become president and CEO of The Cincinnati Enquirer.

=== Later career and death ===
A founding member of the law firm Keating, Muething and Klekamp, Keating was awarded honorary degrees from the University of Cincinnati (LLD & DHL), Xavier University (LLD), and the College of Mount St Joseph (DHL).

Keating was CEO of the Detroit Newspaper Partnership, a joint operation of The Detroit News and the Detroit Free Press. He served as chairman of the board of the Associated Press and was president of the Newspaper Division of Gannett Company, Inc. Keating died on May 20, 2020.

He was heavily involved in the sport of swimming and is a member of the athletic halls of fame at St. Xavier High School, where he graduated in 1945, and the University of Cincinnati for his accomplishments, as are his brother Charles H. Keating Jr. (St. Xavier and UC), son Bill (St. Xavier and UC) and nephew Charles Keating III (St. Xavier and Indiana University).

Keating's great nephew is Chief petty officer Charles Keating IV, a Navy SEAL, who was killed at age 31 in combat with ISIS in Iraq in 2016. He was posthumously awarded the Navy Cross for his actions in combat.

== Sources ==
- United States Congress. "William J. Keating (id: K000037)". Biographical Directory of the United States Congress.

U.S. House of Representatives
Preceded by Robert Taft Jr.	Member of the U.S. House of Representatives from Ohio's 1st congressional district 1971–1974	Succeeded by Tom Luken
