= George Putnam (newsman) =

American journalist (1914–2008)

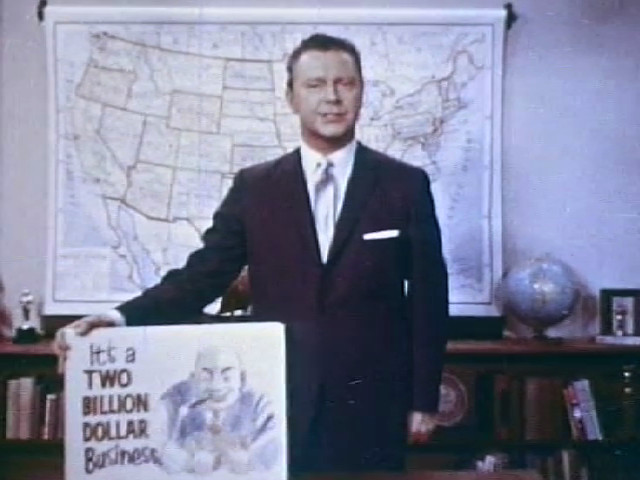
- Putnam in Perversion for Profit (1963)
- Born: July 14, 1914; Breckenridge, Minnesota, U.S.
- Died: September 12, 2008 (aged 94); Chino, California, U.S.
- Occupations: Television news reporter and talk show host
- Years active: 1934–2008
- Spouse: Ellen Virginia Putnam
- Children: 2
- Presenting career
- Show: George Putnam
- Stations: KCAA and Cable Radio Network (CRN)

George Putnam (July 14, 1914 – September 12, 2008) was an American television news reporter and talk show host based in Los Angeles. He was known for his catchy phrase "and that’s the up-to-the-minute news, up to the minute, that’s all the news" at the end of his broadcast. He concluded the 5:00 PM news with a teaser, inviting viewers back to get the full story at the station's late evening news program, smiling his signature close, "back at 10, see you then!"

== Life and career ==
Putnam was born in Breckenridge, Minnesota on July 14, 1914. His radio career began on his 20th birthday in 1934 at WDGY in Minneapolis, then continued in Washington, DC at WJSV and later, in New York City. While working in New York, influential newspaper columnist Walter Winchell declared that "George Putnam's voice is the greatest in radio."

From July 1949 to February 1951 tall, wavy-haired Putnam, known for his rich baritone voice, hosted the evening version of Broadway to Hollywood on the DuMont Television Network.

He began working in Los Angeles television in 1951, eventually hosting the highest-rated newscast. At one time or another, he anchored at all four of Los Angeles' major independent stations – KTTV (1951–1965 and 1968–1971), KTLA (1966–1968 and 1971–1973), KCOP (1974–1975) and KHJ-TV (now KCAL-TV, 1975–1976). In addition to his salary, he was provided a Rolls-Royce automobile while at KTTV and KTLA. He was replaced at KTLA by news legend Hal Fishman in 1975.

Putnam long carried a grudge against Fishman, stating on his radio show Talk Back that he was back-stabbed by him. Putnam made this claim for decades. It is noteworthy that when Fishman produced KTLA's 50th anniversary history in television in 1997, footage of Putnam was not used, though Putnam had been the face of KTLA news in the 1960s and 1970s before the arrival of Fishman. During KTLA's 60th-anniversary special during Thanksgiving weekend in 2007, the KTLA News intro from when George Putnam anchored the news was shown; Fishman died on August 7, 2007, three months before the 60th anniversary special aired.

In 1965, Putnam narrated a film titled Perversion for Profit, in which he warned viewers about magazines containing nudity and homosexual material, saying homosexuals were perverted and misfits, as well as implying they were child molesters. The film was financed by Charles Keating.

For his contribution to the television industry, George Putnam was awarded three Emmy awards as well as a star on the Hollywood Walk of Fame at 6372 Hollywood Blvd. The late Ted Knight stated that Putnam served in part as a model for the Ted Baxter character in the 1970s television series The Mary Tyler Moore Show on CBS.

He was also noted for his years of participation in the Rose Parade, having ridden in that event from 1951 until 2000, when his horse died. At the time, Putnam said that he was too advanced in age to train another Parade horse. Putnam lived and died at his 20-acre (81,000 m^{2}) working ranch in Chino. The ranch housed his sixty-five racehorses, which competed in the Kentucky Derby and all of the racetracks in Southern California. He also spent time at his home of fifty-seven years in Beverly Hills.

Putnam was the host of Talk Back, a conservative radio show he hosted daily after leaving the television anchor chair in 1975. It was based at KIEV in Glendale, California (now KRLA) until 2001 and moved to KCAA 1050 in San Bernardino in 2002. Talk Back was distributed nationwide on the Cable Radio Network on CRN1. Although Putnam advocated many conservative viewpoints, he stated many times his status as a "lifelong Democrat" since his youthful admiration of U.S. President Franklin D. Roosevelt. In addition to political talk Putnam interviewed many people whom he knew in show business including Bob Hope, Lucille Ball, Peggy Lee, Doris Day, Charlton Heston, John Wayne, Desi Arnaz, Milton Berle and many others. He and Lucille Ball were very close friends, as evidenced by her yearly in-person appearance on Talk Back on or around his birthday. Downtown Los Angeles workers were thrilled and surprised to see Ball making the walk through the underground level of Arco Plaza to Putnam's studio, often with her husband Gary Morton and no security detail. The studio was enclosed in glass so that people visiting Arco Plaza could observe shows and on occasion (as with Ball's appearances) ask questions of Putnam's guests. KIEV built the studio mainly for Putnam. He is credited with giving Blog reporter Matt Drudge his start.

He received an honorary LL.D. from Bates College in 1985.

Putnam had a cameo role as a TV news reporter or anchor in at least three films: Fourteen Hours (1951), I Want to Live! (1958) with Susan Hayward starring as accused murderer Barbara Graham, and the disaster film Independence Day (1996).

In a June 12, 2008, e-mail to Putnam's Newsmax readers, it was announced that Putnam was in a Los Angeles hospital undergoing medical treatment on his liver and kidneys. In mid-July he took part in a special on-air 94th "birthday" show, in which actress Doris Day appeared by telephone, according to the Los Angeles Times.

On September 12, 2008, Putnam died at Chino Valley Medical Center in Chino, California. He was 94.

== See also ==
- Perversion for Profit
