= Churchmen's Committee for Decent Publications =

American advocacy group

- Headquarters: United States

The Churchmen's Committee for Decent Publications was a Protestant advocacy group in the United States opposing pornography. It was a contemporary of the Roman Catholic National Organization for Decent Literature and the National Legion of Decency.
