= Charles Keating =

American businessman (1923–2014)

- Born: Charles Humphrey Keating Jr. December 4, 1923; Cincinnati, Ohio, U.S.
- Died: March 31, 2014 (aged 90); Phoenix, Arizona, U.S.
- Education: University of Cincinnati; University of Cincinnati College of Law
- Occupations: Lawyer; Financier; Real estate developer Banker; Activist
- Known for: Championship swimmer Anti-pornography activist Savings and loan scandal Keating Five
- Spouse: Mary Elaine Fette
- Children: 6

Charles Humphrey Keating Jr. (December 4, 1923 – March 31, 2014) was an American sportsman, lawyer, real estate developer, banker, financier, conservative activist, and convicted felon best known for his role in the savings and loan scandal of the late 1980s.

Keating was a champion swimmer for the University of Cincinnati in the 1940s. From the late 1950s through the 1970s, he was a noted anti-pornography activist, founding the organization Citizens for Decent Literature and serving as a member on the 1969 President's Commission on Obscenity and Pornography.

In the 1980s, Keating ran American Continental Corporation and the Lincoln Savings and Loan Association, and took advantage of loosened restrictions on banking investments. His enterprises began to suffer financial problems and were investigated by federal regulators. His financial contributions to, and requests for regulatory intervention from, five sitting U.S. senators led to those legislators being dubbed the "Keating Five".

When Lincoln failed in 1989 it cost the federal government over $3 billion and about 23,000 customers were left with worthless bonds. In the early 1990s, Keating was convicted in both federal and state courts of many counts of fraud, racketeering and conspiracy. He served four and a half years in prison before those convictions were overturned in 1996. In 1999, he pleaded guilty to a more limited set of wire fraud and bankruptcy fraud counts, and was sentenced to the time he had already served. Keating spent his final years in low-profile real estate activities until his death in 2014.

== Early life and military service ==
Keating was born on December 4, 1923, in Cincinnati, Ohio, into a devout Roman Catholic family. He was the son of Adele (née Kipp) and Charles Humphrey Keating. He grew up in the Avondale and Clifton neighborhoods of that city.

His younger brother William was born in 1927. Their father came from Kentucky and managed a dairy. Charles Keating Sr. lost a leg in a hunting accident, and then fell into a long decline from Parkinson's disease around 1931, and was nursed by his wife until his death in 1964.

Keating began swimming at a Catholic summer camp and became passionately involved in the sport. He attended St. Xavier High School, where he was a good student, was on the swimming team all four years, and also ran track and played football.

In swimming he led the team to three Greater Catholic League championships, set several school records, was named all-state, and was captain of the team in his senior year. Keating graduated from St Xavier in 1941.

After one semester at the University of Cincinnati in fall 1941, Keating left because of poor grades, although he advanced to the NCAA Men's Swimming and Diving Championships in 1942, finishing sixth in the 200 yard breaststroke. He enlisted in the United States Navy. He trained in the Navy Air Corps to become a carrier-based pilot flying Grumman F6F Hellcats.

During World War II, Keating was stationed in the U.S., sometimes at Banana Creek in Florida, and flew Hellcats to armed services swimming meets. He was not injured at Naval Air Station Vero Beach when he failed to lower the landing gear on his Hellcat wrecking his plane in a belly landing. Due to squadron transfers and receiving additional training on new intercept methods, the war ended without his being engaged in combat.

== Education and swimming ==
Keating was ready to return to college after finishing his Navy service in 1945. His abilities as a swimmer made him an attractive recruit, despite his having dropped out earlier. He made an agreement with the University of Cincinnati whereby it would accept for academic credit much of his Navy service, then he would take six months of liberal arts courses before entering its law school.

Keating won the 200-yard breaststroke at the Ohio Intercollegiate Conference championship in 1945. On March 30, 1946, Keating competed in the 200-yard breaststroke at the NCAA Men's Swimming and Diving Championships at Yale University's Payne Whitney Gymnasium. In an exciting, back-and-forth contest with Paul Murray of Cornell University and future coaching legend James Counsilman of Ohio State University, he prevailed by a foot to win the championship with a time of 2:26.2. (The event was later reclassified as the butterfly in NCAA records due to a definitional evolution involving the two strokes.)

This was the first ever national championship in any sport for the University of Cincinnati. He and teammate Roy Lagaly become the first-ever Bearcats to be named All-Americans. Keating was an imposing 6 feet 5 inches, a natural leader and co-captain of the team with Lagaly. Of Keating, Lagaly said, "You could tell even then he was going to be very successful. He was very ambitious. Whatever he did, he did all the way." Keating followed this by swimming for Cincinnati Gym, finishing second to future Olympic gold medalist Joseph Verdeur in the 220-yard breaststroke at the April 1946 national AAU championships.

Keating received his law degree from the University of Cincinnati College of Law in 1948, and would later be named a member of the university's Athletic Hall of Fame.

Charles Keating was a long-time supporter of U.S. swimming and beginning in 1969 he and his brother William donated $600,000 to St. Xavier High School in Cincinnati to build a state-of-the-art competition pool. The school's swimming team went on to win many state titles. St. Xavier named the Keating Natatorium after the brothers' father, and inducted Charles Keating into its initial Athletic Hall of Fame class in 1985. The University of Cincinnati's 2006 athletic building is named the Keating Aquatic Center, in honor of William Keating, and donations from the Keating family used to construct it. Charles Keating funded Cincinnati's Marlins swim club; six swimmers on the 1980 Summer Olympics squad were from its roster, including future Olympic champion Mary T. Meagher. When he later moved to Phoenix, Charles Keating built the Phoenix Swim Club, where Olympians also trained.

== Marriage and family ==
Keating married Mary Elaine Fette in 1949. She was an athletically-minded Catholic from an established Cincinnati family. They had six children, including Charles Keating III.

His daughter Mary married Gary Hall, who would go on to swim in the 1968, 1972 and 1976 Summer Olympics, winning a medal in each one. Keating's grandson Gary Hall Jr. competed in the 1996, 2000, and 2004 Summer Olympics as a swimmer and won ten medals overall.

Another Keating grandson, Chief petty officer Charles Keating IV, a Navy SEAL, was killed at age 31 in combat with ISIS in Iraq in 2016. He was posthumously awarded the Navy Cross for his actions in combat.

== Early legal and business career ==
After law school graduation, Keating did spot legal work for the FBI, then joined a law firm doing corporate law. On the side, he entered the business world where his ventures involved selling life insurance, running a fruit stand, and working for Roto-Rooter.

In 1952, along with his brother, William, and a mutual friend from law school, he became a founding partner of the Cincinnati law firm Keating, Muething & Klekamp. Beginning in the late 1950s they took on Carl Lindner Jr. as a client. Lindner was rapidly accumulating ice cream stores, supermarkets, real estate, and savings and loans, and soon essentially became Keating's sole client. In 1956, he filed requests for Q clearances on behalf of a small company of former Los Alamos Scientific Laboratory scientists with an office in Newtown, Ohio; unknown to Keating, the FBI suspected the application was fraudulent and launched an investigation of him, but no charges were made. Keating was admitted to the U.S. Supreme Court bar in 1958.

In 1960, Lindner and Keating created American Financial Corporation, a holding company of Lindner's disparate businesses that created further subsidiaries and financial instruments, all doing business with each other. Keating was named to the board of directors of the company in 1963.

== Anti-pornography activism ==
In 1956, Keating joined a priest leading a group of Catholics in Cincinnati who were concerned about the dangers of pornography, and he began giving talks on the subject to parents and other groups. In 1958, Keating testified before the House Judiciary Committee on mail-order pornography, saying that it was "capable of poisoning any mind at any age and of perverting our entire younger generation", and that it was closely tied to juvenile delinquency, while also quoting a Senate Committee report that "part of the Communist conspiracy was to print (obscene materials)". Keating mentioned links between pornography and Communism at other times, but distanced himself from the more fervent anti-Communist groups of the early 1960s. He stated that 90 percent of obscene materials were produced for profit, not ideological reasons, and told Congress in 1960, "I had better say [...] that I am not blaming obscenity in America on the Communists."

Keating founded Citizens for Decent Literature (CDL) in 1958 (later renamed a number of times, the best known of which is Citizens for Decency through Law), which advocated reading classics not "smut." It would grow to 300 chapters and 100,000 members nationwide and become the largest anti-pornography organization in the nation. It absorbed some other groups, such as National Citizens for Decent Literature and the Pittsburgh National Better Magazines Council. The structure of CDL was initially decentralized, but Keating grew frustrated with some local chapters taking aggressive actions he did not approve of, and so he gave it a more controlled focus with a national magazine, film production, and a greater role in legal actions.

Over the next two decades, CDL mailed some 40 million letters on behalf of its position and filed a series of amicus curiae briefs before the U.S. Supreme Court. Keating gained the nickname "Mr. Clean".

In 1964–65, Keating produced Perversion for Profit, a film featuring announcer George Putnam. It was a survey of then-available prurient and obscene materials, and asserted that pornography led to moral decay. It, along with two lesser-known films produced or distributed by CDL, was screened frequently throughout the country and remained in print for a long time.

In 1969, Keating's national reputation on the issue led President Richard Nixon to appoint him to the President's Commission on Obscenity and Pornography, which had been begun under Nixon's predecessor, Lyndon B. Johnson. The majority on the commission issued a report which concluded that pornography does not degrade the morals of adults or cause crime, and recommended that all federal, state, and local laws preventing consenting adults from obtaining pornographic materials be repealed. Keating, Nixon's only appointee on the 18-person commission, was the leading commission dissenter from the report.

In September 1970, Keating was granted a temporary restraining order from the D.C. Federal District Court to delay publication of the report, stating that he needed access to all the report's backing materials and time to write a dissent. Several days later, Keating was given the desired materials and two weeks to write his report by the committee.

Keating filed his dissent, saying, "At a time when the spread of pornography has reached epidemic proportions in our country and when the moral fiber of our nation seems to be rapidly unravelling, the desperate need is for enlightenment and intelligent control of the poisons which threaten us – not the declaration of moral bankruptcy inherent in the repeal of the laws which have been the defense of decent people against the pornographer for profit." Keating wrote, "One can consult all the experts he chooses, can write reports, make studies, etc., but the fact that obscenity corrupts lies within the common sense, the reason, and the logic of every man."

The Nixon administration tacitly supported Keating's legal efforts, and counsellor to the President John Ehrlichman assigned White House speechwriter Pat Buchanan to help draft the dissenting report. The commission's majority report was denounced by congressional leaders of both parties as well as by the administration.

The commission involvement earned Keating further national attention, which he used to push towards stringent behavior in Cincinnati. In 1969, Keating obtained an injunction preventing the showing in Cincinnati of softcore sexploitation master Russ Meyer's film Vixen!, claiming it was obscene, and the film was seized by the police the first day it opened. Showing of the film was successfully stopped in other parts of Ohio as well, and Meyer spent $250,000 in defense against Keating's legal actions. Keating said Meyer had done more to undermine morals in the nation than anyone else; Meyer responded that "I was glad to do it." The Cincinnati Vixen! case was appealed and in 1971 the Supreme Court of Ohio upheld the prohibition.

In 1970, Keating tried to block a closed-circuit showing of the musical Oh! Calcutta! in Cincinnati, saying that "it appeals to a prurient interest in sex." During 1972, a Keating legal action kept a sex film theater shut as a "public nuisance". He tried to prevent newsstands near his office from selling Playboy and Oui magazines. He denounced the Ramada Inn chain for offering adult programming on cable television to guests. Other local actions involving shutting stores and removing books from public libraries were attributed by civil liberties advocates to the "oppressive" trend that Keating had set. Such was Keating and his organization's effectiveness that when the U.S. Supreme Court handed down the 1973 Miller v. California decision establishing that obscenity definitions be based upon local community standards, every adult bookstore and movie house in Cincinnati was closed within hours.

Citizens for Decent Literature and Keating often warned about homosexuality as an example of what they saw as perverse behavior. The film Perversion for Profit had included a claim that homosexuals had a slogan saying that "today's conquest is tomorrow's competition"; in a 1977 speech in Miami, Keating repeated this phrase, concluding from it that homosexuality represented an endless "seduction of the innocent".

In 1975, Oui magazine gave Keating the top spot on its "Enemies of pornography" list. Hamilton County prosecutor Simon L. Leis Jr. put Ohio pornographer Larry Flynt on trial in 1976 for pandering obscenity and for engaging in a form of organized crime. Local public opinion ran against Flynt. Flynt was convicted on both counts and received the maximum sentence of 7 to 25 years in prison. While the conviction was later overturned on appeal, the verdict again established Cincinnati's community standards in this regard, and even after Keating left for Arizona, his influence remained in Cincinnati being a center of anti-pornography fervor. In the 1996 biopic, The People vs. Larry Flynt, which reportedly exaggerated Keating's role in the prosecution and trial, Keating was portrayed by actor James Cromwell. Attempts to show Vixen! in Cincinnati would continue, but by the late 1990s it was still illegal to do so. However, when in 1990, the Cincinnati Contemporary Arts Center and its director Dennis Barrie were prosecuted for obscenity for exhibiting Robert Mapplethorpe's traveling solo show The Perfect Moment, they were found not guilty by a jury.

== American Financial Corporation ==
While officially an outside lawyer, Keating functioned as a public face for Carl Lindner and American Financial Corporation and the two were close associates on business as well as legal matters; Lindner would sometimes refer to Keating as a "founder" of American Financial. The company had easy access to credit lines, which allowed it to continually grow. The web of transactions involving the company and its subsidiaries was large and complex, and one stock analyst stated in 1977 that he had "never come across a company that has so much strange paper on its books."

Keating left his law practice in 1972 and formally joined American Financial Corporation, by now a $1 billion enterprise, as executive vice president. Keating became Lindner's person in charge of firing employees from newly acquired companies. Within business circles Keating gained a reputation for aggressiveness and arrogance. He took on an operational involvement in The Cincinnati Enquirer, the town's only morning newspaper. He interfered in editorial decisions, such as adding coverage to high school sports that he or Lindner's sons were involved in. The paper was then sold to a group including his brother, William, who had been a Republican congressman from Ohio's 1st congressional district in the early 1970s. Charles Keating was involved in American Financial's 1974 sale of Bantam Books, and its decision that year not to enter the investment banking field.

In 1975 and 1976, several stockholder lawsuits were filed against American Financial, and Keating was under fire for aspects involving unsecured loans, stock warrants, and the sale of the Enquirer. The Securities and Exchange Commission (SEC) launched a major investigation of the company and charged Lindner, Keating and others with having defrauded investors and filing false SEC reports. At particular issue was a $14 million loan that the SEC said was made on preferential terms. Keating resigned from American Financial in August 1976, with conflicting stories as to whether or not Keating and Lindner had remained close or whether they had fallen out.

== American Continental Corporation ==
Keating moved to Phoenix, Arizona in 1976 to run the real estate firm American Continental Homes, a struggling, millions-losing homebuilding spin-off of American Financial that was given over to Keating for $300,000 as part of his departure package. The move was completed when his family followed him in 1978. In 1979 the SEC case with American Financial was settled, with Keating signing a consent agreement where he neither admitted nor denied guilt but agreed not to violate federal fraud and securities statutes. In practice, Keating was blamed for much of the irregular financial practices that had gone on and his reputation was significantly damaged.

Keating reaped benefits from the move to Arizona, a wide-open territory in both a physical and business sense that allowed someone a fresh start. He turned the now-renamed American Continental Corporation around, adding various operations and divisions in a structure somewhat reminiscent of American Financial. As chairman and controlling stockholder, Keating relied heavily upon family members, employing his son and four of his sons-in-law in prominent positions. Charles Keating III had a fast career rise within the company.

In 1979, Keating served as head of fundraising in the Southwest for John Connally's campaign for the 1980 Republican Party presidential nomination. Connally was a favorite of the business community, but his campaign had difficulty parlaying its fundraising successes into popular support. In early December 1979, Keating was named campaign manager, with the existing manager being demoted to campaign strategist. Keating's first action was as a "pruner" who immediately fired twenty workers at the campaign's Virginia headquarters. The campaign continued to struggle, and, by late February 1980, Keating was out as manager, with Connally taking the role. Connally's campaign ended two weeks later, famously known for having spent $11 million and gaining only one delegate.

Having won the 1980 election, President Reagan contacted Keating about becoming U.S. Ambassador to the Bahamas, where Keating had spent considerable time. When Keating's run-in with the SEC resurfaced in press reports, however, he was dropped from consideration. This dismayed Keating, who subsequently said, "To keep people like me out of positions like that because of yellow journalism, I don't know what good it does."

By the early 1980s, American Continental's profits were in the millions and it had become the biggest single-family home builder in Phoenix and Denver. At its peak it would have $6 billion in assets, a large number of subsidiaries, 2,500 employees, and a headquarters complex on Phoenix's Camelback Road. It had three corporate jets and a helicopter. He was a very hard worker and a strong presence to his employees; one later said, "It's almost magnetic. When he moves, things happen. The office would come alive when he walked in." He inspired both camaraderie and fervent loyalty in them. While he demanded long hours, he often rewarded employees monetarily and with gifts. Businesspeople outside his company often found Keating arrogant and difficult to deal with. Congressman William Keating, who was well-liked, said of his brother: "Charlie is impatient, aggressive, always on the move. He has clearly defined goals. I don't think he worries about the popularity of his positions." A Fortune profile in 1977 reported, "It seems almost impossible to find anyone who actually likes Charlie Keating." The story rankled Keating, who later had over five thousand large yellow "I Like Charlie Keating" buttons made up which he handed out to employees and visitors. Keating said, "There are a lot of people that would say nasty things, I'm sure, about me, but it ain't true that nobody ever liked Charlie Keating."

A devout Catholic, Keating became a heavy donor to charity when he moved to Phoenix, donating $100,000 to the Society of Saint Vincent de Paul, more than $1 million to Covenant House, and another more than $1 million to Mother Teresa's operations, including lending her his helicopter when she was in Arizona so that she could visit remote Indian reservations in the state. Covenant House's Father Bruce Ritter said of Keating, "He makes you believe in Providence." In 1983, Keating and his companies made legal but unusually large campaign donations in races for the Phoenix City Council, who were responsible for approving his building projects including water usage for residential developments built around artificial ponds. The scale of donations represented a change from past practice in local Phoenix politics; some council figures opposed the trend, while others readily asked for the funds.

== Lincoln Savings and the Keating Five ==
In 1984, American Continental Corporation bought Lincoln Savings and Loan Association for just over $50 million. Up through the early 1980s, Lincoln had been a conservatively-run enterprise, with almost half its assets in home loans and only a quarter of its assets considered at risk. It made slow growth at best, and had shown a loss for several years until it made a profit of a few million dollars in 1983. Once he took over, Keating fired the existing management. Savings and loan associations had been deregulated in the early 1980s, allowing them to make high-risk investments with their depositors' money, a change of which Keating and other savings and loan operators took advantage. When Keating later was asked why he got into savings and loans, he said, "I know the business inside out, and I always felt that an S & L, if they'd relax the rules, was the biggest moneymaker in the world."

Over the next four years Lincoln's assets increased from $1.1 billion to $5.5 billion. Lincoln's particular investments took the form of buying land, taking equity positions in real estate development projects, and buying high-yield junk bonds. A sales document from this period urges staff to, "always remember the weak, meek and ignorant are always good targets."

Beginning in 1985 the Federal Home Loan Bank Board (FHLBB) feared that the savings industry's risky investment practices were exposing the government's insurance funds to huge losses. It instituted a rule whereby savings associations could hold no more than 10 percent of their assets in "direct investments", and were thus prohibited from taking ownership positions in certain financial entities and instruments. Lincoln had become burdened with bad debt resulting from its past aggressiveness, and by early 1986 its investment practices were being investigated and audited by the San Francisco office of the FHLBB: in particular whether it had violated these direct investment rules; Lincoln had directed accounts insured by the Federal Deposit Insurance Corporation into commercial real estate ventures. By the end of 1986, that office of the FHLBB had found that Lincoln had $135 million in unreported losses and had surpassed the regulated direct investments limit by $600 million.

Keating believed that the regulators were against him because he opposed their rules. He also told his staff that some of the San Francisco regulators were likely "homos" who were "out to get him" for his strong moral views. Keating took measures to oppose the FHLBB, including recruiting a study from then-private economist Alan Greenspan saying that direct investments were not harmful, trying to hire FHLBB members or their wives, and getting President Ronald Reagan to make a recess appointment of a Keating ally, real estate developer Lee H. Henkel Jr., to the FHLBB. By March 1987, however, the ally had resigned upon news of his having large loans due to Lincoln. It appeared as though the government might seize Lincoln for being insolvent.

Starting in January 1987, Keating looked for help from what would become known as "the Keating Five": Democratic U.S. Senators Alan Cranston of California, Dennis DeConcini of Arizona, John Glenn of Ohio, and Donald W. Riegle of Michigan, and Republican U.S. Senator John McCain of Arizona. Keating had, or would soon make, legal political contributions of about $1.3 million to the senators, and he called on them to help him resist the regulators. Keating became a personal friend of McCain following their initial contacts in 1981, and McCain was the only one of the five with close social and personal ties to Keating. McCain and his family had made several trips at Keating's expense, sometimes aboard American Continental's jet, for vacations at Keating's opulent Bahamas retreat at Cat Cay.

Keating asked that Lincoln be given a lenient judgment by the FHLBB, so it could limit its high risk investments and get into the relatively safe home mortgage business, allowing the business to survive. A letter from audit firm Arthur Young & Co. bolstered Keating's case that the government investigation was taking a long time. McCain initially refused to meet with Keating over the FHLBB matter and Keating called McCain a "wimp" behind his back. The two had a heated, contentious meeting in which McCain said he had not spent years in North Vietnamese prisoner-of-war camps to have his courage or integrity questioned; the friendship ended and they would not speak again. In April 1987, the group of senators met twice with FHLBB members who were investigating American Continental Corporation and Lincoln, in an attempt to end the investigation. Meanwhile, Keating filed a lawsuit against the FHLBB, saying it had leaked confidential information about Lincoln. The outgoing head of the FHLBB in Washington deferred judgment and the new head was more sympathetic to Keating. In May 1988, the FHLBB agreed to an unprecedented memorandum of understanding giving Lincoln a clean slate and forgiveness for any violations up to that point. (In 1991, the senators would be rebuked to various degrees by the Senate Ethics Committee, with Cranston receiving the harshest verdict and Glenn and McCain the least. McCain later testified against Keating in a civil lawsuit brought by Lincoln bondholders, while the other four refused to testify.)

== Failure of Lincoln and American Continental ==
Lincoln stayed in business; from mid-1987 to April 1989, its assets grew from $3.91 billion to $5.46 billion. Following Keating's past practices with Lindner, American Continental amassed a large collection of confusingly connected subsidiaries in real estate, banking, and insurance businesses; these numbered at least 54, and there were some overseas ones that auditors were not aware of. Keating was triumphant in having defeated the regulators, whom he despised as useless relics from an outmoded financial past, and defended his high salary and business practices. He spent about $500,000 on radio advertisements in the Phoenix area to improve his public image; the commercials stressed his real estate projects and his family-oriented values. A 1988 Los Angeles Times profile assessed Keating as "a businessman without apparent peer in Arizona in terms of riches, clout and color." While Keating had taken Citizens for Decency through Law with him, he had generally de-emphasized his anti-pornography work when he moved to Arizona. Nevertheless, X-rated movies and Playboy magazine were banned from his hotels.

In October 1988, Keating opened his most extravagant real estate project ever, the 250-acre (1.0 km^{2}), 600-room The Phoenician Resort at the base of Camelback Mountain. Its construction cost $300 million, included many opulent, imported features, and saw a number of instances of Keating or his decorator wife making wholesale late design changes at great expense. His other grand project was Estrella, a 20,000-acre (81 km^{2}) mixed-use development outside of Phoenix in Goodyear, Arizona, in the direction of the Sierra Estrella. Incorporating homes, offices, industrial buildings, schools, shopping, a resort and a hospital, it was intended to eventually house 200,000 people and become a model 21st-century city. American Continental wrote rules saying that Estrella homeowners could not "intentionally terminat[e] a human pregnancy" or possess "adult material", but removed them once Keating was informed that such covenants were unconstitutional. A late 1980s downturn in the Sun Belt real estate market put Estrella in jeopardy before much building could be done.

Asked in an interview if he ever worried about going broke, Keating responded, "All the time, every day. I come into the office with this hollow feeling in my stomach lots of time.... You get trapped almost. You get too many responsibilities. It's a bellyfull to carry. It's risky. Dangerous. There's the possibility of failure with it every day and every night. But in a way, it's a challenge. It's invigorating. There isn't any point in not being a player – you're here.... It's not only the money. It's the disgrace, yourself, your manhood. I'm not sure I'd have a big problem with that. On the other hand I'm not sure I wouldn't."

As Lincoln grew, money was siphoned from Lincoln to the parent American Continental Corporation under a variety of schemes, and American Continental spent lavishly on speculative investments and personal expenses. A new regulatory investigation began in July 1988. After Arthur Young & Co indicated doubts about some accounting practices, Keating fired them in September 1988 and switched to Touche Ross. American Continental was desperate for cash inflow to make up for losses in real estate purchases and projects. Lincoln's branch managers and tellers convinced customers to replace their federally insured certificates of deposit with higher-yielding bond certificates of American Continental; the customers later said they were never properly informed that the bonds were uninsured and very risky given the state of American Continental's finances. The regulators had already adjudged the bonds to have no solvent backing. Federal Deposit Insurance Corporation chair L. William Seidman would later write that Lincoln's push to get depositors to switch was "one of the most heartless and cruel frauds in modern memory". In late 1988, Keating began desperate attempts to sell Lincoln; regulators rejected one $50 million potential sale due to the buyers not meeting federal requirements.

A December 1988 audit by the FHLBB found Lincoln in violation of many regulations and in danger of default. The following month they ordered Keating to stop transferring cash from Lincoln to American Continental, which imperiled the latter's survival strategy and caused its stock price to nosedive. Keating tried to arrange junk bond deals with Michael Milken and place bets in the global currency markets to generate cash, but the moves failed and he lost $11 million in one month alone. Keating got Senators DeConcini and Cranston to pressure the regulators to let a sale go through, but this time the lawmakers were ignored.

American Continental went bankrupt in April 1989, and Lincoln was seized by the FHLBB. About 23,000 customers were left with worthless bonds. Many investors, often ones living in California retirement communities, lost their life savings, and later claimed to have suffered emotional trauma for having been duped on top of their financial devastation. The total bondholder loss came to between $250 million and $288 million.

The federal government was eventually liable for $3.4 billion to cover Lincoln's losses when it seized the institution. In talking to reporters in April 1989, Keating maintained that he was the victim of a federal government that had spent years trying to destroy him, and then said, "One question, among many raised in recent weeks, had to do with whether my financial support in any way influenced several political figures to take up my cause. I want to say in the most forceful way I can: I certainly hope so."

In September 1989, Keating was hit with a $1.1 billion fraud and racketeering action, filed against him by the regulators. He proclaimed that, "We've lost everything in this thing, my wife and I. It's devastating." In November 1989, Keating was subpoenaed to testify before the House Banking Committee, but refused to answer questions, invoking his right against self-incrimination under the Fifth Amendment. Also in November, his Phoenician Resort was seized by the FBI; under their operation it became known as "Club Fed" before later being sold to a Kuwaiti group. The vastly ambitious Estrella project would remain deserted and was sold in 1993 to an investment group.

By November 1989, the estimated cost of the overall savings and loan crisis had reached $500 billion, and the media's coverage often highlighted Keating's role as part of what became a feeding frenzy. Keating and Lincoln Savings became convenient symbols for arguments about what had gone wrong in America's financial system and society, as well as for 1980s greed in general, and were featured in popular culture references. A deck of playing cards would be marketed, called "The Savings and Loan Scandal", that featured on their face Charles Keating holding up his hand, with images of the Keating Five senators portrayed as puppets on his fingers.

== Legal consequences ==
Keating blamed government regulators for the failure of Lincoln Savings and sued for control over the bank. The suit was dismissed in August 1990, with the judge calling the seizure fully justified. Keating's legal fees were running at $1 million per month.

In September 1990, Keating and his associates were indicted by the State of California on 42 counts related to having duped Lincoln's customers into buying worthless junk bonds of American Continental Corporation. Keating went to jail when he could not post a $5 million bond. He was convicted in December 1991 of 17 counts of fraud, racketeering, and conspiracy. Mother Teresa asked the court to show leniency to Keating, in recognition of the considerable sums he had donated to her charitable operations. In April 1992, California Superior Court Judge Lance Ito gave Keating the maximum 10-year prison sentence, quoting Woody Guthrie, to wit "More people have suffered from the point of a fountain pen than from a gun." Keating was sent to the medium-security Federal Correctional Institution, Tucson to serve his time.

In May 1992, Keating's son-in-law, Robert M. Wurzelbacher Jr., a senior vice president of American Continental, and chief executive of an investment firm owned by Lincoln Savings, who was also implicated, pleaded guilty to three federal fraud counts in connection with the collapse of the Lincoln Savings and Loan Association and agreed to testify against Keating. (In December 1993, Wurzelbacher was sentenced to a 40-month prison term.)

In January 1993, a federal conviction followed, on 73 counts of fraud, racketeering and conspiracy. In July 1993, Keating was given a 12 1/2 year sentence. The judge ordered Keating to pay restitution of $122 million to the government, but Keating said he was $10 million in debt and had no assets to sell.

One case filed by the U.S. Securities and Exchange Commission was settled in 1994: Keating said he was bankrupt but agreed to repay millions should any hidden assets be discovered. A third case filed by the Resolution Trust Corporation resulted in a summary judgment of $4.3 billion against Keating and his wife in 1994, the largest judgment ever against a private person. The judgment was overturned on appeal in 1999, on grounds that Keating could not be held personally liable to the government without a specific criminal conviction or some other decision at trial. Throughout his incarceration, Keating maintained his innocence, saying he was a "political prisoner" of the U.S. government and a scapegoat for the largest banking scandal in the nation's history.

In April 1996, the 9th U.S. Circuit Court of Appeals in San Francisco ruled that state trial judge Ito had given the jury faulty instructions about the law regarding fraud. The conviction was overturned. In December 1996, the same Court of Appeals ruled that some of the jurors in the federal case might have been influenced by their knowledge and discussion of the results of the state case, and threw out the federal conviction. Keating was freed after 4 1/2 years in prison; he later said that staying tough during his incarceration was the thing he was proudest of. He was said to have gotten along well with other prisoners and served as best man at weddings for some that he met there.

In April 1999, on the eve of the retrial of the federal case, Keating entered a plea agreement. He admitted to having committed four counts of wire and bankruptcy fraud by extracting nearly $1 million from American Continental Corp while already anticipating the collapse that happened weeks later. The federal prosecutors dropped all other charges against him and his son, Charles Keating III. He was sentenced to time served.

In October 2000, the U.S. Supreme Court refused to hear the government's appeal of the overturning of the state conviction. This left Keating without any convictions other than that from his plea bargain. State prosecutors declined to move for a retrial, saying it would bring no more than a six-month jail sentence and that many witnesses had died in the interim or were in bad health. Keating replied that if the government had left him alone, investors "would all be rich."

== Final years and death ==
Following his release from prison, Keating separated from his wife Mary. He moved in with his daughter Mary and son-in-law Gary Hall Sr. in the Phoenix suburb of Paradise Valley.

During the 2000s, Keating worked as a business consultant and as of 2008 was involved in some successful real estate developments in the Phoenix market. He kept a low profile in his business operations, and declined comment during John McCain's 2008 presidential campaign when the Keating Five scandal was brought up again by the press. During his final years, Keating maintained good physical shape through swimming and walking and was able to go out in public without being recognized.

Charles Keating died in a Phoenix hospital on March 31, 2014, at age 90, after an undisclosed illness of several weeks.

== Legacy ==
The Chicago Tribune's lengthy profile of Keating in 1990 said in summary:

To say that Charles Keating is a complex man seems a gross understatement. Some see him as an aggressive man who got desperate when the real estate market bottomed out and crossed the line between "business as usual" and fraud. Others see him as a con artist who finally got caught, a hypocrite who masked his greed with phony piety.

Michael Binstein and Charles Bowden's 1993 book, Trust Me: Charles Keating and the Missing Billions, also presents Keating as a complex individual with contradictory tendencies, and concludes:

Charlie Keating built things, and, at some level that haunts anyone who looks over his records, he thought his schemes would work. He did not simply rob a bank. He broke a bank with his dreams. If he is simply a thief, why did he put the money into deals and projects instead of into his own pocket? If he is just a hardworking businessman simply trying to make a profit and create jobs, why the need for jets, fancy meals, big paychecks to his family? If he is such a devout communicant of his faith, why did he peddle hundreds of millions of dollars' worth of junk bonds to old people when he knew his empire was in serious jeopardy?

Keating steadfastly maintained that it was not his mistakes or criminal deeds but regulators' actions that were responsible for the major losses.

Some of Keating's 1980s judgment as a developer was later vindicated. The Phoenician became a successful hotel in the luxury segment, and the Estrella project achieved at least some of Keating's vision and was acquired again in 2005.

== In popular culture ==
In the novel Myron, author Gore Vidal uses the names of various anti-pornography crusaders to take the place of swear words. One of the names is "keating", which is used many times throughout the book as a synonym for "shit".

Keating, portrayed by James Cromwell, appeared in Miloš Forman's 1996 film The People vs. Larry Flynt, leading a Citizens for Decent Literature charge against Flynt's Hustler Magazine.

== Bibliography ==
- Alexander, Paul (2002). Man of the People: The Life of John McCain. Hoboken, New Jersey: John Wiley & Sons. ISBN 0-471-22829-X.
- Binstein, Michael; Bowden, Charles (1993). Trust Me: Charles Keating and the Missing Billions. New York: Random House. ISBN 0-679-41699-4.
- Day, Kathleen (1993). S & L Hell: The People and the Politics Behind the $1 Trillion Savings and Loan Scandal. New York: W. W. Norton & Company. ISBN 0-393-02982-4.
- Strub, Whitney (2010). Perversion for Profit: The Politics of Pornography and the Rise of the New Right. New York: Columbia University Press. ISBN 978-0-231-14887-0.
