= Charles Keating (businessman) =

Canadian businessman

Charles V. Keating, CM (September 17, 1933 – November 22, 2005) was a Canadian businessman who was a director of Shaw Communications.

In 2002, he was made a Member of the Order of Canada. The Charles V. Keating Millennium Centre, a multi-purpose arena and conference centre at St. Francis Xavier University, and the Charles V Keating Emergency and Trauma Centre are named after him.
