= American Continental Corporation =

Real estate company in Arizona

American Continental Corporation was a Phoenix, Arizona-based real estate company of the 1970s and 1980s.

== History ==
The company was created in 1978 as a spin-off of American Financial Group, meant to do residential home construction. Its chairman was Charles Keating, who moved to Phoenix to run it.

By 1981, Keating had two thousand employees on his payroll and was one of the largest land developers in Arizona, benefiting from a home building boom in the state.

In February 1984, American Continental Corporation acquired the underperforming Lincoln Savings and Loan Association for $51 million. Much of American Continental's assets were in the form of Arizona real estate, junk bonds, and mortgage-backed securities. Lincoln Savings expanded into aggressive, risky land development deals and financial arrangements, including loans due to American Continental. For most of 1987, American Continental was profitable, but by 1988, losses mounted, due to financial troubles and other bad happenings at Lincoln Savings. By 1989, Lincoln made up 90 percent of American Continental's assets.

On April 13, 1989, American Continental Corporation filed for Chapter 11 bankruptcy. It was liquidated by the court in December 1990. The loss of investors' life savings in Lincoln became one of the key events of the 1980s Savings and loan crisis and the core of the Keating Five political scandal.

== Archival interest ==
An 1,800+ linear feet collection of archival records from the American Continental Corporation is available at the Arizona State University Department of Archives and Special Collections and consists of correspondence files, architectural and land use plans, promotional and advertising materials, environmental impact reports, regulatory reports, trial records, attorneys records and financial records relating to the corporation and a number of its subsidiaries. The records extend from approximately 1971 to 1993. Access to certain parts of this collection are limited by court order.
