= Lincoln Savings and Loan Association =

Failed financial institution

- Type: Subsidiary
- Industry: Savings and loan
- Founded: 1925; 101 years ago in Los Angeles
- Defunct: April 14, 1989; 37 years ago
- Fate: Insolvency
- Successor: Great Western Bank
- Headquarters: Irvine, California
- Key people: Charles Keating
- Parent: American Continental Corporation

The Lincoln Savings and Loan Association of Irvine, California, was the financial institution at the heart of the Keating Five scandal during the 1980s savings and loan crisis.

== History ==
Lincoln Savings and Loan Association was founded in Los Angeles as a California chartered savings & loan in 1925.

Through the early 1980s, Lincoln was a conservatively-run enterprise, with almost half its assets in home loans and only a quarter of its assets considered at risk. It had slow growth at best, and had shown a loss for several years until it made a profit of a few million dollars in 1983.

Lincoln then became headed by Charles Keating, who as chairman of a housing construction company, American Continental Corporation, purchased Lincoln in February 1984 for $51 million. Keating fired the existing management. Over the next four years, Lincoln's assets increased from $1.1 billion to $5.5 billion. Such savings and loan associations had been deregulated in the early 1980s, allowing them to make highly risky investments with their depositors' money, a change of which Keating took advantage.

Alan Greenspan sent a letter in February 1985 to officials of the Federal Home Loan Bank of San Francisco supporting an application for an exemption for Lincoln to a bank board rule forbidding substantial amounts of some investments, yet the exemption was not granted to Lincoln.

When American Continental Corporation, the parent of Lincoln Savings, went bankrupt in 1989, more than 21,000 mostly elderly investors lost their life savings. Lincoln Savings was seized by federal authorities the day following American Continental's bankruptcy filing. This total came to about $285 million, largely because such investors held securities backed by the parent company rather than deposits in the federally insured institution, a distinction apparently lost on many if not most of them until it was too late. The federal government covered almost $3 billion of Lincoln's losses when it seized the institution. Many creditors were made whole, and the government then attempted to liquidate the seized assets through its Resolution Trust Corporation, often at pennies on the dollar compared to what the property had allegedly been worth and the valuation at which loans against it had been made. Charles Keating would be sent to prison for fraud.

At the time of the Federal seizure on April 14, 1989, Lincoln Savings was the 42nd largest savings & loan in the country with 29 branches throughout Southern California and assets of $5.4 billion and deposits of $4.4 billion but only $20 million in required capital on hand instead of the required $325 million in capital. It took two years for the RTC to liquidate Lincoln Savings. In March 1991, Beverly Hills-based Great Western Bank paid the RTC $12.1 million for 28 offices and $1 billion in deposits.

== See also ==
- List of largest U.S. bank failures
